= Preston A. Whitmore II =

American screenwriter

Preston Whitmore
- Born: Preston A. Whitmore, II; June 26, 1962 (age 64); Detroit, Michigan, United States
- Occupations: Writer, producer, director
- Notable work: This Christmas (2007); Doing Hard Time (2004); Fled (1996)

Preston Alexander Whitmore II (born June 26, 1962) is an American film director, film producer, and screenwriter. He is best known for his 2007 comedy-drama This Christmas, garnered an NAACP Image Award nomination for Outstanding Directing in 2008.

== Early life ==
Whitmore was born in 1962 in Detroit, the third and youngest child of Shirley and Preston Alexander Whitmore Sr. After dropping out of high school, he enlisted in the Marine Corps where he acquired his GED and began taking college courses focusing on law enforcement and criminal procedure. After his service in the Marines, he settled in California and went to Los Angeles City College, where he received his associate degree. He subsequently transferred to California State University, Northridge where he received his Bachelor of Arts degree in political science. After graduating from CSUN, Whitmore attended the University of La Verne College of Law, where he won the American Jurisprudence Award for Legal Analysis and Writing.

== Film ==
Whitmore entered the entertainment industry first as a rapper and lyricist for Brian and Eddie Holland of Motown fame. He turned his attention to screenwriting when Motown lyricist and recording artist, Angelo Bond, told him his stories were too big for a three-minute song. Following Bond's advice, Whitmore made two short films, This End of The Couch, starring Lewis Dix, Charles Holman and comedian Reynaldo Rey and No Reply starring Giancarlo Esposito and Darryl Sivad. Whitmore sold a number of high-profile spec scripts and was named by Fade-In Magazine one of Hollywood's "Hottest Young Writers".

Whitmore made his film-making debut by writing and directing The Walking Dead (1995), chronicling the lives and mission of four African-American soldiers in Vietnam, which drew on his experiences in the Marine Corps. It starred Allen Payne, Eddie Griffin, Joe Morton, Vonte Sweet, and Bernie Mac. Thereafter he wrote and executive-produced Fled (1996), an action picture starring Laurence Fishburne and Stephen Baldwin as two prisoners on the lam to find a hidden cache of cash and incriminating computer evidence that would bring down the Cuban Mafia.

His work has often focused on the disproportionate incarceration of African Americans. This is addressed in three films he wrote and produced. The first Lockdown (2000), starring Richard T. Jones, Gabriel Casseus and De'Aundre Bonds as a group of friends unjustly imprisoned, tracks the gritty dissolution of their innocence and friendship behind bars. The film, released under Rainforest Columbia Tri-star collaboration, was one of Columbia Tri-Star's top selling independent releases. Second, Civil Brand (2002) focuses on slave-labor programs in women's prisons. This independent, low-budget production starring LisaRaye, N'Bushe Wright, Monica Calhoun, Mos Def, Clifton Powell and Da Brat, won the Blockbuster Award for Best film, Best Actor; Clifton Powell, 2002 American Black Film Festival; Audience Award for Best Film, Special Jury Prize, and 2002 Urbanworld Film Festival and featured at the 2003 Sundance Film Festival.

In 2004, after completing a rewrite of the Get Shorty sequel entitled Be Cool, Whitmore wrote, produced and directed the Screen Gems film, Doing Hard Time (2004), starring Boris Kodjoe, Michael K. Williams, Giancarlo Esposito and Sticky Fingaz. Moving away from the gritty subject matter of prison films, Whitmore wrote and directed the basketball drama, Crossover (2006), a film shot in his hometown of Detroit about street basketball, starring Anthony Mackie, Wesley Jonathan, and Wayne Brady.

Whitmore wrote, produced, and directed This Christmas (2007), starring Loretta Devine, Idris Elba, Lauren London, Regina King, and Chris Brown. This Christmastime drama centers around the Whitfield family's first holiday together in four years and was inspired by individuals in Whitmore's actual family, the three Whitfield sons representing Whitmore in different phases of his life. The film won The Asian Excellence Award for Outstanding Actress in a Movie; Sharon Leal, nominated for an NAACP Image Award for Outstanding Supporting Actress in a Motion Picture; Loretta Devine, an NAACP Image Award for Outstanding Directing in a Motion Picture; Preston A. Whitmore, II, and an MTV Movie Award for Breakthrough Performance; Chris Brown.

Next, Whitmore completed a trio of book adaptations, the independent feature film True to the Game directed by him, starring Columbus Short, Nelsan Ellis, Jennifer Freeman, Nafessa Williams, Andra Fuller, Draya Michele and Vivica Fox, based on the popular Teri Woods novel of the same name. It was released theatrically the summer of 2017 and debuted on Netflix in 2018. Whitmore penned the screenplay for the second installment of the popular Teri Woods novel of the same name True to the Game 2, directed by Jamal Hill. It was released theatrically November 6, 2020. He wrote and directed, Dutch (2021) starring Lance Gross, Natasha Marc, Macy Gray, James Hyde, and Melissa Williams, which was also based on a novel by Woods.

Whitmore subsequently wrote and directed, "The Fight That Never Ends" (2021), about a Jewish woman and a gang leader who fall in love while fighting racial injustice against the backdrop of the Los Angeles 1992 Riots— starring Allen Payne, Christa B. Allen and Robert Ri'chard. Whitmore's "Real Talk" (2021), which he wrote, directed, and produced was acquired by Imani Media Group. The film follows the humorous, sarcastic and sometimes harsh, talk radio host, Dominique the Dame, as she brings to the forefront America's contemporary views on race, sex, drugs, religion and technology. The radio program takes on a greater meaning when Dame mobilizes her listeners in a race against time to save the life of a pregnant teenager. It stars Jasmine Carmichael, Michael Beach, London Brown, Macy Gray, Roger Guenveur Smith, Casper Van Dien, Robert Ri'chard and Loretta Devine. Whitmore penned the original screenplay Hello (2022), about an emotionally unavailable flight attendant who meets a potential love interest and later finds out that her perfect guy has ulterior motives— starring Eva Marcille and Charlie Weber.

Whitmore develops television and feature film projects at his Los Angeles-based production company, The Preston Picture Company.

== Television and Theater ==
Whitmore has also worked in television and theater, writing episodes for the half-hour situation comedy, Malcolm & Eddie, starring Malcolm Jamal Warner and Eddie Griffin. Whitmore wrote and directed two plays: Five A.M. starring Yvonna Kopacz-Wright portraying five characters and Preston Whitmore's PIMP starring Paul Farmer about an unapologetic hustler named Slim Jenkins. Both plays debuted at the Tiffany Theater on Sunset Boulevard in Los Angeles. In addition, Whitmore also wrote and produced the television motion picture crime thriller, Blood Crime (2002), starring James Caan and Johnathon Schaech.

== Radio ==
Whitmore produces a weekly syndicated radio program, "Encouraging You To Go Higher", with Pastor Ron Taylor, for his church, Arise Christian Center.

== Filmography ==
Year	Title	Director	Writer	Producer
1995	The Walking Dead	Yes	Yes	No
1996	Fled	No	Yes	Executive
2000	Lockdown	No	Yes	No
2002	Civil Brand	No	Yes	Yes
2002	Blood Crime (TV)	No	Yes	Yes
2004	Doing Hard Time	Yes	Yes	Yes
2007	This Christmas	Yes	Yes	Yes
2006	Crossover	Yes	Yes	No
2009	Dough Boys	No	Yes	Yes
2017	True to the Game	Yes	No	No
2020	True to the Game 2	No	Yes	No
2021	Dutch	Yes	Yes	No
2021	Real Talk	Yes	Yes	Yes
2021	The Fight That Never Ends	Yes	Yes	No
2022	Hello	No	Yes	No
