= Black Reel Award for Outstanding Supporting Actor =

Award presented annually by the Black Reel Awards

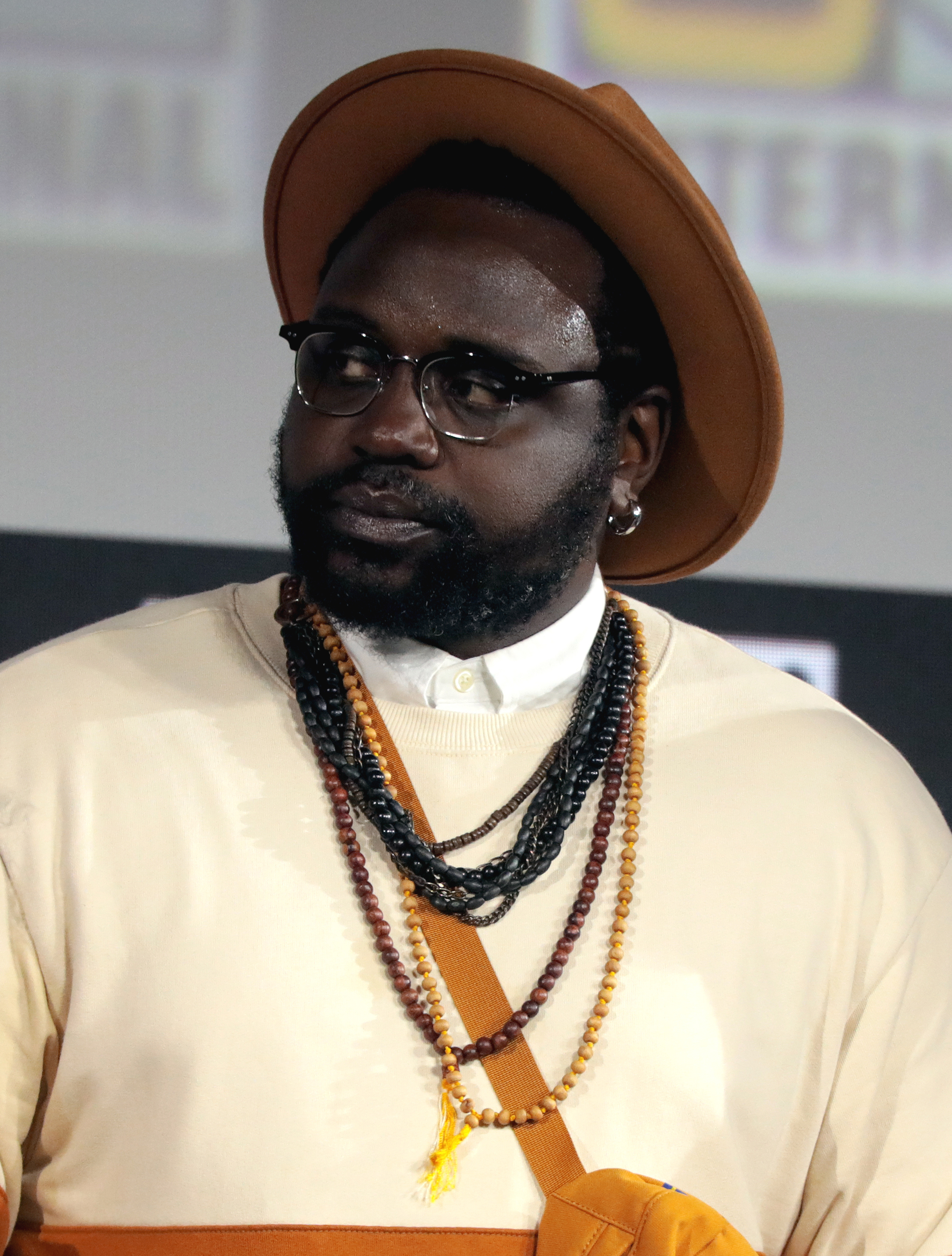
- The 2023 recipient: Brian Tyree Henry
- Awarded for: Outstanding Supporting Actor
- Country: United States
- Presented by: Black Reel Awards (BRAs)
- First award: 2000
- Final award: 2023
- Final winner: Brian Tyree Henry; Causeway

Highlights
- Most awards: Don Cheadle, Jamie Foxx, Djimon Hounsou & Wesley Snipes (2)
- Most nominations: Chiwetel Ejiofor, Jamie Foxx & Jeffrey Wright (5)
- Website: blackreelawards.com

This article lists the winners and nominees for the Black Reel Award for Outstanding Supporting Actor in a Motion Picture. Oscar-nominated or winning performances also honored with nominations or wins at the Black Reel Awards include Barkhad Abdi (Captain Phillips), Morgan Freeman (Million Dollar Baby), Michael Clarke Duncan (The Green Mile), Jamie Foxx (Collateral), Djimon Hounsou (Blood Diamond, In America) and Eddie Murphy (Dreamgirls).

The award was discontinued at the 24th Black Reel Awards and merged with Outstanding Supporting Actress in favor of a single gender-neutral award, Outstanding Supporting Performance.

== Winners and nominees ==
Winners are listed first and highlighted in bold.

=== 2000s ===
Year	Actor	Film	Ref
2000
2000	**Michael Clarke Duncan**	**The Green Mile**	
2000	Jamie Foxx	Any Given Sunday	
2000	Terrence Howard	The Best Man	
2000	Ice Cube	Three Kings	
2000	Delroy Lindo	The Cider House Rules	
2001
2001	**Don Cheadle**	**Traffic**	
2001	Rob Brown	Finding Forrester	
2001	Tommy Davidson	Bamboozled	
2001	Chris Rock	Nurse Betty	
2001	Marlon Wayans	Requiem of a Dream	
2002
2002	**Jamie Foxx**	**Ali**	
2002	Anthony Anderson	Two Can Play That Game	
2002	Omar Epps	Brother	
2002	Eddie Murphy	Shrek	
2002	Ving Rhames	Baby Boy	
2003
2003	**Dennis Haysbert**	**Far from Heaven**	
2003	Cedric the Entertainer	Barbershop	
2003	Morgan Freeman	Sum of All Fears	
2003	Denzel Washington	Antwone Fisher	
2003	Forest Whitaker	Panic Room	
2004
2004	**Djimon Hounsou**	**In America**	
2004	Mos Def	The Italian Job	
2004	Morgan Freeman	Bruce Almighty	
2004	Ving Rhames	Dark Blue	
2004	Forest Whitaker	Phone Booth	
2005
2005	**Jamie Foxx**	**Collateral**	
2005	Cedric the Entertainer	Barbershop 2: Back in Business	
2005	Morgan Freeman	Million Dollar Baby	
2005	Clifton Powell	Ray	
2005	Jeffrey Wright	The Manchurian Candidate	
2006
2006	**Terrence Howard**	**Crash**	
2006	Anthony Anderson	Hustle & Flow	
2006	Chiwetel Ejiofor	Serenity	
2006	Ludacris	Crash	
2006	Jeffrey Wright	Syriana	
2007
2007	**Djimon Hounsou**	**Blood Diamond**	
2007	Chiwetel Ejiofor	Children of Men	
2007	Chiwetel Ejiofor	Kinky Boots	
2007	Laurence Fishburne	Akeelah and the Bee	
2007	Eddie Murphy	Dreamgirls	
2008
2008	**Jeffrey Wright**	**Cadillac Records**	
2008	Mos Def	Cadillac Records	
2008	Terrence Howard	Iron Man	
2008	Brandon T. Jackson	Tropic Thunder	
2008	Eamonn Walker	Cadillac Records	

=== 2010s ===
Year	Actor	Film	Ref
2010
2010	**Anthony Mackie**	**The Hurt Locker**	
2010	Charles S. Dutton	American Violet	
2010	Chiwetel Ejiofor	2012	
2010	Lenny Kravitz	Precious	
2010	Derek Luke	Madea Goes to Jail	
2011
2011	**Wesley Snipes**	**Brooklyn's Finest**	
2011	Sean Combs	Get Him to the Greek	
2011	Laurence Fishburne	Predator	
2011	Brandon T. Jackson	Percy Jackson & the Olympians: The Lightning Thief	
2011	Samuel L. Jackson	Mother and Child	
2012
2012	**Don Cheadle**	**The Guard**	
2012	Mike Epps	Jumping the Broom	
2012	Laurence Fishburne	Contagion	
2012	Anthony Mackie	The Adjustment Bureau	
2012	Isiah Whitlock Jr.	Cedar Rapids	
2013
2013	**Samuel L. Jackson**	**Django Unchained**	
2013	Mike Epps	Sparkle	
2013	Dwight Henry	Beasts of the Southern Wild	
2013	David Oyelowo	Middle of Nowhere	
2013	Nate Parker	Arbitrage	
2014
2014	**Barkhad Abdi**	**Captain Phillips**	
2014	David Oyelowo	The Butler	
2014	Nate Parker	Ain't Them Bodies Saints	
2014	Tequan Richmond	Blue Caprice	
2014	Keith Stanfield	Short Term 12	
2015
2015	**Wendell Pierce**	**Selma**	
2015	Nelsan Ellis	Get On Up	
2015	David Oyelowo	A Most Violent Year	
2015	Tyler Perry	Gone Girl	
2015	Michael K. Williams	The Gambler	
2016
2016	**Idris Elba**	**Beasts of No Nation**	
2016	Chiwetel Ejiofor	The Martian	
2016	Corey Hawkins	Straight Outta Compton	
2016	Jason Mitchell	Straight Outta Compton	
2016	Forest Whitaker	Southpaw	
2017
2017	**Mahershala Ali**	**Moonlight**	
2017	Jovan Adepo	Fences	
2017	Stephen Henderson	Fences	
2017	André Holland	Moonlight	
2017	Ashton Sanders	Moonlight	
2018
2018	**Jason Mitchell**	**Mudbound**	
2018	Idris Elba	Molly's Game	
2018	Jamie Foxx	Baby Driver	
2018	Laurence Fishburne	Last Flag Flying	
2018	Lil Rel Howery	Get Out	
2019
2019	**Michael B. Jordan**	**Black Panther**	
2019	Daniel Kaluuya	Widows	
2019	Mahershala Ali	Green Book	
2019	Russell Hornsby	The Hate U Give	
2019	Brian Tyree Henry	If Beale Street Could Talk	

== 2020s ==
Year	Actor	Film	Ref
2020
2020	Wesley Snipes	Dolemite Is My Name	
2020	Jonathan Majors	The Last Black Man in San Francisco	
2020	Aldis Hodge	Clemency	
2020	Sterling K. Brown	Waves	
2020	Jamie Foxx	Just Mercy	
2021
2021	Daniel Kaluuya	Judas and the Black Messiah	
2021	Chadwick Boseman (posthumous)	Da 5 Bloods	
2021	Colman Domingo	Ma Rainey's Black Bottom	
2021	Aldis Hodge	One Night in Miami...	
2021	Leslie Odom Jr.	One Night in Miami...	
2022
2022	Colman Domingo	Zola	
2022	Idris Elba	The Harder They Fall	
2022	Andre Holland	Passing	
2022	LaKeith Stanfield	The Harder They Fall	
2022	Jeffrey Wright	The French Dispatch	
2022
2022	Brian Tyree Henry	Causeway	
2022	Micheal Ward	Empire of Light	
2022	Michael K. Williams (posthumous)	Breaking	
2022	Bokeem Woodbine	The Inspection	
2022	Jeffrey Wright	The Batman	

== Multiple nominations and wins ==
=== Multiple wins ===
2 Wins

- Don Cheadle
- Jamie Foxx
- Djimon Hounsou
- Wesley Snipes

=== Multiple nominations ===
5 nominations

- Chiwetel Ejiofor
- Jamie Foxx
- Jeffrey Wright

4 nominations

- Laurence Fishburne

3 nominations

- Idris Elba
- Morgan Freeman
- Terrence Howard
- David Oyelowo
- Forest Whitaker

2 nominations

- Mahershala Ali
- Anthony Anderson
- Cedric the Entertainer
- Don Cheadle
- Mos Def
- Colman Domingo
- Mike Epps
- Brian Tyree Henry
- Aldis Hodge
- Andre Holland
- Djimon Hounsou
- Brandon T. Jackson
- Samuel L. Jackson
- Daniel Kaluuya
- Anthony Mackie
- Jason Mitchell
- Eddie Murphy
- Nate Parker
- Ving Rhames
- Wesley Snipes
- LaKeith Stanfield
- Michael K. Williams

== Multiple nominations from the same film ==
- Terrence Howard (winner) and Ludacris in Crash (2006)
- Jeffrey Wright (winner), Mos Def and Eamonn Walker in Cadillac Records (2008)
- Corey Hawkins and Jason Mitchell in Straight Outta Compton (2016)
- Mahershala Ali (winner), Andre Holland & Ashton Sanders in Moonlight (2017)
- Jovan Adepo & Stephen Henderson in Fences (2017)
- Aldis Hodge & Leslie Odom Jr. in One Night in Miami... (2021)
- Idris Elba & LaKeith Stanfield in The Harder They Fall (2022)

== Age superlatives ==
Record	Actor	Film	Age (in years)
Oldest winner	Samuel L. Jackson	Django Unchained	63
Oldest nominee	Morgan Freeman	Million Dollar Baby	67
Youngest winner	Barkhad Abdi	Captain Phillips	28
Youngest nominee	Rob Brown	Finding Forrester	16
