= Annika Noelle =

American actress

- Born: December 24, 1986 (age 39); Boston, Massachusetts, U.S.
- Occupation: Actress
- Years active: 2010–present
- Known for: The Bold and The Beautiful
- Notable credit: Hope Logan
- Height: 1.70 m (5 ft 6.93 in)
- Spouse: John Patrick Amedori (m. 2025)

Annika Noelle (born December 24, 1986) is an American actress. Since 2018, she has portrayed the role of Hope Logan on The Bold and the Beautiful.

== Early life ==
Annika Noelle was born in Boston, Massachusetts. Since she was a child she showed interest in the performing arts, so when she was older she left her hometown to move to Los Angeles and attend the School of Theater, Film, and Television at the University of California, Los Angeles.

== Career ==
Noelle completed her acting studies at the University of California, Los Angeles. And in 2011 she played the role of Suzanna Wayne in the television film Love's Christmas Journey directed by David S. Cass Sr. In the same year she starred in the short films Sea Sick directed by Patrick Brooks and Found directed by Anthony Bushman. Also in 2011, she participated in the music video "Howlin' for You" by The Black Keys and directed by Chris Marrs Piliero. In 2011 and 2012 she played the role of Sami Nelson in the series Venice: The Series. In 2014, she went on to play the role of Nick's Date in the film Jersey Boys directed by Clint Eastwood where she sang a live version of A Sunday Kind of Love. In 2015, she had a recurring role in Chasing Life (as Abbi / Intern). In the same year she played the role of Melissa Jennings in the film Evan's Crime directed by Sandy Tung. In 2017 she played the role of Aubrey in the film True to the Game directed by Preston A. Whitmore II.

Since 2018, she has portrayed the role of Hope Logan on the CBS soap opera The Bold and the Beautiful. In the following years, she participated in the game show Let's Make a Deal. That same year she was nominated at the Daytime Emmy Awards for Outstanding Supporting Actress in a Drama Series for her role on The Bold and the Beautiful.

== Personal life ==
In October 2021, Noelle revealed she had suffered two miscarriages in an essay for Glamour. In June 2023, she announced the relationship with her fiancé had ended.

In February 2024, Noelle publicly revealed her relationship with actor John Patrick Amedori; that November, the couple announced their engagement. They married on 5 October 2025 in Agoura, California.

== Filmography ==
=== Films ===
Year	Title	Role	Director	Notes
2010	The After Party	Katherine Shields	Stephen Anderson	Short film
2010	The Perfect Gentleman	Jonathan's Temptress	Michael Rohrbaugh	Short film
2010	$weethearts	Cheryl	Andrew Ritter	Short film
2010	Acts of God	Mitzy	Anthony Bushman	Short film
2011	Found	Eve	Anthony Bushman	Short film
2011	Sea Sick	Claire	Patrick Brooks	
2012	Pretty Pictures	Marcy	Christina Sun Kim	Short film
2014	Head Trauma	Zoe	Kristine Namkung	Short film
2014	The Night Before	Ashley	Carlton Gillespie	Short film
2014	Jersey Boys	Nick's Date	Clint Eastwood	
2015	Evan's Crime	Melissa Jennings	Sandy Tung	
2017	True to the Game	Aubrey	Preston A. Whitmore II	
2023	Holiday in the Vineyards	Emma Dixon	Alex Ranarivelo	Netflix film

=== Television ===
Year	Title	Role	Notes
2011	Love's Christmas Journey	Suzanna Wayne	Hallmark Channel television film
2011–2012	Venice: The Series	Sami Nelson	12 episodes
2015	Bree Does Comedy	Kathy	Episode: "Bree Does Improv"
2015	Chasing Life	Abbi / Intern	2 episodes
2018–present	The Bold and the Beautiful	Hope Logan	Regular role
2020	Let's Make a Deal	Herself	Episode: "Wayne's Favorite Folks Week – Day 4"
2023	The Price Is Right	Herself	Episode: "Episode #51.141"

=== Music videos ===
Year	Artist	Title	Role	Director
2011	The Black Keys	"Howlin' for You"	Townsperson	Chris Marrs Piliero

== Awards and nominations ==
Year	Award	Category	Work	Result
2020	Daytime Emmy Award	Outstanding Supporting Actress in a Drama Series	The Bold and the Beautiful	Nominated
2024	Daytime Emmy Award	Outstanding Lead Actress in a Drama Series	The Bold and the Beautiful	Nominated
