= Erica Peeples =

American actress

- Born: May 22, 1984 (age 42); Mount Clemens, Michigan, U.S
- Occupation: Actress
- Years active: 2007–present

Erica Peeples (born May 22, 1984) is an American actress and producer.

== Life and career ==
Peeples was born and raised in Mount Clemens, Michigan. She attended Macomb Community College and Mosaic Youth Theatre of Detroit before moving to New York City to attend Juilliard School. She later performed in a number of off-Broadway and regional productions, including Joe Turner's Come and Gone, A Raisin in the Sun and The Piano Lesson. She made her television debut appearing in an episode of Law & Order: Criminal Intent in 2007, and later had minor role in the comedy film, Today's Special (2009).

In 2017, Peeples played the female leading role of Gena Rollins in the crime drama film, True to the Game based on Teri Woods's novel of the same name. She reprised her role in its sequels, True to the Game 2 (2020) and True to the Game 3 (2021). In 2019 she starred in the comedy film Fall Girls and appeared in the crime drama film, Gully. From 2020 to 2021 she had the recurring role in the CW drama series, All American. In 2022, Peeples played the lead in the crime thriller film, Trophy Wife for BET+. Later that year she starred alongside Tami Roman in the BET drama series, Haus of Vicious, and starred in the Holiday comedy-drama film, All I Want for Christmas for Hulu.

In 2023, Peeples starred in six movies: the indie thriller Survival, the psychological thriller The Pass for Peacock, the mystery thriller Deadly Desire for Allblk, the horror-thriller Paradies 2 for BET+, the drama Heart for the Holidays for BET+, and the horror film What Lies Under the Tree. In 2024, Peeples starred in the science fiction film, Lunar Lockdown for Allblk, and appeared in the action thriller film, Lights Out.

== Filmography ==
=== Film ===
Year	Title	Role	Notes
2007	Fighter	A.J.	Short
2009	Today's Special	Waitress	
2009	Return to the Doghouse	Judge #3	Short
2017	True to the Game	Gena Rollins	
2019	Fall Girls	Lexy	
2019	Gully	Mrs. Burnett	
2020	Trigger	Carmen	
2020	True to the Game 2	Gena Rollins	
2021	Hub City	Shasta	
2021	Flint Tale	Poppy	
2021	True to the Game 3	Gena Rollins	
2022	Trophy Wife	Toni Carter	TV movie
2022	All I Want for Christmas	Mariah	
2022	Men of the House	Aurora	Short
2022	When a Man Is Good for You	Crystal Love	Short
2023	Life Without Hope: A New Chapter	Hope	
2023	The Pass	Terra	
2023	Deadly Desire	Melody	
2023	Paradies 2	Erica	Producer
2023	Heart for the Holidays	Rachel Grant	
2023	What Lies Under the Tree	Christina	
2023	Survival	Vanessa Tubman	
2024	Lunar Lockdown	Danielle	
2024	Lights Out	Rachel	

=== Television ===
Year	Title	Role	Notes
2007	Law & Order: Criminal Intent	Samantha Joosten	Episode: "Seeds"
2020–21	All American	Monique "Mo" Moore	Guest: Season 2, Recurring Cast: Season 3
2022	Haus of Vicious	Jaelyn Ryan	Main Cast
