= Ronald Warner =

Ronald or Ron Warner may refer to:

- Ron Warner (American football) (born 1979), American football player
- Ron Warner (baseball) (born 1968), American baseball player and manager
- Ronnie Warner (born 1965), American actor, producer and writer
