= Neema Barnette =

American film and television director

- Born: December 14, 1949 (age 76); New York City, United States
- Occupations: Director, producer
- Years active: 1982–present
- Spouse: Reed R. McCants (1 child)

Neema Barnette is an American film director and producer, and the first African-American woman to direct a primetime sitcom. Barnette was the first African-American woman to get a three-picture deal with Sony Pictures. Since then, she accumulated a number of awards, including a Peabody, an Emmy and an NAACP Image Award.

== Early life ==
Neema Barnette, born on December 14, 1949, to African parentage. She attended the High School For The Performing Arts, and began her career as a stage actress. Barnette continued her education by attending The City College of New York earning a BA. She also received a MFA from NYU School Of The Arts.

== Career ==
At age 21, Barnette directed the play The Blue Journey by OyamO, at Joseph Papp's Public Theater. In 1982, Barnette co-produced the Emmy Award-winning After-School Special, "To Be a Man" along with Cliff Frazier, who was also the writer and director. The both won Emmys for Outstanding Children's Programming. The movie starred Robert Earl Jones, Estelle Evans, Stuart Bascombe, Julius Hollingsworth and Curtis Worthy. James Earl Jones was executive director.

Barnette has directed for the stage, episodic television, made-for-TV movies and feature films. Sky Captain was her first short film, which she directed as part of the American Film Institute's (AFI) Directing Workshop for Women in 1985.

In 1990, she founded Harlem Girl Productions Corporation. Since 1997, Barnette has also worked for the Harlem Lite Productions. She has directed multiple seasons and episodes of various television sitcoms including A Different World, The Cosby Show, Gilmore Girls, and 7th Heaven.

In 1997, Barnette directed the film Spirit Lost, a psychological thriller with a love triangle with a ghost. Robin R. Means Coleman wrote in her book Horror Noire that Spirit Lost was a "rare horror film that was nearly an all-female affair" and that the film prominently featured characters that served as moral arbiter and saviors. She would later revisit the film in her 2023 work The Black Guy Dies First, further noting the codependent relationship between John and the ghostly Arabella.

In 2002, she was selected as one of ten artists to judge the American Film Institute's "Best Films Award".

In 2003, Barnette directed her first feature film, Civil Brand. She told the Los Angeles Times it was inspired by the original screenplay by Preston A Whitmore II and an urban women's prison tale. The shoot was extremely difficult, with members of cast and crew coming down with pneumonia, leading to production being shut down for a year. Before her mother died, she encouraged Barnette to continue pursuing the film. Once the movie was completed, it earned many awards and played film festivals like Sundance, the American Film Institute, and the American Black Film Festival in Miami where Civil Brand won the $15,000 Blockbuster audience award.

Her most recent feature film is Woman Thou Art Loosed: On the 7th Day (2012), her 11th movie and third for theatrical release. The film is a thriller and family drama following the story of a marriage on the rocks, which received an NAACP Image Award Nomination for Best Independent Feature in 2012. Barnette directed two episodes of Being Mary Jane: "Hot Seat" and "Don't Call It A Comeback" (2015 - Season 3). Barnette is the Executive Producer of Black History Mini Docs, 90 second videos featuring the stories of African-American heroes and she-roes, as well as daily tributes which are posted on Facebook, Twitter & Pinterest.

In 2009 Barnette directed a gospel musical film, "Heaven Ain't Hard to Find," starring Kim Whitley, Cliff Powell and Reed McCants, where it previewed on platforms on HBO and BET.

In 2016, she joined the series Queen Sugar as director and producer.

Barnette won her first NAACP Image Award for her directing efforts, like "One More Hurdle," an NBC dramatic special. Another documentary of hers titled "The Silent Crime," an NBC about domestic violence, received four local Emmy nominations. Her successful debut resulted in subsequent directing stints on "Hooperman," "The Royal Family," "China Beach" (Peabody Award), "Frank's Place" (Emmy Award), "The Sinbad Show," "Diagnosis Murder," "A Different World" and many episodes of "The Cosby Show."

Neema Barnette is also part of the DGA African American Steering Committee and a member of The Black Filmmakers Foundation since its inception. She is also an active AFI alumnus and takes part on the panel of the AFI Independent Film committee. She has also played a part in being on the executive board of the IFP Gordon Parks Scholarship fund. She has been a judge for the NAACP Feature Film Award and serves as an annual judge for the Pan African Film Festival in Los Angeles.

== Personal life ==
Barnette owns her own production company called Harlem Girl Productions. Barnette is a part-time professor, where she teaches aspiring students a directing course at UCLA and USC. She spends the other part of her time as the executive director of a theatre and performance company for young artists, Live Theatre Gang, which she runs with her husband, actor Reed R. McCants. She also owns a production company, Reel Rebel Productions, with McCants.

== Filmography ==
=== Films Directed ===
- Super Sweet 16: The Movie (2007)
- All You've Got (2005)
- Zora Is My Name!
- Better Off Dead
- Run for the Dream: The Gail Devers Story
- Close to Danger
- Spirit Lost
- Woman Thou Art Loosed: On the 7th Day
- Heaven Ain't Hard to Find
- Better off Dead

=== Television Directed ===
- Naomi - Enigma
- The Equalizer Episode - Separated
- Genius: Aretha Episode 2 - Until The Real Thing Comes Along
- Genius: Aretha Episode 3 - Do Right Woman 2021
- Paradise Lost 2020
- Black Lightning 2019
- Raising Dion 2019
- Midnight, Texas 2018
- The Good Cop 2018
- Love is _ 2018
- Luke Cage 2018
- Blind Spot 2018
- The Breaks 2017
- Being Mary Jane 2015-2017
- Queen Sugar 2016
- Miracle's Boys 2005
- Gilmore Girls
- The PJs
- Diagnosis Murder 1994-1998
- 7th Heaven
- Deadly Games 1996
- The Cosby Mysteries 1994-1995
- Scattered Dreams 1993
- The Sinbad Show 1993
- The Royal Family 1991
- Different Worlds: A Story of Interracial Love
- The Cosby Show 1989-1991
- A Different World 1990-1991
- Zora Is My Name! 1990
- China Beach 1990
- The Robert Guillaume Show 1989
- It's a Living 1988-1989
- Hooperman 1989
- Frank's Place 1987
- What's Happening Now 1986
- One More Hurdle (1984)

=== Produced ===
- King of Stage: The Woodie King Jr. Story (Documentary) (executive producer)
- 2016 Queen Sugar (TV Series) (producer - 13 episodes)
- 2012 Woman Thou Art Loosed: On the 7th Day (producer)
- 2008 Cuttin Da Mustard (executive producer) / (producer)
- 2002 Civil Brand (producer)
- 1986 "To Be A Man", an ABC Television Children's Special, (producer)

== Awards ==
She has won numerous awards, honors, and nominations, among them an Emmy Award for her afterschool special To Be a Man, two NAACP Image Awards, and a Sundance Film Festival Award.

- The Silent Crime, an American Women in Radio & Television award for directing.
- Barnette won an International Monitor Award for Best Director for The Cosby Show episode, 'The Day the Spores Landed.'
- ZORA IS MY NAME (American Playhouse production starring Ruby Dee which won a Lilly Award for Exceptional Representation of African American Images in Film)
- One More Hurdle,” an NBC dramatic special, won Neema her first NAACP Image® Award for her directing efforts.
- While directing an episode for Cosby in which Mr. Cosby gets pregnant, “The Day The Spores Landed” (International Monitor® Award for Best Director)
- The Delta Society awarded Neema their prestigious Lilly® Award for exceptional representation of African American images in film.
- The Cosby Mysteries. “ For one episode she directed the show received a Peabody® and Emmy® Award.

YEAR	AWARDS	ORGANIZATION	NOMINATED WORK	RESULT
1983 (April)	Outstanding Children's Programming Award	Emmy Award	To Be A Man	Winner
1993	Outstanding Directorial Achievement in Dramatic Shows - Daytime	American Black Film Festival	CBS Schoolbreak Special (1984) For episode "Different Worlds: A Story of Interracial Love	Nominee
2002 (August)	Special Jury Prize Audience Award	Urbanworld Film Festival	Civil Brand	Winner
2002 (June)	Blockbuster Audience Award	The Black American Film Festival	Civil Brand	Winner
2003 (April)	Audience Award Official Selection Filin	Roxbury Black Film Festival n. Philadelphia Film Festival	Civil Brand	Winner
2003 (February)	Festival Award Sojourner Truth Award	Pan-African Film Festival	Civil Brand	Winner
2006 (March)	Best Director - Television	Black Reel Awards	Miracle's Boys	Winner
2017	Trailblazer	Reel Sistas of the Diaspora NY Women in Film	Herself	Nominee
