= Fled =

1996 film directed by Kevin Hooks

- Theatrical release poster
- Directed by: Kevin Hooks
- Written by: Preston A. Whitmore II
- Produced by: Frank Mancuso, Jr.
- Starring: Laurence Fishburne; Stephen Baldwin; Salma Hayek; Will Patton; Robert John Burke
- Cinematography: Matthew F. Leonetti
- Edited by: Richard Nord; Joseph Gutowski
- Music by: Graeme Revell
- Production companies: Metro-Goldwyn-Mayer Pictures; Frank Mancuso Jr. Productions
- Distributed by: MGM/UA Distribution Co. (United States); United International Pictures (International)
- Release date: July 19, 1996
- Running time: 98 minutes
- Country: United States
- Language: English
- Budget: $25 million
- Box office: $17,193,231

Fled is a 1996 American buddy action comedy film directed by Kevin Hooks. It stars Laurence Fishburne and Stephen Baldwin as two prisoners chained together who flee during an escape attempt gone bad.

== Plot ==
An interrogator prepares a man to take the stand against mob boss Frank Matajano on an Air Force base. A driver delivers takeout, which is taken to the interrogation room. Once opened, it explodes, killing the witness. In court, a judge places court on recess until the attorney general can bring sufficient evidence against Matajano. The attorney general angrily demands a U.S. marshal, Pat Schiller (Robert John Burke), get evidence in 72 hours to replace the killed witness.

On a chain gang, an inmate harasses Luke Dodge (Stephen Baldwin), who fights back. When Charles Piper (Laurence Fishburne) intervenes, the guards chain him and Dodge together, and then Dodge and Piper begin fighting. The guards discuss a plan in hushed tones and change their magazines, but before they do anything, the inmate who attacked Dodge snatches a gun and starts a shootout. During the confusion, Dodge and Piper escape. The cop who arrested Dodge, Matthew 'Gib' Gibson (Will Patton) picks up a magazine at the crime scene. A fellow cop informs him that the attorney general asked him to place Dodge on that chain gang against protocol. Suspicious, he runs off into the woods and finds the third convict, who is shot and killed by Marshal Schiller. Dodge and Piper argue about their plan; Dodge reveals he needs to escape to collect $5 million he stole. Piper demands half in exchange for his help.

Gibson begins to grow suspicious of the marshal's motives and circumstances when he finds out the company from which Dodge stole the money by hacking did not press charges; the company is owned by Matajano. Matajano commissions the hitman from the food delivery to recover a computer disc from, then kill, Dodge. Gibson reveals the magazine he found at the escape scene had blanks—the guards were never intended to kill anyone, and it was supposed to be a setup.

Piper and Dodge are cornered by a hunter whom Piper attacks, causing him to have a heart attack. They take his car and drop his body at a hospital, then demand a woman named Cora (Salma Hayek) drive them to a hideout. At her house, they change clothes and part ways—Piper gives Dodge his harmonica for good luck. Dodge goes to a strip club to meet up with his girlfriend; after arranging to meet his hacking partner, Puffy, at a massage parlor to hand off the disc, Matajano's thugs enter their hotel room and kill her and begin to torture Dodge. Piper arrives and kills several of the hitmen, escaping with Dodge. He reveals that he's an undercover cop that Marshal Schiller hired to break Dodge out of prison so that he could recover the disc in exchange for exonerating him from an undercover drug bust that went bad in New York. The disc has evidence the attorney general needs against Matajano.

At the massage parlor, Dodge meets up with Puffy, who is immediately shot by Matajano's men. Gibson, who hired a private investigator to get him information on Dodge, also arrives and participates in the gunfight. Piper and Dodge escape on special Ducati motorcycles left by Puffy; Gibson is reprimanded for not leaving the case to the attorney general. Not knowing the location of the disc, Piper and Dodge get desperate. Dodge notices a clue on his bike that lead them to the Georgia Dome and the disc, with Cora's help. The marshal (revealed to be working for Matajano to get the disc before the attorney general), Gibson, Dodge and Piper all end up in a gunfight. Piper and Dodge again escape with Cora's help, telling the attorney general they will hand off the disc at the top of Stone Mountain.

Dodge and Piper lead Matajano's men on a chase up the mountain which results in Piper killing them; he meets up with Dodge and they ride a skycar up the mountain. The marshal, presumed dead in the gunfight, stops the car and demands the disc. Piper eventually throws him from the car and they hand the disc off to the attorney general, who exonerates them both and gets Piper his job back in New York.

== Cast ==
- Laurence Fishburne as Charles Piper
- Stephen Baldwin as Luke Dodge
- Salma Hayek as Cora
- Will Patton as Detective Matthew 'Gib' Gibson
- Robert John Burke as U.S. Marshal Pat Schiller
- Robert Hooks as Lieutenant Henry Clark
- Victor Rivers as Rico Santiago
- David Dukes as District Attorney Chris Paine
- Ken Jenkins as Warden Nichols
- Michael Nader as Frank Mantajano
- Brittney Powell as Cindy Henderson / Faith
- Steve Carlisle as Herb Foster
- Brett Rice as Officer Thornhill
- Anderson Martin as Officer Kevin
- Gary Yates as Sergeant Bailey
- J. Don Ferguson as Chairman
- Kathy Payne as Margaret Parks
- Robert Apisa as Jose Marti
- Jon Huffman as Milliner
- Bob Hannah as Mason
- Angela Elayne Gibbs as Jocelyn
- Michael Cary Hooks as Vonte
- Joe Torry as Bo Grant
- Bill Bellamy as Ray
- Taurean Blacque as Les
- K. Addison Young as 'Puffy'
- Libby Whittemore as Sandra
- David Dwyer as Sergeant Leonard
- RuPaul as himself
- Kenny Endoso as Manny, Mantajano Thug (uncredited)
- Jay Amor as Mantajano Thug (uncredited)
- Henry Kingi Jr. as Mantajano Thug (uncredited)
- Baby Norman as Exotic Dancer (uncredited)

== Soundtrack ==
A soundtrack consisting of mostly hip hop and R&B music was released on July 15, 1996, by Arista Records and Rowdy Records. It peaked at #60 on the Top R&B/Hip-Hop Albums.

== Reception ==
=== Critical response ===
Fled was widely panned by critics. It holds an 18% rating on review aggregation website Rotten Tomatoes based on 33 reviews, with an average score of 4.36/10.

Audiences polled by CinemaScore gave the film an average grade of "B+" on an A+ to F scale.

"Stephen 'After Alec but better than Billy' Baldwin is one of two convicts on the run," wrote OK!. "Laurence The Matrix Fishburne is the other. Saucy Salma Hayek and Will Armageddon Patton are in there too. So now you don't have to actually watch it."

=== Box office ===
The film opened at No. 6 at the North American box office with $5.4 million. In total it made $17.2 million in the domestic market and didn't get a worldwide release, failing to recover its $25 million budget during its theatrical run.
