= Puff, Puff, Pass =

- Directed by: Mekhi Phifer
- Written by: Kent George; Ronnie Warner
- Produced by: Will Packer; Rob Hardy
- Starring: Danny Masterson; Mekhi Phifer; Ronnie Warner; LaVan Davis; Terry Crews; John C. McGinley; Jonathan Banks; David Faustino; Constance Marie
- Cinematography: Arthur Albert
- Edited by: Vince Filippone
- Music by: Todd Mushaw
- Distributed by: Sony Pictures
- Release date: May 9, 2006
- Running time: 95 minutes
- Country: United States
- Language: English

Puff, Puff, Pass is a 2006 comedy crime film, also known as Living High, directed by Mekhi Phifer.

== Plot ==
The film opens with an infomercial, given by Dick Dupre (a parody of Don Lapre, played by John C. McGinley), which Larry (Danny Masterson) and Rico (Ronnie Warner) are watching. Larry and Rico are two stoners who live in a one-room apartment, and after watching the entire infomercial, they decide to start a "tiny classified ads" business. This is a running gag throughout the film. Each time they explain their new "business," someone asks, "Ads for what?", and they respond confidently, "That's not the point! It's complex" or "The ads themselves... they generate income", simply quoting the infomercial.

After the two are locked out of their apartment by their landlord Lance (Jonathan Banks) for being late on rent, the two are stuck for a way to get cable television so they can watch The Shawshank Redemption during a 24-hour marathon on TNT. Larry, in despair because his car won't start and they will miss "the Shank," remembers a rehab brochure he picked up, and decides that he had reached "his bottom", and needs to go to rehab. Rico decides to go with him after he sees in the brochure that the clinic has basic cable.

In rehab, the two stoners quickly find themselves out of place among the hard drug addicts there, not to mention the counselors. Beside this, they also find out that the brochure was false, and they only have eight channels and no TNT. After spending their first night messing with junkies and each having a one-night stand with the women in rehab, the two are kicked out. They decide to go to see Big Daddy (Mekhi Phifer), a wealthy acquaintance of theirs.

Big Daddy thinks that Larry and Rico are two guys his girlfriend Elise (Ashley Scott) has set up for his sale of an expensive collection of antique Indian Head pennies. The buyer is an aspiring rapper named Cool Crush Ice Killa (Terry Crews), who wants to meet Larry and Rico at a bus station with the money. They forget the coins in Larry's car, and in a panic they run from the bus station with the money, with Ice Killa chasing them. They go back to Big Daddy's, where Ice Killa, who has a great fear of dogs, is chased up a tree by Big Daddy's trained guard dog. Larry, Rico, and Big Daddy then find out that Elise and Ice Killa were trying to steal the coins. Big Daddy then asks Larry and Rico to work for him in his investment in beachfront property in Nicaragua. At the airport, they run into Dupre, whose infomercials turned out to be a scam, and is now also investing in Nicaragua.

The movie ends with another infomercial, this time featuring Dupre, Larry and Rico. Back at the apartment, two new stoners (Jaleel White and Paulo Costanzo) are being told off by Lance for being late on rent, when Larry and Rico appear on the TV telling of their new fortunes. The new tenants hail them as brilliant, yelling "Nicaragua!" victoriously. In complete disbelief, Lance decides to inhale from their joint.

== Cast ==
- Danny Masterson as Larry
- Ronnie Warner as Rico
- Mekhi Phifer as Big Daddy
- John C. McGinley as Jerry Dupre
- Jonathan Banks as Lance
- Ashley Scott as Elise
- Terry Crews as Cool Crush Ice Killa
- Darrell Hammond as Jonathan
- David Faustino as Steve
- Jason Stuart as Chet
- Constance Marie as Montana
- Kristen Miller as Aimee (as Kristin Miller)
- LaVan Davis as Otis
- Justin Chon as Bobbi
- Paulo Costanzo as Tenant #1
- Jaleel White as Tenant #2
- Mo Collins as Linda
- Lindsay Hollister as Heather
- Jazzmun as Lisa

== Reception ==
David Nusair of ReelFilm.com wrote: "Puff, Puff, Pass generally remains watchable, albeit in a mindless, sitcomesque sort of way (throw in a laugh track and you've got the latest Fox comedy). Masterson and Warner are convincing as drug-addicted morons, while the supporting cast (which also includes Married... with Children's David Faustino) provides sporadic instances of entertainment throughout the film. But the bottom line is that the movie just isn't funny, despite the best efforts of screenwriters Kent George and Warner (the only exception to this are the repeated references to The Shawshank Redemption, dubbed The Shank by Larry and Rico). Phifer, making his directorial debut here, infuses Puff, Puff, Pass with all the style of a movie-of-the-week; consequently, one can't help but wonder why he chose this as his initial foray into the world of filmmaking."

Christopher Armstead of Film Critics United said that it was "a fairly amateurish, poorly edited, overlit, mess of a movie... But damn it all to hell, this nonsense made me laugh." He continued: "Crazy stuff happens there which leads to them getting evicted, but having met Big Daddy (Phifer), they agree to be the go between in selling some of his wooden nickels in a scam involving Big Daddy's girlfriend Elise (Ashley Scott) and her accomplice, hopeful rapper Ice Cold Crush (Terry Crews). Toss in a couple of transvestites, a horny Jesus freak, an homage to the Pulp Fiction rape scene and lots of 'Shawshank Redemption' references, and we have one hell of a mixed up confusing mess."

Scott Weinberg of eFilmCritic.com wrote: "There's not enough weed on the planet to make this movie funny... It's as if some stoner actor's home movies somehow got released onto DVD."
