= Cadillac Records =

2008 musical biographical film

- Theatrical release poster
- Directed by: Darnell Martin
- Written by: Darnell Martin
- Produced by: Sofia Sondervan; Andrew Lack
- Starring: Adrien Brody; Jeffrey Wright; Gabrielle Union; Columbus Short; Cedric the Entertainer; Emmanuelle Chriqui; Eamonn Walker; Mos Def; Beyoncé Knowles
- Cinematography: Anastas Michos
- Edited by: Peter C. Frank
- Music by: Terence Blanchard; Steve Jordan
- Production companies: TriStar Pictures; Sony Music Film; Parkwood Entertainment
- Distributed by: Sony Pictures Releasing
- Release dates: November 24, 2008 (Grauman's Egyptian Theatre); December 5, 2008 (United States)
- Running time: 109 minutes
- Country: United States
- Language: English
- Budget: $12 million
- Box office: $8.9 million

Cadillac Records is a 2008 American biographical drama film written and directed by Darnell Martin. The film explores the musical era from the early 1940s to the late 1960s, chronicling the life of the influential Chicago-based record-company executive Leonard Chess, and a few of the musicians who recorded for Chess Records.

The film stars Adrien Brody as Leonard Chess, Jeffrey Wright as Muddy Waters, Columbus Short as Little Walter, Cedric the Entertainer as Willie Dixon, Eamonn Walker as Howlin' Wolf, Mos Def as Chuck Berry, and Beyoncé Knowles as Etta James. The film was released in North America on December 5, 2008, by TriStar Pictures. The soundtrack was released on Music World/Columbia and Sony Music.

== Plot ==
In 1947 Chicago, Leonard Chess, a Polish Jewish immigrant and bar owner, becomes interested in electric blues after hiring a band that includes guitarist Muddy Waters and harmonica player Little Walter. Seeing that their music excites local Black audiences but is ignored by major labels, Leonard arranges recording sessions for Muddy. As Muddy's records gain radio play and move up the rhythm-and-blues charts, Leonard builds a record business around him and other South Side musicians, eventually forming Chess Records. His habit of rewarding successful artists with Cadillacs makes the label a symbol of opportunity, loyalty and conflict.

Muddy's success changes his life with Geneva Wade, who remains devoted to him despite his infidelity and the pressures of touring. Little Walter, brilliant but volatile, moves from supporting Muddy to becoming a star in his own right. His drinking, temper and jealousy increasingly strain his relationships with Muddy, Leonard and the other musicians. Willie Dixon, a bassist and songwriter, becomes a steadying presence at the label, helping shape the songs that define its sound.

Chess Records expands when Leonard signs Howlin' Wolf, whose powerful voice and disciplined manner challenge both Muddy and Leonard. Wolf insists on respect and proper payment, rejecting the charm and gifts Leonard uses with other artists. The rivalry between Muddy and Wolf, and the contrast between their personalities, reflects the growing tension between artistic brotherhood and the business realities of the label. Leonard treats the musicians like family while also profiting from their work and blurring personal and financial boundaries.

The label reaches a wider audience when Chuck Berry brings a sound that combines blues, country and teenage energy. His songs cross racial lines and attract white listeners, helping move rhythm and blues toward rock and roll. Berry's rise brings Chess Records national attention, but his career is interrupted by legal trouble. The company’s success becomes tied not only to talent, but also to racism, segregated venues, dishonest promoters and the changing pop market.

Leonard later signs Etta James, a gifted singer struggling with addiction, emotional insecurity and the pain of not knowing her father. He recognizes her talent and helps her record for Chess, while their closeness creates tension in his marriage to Revetta. Etta's performances bring a more polished soul sound to the label, but her heroin use and search for love make her career unstable. Leonard's attempts to protect her blur the line between care, control and desire.

Over time, the label's artists suffer the costs of fame. Little Walter's decline deepens after years of alcohol, violence and insecurity, and he dies after a street fight. Muddy grieves his friend while recognizing how much their lives and music have changed. As musical tastes shift in the 1960s, Chess Records loses some of its dominance. Leonard sells the company and plans a new life, but dies soon afterward. The film closes by emphasizing the legacy of Chess Records and the musicians whose blues recordings helped shape rock and roll.

== Cast ==
- Beyoncé Knowles as Etta James
- Adrien Brody as Leonard Chess
- Jeffrey Wright as McKinley Morganfield/Muddy Waters
- Cedric the Entertainer as Willie Dixon
- Gabrielle Union as Geneva Wade
- Columbus Short as Walter Jacobs/Little Walter
- Emmanuelle Chriqui as Revetta Chess
- Eamonn Walker as Chester Burnett/Howlin' Wolf
- Yasiin Bey as Chuck Berry
- Shiloh Fernandez as Phil Chess
- Jay O. Sanders as Mr. Feder
- Eric Bogosian as Alan Freed
- Kevin Mambo as Jimmy Rogers
- Marc Bonan as Keith Richards
- Tammy Blanchard as Isabelle Allen
- Q-Tip as hip hop artist
- Norman Reedus as Chess record engineer
- Vincent D'Onofrio as Mississippi DJ (uncredited)
- Elvis Presley as himself (archive footage; uncredited)

== Background ==
Leonard Chess was the co-founder of the 1950s American record label Chess Records, located in Chicago, Illinois. He ran the legendary company with his brother, Phil, through the 1950s and '60s. The label started selling records from the back of Chess' Cadillac, and launched the careers of legendary musical personalities such as blues singers and harmonica and guitar players Little Walter and Muddy Waters, Howlin' Wolf, soul legend Etta James and guitarist singer-songwriters Chuck Berry and Willie Dixon.

== Production ==
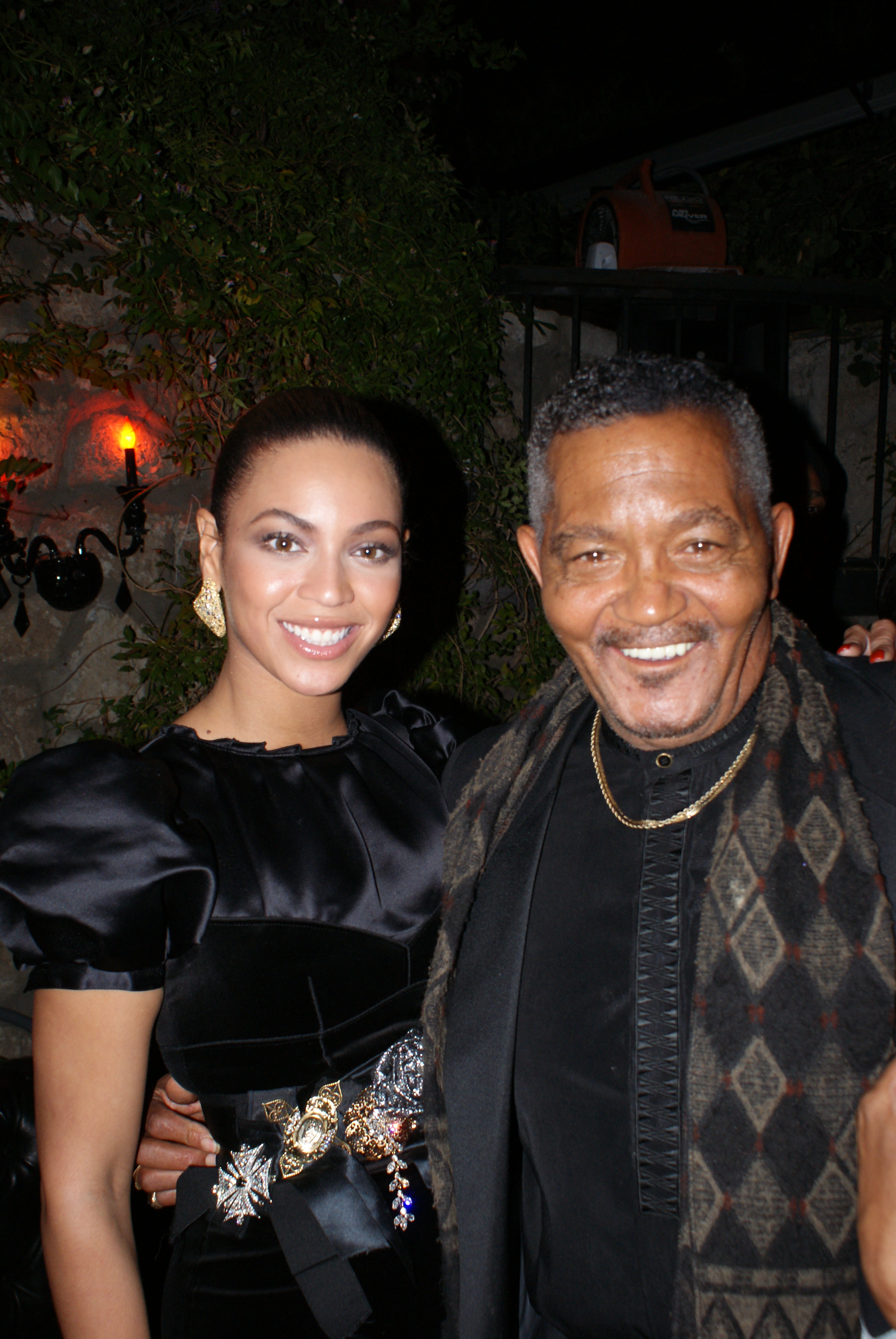
Beyoncé at the premiere party for the release of the film

The screenplay was written by director Darnell Martin. The filming of Cadillac Records started in February 2008. Filming locations included Louisiana, Mississippi, and New Jersey. Martin directed the film, financed by Sony BMG Film. Cadillac Records was produced by Andrew Lack and Sofia Sondervan, and co-executive produced by Beyoncé.

=== Casting ===
Originally, Matt Dillon was slated to play the role of Chess, but the role was ultimately given to Adrien Brody due to scheduling conflicts with Dillon. Early announcements of the cast also included Columbus Short as Little Walter, Golden Globe winner Jeffrey Wright as Muddy Waters, and multi-Grammy Award winner Beyoncé as Etta James. According to director Martin, the role of James was written with Beyoncé in mind.

As production increased, the roster grew to include Canadian actress Emmanuelle Chriqui as Revetta Chess, Tammy Blanchard as Isabelle Allen, English actor Eamonn Walker as Howlin' Wolf, and comedian Cedric the Entertainer as Willie Dixon. Final line ups of the cast also grew to include rapper Yasiin Bey as Chuck Berry, and Gabrielle Union in the role of Geneva Wade, Muddy Waters' common law wife.

=== Music ===
The American multi-instrumentalist, songwriter, and record producer Steve Jordan produced the soundtrack to the film. He also picked a group of blues musicians, including Billy Flynn (guitar), Larry Taylor (bass), Eddie Taylor Jr. (guitar), Barrelhouse Chuck (piano), Kim Wilson (harmonica), Danny Kortchmar (guitar), Hubert Sumlin (guitar), and Bill Sims (guitar) who, along with Jordan on drums, recorded all of the blues songs used in the film.

Beyoncé recorded five songs for the soundtrack, including a cover version of Etta James' "At Last" which was released on December 2, 2008 as its lead single. Mos Def, Jeffrey Wright, Columbus Short, and Eamonn Walker recorded songs for the soundtrack, and Raphael Saadiq, Beyoncé's sister Solange, Mary Mary, Nas, Buddy Guy, and Elvis Presley also appear on the album. The soundtrack was released in single and double-disc editions.

The month after the film was released, Beyoncé performed "At Last" at the inauguration ball of Barack Obama, as he and wife Michelle danced together for the first time as President and First Lady.

The soundtrack spent 48 weeks at number one of the Top Blues Albums.

The soundtrack was nominated for three 2010 Grammy Awards in the following categories: Best Compilation Soundtrack Album for Motion Picture, Television or Other Visual Media, Beyoncé's "Once in a Lifetime" for Best Song Written for Motion Picture, Television or Other Visual Media and Beyoncé's "At Last" for Best Traditional R&B Vocal Performance.

== Release and reception ==
The film had its world premiere on November 24, 2008, at the Egyptian Theatre in Los Angeles. On December 5, 2008, it entered general release in the United States. On its opening weekend, the film opened at Number 9, grossing $3.4 million in 686 cinemas with an $5,023 average. When the film left cinemas in January 2009, it had yet to recoup its $12 million budget; it ended its run with a worldwide box office gross of $8,880,045.

=== Critical reception ===
Rotten Tomatoes reports that 66% of 124 critics gave the film a positive review, with an average rating of 6.1/10. The website's critics consensus reads: "What Cadillac Records may lack in originality, it more than makes up for in strong performances and soul-stirring music." Another review aggregator, Metacritic, gave the film a weighted average score of 65 out of 100, based on 30 critics, indicating "generally favorable" reviews.

Roger Ebert of the Chicago Sun Times gave the film three stars and stated in his review that "The film is a fascinating record of the evolution of a black musical style, and the tangled motives of the white men who had an instinct for it." Elizabeth Weitzman of the Daily News awarded the film three stars and wrote in her review, "Writer-director Darnell Martin clearly respects the fact that the history of Chess Records is a worthy subject." Most critics praised the film for its music, but complained about its script. Jim Harrington of the San Jose Mercury News wrote in his review that, "Beyoncé Knowles' captivating voice and the film's other pluses can't outweigh the glaring omissions from the story line for this critic" and "Chess Records deserves, and will hopefully someday get, a better spin than the one delivered by Cadillac Records."

=== Recognition and accolades ===
David Edelstein of New York magazine named it the 4th best film of 2008, Stephanie Zacharek of Salon named it the 4th best film of 2008, and A. O. Scott of The New York Times named it the 10th best film of 2008. During the 2009 award season, Beyoncé received a Satellite Award nomination for her portrayal of Etta James. Beyoncé, Amanda Ghost, Scott McFarmon, Ian Dench, James Dring and Jody Street received a Golden Globe nomination, Best Original Song, for writing "Once in a Lifetime"; a song Beyoncé recorded for the film's soundtrack.

The film also garnered seven NAACP Image Award nominations, which included Outstanding Motion Picture, Outstanding Actor in a Motion Picture (Jeffrey Wright), Outstanding Supporting Actor in a Motion Picture (Cedric the Entertainer, Columbus Short and Yasiin Bey), and Outstanding Supporting Actress in a Motion Picture (Beyoncé).

=== Home media ===
The film was released on DVD and Blu-ray on March 10, 2009, and sold over 130,000 copies in its first week.

== Awards and nominations ==
| Ceremony | Category | Recipient | Result |
|---|---|---|---|
| African-American Film Critics Association | Best Supporting Actor | Jeffrey Wright | Won |
| Black Reel Award | Best Film | | Won |
| Black Reel Award | Best Ensemble | | Won |
| Black Reel Award | Best Director | Darnell Martin | Nominated |
| Black Reel Award | Best Screenplay, Adapted or Original | Darnell Martin | Nominated |
| Black Reel Award | Best Supporting Actor | Jeffrey Wright | Won |
| Black Reel Award | Best Supporting Actor | Eamonn Walker | Nominated |
| Black Reel Award | Best Supporting Actor | Yasiin Bey | Nominated |
| Black Reel Award | Best Breakthrough Performance | Columbus Short | Nominated |
| Golden Globe Award | Best Original Song | "Once In a Lifetime" | Nominated |
| Grammy Award | Best Song Written for Motion Picture, Television or Other Visual Media | "Once In a Lifetime" | Nominated |
| Grammy Award | Best Compilation Soundtrack Album for a Motion Picture, Television or Other Visual Media | | Nominated |
| Grammy Award | Best Traditional R&B Vocal Performance | "At Last" | Won |
| NAACP Image Award | Outstanding Motion Picture | | Nominated |
| NAACP Image Award | Outstanding Actor in a Motion Picture | Jeffrey Wright | Nominated |
| NAACP Image Award | Outstanding Supporting Actress in a Motion Picture | Beyoncé | Nominated |
| NAACP Image Award | Outstanding Supporting Actor in a Motion Picture | Cedric the Entertainer | Nominated |
| NAACP Image Award | Outstanding Supporting Actor in a Motion Picture | Columbus Short | Won |
| NAACP Image Award | Outstanding Supporting Actor in a Motion Picture | Mos Def | Nominated |
| NAACP Image Award | Outstanding Writing in a Motion Picture (Television or Film) | Darnell Martin | Nominated |
| Satellite Award | Best Supporting Actress in a Motion Picture | Beyoncé | Nominated |

== See also ==
- List of American films of 2008
- Cadillac Records: Music from the Motion Picture
