= Armored (film) =

- Theatrical release poster
- Directed by: Nimród Antal
- Written by: James V. Simpson
- Produced by: Josh Donen; Dan Farah
- Starring: Matt Dillon; Jean Reno; Laurence Fishburne; Amaury Nolasco; Milo Ventimiglia; Skeet Ulrich; Columbus Short; Fred Ward
- Cinematography: Andrzej Sekuła
- Edited by: Armen Minasian
- Music by: John Murphy
- Distributed by: Screen Gems (through Sony Pictures Releasing)
- Release date: December 4, 2009
- Running time: 88 minutes
- Country: United States
- Language: English
- Budget: $20 million
- Box office: $23.7 million

Armored is a 2009 American heist action thriller film directed by Nimród Antal, written by James V. Simpson, and starring Matt Dillon, Jean Reno, Laurence Fishburne, Amaury Nolasco, Milo Ventimiglia, Skeet Ulrich, and Columbus Short. It was released on December 4, 2009.

== Plot ==
Ty Hackett, a former armed service veteran is a member of Eagle Shield security in one of their many armored transportation teams. He is the legal guardian of younger brother Jimmy after the death of their parents. He is receiving constant letters about impending foreclosure on his home and the state is considering the placement of Jimmy in a foster home, due to his truancy and Ty's inability to adequately care for him. Ty is approached by Mike Cochrane, his godfather and co-worker, and informed of Mike's plan to steal $42 million being transferred from the Federal Reserve System to the local banks. Ty turns down the offer to participate in the crime.

The following morning, after receiving assurances from Mike that no one will be hurt, Ty reluctantly agrees to participate. The six-person crew offloads the first truck at an abandoned steel mill, but their plan is compromised when a homeless man living in the mill is spotted observing them. Baines shoots the potential witness and Mike delivers the fatal shot. Upset over this, Ty barricades himself inside the truck with the remaining $21 million inside. After an attempt to flee in the truck fails, Ty sets off the truck's alarm. The alarm catches the attention of Jake Eckehart, a local sheriff's deputy.

The remaining thieves plan to break into the truck by knocking the pins out of the door hinges. Jake arrives when Ty successfully restores power to the truck's alarm. Baines shoots Jake. Ty creates a distraction by burning the $21 million that’s been placed in the secret stash. While the thieves are distracted with the burning money, Ty sneaks Jake back into the truck. Dobbs begins to have second thoughts about the operation and agrees with Ty to get the fuse Mike removed from the engine. Dobbs is caught trying to put it back and Palmer stabs him to death.

As the thieves continue to remove the door hinges, Ty covers the interior windows with the remainder of the $21 million, pries the flooring of the armored truck to make an opening and takes Jake's radio to the roof in an attempt to contact the authorities. He is caught by Palmer, but Ty is able to convince Palmer that what they are doing is not right. Overwhelmed by guilt for his actions and killing Dobbs, Palmer consequently commits suicide. The remaining thieves reveal their possession of a kidnapped Jimmy. Ty complies with their demands, before Quinn and Baines head for the money. The two men are killed by a make shift bomb rigged by Ty in the money case.

Mike, who survived the explosion, chases after Ty in the working armored truck. But Ty is able to dodge the armored truck before it hits him and it crashes into a pit. The truck crushes Mike’s lower body which leads to his death. Later, as Jake is recovering in the hospital, Ashcroft tells Ty that Jake spoke of his efforts to stop the thieves. There is talk of giving Ty a reward. With Jimmy also being released from the hospital, Ty and Jimmy go home.

== Cast ==
- Columbus Short as Tyler "Ty" Hackett
- Matt Dillon as Mickey "Mike" Cochrane
- Laurence Fishburne as Baines
- Jean Reno as Quinn
- Skeet Ulrich as Dobbs
- Amaury Nolasco as Palmer
- Milo Ventimiglia as Officer Jake Eckehart
- Fred Ward as Duncan Ashcroft
- Andre Kinney as Jimmy Hackett

== Production ==
In October 2006, it was announced Screen Gems had acquired a spec script titled Armored. In October 2007, it was announced Matt Dillon and Columbus Short would topline the film.

Filming took place in Los Angeles.

== Reception ==
The film was not screened in advance to critics. The film received mostly negative reviews, getting a 42% rating on Rotten Tomatoes based on 55 critics surveyed. The site's consensus reads: "This B-grade thriller has a good cast and director but is undone by plot holes and messy conclusion". Audiences polled by CinemaScore gave the film an average grade of "B–" on an A+ to F scale.

A. O. Scott, in a New York Times review, wrote that the Hungarian director, Nimród Antal, "has an old-fashioned, functional style. […] He has made an unabashed B movie: basic, brutal and sometimes clumsy, but far from dumb, and not bad at all". The film doesn't minimize the seriousness of killing and conveys a bleak outlook on economic blight "with quiet passion and conviction", Scott wrote. The cinematography of Andrzej Sekuła (whose work also appears in Reservoir Dogs and Pulp Fiction) helps capture that mood, according to Scott.

The film was accidentally released by Sony on PlayStation Network free of charge, though it was pulled after an unspecified amount of time. The movie was issued while it was still showing in theaters, and although the mistake was eventually spotted, it is thought to have been downloaded thousands of times before the error was fixed.

== Home media ==
This movie was released as Armored on DVD Region 1 Anamorphic widescreen and Blu-ray Disc Region A formats on March 16, 2010.
