= Columbus Short =

American actor (born 1982)

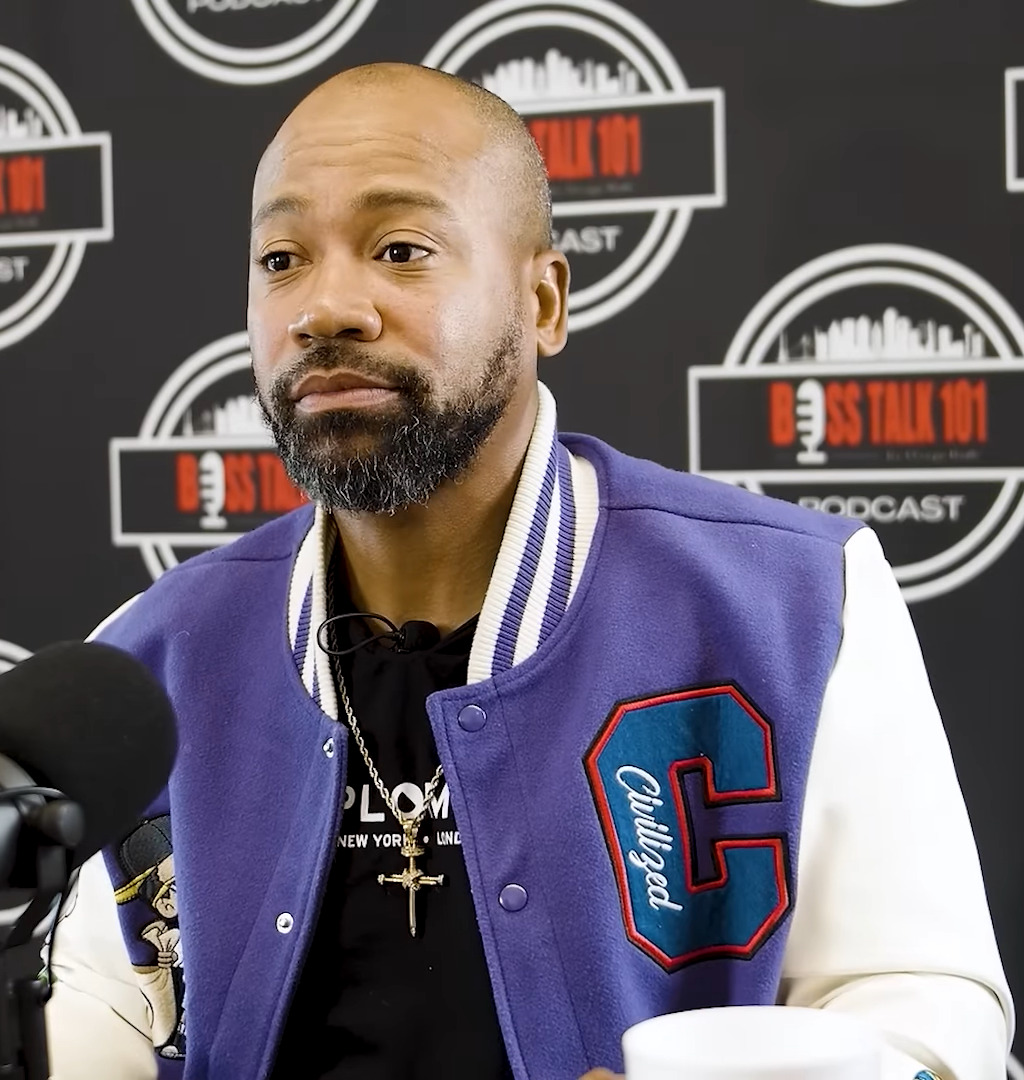
- Short in 2024
- Born: Columbus Keith Short, Jr. September 19, 1982 (age 44); Kansas City, Missouri, U.S.
- Occupations: Actor; choreographer
- Years active: 2004–present
- Spouse(s): Brandi Short (m. 2001; div. 2003) Tanee McCall (m. 2005; div. 2013) Aida Abramyan (m. 2016)
- Children: 4

Columbus Keith Short Jr. (born September 19, 1982) is an American actor and choreographer. He choreographed Britney Spears's Onyx Hotel Tour and worked with Brian Friedman. He is best known for his roles in the films Stomp the Yard, Cadillac Records, Armored, and The Losers. He previously starred on the television series Scandal as Harrison Wright for the first three seasons.

== Early life and education ==
Short was born in Kansas City, Missouri to a family he has described as "musical". His mother, Janette, has a talent management company. He has two brothers, John Rancipher and Chris Staples. Short relocated to Los Angeles when he was five years old and immediately began working in a youth theater. He attended Marcos De Niza High School in Tempe, Arizona, as well as El Segundo High School and the Orange County School of the Arts, before leaving to join the off-Broadway tour of Stomp.

== Career ==
Short's acting debut came as a dancer in film You Got Served in 2004 and he later appeared in comedy film Accepted in 2006, starring Justin Long. He then took lead roles in the direct-to-DVD movie Save the Last Dance 2 (2006) alongside Izabella Miko and Stomp the Yard (2007). He has also appeared twice in the Disney Channel Original Series That's So Raven as Trey, a member of the fictional boy band "Boyz n' Motion." Other TV appearances include ER and Judging Amy.

In 2006, he appeared in NBC's Studio 60 on the Sunset Strip as novice show-writer Darius Hawthorne. He was among the presenters at the 2007 NAACP Image Awards. In 2007, Columbus appeared in the movie This Christmas also starring Chris Brown and Lauren London. In 2008, Short appeared in the movie Quarantine, co-starring Jay Hernandez and Jennifer Carpenter, and played the part of musician Little Walter in Cadillac Records (2008), with Jeffrey Wright, Beyoncé Knowles, and Oscar-winner Adrien Brody. In 2010, he played "Pooch" in the film The Losers, based on the graphic novel, co-starring Jeffrey Dean Morgan, Chris Evans, and Zoe Saldaña, and directed by Sylvain White (who had already directed Short in Stomp the Yard).

== Personal life ==
Short was married to Brandi Short, but they split in 2003. They have a son. He married dancer Tanee McCall in 2005. She filed for divorce twice, once in September 2013 and again in April 2014. They have a daughter. He had a relationship with former video vixen Karrine Steffans before they split in 2016. Since 2016, Short has been married to Aida Abramyan. The couple have two sons together.

== Legal issues ==
In 2014, Short pleaded guilty to misdemeanor domestic violence and performed 30 hours of community service as part of a no-jail plea agreement after a violent altercation with his former wife, Tanee McCall.

Short also avoided jail by pleading no contest to a felony assault charge after throwing "a running punch" at his in-law during a family gathering at a bar. Short stated he was being taunted and acted in self-defense, and the victim admitted he took off his jersey and was prepared to fight Short before the punch caused a concussion and fractured eye socket.

In an interview with Access Hollywood Live, Short said that substance abuse, both alcoholism and cocaine use due to the stress of family issues and personal loss, led to his departure from Scandal.

In 2016, Short's then-partner, Karrine Steffans, was granted a temporary restraining order against him.

In 2018, Short served 34 days of a one-year sentence for violating probation when he assaulted his wife Aida Abramyan. Abramyan and Short were both granted restraining orders in 2025 after she claimed that Short had drunkenly strangled her during a violent dispute, the same day he claimed she had kicked their 10-week-old dog.

== Filmography ==
=== Film ===
Year	Title	Role	Notes
2004	You Got Served	Dancer	
2005	War of the Worlds	War of the Worlds Soldier	
2006	Accepted	Hands Holloway	
2006	Save the Last Dance 2	Miles Sultana	Video
2007	Stomp the Yard	DJ Williams	
2007	This Christmas	Claude Whitfield	
2008	Quarantine	Officer Danny Wilensky	
2008	Cadillac Records	Little Walter	
2009	Whiteout	Delfy	
2009	Armored	Ty Hackett	
2010	Death at a Funeral	Jeff Barnes	
2010	The Losers	Pooch	
2010	Stomp the Yard: Homecoming	DJ Williams	
2014	The End Again	Joe Maxwell	Short
2015	Fear Files	City Councilman Harvey Jordan	TV movie
2015	The Girl Is in Trouble	August	
2015	Mr. Right	Michael	
2015	Rocko Presents Food	Ceegee	Short
2015	Lucky Girl	Dillon	
2016	Definitely Divorcing	Eric	
2017	American Violence	Ben Woods	
2017	True to the Game	Quadir Richards	
2018	Armed	Turell	
2019	Atone	White	
2019	Dear Frank	George	
2020	Influence	Billy King	
2020	For NYC	Himself	Short
2020	True to the Game 2: Gena's Story	Quadir Richards	
2021	The Fight That Never Ends	Norris	TV movie
2021	True to the Game 3	Quadir Richards	
2022	Scott Free	Todd	
2022	Remember Me: The Mahalia Jackson Story	Martin Luther King, Jr.	
2023	The Bargain	Tunde Seymour	
2023	Life Without Hope 2: A New Chapter	Life	Replacing Andra Fuller: Tubi release
2023	Prince of Detroit	Harlow Black	
2023	Sisters	Kevin	
2023	Stay Out	Coffee Guy	TV movie
2024	Finding Tony	Detective Hash	
2025 or early 2026	The Prince of Detroit 2	Harlow Black	Pre—production

=== Television ===
Year	Title	Role	Notes
2005	ER	Loose	Episode: "Skin"
2005	Judging Amy	Thomas McNab	Episode: "The Paper War"
2005–06	That's So Raven	Trey	Guest cast: Seasons 3–4
2006–07	Studio 60 on the Sunset Strip	Darius Hawthorne	Recurring Cast
2012–14	Scandal	Harrison Wright	Main cast: Seasons 1–3
2020	Casting the Net	Hector	Episode: "A Purse Full of Dollars"
2022	Black Ink Crew: Compton	Himself	Episode: "New Teams, Same Dreams"
2022	Wicked City	The Handler	Episode: "A Debt Owed"

== Awards and nominations ==
- Black Reel Awards
  - 2008, Best Ensemble: Cadillac Records (Winner)
  - 2008, Best Breakthrough Performance: Cadillac Records (Nominated)
- Image Awards
  - 2009, Outstanding Supporting Actor in a Motion Picture: Cadillac Records (Winner)
  - 2008, Outstanding Actor in a Motion Picture: Stomp the Yard (Nominated)
- MTV Movie Awards
  - 2007, Breakthrough Performance: Stomp the Yard (Nominated)
  - 2007, Best Kiss: Stomp the Yard w/ Meagan Good (Nominated)
- Teen Choice Awards
  - 2007, Best Dance: Stomp the Yard (Nominated)
