= Lights Out (2024 film) =

Film by Christian Sesma

- Release poster
- Directed by: Christian Sesma
- Screenplay by: Chad Law; Garry Charles
- Story by: Brandon Burrows
- Produced by: Brandon Burrows
- Starring: Frank Grillo; Mekhi Phifer; Jaime King; Dermot Mulroney; Scott Adkins
- Cinematography: AJ. Rickert-Epstein
- Edited by: Alex Merkin; Brian Zwiener; James Kondelik
- Music by: War & Peace
- Production company: Firebrand
- Distributed by: Quiver Distribution
- Release date: February 16, 2024
- Running time: 86 minutes
- Country: United States
- Language: English

Lights Out is a 2024 American action thriller film directed by Christian Sesma and starring Frank Grillo, Mekhi Phifer, Jaime King, with Dermot Mulroney and Scott Adkins.

The film was released in the United States by Quiver Distribution on February 16, 2024.

== Premise ==
Duffy (Frank Grillo), a drifter and veteran haunted by combat and the deaths of comrades he saw as brothers, can't settle down because his time in active service caused such upheaval in his life. He wanders from place to place with only a suitcase and the drive to make just enough money to get to his next stop. His current perch is Los Angeles. He gets into a fight in a roadhouse bar when someone tries to cheat him out of his winnings at poker and easily beats up a group of bullies.

Max (Mekhi Phifer), an ex-con manager of fighters for an underground fight club, watches him easily handle the two bullies and sees in Duffy a lot of skill, potential, anger, and a need to prove himself. Max's brother, a veteran as well who committed suicide because he didn't have an outlet for his rage and isolation, was like Duffy. Max worries that Duffy could end up the same way. Max gives Duffy a chance to win some money for the both of them, as well as a temporary home with himself, his sister Rachel and her daughter.

Max needs the money to repay Sage, one of the villains who runs a gym and the underground fights. Sage's boss is Ellen Ridgeway, a police detective who uses her official status to intimidate the entire criminal operation, keeping it under her control. Duffy wins the fight and the money but he becomes unintentionally entangled in a complicated web because it was Rachel's abusive boyfriend who had stolen the money from Sage and Ridgeway in the first place.

== Cast ==
- Frank Grillo as Michael "Duffy" Duffield, a homeless veteran
- Mekhi Phifer as Max Bomer, an ex-con
- Jaime King as Ellen Ridgway, a police officer and Sage's boss
- Dermot Mulroney as Sage Parker, a crime boss
- Scott Adkins as Don "The Reaper" Richter
- Donald Cerrone as Carter
- Amaury Nolasco as Fosco
- JuJu Chan as Lynx
- Justin Furstenfeld as Stan "The Man" Lazare
- Erica Peeples as Rachel Bomer
- Paul Sloan as Detective Kincaid

== Production ==
In January 2022, it was reported that Frank Grillo, Mekhi Phifer, Scott Adkins and Dermot Mulroney were cast in the film.

The following month, Justin Furstenfeld, Amaury Nolasco, Donald Cerrone, Jaime King, JuJu Chan, and Erica Peeples were reported to be cast.

Principal photography took place in Santa Clarita, California in February 2022.

== Release ==
Lights Out was released in the United States by Quiver Distribution on February 16, 2024.

== Reception ==
On the review aggregator website Rotten Tomatoes, 35% of 17 critics' reviews are positive.
