= Amaury Nolasco =

Puerto Rican actor (born 1970)

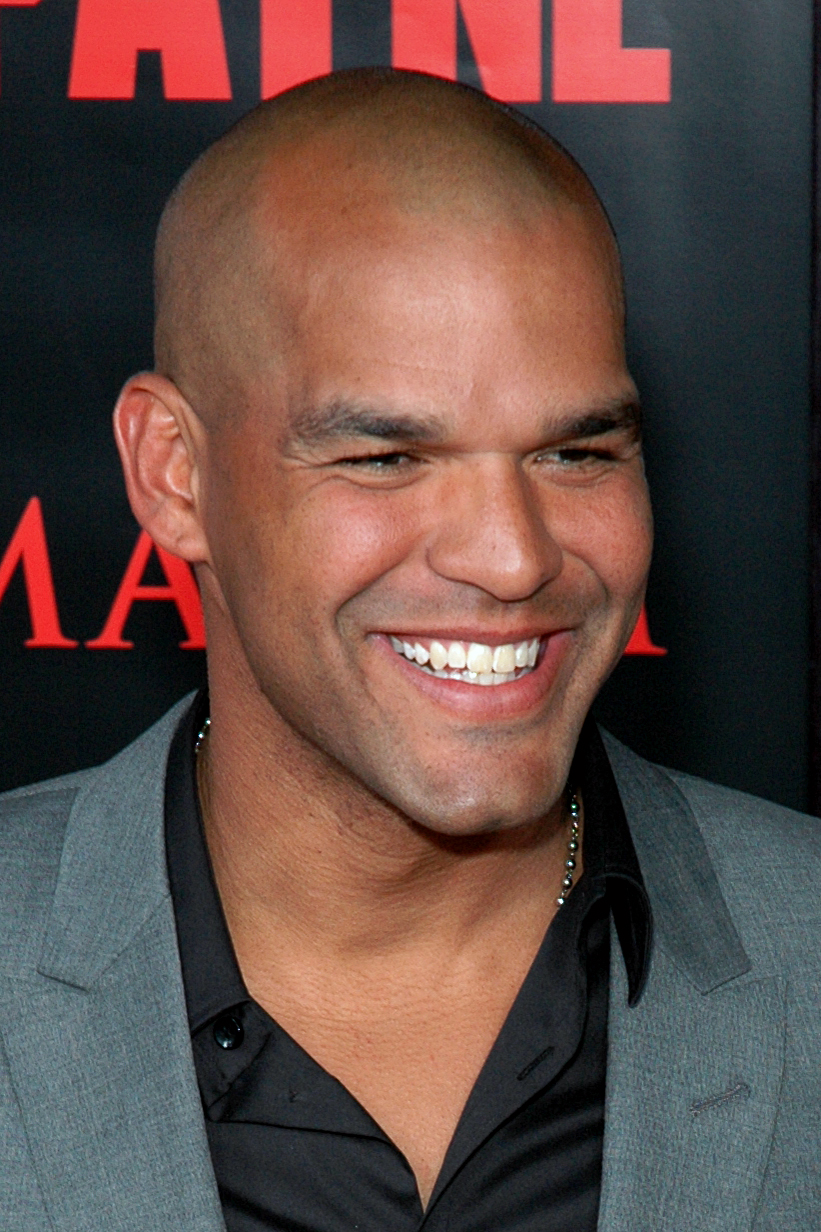
- Nolasco at the premiere of Max Payne in 2008
- Born: Amaury Nolasco Garrido; December 24, 1970 (age 55); San Juan, Puerto Rico
- Occupation: Actor
- Years active: 1996–present

Amaury Nolasco Garrido (born December 24, 1970) is a Puerto Rican actor. He is best known for the role of Fernando Sucre on the Fox television series Prison Break (2005–2009, 2017), and for his role in Transformers (2007).

== Early life ==
Nolasco was born in Vieques, Puerto Rico on Christmas Eve in 1970 to Dominican parents. After various acting gigs, Nolasco moved to New York City.

== Career ==
Nolasco has guest-starred in various television series such as Arli$$, CSI: Crime Scene Investigation, and ER. His first role on a feature film was in Takeshi Kitano's Brother, along others as "Orange Julius" in Universal's 2 Fast 2 Furious. He then went on to co-star opposite Bernie Mac in Mr. 3000.

Nolasco's additional television and film credits include roles on George Lopez and CSI: NY, and in The Benchwarmers. He also appeared on Mind of Mencia as a guest on Sunday, April 29, 2007. He also starred in Director Michael Bay's Transformers, released during the summer of 2007. Bay offered to cast Nolasco in the sequel Transformers: Revenge of the Fallen, but he declined due to scheduling conflicts. His most high-profile role was Prison Break.

In November 2009, Nolasco made an appearance in Wisin & Yandel's music video "Imagínate" featuring T-Pain alongside Wilmer Valderrama. He plays a jealous mobster who murders Valderrama's character for sleeping with his girlfriend. He also appears in Calle 13's music video "La Perla".

In March 2010, Nolasco guest-starred in three episodes during the second season of Southland, as Detective Rene Cordero.

From September 2010 to May 2011, he costarred in the NBC show Chase, a one-season show about U.S. Marshals that hunt down fugitives. He starred in the short-lived ABC television series Work It which premiered on January 3, 2012.

Nolasco was featured in the sitcom Telenovela, as Rodrigo Suarez, Ana Sofia's eccentric co-star who plays the show's villain.

== Personal life ==
Nolasco began dating Jennifer Morrison in 2009, and the relationship reportedly lasted three years.

He was a supporter of the presidential campaign of Barack Obama.

For the second year in a row, Nolasco was the host of the Amaury Nolasco & Friends Golf Classic that took place in El Conquistador Hotel in Fajardo, Puerto Rico from June 10–11, 2011. The Amaury Nolasco & Friends Golf Classic is a celebrity golf tournament, where all the profits go to non-profit Puerto Rican organizations. For the second season, the profits went to the University of Puerto Rico Pediatric Hospital and to the VAL Foundation (Vive Alegre Luchando), an organization that gives their funding to pediatric cancer patients.

== Filmography ==
=== Film ===
Year	Title	Role	Note
1997	Fall	Waiter	Uncredited
2000	Brother	Victor	
2002	Final Breakdown	Hector Arturo	
2003	2 Fast 2 Furious	Julius 'Orange Julius'	
2003	The Librarians	G-Man	
2004	Mr. 3000	Jorge Minadeo	
2006	The Benchwarmers	Carlos	
2007	Transformers	ACWO Jorge "Fig" Figueroa	
2008	Street Kings	Detective Cosmo Santos	
2008	Max Payne	Jack Lupino	
2009	Armored	Palmer	
2011	The Rum Diary	Segurra	
2013	A Good Day to Die Hard	Detective Murphy	
2013	El Teniente Amado	Amado García Guerrero	
2013	Out of the Blue	Savage	Short film
2014	In the Blood	Silvio Lugo	
2014	Small Time	Barlow	
2014	Animal	Douglas	
2015	2 Hours 2 Vegas	Damian Savage	Short film
2016	Criminal	Esteban Ruiza	
2016	Fate	Boss	Short film
2018	Locating Silver Lake	Jose	
2018	Edge of Fear	Nick	
2018	Speed Kills	Agent Lopez	
2019	Jarhead: Law of Return	Gunny Sergeant	Video
2021	South of Heaven	Manny	
2022	The Valet	Benny	
2024	Lights Out	Fosco	

=== Television ===
Year	Title	Role	Notes
1998	New York Undercover	Shadow's Accomplice #1	Episode: "Going Native"
1999	Arli$$	Ivory Ortega	Episode: "The Stories You Don't Hear About"
1999	Early Edition	Pedro Mendoza	Episode: "Take Me Out to the Ballgame"
2000	Pacific Blue		Episode: "A Thousand Words"
2000	The Huntress	Flaco Rosario	Episode: "Bad Boys & Why We Love Them"
2000	The Dukes of Hazzard: Hazzard in Hollywood	Cypriano	TV movie
2001	CSI: Crime Scene Investigation	Hector Delgado	Episode: "Slaves of Las Vegas"
2002	ER	Ricky	Episode: "Dead Again"
2003	George Lopez	Young Manny	Episode: "Long Time No See"
2004	Eve	Adrian	Episode: "Love TKO"
2005	CSI: NY	Ruben DeRosa	Episode: "The Closer"
2005–2009, 2017	Prison Break	Fernando Sucre	90 episodes
2007	Mind of Mencia	Club Carlos Guest	Episode: "Bouncin' at Club Carlos"
2009	CSI: Miami	Nathan Cole	Episode: "Bone Voyage"
2010	Southland	Detective Rene Cordero	3 episodes
2010	The Quickening	Swan	TV movie
2010–2011	Chase	Marco Martinez	18 episodes
2012–2013	Work It	Angel Ortiz	13 episodes
2013	Burn Notice	Mateo	Episode: "Things Unseen"
2013–2016	Rizzoli & Isles	Lt. Det. Rafael Martinez	Recurring cast: season 4, guest: season 6
2014	Justified	Elvis Manuel Machado	Episode: "A Murder of Crowes"
2014	Gang Related	Matias	5 episodes
2015–2016	Telenovela	Rodrigo Suarez	11 episodes
2018	Deception	FBI Agent Mike Alvarez	13 episodes
2019	Power	Rudolfo	Episode: "Like Father, Like Son"
2020–2024	Hightown	Frankie Cuevas Sr.	25 episodes
2022	9-1-1: Lone Star	Morris	Episode: "Riddle of the Sphynx"
2024	Land of Women	Kevin	Recurring cast

== Awards ==
Nolasco has been nominated three times for an ALMA Award, and once for a Teen Choice Award.

Year	Award	Nominated work	Result
2006	Teen Choice Award: TV - Choice Sidekick	Prison Break	Nominated
2006	ALMA Award: Outstanding Supporting Actor in a Television Series	Prison Break	Nominated
2008	ALMA Award: Outstanding Supporting Actor in a Drama Television Series	Prison Break	Nominated
2009	ALMA Award: Actor in Television - Drama	Prison Break	Nominated

== See also ==
- List of Afro-Latinos
- List of Puerto Ricans
