= This Christmas (2007 film) =

2007 American Christmas comedy film

- Theatrical release poster
- Directed by: Preston A. Whitmore II
- Written by: Preston A. Whitmore II
- Produced by: Preston A. Whitmore II; Will Packer
- Starring: Delroy Lindo; Idris Elba; Loretta Devine; Chris Brown; Columbus Short; Regina King; Keith Robinson; Laz Alonso; Sharon Leal; Lauren London; Mekhi Phifer
- Cinematography: Alexander Gruszynski
- Edited by: Paul Seydor
- Music by: Marcus Miller
- Production companies: Rainforest Films; Screen Gems
- Distributed by: Sony Pictures Releasing
- Release date: November 21, 2007
- Running time: 119 minutes
- Country: United States
- Language: English
- Budget: $13 million
- Box office: $49.8 million

This Christmas is a 2007 American Christmas comedy drama film produced by Rainforest Films and distributed by Screen Gems. The film was written and directed by Preston A. Whitmore II, who also produced it alongside Will Packer, and stars Delroy Lindo, Loretta Devine, Idris Elba, Regina King, Chris Brown and Mekhi Phifer. It centers on the Whitfield family, as they overcome many trials and obstacles during the Christmas season. The film is named after the 1970 Donny Hathaway song of the same name. The film was released theatrically on November 21, 2007.

== Plot ==
It is the holiday season, and the Whitfields are celebrating together. The matriarch, Shirley Ann "Ma'Dere" Whitfield (Loretta Devine), and her boyfriend, Joe (Delroy Lindo) were joined by her six children: eldest child, Quentin, Jr. (Idris Elba) a musician who is always on the go and has not been home in 4 years, much like their father (Shirley's ex-husband) who abandoned them; eldest daughter, Lisa (Regina King), a housewife, her cheating husband, Malcolm Moore (Laz Alonso) and their two kids Tori & Keshon; Kelli (Sharon Leal), a Harvard grad visiting from New York; Claude (Columbus Short), a U.S. Marine; baby girl, Melanie "Mel" (Lauren London), seven-year college student accompanied by her boyfriend, Devan (Keith Robinson); and the youngest of the bunch, Michael "Baby" (Chris Brown), a photographer and aspiring musician.

It is Christmas Eve, and everyone is starting to arrive for dinner at 6:00. Problems arise soon after Malcolm prompts Lisa to suggest that they should all give up their share of their family-owned dry cleaners. Everyone else is against it, and an argument breaks out between Lisa and Kelli as a result.

Soon after, Quentin arrives and talks to his family at the dinner table; upon seeing Joe, he becomes cold and rude towards him. In the kitchen, Mel informs Devan about Ma'Dere's ex-husband, "Senior", who left the family to pursue a musical career. Quentin finds Joe and threatens him again. When Joe leaves, Quentin plays Senior's piano in the garage. Claude attempts to sneak off to a club, causing Kelli, Quentin, and Mel to join him. They witness Baby singing "Try a Little Tenderness" there, and the family is astonished to find out he can sing. Kelli and Gerald (Mekhi Phifer), an old school friend of Quentin’s, meet and are instantly attracted. Claude loses his temper with two men who attempt to hit on his (unbeknownst to the rest of the family) wife, Sandi (Jessica Stroup), and he pulls his gun out at the club, causing the Whitfields to flee.

Baby convinces his siblings to keep his singing talent a secret at the house until he confronts Ma'Dere himself. The next day, the men look for a Christmas tree. Meanwhile, Kelli, Lisa, and Mel wrap presents, and Kelli confesses that she has slept with Gerald. Mel encourages Kelli to enjoy her fling, while Lisa chides her for being reckless. At the airport, Lisa becomes suspicious of Malcolm, who has to leave because of issues at his "job." Lisa comes home with Mo and Dude, two bookies Quentin owes money. They attempt to beat him until he tells them that a police car is nearby.

Claude gets arrested, and Lisa and Quentin go to the station to fix the situation. Ma'Dere scolds the family for not cooking dinner or getting prepared for Christmas. When Lisa and Quentin return, they tell everyone that Claude is AWOL, and the family is shocked to meet Sandi, who is revealed to be Claude's wife. Mo and Dude take advantage of Quentin by eating with his family. Sandi privately explains to Mel why Claude is AWOL and eventually admits she is pregnant. Meanwhile, Quentin confronts Ma'Dere about her relationship with Joe and why no one told him she and Senior were divorced.

Outside, Kelli talks to Lisa about the events that took place, and Lisa also tells her that even though she did not get a college degree, she had to help their mom with the dry-cleaning business when Kelli went to Harvard. Kelli admits that Malcolm is cheating; Lisa confesses that she already knows. Kelli says that "sharing her man with another woman is pathetic," leading to a fight between Lisa and Kelli in the rain. When Mel breaks up the fight, she tells Kelli about Sandi's pregnancy and that Claude does not know about it. In the meantime, Lisa angrily totals Malcolm's car when she drives it into the Los Angeles River. Gerald arrives and spends the night with Kelli. Baby gives Quentin a scrapbook of Christmas pictures before he leaves. Baby finally confesses to Ma'Dere that he wants to be a singer, but she refuses to listen.

Quentin goes to the train station but gets ambushed by Mo and Dude; Joe shows up to defend him. Joe gives the bookies $10,000 to get them to leave Quentin alone, and they do. Despite Joe's pleas, Quentin boards his train. The following day, Kelli asks Gerald to visit her in New York. Malcolm returns, and Lisa decides to do something about his cheating. She persuades him to shower while covering the floor in baby oil. When he asks about his truck, Lisa confronts him about his infidelity, lures him out of the shower onto the slippery floor, and beats him repeatedly with a belt. Afterward, she meets Kelli on the porch before church and tells her that he left and that she is filing for a divorce and starting over.

At church, Baby sings "This Christmas", and Claude arrives after being released. After the church service, Quentin returns and reconciles with Joe and his family.

== Cast ==
- Loretta Devine as Shirley Ann "Ma'Dere" Whitfield
- Delroy Lindo as Joe Black, Shirley's boyfriend
- Idris Elba as Quentin Whitfield, Jr., Shirley's oldest son
- Regina King as Lisa Whitfield-Moore, Shirley's oldest daughter
- Sharon Leal as Kelli Whitfield, Shirley's middle daughter
- Columbus Short as Claude Whitfield, Shirley's middle son
- Lauren London as Melanie Whitfield, Shirley's youngest daughter
- Chris Brown as Michael "Baby" Whitfield, Shirley's youngest son
- Laz Alonso as Malcolm Moore, Lisa's husband
- Jessica Stroup as Sandi Whitfield, Claude's wife
- Keith Robinson as Devan Brooks, Melanie's boyfriend
- Mekhi Phifer as Gerald
- Lupe Ontiveros as Rosie
- David Banner as Mo
- Ricky Harris as Cousin Fred Whitfield
- Ronnie Warner as Dude
- Ambrosia Kelley as Tori Moore, Lisa & Malcolm's daughter
- Javion Francis as Keshon Moore, Lisa & Malcolm's son
- Amy Hunter as Karen

== Reception ==
This Christmas received mixed reviews from critics and audiences. On review aggregator Rotten Tomatoes, the film holds an approval rating of 56% based on 82 reviews, with an average rating of 5.9/10. The website's critics' consensus reads: "This Christmas features strong performances and a sharp portrayal of family dynamics, but relies too heavily on holiday movie clichés." On Metacritic, the film has a weighted average score of 63 out of 100, based on 24 critics, indicating "generally favorable reviews".

Roger Ebert gave this a film a rate of three stars out of four, describing that the movie is "sort of screwball-comedy effect, but with a heart." He also praised the cast and the plot points of the movie. The Guardian rated the film two stars out of five, calling it "formulaic and corny as hell, but a top-notch cast keeps this festive family drama believable - just." Cynthia Fuchs of Common Sense Media rated three stars out of five, stating that "while the film makes familial grappling look mostly comic, occasional tensions erupt into full-on fights." She also said that the film's moments are "less engaging than the film's subtler moments, and mostly just repeat the home-for-the-holidays movie formula." Roger Moore of Times Herald-Record reviewed the film and described it as "a warm and warmed-over collection of holiday-movie clichés packaged in a movie about a large extended black family." He noted that the film's moments are "charming", but the pacing "just kills [it]." He also remarks that the film is "a Tyler Perry comedy without the sassy snap, "The Cosby Show" without Bill — which is another way of saying that, novel as the race of the characters is, there's nothing new under this tree 'This Christmas.'"

Nick Schager of Slant Magazine wrote the film about the director "focuses on the spirituality of saying pre-meal grace and the ensuing, chatter-filled feasts, instances that exude a genuineness that's otherwise sorely lacking from this overstuffed grab bag of conflicts and romantic affairs." He said that director "spends virtually every available second entangling his pleasant but rather clichéd characters in—and then extricating them from—quandaries." He also noted that the film's plot have "better served with fewer narrative threads and far more inventiveness." He wrote off "applies to the amiable proceedings as a whole, since the writer-director is ultimately more interested in dishing out unadventurous, heartwarming mush than anything that might qualify as challenging, unexpected, or even boisterous." He gave the rate of a film two stars out of four. Kenya Vaughn of The St. Louis American wrote in his review. He criticized the film's director for its "predictable and sloppy storyline and choppy direction, […] will prevent the film from being ranked among Soul Food and The Color Purple as a 'black family classic' movie." He also complains that the film's cast is in the "midst of a crisis," which is a "far cry from the strong and sassy roles" like Regina King plays "a docile and easily influenced housewife willing to jeopardize the family business to save her marriage." He did note that as "Chris Brown makes his first attempt to transfer his heartthrob status from music to film, most of the cast […] give noteworthy performances in This Christmas." He concluded that the film is a "feel-good dramedy with better intentions than execution to an outstanding cinematic effort that portrays a slice of African-American life for the archives."

Emily Phillips of Empire writes that the "writer-director Whitmore II unites a busy ensemble cast from Delroy Lindo to R&B star Chris Brown, and then lands them with the sort of seasonal family friction we all love to hate. With its made-for-TV plot twists, it's the film equivalent of the macaroni and cheese matriarch Ma Dear prepares for her offspring - comfort food that's not good for you." IGN's James Musgrove, in his review of the movie's DVD release, calling it a "'feel good' kind of movie." He noted the film's "a large and likable cast of characters permeates this film and allows it to rise above the 'let's fight and come together on Christmas day' formula of this and nearly every other Christmas-themed special or movie ever made." He gave a scored eight out of ten. Josh Rosenblatt of The Austin Chronicle rated the film two stars out of five, saying that the actors, Lindo and Elba, "were bound by contractual obligation to take whatever part executives threw at them in fits of dyspepsia," and "they're starring together in a glorified TV movie about an estranged family reuniting after four years to discover the true meaning of Christmas." He also calls it "redemption through sentimentality, salvation through schmaltz."

The film opened the box office at number two behind Enchanted. The film became a box office hit after opening with $17,958,183. It went on to gross $49,121,934 domestically on a budget of just $13 million and thus became a box office success.

=== Awards and nominations ===
- Asian Excellence Awards
  - Outstanding Actress in a Movie: (Sharon Leal), Winner
- Image Awards
  - Outstanding Supporting Actress in a Motion Picture: (Loretta Devine), Nominated
  - Outstanding Directing in a Motion Picture: (Preston A Whitmore II), Nominated
- MTV Movie Awards
  - Breakthrough Performance: (Chris Brown), Nominated

== Release ==
This Christmas was released on DVD and Blu-ray Disc on November 11, 2008.

== Soundtrack ==
The This Christmas soundtrack was released by Jive Records on November 20, 2007.

1. This Christmas - Chris Brown - 3:18
2. I'll Be Home for Christmas (Waiting On Remix) - Jordin Sparks - 3:13
3. Jingle Bells - B2K - 3:18
4. Try a Little Tenderness - Chris Brown - 6:14
5. Merry Christmas Baby - Charles Brown - 4:49
6. Silent Night - Boney James Feat. Anthony Hamilton - 5:16
7. Please Come Home for Christmas - Aaron Neville - 2:52
8. I Never Loved a Man (The Way I Love You) - Aretha Franklin - 2:50
9. Got to Give It Up, Part 1 - Marvin Gaye - 4:13
10. Have Yourself a Merry Little Christmas - Luther Vandross - 5:05
11. The Christmas Song - Toni Braxton - 3:25
12. Santa Baby - Lina - 3:20
13. Sleigh Ride - TLC - 3:44
14. O Holy Night - Denetria Champ - 4:33

== See also ==
- List of Christmas films
