= Blood Crime =

2002 American television film

- DVD Cover
- Written by: Mark Lawrence Miller and Preston A. Whitmore II
- Directed by: William A. Graham
- Starring: James Caan; Johnathon Schaech; Elizabeth Lackey; David Field; Sydney Jackson
- Music by: Chris Boardman
- Country of origin: United States
- Original language: English

Production
- Producer: Preston A. Whitmore II
- Cinematography: Robert Steadman
- Editor: Drake Silliman
- Running time: 88 minutes
- Production companies: Columbia TriStar Domestic Television; Mandalay Television

Original release
- Network: USA Network
- Release: September 13, 2002

Blood Crime is a 2002 American made-for-television thriller film, starring James Caan and Johnathon Schaech. It was co-written and co-produced by Preston A. Whitmore II and directed by William A. Graham. The film was first aired at USA Network on September 13, 2002. It was Graham's final film before his death in 2013.

== Plot ==
A homicide detective has problems with a local sheriff, after pummeling a man who supposedly attacked his wife while they were on vacation at the sheriff’s small town.

== Cast ==
- James Caan as Sheriff Morgan McKenna
- Johnathon Schaech as Daniel Pruitt
- Elizabeth Lackey as Jessica Pruitt
- David Field as Jonah Ganz
- Sydney Jackson as Roy Biggs
- Kevin J. Wilson as Smitty
- John Atkinson as Redmond Sawyer

== Reception ==
Frank Veenstra from the blog "BobaFett1138" gave the film 4 out 10 and wrote: ""Blood Crime" has a bad written script. Well, perhaps bad is not the most correct word to use since the story is more just a highly unlikely one. You just never get sucked into it because it all and the way the story progresses seem so highly unlikely. You can say that I even was a bit annoyed by the movie its story at times. It isn't credible and has some gaping plot-holes." Scott Weinberg from "eFilm Critic" gave the movie only two stars, stating: "Blood Crime is an interesting movie, if only in one very specific and silly way: it pairs one legendary actor who really ought to know better (James Caan) with one chiseled B-level actor who not too long ago was considered a 'next big thing'." Robert Pardi from TV Guide gave "Blood Crime" two out four stars and wrote: "If Mark Lawrence Miller and Preston A. Whitmore's screenplay had focused more subtly on the wary relationship that evolves between the urban and rural lawmen, this would be a far more compelling film. As it stands, there are exciting sequences but the film overall is undermined by a protagonist whose decision to tamper with clues strains credulity."
