= Woman Thou Art Loosed: On the 7th Day =

- Theatrical release poster
- Directed by: Neema Barnette
- Written by: Cory Tynan
- Story by: Cory Tynan; T. D. Jakes
- Produced by: Neema Barnette; Jeff Clanagan; Nina Henderson Moore; Quincy Newell; Gary Reeves; Blair Underwood
- Starring: Blair Underwood; Sharon Leal; Nicole Beharie; Pam Grier
- Cinematography: Keith L. Smith
- Edited by: David Beatty
- Music by: Mark Kilian
- Production companies: TDJ Enterprises; New Dimensions Entertainment
- Distributed by: Codeblack Films
- Release date: April 13, 2012
- Running time: 101 minutes
- Country: United States
- Language: English

Woman Thou Art Loosed: On the 7th Day is a 2012 American drama film directed by Neema Barnette and starring Blair Underwood, Sharon Leal, Nicole Beharie Clyde R Jones, and Pam Grier. It is the sequel to the 2004 film Woman Thou Art Loosed.

== Plot ==
David and Kari Ames enjoy a seemingly idyllic life until their six-year-old daughter, Mikayla, disappears. As the search intensifies over the week that follows, long-concealed secrets beneath the surface of their seemingly perfect facade emerge, endangering their marriage and their family.

== Cast ==
- Blair Underwood as David Ames
- Sharon Leal as Kari Ames
- Nicole Beharie as Beth Hutchins
- T. D. Jakes as himself
- Nicoye Banks as Wil Bennet
- Jaqueline Fleming as Tia
- Reed R. McCants as Les
- Zoe Carter as Mikayla Ames
- Samantha Beaulieu as Pam
- Tim Francis as Wayne
- Patrick Weathers as Remy
- Clyde R Jones, as Lemont
- Pam Grier as Detective Barrick

== Production ==
The film was shot in New Orleans.

== Reception ==
The film has a 20% rating on Rotten Tomatoes. On Metacritic, the film has a score of 29 out of 100 based on 4 critics, indicating "generally unfavorable reviews". Wesley Morris of The Boston Globe gave the film a negative review and wrote that "this overplotted, underwritten, powerfully dumb soap-thriller has more professionalism than it deserves." Justin Chang of Variety also gave the film a negative review, calling it "hysterically overwrought".
