= Here We Go Again (2016 TV series) =

Television series

- Genre: Comedy
- Starring: LeToya Luckett; Andra Fuller; Shauna Brooks; Kyndall Ferguson; Monique Coleman; Travis Winfrey; Wendy Raquel Robinson
- Composer: Kurt Farquhar
- Country of origin: United States
- Original language: English
- No. of seasons: 1
- No. of episodes: 8

Production
- Executive producers: LeToya Luckett; Andra Fuller; Eric Tomosunas; Karen Peterkin; Meg DeLoatch
- Running time: 30 minutes
- Production companies: Swirl Films; Mega Diva Inc. Nina Holiday Entertainment

Original release
- Network: TV One
- Release: February 5 – March 22, 2016

Here We Go Again is an American sitcom series starring LeToya Luckett and Wendy Raquel Robinson, that debuted on TV One on February 5, 2016. A sneak preview was aired after the 47th NAACP Image Awards on February 5, 2016.

== Summary ==
Here We Go Again follows three generations of Walker women: Loretta (Wendy Raquel Robinson), who became a mother at the age of 16, and her daughter Maddy (LeToya Luckett) who also gave birth to her daughter Shante (Kyndall Ferguson) at age 16.

== Cast ==
- Wendy Raquel Robinson as Loretta
- Andra Fuller as Victor
- LeToya Luckett as Maddy Walker
- Travis Winfrey as Cedric
- Kyndall Ferguson as Shante Walker
- Robert Crayton as Bartender

== Episodes ==
No.	Title	Directed by	Written by	Original release date	US viewers (millions)
1	"The Curse"	Unknown	Unknown	February 5, 2016	N/A
2	"A Pregnant Pause"	Unknown	Unknown	February 9, 2016	N/A
3	"Second Time Around"	Unknown	Unknown	February 16, 2016	N/A
4	"50/50"	Unknown	Unknown	February 23, 2016	N/A
5	"A Moving Story"	Unknown	Unknown	March 1, 2016	N/A
6	"She's Back"	Unknown	Unknown	March 8, 2016	N/A
7	"High School Deja Vu"	Unknown	Unknown	March 15, 2016	N/A
8	"When Positive is Negative"	Unknown	Unknown	March 22, 2016	N/A
