= True to the Game (film) =

- Directed by: Preston A. Whitmore II
- Screenplay by: Nia Hill
- Based on: True to the Game by Teri Woods
- Produced by: Columbus Short; Andra Fuller; Nelsan Ellis; Manny Halley; Erica Peeples; Jamaar Simon; Darell Johnson; Quincy Saumel Smith; Rodney Turner II; Vivica A. Fox
- Starring: Columbus Short; Andra Fuller; Vivica A. Fox; Nelsan Ellis; Draya Michele; Nafessa Williams; Jennifer Freeman; Annika Noelle; Iyana Halley; Jamaar Simon; Erica Peeples; Starletta DuPois; Nikki Leigh; Misan Akuya; Lorenzo Eduardo; George Arvaitdis
- Edited by: Andre Jones
- Production company: Imani Films
- Distributed by: Faith Media Distribution
- Release date: September 8, 2017
- Running time: 108 minutes
- Country: United States
- Language: English
- Box office: $1,231,040

True to the Game is a 2017 American romantic crime drama film directed by Preston A. Whitmore II, written by Nia Hill, and starring Columbus Short, Andra Fuller, Vivica A. Fox, Nelsan Ellis, and Jennifer Freeman. It is based on Teri Woods's novel of the same name and follows Quadir Richards (Short), a charismatic drug lord who tries to start a new life after he falls in love with Gena Rollins (Peeples), a young woman from Philadelphia.

The film was released on September 8, 2017 by Faith Media Distribution. A 2020 sequel named True to the Game 2: Gena's Story was released on November 6, 2020. A second sequel, True to the Game 3, was released in December 3, 2021.

== Cast ==
- Columbus Short as Quadir Richards
- Erica Peeples as Gena Rollins
- Draya Michele as Cherelle
- Vivica A. Fox as Shoog
- Nelsan Ellis as Tyrik
- Andra Fuller as Jerrell Jackson
- Jennifer Freeman as Lita
- Nafessa Williams as Sahirah
- Jamaar Simon as Rasun
- Iyana Halley as Bria
- Annika Noelle as Aubrey
- Misan Akuya as Drug Dealer
- Starletta DuPois as Gah-Git
- George Arvanitdis as Club Patron
- Lorenzo Eduardo as Winston
- Nikki Leigh as Megan
- Rotimi as Vaughn
- Jeremy Meeks as Saleem
- Lil Mama as Alia
- Faith Evans as herself
- Darius McCrary as Detective Joe
- Lisa Renee Pitts as Viola Richards
- Tamar Braxton as Ariana
- Bre-Z as Taj
- Omar Gooding as Nino

== Production ==
It was reported that a film adaptation of Teri Woods' novel True to the Game would go ahead in December 2015. Columbus Short was reported to have signed on for the lead role on September 17, 2015. The rest of the main cast was announced on October 13, 2015, including Vivica A. Fox, Nelsan Ellis, Andra Fuller. Principal photography began for the film in October 2015 in Los Angeles, California and finished in April 2016. This would be Nelsan Ellis' final film role before his death two months prior to the film's release. The film was dedicated to his memory.

== Soundtrack ==
True to the Game : Music Features By Keyshia Cole, 21 Savage, Big Block, Kris Kelli and Young Scooter, In 2017—18.

== Reception ==
The first film received mixed to negative reviews from critics.

Teo Bugbee from The New York Times gave it a negative review writing: "In the best circumstances, the familiarity of the crime genre can provide an opportunity for a filmmaker to flex their point of view, but the direction, by Preston A. Whitmore II, seems hampered by either a lack of resources or a lack of interest. The camera lingers on expensive cars, but club scenes appear threadbare.Among the actors, Vivica A. Fox commands a cameo appearance with an authority and charisma that outweighs any of the movie’s leads — including Mr. Short’s Quadir. And Nelsan Ellis, in one of his last film roles, is underutilized as Quadir’s cutthroat second-in-command."

== Trilogy ==
- The sequel named True to the Game 2: Gena's Story was released in limited theaters on November 6, 2020.
- A third final installment named True to the Game 3 was released in limited theaters on December 3, 2021.

== Spin offs ==
Main article: True to the Game: Quadir's Redemption
Is officially set to premiere on Tuesday, December 15, 2026, exclusively on Paramount+.

Main article: True to the Game
television series coming soon.
