= Sharon Leal =

American actress and singer

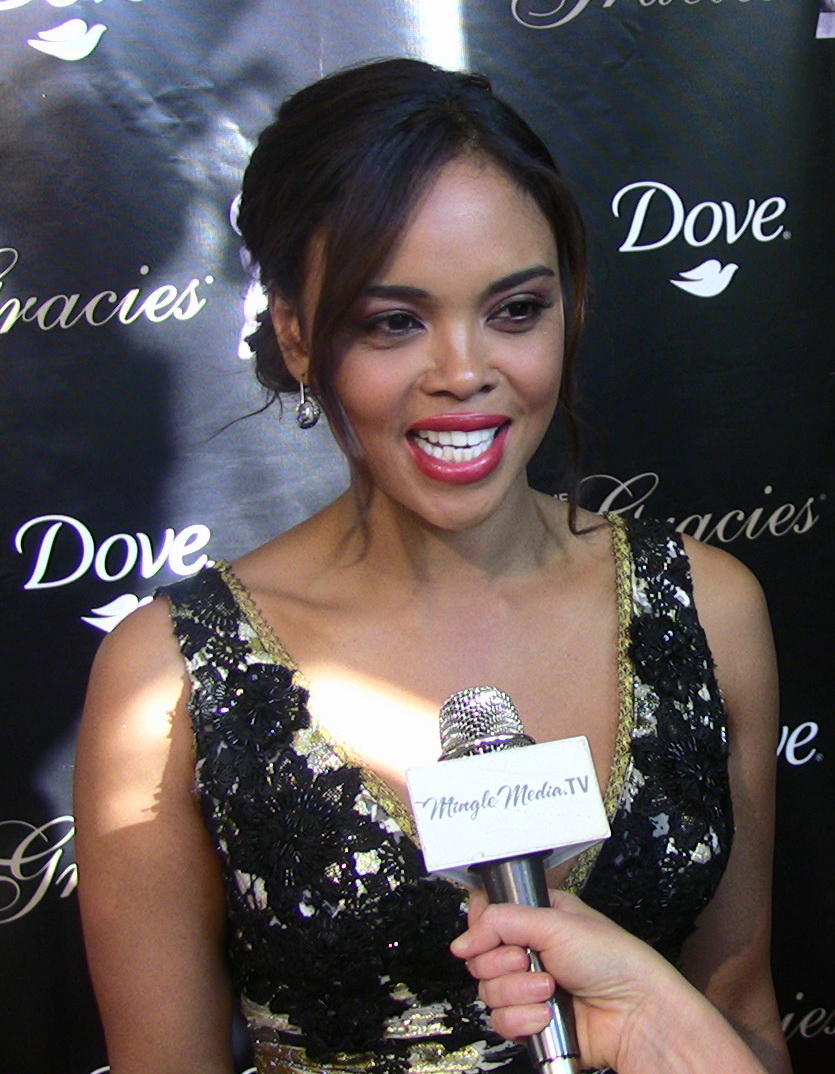
- Leal at the 36th Annual Gracie Awards Gala in 2011
- Born: October 17, 1972 (age 54); Tucson, Arizona, U.S.
- Occupations: Actress, singer
- Years active: 1996–present
- Spouse: Bev Land (m. 2001; div. 2009)
- Children: 1

Sharon Leal (born October 17, 1972), is an American actress and singer. She is known for her roles in movies such as Dreamgirls (2006), This Christmas (2007), Why Did I Get Married? (2007), Why Did I Get Married Too? (2010) and her roles on the television shows Legacy, Guiding Light and Boston Public.

== Early life ==
Leal was born in Tucson, Arizona. Her mother, Angelita, is Filipino. Her father was an African-American military policeman who broke up with her mother before Sharon was born. Shortly after, her mother married Jesse Leal, a master sergeant in the United States Air Force and a police officer at Clark Air Base, Philippines; he legally adopted Sharon.

== Career ==
Leal's career began with the role of Dahlia Crede in the CBS daytime serial Guiding Light. Later, she joined the Broadway company of Rent. Soon after, she was cast as Mimi for the San Francisco leg of the first national tour of Rent. Leal appeared on the 1999 original cast recording of the Off-Broadway musical Bright Lights, Big City alongside Patrick Wilson and Jesse L. Martin. She also appeared on the 2001 cast recording of Making Tracks.

From 2000 to 2004, Leal starred in the Fox prime time TV series Boston Public. She also had a role in the theatrical release Face the Music. She then appeared in a recurring role in the short-lived NBC series LAX, as the wife of airport co-director, Roger de Souza.

In 2006, she co-starred in the film adaptation of the Broadway musical Dreamgirls as Michelle Morris, Effie White's replacement in the pop group The Dreams, with Beyoncé Knowles, Jennifer Hudson, Eddie Murphy and Jamie Foxx. In 2007, Leal was cast in the Tyler Perry production Why Did I Get Married? and This Christmas. In 2010, she starred in Perry's sequel production Why Did I Get Married Too?. She also portrayed the character Vanessa Lodge in the series Hellcats, until it was cancelled in 2011. In 2013, Leal played the supporting role in the movie 1982, which tells a story of a drug addicted mother and a father's fight to protect his daughter.

In 2014, Leal released her album "Leal".

Leal appears in seasons 2, 3, 5 and 6 of Supergirl as M'gann M'orzz (Megan in human form).

== Personal life ==
In October 2001, Leal married Bev Land. Their son was born in September 2001. The couple divorced in 2009. Former Guiding Light co-star Yvonna Wright has said that she and Leal are close friends; the two starred together in a community production of Dreamgirls in their hometown.

In 2009, she posed nude for the May issue of Allure magazine.

== Filmography ==
=== Film ===
Year	Title	Role	Notes
2001	Face the Music	Tracie	
2004	What Are the Odds	Nikki	Short
2006	Dreamgirls	Michelle Morris	
2007	Motives 2	Nina	Video
2007	Why Did I Get Married?	Dianne Brock	
2007	This Christmas	Kelli Whitfield	
2008	Linewatch	Angela Dixon	
2008	Soul Men	Cleo Whitfield	
2009	Limelight	Nina	TV movie
2010	Why Did I Get Married Too?	Dianne Brock	
2011	Little Murder	Jennifer	
2012	Woman Thou Art Loosed: On the 7th Day	Kari Ames	
2013	1982	Shenae Brown	
2013	The Last Letter	Cathrine Wright	
2013	Guilty	Sara Weston	TV movie
2014	Freedom	Vanessa	
2014	Addicted	Zoe Reynard	
2015	White Water	Annie	TV movie
2016	36 Hour Layover	Sofia	
2017	Shot	Phoebe	
2018	Amateur	Nia	
2018	Bella's Story	Kim	
2019	Paper Friends	London	
2020	Blindfire	Nika Wilkins	
2021	A Holiday Chance	Naomi Chance	
2021	Traces	Claudia	
2026	Why Did I Get Married Again?	Dianne Brock	

=== Television ===
Year	Title	Role	Notes
1996–99	Guiding Light	Dahlia Crede	Regular Cast
1998–99	Legacy	Marita Peters	Main cast
2000–04	Boston Public	Marilyn Sudor	Main cast
2004–05	LAX	Monique DeSouza	Recurring cast
2005	Las Vegas	Nina	Episode: "Sperm Whales and Spearmint Rhinos"
2007	CSI: Miami	Lauren Sloan	Episode: "Internal Affairs"
2009	Private Practice	Dr. Sonya Nichols	Recurring cast: Season 2
2010–11	Hellcats	Vanessa Lodge	Main cast
2011	Suits	Lisa Parker	Episode: "Dirty Little Secrets"
2012	Person of Interest	Dr. Madeleine Enright	Episode: "Critical"
2014	Perception	Inspector Liza Brahms	Episode: "Obsession"
2014	Suits	Lisa Parker	Episode: "Yesterday's Gone"
2015	The Good Wife	Nicole Rickter	Episode: "Wanna Partner?"
2015	Reed Between the Lines	Lori Samuels	Recurring cast: season 2
2014–16	Grimm	Tyler "Zuri" Ellis	Recurring cast: Season 3 & 5
2016	Recovery Road	Charlotte Graham	Main cast
2016	Dead of Summer	Renee Tyler	Episode: "The Devil Inside" & "She Talks to Angels"
2016–21	Supergirl	M'gann M'orzz/Miss Martian	Recurring cast: Season 2 & 6, guest: Season 3 & 5
2018–19	Instinct	Lt. Jasmine Gooden	Main cast
2018–19	The Good Doctor	Breeze Browne	Guest: season 1-2, recurring cast: season 3
2020	Council of Dads	Michelle	Recurring cast
2022–24	Pretty Little Liars	Sidney Haworthe	Main cast
2026	NCIS: New York	Tamara	Guest Star

== Awards and nominations ==
Year	Nominated work	Award	Category	Result	Ref.
2007	Dreamgirls	Asian Excellence Awards	Asian Excellence Award for Outstanding Film Supporting Actress	Nominated	
2007	Dreamgirls	Broadcast Film Critics Association Award for Best Cast	Broadcast Film Critics Association Award for Best Acting Ensemble	Nominated	
2007	Dreamgirls	Screen Actors Guild Awards	Screen Actors Guild Award for Outstanding Performance by a Cast in a Motion Picture	Nominated	
2008	This Christmas	Asian Excellence Awards	Asian Excellence Award for Outstanding Film Actress	Nominated	
