= Ronnie Warner =

American actor

- Born: November 14, 1965 (age 59)
- Occupation(s): Actor, director, producer, writer, comedian
- Years active: 1989–present
- Children: 1

Ronnie Warner is an American actor, writer, producer and director. He is best known for his roles as Rico in the stoner comedy Puff, Puff, Pass and the gangster, Dude, in This Christmas.

== Early life ==
Warner grew up in Hillsborough, North Carolina, where he was raised by his grandparents. At the age of 13, he moved to Reston, Virginia, with his mother.

== Career ==
After leaving the United States Marine Corps, he worked as a waiter in a local comedy club in North Carolina, which he bought a year later. He brought Martin Lawrence to town and opened up a show with Ken Jeong, who was then a med school student.

Warner eventually earned televised spots on BET's ComicView and Showtime at the Apollo. In 1999, he moved to Los Angeles and landed acting gigs on shows such as The Shield, Joan of Arcadia and Threshold, in addition to minor writing assignments for BET.

In 2006, Warner collaborated with actor Mekhi Phifer and penned the script for Puff, Puff, Pass, in which both Warner and Phifer starred. Warner then formed the company Facilitator Films, with Phifer; it produced two other films under its banner, including This Christmas which grossed about US$50 million at the box office. The company then signed a developmental deal with Warner Bros, a deal with Universal Studios for a television pilot and a project with Overture Films.

Warner started Warner Lane Pictures in 2011, and made his directorial debut shortly after with the film The Love Section. In 2017, Warner established Tribal Icon Entertainment, a production company that is also involved with global distribution of small and mid-sized budget films and documentaries. Through the company, Warner signed a deal with the Global Genesis Group to distribute projects across 75 international territories.

== Personal life ==
Warner at a physique competition

Warner is a fitness enthusiast and occasionally participates in physique competitions. He is also a certified motorcycle mechanic who works on his muscle car and motorcycle collection.

== Filmography ==
Year	Title	Role	Notes
2001	Murder in Small Town X	Sunset Club owner Drew Chambers	
2003	Rock Me Baby	Movie Patron #2	
2004	Joan of Arcadia	Street guitarist/God	
2005	The Shield	Terrence	
2005	Cuts	Bruce	
2005	Threshold	Tazz	
2006	Puff, Puff, Pass	Rico	Also writer, producer
2007	This Christmas	Dude	Also executive producer
2007	Grindin'	Unemployment rep	
2008	Nora's Hair Salon 2: A Cut Above	Producer #2	Also producer
2013	The Love Section	Peewee	Also director, producer
2015	American Bad Boy	Pump	
2015	Reconcilable Differences	Sebastian Sterling	Also director, producer
