= Asian Excellence Awards =

The Asian Excellence Awards was an annual celebration of the outstanding achievements of Asians and Asian Americans in film, television, music, and the performing arts. The Asian Excellence Awards is the only nationally televised event celebrating significant Asian and Asian American achievements in entertainment and the arts. The 2008 Asian Excellence Awards, hosted by Carrie Ann Inaba and Bobby Lee, were held at the UCLA Royce Hall and nationally televised on E! Entertainment on May 1, 2008. The show was also available on Comcast On Demand throughout the month of May in honor of Asian Pacific American Heritage Month.

The 2008 Asian Excellence Awards were highlighted with live performances by America's Best Dance Crew winners and runners up the Jabbawockeez and Kaba Modern and singer/actress Tia Carrere. There were also special awards presentations to honorees Steve Chen, the founder of YouTube, and Olympic Gold Medalist Kristi Yamaguchi.

== History ==
Welly Yang, the creator and one of the executive producers of the Asian Excellence Awards, is an actor, singer, producer and founder of the Asian theatrical group Second Generation, which produced the earlier version of the Asian Excellence Awards known as The Concert of Excellence.

== Past awards ==
=== 2007 ===
The 2007 Asian Excellence Awards was hosted by Lost star Daniel Dae Kim and Grace Park. The 2007 Asian Excellence Awards featured a presentation of The Lifetime Achievement Award that was presented to Chow Yun-fat. Live comedy performances included Russell Peters, Margaret Cho and Dat Phan. The 2007 show was the first to feature a viewer’s choice award, and the winner was Survivor winner Yul Kwon.

=== 2006 ===
The 2006 Asian Excellence Awards featured the Rémy Martin X.O. Honors, which included an award to AIDS researcher Dr. David Ho for the Inspiration Honor and to writer/director Quentin Tarantino for the Bridge Honor. Live performances during the show included Fort Minor, featuring Mike Shinoda of Linkin Park, the original cast of the Broadway musical Lennon and Cirque du Soleil show KÀ. Kelly Hu and Bobby Lee were hosts of the show.

Both the 2006 and 2007 Asian Excellence Awards aired on AZN Television.

== Award categories ==
=== Television ===
- Outstanding Television Actress
- Outstanding Television Actor
- Supporting Television Actress
- Supporting Television Actor

=== Film ===
- Outstanding Film Actress
- Outstanding Film Actor
- Supporting Film Actress
- Supporting Film Actor
- Outstanding Film

== Winners ==
=== 2008 ===
- Outstanding Television Actress: Lindsay Price, Lipstick Jungle
- Outstanding Television Actor: BD Wong, Law & Order: Special Victims Unit
- Supporting Television Actress: Sonja Sohn, The Wire
- Supporting Television Actor: Rex Lee, Entourage
- Outstanding Film Actress: Sharon Leal, This Christmas
- Outstanding Film Actor: Tony Leung, Lust, Caution
- Outstanding Film: Lust, Caution

Honorees

- Pioneer Award: Steve Chen, Co-Founder of YouTube
- Inspiration Award: Kristi Yamaguchi, Olympic figure skating gold medalist
- Half Asian Award: Rob Schneider, actor-comedian

Viewer's Choice

- Favorite TV Personality: Cheryl Burke, Dancing with the Stars
- Favorite Reality Star: Jabbawockeez, America's Best Dance Crew

=== 2007 ===
- Outstanding Television Actress: Parminder Nagra, ER
- Outstanding Television Actor: Masi Oka, Heroes
- Supporting Television Actress: Mindy Kaling, The Office
- Supporting Television Actor: Rex Lee, Entourage
- Outstanding Film Actress: Rinko Kikuchi, Babel
- Outstanding Film Actor: Kal Penn, The Namesake
- Supporting Film Actress: Maggie Q, Mission: Impossible III
- Supporting Film Actor: Dustin Nguyen, Little Fish
- Outstanding Film: Letters from Iwo Jima
- Outstanding Independent Film: Journey from the Fall
- Outstanding Comedian: Margaret Cho

Honorees

- Pioneer Award: Nobu Matsuhisa, restaurateur
- Lifetime Achievement Award: Chow Yun-fat, actor
- Visionary Award: Vivienne Tam, fashion designer

Viewer's Choice

- Favorite Reality Star: Yul Kwon, Survivor

=== 2006 ===
- Outstanding Television Actress: Yunjin Kim, Lost
- Outstanding Television Actor: Daniel Dae Kim, Lost
- Outstanding Film Performance: Stephen Chow, Kung Fu Hustle
- Outstanding Film: Kung Fu Hustle

Honorees

- Outstanding Live Performance: Linkin Park
- Outstanding Stylemaker: Kimora Lee Simmons, Baby Phat
- Outstanding Newcomer: Lynn Chen, Saving Face
