= Nelsan Ellis =

American actor (1978–2017)

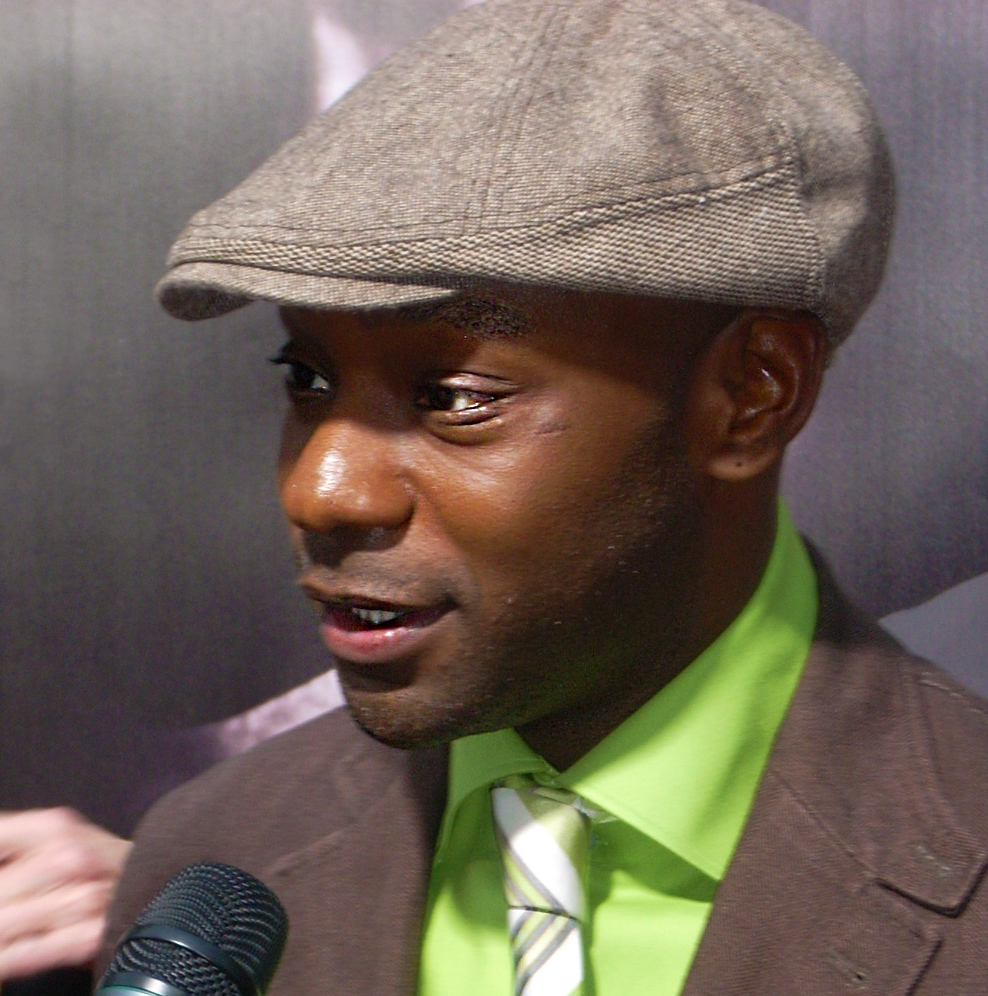
- Ellis in 2009
- Born: November 30, 1977; Harvey, Illinois, U.S.
- Died: July 8, 2017 (aged 39); New York City, U.S.
- Education: Illinois State University; Juilliard School (BFA)
- Occupation: Actor
- Years active: 2002–2017
- Children: 2

Nelsan Ellis (November 30, 1977 – July 8, 2017) was an American actor. He achieved critical acclaim for his portrayal of Lafayette Reynolds in the HBO television series True Blood (2008–2014), for which he won a Satellite Award from the International Press Academy, among other accolades. He also starred as Shinwell Johnson in Elementary from 2016 to 2017, and played a variety of guest roles on television.

In addition to his television work, Ellis appeared in several feature films throughout his career. He portrayed Eddie Sweat in the Disney sports drama Secretariat (2010), was Martin Luther King Jr. in Lee Daniels's The Butler (2013), and was Bobby Byrd in the 2014 James Brown biopic Get on Up. His final acting role was in True to the Game, which was released posthumously.

== Early life ==
Ellis was born in Harvey, Illinois, near Chicago, the son of Jackie Ellis and Tommie Lee Thompson. When Ellis and his siblings were young, their mother, a single parent after her divorce, broke down after the death of her brother. Ellis and his siblings became wards of the state, and later were raised in Bessemer, Alabama, by their maternal grandmother. He was diagnosed with dyslexia in second grade.

In Alabama, Ellis attended Jess Lanier High School for a year and transferred to McAdory High School. He moved back to Illinois at age 15, where he lived with his maternal aunt. In 1997 he graduated from Thornridge High School in Dolton, Illinois.

He joined the United States Marine Corps at the age of 17. Following this, Ellis attended Illinois State University.

In 2000, at the age of 22, he was accepted for enrollment at the Juilliard School, where he befriended Rutina Wesley, later a colleague in the series True Blood. Ellis earned a Bachelor of Fine Arts degree from Juilliard in 2004.

== Career ==
Ellis began his acting career in the early 2000s, with a role in the short film Lost. In 2005, he starred in the television film Warm Springs. From 2005 to 2006, he played the recurring role of Carter Howard in the television series The Inside. He followed this up with guest roles in Veronica Mars and Without a Trace, both in 2007.

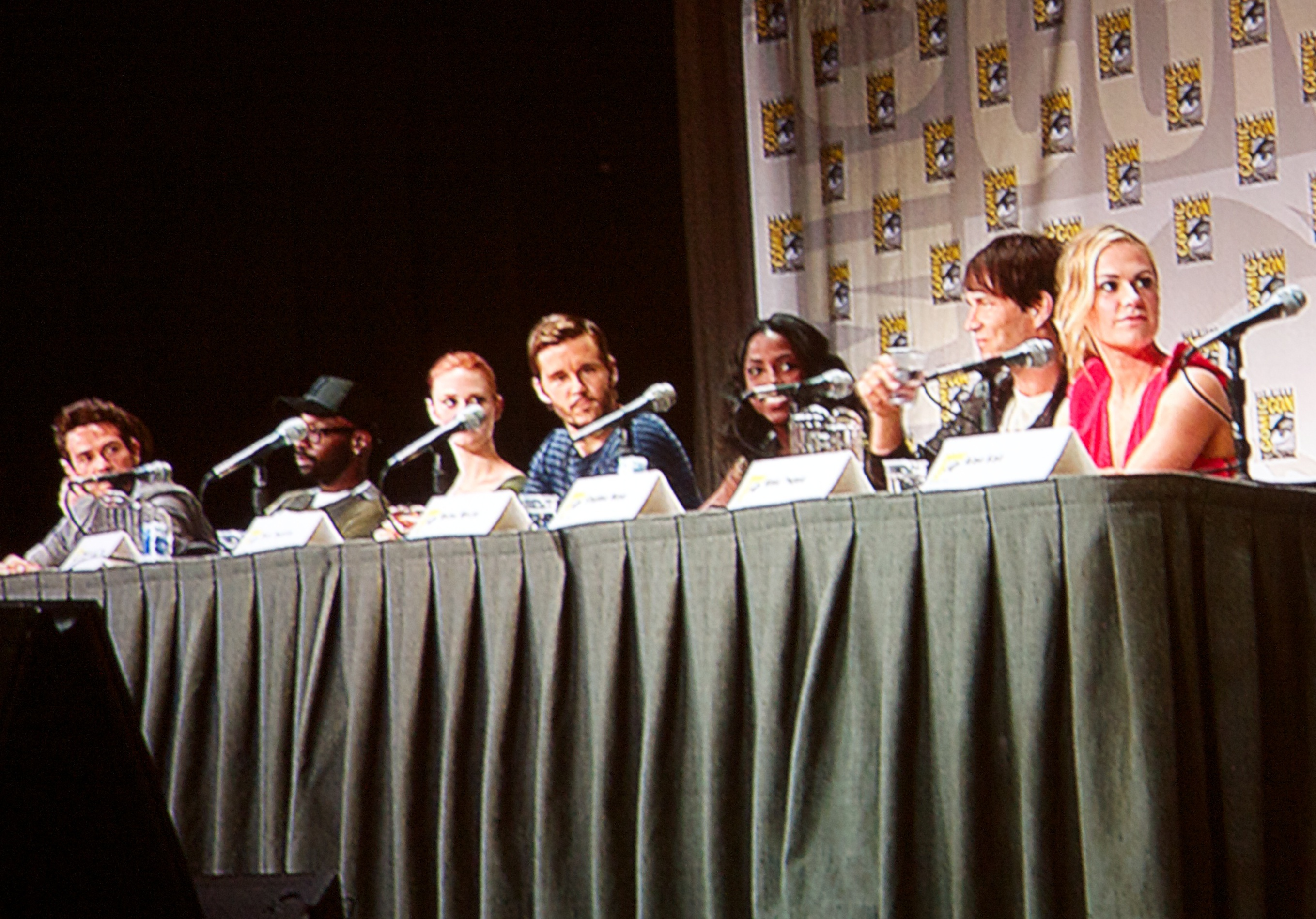
Ellis at the International Comic-Con San Diego with (l to r) Kevin Alejandro, Ellis, Deborah Ann Woll, Ryan Kwanten, Rutina Wesley, Stephen Moyer, and Anna Paquin to promote True Blood in 2011.

In mid-2007, Ellis was cast as Lafayette Reynolds in the pilot for True Blood, as a short-order cook at Merlotte's Bar & Grill, a drug dealer, a member of Jason Stackhouse's road crew, and Tara Thornton's cousin. The pilot was shot in the early summer of 2007 and was officially ordered to series in August. Production on the series began later that fall.

In casting Lafayette Reynolds, Alan Ball had concerns because the character's homosexuality would be a dominating trait. He said "you don't want to bring in someone who's going to play that in a phony way". Nelsan Ellis said that it took him a few episodes to find the character. Ellis said that he based many of Lafayette's mannerisms on his mother and his sister, and that the costuming also helped him to get into character. He told The Philadelphia Inquirer:

I have more makeup on than any of the females in the cast. Once they get me with the fake eyelashes and the eye makeup, I listen to some Rihanna and I'm there.

True Blood premiered on September 7, 2008, and concluded on August 24, 2014, comprising seven seasons and 80 episodes. In 2008, Ellis received a Satellite Award from the International Press Academy for best supporting actor in a television series for his role as Lafayette Reynolds. In 2009, he was nominated for a Scream Award for Best Supporting Actor. In 2011, he won the NAACP Image Award for Outstanding Supporting Actor in a Drama Series for his performance in True Blood.

Ellis also performed in several feature films; his early roles include The Express: The Ernie Davis Story (2008) and The Soloist (2009). In 2010, he portrayed Eddie Sweat in the Disney sports drama Secretariat.

In 2012, Ellis was cast as Martin Luther King Jr. in a supporting performance in Lee Daniels' The Butler. The Butler received mostly positive reviews from critics, with a 71% rating on the film critic aggregate site Rotten Tomatoes, based on 171 reviews.

The following year, Ellis joined the cast of Get on Up, a biographical drama film about the life of singer James Brown. He portrayed Bobby Byrd, Brown's longtime friend. Get on Up was met with positive reviews from critics.

From 2016 to 2017, Ellis starred as Shinwell Johnson in the TV series Elementary. His character dies near the end of Season 5. The first episode to air after Ellis' death, the season 6 premiere, ended with the screen "In Memory of Our Friend Nelsan Ellis". His final acting role was in True to the Game, which was released posthumously.

== Death ==
Ellis died at the age of 39 on July 8, 2017, in Woodhull Medical Center in Brooklyn, New York. His family released a statement on July 10, 2017, saying that he had an ongoing struggle with drug and alcohol abuse. He had been reluctant to talk to anyone about his addiction because of his sense of shame. In the days prior to his death, Ellis was attempting to withdraw from alcohol on his own; he was hospitalized due to serious complications from alcohol withdrawal syndrome, which resulted in his death. Ellis was survived by his son, Breon Ellis and newborn daughter.

== Awards and nominations ==
- While at Juilliard, Ellis wrote a semi-autobiographical play entitled Ugly, which was performed at the school and later won the Lincoln Center's Martin E. Segal Award. The play was influenced by his pregnant sister's murder at the hands of her husband.
- 2008 – Satellite Award from the International Press Academy for best supporting actor in a television series for his role as Lafayette Reynolds in HBO's True Blood.
- 2009 – NewNowNext Awards Brink of Fame: Actor award.
- 2009 – Ewwy Award for Best Supporting Actor in a Drama Series for True Blood.
- 2009 – Scream Award for Best Supporting Actor for True Blood.
- 2011 – NAACP Image Award for Outstanding Supporting Actor in a Drama Series for True Blood.

== Filmography ==
=== Film ===
Year	Title	Role	Notes
2002	Lost	Hoffa	Short film
2005	Trespass	Donny	Short film
2008	The Express: The Ernie Davis Story	Will Davis Jr.	
2009	The Soloist	David Carter	
2009	Talent	Titus	
2010	Secretariat	Eddie Sweat	
2011	The Help	Henry the Waiter	
2012	The Reluctant Fundamentalist	Wainwright	
2013	Page 36	Writer and Director	Short film
2013	The Butler	Martin Luther King Jr.	
2013	Gods Behaving Badly	Dionysus	
2014	Get On Up	Bobby Byrd	
2015	The Stanford Prison Experiment	Jesse Fletcher	
2016	Little Boxes	Mack Burns	
2017	True to the Game	Tyrik	Dedicated in his memory
2018	Roxanne Roxanne	Mr. Lester	Posthumous release

=== Television ===
Year	Title	Role	Notes
2005	Warm Springs	Roy Collier	Television film
2005–2006	The Inside	Carter Howard	12 episodes
2007	Veronica Mars	Apollo Bukenya	Episode: "I Know What You'll Do Next Summer"
2007	Without a Trace	Deng Nimieri	Episode: "Lost Boy"
2008–2014	True Blood	Lafayette Reynolds	Regular; 80 episodes Won Satellite Award for Best Supporting Actor – Series, Miniseries or Television Film; Won Satellite Award for Best Cast – Television Series; Nominated for a Screen Actors Guild Award for Outstanding Performance by an Ensemble in a Drama Series; Won Ewwy Award for best supporting actor in a Drama series Won NewNowNext Award for Brink of Fame: Actor; Nominated for a Scream Award for best supporting actor
2015	RuPaul's Drag Race	Himself, Guest Judge	Episode: "Conjoined Queens"
2016–2017	Elementary	Shinwell Johnson	Main character; 11 episodes
