= Andra Fuller =

American actor

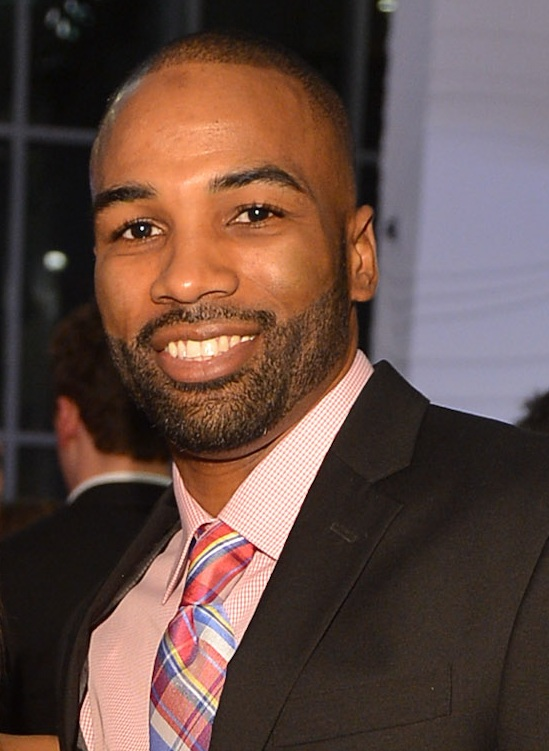
- Fuller at the 2013 Canadian Screen Awards
- Born: May 29, 1979 (age 47); Houston, Texas, U.S.
- Education: Baylor University
- Occupations: Actor; comedian
- Years active: 2006–present

Andra Fuller (born May 29, 1979 in Houston, Texas) is an American actor and stand-up comedian, best known for his role in The CW drama series The L.A. Complex.

== Early life ==
The youngest of three siblings, he was educated at Baylor University, where he served as President of the campus chapter of Alpha Phi Alpha Fraternity.

== Career ==
Fuller described the pinnacle of his stand-up career as performing at the Apollo Theater in Harlem, New York. Moving to Los Angeles in 2008, however, he found fewer opportunities for his work as a comedian. Instead, he enjoys work in dramatic roles on the big screen, television and stage with projects like The Game, You Can't Fight Christmas, Another Man Will, True to the Game, Love by the 10th Date, Deuces and The LA Complex. Apart from The L.A. Complex, he has worked on Black&Sexy TV, Issa Rae's Roomieloverfriends, and Aaron McGruder's comedy series, Black Jesus, which attracted criticism for its depiction of Christ in a twentieth-century inner city environment. Fuller responded to this criticism by claiming that it outweighed "how much heart the show has,"' Most recently he has appeared in Here We Go Again on TVOne.

== Personal life ==
Fuller resides in Los Angeles.

== Filmography ==
=== Films ===
Year	Title	Role	Notes
2007	Walking Tall: Lone Justice	Inmate	Video
2007	Gettin' Paid	-	Video
2015	Beautiful Destroyer	Cecil	
2016	9 Rides	Hipster Man	
2017	Deuces	Solomon Garret	
2017	Love by the 10th Date	Chris Kellman	TV movie
2017	Dope Fiend	Profit	
2017	True to the Game	Jerrell Jackson	
2017	You Can't Fight Christmas	Edmund James	
2017	Woe	Adonis	Short
2018	A Stone Cold Christmas	Ken Kurt	TV movie
2019	Hip Hop Holiday	Caleb	
2020	Crossroads	Leighton Williams	Short
2020	Life Without Hope	Life	
2020	True to the Game 2	Jerrell Jackson	
2021	Dear Best Friend	Alex	
2021	A Christmas Stray	Ethan	TV movie

=== Television series ===
Year	Title	Role	Notes
2006-07	Prison Break	Trey	Episode: "Unearthed" & "John Doe"
2008	iCarly	Paramedic	Episode: "iHurt Lewbert"
2009	The Secret Life of the American Teenager	Intelligent Bad Dude	Episode: "Money for Nothing, Chicks for Free"
2010	NCIS	Navy Petty Officer Scott Roebuck	Episode: "Moonlighting"
2010	Entourage	Room Service Guy	Episode: "Lose Yourself"
2012	Sex Ed: The Series	-	Episode: "The Body Electric"
2012	The L.A. Complex	Kaldrick King	Main cast
2012-14	RoomieLoverFriends	Jayson	Main cast
2014	That Guy	Jayson	Episode: "The Ruiner"
2014	Rush	Bossa Nova	Episode: "Get Lucky"
2014-15	Black Jesus	Fish	Main cast: season 1-2
2015	Guy Theory	Jason Carter	Episode: "Perfect Storm"
2015	The Game	Roger Keith Jr.	Recurring cast: season 9
2016	The Number: The Reboot	Jay	Episode: "The Intro"
2016	Here We Go Again	Victor	Main cast
2017	Bronzeville	Samson West/Tyrone	Episode: "8, 45, 51" & "7, 18"
2020	The Haves and the Have Nots	Rodell	Recurring cast: season 7
2022	I Got a Story to Tell	Evan	Episode: "Before I Let Go"

== Awards and nominations ==
Year	Awards	Category	Nominated work	Result
2013	Canadian Screen Awards	Best Actor in a Continuing Leading Dramatic Role	The L.A. Complex	Nominated
