= Teri Woods =

American novelist (born 1968)

Teri Woods (born March 8, 1968) is an American novelist from Philadelphia, Pennsylvania, associated with the urban fiction genre.

Woods finished writing her first novel, True to the Game, in 1992 while working at a law firm in Philadelphia. She spent six years submitting the work to numerous publishers, all of which rejected her. In 1998, Woods had copies of the book printed herself and began to hand-sell the novel to booksellers in and around the Philadelphia area and eventually across the United States, ultimately starting Teri Woods Publishing. Principally publishing in the urban fiction genre, the publishing house is aimed at a demographic largely ignored by major publishers. Woods's success helped her negotiate a multimillion-dollar contract with Hachette Book Group USA to re-release her previously published novels. The novel has been situated within the emergence of the 1990s street fiction, with scholarship linking the genre to the period's crime and welfare-reform policies.

In 2015, it was announced that True to the Game was being produced into a film of the same name. It took until 2021 for the film to appear in cinemas, however, with an IMDB score of 4.3 as of December 2025.

Woods has also authored several children's books, some of which were illustrated by Blueberry Illustrations. A chronological listing of her works can be found on BookSeriesInOrder.com.

Woods is the sister of Dexter Wansel, American keyboardist.
