= 17th Annual Black Reel Awards =

Film-industry awards in 2017

17th Black Reel Awards
- Date: February 16, 2017
- Location: Washington, D.C.

The 17th Annual Black Reel Awards ceremony, presented by the Foundation for the Augmentation of African-Americans in Film (FAAAF) and honoring the best films of 2016, took place on February 16, 2017, beginning at 8:00 p.m. EST (5:00 p.m. PST). During the ceremony, FAAAF will present the Black Reel Awards in 28 categories.

Moonlight led all films with 13 nominations.

== Schedule ==
| Date | Event |
|---|---|
| Monday, December 5, 2016 | Nominations polls opens at 8:00 a.m. EST (05:00, 5 Dec. UTC) (5:00 a.m. PST) |
| Friday, December 9, 2016 | Nominations polls close at 8:00 p.m. EST (01:00, 9 Dec. UTC) (5:00 p.m. PST) |
| Wednesday, December 14, 2016 | Nominations announced at 8:00 a.m. EST (13:30 UTC) (5:00 a.m. PST) |
| Thursday, December 15, 2016 | Final voting begins |
| Tuesday, December 20, 2016 | Final polls close at 8:00 p.m. EST (01:00, 20 Dec. UTC) (5:00 p.m. PST) |
| Thursday, February 16, 2017 | 17th Annual Black Reel Awards presentation |

== Winners and nominees ==
Winners are highlighted in bold.

=== Film ===
| Best Film | Best Director |
|---|---|
| **Moonlight**; 13th; Fences; Loving; Manchester by the Sea | **Barry Jenkins – Moonlight**; Don Cheadle – Miles Ahead; Antoine Fuqua – The Magnificent Seven; Nate Parker – The Birth of a Nation; Denzel Washington – Fences |
| Best Actor | Best Actress |
| **Denzel Washington – Fences**; Don Cheadle – Miles Ahead; Nate Parker – The Birth of a Nation; Parker Sawyers – Southside With You; Denzel Washington – The Magnificent Seven | **Ruth Negga – Loving**; Taraji P. Henson – Hidden Figures; Royalty Hightower – The Fits; Sasha Lane – American Honey; Madina Nwalanga – Queen of Katwe |
| Best Supporting Actor | Best Supporting Actress |
| **Mahershala Ali – Moonlight**; Jovan Adepo – Fences; Stephen McKinley Henderson – Fences; André Holland – Moonlight; Ashton Sanders – Moonlight | **Viola Davis – Fences**; Naomie Harris – Moonlight; Janelle Monáe – Hidden Figures; Janelle Monáe – Moonlight; Lupita Nyong'o – Queen of Katwe |
| Best Breakthrough Performance, Male | Best Breakthrough Performance, Female |
| **Trevante Rhodes – Moonlight**; Jovan Adepo – Fences; Markees Christmas – Morris from America; Alex Hibbert – Moonlight; Ashton Sanders – Moonlight | **Janelle Monáe – Hidden Figures**; Royalty Hightower – The Fits; Leslie Jones – Ghostbusters; Aja Naomi King – The Birth of a Nation; Sasha Lane – American Honey |
| Best Ensemble | Best Screenplay, Adapted or Original |
| **Yesi Ramirez – Moonlight**; Nicole Abellera and Jeanne McCarthy – Keanu; Andrea Craven, Craig Fincannon, Lisa Mae Fincannon, Mary Vernieu, Michelle Wade Byrd – The Birth of a Nation; Victoria Thomas – Fences; Victoria Thomas – Hidden Figures | **Barry Jenkins – Moonlight**; Don Cheadle and Steven Baigelman – Miles Ahead; Nate Parker – The Birth of a Nation; Jordan Peele and Alex Rubens – Keanu; August Wilson – Fences |
| Best Feature Documentary | Best Voice Performance |
| **13th – Ava DuVernay**; I Am Not Your Negro – Raoul Peck; Life, Animated – Roger Ross Williams; Miss Sharon Jones! – Barbara Kopple; O.J.: Made in America – Ezra Edelman | **Idris Elba – The Jungle Book**; Idris Elba – Finding Dory; Idris Elba – Zootopia; Dwayne Johnson – Moana; Lupita Nyong'o – The Jungle Book |
| Best Independent Feature | Best Independent Short |
| **American Honey – Andrea Arnold**; How to Tell You’re a Douchebag – Tahir Jetter; Hunter Gatherer – Joshua Locy; The Land – Steven Caple Jr.; Morris from America – Chad Hartigan | **$15 Kicks – Jenn Shaw**; #Whereisbeauty – Angela McCrae; 2 Fists Up – Spike Lee; 86-32 – Randy Wilkins; Black Card – Pete Chatmon |
| Best Foreign Film | World Cinema Motion Picture |
| **Eye of the Storm (Burkina Faso) – Sékou Traoré**; Aisha (Tanzania) – Chande Omar; Divines (France) – Uda Benyamina; Lamb (Ethiopia) – Yared Zeleke; Rain the Color of Blue with a Little Red in It (Niger) – Christopher Kirley | **Where the Road Runs Out – Rudolf Buitendach**; Ayanda – Sara Blecher; The Cursed Ones – Nana Obiri Yeboah and Maximilian Claussen |
| Best Emerging Filmmaker | Best First Screenplay |
| **Ezra Edelman – O.J.: Made in America**; Steven Caple Jr. – The Land; Tahir Jetter – How to Tell You’re a Douchebag; Rita Coburn Whack – Maya Angelou and Still I Rise; Yared Zeleke – Lamb | **Steven Caple Jr. – The Land**; Hermon Hailay – Price of Love; Yared Zeleke – Lamb |
| Best Original or Adapted Song | Outstanding Original Score |
| **"I'm Still Here" from Miss Sharon Jones! – Sharon Jones & the Dap-Kings**; "A Letter to the Free" from 13th – Common and Bilal; "Back to Life" from Queen of Katwe – Alicia Keys; "Start" from Southside With You – John Legend; "Surrender" from Hidden Figures – Lalah Hathaway and Pharrell Williams | **Nicholas Britell – Moonlight**; Robert Glasper – Miles Ahead; Henry Jackman – The Birth of a Nation; Benjamin Wallfisch, Pharrell Williams and Hans Zimmer – Hidden Figures; Marcelo Zarvos – Fences |

=== Television ===
| Best Television Miniseries or Movie | Outstanding Director in a Television Miniseries or Movie |
|---|---|
| **The People v. O. J. Simpson: American Crime Story (FX) – Chip Vucelich, Alexis Martin Woodall and John Travolta**; American Crime (ABC) – Lori-Etta Taub; Confirmation (HBO) – Darren M. Demetre; Love Under New Management: The Miki Howard Story (TV One) – Carl Craig, Teyonah Parris, Ron Robinson and Eric Tomosunas; Roots (History Channel) – Ann Kindberg & Alissa M. Kantrow | **John Singleton – The People v. O. J. Simpson: American Crime Story ("The Race Card") (FX)**; Angela Bassett – American Horror Story: Roanoke ("Episode 6") (FX); Thomas Carter – Roots ("Night 3") (History Channel); Anthony Hemingway – The People v. O. J. Simpson: American Crime Story ("The Dream Team") (FX); John Ridley – American Crime ("Season Two, Episode One") (ABC) |
| Best Actor in a TV Movie or Limited Series | Best Actress in a TV Movie or Limited Series |
| **Courtney B. Vance – The People v. O. J. Simpson: American Crime Story (FX)**; Michael Ealy – Secrets and Lies (ABC); Cuba Gooding Jr. – The People v. O. J. Simpson: American Crime Story (FX); Malachi Kirby – Roots (History Channel); Wendell Pierce – Confirmation (HBO) | **Kerry Washington – Confirmation (HBO)**; Rhyon Nicole Brown – Surviving Compton: Dre, Suge & Michel'le (Lifetime); Audra McDonald – Lady Day at Emerson's Bar and Grill (HBO); Sophie Okonedo – The Hollow Crown: The Wars of the Roses (PBS); Teyonah Parris – Love Under New Management: The Miki Howard Story (TV One) |
| Best Supporting Actor in a TV Movie or Limited Series | Best Supporting Actress in a TV Movie or Limited Series |
| **Sterling K. Brown – The People v. O. J. Simpson: American Crime Story (FX)**; Andre Benjamin – American Crime (ABC); Curtis Hamilton – Surviving Compton: Dre, Suge & Michel'le (Lifetime); Tip "T.I." Harris – Roots (History Channel); Michael K. Williams – The Night Of (HBO) | **Regina King – American Crime (ABC)**; Angela Bassett – American Horror Story: Roanoke (FX); Emayatzy Corinealdi – Roots (History Channel); Anika Noni Rose – Roots (History Channel); Keesha Sharp – The People v. O. J. Simpson: American Crime Story (FX) |
| Outstanding Screenplay in a TV Movie or Limited Series | Best Television Documentary or Special |
| **Joe Robert Cole – The People v. O. J. Simpson: American Crime Story ("The Race Card") (FX)**; John Ridley – American Crime ("Season Two, Episode One") (ABC); Stella Meghie – Jean of the Joneses (TV One); Christine Swanson and Rhonda Baraka – Love Under New Management: The Miki Howard Story (TV One); Joe Robert Cole – The People v. O. J. Simpson: American Crime Story ("A Jury in Jail") (FX) | **Lemonade (HBO) – Beyoncé Knowles and Khalil Joseph**; Black America Since MLK: Still I Rise (HBO) – Talleah Bridges; Hamilton’s America (PBS) – Alex Horowitz; Jackie Robinson (HBO) – Ken Burns; Streets of Compton (CBS) – Leon Knoles |
