= Black Reel Award for Outstanding Original Soundtrack =

Annual US film award

This article lists the winners and nominees for the Black Reel Award for Outstanding Original Soundtrack. This category was retired during the 2008 ceremony.

== Winners and nominees ==
Winners are listed first and highlighted in bold.

=== 2000s ===
Year	Film	Ref
2000
2000	**The Best Man**	
2000	Life	
2000	Summer of Sam	
2000	The Wood	
2001
2001	**Love & Basketball**	
2001	Backstage	
2001	Bamboozled	
2001	Ghost Dog: The Way of the Samurai	
2001	The Ladies Man	
2002
2002	**Ali**	
2002	Baby Boy	
2002	The Brothers	
2002	Hardball	
2002	Training Day	
2003
2003	**Standing in the Shadows of Motown**	
2003	8 Mile	
2003	Barbershop	
2003	Brown Sugar	
2003	Undercover Brother	
2004
2004	**The Fighting Temptations**	
2004	2 Fast 2 Furious	
2004	Bad Boys II	
2004	Deliver Us from Eva	
2004	Tupac: Resurrection	
2005	—	
2006
2006	**Hustle & Flow**	
2006	Four Brothers	
2006	Hitch	
2006	Rent	
2006	Roll Bounce	
2007
2007	**Dreamgirls**	
2007	Idlewild	
2007	Dave Chappelle's Block Party	
2007	Something New	
2007	Take the Lead	
