= Black Reel Award for Outstanding Actor, TV Movie or Limited Series =

Annual US television award

- Awarded for: Outstanding Actor, TV Movie or Limited Series
- Country: United States
- Presented by: Black Reel Awards
- First award: 2000
- Currently held by: Leslie Odom Jr., Hamilton (2021)
- Website: blackreelawards.com1

This article lists the winners and nominees for the Black Reel Award for Outstanding Actor in a Television Movie or Limited Series. The category was retired during the 2008 ceremony, but later returned in 2012. In May 2017 the category was moved from the film awards as part of the Black Reel Awards for Television honors thus resulting in two separate winners in 2017.

== Winners and nominees ==
Winners are listed first and highlighted in bold.

=== 2000s ===
Year	Actor	Film	Network	Ref
2000
2000	**Don Cheadle**	**A Lesson Before Dying**	**HBO**	
2000	Andre Braugher	Love Songs	Showtime	
2000	Louis Gossett Jr.	Love Songs	Showtime	
2000	Delroy Lindo	Strange Justice	Showtime	
2000	Sidney Poitier	The Simple Life of Noah Dearborn	CBS	
2001
2001	**T. K. Carter**	**The Corner**	**HBO**	
2001	Leon	Little Richard	NBC	
2001	Sean Nelson	The Corner	HBO	
2001	Ving Rhames	Holiday Heart	Showtime	
2001	Wesley Snipes	Disappearing Acts	HBO	
2002
2002	**Roger Guenveur Smith**	**A Huey P. Newton Story**	**Starz**	
2002	Morris Chestnut	The Killing Yard	Showtime	
2002	Danny Glover	3 A.M.	Showtime	
2002	Gregory Hines	Bojangles	Showtime	
2002	Jeffrey Wright	Boycott	HBO	
2003
2003	**Harry J. Lennix**	**Keep the Faith, Baby**	**Showtime**	
2003	Andre Braugher	10,000 Black Men Named George	Showtime	
2003	Ving Rhames	Sins of the Father	FX	
2004
2004	**Forest Whitaker**	**Deacons for Defense**	**Showtime**	
2004	Danny Glover	Good Fences	Showtime	
2004	Carl Lumbly	Sounder	ABC	
2005
2005	**Jamie Foxx**	**Redemption: The Stan Tookie Williams Story**	**FX**	
2005	Mos Def	Something the Lord Made	HBO	
2005	Roger Guenveur Smith	Justice	Starz	
2006
2006	**Michael Ealy**	**Their Eyes Were Watching God**	**ABC**	
2006	Idris Elba	Sometimes in April	HBO	
2006	Delroy Lindo	The Exonerated	truTV	
2006	Anthony Mackie	Sucker Free City	Showtime	
2006	Ving Rhames	Kojak	USA Network	
2007
2007	**Andre Braugher**	**Thief**	**FX**	
2008	—N/a			

=== 2010s ===
Year	Actor	Film	Network	Ref
2010–11	—N/a			
2012
2012	**Idris Elba**	**Luther**	**BBC America**	
2012	Eric Benét	Trinity Goodheart	UP	
2012	Laurence Fishburne	Thurgood	HBO	
2012	Samuel L. Jackson	The Sunset Limited	HBO	
2012	Mykelti Williamson	Have a Little Faith	ABC	
2013
2013	**Sean Patrick Thomas**	**Murder on the 13th Floor**	**Lifetime**	
2013	Rockmond Dunbar	Raising Izzie	UP	
2013	Cuba Gooding Jr.	Firelight	ABC	
2013	Trevor Jackson	Let It Shine	Disney Channel	
2013	Michael Jai White	Somebody's Child	UP	
2014
2014	**Chiwetel Ejiofor**	**Dancing on the Edge**	**Starz**	
2014	Keith David	Pastor Brown	Lifetime	
2014	Omari Hardwick	A Christmas Blessing	TV One	
2014	Ernie Hudson	Pastor Brown	Lifetime	
2014	Mike Tyson	Mike Tyson: Undisputed Truth	HBO	
2015
2015	**Larenz Tate**	**Gun Hill**	**BET**	
2015	Charles S. Dutton	Comeback Dad	UP	
2015	David Alan Grier	An En Vogue Christmas	Lifetime	
2015	Ving Rhames	A Day Late and a Dollar Short	Lifetime	
2015	Keith Robinson	Lyfe's Journey	UP	
2016
2016	**David Oyelowo**	**Nightingale**	**HBO**	
2016	Steve Harris	Let the Church Say Amen	BET	
2016	James Earl Jones	Great Performances: "Driving Miss Daisy"	PBS	
2016	Amin Joseph	Stock Option	TV One	
2016	Michael K. Williams	The Spoils Before Dying	IFC	
2017
2017	**Courtney B. Vance**	**The People v. O. J. Simpson: American Crime Story**	**FX**	
2017	Michael Ealy	Secrets and Lies	ABC	
2017	Cuba Gooding Jr.	The People v. O. J. Simpson: American Crime Story	FX	
2017	Malachi Kirby	Roots	History Channel	
2017	Wendell Pierce	Confirmation	HBO	
2017
2017	**Woody McClain**	**The New Edition Story**	**BET**	
2017	Bryshere Y. Gray	The New Edition Story	BET	
2017	Luke James	The New Edition Story	BET	
2017	Laurence Fishburne	Madiba	BET	
2017	Stephan James	Shots Fired	FOX	
2018
2018	**Michael B. Jordan**	**Fahrenheit 451**	**HBO**	
2018	Mike Colter	Marvel's the Defenders	Netflix	
2018	Dulé Hill	Psych: The Movie	USA Network	
2018	Terrence Howard	Electric Dreams	Amazon Prime Video	
2018	John Legend	Jesus Christ Superstar Live in Concert	NBC	
2019
2019	**Jharrel Jerome**	**When They See Us**	**Netflix**	
2019	Mahershala Ali	True Detective (season 3)	HBO	
2019	Idris Elba	Luther	BBC One	
2019	Woody McClain	The Bobby Brown Story	BET	
2019	Ashton Sanders	Native Son	HBO Films	

=== 2020s ===
Year	Actor	Film	Network	Ref
2020
2020	**Blair Underwood**	**Self Made: Inspired by the Life of Madam C. J. Walker**	**Netflix**	
2020	Andre Braugher	Live in Front of a Studio Audience: 'All in the Family' and 'Good Times'	ABC	
2020	Andre Holland	The Eddy	Netflix	
2020	Alano Miller	Cherish the Day	OWN	
2020	Jeremy Pope	Hollywood	Netflix	
2021
2021	**Leslie Odom Jr.**	**Hamilton**	**Disney+**	
2021	Chris Rock	Fargo	FX	
2021	Nnamdi Asomugha	Sylvie's Love	Amazon Studios	
2021	Dulé Hill	Psych 2: Lassie Come Home	Peacock	
2021	Mamoudou Athie	Black Box	Amazon Studios	

== Superlatives ==
Superlative	Outstanding Actor, TV Movie/Limited Series
Actor with most awards	Multiple (1)
Actor with most nominations	Andre Braugher; Ving Rhames (4)
Actor with most nominations without ever winning	Ving Rhames (4)

== Programs with multiple nominations ==
3 nominations

- The New Edition Story

2 nominations

- American Crime Story
- The Corner
- Love Songs
- Luther

== Performers with multiple nominations ==
4 nominations

- Andre Braugher
- Ving Rhames

3 nominations

- Idris Elba

2 nominations

- Laurence Fishburne
- Danny Glover
- Cuba Gooding Jr.
- Dulé Hill
- Roger Guenveur Smith
- Delroy Lindo
- Woody McClain

== Total awards by network ==
- HBO - 4
- FX - 3
- BET - 2
- Netflix - 2
- Showtime - 2
- Starz - 2
- ABC - 1
- BBC America - 1
- Disney+ - 1
- Lifetime - 1
