= Black Reel Award for Outstanding Actress, TV Movie or Limited Series =

Annual US television award

- Awarded for: Outstanding Actress, TV Movie or Limited Series
- Country: United States
- Presented by: Black Reel Awards
- First award: 2000
- Currently held by: Michaela Coel, I May Destroy You (2021)
- Website: blackreelawards.com

This article lists the winners and nominees for the Black Reel Award for Outstanding Actress in a Television Movie or Limited Series. The category was retired during the 2008 ceremony, but later returned in 2012. In May 2017 the category was moved from the film awards as part of the Black Reel Awards for Television honors thus resulting in two separate winners in 2017.

== Winners and nominees ==
Winners are listed first and highlighted in bold.

=== 2000s ===
| Year | Actress | Film | Network | Ref |
|---|---|---|---|---|
2000
| 2000 | **Halle Berry** | **Introducing Dorothy Dandridge** | **HBO** | |
| 2000 | Jenifer Lewis | Jackie's Back | Lifetime | |
| 2000 | Regina Taylor | Strange Justice | Showtime | |
| 2000 | Lynn Whitfield | Love Songs | Showtime | |
| 2000 | Alfre Woodard | Funny Valentines | HBO | |
2001
| 2001 | **Khandi Alexander** | **The Corner** | **HBO** | |
| 2001 | Sanaa Lathan | Disappearing Acts | HBO | |
| 2001 | Alfre Woodard | Holiday Heart | Showtime | |
2002
| 2002 | **Angela Bassett** | **Ruby's Bucket of Blood** | **Showtime** | |
| 2002 | Pam Grier | 3 A.M. | Showtime | |
| 2002 | Nicole Ari Parker | Dancing in September | HBO | |
| 2002 | Phylicia Rashad | The Old Settler | PBS | |
| 2002 | Yolonda Ross | Stranger Inside | HBO | |
2003
| 2003 | **Angela Bassett** | **The Rosa Parks Story** | **CBS** | |
| 2003 | Kerry Washington | Lift | Showtime | |
| 2003 | Vanessa L. Williams | Keep the Faith, Baby | Showtime | |
2004
| 2004 | **Suzzanne Douglas** | **Sounder** | **ABC** | |
| 2004 | Whoopi Goldberg | Good Fences | Showtime | |
| 2004 | Raven-Symoné | The Cheetah Girls | Disney Channel | |
2005
| 2005 | **Lynn Whitfield** | **Redemption: The Stan Tookie Williams Story** | **FX** | |
| 2005 | Monica Calhoun | Justice | Starz | |
| 2005 | Anna Maria Horsford | Justice | Starz | |
2006
| 2006 | **S. Epatha Merkerson** | **Lackawanna Blues** | **HBO** | |
| 2006 | Halle Berry | Their Eyes Were Watching God | ABC | |
| 2006 | Roselyn Sanchez | Kojak | USA Network | |
2007
| 2007 | **Alexa Vega** | **Walkout** | **HBO** | |
| 2008 | —N/a | | | |

=== 2010s ===
| Year | Actress | Film | Network | Ref |
|---|---|---|---|---|
| 2010–11 | —N/a | | | |
2012
| 2012 | **Taraji P. Henson** | **Taken from Me: The Tiffany Rubin Story** | **Lifetime** | |
| 2012 | Rosario Dawson | Five | Lifetime | |
| 2012 | Jenifer Lewis | Five | Lifetime | |
| 2012 | Anika Noni Rose | Bag of Bones | A&E Network | |
| 2012 | Tracee Ellis Ross | Five | Lifetime | |
2013
| 2013 | **Aunjanue Ellis-Taylor** | **Abducted: The Carlina White Story** | **Lifetime** | |
| 2013 | Queen Latifah | Steel Magnolias | Lifetime | |
| 2013 | Keke Palmer | Abducted: The Carlina White Story | Lifetime | |
| 2013 | Lynn Whitfield | Somebody's Child | UP | |
| 2013 | Vanessa A. Williams | Raising Izzie | UP | |
2014
| 2014 | **Anika Noni Rose** | **The Watsons Go to Birmingham** | **Hallmark** | |
| 2014 | Angela Bassett | Betty and Coretta | Lifetime | |
| 2014 | Keke Palmer | CrazySexyCool: The TLC Story | VH1 | |
| 2014 | Salli Richardson-Whitfield | Pastor Brown | Lifetime | |
| 2014 | Gabrielle Union | Being Mary Jane | BET | |
2015
| 2015 | **Cicely Tyson** | **The Trip to Bountiful** | **Lifetime** | |
| 2015 | Whoopi Goldberg | A Day Late and a Dollar Short | Lifetime | |
| 2015 | Imani Hakim | The Gabby Douglas Story | Lifetime | |
| 2015 | LeToya Luckett | Seasons of Love | Lifetime | |
| 2015 | Zoe Saldaña | Rosemary's Baby | NBC | |
2016
| 2016 | **Queen Latifah** | **Bessie** | **HBO** | |
| 2016 | Yaya DaCosta | Whitney | Lifetime | |
| 2016 | Aunjanue Ellis-Taylor | The Book of Negroes | BET | |
| 2016 | Regina Hall | With This Ring | Lifetime | |
| 2016 | Shanice Williams | The Wiz Live! | NBC | |
2017
| 2017 | **Kerry Washington** | **Confirmation** | **HBO** | |
| 2017 | Rhyon Nicole Brown | Surviving Compton: Dre, Suge & Michel'le | Lifetime | |
| 2017 | Audra McDonald | Lady Day at Emerson's Bar and Grill | HBO | |
| 2017 | Sophie Okonedo | The Hollow Crown: The Wars of the Roses | PBS | |
| 2017 | Teyonah Parris | Love Under New Management: The Miki Howard Story | TV One | |
2017
| 2017 | **Sanaa Lathan** | **Shots Fired** | **FOX** | |
| 2017 | Nia Long | Beaches | Lifetime | |
| 2017 | Oprah Winfrey | The Immortal Life of Henrietta Lacks | HBO | |
| 2017 | Terry Pheto | Madiba | BET | |
| 2017 | Loretta Devine | The Lost Souls Cafe | TV One | |
2018
| 2018 | **Regina King** | **Seven Seconds** | **Netflix** | |
| 2018 | Carmen Ejogo | The Girlfriend Experience | Starz | |
| 2018 | Georgina Campbell | Black Mirror | Netflix | |
| 2018 | Janelle Monae | Electric Dreams | Amazon Prime Video | |
| 2018 | Jill Scott | Flint | Lifetime | |
2019
| 2019 | **Niecy Nash** | **When They See Us** | **Netflix** | |
| 2019 | Aunjanue Ellis-Taylor | When They See Us | Netflix | |
| 2019 | Alfre Woodard | Juanita | Netflix | |
| 2019 | Michaela Coel | Black Earth Rising | Netflix / BBC Two | |
| 2019 | Emayatzy Corinealdi | The Red Line | CBS | |

=== 2020s ===
| Year | Actor | Film | Network | Ref |
|---|---|---|---|---|
2020
| 2020 | **Regina King** | **Watchmen** | **HBO** | |
| 2020 | Viola Davis | Live in Front of a Studio Audience: 'All in the Family' and 'Good Times' | ABC | |
| 2020 | Octavia Spencer | Self Made: Inspired by the Life of Madam C. J. Walker | Netflix | |
| 2020 | Kerry Washington | Little Fires Everywhere | HULU | |
| 2020 | Aunjanue Ellis-Taylor | The Clark Sisters: First Ladies of Gospel | Lifetime | |
2021
| 2021 | **Michaela Coel** | **I May Destroy You** | **HBO** | |
| 2021 | Cynthia Erivo | Genius | National Geographic | |
| 2021 | Tessa Thompson | Sylvie's Love | Amazon Studios | |
| 2021 | Thuso Mbedu | The Underground Railroad | Amazon Prime Video | |
| 2021 | Nicole Beharie | Monsterland | HULU | |

== Superlatives ==
| Superlative | Outstanding Actress, TV Movie/Limited Series |
|---|---|
| Actress with most awards | Angela Bassett; Regina King (2) |
| Actress with most nominations | Aunjanue Ellis-Taylor (4) |
| Actress with most nominations without ever winning | Whoopi Goldberg; Jenifer Lewis; Keke Palmer (2) |

== Performers with multiple awards ==
2 wins

- Angela Bassett (consecutive)
- Regina King

== Programs with multiple nominations ==
3 nominations

- Five

2 nominations

- Abducted: The Carlina White Story
- Justice
- Lift
- When They See Us

== Performers with multiple nominations ==
4 Nominations

- Aunjanue Ellis-Taylor

3 Nominations

- Angela Bassett
- Kerry Washington
- Lynn Whitfield
- Alfre Woodard

2 Nominations

- Halle Berry
- Michaela Coel
- Whoopi Goldberg
- Regina King
- Sanaa Lathan
- Queen Latifah
- Jenifer Lewis
- Anika Noni Rose
- Keke Palmer

== Total awards by network ==
- HBO - 8
- Lifetime - 3
- Netflix - 2
- ABC - 1
- CBS - 1
- FOX - 1
- FX -1
- Hallmark - 1
- Showtime - 1
