= Black Reel Award for Outstanding Supporting Actor, TV Movie or Limited Series =

Annual US television award

- Awarded for: Outstanding Supporting Actor, TV Movie or Limited Series
- Country: United States
- Presented by: Black Reel Awards
- First award: 2000
- Currently held by: John Boyega, Small Axe (2021)
- Website: blackreelawards.com

This article lists the winners and nominees for the Black Reel Award for Outstanding Supporting Actor in a Television Movie or Limited Series. The category was retired during the 2008 ceremony, but later returned in 2013. In May 2017 the category was moved from the film awards as part of the Black Reel Awards for Television honors thus resulting in two separate winners in 2017.

== Winners and nominees ==
Winners are listed first and highlighted in bold.

=== 2000s ===
Year	Actor	Film	Network	Ref
2000
2000	**Mekhi Phifer**	**A Lesson Before Dying**	**HBO**	
2000	Obba Babatunde	Introducing Dorothy Dandridge	HBO	
2000	Carl Gordon	Love Songs	Showtime	
2000	Brent Jennings	Introducing Dorothy Dandridge	HBO	
2000	James Earl Jones	Santa and Pete	CBS	
2001
2001	**Glenn Plummer**	**The Corner**	**HBO**	
2001	Adewale Akinnuoye-Agbaje	Enslavement: The True Story of Fanny Kemble	Showtime	
2001	Vondie Curtis-Hall	Freedom Song	TNT	
2001	Vicellous Reon Shannon	Freedom Song	TNT	
2001	Mykelti Williamson	Holiday Heart	Showtime	
2002
2002	**Terrence Howard**	**Boycott**	**HBO**	
2002	Reg E. Cathey	Boycott	HBO	
2002	Erik Dellums	Boycott	HBO	
2002	Mekhi Phifer	Carmen: A Hip Hopera	MTV	
2002	Vicellous Reon Shannon	Dancing in September	HBO	
2003
2003	**Charles S. Dutton**	**10,000 Black Men Named George**	**Showtime**	
2003	Peter Francis James	The Rosa Parks Story	CBS	
2003	Russell Hornsby	Keep the Faith, Baby	Showtime	
2004
2004	**Jeffrey Wright**	**Angels in America**	**HBO**	
2004	Ossie Davis	Deacons for Defense	Showtime	
2004	Paul Winfield	Sounder	ABC	
2005
2005	**Clayton LeBouef**	**Something the Lord Made**	**HBO**	
2005	Reg E. Cathey	Everyday People	HBO	
2005	Stephen McKinley Henderson	Everyday People	HBO	
2006
2006	**Jeffrey Wright**	**Lackawanna Blues**	**HBO**	
2006	Oris Erhuero	Sometimes in April	HBO	
2006	Terrence Howard	Lackawanna Blues	HBO	
2006	Sean Nelson	Miracle's Boys	TeenNick	
2006	Ruben Santiago-Hudson	Their Eyes Were Watching God	ABC	
2007
2007	**Michael Peña**	**Walkout**	**HBO**	
2008	—N/a			

=== 2010s ===
Year	Actor	Film	Network	Ref
2010–12	—N/a			
2013
2013	**Courtney B. Vance**	**Let It Shine**	**Disney Channel**	
2013	Danny Glover	Hannah's Law	Hallmark	
2013	Louis Gossett Jr.	Smitty	UP	
2013	Boris Kodjoe	A Killer Amongst Us	Lifetime	
2013	Harry Lennix	A Beautiful Soul	TV One	
2014
2014	**Omari Hardwick**	**Being Mary Jane**	**BET**	
2014	Richard Brooks	Being Mary Jane	BET	
2014	Danny Glover	Muhammad Ali's Greatest Fight	HBO	
2014	Wood Harris	The Watsons Go to Birmingham	Hallmark	
2014	Ernie Hudson	Call Me Crazy: A Five Film	Lifetime	
2015
2015	**Blair Underwood**	**The Trip to Bountiful**	**Lifetime**	
2015	Richard T. Jones	Lyfe's Journey	UP	
2015	Harry Lennix	The Fright Night Files	TV One	
2015	Mekhi Phifer	A Day Late and a Dollar Short	Lifetime	
2015	Bokeem Woodbine	The Fright Night Files	TV One	
2016
2016	**Bokeem Woodbine**	**Fargo**	**FX**	
2016	Charles S. Dutton	Bessie	HBO	
2016	Cuba Gooding Jr.	The Book of Negroes	BET	
2016	David Alan Grier	The Wiz Live!	NBC	
2016	Michael K. Williams	Bessie	HBO	
2017
2017	**Sterling K. Brown**	**The People v. O. J. Simpson: American Crime Story**	**FX**	
2017	Andre Benjamin	American Crime	ABC	
2017	Curtis Hamilton	Surviving Compton: Dre, Suge & Michel'le	Lifetime	
2017	Tip "T.I." Harris	Roots	History Channel	
2017	Michael K. Williams	The Night Of	HBO	
2017
2017	**Wood Harris**	**The New Edition Story**	**BET**	
2017	Caleb McLaughlin	The New Edition Story	BET	
2017	Reg E. Cathey	The Immortal Life of Henrietta Lacks	HBO	
2017	Orlando Jones	Madiba	BET	
2017	Idris Elba	Guerrilla	Showtime	
2018
2018	**Russell Hornsby**	**Seven Seconds**	**Netflix**	
2018	Corey Champagne	Seven Seconds	Netflix	
2018	Brandon Victor Dixon	Jesus Christ Superstar Live in Concert	NBC	
2018	Babs Olusanmokun	Black Mirror	Netflix	
2018	Bokeem Woodbine	Unsolved: The Murders of Tupac and The Notorious B.I.G	USA	
2019
2019	**Michael K. Williams**	**When They See Us**	**Netflix**	
2019	Asante Blackk	When They See Us	Netflix	
2019	Caleel Harris	When They See Us	Netflix	
2019	Marquis Rodriguez	When They See Us	Netflix	
2019	Michael Ealy	Being Mary Jane: Becoming Pauletta	BET	

=== 2020s ===
Year	Actor	Film	Network	Ref
2020
2020	**Yahya Abdul-Mateen II**	**Watchmen**	**HBO**	
2020	Jovan Adepo	Watchmen	HBO	
2020	Bill Bellamy	Self Made: Inspired by the Life of Madam C. J. Walker	Netflix	
2020	Louis Gossett Jr.	Watchmen	HBO	
2020	Tituss Burgess	Unbreakable Kimmy Schmidt: Kimmy vs the Reverend	Netflix	
2021
2021	**John Boyega**	**Small Axe**	**Amazon Prime Video**	
2021	Paapa Essiedu	I May Destroy You	HBO	
2021	Courtney B. Vance	Genius	National Geographic	
2021	Daveed Diggs	Hamilton	Disney+	
2021	William Jackson Harper	The Underground Railroad	Amazon Prime Video	

== Superlatives ==
Superlative	Outstanding Supporting Actor, TV Movie/Limited Series
Actor with most awards	Jeffrey Wright (2)
Actor with most nominations	Reg E. Cathey; Mekhi Phifer; Michael K. Williams; Bokeem Woodbine (3)
Actor with most nominations without ever winning	Reg E. Cathey (3)

== Performers with multiple awards ==
2 wins

- Jeffrey Wright

== Programs with multiple nominations ==
4 nominations

- When They See Us

3 nominations

- Being Mary Jane
- Boycott
- Watchmen

2 nominations

- Bessie
- Everyday People
- Freedom Song
- Introducing Dorothy Dandridge
- Lackawanna Blues
- The New Edition Story
- Seven Seconds

== Performers with multiple nominations ==
3 Nominations

- Reg E. Cathey
- Mekhi Phifer
- Michael K. Williams
- Bokeem Woodbine

2 Nominations

- Charles S. Dutton
- Danny Glover
- Louis Gossett Jr.
- Wood Harris
- Russell Hornsby
- Terrence Howard
- Harry Lennix
- Vicellous Reon Shannon
- Courtney B. Vance
- Jeffrey Wright

== Total awards by network ==
- HBO - 8
- BET - 2
- FX - 2
- Netflix - 2
- Amazon Prime Video - 1
- Disney Channel - 1
- Lifetime - 1
- Showtime - 1
