= Black Reel Award for Outstanding Actress =

Award presented annually by the Black Reel Awards

- Awarded for: Outstanding Actress
- Country: United States
- Presented by: Black Reel Awards (BRAs)
- First award: 2000
- Final award: 2023
- Final winner: Danielle Deadwyler; Till

Highlights
- Most awards: Viola Davis & Sanaa Lathan (2)
- Most nominations: Viola Davis (6)
- Website: blackreelawards.com

This article lists the winners and nominees for the Black Reel Award for Outstanding Actress in a Motion Picture. The award recognize an actress who has delivered an outstanding performance in a leading role within the given eligible period.

Nia Long received the first award for The Best Man at the 1st Annual Black Reel Awards in 2000. Since its inception, the award has been given out to 21 actresses. With 6 nominations, Viola Davis hold the record for most nominations and tied with Sanaa Lathan for most wins with 2. Rosario Dawson is the most nominated actress in this category without a win. Gugu Mbatha-Raw is the only actress to earn multiple nominations in the same year for Belle & Beyond the Lights at the 14th Annual Black Reel Awards.

At age 9, Quvenzhané Wallis became the youngest actress to win this award for Beasts of the Southern Wild and at age 69, Irma P. Hall became the oldest winner in this category for The Ladykillers.

The award was discontinued at the 24th Black Reel Awards and merged with Outstanding Actor in favor of a single gender-neutral award, Outstanding Lead Performance.

== Winners and nominees ==
Winners are listed first and highlighted in bold.

=== 2000s ===
| Year | Actress | Film | Ref |
|---|---|---|---|
2000
| 2000 | **Nia Long** | **The Best Man** | |
| 2000 | Rosario Dawson | Light It Up | |
| 2000 | Thandiwe Newton | Besieged | |
| 2000 | Rosie Perez | The 24 Hour Woman | |
| 2000 | Malinda Williams | The Wood | |
2001
| 2001 | **Sanaa Lathan** | **Love & Basketball** | |
| 2001 | Angela Bassett | Boesman and Lena | |
| 2001 | Jada Pinkett Smith | Bamboozled | |
| 2001 | Michelle Rodriguez | Girlfight | |
| 2001 | Alfre Woodard | What's Cooking | |
2002
| 2002 | **Halle Berry** | **Monster's Ball** | |
| 2002 | Vivica A. Fox | Two Can Play That Game | |
| 2002 | Pam Grier | Bones | |
| 2002 | Taraji P. Henson | Baby Boy | |
| 2002 | Regina King | Down to Earth | |
2003
| 2003 | **Angela Bassett** | **Sunshine State** | |
| 2003 | Kimberly Elise | John Q | |
| 2003 | Aunjanue Ellis | Undercover Brother | |
| 2003 | Sanaa Lathan | Brown Sugar | |
| 2003 | Thandiwe Newton | The Truth About Charlie | |
2004
| 2004 | **Sanaa Lathan** | **Out of Time** | |
| 2004 | Halle Berry | Gothika | |
| 2004 | Beyoncé | The Fighting Temptations | |
| 2004 | Queen Latifah | Bringing Down the House | |
| 2004 | Gabrielle Union | Deliver Us from Eva | |
| 2005 | Drama | | |
| 2005 | **Sophie Okonedo** | **Hotel Rwanda** | |
| 2005 | Regina King | Ray | |
| 2005 | Kerry Washington | Ray | |
| 2005 | Comedy / Musical | | |
| 2005 | **Irma P. Hall** | **The Ladykillers** | |
| 2005 | Angela Bassett | Mr. 3000 | |
| 2005 | Gabrielle Union | Breakin' All the Rules | |
2006
| 2006 | **Kimberly Elise** | **Diary of a Mad Black Woman** | |
| 2006 | Rosario Dawson | Rent | |
| 2006 | Nona Gaye | The Gospel | |
| 2006 | Queen Latifah | Last Holiday | |
| 2006 | Zoe Saldaña | Guess Who | |
2007
| 2007 | **Keke Palmer** | **Akeelah and the Bee** | |
| 2007 | Beyoncé | Dreamgirls | |
| 2007 | Sanaa Lathan | Something New | |
2008
| 2008 | **Queen Latifah** | **The Secret Life of Bees** | |
| 2008 | Jennifer Hudson | The Secret Life of Bees | |
| 2008 | Sanaa Lathan | The Family That Preys | |
| 2008 | Keke Palmer | The Longshots | |
| 2008 | Alfre Woodard | The Family That Preys | |

=== 2010s ===
| Year | Actress | Film | Ref |
|---|---|---|---|
2010
| 2010 | **Gabourey Sidibe** | **Precious** | |
| 2010 | Nicole Beharie | American Violet | |
| 2010 | Taraji P. Henson | I Can Do Bad All By Myself | |
| 2010 | Sophie Okonedo | Skin | |
| 2010 | Maya Rudolph | Away We Go | |
2011
| 2011 | **Kerry Washington** | **Night Catches Us** | |
| 2011 | Kimberly Elise | For Colored Girls | |
| 2011 | Queen Latifah | Just Wright | |
| 2011 | Thandiwe Newton | For Colored Girls | |
| 2011 | Anika Noni Rose | For Colored Girls | |
2012
| 2012 | **Viola Davis** | **The Help** | |
| 2012 | Naomie Harris | The First Grader | |
| 2012 | Nia Long | Mooz-lum | |
| 2012 | Adepero Oduye | Pariah | |
| 2012 | Zoe Saldaña | Colombiana | |
2013
| 2013 | **Quvenzhané Wallis** | **Beasts of the Southern Wild** | |
| 2013 | Halle Berry | Cloud Atlas | |
| 2013 | Emayatzy Corinealdi | Middle of Nowhere | |
| 2013 | Viola Davis | Won't Back Down | |
| 2013 | Rashida Jones | Celeste and Jesse Forever | |
2014
| 2014 | **Danai Gurira** | **Mother of George** | |
| 2014 | Halle Berry | The Call | |
| 2014 | Rosario Dawson | Trance | |
| 2014 | Lisagay Hamilton | Go for Sisters | |
| 2014 | Nia Long | The Best Man Holiday | |
2015
| 2015 | **Gugu Mbatha-Raw** | **Belle** | |
| 2015 | Rosario Dawson | Top Five | |
| 2015 | Gugu Mbatha-Raw | Beyond the Lights | |
| 2015 | Tessa Thompson | Dear White People | |
| 2015 | Quvenzhané Wallis | Annie | |
2016
| 2016 | **Teyonah Parris** | **Chi-Raq** | |
| 2016 | Viola Davis | Lila & Eve | |
| 2016 | Kitana Kiki Rodriguez | Tangerine | |
| 2016 | Zoe Saldaña | Infinitely Polar Bear | |
| 2016 | Karidja Touré | Girlhood | |
2017
| 2017 | **Ruth Negga** | **Loving** | |
| 2017 | Taraji P. Henson | Hidden Figures | |
| 2017 | Royalty Hightower | The Fits | |
| 2017 | Sasha Lane | American Honey | |
| 2017 | Madina Nwalanga | Queen of Katwe | |
2018
| 2018 | **Natalie Paul** | **Crown Heights** | |
| 2018 | Amandla Stenberg | Everything, Everything | |
| 2018 | Carmen Ejogo | It Comes at Night | |
| 2018 | Jessica Williams | The Incredible Jessica James | |
| 2018 | Simone Baker | Gook | |
2019
| 2019 | **KiKi Layne** | **If Beale Street Could Talk** | |
| 2019 | Viola Davis | Widows | |
| 2019 | Regina Hall | Support the Girls | |
| 2019 | Amandla Stenberg | The Hate U Give | |
| 2019 | Zoe Renee | Jinn | |

=== 2020s ===
| Year | Actress | Film | Ref |
|---|---|---|---|
2020
| 2020 | **Lupita Nyong’o** | **Us** | |
| 2020 | Cynthia Erivo | Harriet | |
| 2020 | Jodie Turner-Smith | Queen & Slim | |
| 2020 | Gugu Mbatha-Raw | Fast Color | |
| 2020 | Alfre Woodard | Clemency | |
2021
| 2021 | **Viola Davis** | **Ma Rainey's Black Bottom** | |
| 2021 | Nicole Beharie | Miss Juneteenth | |
| 2021 | Andra Day | The United States vs. Billie Holiday | |
| 2021 | Tessa Thompson | Sylvie's Love | |
| 2021 | Zendaya | Malcolm & Marie | |
2022
| 2022 | **Tessa Thompson** | **Passing** | |
| 2022 | Zazie Beetz | The Harder They Fall | |
| 2022 | Halle Berry | Bruised | |
| 2022 | Jennifer Hudson | Respect | |
| 2022 | Taylour Paige | Zola | |
2023
| 2023 | **Danielle Deadwyler** | **Till** | |
| 2023 | Viola Davis | The Woman King | |
| 2023 | Anna Diop | Nanny | |
| 2023 | Regina Hall | Honk for Jesus. Save Your Soul. | |
| 2023 | Letitia Wright | Black Panther: Wakanda Forever | |

== Multiple nominations and wins ==
=== Multiple wins ===
2 Wins

- Viola Davis
- Sanaa Lathan

=== Multiple nominations ===
6 Nominations

- Viola Davis

5 Nominations

- Halle Berry
- Sanaa Lathan

4 Nominations

- Rosario Dawson
- Queen Latifah

3 Nominations

- Angela Bassett
- Kimberly Elise
- Taraji P. Henson
- Nia Long
- Gugu Mbatha-Raw
- Thandiwe Newton
- Zoe Saldaña
- Tessa Thompson
- Alfre Woodard

2 Nominations

- Nicole Beharie
- Beyoncé
- Regina Hall
- Jennifer Hudson
- Regina King
- Sophie Okonedo
- Keke Palmer
- Amandla Stenberg
- Gabrielle Union
- Quvenzhané Wallis
- Kerry Washington

== Multiple nominations from the same film ==
- Kerry Washington and Regina King in Ray (2005)
- Queen Latifah (winner) and Jennifer Hudson in The Secret Life of Bees (2008)
- Sanaa Lathan and Alfre Woodard in The Family That Preys (2008)
- Kimberly Elise, Thandiwe Newton & Anika Noni Rose in For Colored Girls (2011)

== Age superlatives ==
| Record | Actress | Film | Age (in years) |
|---|---|---|---|
| Oldest winner | Irma P. Hall | The Ladykillers | 69 |
| Oldest nominee | Irma P. Hall | The Ladykillers | 69 |
| Youngest winner | Quvenzhané Wallis | Beasts of the Southern Wild | 9 |
| Youngest nominee | Quvenzhané Wallis | Beasts of the Southern Wild | 9 |
