= 14th Annual Black Reel Awards =

Film-industry awards in 2014

14th Black Reel Awards
- Date: February 13, 2014
- Location: Washington, D.C.
- Website: http://blackreelawards.wordpress.com

The 2014 Black Reel Awards, which annually recognize and celebrate the achievements of black people in feature, independent and television films, were announced on Thursday, February 13, 2014. Fruitvale Station, The Butler and 12 Years a Slave lead the film nominees with 9 nominations apiece. Pastor Brown, The Watsons Go to Birmingham and Being Mary Jane lead the television nominees with 6 nominations. This year saw the Breakthrough Performance category split between genders bringing this years total categories to 26.

12 Years a Slave made Black Reel Awards history by winning 8 awards including Outstanding Motion Picture. Multiple winning films included: Captain Phillips and 20 Feet from Stardom. On the television side, Mike Tyson: Undisputed Truth and Being Mary Jane tied for the most wins with two.

Multiple winners included: Steve McQueen, Lupita Nyong'o, Barkhad Abdi and Chiwetel Ejiofor.

== Winners and nominees ==
Winners are listed first and highlighted in bold.

Best Film	Best Director
**12 Years a Slave**; 42; The Butler; Fruitvale Station; Mandela: Long Walk to Freedom	**Steve McQueen – 12 Years a Slave**; Ryan Coogler – Fruitvale Station; Lee Daniels – The Butler; Malcolm D. Lee – The Best Man Holiday; George Tillman Jr. – The Inevitable Defeat of Mister and Pete
Best Actor	Best Actress
**Chiwetel Ejiofor – 12 Years a Slave**; Idris Elba – Mandela: Long Walk to Freedom; Michael B. Jordan – Fruitvale Station; Isaiah Washington – Blue Caprice; Forest Whitaker – The Butler	**Danai Gurira – Mother of George**; Halle Berry – The Call; Rosario Dawson – Trance; LisaGay Hamilton – Go for Sisters; Nia Long – The Best Man Holiday
Best Supporting Actor	Best Supporting Actress
**Barkhad Abdi – Captain Phillips**; David Oyelowo – The Butler; Nate Parker – Ain't Them Bodies Saints; Tequan Richmond – Blue Caprice; Lakeith Stanfield – Short Term 12	**Lupita Nyong'o – 12 Years a Slave**; Melonie Diaz – Fruitvale Station; Naomie Harris – Mandela: Long Walk to Freedom; Octavia Spencer – Fruitvale Station; Oprah Winfrey – The Butler
Best Breakthrough Performance, Male	Best Breakthrough Performance, Female
**Barkhad Abdi – Captain Phillips**; Chadwick Boseman – 42; Skylan Brooks – The Inevitable Defeat of Mister and Pete; Tequan Richmond – Blue Caprice; Lakeith Stanfield – Short Term 12	**Lupita Nyong'o – 12 Years a Slave**; Melonie Diaz – Fruitvale Station; Danai Gurira – Mother of George; Lindiwe Matshikiza – Mandela: Long Walk to Freedom; Tashiana Washington – Gimme the Loot
Best Ensemble (Awarded to Casting Directors)	Best Screenplay, Adapted or Original
**Francine Maisler – 12 Years a Slave**; Leah Daniels and Billy Hopkins – The Butler; Nina Henninger – Fruitvale Station; Julie Hutchinson – The Best Man Holiday; Victoria Thomas – 42	**John Ridley – 12 Years a Slave**; Ryan Coogler – Fruitvale Station; Malcolm D. Lee – The Best Man Holiday; Kasi Lemmons – Black Nativity; Michael Starrbury – The Inevitable Defeat of Mister and Pete
Best Feature Documentary	Best Voice Performance
**20 Feet from Stardom – Gil Friesen and Caitrin Rogers**; Free Angela and all Political Prisoners – Jay Z, Will Smith and Jada Pinkett Smith; God Loves Uganda – Roger Ross Williams; The Trials of Muhammad Ali – Bill Siegel; Venus and Serena – Maiken Baird and Michelle Major	**Samuel L. Jackson – Turbo**; Beyoncé – Epic; Keith David – Free Birds; Snoop Dogg – Turbo; Maya Rudolph – Turbo
Best Independent Feature	Best Independent Documentary
**Blue Caprice – Alexandre Moors**; Mother of George – Andrew Dosunmu; Things Never Said – Charles Murray; An Oversimplification of Her Beauty – Terence Nance; Go for Sisters – John Sayles	**The New Black – Yoruba Richen**; Africa: The Beat – Javier Arias Bal, Polo Vallejo and Manuel Velasco; I Want My Name Back – Roger Paradiso; Lenny Cooke – Benny and Joshua Safdie; Unheard: Black Women in Civil Rights – Nev Nnaji
Best Independent Short	Best Foreign Film
**Black Girl in Paris – Kiandra Parks**; A Different Tree – Steven Caple Jr.; African Cowboy – Rodney Charles; Sweet Honey Chile – Talibah Newman; They Die by the Dawn – Jeymes Samuel	**War Witch (Canada) – Kim Nguyen**; Better Mus' Come (Jamaica) – Storm Saulter; Home Again (Canada) – Sudz Sutherland; Nairobi Half Life (Kenya) – David Gitonga; Storage 24 (U.K.) – Johannes Roberts
Best Original or Adapted Song	Outstanding Original Score
**"Desperation" from 20 Feet from Stardom – Performed by Judith Hill**; "Happy" from Despicable Me 2 – Performed by Pharrell Williams; "In the Middle of the Night" from The Butler – Performed by Fantasia; "Queen of the Field (Patsey's Song)" from 12 Years a Slave – Performed by Alicia Keys; "You and I Ain't Nothin' No More" from The Butler – Performed by Gladys Knight	**Hans Zimmer – 12 Years a Slave**; Stanley Clarke – The Best Man Holiday; Ludwig Göransson – Fruitvale Station; Mark Isham – 42; Rodrigo Leao – The Butler
Best Television Miniseries or Movie	Outstanding Director in a Television Miniseries or Movie
**Mike Tyson: Undisputed Truth (HBO) – Spike Lee and Mike Tyson**; Being Mary Jane (BET) – Gabrielle Union, Salim Akil and Mara Brock Akil; Betty and Coretta (Lifetime) – Polly Anthony and Jaja Johnson; CrazySexyCool: The TLC Story (VH1) – Bill Diggins and Jill Holmes; The Watsons Go to Birmingham (Hallmark) – Tonya Lewis Lee	**Spike Lee – Mike Tyson: Undisputed Truth (HBO)**; Salim Akil – Being Mary Jane (BET); Rockmond Dunbar – Pastor Brown (Lifetime); Kenny Leon – The Watsons Go to Birmingham (Hallmark); Charles Stone III – CrazySexyCool: The TLC Story (VH1)
Best Actor in a TV Movie or Limited Series	Best Actress in a TV Movie or Limited Series
**Chiwetel Ejiofor – Dancing on the Edge (Starz)**; Keith David – Pastor Brown (Lifetime); Omari Hardwick – A Christmas Blessing (TV One); Ernie Hudson – Pastor Brown (Lifetime); Mike Tyson – Mike Tyson: Undisputed Truth (HBO)	**Anika Noni Rose – The Watsons Go to Birmingham (Hallmark)**; Angela Bassett – Betty and Coretta (Lifetime); Keke Palmer – CrazySexyCool: The TLC Story (VH1); Salli Richardson-Whitfield – Pastor Brown (Lifetime); Gabrielle Union – Being Mary Jane (BET)
Best Supporting Actor in a TV Movie or Limited Series	Best Supporting Actress in a TV Movie or Limited Series
**Omari Hardwick – Being Mary Jane (BET)**; Richard Brooks – Being Mary Jane (BET); Danny Glover – Muhammad Ali's Greatest Fight (HBO); Wood Harris – The Watsons Go to Birmingham (Hallmark); Ernie Hudson – Call Me Crazy: A Five Film (Lifetime)	**Octavia Spencer – Call Me Crazy: A Five Film (Lifetime)**; Loretta Devine – Saving Westbrook High (UP); Audra McDonald – The Sound of Music Live! (NBC); Nicole Ari Parker – Pastor Brown (Lifetime); LaTanya Richardson – The Watsons Go to Birmingham (Hallmark)
Outstanding Screenplay in a TV Movie or Limited Series	Best Television Documentary or Special
**Mara Brock Akil – Being Mary Jane (BET)**; Rhonda Baraka – Pastor Brown (Lifetime); Caliope Brattlestreet, Stephen Glantz and Tonya Lewis Lee – The Watsons Go to Birmingham (Hallmark); Kate Lanier – CrazySexyCool: The TLC Story (VH1); Kiki Tyson – Mike Tyson: Undisputed Truth (HBO)	**Whoopi Goldberg – Whoopi Goldberg Presents Moms Mabley (HBO)**; D. Channsin Berry and Bill Duke– Dark Girls (OWN); Ava DuVernay – Venus vs. (ESPN); Ron Howard – Made in America (Showtime); Bob Smeaton – Jimi Hendrix: Hear My Train a Comin' (PBS)
