= Black Reel Award for Outstanding Film Poster =

Annual US film award

This page lists the winners and nominees for the Black Reel Award for Outstanding Film Poster. This category was retired during the 2004 ceremony.

== Winners and nominees ==
Winners are listed first and highlighted in bold.

=== 2000s ===
Year	Film	Ref
2001
2001	**Love & Basketball**	
2001	Bamboozled	
2001	Ghost Dog: The Way of the Samurai	
2001	Requiem for a Dream	
2001	Unbreakable	
2002
2002	**Training Day**	
2002	Ali	
2002	Baby Boy	
2002	The Brothers	
2002	The Caveman's Valentine	
2003
2003	**Blade II**	
2003	Changing Lanes	
2003	Queen of the Damned	
2003	Standing in the Shadows of Motown	
2003	Undercover Brother	
