= Black Reel Award for Outstanding Actor =

Award presented annually by the Black Reel Awards

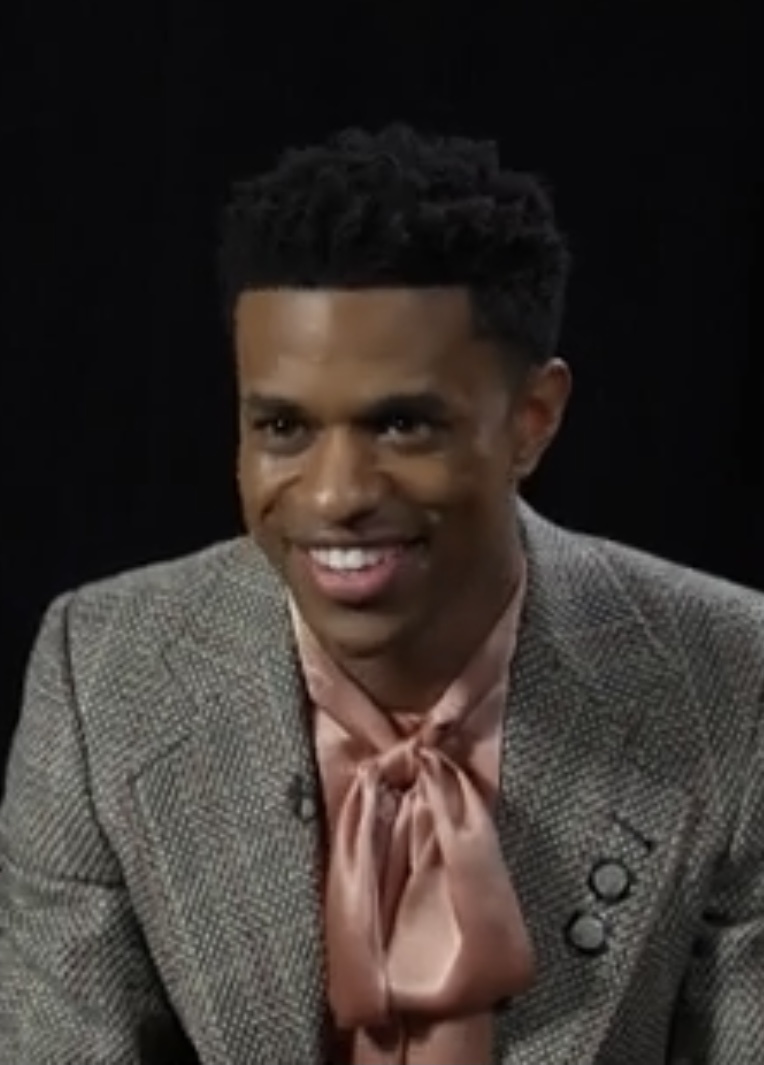
- The 2023 recipient: Jeremy Pope
- Awarded for: Outstanding Actor
- Country: United States
- Presented by: Black Reel Awards (BRAs)
- First award: 2000
- Final award: 2023
- Final winner: Jeremy Pope; The Inspection

Highlights
- Most awards: Denzel Washington (5)
- Most nominations: Denzel Washington (15)
- Website: blackreelawards.com

This article lists the winners and nominees for the Black Reel Award for Outstanding Actor in a Motion Picture. The award recognized an actor who delivered an outstanding performance in a leading role within the given eligible period.

Denzel Washington received the first award for The Hurricane at the 1st Annual Black Reel Award. Since its inception, the award has been given out to 17 actors. Denzel Washington holds the record for most wins and nominations in this category with 5 wins and 15 nominations, respectively. Other multiple winners include Chiwetel Ejiofor & Chadwick Boseman. Washington also became the first person to earn multiple nominations in the same year for The Book of Eli & Unstoppable at the 11th Annual Black Reel Awards. Samuel L. Jackson & Don Cheadle are tied as the most nominated actors in this category without a win.

At the 21st Annual Black Reel Awards, Chadwick Boseman became the first posthumous acting winner in Black Reel Awards History for his performance in Ma Rainey's Black Bottom. At age 18, Dev Patel became the youngest actor to win this award for Slumdog Millionaire and at age 72, Morgan Freeman became the oldest winner in this category for Invictus.

The award was discontinued at the 24th Black Reel Awards and merged with Outstanding Actress in favor of a single gender-neutral award, Outstanding Lead Performance.

== Winners and nominees ==
Winners are listed first and highlighted in bold.

=== 2000s ===
Year	Actor	Film	Ref
2000
2000	**Denzel Washington**	**The Hurricane**	
2000	Taye Diggs	The Best Man	
2000	Laurence Fishburne	The Matrix	
2000	Eddie Murphy	Bowfinger	
2000	Sean Nelson	The Wood	
2001
2001	**Denzel Washington**	**Remember the Titans**	
2001	Omar Epps	Love and Basketball	
2001	Morgan Freeman	Nurse Betty	
2001	Cuba Gooding Jr.	Men of Honor	
2001	Samuel L. Jackson	Shaft	
2002
2002	**Denzel Washington**	**Training Day**	
2002	Vin Diesel	The Fast and the Furious	
2002	Tyrese Gibson	Baby Boy	
2002	Samuel L. Jackson	The Caveman's Valentine	
2002	Will Smith	Ali	
2003
2003	**Derek Luke**	**Antwone Fisher**	
2003	Ice Cube	Barbershop	
2003	Samuel L. Jackson	Changing Lanes	
2003	Wesley Snipes	Undisputed	
2003	Denzel Washington	John Q	
2004
2004	**Chiwetel Ejiofor**	**Dirty Pretty Things**	
2004	Cuba Gooding Jr.	Radio	
2004	LL Cool J	Deliver Us from Eva	
2004	Wentworth Miller	The Human Stain	
2004	Denzel Washington	Out of Time	
2005	Drama		
2005	**Jamie Foxx**	**Ray**	
2005	Don Cheadle	Hotel Rwanda	
2005	Mario Van Peebles	BAADASSSSS!	
2005	Comedy / Musical		
2005	**Bernie Mac**	**Mr. 3000**	
2005	Jamie Foxx	Breakin' All the Rules	
2005	Ice Cube	Barbershop 2: Back in Business	
2006
2006	**Terrence Howard**	**Hustle & Flow**	
2006	Don Cheadle	Crash	
2006	Idris Elba	The Gospel	
2006	Samuel L. Jackson	Coach Carter	
2006	Will Smith	Hitch	
2007
2007	**Forest Whitaker**	**The Last King of Scotland**	
2007	Jamie Foxx	Dreamgirls	
2007	Derek Luke	Catch a Fire	
2007	Will Smith	The Pursuit of Happyness	
2007	Denzel Washington	Inside Man	
2008
2008	**Dev Patel**	**Slumdog Millionaire**	
2008	Don Cheadle	Traitor	
2008	Mos Def	Be Kind Rewind	
2008	Chiwetel Ejiofor	Redbelt	
2008	Derek Luke	Miracle at St. Anna	

=== 2010s ===
Year	Actor	Film	Ref
2010
2010	**Morgan Freeman**	**Invictus**	
2010	Quinton Aaron	The Blind Side	
2010	Jamie Foxx	The Soloist	
2010	Souléymane Sy Savané	Goodbye Solo	
2010	Denzel Washington	The Taking of Pelham 123	
2011
2011	**Anthony Mackie**	**Night Catches Us**	
2011	Don Cheadle	Brooklyn's Finest	
2011	Jaden Smith	The Karate Kid	
2011	Denzel Washington	The Book of Eli	
2011	Denzel Washington	Unstoppable	
2012
2012	**John Boyega**	**Attack the Block**	
2012	Laz Alonso	Jumping the Broom	
2012	Demián Bichir	A Better Life	
2012	Oliver Litundo	The First Grader	
2012	Evan Ross	Mooz-lum	
2013
2013	**Denzel Washington**	**Flight**	
2013	Jamie Foxx	Django Unchained	
2013	Nate Parker	Red Tails	
2013	Chris Rock	2 Days in New York	
2013	Omar Sy	The Intouchables	
2014
2014	**Chiwetel Ejiofor**	**12 Years a Slave**	
2014	Idris Elba	Mandela: Long Walk to Freedom	
2014	Michael B. Jordan	Fruitvale Station	
2014	Isaiah Washington	Blue Caprice	
2014	Forest Whitaker	The Butler	
2015
2015	**David Oyelowo**	**Selma**	
2015	Chadwick Boseman	Get on Up	
2015	Nate Parker	Beyond the Lights	
2015	Chris Rock	Top Five	
2015	Denzel Washington	The Equalizer	
2016
2016	**Michael B. Jordan**	**Creed**	
2016	Abraham Attah	Beasts of No Nation	
2016	Chiwetel Ejiofor	Z for Zachariah	
2016	Samuel L. Jackson	The Hateful Eight	
2016	Will Smith	Concussion	
2017
2017	**Denzel Washington**	**Fences**	
2017	Don Cheadle	Miles Ahead	
2017	Nate Parker	The Birth of a Nation	
2017	Parker Sawyers	Southside with You	
2017	Denzel Washington	The Magnificent Seven	
2018
2018	**Daniel Kaluuya**	**Get Out**	
2018	Chadwick Boseman	Marshall	
2018	Algee Smith	Detroit	
2018	Lakeith Stanfield	Crown Heights	
2018	Denzel Washington	Roman J. Israel, Esq.	
2019
2019	**Chadwick Boseman**	**Black Panther**	
2019	John David Washington	BlacKkKlansman	
2019	Stephan James	If Beale Street Could Talk	
2019	Lakeith Stanfield	Sorry to Bother You	
2019	Michael B. Jordan	Creed II	

=== 2020s ===
Year	Actor	Film	Ref
2020
2020	**Eddie Murphy**	**Dolemite Is My Name**	
2020	Jimmie Fails	The Last Black Man in San Francisco	
2020	Daniel Kaluuya	Queen & Slim	
2020	Kelvin Harrison Jr.	Waves	
2020	Kelvin Harrison Jr.	Luce	
2021
2021	**Chadwick Boseman** **(posthumous)**	**Ma Rainey's Black Bottom**	
2021	Kingsley Ben-Adir	One Night in Miami...	
2021	Delroy Lindo	Da 5 Bloods	
2021	Rob Morgan	Bull	
2021	Lakeith Stanfield	Judas and the Black Messiah	
2022
2022	**Will Smith**	**King Richard**	
2022	Mahershala Ali	Swan Song	
2022	Winston Duke	Nine Days	
2022	Jonathan Majors	The Harder They Fall	
2022	Denzel Washington	The Tragedy of Macbeth	
2023
2023	**Jeremy Pope**	**The Inspection**	
2023	John Boyega	Breaking	
2023	Sterling K. Brown	Honk for Jesus. Save Your Soul.	
2023	Daniel Kaluuya	Nope	
2023	Jonathan Majors	Devotion	

== Multiple nominations and wins ==
=== Multiple wins ===
5 Wins

- Denzel Washington

2 Wins

- Chadwick Boseman
- Chiwetel Ejiofor

=== Multiple nominations ===
15 Nominations

- Denzel Washington

5 Nominations

- Don Cheadle
- Jamie Foxx
- Samuel L. Jackson
- Will Smith

4 Nominations

- Chadwick Boseman
- Chiwetel Ejiofor

3 Nominations

- Derek Luke
- Michael B. Jordan
- Daniel Kaluuya
- Nate Parker
- LaKeith Stanfield

2 Nominations

- John Boyega
- Chris Rock
- Cuba Gooding Jr.
- Kelvin Harrison Jr.
- Jonathan Majors
- Eddie Murphy
- Forest Whitaker
- Ice Cube
- Idris Elba
- Morgan Freeman

== Age superlatives ==
Record	Actor	Film	Age (in years)
Oldest winner	Morgan Freeman	Invictus	72
Oldest nominee	Morgan Freeman	Invictus	72
Youngest winner	Dev Patel	Slumdog Millionaire	18
Youngest nominee	Jaden Smith	The Karate Kid	12
