= 2nd Annual Black Reel Awards =

Film-industry awards in 2001

2nd Black Reel Awards
- Date: February 12, 2001
- Location: Washington, D.C.

The 2001 Black Reel Awards, which annually recognize and celebrate the achievements of black people in feature, independent and television films, took place in Washington, D.C., on February 12, 2001. Love & Basketball swept the awards, picking up six trophies during the evening. The Corner followed very closely behind with five awards.

== Winners and nominees ==
Winners are listed first and highlighted in bold.

Best Film	Best Director
**Love & Basketball**; Bamboozled; Girlfight; Loving Jezebel; Men of Honor; Remember the Titans	**Gina Prince-Bythewood – Love & Basketball**; Kwyn Bader – Loving Jezebel; Albert Hughes and Allen Hughes – American Pimp; Spike Lee – Bamboozled; John Singleton – Shaft
Best Actor	Best Actress
**Denzel Washington – Remember the Titans**; Omar Epps – Love & Basketball; Morgan Freeman – Nurse Betty; Cuba Gooding Jr. – Men of Honor; Samuel L. Jackson – Shaft	**Sanaa Lathan – Love & Basketball**; Angela Bassett – Boesman and Lena; Jada Pinkett Smith – Bamboozled; Michelle Rodriguez – Girlfight; Alfre Woodard – What's Cooking?
Best Supporting Actor	Best Supporting Actress
**Don Cheadle – Traffic**; Rob Brown – Finding Forrester; Tommy Davidson – Bamboozled; Chris Rock – Nurse Betty; Marlon Wayans – Requiem of a Dream	**Gabrielle Union – Bring It On**; Lisa Bonet – High Fidelity; Eartha Kitt – The Emperor's New Groove; Nia Long – Boiler Room; Sheryl Lee Ralph – Deterrence
Best Screenplay, Adapted or Original	Best Film Poster
**Gregory Allen Howard – Remember the Titans**; Kwyn Bader – Loving Jezebel; Spike Lee – Bamboozled; Scott Marshall Smith – Men of Honor; Gina Prince-Bythewood – Love & Basketball	**Love & Basketball**; Bamboozled; Ghost Dog: The Way of the Samurai; Requiem for a Dream; Unbreakable
Outstanding Original Soundtrack	Best Original or Adapted Song
**Love & Basketball**; Backstage; Bamboozled; Ghost Dog: The Way of the Samurai; The Ladies Man	**"Fool of Me" from Love & Basketball – Performed by Meshell Ndegeocello**; "Dance Tonight" from Love & Basketball – Performed by Lucy Pearl; "I'll Go" from Love & Basketball – Performed by Donell Jones; "Independent Women Part I" from Charlie's Angels – Performed by Destiny's Child; "Doesn't Really Matter" from Nutty Professor II: The Klumps – Performed by Janet Jackson
Outstanding Television Movie or Limited Series	Outstanding Director in a Television Miniseries or Movie
**The Corner (HBO) – Nina Kostroff Noble**; Disappearing Acts (HBO) – Lydia Dean Pilcher; Freedom Song (TNT) – Amanda DiGiulio; Holiday Heart (Showtime) – Cheryl West; Sally Hemings: American Scandal (PBS) – Marty Eli Schwartz and Gerrit van der Meer	**Charles S. Dutton – The Corner (HBO)**; Jeffrey W. Byrd – Seventeen Again (Showtime); Julie Dash – Love Song (MTV); Gina Prince-Bythewood – Disappearing Acts (HBO); Robert Townsend – Holiday Heart (Showtime)
Best Actor in a TV Movie or Limited Series	Best Actress in a TV Movie or Limited Series
**T. K. Carter – The Corner (HBO)**; Leon – Little Richard (NBC); Sean Nelson – The Corner (HBO); Ving Rhames – Holiday Heart (Showtime); Wesley Snipes – Disappearing Acts (HBO)	**Khandi Alexander – The Corner (HBO)**; Carmen Ejogo – Sally Hemings: American Scandal (PBS); Sanaa Lathan – Disappearing Acts (HBO); Regina Taylor – Cora Unashamed (PBS); Alfre Woodard – Holiday Heart (Showtime)
Best Supporting Actor in a TV Movie or Limited Series	Best Supporting Actress in a TV Movie or Limited Series
**Glenn Plummer – The Corner (HBO)**; Adewale Akinnuoye-Agbaje – Enslavement: The True Story of Fanny Kemble (Showtime); Vondie Curtis-Hall – Freedom Song (TNT); Vicellous Reon Shannon – Freedom Song (TNT); Mykelti Williamson – Holiday Heart (Showtime)	**Diahann Carroll – Sally Hemings: American Scandal (PBS)**; Lisa Arrindell Anderson – Disappearing Acts (HBO); Kim Fields – Hidden Blessings (BET); Regina Hall – Disappearing Acts (HBO); Jesika Reynolds – Holiday Heart (Showtime)
Outstanding Screenplay in a TV Movie or Limited Series
**David Simon and David Mills – The Corner (HBO)**; Tina Andrews – Sally Hemings: American Scandal (PBS); Lisa Jones and Terry McMillan – Disappearing Acts (HBO); Stewart St. John – Seventeen Again (Showtime); Cheryl West – Holiday Heart (Showtime)
