= The Family That Preys =

- Theatrical release poster
- Directed by: Tyler Perry
- Written by: Tyler Perry
- Produced by: Tyler Perry; Reuben Cannon
- Starring: Alfre Woodard; Sanaa Lathan; KaDee Strickland; Rockmond Dunbar; Cole Hauser; Robin Givens; Taraji P. Henson; Tyler Perry; Kathy Bates
- Cinematography: Toyomichi Kurita
- Edited by: Maysie Hoy
- Music by: Aaron Zigman
- Production companies: Tyler Perry Studios; Reuben Cannon Productions
- Distributed by: Lionsgate
- Release date: September 12, 2008 (United States)
- Running time: 106 minutes
- Country: United States
- Language: English
- Box office: $37.1 million

The Family That Preys is a 2008 American comedy drama film written, co-produced and directed by Tyler Perry. The screenplay focuses on two families, one wealthy and the other working class, whose lives are intertwined in both love and business. The film stars Alfre Woodard, Sanaa Lathan, Rockmond Dunbar, KaDee Strickland, Cole Hauser, Taraji P. Henson, Robin Givens, Perry himself in a role and Kathy Bates.

== Plot ==
Socialite Charlotte Cartwright hosts the wedding of Andrea—the daughter of her best friend, Alice Evans—and construction worker Chris Bennett. Charlotte's son, William, and his wife, Jillian, have eloped rather than let Charlotte plan an elaborate reception.

Four years later, Andrea's sister, Pam, is married to Ben and looks after Andrea's three-year-old son for extra income while working at Alice's diner. Andrea does not help their mother financially, but has designer clothes and a new Mercedes. She is in an extramarital affair with William.

Andrea ridicules Chris's dream of opening a construction firm with Ben. Chris is rejected for a bank loan, but discovers Andrea deposited $300,000 in a secret account. She tells Chris the money is bonuses she gets from William, and refuses to finance his business.

William believes his recently-closed $500-million deal will allow him to wrest the family business from Charlotte. Charlotte hires Abby Dexter as COO, and determines the company must front $25 million to make William's deal viable. Charlotte faces selling 10% of her shares to raise the money, leaving her with a minority vote. William tells Abby that his and Charlotte's vote combined will retain Cartwright control; Abby advises Charlotte to sell.

Charlotte takes Alice on a road trip in her vintage convertible, without a set route or schedule. Charlotte introduces Alice to honky-tonks and male strip clubs. Alice takes Charlotte to a communal baptism. Charlotte reveals she has early-onset Alzheimer's disease.

At the company gala, Jillian and Abby discover Andrea and William's affair. William fires Chris and Ben after Chris asks for money to start a new construction business. Abby warns Andrea the affair will likely result in her dismissal; Andrea believes William will protect her. Chris takes the money from the hidden account as marital assets, and pays deposits for a construction firm with Ben.

Charlotte and Alice return. Andrea confronts Chris for taking her $300,000, and admits it was from William, her lover. Chris slaps her. Andrea tells him to keep the money and move out. She says that William is the father of their son.

Charlotte, asked by Jillian for advice, reminds her that she is a woman scorned without a prenuptial agreement, so can divorce or reconcile and be okay either way. Jillian warns Charlotte that William plans to have the board vote her out.

Chris punches William on a job site. Jillian warns Andrea to stay away from her family and says William will not be seeing her again.

Charlotte fires William with the support of the Calvary Company, a silent investor revealed to be Alice. She has been guided financially for years by Nick Blanchett, a former stockbroker who, when fired without cause by William, had lost his wife and custody of their children. Alice fed him at her diner, and he repaid her with investment advice.

Andrea expects William to leave Jillian for her. Instead, he rejects her and drives away, ignoring her claim that he is her son's father. Charlotte takes pills and dies by suicide.

Chris and Ben's firm is a success, while Andrea is guilt-ridden, heartbroken, and unemployed. She lives in a low-rent apartment and relies on voluntary financial support from Chris. Nick buys a house and is revealed to have always been wealthy, he just moved around a lot. William and Jillian reconcile. Alice sells the diner and drives off in the convertible that Charlotte left her, with a photo of her and Charlotte taped to the dashboard.

== Cast ==
- Alfre Woodard as Alice Reynolds-Evans
- Sanaa Lathan as Andrea Evans-Bennett
- KaDee Strickland as Jillian Cartwright
- Cole Hauser as William Cartwright
- Rockmond Dunbar as Chris Bennett
- Taraji P. Henson as Pam Evans
- Robin Givens as Abigail "Abby" Dexter
- Tyler Perry as Ben
- Kathy Bates as Charlotte Cartwright
- Sebastian Siegel as Nicholas "Nick" Blanchett

== Release ==
The film opened in 2,070 theaters in North America on September 12, 2008 and grossed $17.4 million in its opening weekend, ranking #2 at the box office behind Burn After Reading. It eventually earned $37.1 million domestically, making it the second-least successful of Tyler Perry's films ahead of Daddy's Little Girls.

== Reception ==
On Rotten Tomatoes, the film has an approval rating of 54% based on 41 reviews. The website's critics consensus reads: "Tyler Perry's The Family That Preys treads the filmmaker's established terrain of family loyalty and moral uprightness, though the occasionally predictable plot slides forward, aided by an excess of soapy melodrama." Metacritic assigned the film a weighted average score of 49 out of 100, based on 14 critics, indicating "mixed or average reviews". Audiences polled by CinemaScore gave the film an average grade of "A" on an A+ to F scale.

Stephen Holden of The New York Times said:

The suds that cascade through [the film] more than equal the cubic footage from nighttime soaps like Dallas, Dynasty and their offspring. As the movie proceeds, the flow quickens into a surging flood tide of recriminations and reversals in which blows are exchanged, claws bared and tears shed . . . The Family That Preys doesn’t worry about how it gets from A to Z. There is no problem that a miraculous (and preposterous) plot development can’t resolve in two minutes.

The New York Daily News rated the film three out of five stars and commented:

Perry's notoriously overstuffed plots have sometimes been top-heavy, but this movie, like Woody Allen's Hannah and Her Sisters, hangs on an elegant structure that doesn't feel forced. Perry's skills as a director have improved as his casts have gotten better, and he gives the lovely Woodard one of her most satisfying roles . . . By melding the pleasures of 1950s-style melodrama . . . with equal-gender, African-American-aimed plots, Perry has found success in a niche only he now occupies. And by adding Christian tenets and modern issues . . . Perry shows he knows what his audience wants. First and foremost, that's a smart, satisfying movie experience, which Family is.

Claudia Puig of USA Today said the best thing about the film

is the opportunity it affords to watch a pair of veteran actresses still at the top of their game. Alfre Woodard and Kathy Bates play best pals in this soap opera-style story, and the moments each are on-screen are undeniably the movie's best. One senses a rapport and chemistry between the women that transcends the formulaic plot.

Stephen Farber of The Hollywood Reporter observed:

Although this interracial Dynasty isn't always believable—it's a stretch to accept the lifelong friendship of the two matriarchs as well as the last-minute business coup that they engineer—there's plenty of action to keep us engrossed. Perry wears his religious faith lightly . . . and is shrewd enough to balance piety with raucous humor and lots of sinful shenanigans. Perry's filmmaking skills have improved to the level of competence, and he has assembled a dream cast.

Roger Moore of the Orlando Sentinel rated the film two out of five stars and called it Tyler Perry's "most cinematically polished production to date" but also:

yet another example of how the mini-mogul from Atlanta is his own worst enemy, raiding his cupboard of his popular but pandering stage plays and not bothering to script doctor them for the screen. As sophisticated as the filmmaking becomes, Perry's scripts are still painfully unsophisticated grab-bags of melodramatic cliches, tired jokes and sermonizing.

Peter Debruge of Variety said the film "recycles familiar ingredients according to his own unique formula, serving up a lip-smacking, finger-snapping sudser" and added:

Perry has a tendency to overload his features, and The Family That Preys is no exception, reflecting the helmer's view that the emotional roller-coaster of life can whip its passengers from outrage to exhilaration, from belly laughs to tears in an instant, making for an exhausting yet cathartic overall experience. The result seems ideal for [audiences] who don't see too many movies, cramming enough into one film to satisfy them until the next Perry pic comes out.

Monika Fabian of Time Out New York said:

As with Perry’s other films, his Christian moralistic storytelling can be slightly off-putting—but the solid acting and genuinely entertaining story are sure to satisfy fans, and maybe even bring in some converts.

Ken Fox of TV Guide rated the film three out of four stars and said, "Thanks to some first-rate acting from its stars, it ranks among Perry's best."

Tom Becker of DVD Verdict said:

The Family That Preys has that Love Boat kind of watchability and simplicity. Everything runs in a straight line, all endings are inevitable, and emotions and morals are no more complex than a well-timed platitude. The characters are amalgams of recognizable types plunked down in sitcom settings that elicit near-Pavlovian responses of cheers, jeers, and tears. Here and there, Perry throws us a curve ball—an act of physical violence presented as deserved comeuppance or a character's grim and dubiously appropriate endgame—but even these are not jarring enough to derail it. This is film as comfort food, and not the gourmet kind.

Brian Orndorf of DVD Talk said:

Preys is a soap opera in the most unashamed sense, and while this aesthetic has made Perry heaps of coin, his personal screen touch remains some of the worst overall filmmaking around. The new feature is perhaps even more melodramatic than anything that's come before, taking the Andrea/William affair and using it as the inspiration for the cast to arch their eyebrows to assured cramp, flare nostrils in unintentional comedic fury, and bounce impassioned lines of dialogue off each other with medicine ball grace. It's equal parts hilarious and aggravating, with Perry showing little shame as he works the characters into pants-wetting hysteria.

Gregory Kirschling from Entertainment Weekly stated:

Tyler Perry's melodramas have a tendency to skid not only off the counter but out the kitchen and down the hall, too. The Family That Preys, his first film in six months, is all over the place: It's a boardroom/family/couples/road-trip story. Kathy Bates plays the head of an Atlanta construction company where Sanaa Lathan is a snooty exec and her husband (Rockmond Dunbar), for maximum class/race sizzle, is a worker grunt. As usual, the villains, like Lathan, are very bad, and the good guys, like Dunbar, are very noble—until they get mad and clock their wives.

=== Awards ===
At the Black Reel Awards, both Alfre Woodard and Sanaa Lathan were nominated for Best Actress. Also Tyler Perry was nominated for Best Screenplay, Original or Adapted.

Taraji P. Henson won Best Actress at the BET Awards for her role in the film combined with two other performances in Not Easily Broken, and The Curious Case of Benjamin Button.

== Home media ==
The film was released on Blu-ray Disc and DVD on January 13, 2009. It is in anamorphic widescreen format, with audio tracks and subtitles in English and Spanish. Bonus features include deleted scenes, Two Families, Two Legends, which spotlights stars Alfre Woodard and Kathy Bates; Preying in the Big Easy, about filming in New Orleans; Casting the Family, with interviews with the director and cast, and Delving into the Diner, in which production designer Ina Mayhew discusses her concept for the set.
