= Ina Mayhew =

Ina Mayhew is a New York-based production designer known for her work with directors Spike Lee and Tyler Perry.

== Biography ==
She is the daughter of artist Dorothy Zuccarini and painter Richard Mayhew. She studied fine arts at SUNY Purchase and traveled in Africa before completing a technical theater degree at the Parsons School of Design. She was among the 683 individuals invited to join the Motion Picture Academy of Arts and Sciences in 2016.
