= 4th Annual Black Reel Awards =

Film-industry awards in 2003

4th Black Reel Awards
- Date: March 2, 2003
- Location: Washington, D.C.

The 2003 Black Reel Awards, which annually recognize and celebrate the achievements of black people in feature, independent and television films, took place in Washington, D.C., on March 2, 2003. Antwone Fisher took home five awards during the ceremony, with The Rosa Parks Story receiving four awards.

== Winners and nominees ==
Winners are listed first and highlighted in bold.

| Best Film | Best Director |
|---|---|
| **Antwone Fisher**; 25th Hour; Barbershop; Drumline; Standing in the Shadows of Motown | **Denzel Washington – Antwone Fisher**; Malcolm D. Lee – Undercover Brother; Spike Lee – 25th Hour; Charles Stone III – Drumline; Tim Story – Barbershop |
| Best Actor | Best Actress |
| **Derek Luke – Antwone Fisher**; Ice Cube – Barbershop; Samuel L. Jackson – Changing Lanes; Wesley Snipes – Undisputed; Denzel Washington – John Q | **Angela Bassett – Sunshine State**; Kimberly Elise – John Q; Aunjanue Ellis – Undercover Brother; Sanaa Lathan – Brown Sugar; Thandie Newton – The Truth About Charlie |
| Best Supporting Actor | Best Supporting Actress |
| **Dennis Haysbert – Far from Heaven**; Cedric the Entertainer – Barbershop; Morgan Freeman – The Sum of All Fears; Denzel Washington – Antwone Fisher; Forest Whitaker – Panic Room | **Queen Latifah – Chicago**; Halle Berry – Die Another Day; Joy Bryant – Antwone Fisher; Viola Davis – Solaris; Rosario Dawson – 25th Hour |
| Best Screenplay, Adapted or Original | Best Breakthrough Performance |
| **Antwone Fisher – Antwone Fisher**; Mark Brown and Don S. Scott – Barbershop; Michael Elliott – Brown Sugar; Michael Elliott and Jordan Moffet – Like Mike; John Ridley – Undercover Brother | **Derek Luke – Antwone Fisher**; Beyoncé – Austin Powers in Goldmember; Nick Cannon – Drumline; Raven Goodwin – Lovely & Amazing; Lil' Bow Wow – Like Mike |
| Outstanding Original Soundtrack | Best Original or Adapted Song |
| **Standing in the Shadows of Motown**; 8 Mile; Barbershop; Brown Sugar; Undercover Brother | **"Love of My Life (An Ode to Hip-Hop)" from Brown Sugar – Performed by Erykah Badu and Common**; "Basketball" from Like Mike – Performed by Lil' Bow Wow, Fabolous and Jermaine Dupri; "Bring Your Heart" from Brown Sugar – Performed by Angie Stone; "We Got the Funk" from Undercover Brother – Performed by Snoop Dogg, Fred Wesley and Bootsy Collins; "Work It Out" from Austin Powers in Goldmember – Performed by Beyoncé |
| Best Television Miniseries or Movie | Outstanding Director in a Television Miniseries or Movie |
| **The Rosa Parks Story (CBS) – Paris Qualles**; Keep the Faith, Baby (Showtime) – Art Washington; Lift (Showtime) – DeMane Davis | **Robert Townsend – 10,000 Black Men Named George (Showtime)**; Julie Dash – The Rosa Parks Story (CBS); Doug McHenry – Keep the Faith, Baby (Showtime) |
| Best Actor in a TV Movie or Limited Series | Best Actress in a TV Movie or Limited Series |
| **Harry J. Lennix – Keep the Faith, Baby (Showtime)**; Andre Braugher – 10,000 Black Men Named George (Showtime); Ving Rhames – Sins of the Father (FX) | **Angela Bassett – The Rosa Parks Story (CBS)**; Kerry Washington – Lift (Showtime); Vanessa L. Williams – Keep the Faith, Baby (Showtime) |
| Best Supporting Actor in a TV Movie or Limited Series | Best Supporting Actress in a TV Movie or Limited Series |
| **Charles S. Dutton – 10,000 Black Men Named George (Showtime)**; Peter Francis James – The Rosa Parks Story (CBS); Russell Hornsby – Keep the Faith, Baby (Showtime) | **Cicely Tyson – The Rosa Parks Story (CBS)**; Lonette McKee – Lift (Showtime); Vanessa A. Williams – Our America (Showtime) |
| Outstanding Screenplay in a TV Movie or Limited Series | Best Independent Film |
| **Paris Qualles – The Rosa Parks Story (CBS)**; David Isay, LeAlan Jones and Lloyd Newman – Our America (Showtime); Art Washington – Keep the Faith, Baby (Showtime) | **Standing in the Shadows of Motown – Paul Justman**; Biggie & Tupac – Nick Broomfield; Crazy as Hell – Eriq La Salle |
| Outstanding Independent Film Actor | Outstanding Independent Film Actress |
| **Eriq La Salle – Crazy as Hell**; Michael Beach – Crazy as Hell; Mos Def – Civil Brand | **Erika Alexander – 30 Years to Life**; Monica Calhoun – Pandora's Box; Melissa De Sousa – 30 Years to Life |
| Best Original Television Program | Best Film Poster |
| **Jim Brown: All-American**; No other nominees | **Blade II**; Changing Lanes; Queen of the Damned; Standing in the Shadows of Motown; Undercover Brother |
