= Lamb (2015 Ethiopian film) =

2015 film

- Film poster
- Directed by: Yared Zeleke
- Written by: Yared Zeleke
- Produced by: Ama Ampadu; Laurent Lavole; Johannis Rexin; David Hurst; Alan Milligan
- Starring: Rediat Amare
- Cinematography: Josée Deshaies
- Edited by: Véronique Bruque
- Music by: Christophe Chassol
- Distributed by: Haut et Court (France); Neue Visionen Filmverleih (Germany)
- Release dates: 20 May 2015 (Cannes); 30 September 2015 (France)
- Running time: 94 minutes
- Countries: Ethiopia; France; Germany; Norway; Qatar
- Language: Amharic

Lamb is a 2015 Ethiopian drama film directed by Yared Zeleke. It was screened in the Un Certain Regard section at the 2015 Cannes Film Festival. It was the first Ethiopian film to be included in the Official Selection. It was screened in the Contemporary World Cinema section of the 2015 Toronto International Film Festival. The film was selected as the Ethiopian entry for the Best Foreign Language Film at the 88th Academy Awards but it was not nominated.

== Plot ==
An Ethiopian boy whose mother recently died is placed by his father with relatives, together with his sheep. His host wants him to sacrifice his lamb for the upcoming religious feast, and the homesick boy decides to protect his sheep in the hopes of returning to his home village.

== Cast ==
- Rediat Amare as Ephraïm
- Kidist Siyum as Tsion
- Welela Assefa as Emama
- Surafel Teka as Solomon
- Rahel Teshome as Azeb
- Indris Mohamed as Abraham
- Bitania Abraham as Mimi

== Reception ==
Marinell Haegelin wrote for kinoctics.com this film was "part poignant drama, part travelogue". The cast was praised as "endear(ing)".

== See also ==
- List of submissions to the 88th Academy Awards for Best Foreign Language Film
- List of Ethiopian submissions for the Academy Award for Best Foreign Language Film
