= 1st Annual Black Reel Awards =

Film-industry awards in 2000

1st Black Reel Awards
- Date: February 16, 2000
- Location: Washington, D.C.
- Most wins: The Best Man (4) & A Lesson Before Dying (4)
- Most nominations: The Best Man (7)

The 2000 Black Reel Awards, which annually recognize and celebrate the achievements of black people in feature, independent and television films, took place in Washington, D.C., on February 16, 2000. The Best Man and A Lesson Before Dying were the big winners of the night, taking home four awards each.

== Winners and nominees ==
Winners are listed first and highlighted in bold.

Best Film	Best Director
**The Hurricane**; The Best Man; Summer of Sam; Life; The Wood	**Malcolm D. Lee – The Best Man**; Rick Famuyiwa – The Wood; Spike Lee – Summer of Sam
Best Actor	Best Actress
**Denzel Washington – The Hurricane**; Taye Diggs – The Best Man; Laurence Fishburne – The Matrix; Eddie Murphy – Bowfinger; Sean Nelson – The Wood	**Nia Long – The Best Man**; Rosario Dawson – Light It Up; Thandie Newton – Besieged; Rosie Perez – The 24 Hour Woman; Malinda Williams – The Wood
Best Supporting Actor	Best Supporting Actress
**Michael Clarke Duncan – The Green Mile**; Jamie Foxx – Any Given Sunday; Terrence Howard – The Best Man; Ice Cube – Three Kings; Delroy Lindo – The Cider House Rules	**Erykah Badu – The Cider House Rules**; Angela Bassett – Music of the Heart; Lisa Gay Hamilton – True Crime; Rebekah Johnson – Liberty Heights; Queen Latifah – The Bone Collector
Best Screenplay, Adapted or Original	Outstanding Original Soundtrack
**Malcolm D. Lee – The Best Man**; Todd Boyd and Rick Famuyiwa – The Wood; Spike Lee – Summer of Sam	**The Best Man**; Life; Summer of Sam; The Wood
Best Television Miniseries or Movie	Outstanding Director in a Television Miniseries or Movie
**Introducing Dorothy Dandridge (HBO) – Halle Berry and Joshua D. Maurer**; A Lesson Before Dying (HBO) – Ted Demme and Ellen Krass; Having Our Say: The Delany Sisters' First 100 Years (CBS) – Camille Cosby and Jeffrey Grant; Funny Valentines (HBO) – Ron Stacker Thompson and Ashley Tyler; Jackie's Back (Lifetime) – Gideon Amir; Love Songs (Showtime) – Steven Hewitt; Strange Justice (Showtime) – Jacob Epstein and Steven Haft	**Louis Gossett Jr. – Love Songs (Showtime)**; Charles Burnett – Selma, Lord, Selma (ABC); Julie Dash – Funny Valentines (HBO); Ernest R. Dickerson – Strange Justice (Showtime); Robert Townsend – Jackie's Back (Lifetime)
Best Actor in a TV Movie or Limited Series	Best Actress in a TV Movie or Limited Series
**Don Cheadle – A Lesson Before Dying (HBO)**; Andre Braugher – Love Songs (Showtime); Louis Gossett Jr. – Love Songs (Showtime); Delroy Lindo – Strange Justice (Showtime); Sidney Poitier – The Simple Life of Noah Dearborn (CBS)	**Halle Berry – Introducing Dorothy Dandridge (HBO)**; Jenifer Lewis – Jackie's Back (Lifetime); Regina Taylor – Strange Justice (Showtime); Lynn Whitfield – Love Songs (Showtime); Alfre Woodard – Funny Valentines (HBO)
Best Supporting Actor in a TV Movie or Limited Series	Best Supporting Actress in a TV Movie or Limited Series
**Mekhi Phifer – A Lesson Before Dying (HBO)**; Obba Babatundé – Introducing Dorothy Dandridge (HBO); Carl Gordon – Love Songs (Showtime); Brent Jennings – Introducing Dorothy Dandridge (HBO); James Earl Jones – Santa and Pete (CBS)	**Cicely Tyson – A Lesson Before Dying (HBO)**; Lisa Arrindell Anderson – A Lesson Before Dying (HBO); Loretta Devine – Funny Valentines (HBO); Irma P. Hall – A Lesson Before Dying (HBO); Jurnee Smollett-Bell – Selma, Lord, Selma (ABC)
Outstanding Screenplay in a TV Movie or Limited Series
**Ernest J. Gaines – A Lesson Before Dying (HBO)**; Annie Elizabeth Delany and Sarah Louise Delany – Having Our Say: The Delany Sisters' First 100 Years (CBS); Amy Schor Ferris, Ron Stacker Thompson and Ashley Tyler – Funny Valentines (HBO); Charles Fuller – Love Songs (Showtime)

=== Films with multiple nominations ===
The following films received multiple nominations:

Nominations	Films
7	The Best Man
6	The Wood
3	The Hurricane
2	The Cider House Rules
2	Life
2	Summer of Sam

=== Films with multiple wins ===
The following films received multiple wins:

Wins	Films
5	The Best Man
2	The Hurricane

=== Series with multiple nominations ===
The following television series received multiple nominations:

Nominations	Series
7	A Lesson Before Dying
7	Love Songs
5	Funny Valentines
4	Introducing Dorothy Dandridge
3	Jackie's Back
3	Strange Justice
2	Having Our Say: The Delany Sisters’ First 100 Years
2	Selma, Lord, Selma

=== Series with multiple wins ===
The following series received multiple wins:

Wins	Series
4	A Lesson Before Dying
2	Introducing Dorothy Dandridge
