= Love & Basketball =

2000 film by Gina Prince-Bythewood

- Theatrical release poster
- Directed by: Gina Prince-Bythewood
- Written by: Gina Prince-Bythewood
- Produced by: Spike Lee; Sam Kitt
- Starring: Omar Epps; Sanaa Lathan; Alfre Woodard; Dennis Haysbert
- Cinematography: Reynaldo Villalobos
- Edited by: Terilyn A. Shropshire
- Music by: Terence Blanchard
- Production company: 40 Acres and a Mule Filmworks
- Distributed by: New Line Cinema
- Release date: April 21, 2000
- Running time: 127 minutes
- Country: United States
- Language: English
- Budget: $14–20 million
- Box office: $27.7 million

Love & Basketball is a 2000 American romantic sports drama film written and directed by Gina Prince-Bythewood in her feature film directorial debut. It was produced by Spike Lee and Sam Kit and stars Sanaa Lathan, Omar Epps, and Alfre Woodard, with Regina Hall, Gabrielle Union and Debbi Morgan in supporting roles. The film follows Quincy McCall (Epps) and Monica Wright (Lathan), two next-door neighbors in Los Angeles, who are pursuing their respective basketball careers while navigating a developing romantic relationship.

Love & Basketball was released on April 21, 2000. It received positive reviews from critics, with praise for the performances of Lathan and Epps, as well as Prince-Bythewood's direction and screenplay. It grossed $27.7 million worldwide on a production budget of $14–20 million. The film later developed a dedicated following and has been regarded as a cult classic within Black cinema. In 2023, it was selected for preservation in the United States National Film Registry by the Library of Congress for being "culturally, historically or aesthetically significant."

== Plot ==
The story is divided into four quarters, each one representing a different period in the lives of the protagonists.

The first quarter takes place in 1981, when Monica and Quincy are children and become friends due to their shared love for basketball. Monica proves to be an excellent player, beating Quincy in their first game of one on one. However, their friendship is threatened when Quincy knocks Monica down during a game, accidentally cutting her face. They reconcile and share their first kiss, but their relationship is complicated.

The second quarter is set in 1988 when Monica and Quincy are attending Crenshaw High School. Quincy is a star basketball player, and Monica is the leader of the girls' basketball team. Quincy is popular and dates the prettiest girl in school, while Monica struggles to control her emotions on the court and harbors feelings for Quincy. However, they manage to connect romantically and make love after both being accepted at the University of Southern California.

The third quarter begins when they start college, and Quincy is a promising player on the court while Monica frequently has run-ins with her head coach Ellie Davis and struggles to get playing time on the women's team. Quincy struggles to deal with the media attention and discovers his father's infidelity. The pressures of their athletic and academic commitments, coupled with their deteriorating relationship, cause them to break up.

The fourth quarter follows the plot to 1993, a few years before the establishment of the WNBA. Monica and Quincy are both professional basketball players. Monica enjoys success playing for an International Women's Basketball Association (IWBA) team in Barcelona while Quincy struggles in his fifth year as a bench player for the Los Angeles Lakers.

After visiting Quincy in the hospital following a devastating knee injury, Monica learns he is engaged to be married. She also confronts her mother, Camille, about their troubled past. Quincy recovers from his injury and his wedding draws closer, while Monica quits basketball to work at a bank. Camille encourages Monica to pursue her dreams and Quincy and Monica play a high stakes one-on-one game, with Quincy agreeing to call off the wedding if he loses. Although Quincy wins, he realizes he cannot live without Monica and chooses her instead. The two get married and have a daughter. Monica later plays in the WNBA.

In a post-credits scene, Quincy and Monica's young daughter is shown playing with a basketball at a playground.

== Cast ==
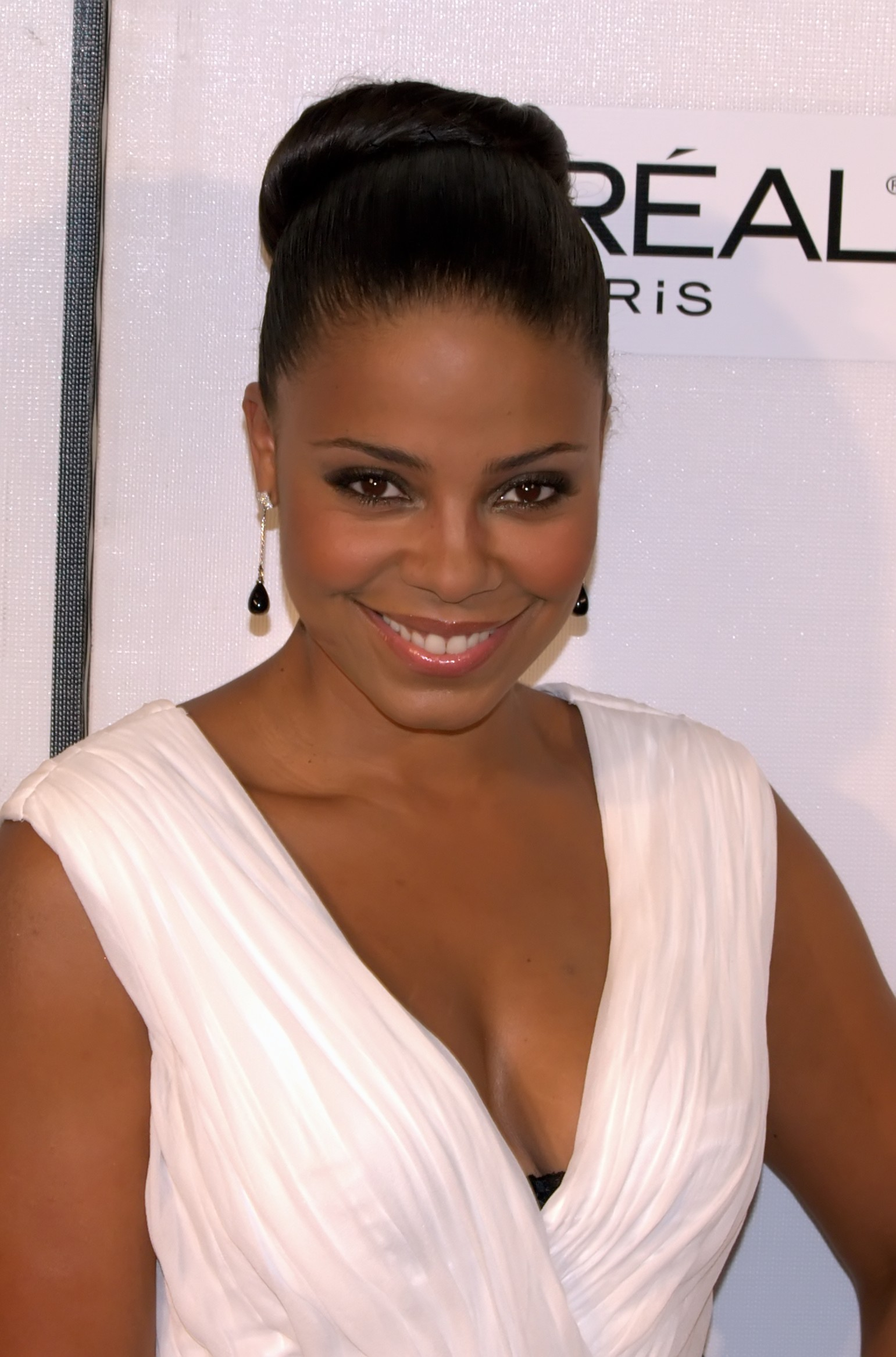
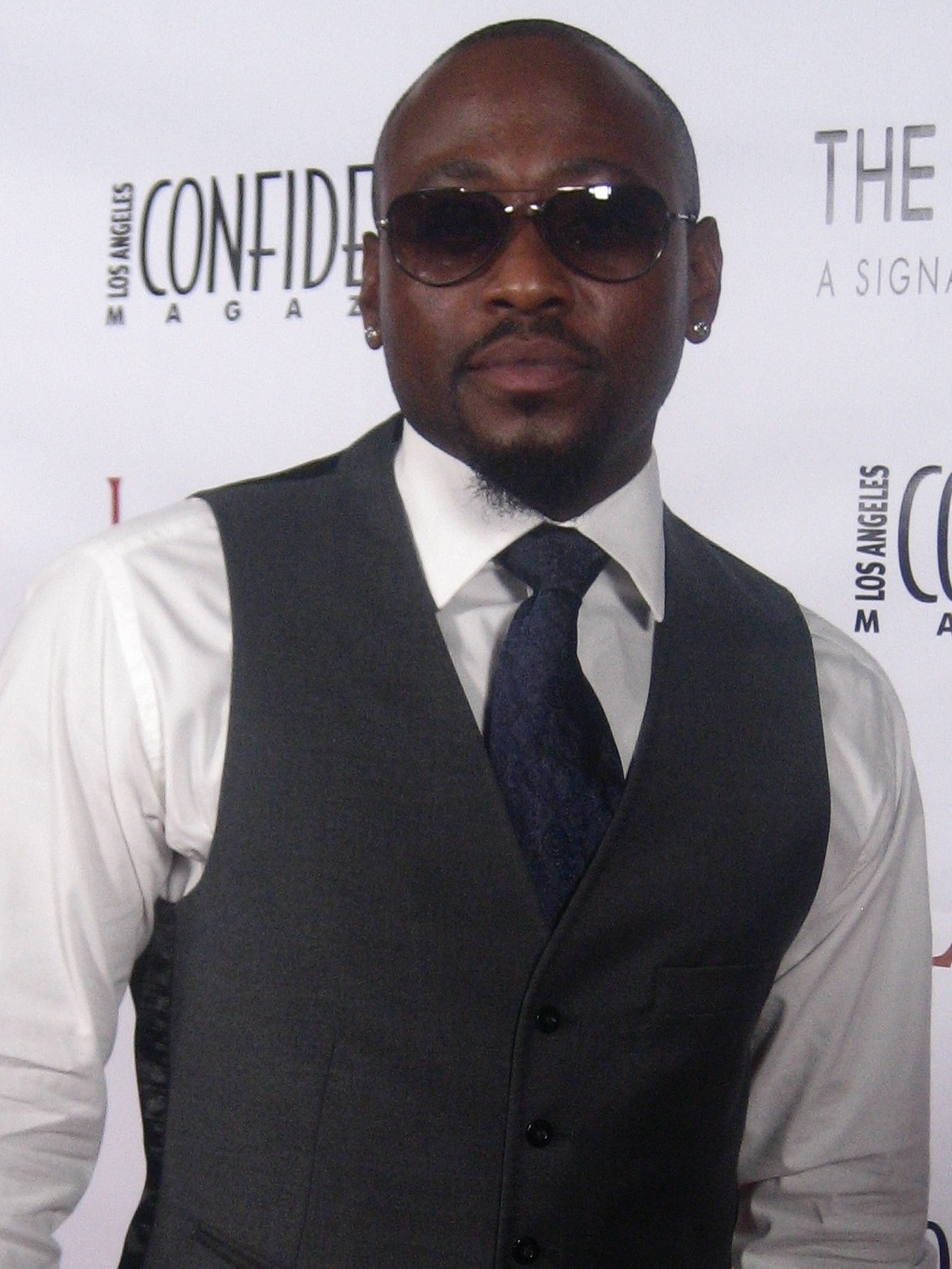
Sanaa Lathan (left) and Omar Epps (right) play the two main characters of the film.
- Omar Epps as Quincy McCall
  - Glenndon Chatman as young Quincy McCall
- Sanaa Lathan as Monica Wright
  - Kyla Pratt as young Monica Wright
- Alfre Woodard as Camille Wright, Monica's mother
- Dennis Haysbert as Zeke McCall, Quincy's father
- Debbi Morgan as Nona McCall, Quincy's mother
- Harry J. Lennix as Nathan Wright, Monica's father
- Christine Dunford as Coach Davis
- Erika Ringor as Sidra O'Neal
- Regina Hall as Lena Wright, Monica's sister
  - Naykia Harris as young Lena Wright
- Boris Kodjoe as Jason
- Gabrielle Union as Shawnee
- Monica Calhoun as Kerry
- Tyra Banks as Kyra, Quincy's fiancée
- Al Foster as Coach Hiserman

== Production ==
In writing the semi-autobiographical film, Prince-Bythewood said her goal was "to do a black When Harry Met Sally." She has credited executive producer Spike Lee with enabling the production of the film and the opportunity to direct her own script. Gabrielle Union, who wound up playing Quincy's high school love interest, originally auditioned for the lead role of Monica. Prior to playing Monica, Sanaa Lathan had never played basketball. Unbeknownst to Prince-Bythewood, stars Lathan and Omar Epps had started dating prior to the film's production.

This was the second film to feature both Epps and Dennis Haysbert; prior to this, they played teammates on a fictitious version of the Cleveland Indians in the 1994 baseball movie Major League II.

=== Music ===
Love & Basketball is the soundtrack to the film, released April 18, 2000, on Overbrook Entertainment and Interscope Records. Production for the album came from several recording artists, including Raphael Saadiq, Angie Stone, Zapp, and Steve "Silk" Hurley. In the US, the album peaked at number 45 on the Billboard 200 and number 15 on R&B/Hip-Hop Albums. Stacia Proefrock of Allmusic gave the album a three-of-five star review, saying, "Songs like Meshell Ndegeocello's 'Fool of Me' help punctuate this story of childhood friends who love each other almost as much as they love the game of basketball. Other highlights of the soundtrack include songs from MC Lyte, Al Green, and Rufus."

== Reception ==
=== Critical response ===
On review aggregator website Rotten Tomatoes, the film holds an approval rating of 85% based on 113 reviews, with an average rating of 6.9/10. The site's critics consensus reads: "Confident directing and acting deliver an insightful look at young athletes." At Metacritic, the film has a weighted average score of 70 out of 100, based on 28 critics, indicating "generally favorable" reviews. Audiences polled by CinemaScore gave the film an average grade of "A" on an A+ to F scale.

Film critic Lisa Schwarzbaum of Entertainment Weekly gave Love & Basketball an A− review. She enjoyed how the film portrayed women's sports in general and said, "The speed and wiliness of the game itself ensure that movies about men who shoot hoops are exciting, but the novelty of watching women bring their own physical grace to the contest is a turn-on."

Rachel Deahl of AllRovi gave the film 3.5 out of 5 stars. In her review she complimented Epps and Lathan on their performances, and said, "Love & Basketball serves as a somber reminder of how few films exist (much less love stories, much less ones that focus on the female perspective) about multi-dimensional African-American characters outside the ghetto." Film critic Desson Thomson of The Washington Post wrote, "Love and Basketball had moments of such tenderness and sophistication, complimented [sic] by such romantic dreaminess between lead performers Omar Epps and Sanaa Lathan. First-time filmmaker Gina Prince-Bythewood's film joins such films as The Best Man and The Wood, which look for the class, not the crass, in African American life."

New York Post critic Jonathan Foreman gave the film a mixed review; he appreciated how the film "effectively conveys the excitement of basketball from a player's point of view", but opined the film is "filled with fake-sounding dialogue you only find in the cheesiest TV movies." Roger Ebert, film critic for the Chicago Sun-Times, wrote, "The film is not as taut as it could have been, but I prefer its emotional perception to the pumped-up sports clichés I was sort of expecting. It's about the pressures of being a star athlete; the whole life, not the game highlights. I'm not sure I quite believe the final shot, though. I think the girl suits up for the sequel." Ebert gave the film three out of four stars. Robert Wilonsky of the Dallas Observer gave the film a negative review, saying "[it] is a film built upon transitions so weak and obvious it's astonishing the entire thing doesn't collapse on itself. You want to root for it, as you would any rookie underdog, but it offers nothing to cheer for." Of the acting, he stated, "Omar Epps possesses a chiseled body and a blank stare [...] Lathan is only slightly better, but she's stuck in a hollow role."

A 2015 review of the film by The A.V. Club praises it as a "nearly perfect modern romantic drama", and notes that it is an impressive debut for writer-director Gina Prince-Bythewood. The review highlights the film's focus on the protagonist, Monica, and her coming-of-age story as a female basketball player who is constantly told that her body type and attitude are unacceptable. The review also notes the film's respect for Monica's athleticism, which is captured in every frame, and praises the director's tender and celebratory gaze towards her female lead. The film has also been analyzed in terms of the sacrifices expected of women with heterosexual relationships, particularly when Monica's athletic ambitions conflict with Quincy's expectations. Linda Holmes, of the NPR program "Pop Culture Happy Hour," has often praised Love & Basketball, calling it "one of [her] favorite movies of any kind, by anyone."

=== Box office ===
Love & Basketball was released in North America on April 21, 2000 to 1,237 theaters. It grossed $3,176,000 its first day and ending its North American weekend with $8,139,180, which was the second-highest grossing movie of the April 21–23, 2000 weekend, only behind U-571. Love & Basketball grossed $27,459,615 in the United States, which is ninth all-time for a basketball film and thirty-seventh all-time for a sports drama. The film grossed $27,728,118 worldwide; $268,503 (1%) was grossed outside of the United States.

== Home video ==
Love & Basketball was released on DVD in the United States on after its theatrical release. It was released by The Criterion Collection on Blu-ray on September 21, 2021.

== Awards ==
BET Awards

Year	Award	Nominee	Result	Ref.
2001	Best Actress	Sanaa Lathan	Won	
2001	Best Actor	Omar Epps	Nominated	

Black Reel Awards

Year	Award	Nominee	Result	Ref.
2001	Best Film	Love & Basketball	Won	
2001	Best Film Poster	Love & Basketball	Won	
2001	Best Soundtrack	Love & Basketball	Won	
2001	Best Actress	Sanaa Lathan	Won	
2001	Best Director	Gina Prince-Bythewood	Won	
2001	Best Song	"Fool of Me" (Meshell Ndegeocello)	Won	

Humanitas Prize

Year	Award	Nominee	Result	Ref.
2000	Sundance Film Category	Love & Basketball	Won	

Independent Spirit Awards

Year	Award	Nominee	Result	Ref.
2000	Best First Feature	Love & Basketball	Nominated	
2000	Best First Screenplay	Gina Prince-Bythewood	Won	
2000	Best Female Lead	Sanaa Lathan	Nominated	

Key Art Awards

Year	Award	Nominee	Result	Ref.
2001	Best Drama Poster	D Stevens	Won	

NAACP Image Awards

Year	Award	Nominee	Result	Ref.
2001	Outstanding Motion Picture	Love & Basketball	Nominated	
2001	Outstanding Actor in a Motion Picture	Omar Epps	Nominated	
2001	Outstanding Actress in a Motion Picture	Sanaa Lathan	Won	
2001	Outstanding Supporting Actress in a Motion Picture	Alfre Woodard	Won	
2001	Outstanding Youth Actor/Actress	Kyla Pratt	Nominated	

== See also ==
- List of basketball films
