= Yared Zeleke =

Ethiopian film director from Addis Ababa

- Born: Addis Ababa, Ethiopia
- Education: New York University
- Occupation: Film director

Yared Zeleke is an Ethiopian film director from Addis Ababa. He has an M.F.A. in Writing and Directing from New York University. His first feature film, Lamb, was screened at the 2015 Cannes Film Festival, Un Certain Regard. It is the first film from Ethiopia to have been officially selected in the festival's 68-year history.
