= Jenn Shaw =

American film director and producer (born 1983)

Jennifer Jeanine Shaw (born September 15, 1983) is an American film director and producer

== Biography ==
Shaw was born in Albany, Georgia, the daughter of Dr. Pamella Shaw, a University administrator and Eugene Shaw an engineer. She attended the University of Kentucky and New York University's Tisch School of Arts for Television and Film. She graduated in 2006.
