= 9th Annual Black Reel Awards =

Film-industry awards in 2008

9th Black Reel Awards
- Date: December 14, 2008
- Location: Washington, D.C.

The 2008 Black Reel Awards, which annually recognize and celebrate the achievements of black people in feature, independent and television films, took place in Washington, D.C., on December 14, 2008. Cadillac Records, The Secret Life of Bees and Slumdog Millionaire all won three awards at the ceremony.

== Winners and nominees ==
Winners are listed first and highlighted in bold.

Best Film	Best Director
**Cadillac Records**; Miracle at St. Anna; The Secret Life of Bees; Seven Pounds; Traitor	**Gina Prince-Bythewood – The Secret Life of Bees**; Malcolm D. Lee – Soul Men; Spike Lee – Miracle at St. Anna; Darnell Martin – Cadillac Records; Gabriele Muccino – Seven Pounds
Best Actor	Best Actress
**Dev Patel – Slumdog Millionaire**; Don Cheadle – Traitor; Mos Def – Be Kind Rewind; Chiwetel Ejiofor – Redbelt; Derek Luke – Miracle at St. Anna	**Queen Latifah – The Secret Life of Bees**; Jennifer Hudson – The Secret Life of Bees; Sanaa Lathan – The Family That Preys; Keke Palmer – The Longshots; Alfre Woodard – The Family That Preys
Best Supporting Actor	Best Supporting Actress
**Jeffrey Wright – Cadillac Records**; Mos Def – Cadillac Records; Terrence Howard – Iron Man; Brandon T. Jackson – Tropic Thunder; Eamonn Walker – Cadillac Records	**Viola Davis – Doubt**; Alice Braga – Blindness; Penélope Cruz – Vicky Cristina Barcelona; Taraji P. Henson – The Curious Case of Benjamin Button; Sophie Okonedo – The Secret Life of Bees
Best Screenplay, Adapted or Original	Outstanding Original Score
**Gina Prince-Bythewood – The Secret Life of Bees**; Darnell Martin – Cadillac Records; James McBride – Miracle at St. Anna; Tyler Perry – The Family That Preys; Tyler Perry – Meet the Browns	**A. R. Rahman – Slumdog Millionaire**; Terrence Blanchard and Steve Jordan – Cadillac Records; Stanley Clarke – Soul Men; Mason Daring – Honeydripper; Steve Isles – RocknRolla
Best Breakthrough Performance	Best Ensemble (Awarded to Casting Directors)
**Dev Patel – Slumdog Millionaire**; Omar Benson Miller – Miracle at St. Anna; Columbus Short – Cadillac Records; Saïd Taghmaoui – Traitor; Tristan Wilds – The Secret Life of Bees	**Michelle Adams and Kimberly Hardin – Cadillac Records**; Kim Coleman, Béatrice Kruger and Karen Kaia Livers – Miracle at St. Anna; Aisha Coley, Craig and Mark Fincannon – The Secret Life of Bees; John Hubbard – Honeydripper; Gail Stevens and Loveleen Tandan – Slumdog Millionaire
