= Pastor Brown =

- Film poster
- Directed by: Rockmond Dunbar
- Written by: Rhonda Baraka
- Produced by: Rock Capital Films
- Starring: Salli Richardson; Nicole Ari Parker; Michael B. Jordan; Michael Beach; Keith David
- Release date: June 26, 2009 (American Black Film Festival)
- Country: United States

Pastor Brown is a 2009 American Christian drama film. It was written by Rhonda Baraka and directed by Rockmond Dunbar. The film was shot in Atlanta, Georgia. Pastor Brown stars Salli Richardson, Nicole Ari Parker, Michael B. Jordan, Michael Beach, Monica, and Keith David. This film was the debut of R&B singer Grammy-winner India.Arie as an actress.

The film made its television debut on the Lifetime network on Saturday, February 16, 2013.

== Plot ==
When her father unexpectedly becomes terminally ill, Jessica ("Jesse"), an exotic dancer, returns home for the first time in over a decade. As her father's dying wish, he asks her to take over as head of Mount Olive Baptist Church. The news turns her and her family's life upside down. Jesse accepts her father's commission, thereby pitting herself against her sister and most of the leadership at Mount Olive who know her secret past.

Through accepting her father's request, Jesse embarks upon a course that changes her world forever. Not only does she reconnect with her family and her teenage son, but she also finds the dignity and self-love she lost so long ago.

== Cast ==
- Salli Richardson as Jessica Brown
- Nicole Ari Parker as Tonya Copeland Brown
- Tasha Smith as Angelique Todd
- Michael Beach as Avery Callagan
- Michael B. Jordan as Tariq Brown
- Keith David as Pastor Joe Brown
- Rockmond Dunbar as Amir
- Monica as Lisa Cross
- Tisha Campbell-Martin as Amanda Carlton
- India Arie as Lateefah
- Ernie Hudson as Deacon Harold Todd
- Dondre Whitfield as Chaz
- Angie Stone as Rick Fredericks
- Keith Sweat as Nasim
- Mari Morrow as Adrian
- Creflo Dollar as Preacher
- Bryce Wilson as Hasan

== Production and broadcast ==
The film was shot in Atlanta in 2008, the church scenes being shot in Decatur

The film was not broadcast before 2013 by Lifetime.

== Nominations ==
The film received various nominations at the Black Reel Awards of 2014.

== Reception ==
The film received positive response in The Atlanta Journal-Constitution, The Christian Post, and the South Florida Times, all insisting on the spiritual and emotional aspects.

A review at the Movie Scene underlined the numerous biblical references in the film.
