= Rhonda Baraka =

American director and screenwriter

- Born: March 9, 1962 (age 64); Tuskegee, Alabama, U.S
- Occupations: Director, writer
- Years active: 1998–present
- Spouse: Tony Colvin-Baraka

Rhonda Baraka (born March 9, 1962) is an American film and television director and screenwriter. She wrote more than 30 films. Her screenwriting debut was with the 2009 drama film Pastor Brown, for which she received her first Black Reel Award for Outstanding Screenplay, TV Movie or Limited Series nomination. She received two more nominations for Love Under New Management: The Miki Howard Story (2016) and Bobbi Kristina (2017). She received NAACP Image Awards nomination for Outstanding Writing in a Motion Picture (Television) for Merry Christmas, Baby (2015). At the 11th Canadian Screen Awards, Baraka received Award for Best Writing, TV Movie for Miracle in Motor City.

Baraka was born in Tuskegee, Alabama and graduated from the Talladega College. She wrote feature films Heritage Falls (2016) and Christmas on the Coast (2017). She made her directing debut in 2015 and later directed made-for-television movies such as Pride & Prejudice: Atlanta (2019), Fallen Angels Murder Club: Friends to Die For, Fallen Angels Murder Club: Heroes and Felons and A Christmas Spark (both 2022) for Lifetime.
