= Bamboozled =

- Theatrical release poster
- Directed by: Spike Lee
- Written by: Spike Lee
- Produced by: Jon Kilik, Spike Lee
- Starring: Damon Wayans; Savion Glover; Jada Pinkett Smith; Tommy Davidson; Michael Rapaport
- Cinematography: Ellen Kuras
- Edited by: Sam Pollard
- Music by: Terence Blanchard
- Production company: 40 Acres and a Mule Filmworks
- Distributed by: New Line Cinema
- Release date: October 6, 2000 (United States)
- Running time: 135 minutes
- Country: United States
- Language: English
- Budget: $10 million
- Box office: $2.5 million

Bamboozled is a 2000 American satirical black comedy-drama film written and directed by Spike Lee about a modern televised minstrel show featuring black actors donning blackface makeup and the resulting violent fallout from the show's success. It features an ensemble cast including Damon Wayans, Jada Pinkett Smith, Savion Glover, Tommy Davidson, and Michael Rapaport.

The film was given a limited release by New Line Cinema during the fall of 2000 and was released on DVD the following year. Critical reception was mixed, and the film was unsuccessful financially, becoming a box office bomb. Despite its initial reception, Bamboozled later achieved cult film status for its satirical look at stereotypical depictions of black people in both historical and contemporary American film and television productions, and, in 2023, was selected for preservation in the United States National Film Registry by the Library of Congress as being "culturally, historically, or aesthetically significant."

== Plot ==
Pierre Delacroix (real name Peerless Dothan) is an uptight, Harvard-educated African-American man in the employment of television network CNS. At work, he endures torment from his boss Thomas Dunwitty, a tactless, boorish white man. Not only does Dunwitty use African-American Vernacular English (AAVE) and the word "nigger" repeatedly in conversations, he also proudly proclaims that since he is married to a black woman and has two mixed-race children with her, he is more black than Delacroix and thus can say "nigger". Dunwitty frequently rejects Delacroix's scripts for series that portray black people in positive, intelligent scenarios, dismissing them as "Cosby clones."

In an effort to escape his contract through being fired, Delacroix develops a minstrel show with the help of his personal assistant Sloan Hopkins. Mantan: The New Millennium Minstrel Show features black actors in blackface, extremely racist jokes and puns, and offensively stereotyped animated cartoons. Delacroix and Hopkins recruit two impoverished homeless street performers, Manray and Womack, to star in the show. While Womack is horrified when Delacroix tells him details about the show, Manray sees it as his big chance to become rich and famous for his tap-dancing skills.

To Delacroix's horror, not only does Dunwitty enthusiastically endorse the show, it also becomes hugely successful. As soon as it premieres, Manray and Womack become big stars, while Delacroix, contrary to his original stated intent, defends the show as satire. Delacroix quickly embraces the fame and recognition he receives while Hopkins becomes ashamed of her association with it. Meanwhile, an underground, militant rap group called the Mau Maus, led by Hopkins's older brother Julius, becomes increasingly angry at the show's content. Though they had earlier unsuccessfully auditioned for the program's live band position, the group plans to end the show using violence.

Womack quits, fed up with the show and Manray's increasing ego. Manray and Hopkins grow closer, despite Delacroix's attempts to sabotage their relationship. Delacroix confronts Hopkins, and when she lashes back at him, he fires her. She then shows him a videotaped montage she created of racist footage culled from assorted media to shame Delacroix into stopping production of the show, but he refuses to watch it. After an argument with Delacroix, Manray realizes he is being exploited and defiantly announces that he will no longer wear blackface. He appears in front of the studio audience, who are all in blackface, and does his dance number in his regular clothing. The network executives immediately turn against Manray, and Dunwitty fires him.

The Mau Maus kidnap Manray and announce his public execution via live webcast. The authorities work feverishly to track down the source of the internet feed, but Manray is nevertheless assassinated while doing his famous tap dancing. At his office, Delacroix (now in blackface himself, mourning Manray's death) fantasizes that the various black-themed antique collectibles in his office are staring him down and coming to life; in a rage, he destroys many of the items. The police kill all the members of the Mau Maus except for One-Sixteenth Blak, a white member, who demands to die with the others.

Furious, Hopkins confronts Delacroix at gunpoint and demands that he play her tape. As he does so, Hopkins reminds him of the lives that were ruined because of his actions. During a struggle over the gun, Delacroix is shot in the stomach. Hopkins flees while proclaiming that it was Delacroix's own fault that he got shot. Delacroix, holding the gun in his hands to make his wound appear self-inflicted, watches the tape as he lies dying on the floor. The film concludes with a full reveal of the tape's contents; a long montage of racially insensitive and demeaning clips of African-American characters from Hollywood films of the first half of the 20th century. (Note: Some of the films used in the sequence are The Birth of a Nation, The Jazz Singer, Gone with the Wind, Babes in Arms, Holiday Inn, Judge Priest, Ub Iwerks' cartoon Little Black Sambo, Walter Lantz's cartoon Scrub Me Mama with a Boogie Beat, the Screen Songs short Jingle Jangle Jungle, the Bugs Bunny Merrie Melodies short All This and Rabbit Stew, and from the Hal Roach comedy School's Out, Our Gang kids Allen "Farina" Hoskins and Matthew "Stymie" Beard.) Delacroix reflects on the words of James Baldwin that "People pay for what they do, and still more for what they have allowed themselves to become, and they pay for it, very simply, by the lives they lead." and then reflects on his father telling him to “always keep ‘em laughing”. Afterwards, Manray is shown doing his last Mantan sequence on stage as an unseen audience laughs hysterically.

== Cast ==
- Damon Wayans as Pierre "Peerless Dothan" Delacroix
- Savion Glover as Manray "Mantan"
- Jada Pinkett Smith as Sloan Hopkins
- Tommy Davidson as Womack "Sleep 'n Eat"
- Michael Rapaport as Thomas Dunwitty
- Mos Def as Julius "Big Blak Afrika" Hopkins
- Thomas Jefferson Byrd as Honeycutt
- Paul Mooney as Junebug
- Craig Grant as Hard Blak
- Gano Grills as Double Blak
- Canibus as Mo Blak
- Charli Baltimore as Smooth Blak
- MC Serch as One-Sixteenth Blak
- Kim Director as Starlet
- Danny Hoch as Timmi Hillnigger
- The Roots as The Alabama Porch Monkeys
- Reverend Al Sharpton as Himself

== Production ==
Most of the film was shot on Mini DV digital video, using the Sony VX 1000 camera, and later converted to film format. This kept the budget limited to $10 million and allowed the use of multiple cameras to simultaneously capture masters, two-shots and close-ups to save time. The Mantan: New Millenium Minstrel Show sequences, and their sponsor ads, were shot on Super 16 film stock.

In a 2015 interview, Spike Lee credited A Face in the Crowd with inspiring him to make Bamboozled.

== Soundtrack ==
Bamboozled is the soundtrack album to Spike Lee's 2000 film Bamboozled. Motown Records released the album on September 26, 2000. It peaked at number 60 on the Top R&B/Hip-Hop Albums chart. Six tracks on the album were performed by future Grammy award winner India.Arie in what were her first official appearances on an album.

Bamboozled

Soundtrack album by Various artists
- Released: September 26, 2000
- Recorded: 2000
- Genres: Hip-hop; R&B
- Label: Motown
- Producers: Kedar Massenburg (exec.); L. Londell McMillan (exec.); Spike Lee (exec.); Jay Dee

Professional ratings
Review scores
| Source | Rating |
|---|---|
| AllMusic | 4/5 stars |

=== Track listing ===
1. "Blak Iz Blak" – 4:42 (Mau Maus: Mos Def, Canibus, MC Serch, Charli Baltimore, Mums, Gano Grills and DJ Scratch)
2. "Misrepresented People" – 4:37 (Stevie Wonder)
3. "Hollywood" – 5:32 (Erykah Badu)
4. "Just a Song" – 4:45 (Goodie Mob)
5. "Slippery Shoes" – 3:40 (Angie Stone)
6. "In My Head" – 4:40 (India.Arie)
7. "Dream with No Love" – 5:02 (Gerald Levert)
8. "The Light" (Remix) – 4:01 (Common and Erykah Badu)
9. "Some Years Ago" – 5:01 (Stevie Wonder)
10. "Charli" – 4:10 (Charli Baltimore)
11. "Burned Hollywood Burned" – 4:15 (Chuck D, The Roots and Zack de la Rocha)
12. "One Night" – 4:24 (Profyle)
13. "Ploylessness" – 1:57 (Mums)
14. "Shadowlands" – 5:10 (Bruce Hornsby)
15. "2045 Radical Man" – 6:36 (Prince)
16. "God in You" – 1:21 (India.Arie)
17. "Back in the Middle" – 1:18 (India.Arie)
18. "Strength Courage and Wisdom" – 1:35 (India.Arie)
19. "Can I Walk with You" – 1:05 (India.Arie)
20. "Promises" – 1:37 (India.Arie)

== Reception ==
=== Critical response ===
On Rotten Tomatoes, the film has an approval rating of 54% based on reviews from 108 critics. The site's consensus is: "Bamboozled is too heavy-handed in its satire and comes across as more messy and overwrought than biting." On Metacritic it has a score of 54% based on reviews from 39 critics, indicating "mixed or average reviews."

Among those who gave positive reviews to the film were CNN correspondent Dennis Michael, who compared the film favorably to Mel Brooks' The Producers and praised Glover's performance in the lead role, Kenneth Turan of the Los Angeles Times, who described the film as "savage, abrasive, audacious and confrontational" and "the work of a master provocateur", and Stephen Holden of The New York Times, who described the film as "an almost oxymoronic entity, an important Hollywood movie." It was not reviewed as favorably by the Chicago Sun-Times' Roger Ebert, who gave the film 2 stars out of a possible 4. According to Ebert, "the film is a satirical attack on the way TV uses and misuses African-American images, but many viewers will leave the theater thinking Lee has misused them himself." Despite being critical of some of Lee's earlier work, Stanley Crouch praised Bamboozled.

By the time of its twentieth anniversary, Bamboozled had been reappraised as an underappreciated work of Lee's. Writing for Rolling Stone, David Fear noted that "the really scary thing is that, 20 years on, Bamboozled feels incredibly contemporary. It doesn't look so extreme after all...and when you consider the content of this film, that's a very troubling thing.”

=== Box office ===
The film grossed $2,463,650 at the box office on a $10 million budget.

== Home media ==
Bamboozled was released on VHS and DVD by New Line Home Entertainment on April 17, 2001. The DVD edition includes a director's commentary from Spike Lee in addition to behind-the-scenes featurettes and deleted scenes.

Bamboozled was added to The Criterion Collection in 2020, with a reissue on DVD and debut on Blu-ray occurring on March 17 of that year.

== See also ==
- Network, satirical drama-comedy about a controversial television show with a similar structure, referenced by "Mantan" in pilot
- Mantan Moreland, Black actor, comedian, and vaudevillian whose work is referenced and shown throughout the film.
- American Fiction, a 2023 film about a Black writer who becomes famous after his satire is mistaken for sincerity
- The Scottsboro Boys, a 2010 musical which uses minstrel show conventions to discuss anti-Black racism.
