= Black Reel Awards =

American film award

- Current: Black Reel Awards of 2026
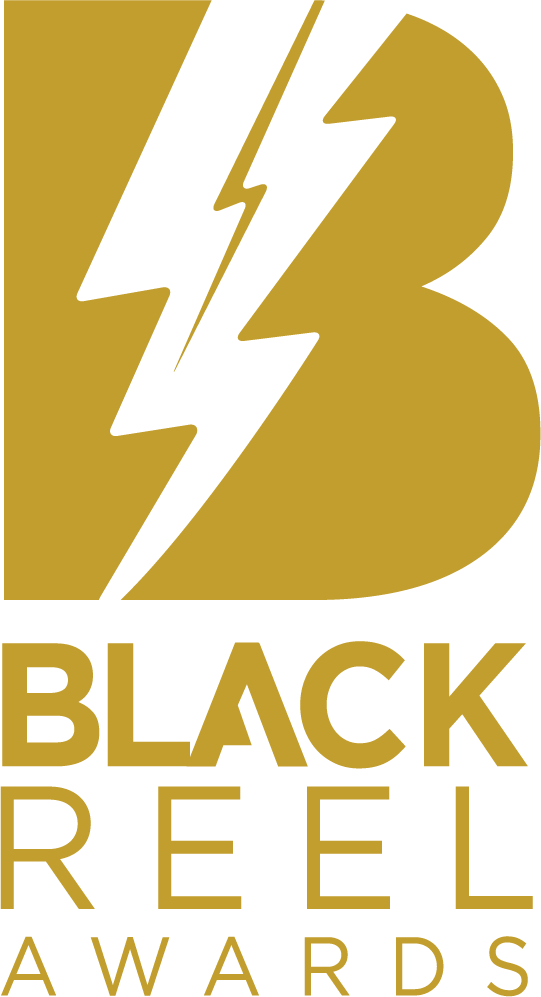
- Awarded for: Excellence in African-American Films
- Country: United States
- Presented by: Foundation for the Advancement of African-Americans in Film
- First award: February 16, 2000; 26 years ago
- Website: blackreelawards.com

The Black Reel Awards, or BRAs, is an annual American awards ceremony hosted by the Foundation for the Augmentation of African Americans in Film (FAAAF) to recognize excellence of African Americans, as well as the cinematic achievements of the African diaspora, in the global film industry, as assessed by the foundation’s voting membership. The various category winners are awarded a copy of a statuette, officially called the Black Reel Award. The awards, first presented in 2000 in Washington, DC, are overseen by FAAAF.

The awards ceremony was initially awarded online during its first two years before the first live show presentation in 2002. The awards have broadcast to radio since 2014. The Black Reel Awards is the oldest cinema-exclusive awards ceremony for African Americans.

== History ==
Founded by film critic Tim Gordon and Sabrina McNeal in 2000, the first annual Black Reel Awards presentation was held on February 16, 2000, online courtesy of Reel Images Magazine. Two years later, the third annual Black Reel Awards held its first live presentation at a private dinner function at the Cada Vez in Washington, DC, with an audience of about 150 people. Twenty statuettes were awarded, honoring African American artists, directors and other participants in the filmmaking industry, for their works in 2001. The ceremony ran for 90 minutes.

In subsequent years, the Black Reel Awards have largely been presented in the nation's capital, with the exception of one year when the awards were moved to New York. The awards have been presented live several times: the fourth annual Black Reel Awards presentation was held at H_{2}O on the Southwest waterfront in Washington, DC with an audience of about 200 people; the sixth annual Black Reel Awards presentation was held at the French Embassy with an audience of about 350 people; and the thirteenth annual Black Reel Awards presentation was held at the MIST Harlem with an audience of about 200 people.

Initially winners were announced online. Later, the live awards presentations would use a sealed envelope to reveal the name of each winner.

The Black Reel Awards benefit the Foundation for the Advancement of African-Americans in Film (FAAAF), a non-profit arts organization whose mission is to provide educational opportunities to future minority film executives. Through the FAAAF programs "Reel Kids", and "Producer's Institute", scholarships are awarded to minority junior high, high school and college graduate students pursuing careers in the movie and television industries.

In 2015, the foundation changed its name to the Foundation for the Augmentation of African-Americans in Film.

=== Institutions ===
The first Outstanding Actor award was given to Denzel Washington for his performance in The Hurricane. He subsequently received the same honor the next two years, for his performances in Remember the Titans and Training Day.

At the 3rd Annual Black Reel Awards ceremony, held on February 16, 2002, the Outstanding Foreign Film category was introduced.

The 6th Annual Black Reel Awards, held in 2005, presented the first Vanguard Award for entertainer of the year to Jamie Foxx for his performances in Collateral, Redemption: The Stan Tookie Williams Story, and Ray.

Each of the Black Reel Awards ceremonies has ended with the Black Reel Award for Outstanding Film.

== Black Reel Awards statuette ==
=== Motion picture categories ===
- Outstanding Film: since 2000
- Outstanding Leading Performance: since 2024
- Outstanding Director: since 2000
- Outstanding Supporting Performance: since 2024
- Outstanding Screenplay, Adapted or Original: since 2000
- Outstanding Ensemble: since 2006
- Outstanding Documentary: since 2010
- Outstanding Foreign Film: since 2012
- Outstanding World Cinema Film: since 2017
- Outstanding Original Score: since 2011
- Outstanding Original Song: since 2001
- Outstanding Voice Performance: since 2013

=== Independent & next generation categories ===
- Outstanding Independent Film: since 2002
- Outstanding Independent Documentary: since 2010
- Outstanding Independent Short Film: since 2010
- Outstanding Breakthrough Performance: since 2003
- Outstanding Emerging Director: since 2017
- Outstanding First Screenplay: since 2017

=== Professional categories ===
- Outstanding Cinematography : Since 2019
- Outstanding Costume Design: Since 2019
- Outstanding Production Design: Since 2019
- Outstanding Editing: Since 2022

==== Discontinued categories ====
Television

- Outstanding Original Television Program: 2001 to 2005

Film

- Outstanding Actor: 2000 to 2023
- Outstanding Actress: 2000 to 2023
- Outstanding Actor – Independent Film: 2002 to 2005
- Outstanding Actress – Independent Film: 2003 to 2005
- Outstanding Actor – Drama: 2005 only
- Outstanding Actor – Comedy or Musical: 2005 only
- Outstanding Actress – Drama: 2005 only
- Outstanding Actress – Musical or Comedy: 2005 only
- Outstanding Supporting Actor: 2000 to 2023
- Outstanding Supporting Actress: 2000 to 2023
- Outstanding Supporting Actor – Drama: 2005 only
- Outstanding Supporting Actor – Comedy or Musical
- Outstanding Supporting Actress – Drama: 2005 only
- Outstanding Supporting Actress – Musical or Comedy: 2005 only
- Outstanding Film – Drama: 2005 only
- Outstanding Film – Musical or Comedy: 2005 only
- Outstanding Film Poster: 2001 to 2002
- Outstanding Original Soundtrack: 2000 to 2009

In 2005, three categories, Outstanding Actor, Outstanding Actress, as well as Outstanding Film awards were split into two separate categories (Drama and Musical/Comedy). In addition, the Outstanding Original Television Program was discontinued in 2005 and later expanded and resurfaced in 2015 as the Outstanding Television Documentary or Special category.

In 2024, the categories for Outstanding Actor and Actress and Outstanding Supporting Actor and Actress were retired in favor of gender-neutral Outstanding Lead Performance and Outstanding Supporting Performance categories.

== Television categories ==
A television awards, known as the Black Reel Awards for Television was first presented on August 1, 2017. The awards honors performers, programs, directors and writers over 27 categories in drama, comedy, music, documentaries and TV Movie or Limited Series. The TV Movie or Limited Series categories, which previously were honored as part of the Black Reel Awards were moved to the television awards.

== Special categories ==
The Special Black Reel Awards are voted on by special foundation committees, rather than by the voting academy membership as a whole. They are not always presented on a consistent annual basis.

=== Current special categories ===
- Vanguard Entertainer of the Year Award: since 2004
- Oscar Micheaux Filmmaker Distinction Award: since 2017
- Sidney Poitier Lifetime Achievement Award: since 2017
- Ruby Dee Humanitarian Award: since 2017
- Chadwick Boseman Vanguard Award: since 2024

=== Discontinued special categories ===
- Black Reel Award Special Achievement Award: 2004 to 2006

== Ceremonies ==
- 2000 Awards
- 2001 Awards
- 2002 Awards
- 2003 Awards
- 2004 Awards
- 2005 Awards
- 2006 Awards
- 2007 Awards
- 2008 Awards
- 2010 Awards
- 2011 Awards
- 2012 Awards
- 2013 Awards
- 2014 Awards
- 2015 Awards
- 2016 Awards
- 2017 Awards
- 2018 Awards
- 2019 Awards
- 2020 Awards
- 2021 Awards
- 2022 Awards
- 2023 Awards
- 2024 Awards
- 2025 Awards

== Film nominations ==
Below are the motion picture films with 10 or more nominations. Sinners holds the record for the most nominations with 21 as well as holding the record for the most wins for a single film with 14 categorical wins. 12 Years a Slave, Selma, and Dolemite Is My Name are tied for second place with 8 wins apiece. Spike Lee's BlacKkKlansman and Highest 2 Lowest currently holds the record for most nominations without a single win (11).

21 Nominations

- Sinners 14 wins

20 Nominations

- The Harder They Fall 6 wins

19 Nominations

- The Color Purple 9 wins

17 Nominations

- Black Panther 10 wins

15 Nominations

- One Night in Miami... 5 wins

14 nominations

- Black Panther: Wakanda Forever 5 wins
- For Colored Girls 3 wins
- If Beale Street Could Talk 4 wins
- Queen & Slim 4 wins
- The Woman King 6 wins

13 nominations

- Moonlight 7 wins
- Passing 3 wins

12 nominations

- Get Out 7 wins
- Judas and the Black Messiah 3 wins

11 nominations

- BlacKkKlansman 0 wins
- Dreamgirls 6 wins
- Highest 2 Lowest
- Till 2 wins
- Us 4 wins

10 nominations

- Baby Boy 0 wins
- Cadillac Records 3 wins
- Dear White People 2 wins
- Dolemite Is My Name 8 wins
- Fences 2 wins
- The Inspection 4 wins
- Love & Basketball 6 wins
- Ma Rainey's Black Bottom 2 wins
- Precious 7 wins
- Rustin' 0 wins
- Selma 8 wins

== Records ==
=== Film ===
==== Actors with multiple awards for motion picture performances ====
- D - indicates a winning role in drama categories (2005 ceremony)
- C/M - indicates a winning role in comedy or musical categories (2005 ceremony)
- I - indicates a winning role in Independent categories

Actor/Actress	Leading Role	Supporting Role	Breakthrough	Voice Performance	Total awards	Total nominations
Denzel Washington	The Hurricane (2000); Remember the Titans (2001); Training Day (2002); Flight (2013); Fences (2017)				5	16
Viola Davis	The Help (2012); Ma Rainey's Black Bottom (2021)	Doubt (2008); Fences (2017)			4	12
Jamie Foxx	Ray (D, 2005)	Ali (2002); Collateral (2005)		Soul (2021)	4	13
Lupita Nyong’o	Us (2020)	12 Years a Slave (2014)	12 Years a Slave (2014)		3	6
Chiwetel Ejiofor	Dirty Pretty Things (2003); 12 Years a Slave (2014)			The Lion King (2020)	3	10
Dev Patel	Slumdog Millionaire (2008)		Slumdog Millionaire (2008)		2	2
Teyonah Parris	Chi-Raq (2016)		Dear White People (2015)		2	3
Wesley Snipes		Brooklyn’s Finest (2010); Dolemite Is My Name (2020)			2	3
Da’Vine Joy Randolph		Dolemite Is My Name (2020)	Dolemite Is My Name (2020)		2	3
Tiffany Haddish		Girls Trip (2018)	Girls Trip (2018)		2	2
Michael B. Jordan	Creed (2016); Sinners (2026)	Black Panther (2019)			3	6
Tessa Thompson	Passing (2022)	Creed (2016)	For Colored Girls (2011)		3	6
Terrence Howard	Hustle & Flow (2006)	Crash (2005)			2	4
Sharon Warren		Ray (2005)	Ray (2005)		2	2
Sanaa Lathan	Love & Basketball (2001); Out of Time (2004)				2	5
Samuel L. Jackson		Django Unchained (2013)		Turbo (2014)	2	9
Quvenzhané Wallis	Beasts of the Southern Wild (2013)		Beasts of the Southern Wild (2013)		2	4
Queen Latifah	The Secret Life of Bees (2009)	Chicago (2003)			2	7
Naomie Harris		Skyfall (2013)	28 Days Later (2003)		2	5
Morgan Freeman	Invictus (2010)			The Lego Movie (2015)	2	6
Kimberly Elise	Woman Thou Art Loosed (I, 2005); Diary of a Mad Black Woman (2006)				2	5
Jennifer Hudson		Dreamgirls (2007)	Dreamgirls (2007)		2	4
Idris Elba		Beasts of No Nation (2016)		The Jungle Book (2017)	2	9
Gabourey Sidibe	Precious (2010)		Precious (2010)		2	3
Don Cheadle		Traffic (2001); The Guard (2012)			2	7
Djimon Hounsou		In America (2003); Blood Diamond (2007)			2	2
Derek Luke	Antwone Fisher (2003)		Antwone Fisher (2003)		2	5
Dennis Haysbert		Far From Heaven (2003)		Wreck-It Ralph (2013)	2	2
Daniel Kaluuya	Get Out (2018)	Judas and the Black Messiah (2021)	Get Out (2018)		3	7
Barkhad Abdi		Captain Phillips (2014)	Captain Phillips (2014)		2	2
Anthony Mackie	Night Catches Us (2011)	The Hurt Locker (2010)			2	4
Chadwick Boseman	Black Panther (2019); Ma Rainey's Black Bottom (2021)				2	6
Angela Bassett	Sunshine State (2003)	Black Panther: Wakanda Forever (2023)			2	9
Jeremy Pope	The Inspection (2023)		The Inspection (2023)		2	2
Jeffrey Wright	American Fiction (2024)	Cadillac Records (2008)			2	7
Shameik Moore				Spider-Man: Into the Spider-Verse (2008); Spider-Man: Across the Spider-Verse (2024)	2	3

=== Notes ===
==== Actors with five or more nominations for motion picture performances ====
Actor/Actress	Total nominations	Total awards
Denzel Washington	16	5
Jamie Foxx	13	4
Chiwetel Ejiofor	10	3
Viola Davis	12	4
Samuel L. Jackson	9	2
Queen Latifah	7	2
Octavia Spencer	8	1
Maya Rudolph	10	1
Kerry Washington	7	1
Idris Elba	9	2
Don Cheadle	7	2
Angela Bassett	9	2
Zoe Saldaña	8	1
Taraji P. Henson	7	1
Rosario Dawson	6	0
Morgan Freeman	6	2
Lupita Nyong’o	6	3
Forest Whitaker	6	1
Jeffrey Wright	7	2
Sanaa Lathan	5	2
Nia Long	5	1
Nate Parker	5	0
Naomie Harris	5	2
Laurence Fishburne	5	0
Kimberly Elise	5	2
Halle Berry	6	1
Gugu Mbatha-Raw	5	1
Derek Luke	5	2
Chadwick Boseman	6	2
Tessa Thompson	6	3
LaKeith Stanfield	6	0
Daniel Kaluuya	7	3
Will Smith	5	1
Gabrielle Union	6	1
Keke Palmer	5	1
Janelle Monae	5	1
Michael B. Jordan	5	2
Jonathan Majors	5	0

=== Television ===
==== Actors with multiple awards for television performances ====
- D - indicates a winning role in drama categories
- C - indicates a winning role in comedy categories
- M/LS - indicates a winning role in television movie, mini-series or limited series categories
- Years Italicized - Honored at Black Reel Awards Film honors (2000 - 2017)

Actor/Actress	Leading Role	Supporting Role	Guest Role	Total awards	Total nominations
Regina King	Seven Seconds (M/LS - 2018); Watchmen (M/LS - 2020)	American Crime (M/LS - 2016, 2017, 2017)		5	7
Sterling K. Brown	This Is Us (D - 2017, 2018, 2020, 2022)	The People v. O. J. Simpson: American Crime Story (M/LS - 2017)		5	9
Issa Rae	Insecure (C - 2017, 2018, 2019, 2020)			4	7
Cicely Tyson	The Trip to Bountiful (M/LS - 2015)	A Lesson Before Dying (M/LS - 2000); The Rosa Parks Story (M/LS - 2003)	How to Get Away with Murder (D - 2020)	4	6
Rutina Wesley	Queen Sugar (D - 2017, 2018, 2019)			3	5
Jenifer Lewis		Black-ish (C - 2017, 2018, 2019)		3	7
Don Cheadle	A Lesson Before Dying (M/LS - 2000); Black Monday (C - 2019, 2020)			3	5
Thandiwe Newton		Westworld (D - 2017, 2020)		2	3
Susan Kelechi Watson		This Is Us (D - 2018, 2019, 2022)		3	6
Ron Cephas Jones		This Is Us (D - 2017)	This Is Us (D - 2018)	2	6
Phylicia Rashad			Empire (D - 2018); This Is Us (D - 2019,2021); Diarra From Detroit (C - 2024)	4	9
Katt Williams			Atlanta (C - 2018); Black-ish (C - 2019)	2	2
Jeffrey Wright		Angels in America (M/LS - 2004); Lackawanna Blues (M/LS - 2006)		2	6
Donald Glover	Atlanta (C - 2017, 2018,2022)			3	6
Courtney B. Vance	The People v. O. J. Simpson: American Crime Story (M/LS - 2017)	Let It Shine (M/LS - 2013)	Lovecraft Country (D- 2021)	3	5
Blair Underwood	Self Made: Inspired by the Life of Madam C. J. Walker (M/LS - 2020)	The Trip to Bountiful (M/LS - 2015)		2	3
Titus Burgess		Unbreakable Kimmy Schmidt (C - 2017, 2019)		2	4
Anika Noni Rose	The Watsons Go to Birmingham (M/LS - 2014)	A Day Late and a Dollar Short (M/LS - 2015)		2	4
Angela Bassett	Ruby's Bucket of Blood (M/LS - 2002); The Rosa Parks Story (M/LS - 2003)			2	9
Alfre Woodard		The Water is Wide (M/LS - 2007); Steel Magnolias (M/LS - 2013)		2	6
Dave Chappelle			Saturday Night Live (C- 2017, 2021)	2	2
Michael K. Williams		When They See Us (M/LS - 2019); Lovecraft Country (D- 2021)		2	5
Zendaya	Euphoria (D-2020,2022)			2	2
Quinta Brunson	Abbott Elementary (C- 2022, 2023)		A Black Lady Sketch Show (C- 2022)	3	5
Wood Harris		The New Edition Story (M/LS - 2017); Winning Time: The Rise of the Lakers Dynasty (D - 2022)		2	3
Sanaa Lathan	Shots Fired (M/LS - 2019)		Succession (D - 2022)	2	5
Giancarlo Esposito		Godfather of Harlem (D - 2020); Better Call Saul (D - 2023)		2	11
Taraji P. Henson	Taken From Me: The Tiffany Rubin Story (M/LS - 2012)		Abbott Elementary (C - 2023)	2	4
Niecy Nash	When They See Us (M/LS - 2019)	Dahmer - Monster: The Jeffrey Dahmer Story (M/LS - 2023)		2	4
David Oyelowo	Nightingale (M/LS - 2016); Lawmen:Bass Reeves (M/LS - 2024)			2	5
Idris Elba	Luther (M/LS - 2012); Hijack (D - 2024)			2	5
Janelle James		Abbott Elementary (C- 2022, 2024)		3	5
Michaela Coel	I May Destroy You (M/LS- 2021)		Mr. & Mrs. Smith (D- 2024)	2	5

==== Actors with five or more nominations for television performances ====
Actor/Actress	Total nominations	Total awards
Sterling K. Brown	9	5
Angela Bassett	9	2
Regina King	7	5
Phylicia Rashad	9	4
Lynn Whitfield	7	1
Jenifer Lewis	7	3
Jeffrey Wright	6	2
Idris Elba	7	2
Cicely Tyson	6	4
Alfre Woodard	6	2
Viola Davis	6	0
Tracee Ellis Ross	7	0
Rutina Wesley	5	3
Regina Hall	8	0
Laurence Fishburne	6	0
Issa Rae	7	4
Carmen Ejogo	5	1
Andre Braugher	5	1
Giancarlo Esposito	11	2
Anthony Anderson	6	1
Aunjanue Ellis	6	1
Michael K. Williams	5	2
Rosario Dawson	8	0
Yvonne Orji	5	1
Susan Kelechi Watson	6	3
Ron Cephas Jones	6	2
Queen Latifah	7	1
Kofi Siriboe	5	0
Don Cheadle	6	3
Donald Glover	6	3
Orlando Jones	5	1
Delroy Lindo	5	0
Kerry Washington	5	1
Forest Whitaker	5	1
Courtney B. Vance	5	3
Loretta Devine	5	0
Michaela Coel	5	2
Orlando Jones	5	1
Quinta Brunson	5	3
Sanaa Lathan	5	2

== See also ==
- Black Filmmakers Hall of Fame
- Black Reel Awards for Television
