= 11th Annual Black Reel Awards =

Film-industry awards in 2011

11th Black Reel Awards
- Date: February 10, 2011
- Location: Washington, D.C.

The 2011 Black Reel Awards, which annually recognize and celebrate the achievements of black people in feature, independent and television films, took place in Washington, D.C., on February 10, 2011. Tyler Perry's For Colored Girls broke the record for most nominations with 14. This was the first ceremony where no Oscar-nominated performances were nominated.

== Winners and nominees ==
Winners are listed first and highlighted in bold.

Best Film	Best Director
**Night Catches Us**; The Book of Eli; Brooklyn's Finest; For Colored Girls; Just Wright	**Albert Hughes and Allen Hughes – The Book of Eli**; Antoine Fuqua – Brooklyn's Finest; Tanya Hamilton – Night Catches Us; Sanaa Hamri – Just Wright; Tyler Perry – For Colored Girls
Best Actor	Best Actress
**Anthony Mackie – Night Catches Us**; Don Cheadle – Brooklyn's Finest; Jaden Smith – The Karate Kid; Denzel Washington – The Book of Eli; Denzel Washington – Unstoppable	**Kerry Washington – Night Catches Us**; Kimberly Elise – For Colored Girls; Queen Latifah – Just Wright; Thandiwe Newton – For Colored Girls; Anika Noni Rose – For Colored Girls
Best Supporting Actor	Best Supporting Actress
**Wesley Snipes – Brooklyn's Finest**; Sean Combs – Get Him to the Greek; Laurence Fishburne – Predators; Brandon T. Jackson – Percy Jackson & the Olympians: The Lightning Thief; Samuel L. Jackson – Mother and Child	**Phylicia Rashad – For Colored Girls**; Viola Davis – Eat Pray Love; Shareeka Epps – Mother and Child; Janet Jackson – For Colored Girls; Kerry Washington – For Colored Girls
Best Screenplay, Adapted or Original	Best Feature Documentary
**Tanya Hamilton – Night Catches Us**; Peter Allen, Gabriel Casseus, Avery Duff and John Luessenhop – Takers; Michael Elliott – Just Wright; Michael C. Martin – Brooklyn's Finest; Tyler Perry – For Colored Girls	**Waiting for "Superman" – Lesley Chilcott**; The Lottery – Madeleine Sackler; Why We Laugh: Black Comedians on Black Comedy – Robert Townsend; My Mic Sounds Nice: The Truth About Women in Hip Hop – Ava DuVernay
Best Breakthrough Performance	Best Ensemble
**Tessa Thompson – For Colored Girls**; Amari Cheatom – Night Catches Us; Yaya DaCosta – The Kids Are All Right; Omari Hardwick – For Colored Girls; Zoë Kravitz – It's Kind of a Funny Story	**Robi Reed – For Colored Girls**; Suzanne Smith and Mary Vernieu – Brooklyn's Finest; Lois J. Drabkin – Night Catches Us; Lisa Hayes Kroeger and David Rapaport – Takers; Denise Chamian – Unstoppable
Best Original or Adapted Song	Outstanding Original Score
**"Shine" from Waiting for "Superman" – John Legend**; "Champion" from Just Wright – Queen Latifah; "I Know Who I Am" from For Colored Girls – Leona Lewis; "Never Say Never" from The Karate Kid – Justin Bieber and Jaden Smith; "Run This Town" from Brooklyn's Finest – Jay Z, Rihanna and Kanye West	**The Roots – Night Catches Us**; James Horner – The Karate Kid; Atticus Ross and Leopold Ross – The Book of Eli; Marcelo Zarvos – Brooklyn's Finest; Aaron Zigman – For Colored Girls
Best Independent Feature	Outstanding Independent Documentary
**Preacher's Kid – Stan Foster**; Black Venus – Abdellatif Kechiche; Finding God in the City of Angels – Jennifer Jessum; Kings of the Evening – Andrew P. Jones; Toe to Toe – Emily Abt	**For the Best and for the Onion – Sani Elhadj Magori**; Gefilte Fish – Shelly Kling; One of These Mornings – Valery Lyman
Outstanding Independent Short Film
**Katrina's Son – Ya'Ke Smith**; Stag & Doe – Daniel Patterson; Cred – Sherman Payne
