= The Alchemist Cookbook =

2016 film directed by Joel Potrykus

- Film poster
- Directed by: Joel Potrykus
- Written by: Joel Potrykus
- Produced by: Bryan Reisberg; Andrew D. Corkin; Ashley Young; Joel Potrykus
- Starring: Ty Hickson; Amari Cheatom
- Cinematography: Adam J. Minnick
- Edited by: Joel Potrykus
- Music by: Brian Harding; Andrew Miller
- Production company: Oscilloscope Laboratories
- Distributed by: Oscilloscope Laboratories
- Release dates: March 13, 2016 (SXSW); October 7, 2016 (United States)
- Running time: 82 minutes
- Country: United States
- Language: English

The Alchemist Cookbook is a 2016 American horror film directed by Joel Potrykus. The film was released on the 7th of October 2016 in New York City. The film follows an outcast who isolates himself from society to practice alchemy, but as his mind deteriorates, his chemistry turns to black magic.

The Alchemist Cookbook was released on an alternate release strategy, as a pay what you want film, in both theatres and on BitTorrent bundle. The film was an official selection at the 2016 South by Southwest Film Festival.

== Plot ==
Sean lives in a caravan in a forest, accompanied only by his cat, Kaspar. Sean’s simple lifestyle is centered on experimenting with various chemicals and substances according to an old alchemy book, with seemingly no success, though there are mysterious sounds from the forest. Sean runs out of the pills he regularly takes. He becomes increasingly nervous about being watched and locks himself in the caravan with an axe. He receives a visitor, but it is only his friend Cortez, who has come to deliver supplies. The resupply of Sean’s pills cannot be found; Cortez refuses to make another three hour round trip to retrieve them from his home.

Without his pills Sean’s mental stability deteriorates and he grows increasingly paranoid and frightened of his surroundings. After unsuccessful experiments with a dead mouse, he sets animal traps in the forest. He goes out onto the lake on his rowboat, where he proclaims that he intends to summon a demon that night, which he will give whatever it wants, including his body and teeth. Sean’s trap catches a possum, which he takes home and feeds. That night, he makes a fire and calls out to "Belial", saying he repents his human form, and reads Latin from his book of alchemy. Upon hearing loud bellowing sounds from the forest, he rushes back inside. He lights dozens of candles and continues reading from his book. The possum makes strange sounds before Sean kills it with a knife.

Cortez arrives and is shocked at the dead possum and the state of the cabin. However, he is on the run and intends to stay with Sean for a time. Sean is agitated by this and tells him to leave, threatening Cortez with his knife. Cortez leaves, feeling betrayed. Later Sean finds Cortez’s car in the forest, destroyed, Cortez's cross necklace, and a tooth embedded in a tree carved with the words "PAY UP." That night, Sean is burning his papers on alchemy when Cortez stumbles over, covered in blood and eyes glowing. Switching between awareness and fear of his situation to speaking in a deep, warped voice, he tells Sean of the devil in the forest which feels owed all that Sean owns.

The next day Sean finds Cortez’s dead body and buries him. Later, in his cabin, Sean extracts his own teeth with pliers. That night he calls out to the demon, telling it he has his tooth. A loud bellowing answers; later, Sean sits in his cabin covered in blood. Crying, shaking, and seemingly insane, he smashes his head into a mirror until it shatters, drinks chemicals from test tubes, and eats the raw organs of the dead possum. He realizes that his cat is missing and goes out to search for it. Calling for Kaspar, his voice begins to sound like the howls of the demon.

Sean takes his bag and a large rock and submerges himself in the lake. A little later he emerges from the water and, initially ecstatic, exclaims that he has defeated the demon. His triumph is short lived, as he hears the whimper of his cat and the howl of the demon in the forest.

== Cast ==
The cast only contains two human characters starring Ty Hickson as Sean and Amari Cheatom as Cortez. Other notable characters include the Cat Kaspar and a possum. The cast is notable as it consists of only African American actors, a conscious choice to “take the white people out of the movie” by the director Joel Potrykus.

== Production ==
=== Pre-production ===
Potrykus' inspiration for the film came after seeing an old friend who didn't recognise him. Confused after his old friend didn't react after calling out to him, Potrykus thought he may just be a doppelganger. This gave him the idea for a film with a doppelganger who lived out in the woods. This initial idea eventually evolved into the script for the film of a weird guy in the woods practising alchemy. Potrykus admitted the film was inspired by the movie, The Evil Dead, a film which Potrykus idolised throughout high school. Other influences and inspirations for the film include Jim Jarmusch and films by Michael Haneke. Potrykus listened to Come on Pilgrim by the Pixies during production of the film and Sean even quotes some lyrics in the movie.

=== Production ===
The film was produced by Oscilloscope Laboratories. The Alchemist Cookbook was Potrykus’ third film after Ape and Buzzard and the first in the genre of horror. The film was the first film in which Joel Potrykus cast Professional actors as opposed to non-actors who Potrykus knew. On the first day of filming, prior to first meeting Ty Hickson, Potrykus was very nervous, and after taking an anxiety pill he passed out. Ty Hickson and Amari Cheatom were initially unfamiliar with Potrykus’ directing style and so this took some period of adjustment. Potrykus was able to give the pair the freedom to improvise and incorporate their own elements without always sticking to the script. The film was shot exclusively in the forests of West Michigan’s Allegan County. This provided a challenge for all involved as there was a lot of ticks. The Alchemy book used by Sean was made by Potrykus specifically for the film. The title of the film and book is a reference to "The Anarchist Cookbook" a book which is basically an instruction manual for committing crimes. Potrykus describes this reference as giving the middle finger to society.

== Themes ==
The film examines the theme of mental health and its role in society. Tom Keogh of the Seattle Times says that "there are obvious signs of mental illness in his behaviour". Potrykus explores this through the voices, shapes and sounds in the forest which "visually suggest the tangled shadows in Sean’s head." There has been much debate if what the viewer sees in the film is real or if it is just a reflection Sean's tortured mental state. This is the intention of the director Joel Potrykus, to keep the film intentionally ambiguous to encourage thinking on the viewers behalf. Potrykus further leans into this by disrupting the concept of time and space, removing the conventional ties to reality. The eccentric and erratic behaviour of the protagonist Sean emphasise the mental turmoil and cause the film to venture into the realm of a psychological horror. Furthermore, Potrykus explores the causes and the way that mental health is treated by society, stating that it is difficult to know what an individual may be escaping from in life.

== Cinematic style ==
The film has an unusual structure, broken up into 8 chapters with the director Joel Potrykus describing the different sections of the film like pieces of a puzzle put together by the audience. Potrykus kept the film intentionally cryptic so that the viewer could form their own interpretation. The viewer is never quite sure what is real or just in the head of Sean. This separation into chapters gives the film a disjointed feel in regard to its scenes and dialogue and makes it near plotless. Potrykus incorporates elements of horror and comedy to surprise the viewer and elicit different reactions from each individual viewer. The colour of the film is predominantly brown, red and gold which is supported by the setting of Michigan forest. Potrykus set specific rules for the filming the film saying "if the characters are moving, the camera is moving. If the characters are not moving, the camera is not moving". This gives the viewer the feeling that they are there with the character, immersing them in the scene. The film features a vague grumbling sound from the forest at various stages of the movie. This builds the feeling of unease throughout the film for the viewer. The film is set in a non-specific time period with the characters not having access to modern technology. The film employs modern horror techniques such as speed ramping and frame-skipping which build the tension in the style of a modern horror.

=== Music ===
The soundtrack is very diverse featuring opera music, music from Detroit based rapper Esham and punk pop band The Smoking Popes, as well as Beethoven. Potrykus uses the lyrics in the music in the opening scene to give the viewer an overview on Sean's background.

== Release ==
The film premiered in March 2016 at the South by Southwest Film Festival. The film was then featured at various independent film festivals around the whole world throughout 2016, including at BAMcinemaFest in New York. The film was then officially released in New York and on online on BitTorrent Bundle on the 7th of October. The film was released on an alternate "pay what you want" strategy. Viewers were instructed to pay what they thought the film was worth. This is part of Joel Potrykus’ vision that all films and art should be pay what you want due to its subjectivity.

== Critical response ==
The critical response to the film from critics was generally positive. On Rotten Tomatoes the film has an approval rating of 84% based on 19 reviews.

Ty Hickson received widespread praise for his role in the film. Brooklyn magazine said "Hickson's largely silent performance is superb" and Variety commended Hickson for an "irresistible performance". Critics also commented on the elements of comedy in the film, especially by Amari Cheatom who was described as "hilarious".

Not all reviews were positive, Todd Jorgenson from Cinemalogue.com commented that the films "ambiguity with regard to key details becomes frustrating" and Spanish magazine Cinelipsis described the film as a "complete waste of a horror movie" and that "nothing justifies whatever it was the director tried to do here".
