= Black Reel Award for Outstanding Screenplay, Adapted or Original =

Award presented annually by the Black Reel Awards

Black Reel Award for Outstanding Screenplay
- Awarded for: Outstanding Screenplay
- Country: United States
- Presented by: Black Reel Awards (BRAs)
- First award: Black Reel Awards of 2000
- Most recent winner: Rebecca Hall; Passing (Black Reel Awards of 2022)
- Website: blackreelawards.com

This article lists the winners and nominees for the Black Reel Award for Outstanding Screenplay, Adapted or Original. Geoffrey Fletcher and John Ridley are the only Black Reel Award Screenwriting winners to win Oscars for Best Adapted Screenplay.

== Winners and nominees ==
Winners are listed first and highlighted in bold.

=== 2000s ===
| Year | Writer | Film | Ref |
|---|---|---|---|
2000
| 2000 | **Malcolm D. Lee** | **The Best Man** | |
| 2000 | Todd Boyd and Rick Famuyiwa | The Wood | |
| 2000 | Spike Lee | Summer of Sam | |
2001
| 2001 | **Gregory Allen Howard** | **Remember the Titans** | |
| 2001 | Kwyn Bader | Loving Jezebel | |
| 2001 | Scott Marshall Smith | Men of Honor | |
| 2001 | Spike Lee | Bamboozled | |
| 2001 | Gina Prince-Bythewood | Love & Basketball | |
2002
| 2002 | **Gregory Allen Howard** | **Ali** | |
| 2002 | Mark Brown | Two Can Play That Game | |
| 2002 | Peter Gaulke and Darryl Quarles | Black Knight | |
| 2002 | Gary Hardwick | The Brothers | |
| 2002 | John Singleton | Baby Boy | |
2003
| 2003 | **Antwone Fisher** | **Antwone Fisher** | |
| 2003 | Mark Brown and Don D. Scott | Barbershop | |
| 2003 | Michael Elliot | Brown Sugar | |
| 2003 | Michael Elliott and Jordan Moffet | Like Mike | |
| 2003 | John Ridley | Undercover Brother | |
2004
| 2004 | **B.E. Brauner, Gary Hardwick and James Iver Mattson** | **Deliver Us from Eva** | |
| 2004 | Elizabeth Hunter and Saladin K. Patterson | The Fighting Temptations | |
| 2004 | Ali LeRoi and Chris Rock | Head of State | |
2005
| 2005 | **Mario Van Peebles** | **BAADASSSSS!** | |
| 2005 | Michael Genet and Spike Lee | She Hate Me | |
| 2005 | Shonda Rimes | The Princess Diaries 2: Royal Engagement | |
| 2005 | Don D. Scott | Barbershop 2: Back in Business | |
| 2005 | James L. White | Ray | |
2006
| 2006 | **Norman Vance Jr.** | **Roll Bounce** | |
| 2006 | Rob Hardy | The Gospel | |
| 2006 | Tyler Perry | Diary of a Mad Black Woman | |
2007
| 2007 | **Kriss Turner** | **Something New** | |
| 2007 | Bryan Barber | Idlewild | |
| 2007 | Chris Cleveland and Bettina Gilois | Glory Road | |
| 2007 | Tina Gordon Chism | ATL | |
| 2007 | Tyler Perry | Madea's Family Reunion | |
2008
| 2008 | **Gina Prince-Bythewood** | **The Secret Life of Bees** | |
| 2008 | Darnell Martin | Cadillac Records | |
| 2008 | James McBride | Miracle at St. Anna | |
| 2008 | Tyler Perry | The Family That Preys | |
| 2008 | Tyler Perry | Meet the Browns | |

=== 2010s ===
| Year | Writer | Film | Ref |
|---|---|---|---|
2010
| 2010 | **Geoffrey S. Fletcher** | **Precious** | |
| 2010 | Brian Bird | Not Easily Broken | |
| 2010 | Cheo Hodari Coker and Reggie Rock Bythewood | Notorious | |
| 2010 | John Lee Hancock | The Blind Side | |
| 2010 | Bryon Minms, Scott Sanders and Michael Jai White | Black Dynamite | |
2011
| 2011 | **Tanya Hamilton** | **Night Catches Us** | |
| 2011 | Peter Allen, Gabriel Casseus, John Luessenhop and Avery Duff | Takers | |
| 2011 | Michael Elliot | Just Wright | |
| 2011 | Michael C. Martin | Brooklyn's Finest | |
| 2011 | Tyler Perry | For Colored Girls | |
2012
| 2012 | **Steve McQueen and Abi Morgan** | **Shame** | |
| 2012 | Qasim Basir | Mooz-lum | |
| 2012 | Ava DuVernay | I Will Follow | |
| 2012 | Arelene Gibbs and Elizabeth Hunter | Jumping the Broom | |
| 2012 | Dee Rees | Pariah | |
2013
| 2013 | **Ava DuVernay** | **Middle of Nowhere** | |
| 2013 | Mara Brock Akil | Sparkle | |
| 2013 | Rashida Jones and Will McCormack | Celeste and Jesse Forever | |
| 2013 | Spike Lee and James McBride | Red Hook Summer | |
| 2013 | Aaron McGruder and John Ridley | Red Tails | |
2014
| 2014 | **John Ridley** | **12 Years a Slave** | |
| 2014 | Ryan Coogler | Fruitvale Station | |
| 2014 | Malcolm D. Lee | The Best Man Holiday | |
| 2014 | Kasi Lemmons | Black Nativity | |
| 2014 | Michael Starburry | The Inevitable Defeat of Mister and Pete | |
2015
| 2015 | **Chris Rock** | **Top Five** | |
| 2015 | Gina Prince-Bythewood | Beyond the Lights | |
| 2015 | John Ridley | Jimi: All Is by My Side | |
| 2015 | Misan Sagay | Belle | |
| 2015 | Justin Simien | Dear White People | |
2016
| 2016 | **Ryan Coogler and Aaron Covington** | **Creed** | |
| 2016 | Rick Famuyiwa | Dope | |
| 2016 | Spike Lee and Kevin Willmott | Chi-Raq | |
2017
| 2017 | **Barry Jenkins** | **Moonlight** | |
| 2017 | Don Cheadle and Steven Baigelman | Miles Ahead | |
| 2017 | Nate Parker | The Birth of a Nation | |
| 2017 | Jordan Peele and Alex Rubens | Keanu | |
| 2017 | August Wilson | Fences | |
2018
| 2018 | **Jordan Peele** | **Get Out** | |
| 2018 | Christine T. Berg and Gerard McMurray | Burning Sands | |
| 2018 | Tracy Oliver and Kenya Barris | Girls Trip | |
| 2018 | Dee Rees and Virgil Williams | Mudbound | |
| 2018 | Maggie Betts | Novitiate | |
2019
| 2019 | **Boots Riley** | **Sorry to Bother You** | |
| 2019 | Ryan Coogler & Joe Robert Cole | Black Panther | |
| 2019 | Spike Lee, Kevin Willmott, David Rabinowitz and Charlie Wachtel | BlacKkKlansman | |
| 2019 | Barry Jenkins | If Beale Street Could Talk | |
| 2019 | Steve McQueen & Gillian Flynn | Widows | |

=== 2020s ===
| Year | Writer | Film | Ref |
|---|---|---|---|
2020
| 2020 | **Jordan Peele** | **Us** | |
| 2020 | Chinonye Chukwu | Clemency | |
| 2020 | Ladj Ly, Giordano Gederlini and Alexis Manenti | Les Miserables | |
| 2020 | Lena Waithe | Queen & Slim | |
| 2020 | Julius Onah and JC Lee | Luce | |
2021
| 2021 | **Radha Blank** | **The Forty-Year-Old Version** | |
| 2021 | Shaka King & Will Berson | Judas and the Black Messiah | |
| 2021 | Ruben Santiago-Hudson | Ma Rainey's Black Bottom | |
| 2021 | Kemp Powers | One Night in Miami... | |
| 2021 | Kemp Powers, Pete Docter, & Mike Jones | Soul | |
2022
| 2022 | **Rebecca Hall** | **Passing** | |
| 2022 | Jeymes Samuel & Boaz Yakin | The Harder They Fall | |
| 2022 | Quiara Alegria Hudes | In the Heights | |
| 2022 | Janicza Bravo & Jeremy O. Harris | Zola | |
| 2022 | Nia DaCosta, Jordan Peele & Win Rosenfeld | Candyman | |

== Multiple nominations and wins ==
=== Multiple wins ===
2 Wins

- Gregory Allen Howard
- Jordan Peele

=== Multiple nominations ===
6 Nominations

- Spike Lee

5 Nominations

- Tyler Perry

4 Nominations

- Jordan Peele
- John Ridley

3 Nominations

- Ryan Coogler
- Michael Elliot
- Steve McQueen
- Gina Prince-Bythewood

2 Nominations

- Mark Brown
- Ava DuVernay
- Rick Famuyiwa
- Gregory Allen Howard
- Elizabeth Hunter
- Barry Jenkins
- Malcolm D. Lee
- James McBride
- Kemp Powers
- Dee Rees
- Chris Rock
- Don D. Scott
- Kevin Willmott
