= Black Reel Award for Outstanding Film =

Motion picture award for motion picture

Black Reel Award for Outstanding Motion Picture
- Country: United States
- Presented by: The Black Reel Awards (BRAs)
- First award: Black Reel Awards of 2000
- Most recent winner: Sinners (2026)
- Website: blackreelawards.com

The Black Reel Award for Outstanding Film is one of the Black Reel Awards presented annually. This award goes to the producers of the film. Outstanding Film is the final award of the night at each ceremony. There have been 120 films nominated for Outstanding Film and 24 winners.

== History ==
=== Outstanding Film and Outstanding Director ===
The Black Reel Award for Outstanding Picture and Black Reel Award for Outstanding Director have been closely linked throughout their history. Of the 22 films that have won Outstanding Film, 10 have also been awarded for Outstanding Director. Only six films have been awarded Outstanding Film without receiving an Outstanding Director nomination: The Hurricane directed by Norman Jewison, Ray directed by Taylor Hackford (2005), Crash directed by Paul Haggis (2006), Dreamgirls directed by Bill Condon (2017), The Help directed by Tate Taylor (2012) and Dolemite Is My Name directed by Craig Brewer (2020). Note: These film directors were deemed ineligible for an Outstanding Director nomination due to not being of African-American of African descent.

=== Language and country of origin ===
Only one non-English language film has been nominated in the category: The Intouchables (French, 2013). Five films wholly financed outside of the United States has been nominated for Outstanding Film: Attack the Block (2011), Shame (2011), The Intouchables (2013), Mandela: Long Walk to Freedom (2013) and Belle (2014).

=== Genres ===
The Princess and the Frog, Soul, and Spider-Man: Across the Spider-Verse are the only animated films to be nominated for Outstanding Film. Black Panther remains as the only comic book film to win Outstanding Film; Black Panther: Wakanda Forever and Spider-Man: Across the Spider-Verse are the only other comic book films to be nominated. Get Out became the first horror film to win Outstanding Film and one of three films along with From Hell and Us to be nominated in this category.

Lightning in a Bottle is the only documentary film to win. It won in the first and only winner in the Outstanding Comedy/Musical film at the 5th Annual Black Reel Awards. Standing in the Shadows of Motown, Tupac: Resurrection, Fade to Black and 13th were the other documentaries to be nominated in this category.

Dreamgirls is the only musical to win this category. To date, The Book of Eli and Attack the Block are the only two science fiction films to be nominated for Outstanding Film.

== Winners and nominees ==
Winners are listed first and highlighted in bold.

=== 2000s ===
| Year | Film | Distributor | Producer(s) | Ref |
|---|---|---|---|---|
2000
| 2000 | **The Hurricane** | **Universal Studios** | **Norman Jewison, John Ketchem and Armyan Bernstein** | |
| 2000 | The Best Man | Universal Pictures | Bill Carraro, Sam Kitt and Spike Lee | |
| 2000 | Life | Universal Pictures | Eddie Murphy and Brian Grazer | |
| 2000 | The Wood | Paramount Pictures | David Gale, Albert Berger and Ron Yerxa | |
2001
| 2001 | **Love & Basketball** | **New Line Cinema** | **Spike Lee and Sam Kitt** | |
| 2001 | Bamboozled | New Line Cinema | John Kilik and Spike Lee | |
| 2001 | Girlfight | Screen Gems | Maggie Renzi, Martha Griffin and Sarah Green | |
| 2001 | Men of Honor | 20th Century Fox | Bill Badalato and Robert Teitel | |
| 2001 | Remember the Titans | Walt Disney Pictures | Chad Oman and Jerry Bruckheimer | |
2002
| 2002 | **Training Day** | **Warner Bros. Pictures** | **Bruce Berman and Davis Guggenheim** | |
| 2002 | Ali | Columbia Pictures | Michael Mann, Jon Peters and James Lassiter | |
| 2002 | Baby Boy | Columbia Pictures | John Singleton | |
| 2002 | The Brothers | Screen Gems | Doug McHenry and Paddy Cullen | |
| 2002 | From Hell | 20th Century Fox | Don Murphy, Amy Robinson and Jane Hamsher | |
2003
| 2003 | **Antwone Fisher** | **Fox Searchlight Pictures** | **Denzel Washington, Randa Haines and Todd Black** | |
| 2003 | 25th Hour | Touchstone Pictures | John Kilik, Spike Lee and Julia Chasman | |
| 2003 | Barbershop | Metro-Goldwyn-Mayer | George Tillman Jr., Mark Brown and Robert Teitel | |
| 2003 | Drumline | 20th Century Fox | Timothy M. Bourne, Wendy Finerman and Jody Gerson | |
| 2003 | Standing in the Shadows of Motown | Artisan Entertainment | Paul Justman and Alan Slutsky | |
2004
| 2004 | **Out of Time** | **Metro-Goldwyn-Mayer** | **Neal H. Moritz, Damien Saccani and Jesse Beaton** | |
| 2004 | The Fighting Temptations | Paramount Pictures | Loretha C. Jones, Benny Medina and Jeff Pollack | |
| 2004 | The Italian Job | Paramount Pictures | Donald De Line | |
| 2004 | S.W.A.T. | Columbia Pictures | Neal H. Moritz, Chris Lee and Dan Halsted | |
| 2004 | Tupac: Resurrection | Paramount Pictures | Preston Holmes, Karoyln Ali and Lauren Lazin | |
| 2005 | Drama | | | |
| 2005 | **Ray** | **Universal Pictures** | **Howard Baldwin, Taylor Hackford and Bob Yari** | |
| 2005 | BAADASSSSS! | Sony Pictures Classics | Mario Van Peebles | |
| 2005 | I, Robot | 20th Century Fox | **Topher Dow, Laurence Mark and Wyck Godfrey** | |
| 2005 | Comedy / Musical | | | |
| 2005 | **Lightning in a Bottle** | **Sony Pictures** | **Alex Gibney, Margaret Bodde and Jack Gulick** | |
| 2005 | Barbershop 2: Back in Business | Metro-Goldwyn-Mayer | George Tillman Jr., Robert Teitel and Alex Gartner | |
| 2005 | Fade to Black | Paramount Vantage | Bob Ezrin, Rich Kleiman and Justin Wilkes | |
2006
| 2006 | **Crash** | **Lionsgate** | **Paul Haggis, Cathy Schulman and Bob Yari** | |
| 2006 | Coach Carter | Touchstone Pictures | David Gale, Brian Robbins and Michael Tollin | |
| 2006 | Four Brothers | Columbia Pictures | Lorenzo di Bonaventura | |
| 2006 | Hitch | Columbia Pictures | James Lassiter, Will Smith and Teddy Zee | |
| 2006 | Hustle & Flow | Paramount Classics | John Singleton and Stephanie Allain | |
2007
| 2007 | **Dreamgirls** | **DreamWorks** | **Laurence Mark** | |
| 2007 | Akeelah and the Bee | Warner Bros. | Sid Ganis, Laurence Fishburne and Michael Romersa | |
| 2007 | Inside Man | Universal Pictures | Brian Grazer and Jonathan Filley | |
| 2007 | The Pursuit of Happyness | Columbia Pictures | James Lassiter, Todd Black and Steve Tisch | |
| 2007 | Something New | Focus Features | Stephanie Allain | |
2008
| 2008 | **Cadillac Records** | **TriStar Pictures** | **Andrew Lack and Sofia Sondervan** | |
| 2008 | Miracle at St. Anna | Touchstone Pictures | Spike Lee, Luigi Musini and Roberto Cicutto | |
| 2008 | The Secret Life of Bees | Fox Searchlight Pictures | James Lassiter, Will Smith and Lauren Shuler Donner | |
| 2008 | Seven Pounds | Columbia Pictures | James Lassiter, Will Smith and Steve Tisch | |
| 2008 | Traitor | Overture Films | Don Cheadle, David Hoberman and Todd Lieberman | |

=== 2010s ===
| Year | Film | Distributor | Producer(s) | Ref |
|---|---|---|---|---|
2010
| 2010 | **Precious** | **Lionsgate** | **Lee Daniels, Gary Magness and Sarah Siegel-Magness** | |
| 2010 | American Violet | Samuel Goldwyn Films | Bill Haney | |
| 2010 | The Blind Side | Warner Bros. | Broderick Johnson, Andrew Kosove and Gil Netter | |
| 2010 | Invictus | Warner Bros. | Clint Eastwood, Mace Neufeld and Robert Lorenz | |
| 2010 | The Princess and the Frog | Walt Disney Pictures | Peter Del Vecho | |
2011
| 2011 | **Night Catches Us** | **Magnolia Pictures** | **Jason Orans, Ron Simons and Sean Costello** | |
| 2011 | The Book of Eli | Warner Bros. Pictures | Denzel Washington, Joel Silver and Andrew Kosove | |
| 2011 | Brooklyn's Finest | Overture Films | John Thompson, John Langley and Elle Cohn | |
| 2011 | For Colored Girls | Lionsgate | Tyler Perry, Roger M. Bobb and Paul Hall | |
| 2011 | Just Wright | Fox Searchlight Pictures | Debra Martin Chase, Queen Latifah and Shakim Compere | |
2012
| 2012 | **The Help** | **DreamWorks** | **Chris Columbus, Brunson Green and Michael Baranthan** | |
| 2012 | Attack the Block | Screen Gems | Nira Park and James Wilson | |
| 2012 | Jumping the Broom | TriStar Pictures | Elizabeth Hunter, Tracy Edmonds and T.D. Jakes | |
| 2012 | Pariah | Focus Features | Nekisha Cooper | |
| 2012 | Shame | Fox Searchlight Pictures | Emile Sherman and Iain Canning | |
2013
| 2013 | **Beasts of the Southern Wild** | **Fox Searchlight Pictures** | **Josh Penn, Dan Javey and Michael Gottwald** | |
| 2013 | Django Unchained | The Weinstein Company | Reginald Hudlin, Stacey Shear and Pilar Savone | |
| 2013 | Flight | Paramount Pictures | Robert Zemeckis, Steve Starkey and Laurie MacDonald | |
| 2013 | The Intouchables | The Weinstein Company | Nicolas Duval-Adassovsky, Yann Zenou and Laurent Zeitoun | |
| 2013 | Middle of Nowhere | AAFRM | Paul Garnes, Ava DuVernay and Howard Barish | |
2014
| 2014 | **12 Years a Slave** | **Fox Searchlight Pictures** | **Brad Pitt, Dede Gardner and Jeremy Kleiner** | |
| 2014 | 42 | Warner Bros. Pictures | Thomas Tull | |
| 2014 | The Butler | The Weinstein Company | Pamela Oas Williams, Laura Ziskin and Lee Daniels | |
| 2014 | Fruitvale Station | The Weinstein Company | Nina Yang Bongiovi and Forest Whitaker | |
| 2014 | Mandela: Long Walk to Freedom | 20th Century Fox | David M. Thompson and Anant Singh | |
2015
| 2015 | **Selma** | **Paramount Pictures** | **Christian Colson, Oprah Winfrey and Dede Gardner** | |
| 2015 | Belle | Fox Searchlight Pictures | Damian Jones | |
| 2015 | Beyond the Lights | Relativity Media | Stephanie Allain, Reggie Rock Bythewood and Ryan Kavanaugh | |
| 2015 | Dear White People | Lionsgate | Effie Brown, Ann Le and Julia Lebedev | |
| 2015 | Top Five | Paramount Pictures | Scott Rudin and Eli Bush | |
2016
| 2016 | **Creed** | **Warner Bros. Pictures** | **Irwin Winkler, Robert Chartoff and Charles Winkler** | |
| 2016 | Beasts of No Nation | Bleecker Street | Amy Kaufman, Cary Joji Fukunaga and Daniela Taplin Lundberg | |
| 2016 | Chi-Raq | Roadside Attractions | Spike Lee | |
| 2016 | Concussion | Columbia Pictures | Ridley Scott, Giannina Facio and David Woltroff | |
| 2016 | Straight Outta Compton | Universal Pictures | Ice Cube, Tomica Woods-Wright and Matt Alvarez | |
2017
| 2017 | **Moonlight** | **A24** | **Dede Gardner, Jeremy Kleiner and Adele Romanski** | |
| 2017 | 13th | Netflix | Spencer Averick, Howard Barish and Ava DuVernay | |
| 2017 | Fences | Paramount Pictures | Todd Black, Scott Rudin and Denzel Washington | |
| 2017 | Loving | Focus Features | Nancy Buirski, Ged Doherty, Colin Firth, Sarah Green, Peter Saraf and Marc Turtletaub | |
| 2017 | Manchester by the Sea | Roadside Attractions | Lauren Beck, Matt Damon, Chris Moore, Kimberly Steward and Kevin J. Walsh | |
2018
| 2018 | **Get Out** | **Universal Pictures** | **Sean McKittrick, Jason Blum, Edward H. Hamm Jr. and Jordan Peele** | |
| 2018 | Detroit | Annapurna Pictures | Kathryn Bigelow, Mark Boal, Matthew Budman, Megan Ellison and Colin Wilson | |
| 2018 | Girls Trip | Universal Pictures | Malcolm D. Lee and Will Packer | |
| 2018 | Marshall | Open Road Films | Reginald Hudlin, Jonathan Sanger and Paula Wagner | |
| 2018 | Mudbound | Netflix | Carl Effenson, Sally Jo Effenson, Cassian Elwes, Charles King, Christopher Lemole, Kim Roth and Tim Zajaros | |
2019
| 2019 | **Black Panther** | **Walt Disney Studios Motion Pictures** | **Kevin Feige** | |
| 2019 | BlacKkKlansman | Focus Features | Jason Blum, Spike Lee, Raymond Mansfield, Sean McKittrick, Jordan Peele, and Shaun Redick | |
| 2019 | Green Book | Universal Pictures | Jim Burke, Brian Hayes Currie, Peter Farrelly, Nick Vallelonga, and Charles B. Wessler | |
| 2019 | If Beale Street Could Talk | Annapurna Pictures | Megan Ellison, Dede Gardner, Jeremy Kleiner, Adele Romanski, Sara Murphy, and Barry Jenkins | |
| 2019 | Widows | 20th Century Fox | Steve McQueen, Iain Canning, Emile Sherman, and Arnon Milchan | |

=== 2020s ===
| Year | Film | Distributor | Producer(s) | Ref |
|---|---|---|---|---|
2020
| 2020 | **Dolemite Is My Name** | **Netflix** | **Eddie Murphy**, **John Davis** and **John Fox** | |
| 2020 | Just Mercy | Warner Bros. Pictures | Asher Goldstein and Gil Netter | |
| 2020 | Queen & Slim | Universal Pictures | Melina Matsoukas, Lena Waithe, Pamela Addy, Michelle Knudsen, Brad Weston and James Frey | |
| 2020 | Us | Universal Pictures | Jordan Peele, Sean McKittrick, Ian Cooper and Jason Blum | |
| 2020 | Waves | A24 | Trey Edward Schults, Kevin Turen and James Wilson | |
2021
| 2021 | **Judas and the Black Messiah** | **Warner Bros. Pictures** | **Shaka King**, **Charles D. King** and **Shaka King** | |
| 2021 | Da 5 Bloods | Netflix | Spike Lee, Lloyd Levin, Jon Kilik and Beatriz Levin | |
| 2021 | Ma Rainey's Black Bottom | Netflix | Denzel Washington, Todd Black and Dany Wolf | |
| 2021 | One Night in Miami... | Amazon Studios | Keith Calder, Jess Wu Calder & Jody Klein | |
| 2021 | Soul | Walt Disney Studios Motion Pictures | Dana Murray | |
2022
| 2022 | **King Richard** | **Warner Bros.** | **Will Smith**, **Tim White** & **Trevor White** | |
| 2022 | The Harder They Fall | Netflix | Lawrence Bender, Jay-Z, James Lassiter and Jeymes Samuel | |
| 2022 | Passing | Netflix | Nina Yang Bongiovi, Forest Whitaker, Rebecca Hall & Margot Hand | |
| 2022 | The Tragedy of Macbeth | A24 | Joel Coen, Frances McDormand, Robert Graf | |
| 2022 | West Side Story | 20th Century Studios | Steven Spielberg, Kristie Macosko Krieger, Kevin McCollum | |
2023
| 2023 | **The Woman King** | **Sony Pictures** | **Maria Bello, Viola Davis, Cathy Schulman, and Julius Tennon** | |
| 2023 | Black Panther: Wakanda Forever | Walt Disney Studios Motion Pictures | Kevin Feige and Nate Moore | |
| 2023 | Devotion | Sony Pictures | Molly Smith, Rachel Smith, Thad Luckinbill, and Trent Luckinbill | |
| 2023 | Nope | Universal Pictures | Jordan Peele and Ian Cooper | |
| 2023 | Till | United Artists Releasing | Keith Beauchamp, Barbara Broccoli, Whoopi Goldberg, Michael Reilly, and Thomas Levine | |
2024
| 2024 | **American Fiction** | **Amazon MGM Studios** | **Ben LeClair, Nikos Karamigios, Cord Jefferson, and Jermaine Johnson** | |
| 2024 | The Color Purple | Warner Bros. Pictures | Oprah Winfrey, Steven Spielberg, Scott Sanders, and Quincy Jones | |
| 2024 | Origin | Neon | Paul Garnes and Ava DuVernay | |
| 2024 | Rustin | Netflix | Bruce Cohen, Tonia Davis, and George C. Wolfe | |
| 2024 | Spider-Man: Across the Spider-Verse | Sony Pictures | Phil Lord, Christopher Miller, Amy Pascal, and Avi Arad | |
2025
| 2025 | **Nickel Boys** | **Amazon MGM Studios** | **Joslyn Barnes, Dede Gardner, Jeremy Kleiner and David Levin** | |
| 2025 | Challengers | Amazon MGM Studios | Luca Guadagnino, Rachel O'Connor, Amy Pascal and Zendaya | |
| 2025 | Exhibiting Forgiveness | Roadside Attractions | Stephanie Allain, Derek Cianfrance, Sean Cotton, Titus Kaphar and Jamie Patricof | |
| 2025 | The Piano Lesson | Netflix | Todd Black and Denzel Washington | |
| 2025 | Sing Sing | A24 | Clint Bentley, Greg Kwedar and Monique Walton | |
2026
| 2026 | **Sinners** | **Warner Bros. Pictures** | **Zinzi Coogler, Sev Ohanian, Ryan Coogler** | |
| 2026 | Hedda | Amazon MGM Studios | Dede Gardner, Jeremy Kleiner, Gabrielle Nadig, Nia DaCosta, and Tessa Thompson | |
| 2026 | Highest 2 Lowest | A24 / Apple Original Films | Todd Black and Jason Michael Berman | |
| 2026 | One of Them Days | Sony Pictures Releasing | Issa Rae, Deniese Davis, Sara Rastogi, James Lopez, and Poppy Hanks | |
| 2026 | Wicked: For Good | Universal Pictures | Marc Platt and David Stone | |

== Multiple nominations and wins ==
=== Multiple wins ===
3 wins

- Dede Gardner

2 wins

- Jeremy Kleiner
- Cathy Schulman

=== Multiple nominations ===
8 nominations

- Spike Lee

6 nominations

- Todd Black
- Dede Gardner
- James Lassiter

5 nominations

- Jeremy Kleiner
- Will Smith
- Denzel Washington

4 nominations

- Stephanie Allain
- Jordan Peele

3 nominations

- Jason Blum
- Ava DuVernay
- David Gale
- Jon Kilik
- Sean McKittrick
- Robert Teitel

2 nominations

- Howard Barish
- Nina Yang Bongiovi
- Jason Blumenthal
- Iain Canning
- Don Cheadle
- Ian Cooper
- Lee Daniels
- John Davis
- Megan Ellison
- Kevin Feige
- Paul Garnes
- Brian Grazer
- Reginald Hudlin
- Broderick Johnson
- Charles D. King
- Andrew A. Kosove
- Laurence Mark
- Steve McQueen
- Arnon Milchan
- Neal H. Moritz
- Eddie Murphy
- Gil Netter
- Amy Pascal
- Adele Romanski
- Scott Rudin
- Cathy Schulman
- Emile Sherman
- John Singleton
- Jeffrey Silver
- Steven Spielberg
- George Tillman Jr.
- Steve Tisch
- Lena Waithe
- Forest Whitaker
- James Wilson
- Oprah Winfrey

== Production companies with multiple nominations and wins ==
| Production Company | Nominations | Wins |
|---|---|---|
| Warner Bros. Pictures | 12 | 4 |
| Universal Pictures | 13 | 3 |
| Paramount Pictures | 11 | 1 |
| Netflix | 9 | 1 |
| Searchlight Pictures | 6 | 3 |
| Sony Pictures Releasing | 7 | 2 |
| Walt Disney Pictures | 6 | 2 |
| A24 | 6 | 1 |
| Columbia Pictures | 6 | 0 |
| Amazon MGM Studios | 5 | 2 |
| Lionsgate | 5 | 2 |
| 20th Century Fox / 20th Century Studios | 5 | 0 |
| The Weinstein Company | 5 | 0 |
| Focus Features | 4 | 0 |
| MGM | 3 | 1 |
| New Line Cinema | 3 | 1 |
| Roadside Attractions | 3 | 0 |
| Screen Gems | 3 | 0 |
| New Line Cinema | 2 | 1 |
| Overture Films | 2 | 0 |
| Annapurna Pictures | 2 | 0 |
| TriStar Pictures | 2 | 0 |
