= African-American Film Critics Association Awards 2010 =

Annual US film awards ceremony

8th African-American Film Critics Association Awards

Highlights
- Best Picture: The Social Network

Winners for the 2010 African-American Film Critics Association.

== Best Picture ==
Winner: The Social Network

Top 10 Pictures:

1. The Social Network
2. The King's Speech
3. Inception
4. Black Swan
5. Night Catches Us
6. The Fighter
7. Frankie & Alice
8. Blood Done Sign My Name
9. Get Low
10. For Colored Girls

== Other categories ==
Category	Winner	Film
Best Director	Christopher Nolan	Inception
Best Actor	Mark Wahlberg	The Fighter
Best Actress	Halle Berry	Frankie & Alice
Best Supporting Actor	Michael Ealy	For Colored Girls
Best Supporting Actress	Kimberly Elise	For Colored Girls
Best Screenplay	Tanya Hamilton	Night Catches Us
