= Black Reel Award for Outstanding Director =

Award presented annually by the Black Reel Awards

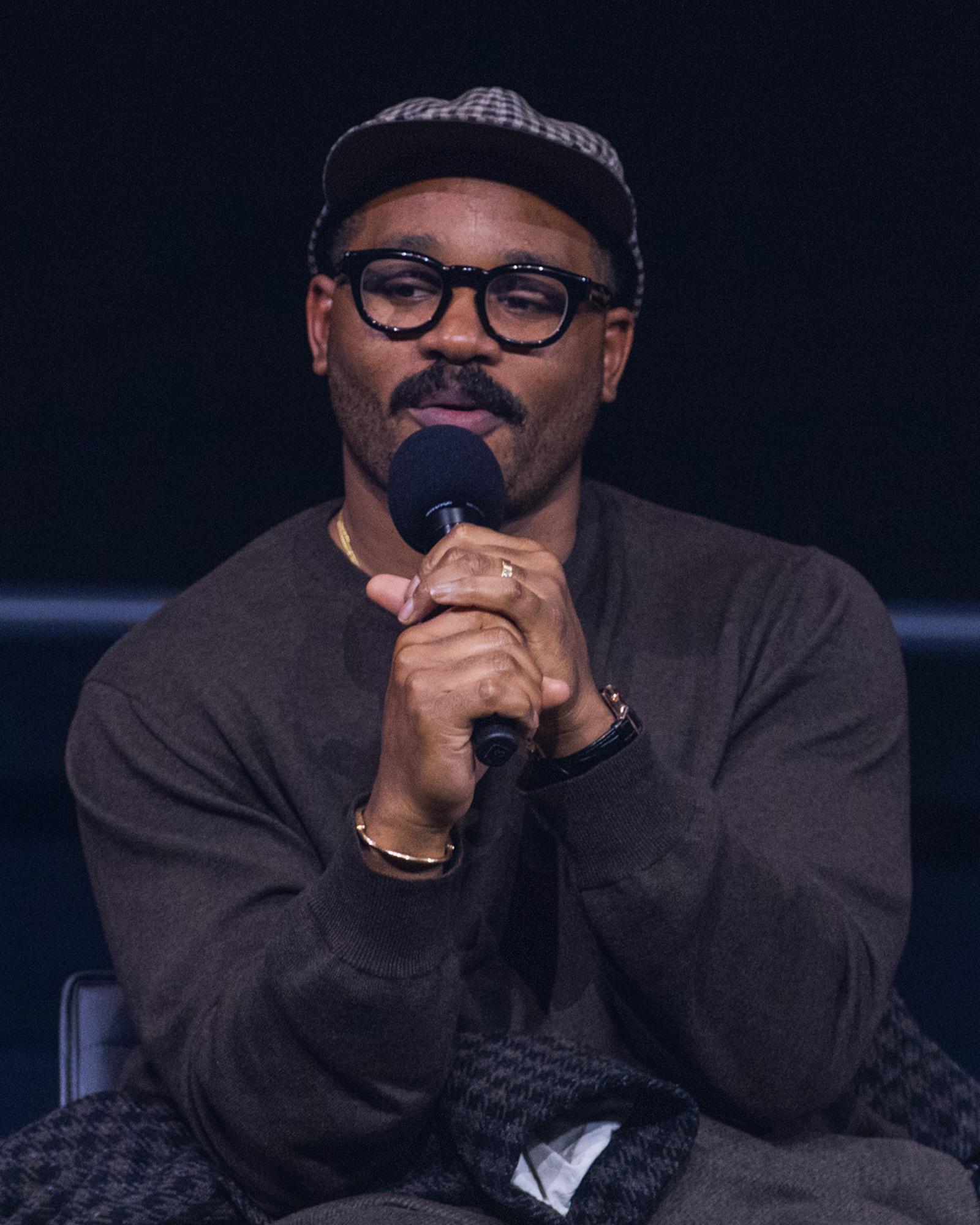
- The 2026 recipient: Ryan Coogler
- Awarded for: Outstanding Director
- Country: United States
- Presented by: Black Reel Awards (BRAs)
- First award: 2000 (to Malcolm D. Lee for The Best Man)
- Most recent winner: Ryan Coogler; Sinners (2026)

Highlights
- Most awards: Ryan Coogler / Gina Prince-Bythewood (3)
- Most nominations: Spike Lee (12)
- Website: blackreelawards.com

The Black Reel Award for Outstanding Director is an award presented annually by the Black Reel Awards (BRA). It is given in honor of a film director who has exhibited outstanding directing while working in the film industry.

== History ==
Director, Malcolm D. Lee took home the first award for The Best Man at the 1st Annual Black Reel Awards.

The Black Reel Awards for Outstanding Director and Black Reel Award for Outstanding Film has been closely linked throughout their history. Out of the 22 films that have been awarded Outstanding Film, 10 have also been awarded Outstanding Director.

Since its inception, the award has been given to 18 directors or directing teams. Ava DuVernay, Ryan Coogler, Gina Prince-Bythewood, Jordan Peele & Steve McQueen has received the most awards in this category with two. Spike Lee has been nominated eleven times, more than any other individual. At age 29, Ryan Coogler became the youngest director to win this award for his work on Creed. Thomas Carter holds the record for the oldest director to win at 52 for Coach Carter.

Brothers, Albert Hughes & Allen Hughes are the only directing team to share this award as they won for The Book of Eli at the 11th Annual Black Reel Awards. Gina Prince-Bythewood became the first woman to be nominated and win in this category for Love & Basketball.

== Winners and nominees ==
Winners are listed first and highlighted in bold.

=== 2000s ===
Year	Director	Film	Ref
2000
2000	**Malcolm D. Lee**	**The Best Man**	
2000	Rick Famuyiwa	The Wood	
2000	Spike Lee	Summer of Sam	
2001
2001	**Gina Prince-Bythewood**	**Love & Basketball**	
2001	Kwyn Bader	Loving Jezebel	
2001	Albert Hughes and Allen Hughes	American Pimp	
2001	Spike Lee	Bamboozled	
2001	John Singleton	Shaft	
2002
2002	**Antoine Fuqua**	**Training Day**	
2002	Thomas Carter	Save the Last Dance	
2002	Gary Hardwick	The Brothers	
2002	Albert Hughes and Allen Hughes	From Hell	
2002	John Singleton	Baby Boy	
2003
2003	**Denzel Washington**	**Antwone Fisher**	
2003	Malcolm D. Lee	Undercover Brother	
2003	Spike Lee	25th Hour	
2003	Charles Stone III	Drumline	
2003	Tim Story	Barbershop	
2004
2004	**F. Gary Gray**	**The Italian Job**	
2004	Carl Franklin	Out of Time	
2004	Antoine Fuqua	Tears of the Sun	
2004	Gary Hardwick	Deliver Us From Eva	
2004	John Singleton	2 Fast 2 Furious	
2005
2005	**Mario Van Peebles**	**BAADASSSSS!**	
2005	Ernest Dickerson	Never Die Alone	
2005	Antoine Fuqua	Lighting in a Bottle	
2005	Spike Lee	She Hate Me	
2005	Charles Stone III	Mr. 3000	
2006
2006	**Thomas Carter**	**Coach Carter**	
2006	Malcolm D. Lee	Roll Bounce	
2006	John Singleton	Four Brothers	
2006	Tim Story	Fantastic Four	
2007
2007	**Spike Lee**	**Inside Man**	
2007	Bryan Barber	Idlewild	
2007	Sanaa Hamri	Something New	
2007	Clark Johnson	The Sentinel	
2007	Chris Robinson	ATL	
2008
2008	**Gina Prince-Bythewood**	**The Secret Life of Bees**	
2008	Malcolm D. Lee	Soul Men	
2008	Spike Lee	Miracle at St. Anna	
2008	Darnell Martin	Cadillac Records	
2008	Gabriele Muccino	Seven Pounds	

=== 2010s ===
Year	Director	Film	Ref
2010
2010	**Lee Daniels**	**Precious**	
2010	Bill Duke	Not Easily Broken	
2010	Spike Lee	Passing Strange	
2010	Scott Sanders	Black Dynamite	
2010	George Tillman Jr.	Notorious	
2011
2011	**Albert Hughes and Allen Hughes**	**The Book of Eli**	
2011	Antoine Fuqua	Brooklyn's Finest	
2011	Tanya Hamilton	Night Catches Us	
2011	Sanaa Hamri	Just Wright	
2011	Tyler Perry	For Colored Girls	
2012
2012	**Steve McQueen**	**Shame**	
2012	Salim Akil	Jumping the Broom	
2012	Qasim Basir	Mooz-lum	
2012	Ava DuVernay	I Will Follow	
2012	Dee Rees	Pariah	
2013
2013	**Ava DuVernay**	**Middle of Nowhere**	
2013	Salim Akil	Sparkle	
2013	Spike Lee	Red Hook Summer	
2013	Peter Ramsey	Rise of the Guardians	
2013	Tim Story	Think Like a Man	
2014
2014	**Steve McQueen**	**12 Years a Slave**	
2014	Ryan Coogler	Fruitvale Station	
2014	Lee Daniels	The Butler	
2014	Malcolm D. Lee	The Best Man Holiday	
2014	George Tillman Jr.	The Inevitable Defeat of Mister and Pete	
2015
2015	**Ava DuVernay**	**Selma**	
2015	Amma Asante	Belle	
2015	Gina Prince-Bythewood	Beyond the Lights	
2015	Chris Rock	Top Five	
2015	Justin Simien	Dear White People	
2016
2016	**Ryan Coogler**	**Creed**	
2016	Rick Famuyiwa	Dope	
2016	Antoine Fuqua	Southpaw	
2016	F. Gary Gray	Straight Outta Compton	
2016	Spike Lee	Chi-Raq	
2017
2017	**Barry Jenkins**	**Moonlight**	
2017	Don Cheadle	Miles Ahead	
2017	Antoine Fuqua	The Magnificent Seven	
2017	Nate Parker	The Birth of a Nation	
2017	Denzel Washington	Fences	
2018
2018	**Jordan Peele**	**Get Out**	
2018	Maggie Betts	Novitiate	
2018	Reginald Hudlin	Marshall	
2018	Malcolm D. Lee	Girls Trip	
2018	Dee Rees	Mudbound	
2019
2019	**Ryan Coogler**	**Black Panther**	
2019	Barry Jenkins	If Beale Street Could Talk	
2019	Steve McQueen	Widows	
2019	Spike Lee	BlacKkKlansman	
2019	Boots Riley	Sorry to Bother You	

=== 2020s ===
Year	Director	Film	Ref
2020
2020	**Jordan Peele**	**Us**	
2020	Mati Diop	Atlantics	
2020	Kasi Lemmons	Harriet	
2020	Melina Matsoukas	Queen & Slim	
2020	Julius Onah	Luce	
2021
2021	**Regina King**	**One Night in Miami...**	
2021	Radha Blank	The Forty-Year-Old Version	
2021	Shaka King	Judas and the Black Messiah	
2021	Spike Lee	Da 5 Bloods	
2021	Channing Godfrey Peoples	Miss Juneteenth	
2022
2022	**Jeymes Samuel**	**The Harder They Fall**	
2022	Halle Berry	Bruised	
2022	Nia DaCosta	Candyman	
2022	Reinaldo Marcus Green	King Richard	
2022	Rebecca Hall	Passing	
2023
2023	**Gina Prince-Bythewood**	**The Woman King**	
2023	Elegance Bratton	The Inspection	
2023	Chinonye Chukwu	Till	
2023	Ryan Coogler	Black Panther: Wakanda Forever	
2023	Jordan Peele	Nope	
2024
2024	**Cord Jefferson**	**American Fiction**	
2024	Blitz the Ambassador	The Color Purple	
2024	Ava DuVernay	Origin	
2024	Michael B. Jordan	Creed III	
2024	A. V. Rockwell	A Thousand and One	
2025
2025	**RaMell Ross**	**Nickel Boys**	
2025	Titus Kaphar	Exhibiting Forgiveness	
2025	Zoë Kravitz	Blink Twice	
2025	Steve McQueen	Blitz	
2025	Malcolm Washington	The Piano Lesson	
2026
2026	**Ryan Coogler**	**Sinners**	
2026	Nia DaCosta	Hedda	
2026	Spike Lee	Highest 2 Lowest	
2026	Rungano Nyoni	On Becoming a Guinea Fowl	
2026	R. T. Thorne	40 Acres	

== Multiple nominations and wins ==
=== Multiple wins ===
3 wins

- Ryan Coogler
- Gina Prince-Bythewood

2 wins

- Ava DuVernay
- Steve McQueen
- Jordan Peele

=== Multiple Nominees ===
12 nominations

- Spike Lee

6 nominations

- Antoine Fuqua
- Malcolm D. Lee

5 nominations

- Ryan Coogler

4 nominations

- Ava DuVernay
- Steve McQueen
- Gina Prince-Bythewood
- John Singleton

3 nominations

- Albert Hughes
- Allen Hughes
- Jordan Peele
- Tim Story

2 nominations

- Salim Akil
- Thomas Carter
- Nia DaCosta
- Lee Daniels
- Rick Famuyiwa
- F. Gary Gray
- Sanaa Hamri
- Gary Hardwick
- Barry Jenkins
- Dee Rees
- Charles Stone III
- George Tillman Jr.
- Denzel Washington

== Age superlatives ==
Record	Director	Film	Age (in years)
Oldest winner	Thomas Carter	Coach Carter	52
Oldest nominee	Spike Lee	Highest 2 Lowest	68
Youngest winner	Ryan Coogler	Creed	29
Youngest nominee	Rick Famuyiwa	The Wood	26

== Diversity of Nominees ==
=== Female nominees/winners ===
Twenty female directors have been nominated for a total twenty-eight times in this category, and three have won the award.

- 2001 - **Gina Prince-Bythewood** for **Love & Basketball**‡
- 2007 - Sanaa Hamri for Something New
- 2008 - **Gina Prince-Bythewood** for **The Secret Life of Bees**†
- 2008 - Darnell Martin for Cadillac Records‡
- 2011 - Tanya Hamilton for Night Catches Us‡
- 2011 - Sanaa Hamri for Just Wright†
- 2012 - Ava DuVernay for I Will Follow
- 2012 - Dee Rees for Pariah†
- 2013 - **Ava DuVernay** for **Middle of Nowhere**†
- 2015 - **Ava DuVernay** for **Selma**‡
- 2015 - Amma Asante for Belle†
- 2015 - Gina Prince-Bythewood for Beyond the Lights†
- 2018 - Maggie Betts for Novitiate
- 2018 - Dee Rees for Mudbound †
- 2020 - Mati Diop for Atlantics
- 2020 - Kasi Lemmons for Harriet
- 2020 - Melina Matsoukas for Queen & Slim †
- 2021 - **Regina King** for **One Night in Miami...** †
- 2021 - Radha Blank for The Forty-Year-Old Version
- 2021 - Channing Godfrey Peoples for Miss Juneteenth
- 2022 - Halle Berry for Bruised
- 2022 - Nia DaCosta for Candyman
- 2022 - Rebecca Hall for Passing †
- 2023 - **Gina Prince-Bythewood** for **The Woman King**
- 2023 - Chinonye Chukwu for Till
- 2024 - Ava DuVernay for Origin †
- 2024 - A. V. Rockwell for A Thousand and One
- 2025 - Zoë Kravitz for Blink Twice
- 2026 - Nia DaCosta for Hedda
- 2026 - Rungano Nyoni for On Becoming a Guinea Fowl

=== Documentary nominees/winners ===
Three directors of a documentary film have been nominated in this category.

- 2001 - Albert Hughes & Allen Hughes for American Pimp
- 2005 - Antoine Fuqua for Lightning in a Bottle

=== Animated nominees/winners ===
One director of an animated film has been nominated in this category.

- 2013 - Peter Ramsey for Rise of the Guardians

=== Non-English language nominees/winners ===
One director of a non-English film has been nominated in this category.

- 2020 - Mati Diop for Atlantics, Wolof & French

bold — Indicates winner
† — Film nominated for Outstanding Film
‡ — Film won for Outstanding Film
