= Black Reel Award for Outstanding Ensemble =

Motion picture award for acting

- Country: United States
- Presented by: The Black Reel Awards (BRAs)
- First award: Black Reel Awards of 2006
- Most recent winner: Victoria Thomas; The Harder They Fall (Black Reel Awards of 2022)
- Website: blackreelawards.com

This article lists the winners and nominees for the Black Reel Award for Outstanding Ensemble. First given in 2006, this award is given to the casting directors. Victoria Thomas holds the record for most wins in this category with 3.

== Winners and nominees ==
Winners are listed first and highlighted in bold.

=== 2000s ===
Year	Film	Casting Director	Ref
2006
2006	**Crash**	**Sarah Halley Finn and Randi Hiller**	
2006	Four Brothers	Kimberly Hardin	
2006	Hustle & Flow	Chris Gray and Kimberly Hardin	
2006	Rent	Tiffany Little Canfield and Bernard Telsey	
2006	Roll Bounce	Monica Swann	
2007	—N/a		
2008
2008	**Cadillac Records**	**Michelle Adams and Kimberly Hardin**	
2008	Honeydripper	John Hubbard	
2008	Miracle at St. Anna	Kim Coleman, Béatrice Kruger and Karen Kaia Livers	
2008	The Secret Life of Bees	Aisha Coley, Craig and Mark Fincannon	
2008	Slumdog Millionaire	Gail Stevens and Loveleen Tandan	

=== 2010s ===
Year	Film	Casting Director	Ref
2010
2010	**Precious**	**Billy Hopkins and Jessica Kelly**	
2010	American Violet	Susan Shopmaker	
2010	Notorious	Tracy Bird and Pamela Frazier	
2010	Passing Strange	Heidi Griffiths and Jordan Thaler	
2010	The Princess and the Frog	Jen Rudin	
2011
2011	**For Colored Girls**	**Robi Reed**	
2011	Brooklyn’s Finest	Suzanne Smith and Mary Vernieu	
2011	Night Catches Us	Lois J. Drabkin	
2011	Takers	Lisa Hayes Kroeger and David Rapaport	
2011	Unstoppable	Denise Chamian	
2012
2012	**The Help**	**Kerry Barden and Paul Schnee**	
2012	Attack the Block	Nina Gold	
2012	Fast Five	Debra Zane	
2012	Jumping the Broom	Tracy Byrd	
2012	Mooz-lum	Aleta Chappelle	
2012	Pariah	Eyde Belasco	
2013
2013	**Django Unchained**	**Victoria Thomas**	
2013	Flight	Victoria Burrows	
2013	Middle of Nowhere	Aisha Coley	
2013	Sparkle	Tracy Byrd	
2013	Think Like a Man	Kim Hardin	
2014
2014	**12 Years a Slave**	**Francine Maisler**	
2014	42	Victoria Thomas	
2014	The Best Man Holiday	Julie Hutchinson	
2014	The Butler	Leah Daniels and Billy Hopkins	
2014	Fruitvale Station	Nina Henninger	
2015
2015	**Selma**	**Aisha Coley**	
2015	Belle	Toby Whale	
2015	Dear White People	Kim Coleman	
2015	Get On Up	Kerry Barden and Paul Schnee	
2015	Top Five	Victoria Thomas	
2016
2016	**Straight Outta Compton**	**Victoria Thomas and Cindy Tolan**	
2016	Chi-Raq	Kim Coleman	
2016	Concussion	Lindsay Graham and Mary Vernieu	
2016	Creed	Francine Maisler	
2016	Dope	Kim Coleman	
2017
2017	**Moonlight**	**Yesi Ramirez**	
2017	The Birth of a Nation	Andrea Craven, Craig Fincannon, Lisa Mae Fincannon, Mary Vernieu, Michelle Wade Byrd	
2017	Fences	Victoria Thomas	
2017	Hidden Figures	Victoria Thomas	
2017	Keanu	Nicole Abellera and Jeanne McCarthy	
2018
2018	**Mudbound**	**Billy Hopkins (Casting Director), Ashley Ingram (Casting Director)**	
2018	Detroit	Victoria Thomas	
2018	Get Out	Terri Taylor	
2018	Girls Trip	Michelle Wade Byrd & Mary Vernieu	
2018	Marshall	Victoria Thomas	
2019
2019	**Black Panther**	**Sarah Halley Finn**	
2019	BlacKkKlansman	Kim Coleman	
2019	If Beale Street Could Talk	Cindy Tolan	
2019	Sorry to Bother You	Cindy Tolan	
2019	Widows	Francine Maisler, Mickie Paskal & Jennifer Rudnicke	

=== 2020s ===
Year	Film	Casting Director	Ref
2020
2020	**Dolemite Is My Name**	**Lindsay Graham**, **Mary Vernieu**	
2020	Just Mercy	Carmen Cuba	
2020	The Last Black Man in San Francisco	Julia Kim	
2020	Us	Terri Taylor	
2020	Waves	Avy Kaufman	
2021
2021	**One Night in Miami...**	**Kim Hardin**	
2021	Da 5 Bloods	Kim Coleman	
2021	Judas and the Black Messiah	Alexa L. Fogel	
2021	Ma Rainey's Black Bottom	Avy Kaufman	
2021	Miss Juneteenth	Chelsea Ellis Bloch	
2022
2022	**The Harder They Fall**	**Victoria Thomas**	
2022	In the Heights	Tiffany Little Canfield & Bernard Telsey	
2022	King Richard	Rich Delia & Avy Kaufman	
2022	Passing	Kim Ostroy & Laura Rosenthal	
2022	Zola	Kim Coleman	

== Multiple nominations and wins ==
=== Multiple wins ===
3 Wins

- Victoria Thomas

2 Wins

- Sarah Halley Finn
- Kim Hardin
- Billy Hopkins
- Victoria Thomas

=== Multiple nominations ===
9 Nominations

- Victoria Thomas

7 Nominations

- Kim Coleman

5 Nominations

- Mary Vernieu
- Kim Hardin

3 Nominations

- Twinkie Byrd
- Francine Maisler
- Cindy Tolan
- Billy Hopkins
- Aisha Coley
- Avy Kaufman

2 Nominations

- Tiffany Little Canfield
- Terri Taylor
- Sarah Halley Finn
- Paul Schnee
- Michelle Wade Byrd
- Lisa Mae Fincannon
- Lindsay Graham
- Kerry Barden
- Craig Fincannon
- Bernard Telsey
