= Relaxer (film) =

2018 American drama film

- Directed by: Joel Potrykus
- Written by: Joel Potrykus
- Produced by: Ashley Young
- Starring: Joshua Burge; David Dastmalchian; Andre Hyland; Amari Cheatom; Adina Howard
- Cinematography: Adam J. Minnick
- Edited by: Joel Potrykus
- Music by: Alan Palomo
- Production companies: Sob Noisse Movies; Oscilloscope Laboratories
- Distributed by: Oscilloscope Laboratories
- Release date: March 9, 2018 (SXSW)
- Running time: 91 minutes
- Country: United States
- Language: English

Relaxer is a 2018 American comedy film written and directed by Joel Potrykus. It stars Joshua Burge, David Dastmalchian, Andre Hyland, Amari Cheatom, and Adina Howard. Set in 1999, it tells the story of a man playing Pac-Man in a living room. The film premiered at the South by Southwest on March 9, 2018, and Burge won the Best Actor award at the 2018 Fantasia International Film Festival. The film was released in the United States on March 22, 2019.

== Plot ==
In 1999, Cam (David Dastmalchian) gives his younger brother Abbie (Joshua Burge) an ultimate challenge. Abbie is not allowed to leave the couch until he goes beyond level 256 of Pac-Man. Along his journey to beat the game before Y2K hits, many people come in. After he finally beats the level, his 3D sunglasses glow and a bright version of the level flashes behind him on the wall [later said in the movie by Abbie that it reminded him of a family memory about their father saying a bright light shining through a car window was a smaller version of a nuclear bomb] and Y2K finally hits but, he's stuck on the couch due to being frozen on and being on it for months. Possible years pass as Abbie just sleeps. He's woken up by Cam's friend, and, after Cam screams at him, Abbie slowly rips himself from the couch and uses telekinesis to blow up his head before grabbing a knife while giggling and saying "Take it."

== Cast ==
- Joshua Burge as Abbie
- David Dastmalchian as Cam
- Andre Hyland as Dallas
- Amari Cheatom as Cortez
- Adina Howard as Arin

== Production ==
The film was shot in the garage of a house owned by production designer Mike Saunders' parents. It took four months to build the set. The film's premise was inspired by Luis Buñuel's The Exterminating Angel.

== Release ==
The film had its premiere at the South by Southwest on March 9, 2018. It also screened at the Fantasia International Film Festival, the Traverse City Film Festival, and the Vancouver International Film Festival. It was released in the United States on March 22, 2019.

== Reception ==
As of October 2021, the film holds a 68% approval rating on Rotten Tomatoes, based on 34 reviews with an average rating of 6.8/10. The website's critical consensus reads, "Relaxer is bound to strike many viewers as unpleasant, but this thoroughly unique comedy will strike a chord with fans of defiantly unsettling cinema." At Metacritic, the film has a weighted average score of 82 out of 100, based on 7 critics, indicating "universal acclaim".

Eric Kohn of IndieWire gave the film a grade of A, describing it as "a grotesque downward spiral, both hilarious and mesmerizing, but above all elevated by its insights into the depraved final gasp of the analog age." Calum Marsh of The Village Voice stated that the film is "funnier, nastier, and more abrasive" than Joel Potrykus' 2014 film Buzzard. Nick Allen of RogerEbert.com said, "through its precise filmmaking and whirlwind script about one loser who never gets off the couch, it's a magnetic, five-senses experience for slacker cinema." John DeFore of The Hollywood Reporter said, "the claustrophobic, one-set film clearly invites metaphorical readings — but its allegories will play best to viewers who can stomach the idea of spending eternity on a couch playing Nintendo." Carson Lund of Slant Magazine gave the film 3.5 stars out of 4, calling it "a showcase for [Joshua] Burge and his exceptional features, from his beady eyes to slender frame."
