= Vulcanizadora =

Film by Joel Potrykus

- Theatrical release poster
- Directed by: Joel Potrykus
- Written by: Joel Potrykus
- Produced by: Hannah Dweck; Matt Grady; Ashley Potrykus; Theodore Schaefer
- Starring: Joel Potrykus; Joshua Burge; Bill Vincent; Solo Potrykus
- Cinematography: Adam J. Minnick
- Edited by: Joel Potrykus
- Music by: Sasa Slogar
- Production companies: Factory 25; Dweck Productions; Sob Noisse
- Distributed by: Oscilloscope Laboratories
- Release dates: June 8, 2024 (Tribeca); May 2, 2025 (United States)
- Running time: 85 minutes
- Country: United States
- Language: English
- Box office: $25,369

Vulcanizadora (Note: Spanish for Vulcanizer.) is a 2024 American independent black comedy thriller film edited, written, directed, and starring Joel Potrykus. Calling it his "most personal and bleakest work", the film follows two friends, played by Potrykus and Joshua Burge, who travel into the Michigan woods for a dark mission that goes awry. Bill Vincent and Solo Potrykus also star.

Vulcanizadora premiered at the 2024 Tribeca Film Festival. Vulcanizadora was released in the United States on May 2, 2025, by Oscilloscope Laboratories. The film received acclaim from critics.

== Synopsis ==
Derek and Marty walk through the Michigan woods; Derek frets that he left his housekeys on the bus, and Marty asks why he even cares. The pair engage in childlike activities, largely spurred on by Derek, such as smashing sticks against trees, playing with fireworks and digging up buried porno magazines.

The next day, Marty interrogates Derek about a series of pink ribbons he has been tying to branches, asking him if they're to help him get home. Derek says they're there to help Marty get home if he wimps out. Marty destroys Derek's tent.

Later, Marty reveals that he has three very powerful fireworks, and uses one to blow up Derek's metal "Jaeger Grail" flask, saying that the other two will be saved for the end of their trip. It becomes apparent that Marty is facing prison time over an act of arson, and that they plan to kill each other simultaneously. Derek confronts Marty about the destruction of his flask and tent, and the two get into a fight, which Derek loses. Derek cries by himself afterwards.

The pair arrive at a beach, and Derek goes for "one last swim" before they sit down for a final meal of snacks. Derek shows some reticence about the plan, and worries that they could go to Hell. He begins to open up about how his ex-wife has taken his son Jeremy away and won't allow him access.

Derek cries again, and says that maybe he just needed to get that off his chest, and that he doesn't want to die any more. Marty tells him he'll only be sad again the next day, and produces two masks that will hold Marty's powerful fireworks in their mouths. He pressures Derek into putting on the mask, and puts on his own; then the pair agree to light each other's fuses on the count of three while filming it on Derek's camera.

Marty lights Derek's fuse, but Derek, panicking, doesn't light Marty's. Derek runs away and tries to remove his mask, but fails and the firework kills him. Marty, horrified, removes a note Derek wrote for Jeremy from his pocket, then buries the body in the sand and uses the pink ribbons to get home.

Marty, wracked with guilt, begins stalking Jeremy. He hopes to be given a prison sentence for his arson, but his lawyer has found a loophole and he is set free. He attempts to use the recording of Derek's death to admit guilt to people, but his father is uninterested in watching it and the police, recognising him from the arson, refuse to deal with him. He leaves the tape at the police station.

The next day, Marty gives Derek's note and a wad of cash to Jeremy. Derek's ex-wife finds them and demands he call Derek, who is behind on alimony payments. Marty flees and goes to the beach, where he intends to dig up Derek's body. However, he cannot find it.

He falls asleep at the beach, and wakes the next morning to see families playing there. A boy digs up Derek's body, and as the adults intervene, Marty smiles and walks into the sea. Meanwhile, Jeremy reads Derek's note, which promises his son that "I did not do anything—this—because of anything that you did."

== Cast ==
- Joel Potrykus as Derek Skiba
- Joshua Burge as Marty Jackitansky
- Bill Vincent as Gar
- Solo Potrykus as Jeremy Skiba
- Melissa Blanchard as Lynn
- Sherryl Despres as Lawyer
- Scott Ayotte as Officer
- Dennis Grantz as Judge

== Release ==
Vulcanizadora premiered at the Tribeca Film Festival on June 8, 2024, where it played until June 13. Joshua Burge received the award for Special Jury Mention for Performance in a U.S. Feature. Additionally, the film appeared at the Oak Cliff Film Festival from June 20–23 the same year, taking home the Best Narrative Feature Film Award. It also played at the 28th Fantasia International Film Festival on July 19, 2024, and the 26th Annual Sidewalk Film Festival on August 24, 2024, as well as the Chicago International Film Festival on October 16 and 19, 2024.

In February 2025, Oscilloscope Laboratories acquired North American distribution rights to the film. The film was released in the United States on May 2, 2025.

=== Critical reception ===
On the review aggregator website Rotten Tomatoes, 98% of 50 critics' reviews are positive. Metacritic, which uses a weighted average, assigned the film a score of 82 out of 100, based on ten critics, indicating "universal acclaim".
