= Ape (2012 film) =

2012 American black comedy film

- Directed by: Joel Potrykus
- Written by: Joel Potrykus
- Produced by: Joel Potrykus; Ashley Young; Michael Saunders; Kevin Clancy
- Starring: Joshua Burge
- Distributed by: Factory 25
- Release date: 2012
- Running time: 86 min
- Country: United States
- Language: English

Ape is a 2012 American independent black comedy film written and directed by Joel Potrykus, starring Joshua Burge as Trevor Newandyke. The film was a precursor to Potrykus's later film, Buzzard, which also starred Burge.

== Premise ==
A black comedy and rage fantasy, the film follows failing stand-up comic Trevor as he suffers one humiliation after another, both on stage and off. His only outlet is a secret pyromania on display at home and in public. His anger hits the streets after making a deal with a man dressed as the Devil.

== Cast ==
- Joshua Burge as Trevor Newandyke
- Gary Bosek as Dennis Spicer
- Daniel Falicki as The Devil

== Release ==
Ape made its world premiere at the 2012 Locarno Film Festival, where it won Best New Director and Best First Feature Special Mention at the festival. It went on to make its North American premiere at the Vancouver International Film Festival, and US premiere at AFI Fest in Hollywood. The film received a theatrical release through Factory 25.

== Reception ==
Ape has received generally favorable reviews from critics. Rotten Tomatoes gave the film a rating of 100%, based on 5 reviews.
