= Joel Potrykus =

American film director and screenwriter

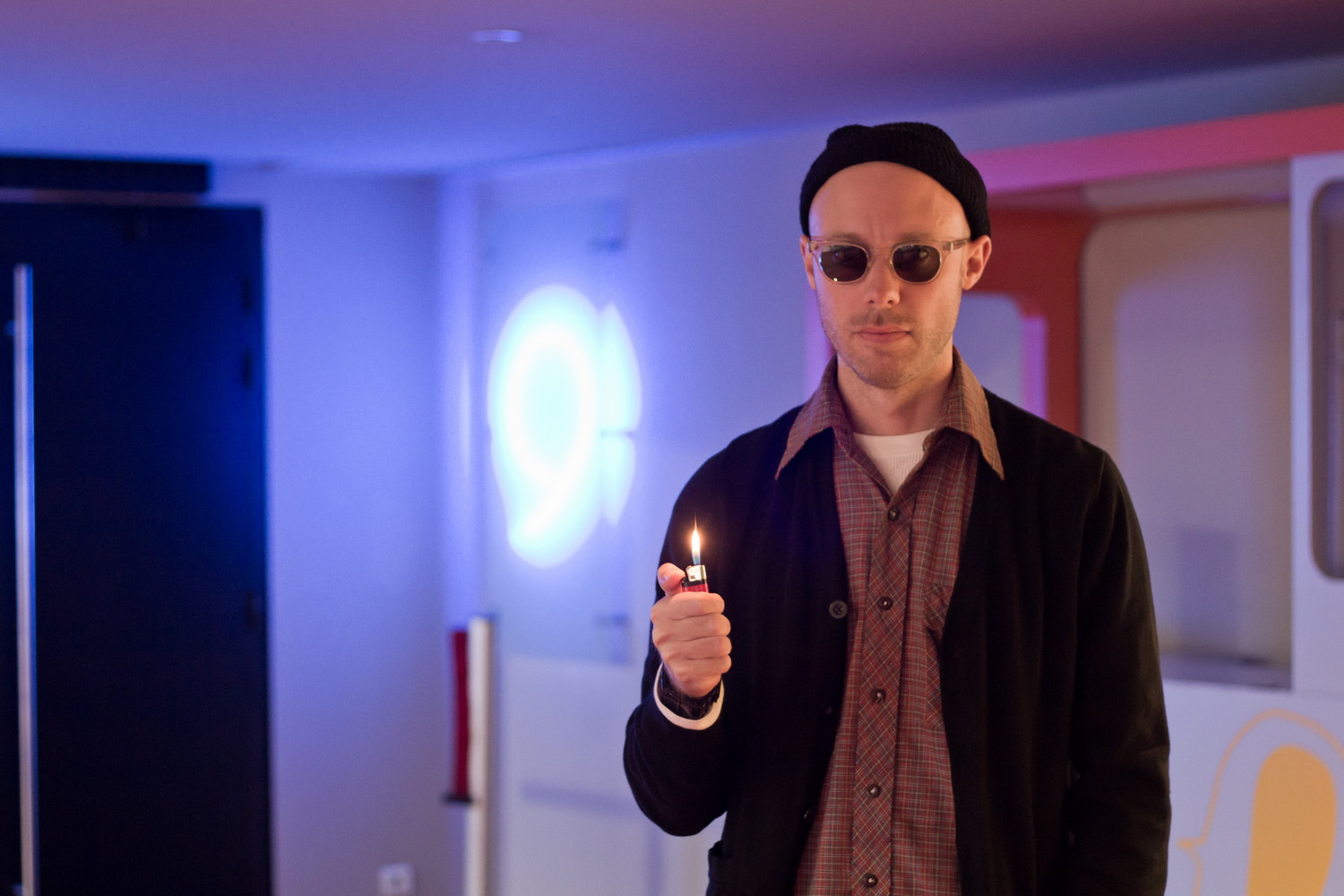
- Joel Potrykus at the 2012 Belfort Entrevues Film Festival
- Born: July 10, 1977 (age 49); Ossineke, Michigan, U.S.
- Occupations: Film director, screenwriter
- Website: joelpotrykus.com

Joel Potrykus (born July 10, 1977) is an American film director and screenwriter. His feature film debut Ape won the Best New Director prize at the 2012 Locarno Film Festival, while his follow-up feature Buzzard won the FIPRESCI Prize at the 2014 Ljubljana International Film Festival.

== Early life ==
Potrykus was born and raised in Ossineke, Michigan, then moved to Grand Rapids, Michigan to study film at Grand Valley State University. Later, he earned his MFA in screenwriting from Emerson College.

== Career ==
A stint as a stand-up comedian in New York City led to the inspiration for his first feature film, Ape. While spending a year as a temp at a Michigan mortgage company led to the inspiration of his second feature film, Buzzard. The book Walden by Henry David Thoreau was the influence for Potrykus' 2016 feature The Alchemist Cookbook, which builds on his themes of slackers and loneliness. His fourth feature film Relaxer, is a modern interpretation of Luis Buñuel's The Exterminating Angel. He's been the subject of retrospectives at the Brooklyn Academy of Music in 2015 and at the 2016 Valdivia Film Festival.

In 2024, his fifth feature film, Vulcanizadora, premiered at the Tribeca Film Festival, taking home a Special Jury Prize for actor Joshua Burge. Chase Hutchinson of Collider said of the film, "There is no film you’ll ever see like it as it patiently builds to a terrifying explosion and then keeps going from where most would stop, leaving us to pick up the pieces that are forever shattered." The film had its International premiere at the 28th Fantasia International Film Festival on July 19, 2024.

He is currently an Associate Professor of filmmaking at Grand Valley State University.

== Style and influences ==
In 2016, Vimooz called Potrykus "The New King of Underground Cinema". Vague Visages credits him as the originator of the new genre, "metal slackerism". While Filmofilia called him, "indie cinema's patron saint of misfits".

Potrykus has cited the following directors and films as having an influence on his work: Alan Clarke's Made in Britain, Lindsay Anderson's O Lucky Man!, Martin Scorsese's Taxi Driver, Vincent Gallo's Buffalo ’66, Rick Alverson's The Comedy, Luis Buñuel's The Discreet Charm of the Bourgeoisie, Jim Jarmusch's Down by Law, Sam Raimi's Evil Dead, F. W. Murnau's Faust and James Nguyen's Birdemic; as well as the films of Michael Haneke, Kelly Reichardt, Jean-Luc Godard and Quentin Tarantino.

== Filmography ==
=== Feature films ===
- Ape (2012)
- Buzzard (2014)
- The Alchemist Cookbook (2016)
- Relaxer (2018)
- Vulcanizadora (2024)

=== Short films ===
- Birthday Boy (1999)
- Peter Knows Kelly's the Cool One (1999)
- The Ludovico Treatment (1999)
- Mice & Milk (2001)
- Gordon (2007)
- Coyote (2010)
- Thing from the Factory by the Field (2022)
- Unemployees (2023)
- Pear (2024)
- Pets (2025)
- Three Divided by Zero (2026)
