= Love Under New Management: The Miki Howard Story =

Biographical film by Christine Swanson

- Written by: Rhonda Baraka; Christine Swanson
- Directed by: Christine Swanson
- Starring: Teyonah Parris; Gary Dourdan; Darius McCrary; Amari Cheatom; LisaRaye McCoy; Vanessa Bell Calloway
- Music by: Kurt Farquhar
- Country of origin: United States
- Original language: English

Production
- Producers: Teyonah Parris; Carl Craig; Ron Robinson; Eric Tomosunas
- Cinematography: Tommy Maddox-Upshaw
- Editor: Grisha Alasadi
- Running time: 120 minutes
- Production company: Swirl Films
- Budget: $2,000,000

Original release
- Network: TV One
- Release: June 12, 2016

Love Under New Management: The Miki Howard Story is a 2016 American biographical musical drama film directed by Christine Swanson and written by Swanson and Rhonda Baraka. The film stars Teyonah Parris as R&B and Jazz singer Miki Howard. The film follows Howard's time as a homeless teenager to her abusive relationship with Eddie Phelps and drug addiction to becoming a Grammy Award-nominated singer. The film also starring Gary Dourdan, Darius McCrary, Amari Cheatom, LisaRaye McCoy and Vanessa Bell Calloway as her mother, gospel singer Josephine Howard. Howard also appears in a special cameo. The title refer to her song "Love Under New Management". It premiered on TV One on June 12, 2016.

== Cast ==
- Teyonah Parris as Miki Howard
- Gary Dourdan as Augie Johnson
- Darius McCrary as Gerald Levert
- Amari Cheatom as Eddie Phelps
- LisaRaye McCoy as Sylvia Rhone
- Vanessa Bell Calloway as Josephine Howard
- Milini Khan as Chaka Khan
- Kirk Bovill as Carl

== Reception ==
The film became the highest-rated original movie in the history of the TV One network. Parris received positive reviews for her performance as Howard. The film received three nominations at the 2017 Black Reel Awards: for Best Television Miniseries or Movie, Outstanding Actress, TV Movie or Limited Series (Parris), and Outstanding Screenplay in a TV Movie or Limited Series.
