= Pratfall (film) =

2023 American independent film

- Directed by: Alex Andre
- Written by: Alex Andre
- Produced by: Alex Andre, Jordyn Barber
- Starring: Joshua Burge, Chloé Groussard
- Cinematography: Alex Andre
- Edited by: Alex Andre
- Production company: Feverland Pictures
- Distributed by: Freestyle Digital Media
- Release dates: 3 June 2023 (Brooklyn Film Festival); 26 April 2024
- Country: United States
- Language: English

Pratfall is a 2023 American independent drama film written and directed by Alex Andre. It stars Joshua Burge and Chloé Groussard and follows a troubled insomniac in New York City whose routine is disrupted after he meets a French tourist. The film marked Andre's feature directorial debut. It had its world premiere at the Brooklyn Film Festival in 2023, where it won the Spirit Award for Best Narrative Feature, and Groussard won Best Actress at the Manchester Film Festival. The film was released theatrically in select theaters and on video-on-demand platforms in April 2024.

== Plot ==
Eli, a troubled insomniac living in New York City, encounters Joelle, an enigmatic French tourist, in Central Park. The two set off on a sleepless adventure through New York City.

== Cast ==
- Joshua Burge as Eli
- Chloé Groussard as Joelle

== Production ==
Pratfall was produced as an independently financed feature film, with Alex Andre serving in multiple creative roles, including writer, director, cinematographer, editor, and producer. The film was shot on location in New York City. Both The Film Stage and Film Threat identified Pratfall as Andre's feature-length directorial debut.

In interviews with Film Threat and Vague Visages, Andre and actor Joshua Burge described a structured process in which the film was developed from a written treatment, with scenes guided by predefined narrative beats. Dialogue was refined through rehearsal, with limited improvisation incorporated during filming. Burge added that shooting on location in New York allowed the production to incorporate ambient, unscripted elements from the surrounding environment into the finished film.

== Release ==
Pratfall had its world premiere at the Brooklyn Film Festival in 2023, where it received the Spirit Award for Best Narrative Feature. The film later screened at several international festivals, including the Manchester Film Festival and the Pendance Film Festival.

In April 2024, Freestyle Digital Media acquired North American video-on-demand rights to the film. Pratfall was released theatrically in select theaters, including a run at Laemmle Royal in Los Angeles, and made available on digital platforms on April 26, 2024. Upon its Video on demand release, the film was featured in The Film Stage’s weekly “New to Streaming” column.

The film was also listed by Entertainment Weekly as being released in select theaters and on video-on-demand during its April 2024 release window.

The film additionally screened internationally, including a Paris premiere at the Christine Cinema Club. In 2025, the film expanded to additional international territories and was listed as available on streaming platforms in multiple regions.

== Reception ==
Pratfall received generally positive reviews. On Rotten Tomatoes, the film holds an approval rating of 90% based on 10 reviews.

Writing for Film International, critic Thomas M. Puhr described the film as an exploration of “the very human desire to be seen” and the vulnerability that accompanies it, noting its emphasis on character interaction and emotional immediacy. A review in Film Threat praised Joshua Burge's performance, describing his portrayal of the protagonist as that of a “mentally overloaded New Yorker.”

A review published by High on Films similarly highlighted Burge's performance as the film's emotional anchor and noted director Alex Andre's intimate handheld style, as well as the narrative's shift from a conversational character study to a darker examination of urban isolation.

== Accolades ==
- Brooklyn Film Festival (2023) – Spirit Award for Best Narrative Feature
- Manchester Film Festival (2024) – Best Actress
