= 5th Annual Black Reel Awards =

Film-industry awards in 2004

5th Black Reel Awards
- Date: February 22, 2004
- Location: Washington, D.C.

The 2004 Black Reel Awards, which annually recognize and celebrate the achievements of black people in feature, independent and television films, took place in Washington, D.C., on February 22, 2004. Deacons for Defense won the most awards, taking home four awards, with Out of Time and The Fighting Temptations taking home two awards.

== Winners and nominees ==
Winners are listed first and highlighted in bold.

Best Film	Best Director
**Out of Time**; The Fighting Temptations; The Italian Job; S.W.A.T.; Tupac: Resurrection	**F. Gary Gray – The Italian Job**; Carl Franklin – Out of Time; Antoine Fuqua – Tears of the Sun; Gary Hardwick – Deliver Us from Eva; John Singleton – 2 Fast 2 Furious
Best Actor	Best Actress
**Chiwetel Ejiofor – Dirty Pretty Things**; Cuba Gooding Jr. – Radio; LL Cool J – Deliver Us from Eva; Wentworth Miller – The Human Stain; Denzel Washington – Out of Time	**Sanaa Lathan – Out of Time**; Halle Berry – Gothika; Beyoncé – The Fighting Temptations; Queen Latifah – Bringing Down the House; Gabrielle Union – Deliver Us from Eva
Best Supporting Actor	Best Supporting Actress
**Djimon Hounsou – In America**; Mos Def – The Italian Job; Morgan Freeman – Bruce Almighty; Ving Rhames – Dark Blue; Forest Whitaker – Phone Booth	**Anna Deavere Smith – The Human Stain**; Mary Alice – The Matrix Revolutions; Gloria Foster – The Matrix Reloaded; Vivica A. Fox – Kill Bill: Volume 1; Michael Michele – Dark Blue
Best Screenplay, Adapted or Original	Best Breakthrough Performance
**B.E. Brauner, Gary Hardwick and James Iver Mattson – Deliver Us from Eva**; Elizabeth Hunter and Saladin K. Patterson – The Fighting Temptations; Ali LeRoi and Chris Rock – Head of State	**Naomie Harris – 28 Days Later**; Lil' Romeo – Honey; Wentworth Miller – The Human Stain
Outstanding Original Soundtrack	Best Original or Adapted Song
**The Fighting Temptations**; 2 Fast 2 Furious; Bad Boys II; Deliver Us from Eva; Tupac: Resurrection	**"He Still Loves Me" from The Fighting Temptations – Performed by Beyoncé and Walter Williams Sr.**; "Act a Fool" from 2 Fast 2 Furious – Performed by Ludacris; "Paradise" from Deliver Us from Eva – Performed by LL Cool J and Amerie; "Pump It Up" from 2 Fast 2 Furious – Performed by Joe Budden; "Runnin' (Dying to Live)" from Tupac: Resurrection – Performed by Tupac Shakur and Notorious B.I.G.
Best Television Miniseries or Movie	Outstanding Director in a Television Miniseries or Movie
**Deacons for Defense (Showtime) – Robert Rehme**; The Cheetah Girls (Disney Channel) – Jacqueline George; D.C. Sniper: 23 Days of Fear (USA Network) – Orly Adelson and Jonathan Eskenas; Good Fences (Showtime) – Danny Glover and Whoopi Goldberg; Sounder (ABC) – Howard Braunstein and Bill Cain	**Bill Duke – Deacons for Defense (Showtime)**; Ernest R. Dickerson – Good Fences (Showtime); Kevin Hooks – Sounder (ABC)
Best Actor in a TV Movie or Limited Series	Best Actress in a TV Movie or Limited Series
**Forest Whitaker – Deacons for Defense (Showtime)**; Danny Glover – Good Fences (Showtime); Carl Lumbly – Sounder (ABC)	**Suzzanne Douglas – Sounder (ABC)**; Whoopi Goldberg – Good Fences (Showtime); Raven-Symoné – The Cheetah Girls (Disney Channel)
Best Supporting Actor in a TV Movie or Limited Series	Best Supporting Actress in a TV Movie or Limited Series
**Jeffrey Wright – Angels in America (HBO)**; Ossie Davis – Deacons for Defense (Showtime); Paul Winfield – Sounder (ABC)	**Mo'Nique – Good Fences (Showtime)**; Robin Givens – Hollywood Wives: The New Generation (CBS); Lynn Whitfield – The Cheetah Girls (Disney Channel)
Outstanding Screenplay in a TV Movie or Limited Series
**Frank Military and Richard Wesley – Deacons for Defense (Showtime)**; Bill Cain – Sounder (ABC); Trey Ellis – Good Fences (Showtime)
Best Independent Film	Best Original Television Program
**Anne B. Real – Lisa France**; All About You – Christine Swanson; G – Shonie De La Rosa and Larry Blackhorse Lowe	**Unchained Memories**; The American Experience: The Murder of Emmett Till (15.6); Brother Outsider: The Life of Bayard Rustin; Hollywood Celebrates Denzel Washington: An American Cinematheque Tribute
