= Joshua Burge =

American actor and musician

- Born: Grand Rapids, Michigan, United States
- Other name: Chance Jones
- Years active: 2005-present
- Musical career
- Genres: Punk; rock; anti-folk; glam rock; motown
- Instruments: Vocals, guitar

Joshua Burge is an American actor and musician known for his work in independent cinema.

== Early life ==
Born on April 22, 1980 in Pennsylvania, Burge was raised in Grand Rapids, Michigan, with a younger sister, Rebekah. Grand Rapids is also where he began performing as a lead vocalist and guitarist under the name Chance Jones.

== Film career ==
Burge's film career began after he was cast by film director Joel Potrykus, also a resident of Grand Rapids. Burge's early collaborations with Potrykus include Ape (2012), Buzzard (2014), and Relaxer (2018). In The Revenant (2015), he played Stubby Bill, marking his Hollywood debut. More recently, Burge starred in Pratfall (2024). In 2024, he again collaborated with Potrykus, for Vulcanizadora (2024), which premiered at the Tribeca Film Festival, where Burge was awarded a Special Jury Prize.

== Acting credits ==
=== Film ===
Year	Title	Role	Notes
2024	Erection and Destruction	Lead; Chip	Dir. Eddie Mullins; Short
2024	Vulcanizadora	Lead; Marty Jackitansky	Dir. Joel Potrykus
2023	The Commute	Lead; Crafty Pat	Dir. Randy Mack; Short
2023	Don't Die	Randy	Dir. Benjamin Stark
2023	Pratfall	Lead; Eli	Dir. Alex Andre
2022	Cosmic Dawn	Tom	Dir. Jefferson Moneo
2018	Relaxer	Lead; Abbie	Dir. Joel Potrykus
2018	Burden	Ronny	Dir. Andrew Heckler
2016	20th Century Women	Abbie's Friend	Dir. Mike Mills
2015	The Revenant	Stubby Bill	Dir. Alejandro González Iñárritu
2014	Buzzard	Lead; Marty Jackitansky	Dir. Joel Potrykus
2013	Remotion: Prologue	Lead; Mark	Dir. Ryan Lieske; Short
2013	Shift's End	Lead; Marty	Dir. Courtland J. Tell; Short
2012	Ape	Lead; Trevor Newandyke	Dir. Joel Potrykus
2010	Coyote	Lead; Coyote	Dir. Joel Potrykus; Short

=== Television ===
Year	Title	Role	Notes
2020	Into the Dark	Garrett; The Emperor	Hulu / Dir. Julius Ramsay

=== Theater ===
Year	Title	Role	Venue	Refs.
2013	Want Want Lovely Play	Various Roles	Cangue League	
2013	The Death of Schopenhauer	Various Roles	Cangue League	
2012	Skwert of Blud	Various Roles	Cangue League	
2011	Revolutions	Lead	Cangue League	

== Discography ==
=== As Chance Jones ===
- The Letter S (2005)
- 11th Hour Coward (2006)
- The Angels' Share (2008)
- The Incident at Primrose and West (2009)
- Live at Frederik Meijer Gardens (2010)
- Normandie (2023)
