= 10th Annual Black Reel Awards =

Film-industry awards in 2010

10th Black Reel Awards
- Date: February 12, 2010
- Location: Washington, D.C.

The 2010 Black Reel Awards, which annually recognize and celebrate the achievements of black people in feature, independent and television films, took place in Washington, D.C., on February 12, 2010. Precious took home a record-breaking 7 wins, with The Princess and the Frog taking home two awards.

== Winners and nominees ==
Winners are listed first and highlighted in bold.

Best Film	Best Director
**Precious**; American Violet; The Blind Side; Invictus; The Princess and the Frog	**Lee Daniels – Precious**; Bill Duke – Not Easily Broken; Spike Lee – Passing Strange; Scott Sanders – Black Dynamite; George Tillman Jr. – Notorious
Best Actor	Best Actress
**Morgan Freeman – Invictus**; Quinton Aaron – The Blind Side; Jamie Foxx – The Soloist; Souléymane Sy Savané – Goodbye Solo; Denzel Washington – The Taking of Pelham 123	**Gabourey Sidibe – Precious**; Nicole Beharie – American Violet; Taraji P. Henson – I Can Do Bad All By Myself; Sophie Okonedo – Skin; Maya Rudolph – Away We Go
Best Supporting Actor	Best Supporting Actress
**Anthony Mackie – The Hurt Locker**; Charles S. Dutton – American Violet; Chiwetel Ejiofor – 2012; Lenny Kravitz – Precious; Derek Luke – Madea Goes to Jail	**Mo'Nique – Precious**; Mariah Carey – Precious; Paula Patton – Precious; Zoe Saldaña – Avatar; Alfre Woodard – American Violet
Best Screenplay, Adapted or Original	Best Voice Performance
**Geoffrey S. Fletcher – Precious**; Brian Bird – Not Easily Broken; Cheo Hodari Coker and Reggie Rock Bythewood – Notorious; John Lee Hooker – The Blind Side; Bryon Minms, Scott Sanders and Michael Jai White – Black Dynamite	**Anika Noni Rose – The Princess and the Frog**; Keith David – Coraline; Keith David – The Princess and the Frog; Delroy Lindo – Up; Forest Whitaker – Where the Wild Things Are
Best Breakthrough Performance	Best Ensemble
**Gabourey Sidibe – Precious**; Quinton Aaron – The Blind Side; Nicole Beharie – American Violet; Souléymane Sy Savané – Goodbye Solo; Jamal Woolard – Notorious	**Billy Hopkins and Jessica Kelly – Precious**; Tracy Bird and Pamela Frazier – Notorious; Heidi Griffiths and Jordan Thaler – Passing Strange; Jen Rudin – The Princess and the Frog; Susan Shopmaker – American Violet
Best Original or Adapted Song
**"Almost There" from The Princess and the Frog – Anika Noni Rose**; "Down in New Orleans" from The Princess and the Frog – Anika Noni Rose; "I Can Do Bad All By Myself" from I Can Do Bad All By Myself – Mary J. Blige; "Keys" from Passing Strange – Daniel Breaker and De'Adre Aziza; "Never Knew I Needed" from The Princess and the Frog – Ne-Yo
Best Independent Feature	Best Feature Documentary
**Mississippi Damned – Tina Mabry**; Sugar – Anna Boden and Ryan Fleck; This is the Life – Ava DuVernay	**Good Hair – Jeff Stilson**; Michael Jackson's This Is It – Kenny Ortega; More than a Game – Kristopher Belman; Passing Strange – Spike Lee; Tyson – James Toback
Outstanding Independent Documentary	Outstanding Independent Short Film
**Without Bias – Kirk Fraser**; Herskovits at the Heart of Blackness – Llewellyn M. Smith; Still Bill – Damani Baker and Alex Vlack	**(Mis)leading Man – Morocco Omari**; Life on Earth – Jeffrey Keith; The Roe Effect – Kiel Adrian Scott
