= Middle of Nowhere (2012 film) =

2012 film by Ava DuVernay

- Theatrical release poster
- Directed by: Ava DuVernay
- Written by: Ava DuVernay
- Produced by: Ava DuVernay; Howard Barish
- Starring: Emayatzy Corinealdi; Omari Hardwick; Edwina Findley; Sharon Lawrence; Lorraine Toussaint; David Oyelowo
- Cinematography: Bradford Young
- Edited by: Spencer Averick
- Music by: Kathryn Bostic
- Production company: Forward Movement Kandoo Films
- Distributed by: AFFRM; Participant Media
- Release dates: January 20, 2012 (Sundance); October 12, 2012 (United States)
- Country: United States
- Language: English
- Budget: $200,000
- Box office: $236,806

Middle of Nowhere is a 2012 American independent drama film written and directed by Ava DuVernay and starring Emayatzy Corinealdi, David Oyelowo, Omari Hardwick and Lorraine Toussaint. The film was the winner of the Directing Award for U.S. Dramatic Film at the 2012 Sundance Film Festival.

== Plot ==
Ruby is a registered nurse in Compton, California, who had been working to become a doctor and now dedicates most of her time to visiting her husband Derek in prison and helping him to get paroled early. Flashbacks during the film depict Derek's arrest and, along with encounters with one of Derek's friends, Rashad, suggest that Ruby has not been aware of everything that Derek had been doing. As pressures for Derek's case build, Ruby's life becomes increasingly constricted. She ultimately distances herself from her sister Rosie, whose son she has often cared for, and from her mother Ruth, who is poisonously bitter that her daughters have not lived up to her expectations.

Ruby's one growing attachment is with Brian, a bus driver, who is clearly attracted to her. While Ruby feels guilty as they begin to date, she eventually learns that Derek has lied to her more than once and begins to come to terms with how to forge ahead with her own life while remaining true to her convictions.

== Cast ==
- Emayatzy Corinealdi as Ruby
- David Oyelowo as Brian
- Omari Hardwick as Derek
- Lorraine Toussaint as Ruth
- Edwina Findley as Rosie
- Sharon Lawrence as Fraine

== Production ==
=== Development ===
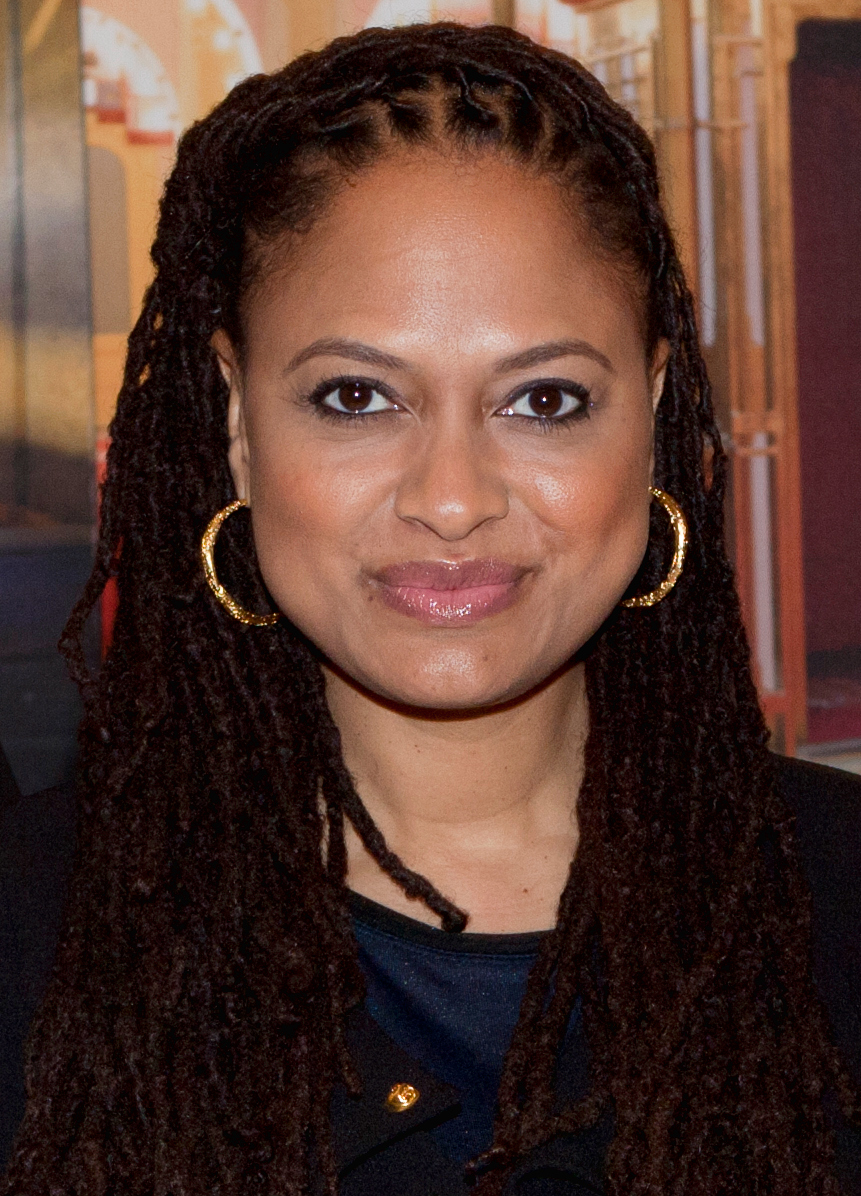
Ava DuVernay wrote, directed, and produced Middle of Nowhere.

DuVernay explained that when she began to examine what life is like in Compton and "the texture of the lives of women who live there", the subject of incarceration kept coming up. The director spent months conducting research for the film, including interviewing the wives of felons, before writing a screenplay. DuVernay revealed that she was exploring the same theme of "lost love and how it affects you when it's gone" in Middle of Nowhere as she did in her first feature, I Will Follow (2010). The director considered herself fortunate to be able to explore personal themes of interest in her second film.

Describing her viewpoint, DuVernay told Allison Samuels of The Daily Beast,

"This is a story I know very well. I'm from Los Angeles and I know countless women who live this kind of life every day, year after year. You see women struggling to keep it all together while a loved one is in jail. But we don't hear about them or their struggles in a way that resonates with others. Their stories are so compelling. It's as if they are in their own little world and no one else sees them. I also wanted to talk about the love between two people in a setting that isn't the norm and how they survive."

=== Filming ===
Middle of Nowhere had a budget of $200,000 and was shot in June 2011 over nineteen days, half of the studio average of forty days. DuVernay told IndieWire's Claire Easton that it was difficult filming over a short period of time and thought that she could have used a couple more days. She continued "It really would just allow us to have more takes, and explore things more. But ultimately, you know, my first film was shot in 15 days, so I gained 4 days. So, one day maybe I'll get out of the teens!"

DuVernay and her crew spent a week filming in a South Los Angeles neighborhood. A "well-maintained Spanish mission-style duplex" on East 91st Street doubled as Ruby's house in the film. DuVernay said "When people think South-Central or Compton, it's all Boyz n the Hood. It's never a house like this. It becomes an assumption that people who live in these communities don't care about their home, don't work as hard for them and don't own their homes. That's one of the reasons why I chose this area. It reminded me of the house I grew up in." Other shooting locations included Inglewood, a federal correction facility in Victorville, Leimert Park, and East Los Angeles. DuVernay wanted to film the movie in places that were authentic to her characters. She also made sure that the locations were used in such a way that they would not detract from the story.

== Release ==
Middle of Nowhere had its world premiere at the Sundance Film Festival held in January 2012. The film opened in the United States on October 12, 2012.

== Reception ==
=== Box office ===
Melissa Silverstein from IndieWire reported that Middle of Nowhere had the top per screen average during its opening weekend. The film opened in six theaters, making $67,909. The following week, it expanded to a further sixteen screens and earned $50,554. As of January 12, 2013, Middle of Nowhere has grossed $236,806.

=== Critical response ===
On the review aggregator website Rotten Tomatoes, 88% of 52 critics' reviews are positive, with an average rating of 7.8/10. The website's consensus reads: "Wise, compassionate, and beautifully acted, Middle of Nowhere offers an early testament to writer-director Ava DuVernay's startling talent." Metacritic, which uses a weighted average, assigned the film a score of 75 out of 100, based on 21 critics, indicating "generally favorable" reviews.

Roger Ebert gave the film three out of four stars and praised Corinealdi's performance, calling it "star-making". Kenneth Turan from the Los Angeles Times stated "Though Middle of Nowhere is very much a character piece, it benefits from some intricate plotting, and going where you think it will go is not on this film's mind. When you question everything about yourself, Ruby has to ask, what do you have to hold onto? We don't often have films that ask questions like these or ones that answer them as effectively." Middle of Nowhere was named one of The New York Times Critics' Pick and Manohla Dargis commented, "A plaintive, slow-boiling, quietly soul-stirring drama about a woman coming into her own, Middle of Nowhere carries the imprimatur of Sundance, but without the dreary stereotypes or self-satisfied politics that can (at times unfairly) characterize its offerings."

=== Accolades ===
Award	Date of ceremony	Category	Recipients and nominees	Result
African-American Film Critics	December 16, 2012	Best Actress	Emayatzy Corinealdi	Won
African-American Film Critics	December 16, 2012	Best Independent Film	Middle of Nowhere	Won
African-American Film Critics	December 16, 2012	Best Music	Kathryn Bostic and Morgan Rhodes	Won
African-American Film Critics	December 16, 2012	Best Picture	Middle of Nowhere	Nominated
African-American Film Critics	December 16, 2012	Best Screenplay	Ava DuVernay	Won
Alliance of Women Film Journalists	January 7, 2013	Best Woman Screenwriter	Ava DuVernay	Nominated
Black Reel Awards	February 7, 2013	Outstanding Actress	Emayatzy Corinealdi	Nominated
Black Reel Awards	February 7, 2013	Outstanding Breakthrough Performance	Emayatzy Corinealdi	Nominated
Black Reel Awards	February 7, 2013	Outstanding Director	Ava DuVernay	Won
Black Reel Awards	February 7, 2013	Outstanding Ensemble	Middle of Nowhere – Aisha Coley	Nominated
Black Reel Awards	February 7, 2013	Outstanding Motion Picture	Middle of Nowhere	Nominated
Black Reel Awards	February 7, 2013	Outstanding Score	Kathryn Bostic	Nominated
Black Reel Awards	February 7, 2013	Outstanding Screenplay	Ava DuVernay	Won
Black Reel Awards	February 7, 2013	Outstanding Supporting Actor	David Oyelowo	Nominated
Black Reel Awards	February 7, 2013	Outstanding Supporting Actress	Lorraine Toussaint	Nominated
Gotham Awards	November 26, 2012	Best Feature	Middle of Nowhere	Nominated
Gotham Awards	November 26, 2012	Breakthrough Actor	Emayatzy Corinealdi	Won
Humanitas Prize	September 14, 2012	Sundance Film	Middle of Nowhere	Nominated
Independent Spirit Awards	February 23, 2013	Best Female Lead	Emayatzy Corinealdi	Nominated
Independent Spirit Awards	February 23, 2013	Best Supporting Female	Lorraine Toussaint	Nominated
Independent Spirit Awards	February 23, 2013	Best Supporting Male	David Oyelowo	Nominated
Independent Spirit Awards	February 23, 2013	John Cassavetes Award	Ava DuVernay, Howard Barish, Paul Garnes	Won
NAACP Image Award	February 1, 2013	Outstanding Actress in a Motion Picture	Emayatzy Corinealdi	Nominated
NAACP Image Award	February 1, 2013	Outstanding Supporting Actor in a Motion Picture	David Oyelowo	Nominated
Sundance Film Festival	January 29, 2012	Directing Award	Ava DuVernay	Won
Sundance Film Festival	January 29, 2012	Grand Jury Prize	Ava DuVernay	Nominated
Women Film Critics Circle	January 1, 2013	Josephine Baker Award	Middle of Nowhere	Won
