= Night Catches Us =

- Directed by: Tanya Hamilton
- Written by: Tanya Hamilton
- Produced by: Sean Costello; Jason Orans; Ron Simons
- Starring: Kerry Washington; Anthony Mackie; Jamie Hector; Wendell Pierce; Amari Cheatom; Tariq Trotter; Novella Nelson; Thomas Roy; Ron Simons
- Cinematography: David Tumblety
- Edited by: John Chimples; Affonso Gonçalves
- Music by: The Roots
- Distributed by: Magnolia Pictures
- Release dates: January 23, 2010 (Sundance); December 3, 2010 (United States)
- Running time: 90 minutes
- Country: United States
- Language: English

Night Catches Us is a 2010 drama film directed and written by Tanya Hamilton and stars Kerry Washington, Anthony Mackie, Jamie Hector, Wendell Pierce and Novella Nelson.

== Plot ==
In 1976, former Black Panther Marcus (Anthony Mackie) returns to his Philadelphia neighborhood to attend his father's funeral. Marcus has been away for several years, part of the time spent in prison on gun running charges and part spent wandering the country. Marcus has a reputation for having snitched on a fellow Panther which led to his death when the police tried to arrest him. Marcus's former friend DoRight (Jamie Hector), now a local gangster, and Marcus's brother Bostic (Tariq Trotter), a Black Muslim, are especially displeased by his return.

However, Patricia (Kerry Washington), the widow of the slain Panther, is more welcoming. She is now a lawyer and lives with her daughter Iris in the same house where her husband was killed. Her younger cousin Jimmy (Amari Cheatom) struggles to make a living with odd jobs, and begins to become more enamored of the Panthers after being harassed by the police. Increasingly hostile to the police, he becomes involved when some men sent by DoRight shoot out the back window of a police car.

Meanwhile, although no one else can understand it, Patricia grows closer to Marcus and when he is kicked out of his brother's home she invites him to stay with her, citing that he will be a positive male influence for her daughter. When Iris grows curious about what happened to her father, Patricia tearfully explains how he had murdered a police officer in retaliation for the killing of two Panthers. She explains that the police arrested her and Marcus tells Iris that he told them where her father was in order to save Patricia from going to jail and keep Iris out of the foster care system.

Wanting to hold DoRight responsible for the shooting of the police car, but lacking evidence, a police officer David Gordon (Wendell Pierce) orders Marcus to plant a gun in DoRight's bar so they can arrest him. Marcus is reluctant, but Gordon insists, threatening to reveal to the neighborhood that it was actually Patricia who had informed on her husband's location and that Marcus had taken the heat for her. Marcus goes to DoRight's bar but refuses to plant the gun.

Meanwhile, Jimmy, who has bought a gun and decked himself out in Panther style beret and jacket, approaches the cop who had harassed him earlier and shoots him. Jimmy flees to his cousin's house, but when the police show up outside, she forces him to leave as she stonewalls the police. Later, the police find Jimmy hiding in a wooded area and shoot him. After this, Marcus asks Patricia to leave Philly with him and put the past behind her. She refuses, and he leaves alone.

== Cast ==
- Kerry Washington as Patricia
- Anthony Mackie as Marcus
- Jamie Hector as DoRight Miller
- Wendell Pierce as David Gordon
- Amari Cheatom as Jimmy Dixon
- Tariq Trotter as Bostic Washington
- Novella Nelson as Eloise
- Thomas Roy as Old Man Harrison
- Ron Simons as Carey Ford

== Production ==
Filming took place in summer 2009 in Philadelphia, Pennsylvania. Director Tanya Hamilton said of the film; "There's a distinct lack of content specific to what it is to be a black American, the variations in that experience, what life is like for people who are ordinary. Those are the stories I want to tell."

Tanya Hamilton has explained that the story, which took her 10 years to finish, was based on her creative ideas mixed with historical facts: "I liked weaving this world of fiction and pieces of fact, but I didn't want to feel like I was getting it wrong, so I just did my thing. It's really just about people, and that I thought I could understand."

== Music ==
The film in its entirety was scored by The Roots, a hip-hop band from Philadelphia, Pennsylvania.

== Reception ==
Night Catches Us debuted at the 26th Sundance Film Festival, and has since received positive critical reviews. Melissa Anderson of The Village Voice said "Tanya Hamilton's striking debut is the rare American-independent film to go beyond the private dramas of its protagonists, imagining them as players in broader historical moments..." On the review aggregator website Rotten Tomatoes, 79% of 58 critics' reviews are positive. The website's consensus reads: "A bold, original debut, Night Catches Us personalizes a tumultuous period in American history thanks to strong performances from Anthony Mackie and Kerry Washington." Metacritic, which uses a weighted average, assigned the film a score of 65 out of 100, based on 18 critics, indicating "generally favorable" reviews.

In the Chicago Sun-Times, film critic Roger Ebert gave the film 3 stars, writing:

In the late 1960s, revolution seemed to be in the air. Not a revolt powerful enough to topple the government, but one intense enough to threaten its expectations. Then the war was over, the draft was ended, and the moment had passed. Night Catches Us takes place in Philadelphia of 1976 when the Black Panthers are still alive in the memory...

The film leads to no showy conclusion, no spectacular climax. It is about movement possible within the soul even in difficult times. The writer-director, Tanya Hamilton, faces the problem of all directors of period films, and solves them here by re-creating the Black Panther period in B&W news photos. That's about right. Even a few years later, that's somehow how it's remembered in the mind. The Panthers feeding kids breakfast. The Panthers in their black berets. The fiercely identical anger and resolve in their faces. All over with. Leaving Marcus and Patricia to get on with things.

== Awards and nominations ==
- African-American Film Critics Association
  - Best Picture (Top 10 Finalist)
  - Winner, Best Screenplay (Adapted or Original): Tanya Hamilton
- Black Reel Awards
  - Winner, Best Film
  - Winner, Best Actress (Kerry Washington)
  - Winner, Best Actor (Anthony Mackie)
  - Nominee, Best Director (Tanya Hamilton)
  - Winner, Best Screenplay, Adapted or Original (Tanya Hamilton)
  - Winner, Best Original Score (The Roots)
  - Nominee, Best Ensemble
  - Nominee, Best Breakthrough Performance (Amari Cheatom)
- Gotham Awards
  - Nominee, Breakthrough Director Award: Tanya Hamilton
- Independent Spirit Award
  - Nominee, Best First Feature
- NAACP Image Awards
  - Nominee, Best Directing in a Motion Picture or Television Movie/Mini-Series (Tanya Hamilton)
  - Nominee, Outstanding Independent Motion Picture
  - Nominee, Outstanding Actor in a Motion Picture (Anthony Mackie)
  - Nominee, Outstanding Actress in a Motion Picture (Kerry Washington)

== See also ==
- List of black films of the 2010s
