= Amari Cheatom =

American actor

Amari Cheatom is an American actor. He is known for his roles in Django Unchained and Crown Heights.

== Filmography ==
Year	Movie	Role	Notes
2008	Midnight Club: Los Angeles	Raymond	Videogame
2009	Grand Theft Auto IV: The Lost and Damned	The New Crowd of Liberty City	Videogame
2009	Giver Taker Heartbreaker	Clarence	
2010	Numbers	Eddie Leyva	1 episode
2010	Night Catches Us	Jimmy Dixon	
2010	Detroit 1-8-7	Jake Silva	1 episode
2011	Georgetown	Jack McManus	TV movie
2011	Chase	Stephen "Little Boy" Washington	1 episode
2012	Django Unchained	Roy	
2013	Newlyweds	Lyle	
2015	Brick and Lulu	Brick	Short film
2015	Knucklehead	Julian	
2015	FLAUNT: My Clone Sleeps Alone	The Actor	Video short
2016	Complete Silence	Fio	Short film
2016	The Alchemist Cookbook	Cortez	
2016	Love Under New Management: The Miki Howard Story	Eddie	
2017	Crown Heights	Leon Grant	
2017	Through You	James	Short film
2017	Detroit	Undercover Cop	
2017	Roman J. Israel, Esq.	Carter Johnson	
2018	Relaxer	Cortez	
2021	Judas and the Black Messiah	Rod Collins	

== Awards and nominations ==
Year	Nominated	Best Breakthrough Performance
2011	Black Reel	Night Catches Us (2010)
