= Just Wright =

- Theatrical poster
- Directed by: Sanaa Hamri
- Written by: Michael Elliot
- Produced by: Debra Martin Chase; Queen Latifah; Shakim Compere
- Starring: Queen Latifah; Common; Paula Patton
- Cinematography: Terry Stacey
- Edited by: Melissa Kent
- Music by: Wendy Melvoin; Lisa Coleman
- Production companies: Dune Entertainment; Flavor Unit Entertainment; Martin Chase Productions
- Distributed by: Fox Searchlight Pictures
- Release date: May 14, 2010
- Running time: 101 minutes
- Country: United States
- Language: English
- Budget: $12 million
- Box office: $21.5 million

Just Wright is a 2010 American romantic comedy-drama film directed by Sanaa Hamri, starring Queen Latifah and Common. The film tells the story of a physical therapist, Leslie Wright, who falls in love with a professional basketball player, Scott McKnight. It received mixed reviews from critics. The film was released in the United States on May 14, 2010.

== Plot ==
Leslie Wright, a physical therapist and die-hard basketball fan, is searching for a boyfriend but keeps being told by men that they see her only as a friend. After buying a house, Leslie allows her impulsive and irresponsible godsister Morgan Alexander to stay at her home; Morgan dreams of becoming an NBA trophy wife.

Following a game between the New Jersey Nets and the Orlando Magic, Leslie helps the Nets' star player Scott McKnight at a gas station. They share a friendly conversation about basketball and jazz, and Scott invites Leslie to his birthday party. Leslie attends the party but also brings Morgan who quickly sets her sights on Scott. Intent on getting his interest, Morgan pretends to volunteer at a homeless shelter and claims to have no interest in Scott at all. He is intrigued and tracks her down. After dating for three months, he proposes and, while Leslie expresses some skepticism about the relationship, she is ultimately pleased that Morgan is happy.

At the All-Star Game, Scott suffers a torn PCL injury that puts his entire career in jeopardy. Morgan becomes suspicious of Scott's physical therapist, a beautiful blonde woman, and begs Leslie to take over as his live-in physical therapist. However, tensions arise as Morgan is now forced to spend more time with Scott and finds herself disliking him. As rumors circle that Scott's career could quickly end if he doesn't recover by the playoffs, Morgan decides to leave Scott by leaving him a letter.

Despite the awkward breakup, Leslie continues to work with Scott. She earlier caught a cold and then Scott takes good care of Leslie. She also encourages and helps him with his recovery and helps to build his confidence. They also bond over their mutual love of basketball and music. Scott expresses surprise that Leslie is not seeing anyone and begins to see her in a more romantic light and she discovers that he plays piano, a talent he confides is his secret hobby.

Scott is able to return to the NBA just before the playoffs and wins his first game back after a pep-talk from Leslie. Scott's team is headed back to the NBA finals. After that impressive win, the Nets are offering him a five-year contract to finish out the series. As a thank you, he presents her with her grandfather's classic Mustang which he has had remodeled and restored, but also paid extra to leave a dent in the side door intact as Leslie says it reminds her of her grandfather. After taking her to dinner, they first share a kiss, and then spend the night together.

The next morning, Morgan arrives at Scott's door hoping to reconcile, saying that she has been in therapy to work on the abandonment issues which led her to leave Scott in the first place. Heartbroken, Leslie believes she has no chance against Morgan and decides to leave. Scott, who feels he owes it to Morgan to try to work things out, reluctantly lets Leslie go.

However, tensions quickly arise between Morgan and Scott as she continues planning their wedding while he wants to take things slow. Meanwhile, Leslie is surprised to discover she's being headhunted by many basketball teams impressed by her notable work helping Scott's recovery from his injury. Excited to get an offer from the Nets, Leslie realizes she would have to work with Scott and reluctantly turns the offer down. She then decides to interview with teams far from where she lives to put some distance between Scott, Morgan, and herself.

During a televised interview, Scott credits Leslie with his recovery. After praising her, he comes to the realization that he loves her. Morgan, who has been watching the interview, also realizes Scott's feelings and urges him to reunite with Leslie.

Chasing Leslie to a job interview in Philadelphia, Scott tells her that he loves her and urges her to reconcile with him despite the anger she might feel. In response, Leslie places a phone call to the Nets and accepts a position with them.

A year later, Leslie and Morgan are watching Scott play. Leslie is now one of the Nets' athletic trainers and cheers loudly for Scott, who is at last revealed to be her husband.

== Cast ==
- Queen Latifah as Leslie Wright
- Common as Scott McKnight
- Paula Patton as Morgan Alexander
- James Pickens Jr. as Lloyd Wright
- Pam Grier as Janice Wright
- Phylicia Rashad as Ella McKnight
- Laz Alonso as Mark Matthews
- Mehcad Brooks as Angelo Bembrey
- Michael Landes as Nelson Kaspian
- Leo Allen as Paul
- Dwight Howard as himself
- Dwyane Wade as himself
- Rashard Lewis as himself
- Bobby Simmons as himself
- Jalen Rose as himself
- Rajon Rondo as himself
- Marv Albert as himself
- Kenny Smith as himself
- Mike Fratello as himself
- Stuart Scott as himself
- Elton Brand as himself
- J.J. Redick as himself

== Production ==
Part of the film was shot at Regis High School in New York City. It was also filmed at Meadowlands Arena (named Izod Center at the time).

== Reception ==
Just Wright received mixed reviews from movie critics. On the review aggregator website Rotten Tomatoes, 47% of 112 critics' reviews are positive, with an average rating of 5.2/10. The website's consensus reads: "Well-intentioned but formulaic, Just Wright has winning leads but can't overcome its preponderance of cliches." Metacritic, which uses a weighted average, assigned the film a score of 51 out of 100, based on 26 critics, indicating "mixed or average" reviews. Conversely, Roger Ebert gave the film 3 stars out of 4.

The film debuted at number four behind Iron Man 2, Robin Hood and Letters to Juliet with $8,284,989 million on its opening weekend. Just Wright grossed $21,540,363 million domestically and $29,900 globally to a total of $21,570,263 million worldwide.

== Awards ==
Year	Award	Category	Recipients	Result
2010	Teen Choice Awards	Choice Movie: Romantic Comedy		Nominated
2010	Teen Choice Awards	Choice Movie Actress: Romantic Comedy	Queen Latifah	Nominated
2011	Black Reel Awards	Best Film		Nominated
2011	Black Reel Awards	Best Director	Sanaa Hamri	Nominated
2011	Black Reel Awards	Best Screenplay, Adapted or Original	Michael Elliot	Nominated
2011	Black Reel Awards	Best Actress	Queen Latifah	Nominated
2011	Black Reel Awards	Best Original or Adapted Song	"Champion"	Nominated
2011	NAACP Image Award	Outstanding Motion Picture		Nominated
2011	NAACP Image Award	Outstanding Writing in a Motion Picture (Theatrical or Television)	Michael Elliot	Won
2011	NAACP Image Award	Outstanding Actress in a Motion Picture	Queen Latifah	Nominated
2011	NAACP Image Award	Outstanding Actor in a Motion Picture	Common	Nominated

== See also ==
- List of basketball films
- List of black films of the 2010s
