= Ron Simons =

American actor (1960–2024)

- Publicity photo of Ron Simons
- Born: November 30, 1960; Detroit, Michigan, U.S.
- Died: June 12, 2024 (aged 63)
- Education: Columbia University (BA, MBA); University of Washington (MFA)
- Occupations: Actor, producer
- Years active: 1996–2024
- Awards: Tony Awards (2013)

Ronald Keith Simons (November 30, 1960 – June 12, 2024) was an American actor and producer. He was a four-time Tony Award winner.

== Career ==
Simons had degrees in theater and computer science from Columbia University, and did not go to drama school until he was 39. He also received a degree from Columbia Business School. He had wanted to go into acting since high school, but was unable to due to his living circumstances. "[A]s the only member of my family to have graduated college with retired grandparents and a mom who had me at a slightly older age, I felt the need to become the family breadwinner." He finally quit corporate business to enter film business at the age of 41. He further expanded into producing despite not being fully aware of what that position entailed. He would end up producing films such as Gun Hill Road and Blue Caprice, but continue to act in projects along the way.

In 2009 he founded SimonSays Entertainment; a production company that works to create film, television and stage productions that revolve around various minority focused subjects from race, LGBT, disabled, women and elder people.

In April 2022, he was named the commencement speaker for the University of Washington. He was a 2018 recipient of Columbia College's John Jay Award.

== Death ==
Simons died on June 12, 2024, at the age of 63.

== Filmography ==
Television roles
Year	Title	Role	Notes
1996	Nowhere Man	Attendant	Episode: "Forever Jung"
2005	Jonny Zero	Reporter	Episode: "I Did It All for the Nooky"
2005	Law & Order	Fire Marshal	Episode: "Dining Out"
2007	Law & Order: Criminal Intent	Sgt. Rapp	Episode: "Brother's Keeper"
2007	Law & Order: Criminal Intent	Detective Willis	Episode: "Self-made"
2009	Law & Order	Warden Derek Kleban	Episode: "Boy Gone Astray"
2015	Law & Order: Special Victims Unit	Principal Al Pompeo	Episode: "Transgender Bridge"
2017	Marvel's The Defenders	Strieber	Miniseries; Recurring
2018	Succession	Photographer #1	Episode: "Celebration"
2018	Marvel's Daredevil	Strieber	Episode: "Reunion"
2019	The Resident (TV series)	Otto	Episode: "Stupid Things in the Name of Sex"

Film roles
Year	Title	Role	Notes
2007	The Assassin	Task Force Det.	
2008	27 Dresses	Boathouse Chef	
2008	Phoebe in Wonderland	Colleague #1	
2009	Mystery Team	Mr. Rogers	
2010	Night Catches Us	Carey Ford	Also producer
2011	Gun Hill Road	Office Manager	Also producer and executive producer
2013	Blue Caprice	Supermarket Manager	Also producer and executive producer
2016	Wolves	Edward	
2016	The Ticket	Pastor Jennings	
2016	King Cobra	Hardy	Also producer and executive producer
2016	Ordinary World	Drew	
2017	Ambition's Debt	Popilius Lena	
2018	Then Came You	Dr. Collins	
2019	After the Wedding	Richard	
2024	Viva Verdi!	—N/a	Producer

Video game roles
Year	Title	Role
1998	Police Quest: SWAT 2	Chief
2005	The Warriors	Dealer
