= Buzzard (film) =

2014 American black comedy film

- Directed by: Joel Potrykus
- Written by: Joel Potrykus
- Produced by: Joel Potrykus; Ashley Young; Michael Saunders; Kevin Clancy; Tim Saunders
- Starring: Joshua Burge; Joel Potrykus; Teri Ann Nelson; Joe Anderson; Chris Kotcher; Katie Call; Alan Longstreet; Crystal Hilliard; Rico Bruce Wade; Michael Cunningham; Lisa Mueller; Scott Basden; Trpl Blk
- Cinematography: Adam J. Minnick
- Distributed by: Oscilloscope Laboratories
- Release dates: March 8, 2014 (SXSW); March 6, 2015
- Running time: 97 minutes
- Country: United States

Buzzard is a 2014 American independent black comedy film written and directed by Joel Potrykus, starring Joshua Burge as Marty Jackitansky.

== Plot ==
The film follows angry mortgage temp Marty as he cooks up small scams against the hated corporate world he's stuck in. Frustrated by the boring nature of his work and the low pay, Marty uses his low level crime as an outlet to rebel. He goes to a bank and opens checking accounts to get free deposits, takes items from his job to a local office supplies store for fraudulent refunds and intentionally injures his hand for workers’ compensation. One day on the job at First National Bank, Marty swipes a stack of refund checks from the company, then forges the payees' signatures to sign several of the checks over to himself. Later Marty's boss, Carol, tells him that the company receives images of the checks when they are cashed and can see who is cashing them. Fearing his scheme will be discovered, Marty goes into hiding at his co-worker, Derek Skiba's basement.

While in hiding, Marty wastes his days playing video games, goofing off with Derek and sucking down Mountain Dew and frozen pizzas. He also starts crafting a weapon made out of steak knives and a Nintendo Power Glove inspired by Freddy Krueger's bladed glove from the Nightmare on Elm Street movies. Derek tells Carol that Marty is sick and can't come into work, but bungles the lie and Marty soon begins to think Carol is close to discovering what happened to the checks. Marty starts to run low on cash, and on a trip to the convenience store at Derek's behest the cashier cheats him out of five dollars, with security cameras capturing Marty trashing a store display in response.

Fearing someone will discover him based on the tape, Marty hops a bus to Detroit, bringing along his modified Nintendo Power Glove. He uses up most of his remaining money when he stays at a hotel and orders room service. In the bathroom, Marty tends to his hand and discovers that the cut has become badly infected. Needing somewhere else to stay, Marty goes to a cheap motel for a night and illegally copies his room key. After checking out he breaks into the hotel to sleep, only to be discovered in the morning by a maid. The hotel manager confronts him and tries to call the police, but Marty threatens him with the glove and runs off. Marty tries to cash his remaining stolen checks at an ATM, but discovers that his account has been shut down. He then goes to a payday loan provider to attempt to cash the checks, but the owner finds the transaction suspicious and accuses Marty of fraud. The owner, having caught Marty on security camera and identified him using his drivers license, calls the police and tries to keep Marty in a back room. Marty slashes the owner in the face and neck with the glove to once again escape, and leaves the owner lying on the floor bleeding profusely.

Marty speaks on the phone with Derek and discovers that Carol has been fired. Believing this means the company won't discover his check scheme, Marty starts ecstatically racing down the street. Eventually Marty comes to an electronics store window full of TV screens, in which he sees himself caught on camera. On the center TV, he sees an image of himself walking away, and proceeds to do so.

== Cast ==
- Joshua Burge as Marty Jackitansky
- Joel Potrykus as Derek Skiba

== Release ==
Buzzard made its world premiere at SXSW in 2014, and its international premiere at the 2014 Locarno Film Festival. It received theatrical distribution in North America on March 6, 2015 through Oscilloscope Laboratories.

== Reception ==
Buzzard has received generally favorable reviews from critics. Rotten Tomatoes gives the film a score of 87%, based on 45 reviews. Metacritic gave the film a rating of 77/100, based on 15 reviews.
