= Tanya Hamilton =

American film director and producer

- Occupations: Film director, producer

Tanya Hamilton (born in Spanish Town, Jamaica) is an American film director and producer. She came to the United States at the age of eight, and settled in Maryland with her mother. She attended Duke Ellington School of the Arts, Cooper Union for the Advancement of Science and Art, and Columbia University.

Hamilton's first project was a short film entitled The Killers, which was released in 1997. This work won awards at the Berlin International Film Festival and New Line Cinema. Her first feature film was Night Catches Us, a portrayal of former Black Panthers reuniting in 1976 Philadelphia. In 2011, Hamilton received an Athena Film Festival award for directing, as well as Black Reel Award nomination for best director for this film. It was also nominated for an Independent Spirit Awards, four Image Awards, a Gotham Awards and the Sundance Film Festival Grand Jury Prize.

== Filmography ==
Year	Film	Role	Notes
1995	The Killers	Director/Writer	Short film
1999	Split Screen	Director/Writer	TV series, 1 episode
2010	Night Catches Us	Director/Writer	Debut feature film
2014	Molly	Director	Movie
2016	Queen Sugar	Director	TV series, 1 episode
2016	The Vampire Diaries	Director	TV series, 1 episode
2017	American Crime	Director	TV series, 1 episode
2017	Famous in Love	Director	TV series, 1 episode
2017	Greenleaf	Director	TV series, 2 episodes
2018	Seven Seconds	Director	TV series, 1 episode
2018	Black Lightning	Director	TV series, 1 episode
2017	Love Is_	Director	TV series, 1 episode
2018	The Deuce	Director	TV series, 2 episodes
2019	Berlin Station	Director	TV series, 2 episode
2019	The Chi	Director	TV series, 3 episode
2019	Scream	Director	TV series, 1 episode
2019	Snowfall	Director	TV series, 1 episodes
2019	The Deuce	Director	TV series, 2 episodes
2019	Godfather of Harlem	Director	TV series, 2 episodes
2020	Cherish the Day	Director	TV series, 2 episodes
2022	Big Sky	Director	TV series, 1 episodes
2022	Winning Time: The Rise of the Lakers Dynasty	Director	TV series, 4 episodes
2024	Fight Night: The Million Dollar Heist	Director	TV miniseries, 2 episodes
2024	Get Millie Black	Director	TV series, 2 episodes
2025	Dope Thief	Director	TV series, 1 episode
