= For Colored Girls =

2010 film by Tyler Perry

- Theatrical release poster
- Directed by: Tyler Perry
- Screenplay by: Tyler Perry
- Based on: For Colored Girls Who Have Considered Suicide / When the Rainbow Is Enuf by Ntozake Shange
- Produced by: Tyler Perry; Roger M. Bobb; Paul Hall
- Starring: Janet Jackson; Loretta Devine; Kimberly Elise; Thandiwe Newton; Anika Noni Rose; Tessa Thompson; Kerry Washington; Whoopi Goldberg; Phylicia Rashad
- Cinematography: Alexander Gruszynski
- Edited by: Maysie Hoy
- Music by: Aaron Zigman
- Production companies: 34th Street Films; Tyler Perry Studios
- Distributed by: Lionsgate
- Release date: November 5, 2010
- Running time: 133 minutes
- Country: United States
- Language: English
- Budget: $21 million
- Box office: $38 million

For Colored Girls is a 2010 American drama film written, directed, and produced by Tyler Perry, and is adapted from Ntozake Shange's 1975 original choreopoem "For Colored Girls Who Have Considered Suicide / When the Rainbow Is Enuf". The film features an ensemble cast including Janet Jackson, Whoopi Goldberg, Phylicia Rashad, Thandiwe Newton, Loretta Devine, Anika Noni Rose, Tessa Thompson, Kimberly Elise, and Kerry Washington. The film was originally to be directed by Nzingha Stewart, who served as an executive producer on Perry’s adaptation of Shange’s work.

The film's ensemble cast consists of ten Black women—seven of whom correspond to Shange's color-coded "Ladies"—and explores their experiences as women of color. Each character deals with a different personal conflict, such as love, abandonment, rape, infidelity, and abortion. It was the first film to be produced by 34th Street Films, an imprint of Tyler Perry Studios, and the first R-rated film directed by Perry.

== Plot ==
Nine African-American women living in New York City, each character corresponds to one of "Ladies" from the choreopoem by Ntozake Shange.

Social worker Kelly Watkins comes to the apartment of Crystal Wallace to visit her children but is told to leave by Crystal's abusive husband, a veteran and an alcoholic, Beau Willie Brown. Apartment manager Gilda then tells Kelly that she asked Social Services for help concerning the safety of Crystal. Elsewhere, Juanita Sims separates from her unfaithful boyfriend Frank while Alice Adrose begs for money from her daughter, Tangie.

Later, Alice meets a dance instructor, Yasmine, who tells her students about a man she has just met called Bill. One of the students, Nyla, Tangie's sister, talks about her coming graduation but becomes sick. Juanita asks for some financial assistance from the magazine editor, Joanna "Jo" Bradmore, for her women health nonprofit organization, but Jo does not want to give any. Kelly is also informed that she is infertile owing to the sexually transmitted disease she suffered long ago.

Crystal tells Beau Willie that he must stop drinking alcohol but he declares that they must marry to receive welfare aid. Meanwhile, Yasmine starts seeing Bill and Alice unintentionally gives money to Nyla as she believes it to be for her college expenses. Tangie notices the Nyla's pregnancy and thinks that she is going to have an illegal abortion, but Nyla denies it.

Jo temporarily reconciles with her husband Carl after his arrest, even though Carl's attraction to other men becomes more and more apparent. Later, Tangie finds out that Nyla is going to have an abortion and that Nyla was paying for her dance classes. During a dinner together, Yasmine is violently raped by Bill.

At the opera, Jo watches how Carl openly shows interest in another man. Crystal comes back home and Beau Willie accuses her of infidelity. In a drunken psychological breakdown, he pushes Crystal's two children out of the window, killing them despite Gilda, Jo, Juanita and the neighbors' attempts to prevent it.

At the hospital, Kelly is shocked to learn of Crystal's tragedy while Donald tells Yasmine that prosecuting Bill will not be easy. Alice looks for Nyla who talks to Kelly and another counselor.

Alice confronts Tangie and they tell each other about the sexual abuse perpetrated by Alice's father. Alice confesses that she didn't dare to tell about her experience, and Tangie shares how the abuse affected her life. Later, Gilda comes to Tangie and tells her about her hard past, advising her to become different.

Frank tries to reconcile with Juanita but she is not ready to continue her relationship with him. Jo tells Carl about Beau Willie's crime, and Alice wants to make Nyla pray and perform an exorcism ceremony. Afraid, Nyla goes to Yasmine's apartment, who cannot react as she is in shock after the rape.

Kelly finds Crystal and sees her trying to wash away her children's blood from the sidewalk near their apartment. She takes Nyla into the apartment and Tangie defends her sister as a man Tangie had invited to her apartment offers to involve Nyla in their tryst. The sisters start repairing their relationship.

Trying to overcome the shock, Yasmine dances while Kelly understands that Crystal tried to commit suicide, having taken pills. Doctors manage to save her life. Donald later informs Yasmine that Bill was killed after attacking another woman. Yasmine goes to the morgue, slaps Bill's body, then leaves.

Using her own experience with Frank, Juanita teaches the women at the community center about self-respect and abuse in relationships. Tangie invites Crystal to join the group and Gilda advises her to accept this help. At the same time, Jo tells Carl about her HIV-positive status, and asks him for a divorce.

At the community center, the women meet to dance, talk about their experiences, and help each other. Alice tells Nyla that she is proud of her. Jo joins the group and discusses betrayal, disease and survival with Juanita. On the roof, the women confirm each other's strength and embrace Crystal.

== Cast ==
- Janet Jackson as Joanna "Jo" Bradmore ("Lady in Red")
- Thandiwe Newton as Tangie Adrose ("Lady in Orange") (credited as "Thandie Newton")
- Anika Noni Rose as Yasmine ("Lady in Yellow")
- Loretta Devine as Juanita Sims ("Lady in Green")
- Kerry Washington as Kelly Watkins ("Lady in Blue")
- Tessa Thompson as Nyla Adrose ("Lady in Purple")
- Kimberly Elise as Crystal Wallace ("Lady in Brown")
- Whoopi Goldberg as Alice Adrose ("Lady in White")
- Phylicia Rashad as Gilda ("Lady in Black")
- Macy Gray as Rose ("Lady in Pink")
- Michael Ealy as Beau Willie Brown
- Omari Hardwick as Carl Bradmore
- Hill Harper as Donald Watkins
- Khalil Kain as Bill
- Richard Lawson as Frank

== Production ==
On September 3, 2009, Lionsgate announced it had acquired the distribution rights to Tyler Perry's 34th Street Films adaptation of the play, with principal photography originally scheduled to take place in Atlanta, Georgia in November and December 2009, with a planned 2010 release. The film was written, directed, and produced by Perry. The cast includes Loretta Devine, Kimberly Elise, Whoopi Goldberg, Janet Jackson, Phylicia Rashad, Anika Noni Rose, Kerry Washington, Thandiwe Newton, and Tessa Thompson. Mariah Carey had also been cast, but pulled out in May 2010, citing medical reasons (later revealed to be her pregnancy); Thandiwe Newton was cast to replace her. Macy Gray was also cast.

Originally using the play's full title, the film's title was shortened to For Colored Girls in September 2010. In an October 2010 press conference with the cast, Perry credited his full body of work for being able to make the film, stating, "It took everything—Madea, House of Payne and all of that—for me to be able to do For Colored Girls. Had none of that happened I wouldn't have been able to say, 'Listen, this is what I want to do next,' so I’m very proud of it all."

When asked if she held reservations about Perry's adaptation of her work, Shange responded: "I had a lot of qualms. I worried about his characterizations of women as plastic." In reference to the film post-production, she stated, "I think he did a very fine job, although I'm not sure I would call it a finished film."

== Soundtrack ==
For Colored Girls: Music From and Inspired by the Original Motion Picture Soundtrack was released on November 2, 2010. It features music from the cast, as well as Leona Lewis and Nina Simone.

== Release ==
The film was originally planned for a 2010 release, but was later delayed until January 14, 2011. However, the studio chose to move the release date forward to November 5, 2010; Tyler Perry commented it was "a serious film that really lends itself to the Fall period." Grossing $20.1 million in its opening weekend, For Colored Girls debuted at the box office at #3, behind Megamind ($47.7 million) and Due Date ($33.5 million).

== Critical reception ==
On Metacritic the film received a weighted average score of 50 out of 100, based on 33 reviews, which indicates "mixed or average" reviews. On Rotten Tomatoes, 31% of 106 critics gave the film a positive review, with an average rating of 5.20/10. The site's consensus is that "Tyler Perry has assembled a fine cast for this adaptation of the 1975 play, and his heart is obviously in the right place, but his fondness for melodrama cheapens a meaningful story". Audiences polled by CinemaScore gave it a grade "A" on a scale from A+ to F.

Early reviews from a private screening by Variety and The Hollywood Reporter were negative. Peter DeBruge of Variety stated that "[i]n adapting Ntozake Shange's Tony-nominated play—a cycle of poetic monologues about abuse, abortion and other issues facing modern black women, rather than a traditional narrative—the do-it-all auteur demonstrates an ambition beyond any of his previous work. And yet the result falls squarely in familiar territory, better acted and better lit, perhaps, but more inauthentically melodramatic than ever." Despite an overall negative view of the film's plot and direction, DeBruge gives praise to the acting of its principal cast.

Kirk Honeycutt of The Hollywood Reporter highlighted the difficulty in translating Shange's poetic play to film. He commented: "No, it never was going to be easy, but someone needed to put creative sweat into this one, to reach for cinematic solutions to the theatrical challenge. All Perry does is force conventional plots and characters—utter cliches without lives or souls—into the fabric of Shange's literary work. The hackneyed melodramas get him from one poem to the next but run roughshod over the collective sense of who these women are." Honeycutt acknowledged the talents of the film's actresses, highlighting performances by Phylicia Rashad, Anika Noni Rose, and Kimberly Elise.

Critic Marshall Fine gave a negative review in The Huffington Post. He asserts Perry's screenplay is inadequate for its source material, stating that each character "gets the opportunity to suddenly burst into Shange's poetic arias. But the connective tissue that links the various stories ... amounts to a college course in black social pathology—or perhaps just human pathology." Acknowledging the acting talent of the ensemble cast, he states: "Don't get me wrong. The women of this film all shine, hitting strong emotional notes that ring true even when Perry's adaptation feels false ... So let's just say that For Colored Girls is a barely competent film (which is a big step up for Perry), illuminated by luminous performances."

Lisa Schwarzbaum of Entertainment Weekly comments: "The female cast is great, with especially fierce performances from Loretta Devine, Kimberly Elise, Phylicia Rashad, and Anika Noni Rose. But stuck in a flailing production that might just as well invite Perry's signature drag creation Madea to the block party, the actors' earnest work isn't enuf."

Claudia Puig of USA Today called the film a "strained soap opera" which "has wrung the beauty and truth out of the original in almost every way possible." Mary Pols of Time magazine states that despite the caliber of the cast, "Elise's performance is the only restrained one in the film and her Crystal is For Colored Girls' most compelling character." She concludes that "For Colored Girls feels like the cinematic equivalent to putting a garish reproduction of the Sistine Chapel on the ceiling of your McMansion and calling it art."

In contrast, a review by Shadow and Act was favorable, calling For Colored Girls "the best thing Perry has done to date." Perry is complimented on his cinematography, and use of "subtlety and nuance", although his screenwriting is still considered to be the weakest aspect of the film. Like previous reviews, praise is given to the acting quality of the cast, especially regarding performances given by Thandiwe Newton, Janet Jackson, and Kimberly Elise. The Huffington Post journalist Jenee Darden gave a mixed review. She comments that Perry's modern plot conflicts with the narrative of Shange's poetry which was written during the 1970s, explaining: "The film is set in the present and black people don't use the word 'colored' anymore. Watching a character type on a laptop then hearing someone describe themselves as 'colored' a few scenes later doesn't feel realistic."

She commends the acting of the cast, stating "Kimberly Elise stirs you as always. Loretta Devine is funny and vivid. Thandie Newton delivers as a troubled, selfish sex addict. She and Whoopi were matched perfectly as a mother and daughter with serious tensions. Singer Macy Gray's eerie portrayal of a back-alley abortionist will make you rethink ever having unsafe sex." Roger Ebert comments that "Shange's award-winning play is justly respected, but I'm not sure it’s filmmable, and I’m pretty sure it wasn't a wise choice for Perry ... That’s not to say 'For Colored Girls' doesn't have its virtues. Seeing these actresses together is a poignant reminder of their gifts, and of the absence of interesting roles for actresses in general and African-American ones in particular."

Betsy Sharkey of the Los Angeles Times gave a positive review, stating that "[w]ith a surgical precision, the writer-director cut [Shange's poetry] apart and reassembled it, using various pieces to create characters and storylines, keeping much of the poetry, writing the connective tissue himself so that it finds a new life, a somewhat different life on screen," and said it is his most "mature" film to-date. Commenting on the acting of the ensemble cast, she states: "Newton's Tangie swings too wildly; Goldberg's Alice, clad in white and rage, never finds traction; and Rashad, as the apartment manager Gilda, the central link between many of the characters, never quite connects, so it often feels as if she's walked onto the wrong stage" but adds that "[w]hatever stumbles there may be, they are offset by moments when 'For Colored Girls' soars," ultimately describing the film as "unforgettable."

Mick LaSalle of the San Francisco Chronicle called For Colored Girls "a serious achievement." He compliments Perry's work, stating "this new film shows a mastery of tone, a capacity to elicit strong performances and also to bring out different colors within those performances so that, when it all comes together, it's not the same note sounding over and over. This is smart, lovely work." Manohla Dargis of The New York Times called the film "a thunderous storm of a movie." Dargis states that "working with fine performers like Ms. Elise, Anika Noni Rose, Phylicia Rashad and Kerry Washington, he sings the song the way he likes it—with force, feeling and tremendous sincerity."

Matt Zoller Seitz of Salon.com calls For Colored Girls Perry's "most problematic work. It's also his most ambitious." He adds that "Perry never solves the stage-to-screen translation problem. But the path he has chosen is as intriguing as it is irksome, and it works better than you might expect." In terms of acting, he praises Jackson's performance, stating: "[s]he outdoes herself here ... It's not just Jackson's short haircut and traumatized eyes that might remind viewers of Jane Wyman or Joan Crawford; Perry gets at the mix of masculine hyper-competitiveness and feminine vulnerability that has always defined Jackson, and links it to the wily, lonely coldness often captured in Wyman and Crawford performances, a directorial gambit of tremendous perceptiveness." In addition, he says Perry "is just as sharp directing Jackson's costars—especially Elise, Rashad and Devine."

== Accolades ==
For Colored Girls has received accolades primarily from African American film and critic associations, in multiple categories including acting, writing, directing and overall production. Kimberly Elise has received the most acting nominations among the cast, followed by Anika Noni Rose and Phylicia Rashad.

Award	Date of ceremony	Category	Recipient(s)	Result
African-American Film Critics Association	December 13, 2010	Best Picture	For Colored Girls	Nominated
African-American Film Critics Association	December 13, 2010	Best Song	Nina Simone	Won
African-American Film Critics Association	December 13, 2010	Best Supporting Actor	Michael Ealy	Won
African-American Film Critics Association	December 13, 2010	Best Supporting Actress	Kimberly Elise	Won
Black Reel Awards	February 13, 2011	Outstanding Actress	Kimberly Elise	Nominated
Black Reel Awards	February 13, 2011	Outstanding Actress	Thandiwe Newton	Nominated
Black Reel Awards	February 13, 2011	Outstanding Actress	Anika Noni Rose	Nominated
Black Reel Awards	February 13, 2011	Outstanding Breakthrough Performance	Omari Hardwick	Nominated
Black Reel Awards	February 13, 2011	Outstanding Breakthrough Performance	Tessa Thompson	Won
Black Reel Awards	February 13, 2011	Outstanding Director	Tyler Perry	Nominated
Black Reel Awards	February 13, 2011	Outstanding Film	For Colored Girls	Nominated
Black Reel Awards	February 13, 2011	Outstanding Ensemble	For Colored Girls	Won
Black Reel Awards	February 13, 2011	Outstanding Original Score	Aaron Zigman	Nominated
Black Reel Awards	February 13, 2011	Outstanding Original Song	Leona Lewis	Nominated
Black Reel Awards	February 13, 2011	Outstanding Screenplay, Original or Adapted	Tyler Perry	Nominated
Black Reel Awards	February 13, 2011	Outstanding Supporting Actress	Janet Jackson	Nominated
Black Reel Awards	February 13, 2011	Outstanding Supporting Actress	Phylicia Rashad	Won
Black Reel Awards	February 13, 2011	Outstanding Supporting Actress	Kerry Washington	Nominated
Heartland Truly Moving Pictures	2010	Truly Moving Film	For Colored Girls	Won
NAACP Image Awards	March 4, 2011	Outstanding Directing for a Motion Picture/Television Movie	Tyler Perry	Won
NAACP Image Awards	March 4, 2011	Outstanding Motion Picture	For Colored Girls	Won
NAACP Image Awards	March 4, 2011	Outstanding Supporting Actor in a Motion Picture	Michael Ealy	Nominated
NAACP Image Awards	March 4, 2011	Outstanding Supporting Actress in a Motion Picture	Kimberly Elise	Won
NAACP Image Awards	March 4, 2011	Outstanding Supporting Actress in a Motion Picture	Whoopi Goldberg	Nominated
NAACP Image Awards	March 4, 2011	Outstanding Supporting Actress in a Motion Picture	Phylicia Rashad	Nominated
NAACP Image Awards	March 4, 2011	Outstanding Supporting Actress in a Motion Picture	Anika Noni Rose	Nominated

== See also ==
- List of black films of the 2010s
