= Critics' Choice Movie Award for Best Adapted Screenplay =

Award given by the Critics Choice Association

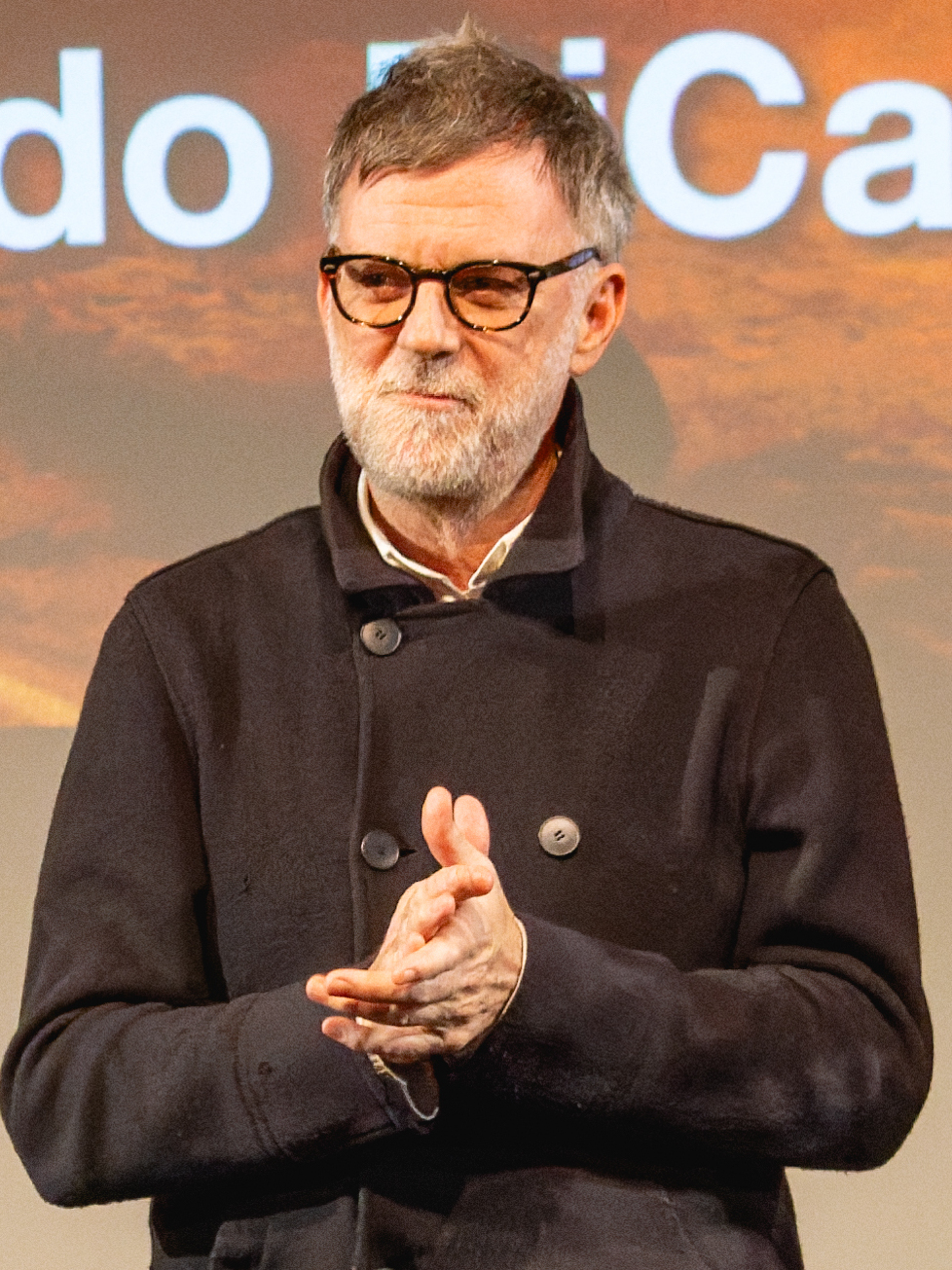
- 2025 recipient: Paul Thomas Anderson
- Awarded for: Best Adapted Screenwriting of a Motion Picture
- Location: Los Angeles, California
- Presented by: Critics Choice Association
- First award: Emma Thompson for Sense and Sensibility (1995)
- Currently held by: Paul Thomas Anderson for One Battle After Another (2025)
- Website: www.criticschoice.com

The Critics' Choice Movie Award for Best Adapted Screenplay is presented by the Critics Choice Association at the annual Critics' Choice Movie Awards.

== History ==
The categories for screenplays have gone through several changes since their inception in 1995:

- From 1995 to 1996, the category Best Screenplay was presented, with no official nominees being announced but instead only a winner.
- From 1997 to 2000, the category was split into two, divided into Best Original Screenplay and Best Screenplay Adaptation.
- In 2001, the categories were merged into Best Screenplay again. From 2002 to 2008, the category was renamed to Best Writer.

In 2009, the distinction between original and adapted was implemented again, with two categories presented ever since, Best Original Screenplay and Best Adapted Screenplay.

== Winners and nominees ==
=== 1990s ===
==== Best Screenplay ====
Year	Writer	Film
1995	Emma Thompson	Sense and Sensibility †
1996	Anthony Minghella	The English Patient

==== Best Screenplay Adaptation ====
Year	Writer(s)	Film	Source material
1997	Brian Helgeland and Curtis Hanson	L.A. Confidential †	The novel by James Ellroy
1998	Scott Smith	A Simple Plan	The novel by Smith
1999	Frank Darabont	The Green Mile	The novel by Stephen King

=== 2000s ===
==== Best Screenplay Adaptation ====
Year	Writer(s)	Film	Source material
2000	Stephen Gaghan (TIE)	Traffic †	The British television serial Traffik by Simon Moore
2000	Steve Kloves (TIE)	Wonder Boys	The novel by Michael Chabon

==== Best Screenplay ====
Year	Writer(s)	Film
2001	Christopher Nolan	Memento
2001	Joel Coen and Ethan Coen	The Man Who Wasn't There
2001	Akiva Goldsman	A Beautiful Mind †

=== Best Writer ===
Year	Writer(s)	Film(s)
2002	Charlie Kaufman	Adaptation. and Confessions of a Dangerous Mind
2002	Alexander Payne and Jim Taylor	About Schmidt
2002	Nia Vardalos	My Big Fat Greek Wedding
2003	Jim Sheridan, Naomi Sheridan, and Kirsten Sheridan	In America
2003	John August	Big Fish
2003	Sofia Coppola	Lost in Translation
2003	Brian Helgeland	Mystic River
2003	Gary Ross	Seabiscuit
2004	Alexander Payne and Jim Taylor	Sideways †
2004	Bill Condon	Kinsey
2004	Charlie Kaufman	Eternal Sunshine of the Spotless Mind
2004	John Logan	The Aviator
2004	David Magee	Finding Neverland
2005	Paul Haggis and Bobby Moresco	Crash
2005	Noah Baumbach	The Squid and the Whale
2005	George Clooney and Grant Heslov	Good Night, and Good Luck.
2005	Dan Futterman	Capote
2005	Larry McMurtry and Diana Ossana	Brokeback Mountain †
2006	Michael Arndt	Little Miss Sunshine
2006	Guillermo Arriaga	Babel
2006	Todd Field and Tom Perrotta	Little Children
2006	Zach Helm	Stranger than Fiction
2006	William Monahan	The Departed †
2006	Peter Morgan	The Queen
2007	Diablo Cody	Juno
2007	Joel Coen and Ethan Coen	No Country for Old Men †
2007	Tony Gilroy	Michael Clayton
2007	Nancy Oliver	Lars and the Real Girl
2007	Sean Penn	Into the Wild
2007	Aaron Sorkin	Charlie Wilson's War
2008	Simon Beaufoy	Slumdog Millionaire †
2008	Dustin Lance Black	Milk
2008	Peter Morgan	Frost/Nixon
2008	Eric Roth	The Curious Case of Benjamin Button
2008	John Patrick Shanley	Doubt

==== Best Adapted Screenplay ====
Year	Writer(s)	Film	Source material
2009	Jason Reitman and Sheldon Turner	Up in the Air	The novel by Walter Kirn
2009	Wes Anderson and Noah Baumbach	Fantastic Mr. Fox	The novel by Roald Dahl
2009	Neill Blomkamp and Terri Tatchell	District 9	The short film Alive in Joburg by Bloomkamp
2009	Geoffrey Fletcher	Precious †	The novel Push by Sapphire
2009	Tom Ford and David Scearce	A Single Man	The novel by Christopher Isherwood
2009	Nick Hornby	An Education	The memoir by Lynn Barber

=== 2010s ===
Year	Writer(s)	Film	Source material(s)
2010	Aaron Sorkin	The Social Network †	The book The Accidental Billionaires by Ben Mezrich
2010	Ben Affleck, Peter Craig, and Aaron Stockard	The Town	The novel Prince of Thieves by Chuck Hogan
2010	Michael Arndt, John Lasseter, Andrew Stanton, and Lee Unkrich	Toy Story 3	The Toy Story films by Pete Docter, Lasseter, Stanton, et al.
2010	Danny Boyle and Simon Beaufoy	127 Hours	The book Between a Rock and a Hard Place by Aron Ralston
2010	Joel Coen and Ethan Coen	True Grit	The novel by Charles Portis
2010	Debra Granik and Anne Rosellini	Winter's Bone	The novel by Daniel Woodrell
2011	Steven Zaillian, Aaron Sorkin, and Stan Chervin	Moneyball	The book by Michael Lewis
2011	John Logan	Hugo	The book The Invention of Hugo Cabret by Brian Selznick
2011	Alexander Payne, Nat Faxon, and Jim Rash	The Descendants †	The novel by Kaui Hart Hemmings
2011	Eric Roth	Extremely Loud & Incredibly Close	The novel by Jonathan Safran Foer
2011	Tate Taylor	The Help	The novel by Kathryn Stockett
2012	Tony Kushner	Lincoln	The book Team of Rivals: The Political Genius of Abraham Lincoln by Doris Kearns Goodwin
2012	Stephen Chbosky	The Perks of Being a Wallflower	The novel by Chbosky
2012	David Magee	Life of Pi	The novel by Yann Martel
2012	David O. Russell	Silver Linings Playbook	The novel by Matthew Quick
2012	Chris Terrio	Argo †	The book The Master of Disguise by Antonio J. Mendez and article "The Great Escape: How the CIA Used a Fake Sci-Fi Flick to Rescue Americans from Tehran" by Joshuah Bearman
2013	John Ridley	12 Years a Slave †	The memoir by Solomon Northup
2013	Steve Coogan and Jeff Pope	Philomena	The book The Lost Child of Philomena Lee by Martin Sixsmith
2013	Tracy Letts	August: Osage County	The play by Letts
2013	Richard Linklater, Ethan Hawke, and Julie Delpy	Before Midnight	The characters from the film Before Sunrise by Linklater and Kim Krizan
2013	Billy Ray	Captain Phillips	The book A Captain's Duty by Richard Phillips and Stephan Talty
2013	Terence Winter	The Wolf of Wall Street	The book by Jordan Belfort
2014	Gillian Flynn	Gone Girl	The novel by Flynn
2014	Paul Thomas Anderson	Inherent Vice	The novel by Thomas Pynchon
2014	Joel Coen, Ethan Coen, Richard LaGravenese, and William Nicholson	Unbroken	The book by Laura Hillenbrand
2014	Nick Hornby	Wild	The memoir by Cheryl Strayed
2014	Anthony McCarten	The Theory of Everything	The memoir Travelling to Infinity: My Life with Stephen by Jane Hawking
2014	Graham Moore	The Imitation Game †	The book Alan Turing: The Enigma by Andrew Hodges
2015	Adam McKay and Charles Randolph	The Big Short †	The book by Michael Lewis
2015	Emma Donoghue	Room	The novel by Emma Donoghue
2015	Drew Goddard	The Martian	The novel by Andy Weir
2015	Nick Hornby	Brooklyn	The novel by Colm Tóibín
2015	Aaron Sorkin	Steve Jobs	The book by Walter Isaacson
2016	Eric Heisserer	Arrival	The novella "Story of Your Life" by Ted Chiang
2016	Luke Davies	Lion	The book A Long Way Home by Saroo Brierley and Larry Buttrose
2016	Tom Ford	Nocturnal Animals	The novel Tony and Susan by Austin Wright
2016	Todd Komarnicki	Sully	The memoir Highest Duty by Chesley Sullenberger and Jeffrey Zaslow
2016	Allison Schroeder and Theodore Melfi	Hidden Figures	The book by Margot Lee Shetterly
2016	August Wilson (posthumous)	Fences	The play by Wilson
2017	James Ivory	Call Me by Your Name †	The novel by André Aciman
2017	Scott Neustadter and Michael H. Weber	The Disaster Artist	The book by Greg Sestero and Tom Bissell
2017	Dee Rees and Virgil Williams	Mudbound	The novel by Hillary Jordan
2017	Aaron Sorkin	Molly's Game	The memoir by Molly Bloom
2017	Jack Thorne, Steven Conrad, and Stephen Chbosky	Wonder	The novel by R. J. Palacio
2018	Barry Jenkins	If Beale Street Could Talk	The novel by James Baldwin
2018	Ryan Coogler and Joe Robert Cole	Black Panther †	The Marvel Comics by Stan Lee and Jack Kirby
2018	Nicole Holofcener and Jeff Whitty	Can You Ever Forgive Me?	The memoir by Lee Israel
2018	Eric Roth, Bradley Cooper, and Will Fetters	A Star Is Born	The 1954 screenplay by Moss Hart and 1976 screenplay by John Gregory Dunne, Joan Didion and Frank Pierson; story by Robert Carson and William Wellman
2018	Josh Singer	First Man	The book by James R. Hansen
2018	Charlie Wachtel, David Rabinowitz, Kevin Willmott, and Spike Lee	BlacKkKlansman	The memoir Black Klansman by Ron Stallworth
2019	Greta Gerwig	Little Women	The novel by Louisa May Alcott
2019	Noah Harpster and Micah Fitzerman-Blue	A Beautiful Day in the Neighborhood	The article "Can You Say ... Hero?" by Tom Junod
2019	Anthony McCarten	The Two Popes	The play The Pope by McCarten
2019	Todd Phillips and Scott Silver	Joker	The characters by Bill Finger, Bob Kane, and Jerry Robinson
2019	Taika Waititi	Jojo Rabbit †	The novel Caging Skies by Christine Leunens
2019	Steven Zaillian	The Irishman	The book I Heard You Paint Houses by Charles Brandt

=== 2020s ===
Year	Writer(s)	Film	Source material
2020	Chloé Zhao	Nomadland	The book by Jessica Bruder
2020	Paul Greengrass and Luke Davies	News of the World	The novel by Paulette Jiles
2020	Kemp Powers	One Night in Miami...	The play by Powers
2020	Jonathan Raymond and Kelly Reichardt	First Cow	The novel The Half Life by Raymond
2020	Ruben Santiago-Hudson	Ma Rainey's Black Bottom	The play by August Wilson
2020	Florian Zeller and Christopher Hampton	The Father †	The play Le Père by Zeller
2021	Jane Campion	The Power of the Dog	The novel by Thomas Savage
2021	Maggie Gyllenhaal	The Lost Daughter	The novel by Elena Ferrante
2021	Sian Heder	CODA †	The film La Famille Bélier by Victoria Bedos, Thomas Bidegain, Stanislas Carré de Malberg, and Éric Lartigau
2021	Tony Kushner	West Side Story	The stage play book by Arthur Laurents
2021	Jon Spaihts, Denis Villeneuve, and Eric Roth	Dune	The novel by Frank Herbert
2022	Sarah Polley	Women Talking †	The novel by Miriam Toews
2022	Samuel D. Hunter	The Whale	The play by Hunter
2022	Kazuo Ishiguro	Living	The film Ikiru by Akira Kurosawa, Shinobu Hashimoto, and Hideo Oguni
2022	Rian Johnson	Glass Onion: A Knives Out Mystery	The film Knives Out by Johnson
2022	Rebecca Lenkiewicz	She Said	The book by Jodi Kantor and Megan Twohey
2023	Cord Jefferson	American Fiction †	The novel Erasure by Percival Everett
2023	Kelly Fremon Craig	Are You There God? It's Me, Margaret.	The novel by Judy Blume
2023	Andrew Haigh	All of Us Strangers	The novel Strangers by Taichi Yamada
2023	Tony McNamara	Poor Things	The novel by Alasdair Gray
2023	Christopher Nolan	Oppenheimer	The book American Prometheus by Kai Bird and Martin J. Sherwin
2023	Eric Roth and Martin Scorsese	Killers of the Flower Moon	The book by David Grann
2024	Peter Straughan	Conclave †	The novel by Robert Harris
2024	Jacques Audiard	Emilia Pérez	The play by Audiard
2024	Winnie Holzman and Dana Fox	Wicked	The musical by Stephen Schwartz and Holzman, and the novel by Gregory Maguire
2024	Clint Bentley and Greg Kwedar	Sing Sing	The article "The Sing Sing Follies" by John Richardson
2024	RaMell Ross and Joslyn Barnes	Nickel Boys	The novel by Colson Whitehead
2024	Denis Villeneuve and Jon Spaihts	Dune: Part Two	The novel Dune by Frank Herbert
2025	Paul Thomas Anderson	One Battle After Another	The novel Vineland by Thomas Pynchon
2025	Clint Bentley and Greg Kwedar	Train Dreams	The novel by Denis Johnson
2025	Park Chan-wook, Lee Kyoung-mi, Don McKellar, and Jahye Lee	No Other Choice	The novel The Ax by Donald E. Westlake
2025	Guillermo del Toro	Frankenstein	Based on novel by Mary Shelley
2025	Will Tracy	Bugonia	The film Save the Green Planet! by Jang Joon-hwan
2025	Chloé Zhao and Maggie O'Farrell	Hamnet	The novel by O'Farrell

== See also ==
- Golden Globe Award for Best Screenplay
- BAFTA Award for Best Adapted Screenplay
- Independent Spirit Award for Best Screenplay
- Academy Award for Best Adapted Screenplay
- AACTA International Award for Best Screenplay
- Writers Guild of America Award for Best Adapted Screenplay
