= Chicago Film Critics Association Awards 2017 =

Annual US film awards ceremony

30th Chicago Film Critics Association Awards
- Date: December 12, 2017
- Site: Chicago, Illinois, U.S.

Highlights
- Best Film: Lady Bird
- Most awards: Lady Bird (4)
- Most nominations: Call Me by Your Name (8)

The 30th Chicago Film Critics Association Awards were announced on December 12, 2017. The awards honor the best in film for 2017. The nominations were announced on December 10. Call Me by Your Name received the most nominations (8), followed by The Shape of Water (7), Dunkirk (6), Lady Bird (6) and Phantom Thread (6).

== Winners and nominees ==
The winners and nominees for the 30th Chicago Film Critics Association Awards are as follows:

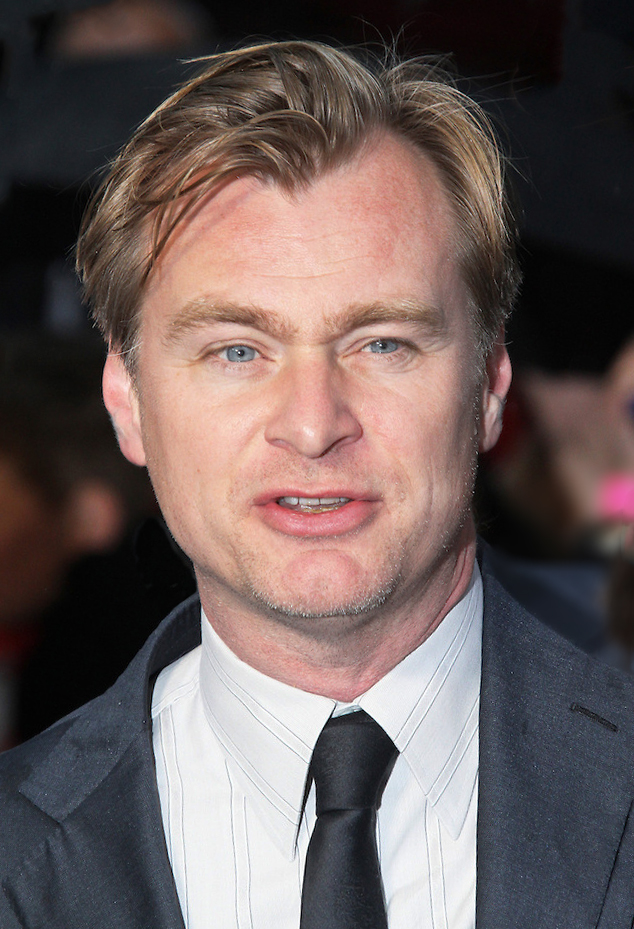
Christopher Nolan, Best Director winner

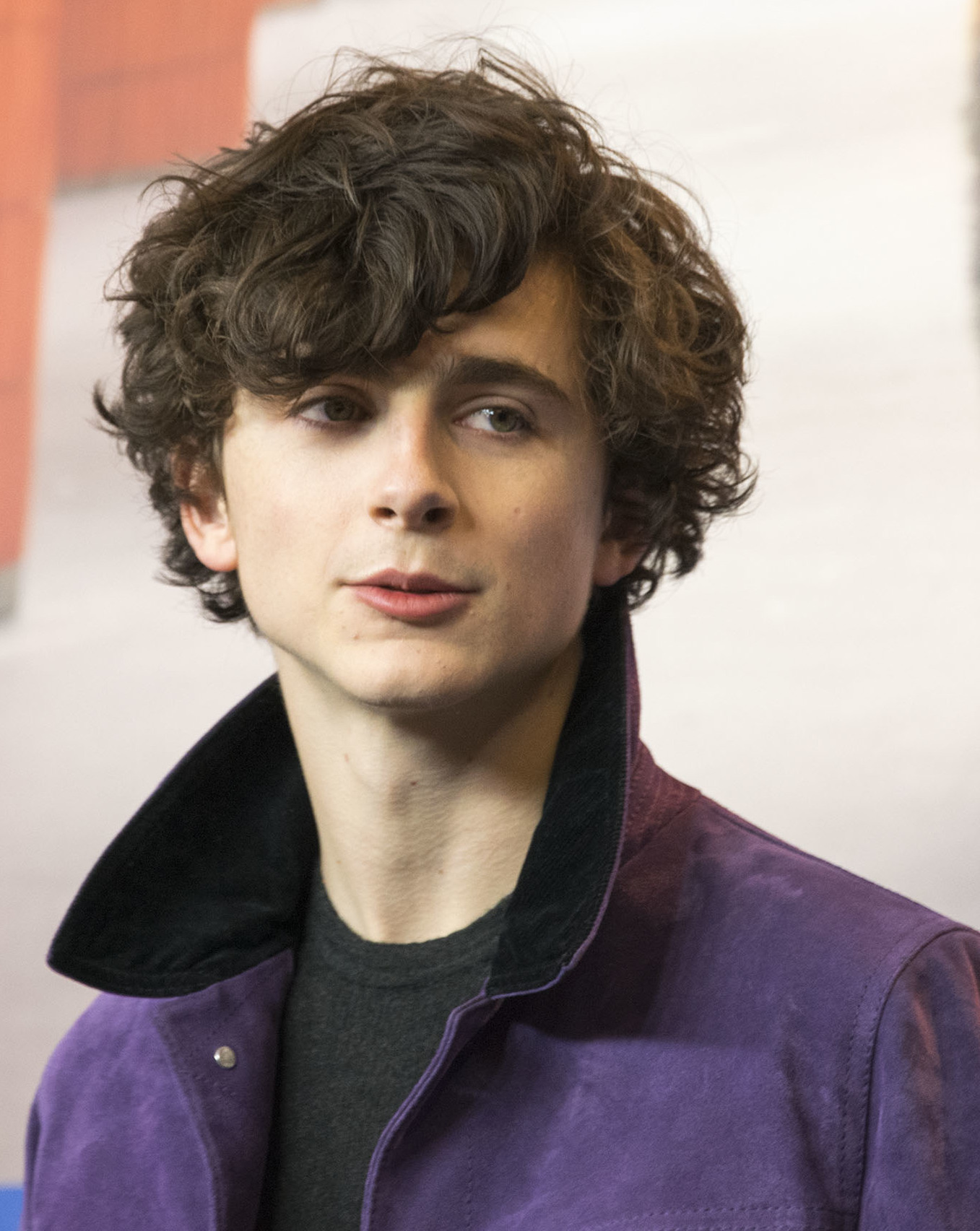
Timothee Chalamet, Best Actor winner

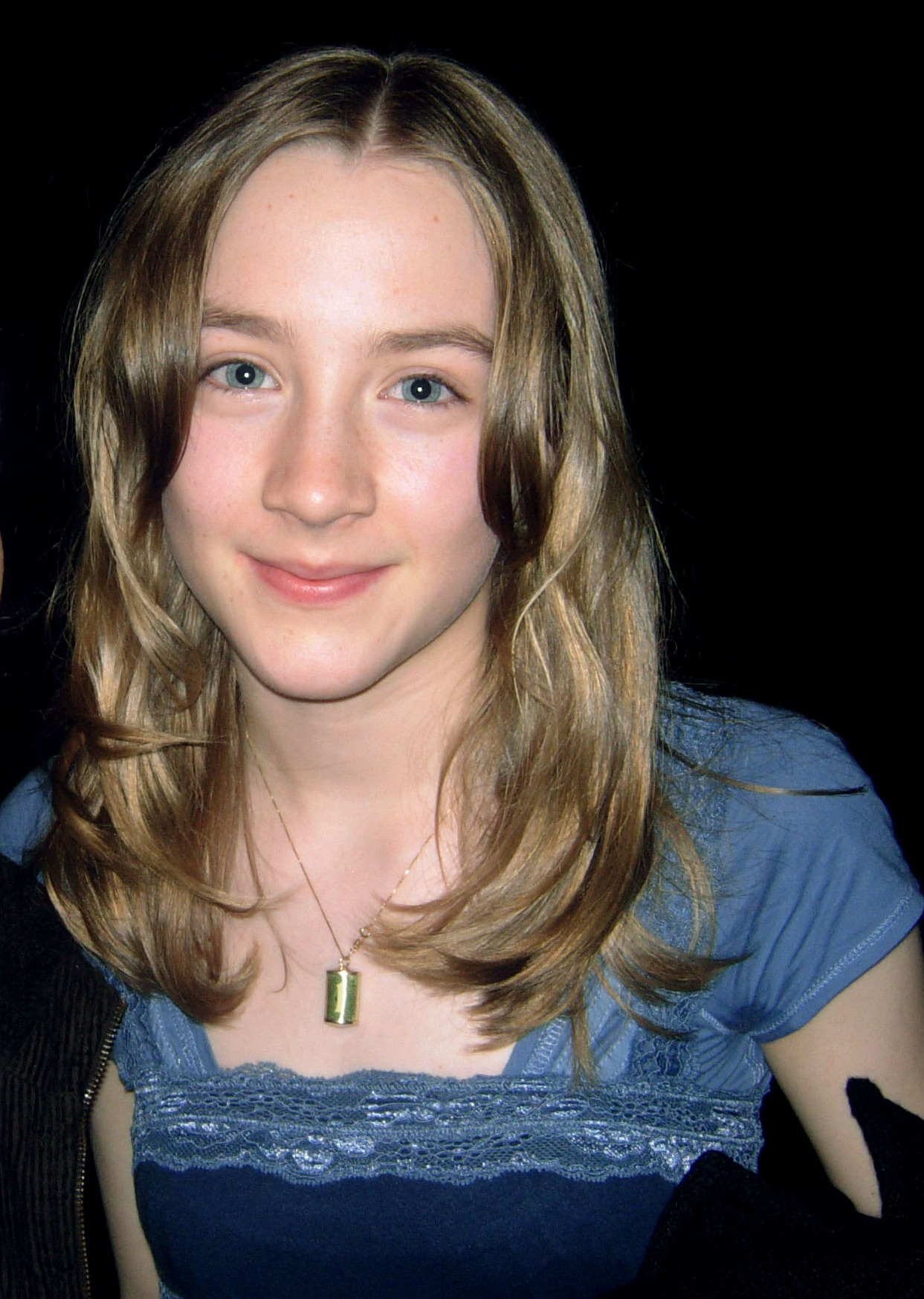
Saoirse Ronan, Best Actress winner

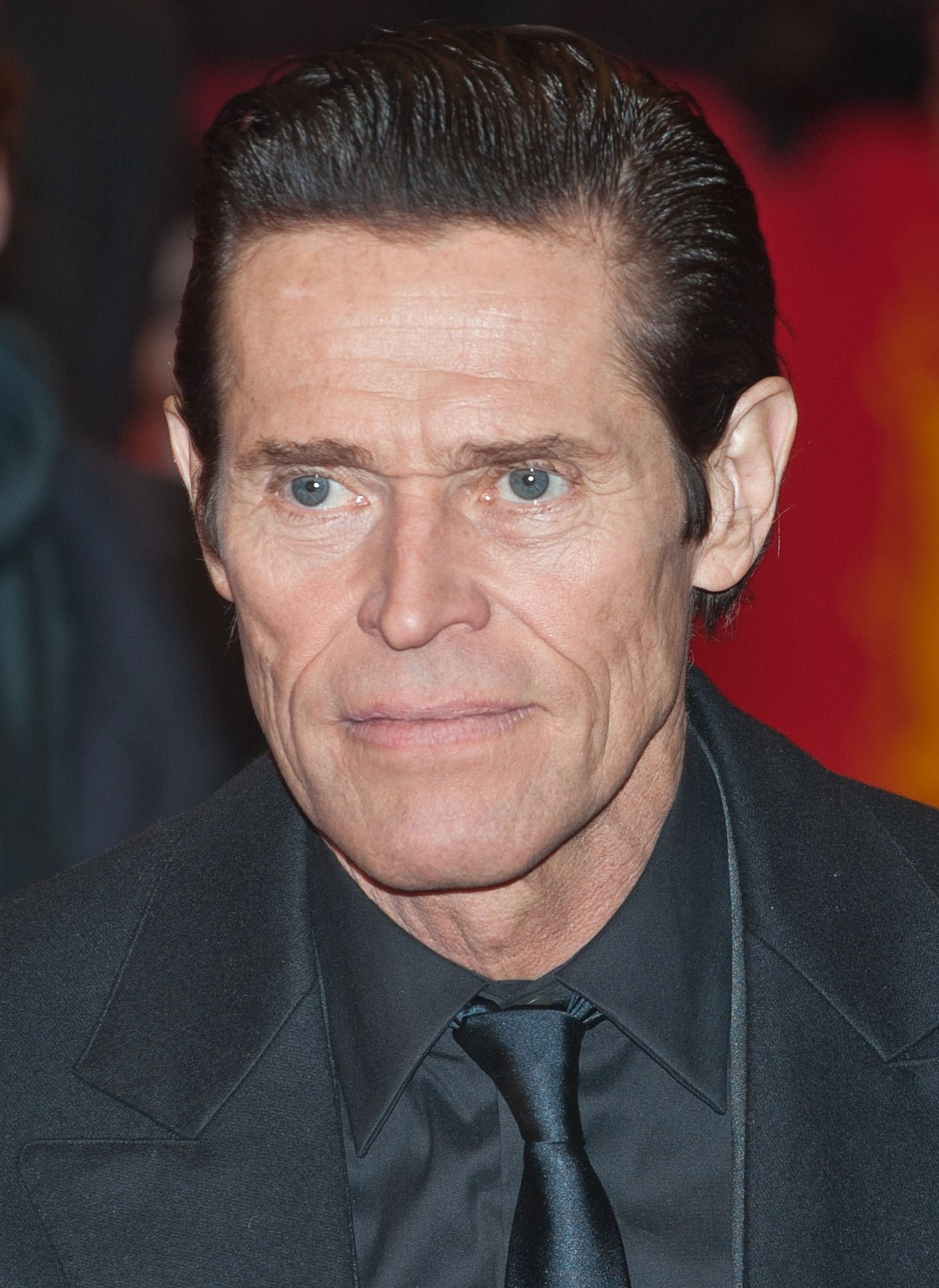
Willem Dafoe, Best Supporting Actor winner

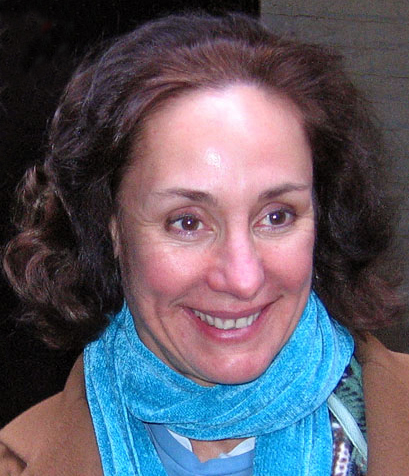
Laurie Metcalf, Best Supporting Actress winner

=== Awards ===
Best Film	Best Director
Lady Bird - Scott Rudin, Eli Bush, and Evelyn O'Neill: Call Me by Your Name - Peter Spears, Luca Guadagnino, Emilie Georges and Marco Morabito; Dunkirk - Emma Thomas and Christopher Nolan; The Shape of Water - Guillermo del Toro and J. Miles Dale; Three Billboards Outside Ebbing, Missouri - Graham Broadbent, Pete Czernin and Martin McDonagh	Christopher Nolan – Dunkirk: Guillermo del Toro – The Shape of Water; Greta Gerwig – Lady Bird; Luca Guadagnino – Call Me by Your Name; Jordan Peele – Get Out
Best Actor	Best Actress
Timothée Chalamet – Call Me by Your Name as Elio Perlman: Daniel Day-Lewis – Phantom Thread as Reynolds Woodcock; James Franco – The Disaster Artist as; Gary Oldman – Darkest Hour as Winston Churchill; Harry Dean Stanton – Lucky as Lucky	Saoirse Ronan – Lady Bird as Christine "Lady Bird" McPherson: Sally Hawkins – The Shape of Water as Elisa Esposito; Vicky Krieps – Phantom Thread as Alma Elson; Frances McDormand – Three Billboards Outside Ebbing, Missouri as Mildred Hayes; Margot Robbie – I, Tonya as Tonya Harding
Best Supporting Actor	Best Supporting Actress
Willem Dafoe – The Florida Project as Bobby Hicks: Armie Hammer – Call Me by Your Name as Oliver; Jason Mitchell – Mudbound as Ronsel Jackson; Sam Rockwell – Three Billboards Outside Ebbing, Missouri as Officer Jason Dixon; Michael Stuhlbarg – Call Me by Your Name as Mr. Perlman	Laurie Metcalf – Lady Bird as Marion McPherson: Mary J. Blige – Mudbound as Florence Jackson; Holly Hunter – The Big Sick as Beth Gardner; Allison Janney – I, Tonya as LaVona Golden; Lesley Manville – Phantom Thread as Cyril Woodcock
Best Original Screenplay	Best Adapted Screenplay
Get Out – Jordan Peele: The Big Sick – Emily V. Gordon and Kumail Nanjiani; Lady Bird – Greta Gerwig; Phantom Thread – Paul Thomas Anderson; The Shape of Water –Screenplay by Guillermo del Toro and Vanessa Taylor; Story by Guillermo del Toro; Three Billboards Outside Ebbing, Missouri – Martin McDonagh	Call Me by Your Name – James Ivory based on the novel by Andre Aciman: Blade Runner 2049 – Hampton Fancher and Michael Green; The Disaster Artist – Scott Neustadter and Michael H. Weber based on the book by Greg Sestero and Tom Bissell; Logan – Screenplay by Scott Frank, James Mangold and Michael Green; Story by James Mangold based on characters from X-Men comic books and theatrical motion pictures; Mudbound – Virgil Williams and Dee Rees based on the novel by Hillary Jordan
Best Animated Film	Best Foreign Language Film
Coco - Lee Unkirch and Darla K. Anderson: The Breadwinner - Nora Twomey and Anthony Leo; The Lego Batman Movie - Chris McKay, Dan Lin, Phil Lord, Christopher Miller and Roy Lee; Loving Vincent - Dorta Kobiela, Hugh Welchman and Ivan Mactaggart; Your Name - Makoto Shinkai	The Square (Sweden) in Swedish - Directed by Ruben Ostlund: BPM (Beats per Minute) (France) in French - Directed by Robin Campillo; A Fantastic Woman (Chile) in Spanish - Directed by Sebastian Lelio; Loveless (Russia) in Russian - Directed by Andrey Zvyaginstev; Raw (France) in French - Directed by Julia Ducournau
Best Documentary Film	Best Original Score
Jane - Brett Morgan: Abacus: Small Enough to Jail - Steve James, Mark Mitten and Julie Goldman; Ex Libris: The New York Public Library - Frederick Wiseman; Faces Places - Agnès Varda, JR and Rosalie Varda; Kedi - Ceyda Torun	Phantom Thread – Jonny Greenwood: Blade Runner 2049 – Benjamin Wallfisch and Hans Zimmer; Dunkirk – Hans Zimmer; The Shape of Water – Alexandre Desplat; War for the Planet of the Apes – Michael Giacchino
Best Production Design	Best Editing
Blade Runner 2049 - Production Design: Dennis Gassner; Set Decoration: Alessandra Querzola: Beauty and the Beast - Production Design: Sarah Greenwood; Set Decoration: Katie Spencer; Dunkirk - Production Design: Nathan Crowley; Set Decoration: Gary Fettis; Phantom Thread - Production Design: Mark Tildesley; Set Decoration: Véronique Melery; The Shape of Water - Production Design: Paul Denham Austerberry; Set Decoration: Shane Vieau and Jeff Melvin	Baby Driver – Paul Machliss and Jonathan Amos: Call Me by Your Name – Walter Fasano; Dunkirk – Lee Smith; The Florida Project – Sean Baker; Get Out – Gregory Plotkin
Most Promising Filmmaker	Most Promising Performer
Greta Gerwig – Lady Bird: Julia Ducournau – Raw; Kogonada – Columbus; John Carroll Lynch – Lucky; Jordan Peele – Get Out	Timothée Chalamet – Call Me by Your Name as Elio Perlman: Dafne Keen – Logan as Laura/X-23; Jessie Pinnick – Princess Cyd as Cyd Loughlin; Brooklynn Prince – The Florida Project as Moonee; Florence Pugh – Lady Macbeth as Katherine Lester; Bria Vinaite – The Florida Project as Halley

== Awards breakdown ==
The following films received multiple nominations:

Nominations	Film
8	Call Me by Your Name
7	The Shape of Water
6	Dunkirk
6	Lady Bird
6	Phantom Thread
4	Three Billboards Outside Ebbing, Missouri
4	The Florida Project
3	Get Out
2	The Big Sick
2	I, Tonya
2	The Disaster Artist

The following films received multiple wins:

Wins	Film
4	Lady Bird
3	Call Me by Your Name
