= Chicago Film Critics Association Award for Best Adapted Screenplay =

Annual US film award

The Chicago Film Critics Association Award for Best Adapted Screenplay is one of the annual awards given by the Chicago Film Critics Association.

== Winners ==
=== 2000s ===
Year	Winner	Writer(s)	Source
2006	The Departed	William Monahan	film by Alan Mak Siu-fai and Felix Chong
2006	Little Children	Todd Field and Tom Perrotta	novel by Tom Perrotta
2006	Notes on a Scandal	Patrick Marber	novel by Zoë Heller
2006	A Prairie Home Companion	Garrison Keillor	radio variety show by Garrison Keillor
2006	Thank You for Smoking	Jason Reitman	novel by Christopher Buckley
2007	No Country for Old Men	Joel Coen and Ethan Coen	novel by Cormac McCarthy
2007	Atonement	Christopher Hampton	novel by Ian McEwan
2007	Into the Wild	Sean Penn	book by Jon Krakauer
2007	There Will Be Blood	Paul Thomas Anderson	novel by Upton Sinclair
2007	Zodiac	James Vanderbilt	book by Robert Graysmith
2008	Slumdog Millionaire	Simon Beaufoy	novel by Vikas Swarup
2008	The Curious Case of Benjamin Button	Eric Roth	short story by F. Scott Fitzgerald
2008	The Dark Knight	Jonathan Nolan and Christopher Nolan	comic by Bob Kane
2008	Doubt	John Patrick Shanley	play by John Patrick Shanley
2008	Frost/Nixon	Peter Morgan	play by Peter Morgan
2009	Up in the Air	Jason Reitman and Sheldon Turner	novel by Walter Kirn
2009	An Education	Nick Hornby	memoir by Lynn Barber
2009	In the Loop	Jesse Armstrong, Simon Blackwell, Armando Iannucci, and Tony Roche	
2009	The Informant!	Scott Z. Burns	book by Kurt Eichenwald
2009	Where the Wild Things Are	Spike Jonze and Dave Eggers	book by Maurice Sendak

=== 2010s ===
Year	Winner	Writer(s)	Source
2010	The Social Network	Aaron Sorkin	novel by Ben Mezrich
2010	Rabbit Hole	David Lindsay-Abaire	play by David Lindsay-Abaire
2010	Toy Story 3	Michael Arndt	
2010	True Grit	Joel Coen and Ethan Coen	novel by Charles Portis
2010	Winter's Bone	Debra Granik and Anne Rosellini	novel by Daniel Woodrell
2011	Moneyball	Steven Zaillian and Aaron Sorkin	book by Michael Lewis
2011	The Descendants	Alexander Payne, Nat Faxon, and Jim Rash	novel by Kaui Hart Hemmings
2011	Drive	Hossein Amini	book by James Sallis
2011	Hugo	John Logan	novel by Brian Selznick
2011	Tinker Tailor Soldier Spy	Bridget O'Connor and Peter Straughan	book by John le Carré
2012	Lincoln	Tony Kushner	novel by Doris Kearns Goodwin
2012	Argo	Chris Terrio	novel by Tony Mendez article by Joshuah Bearman
2012	Beasts of the Southern Wild	Lucy Alibar and Benh Zeitlin	novel by Lucy Alibar
2012	The Perks of Being a Wallflower	Stephen Chbosky	book by Stephen Chbosky
2012	Silver Linings Playbook	David O. Russell	novel by Matthew Quick
2013	12 Years a Slave	John Ridley	memoir by Solomon Northup
2013	August: Osage County	Tracy Letts	play by Tracy Letts
2013	Before Midnight	Richard Linklater, Ethan Hawke, and Julie Delpy	characters by Richard Linklater and Kim Krizan
2013	Philomena	Steve Coogan and Jeff Pope	novel by Martin Sixsmith
2013	The Wolf of Wall Street	Terence Winter	memoir by Jordan Belfort
2014	Gone Girl	Gillian Flynn	novel by Gillian Flynn
2014	The Imitation Game	Graham Moore	novel by Andrew Hodges
2014	Inherent Vice	Paul Thomas Anderson	book by Thomas Pynchon
2014	Under the Skin	Walter Campbell	novel by Michel Faber
2014	Wild	Nick Hornby	memoir by Cheryl Strayed
2015	The Big Short	Adam McKay and Charles Randolph	novel by Michael Lewis
2015	Anomalisa	Charlie Kaufman	play by Charlie Kaufman
2015	Brooklyn	Nick Hornby	novel by Colm Tóibín
2015	Room	Emma Donoghue	novel by Emma Donoghue
2015	Steve Jobs	Aaron Sorkin	book by Walter Isaacson
2016	The Handmaiden	Seo-Kyung Chung and Chan-wook Park	novel by Sarah Waters
2016	Arrival	Eric Heisserer	short story by Ted Chiang
2016	Elle	David Birke	novel by Philippe Djian
2016	Love & Friendship	Whit Stillman	novel by Jane Austen
2016	Silence	Jay Cocks and Martin Scorsese	novel by Shūsaku Endō
2017	Call Me by Your Name	James Ivory	novel by André Aciman
2017	Blade Runner 2049	Hampton Fancher and Michael Green	short story by Philip K. Dick
2017	The Disaster Artist	Scott Neustadter & Michael H. Weber	book by Greg Sestero and Tom Bissell
2017	Logan	Scott Frank, James Mangold & Michael Green	character by Roy Thomas, Len Wein and John Romita Sr.
2017	Mudbound	Dee Rees and Virgil Williams	novel by Hillary Jordan
2018	If Beale Street Could Talk	Barry Jenkins	novel by James Baldwin
2018	BlacKkKlansman	Charlie Wachtel, David Rabinowitz and Kevin Willmott & Spike Lee	memoir by Ron Stallworth
2018	Can You Ever Forgive Me?	Nicole Holofcener and Jeff Whitty	memoir by Lee Israel
2018	The Death of Stalin	Armando Iannucci, David Schneider, Ian Martin and Peter Fellows	graphic novel by Fabien Nury and Thierry Robin
2018	A Star Is Born	Bradley Cooper, Will Fetters and Eric Roth	script by William A. Wellman, Robert Carson, Dorothy Parker and Alan Campbell
2019	Little Women	Greta Gerwig	novel by Louisa May Alcott
2019	A Beautiful Day in the Neighborhood	Micah Fitzerman-Blue and Noah Harpster	Can You Say... Hero? by Tom Junod
2019	Hustlers	Lorene Scafaria	The Hustlers at Scores: The Ex-Strippers Who Stole From (Mostly) Rich Men and Gave to, Well, Themselves by Jessica Pressler
2019	The Irishman	Steven Zaillian	I Heard You Paint Houses by Charles Brandt
2019	Jojo Rabbit	Taika Waititi	Caging Skies by Christine Leunens

=== 2020s ===
Year	Winner	Writer(s)	Source
2020	Nomadland	Chloé Zhao	Nomadland: Surviving America in the Twenty-First Century by Jessica Bruder
2020	The Father	Christopher Hampton and Florian Zeller	Le Père by Florian Zeller
2020	First Cow	Jonathan Raymond and Kelly Reichardt	The Half Life by Jonathan Raymond
2020	I'm Thinking of Ending Things	Charlie Kaufman	novel by Iain Reid
2020	One Night in Miami...	Kemp Powers	play by Kemp Powers
2021	The Power of the Dog	Jane Campion	The Power of the Dog by Thomas Savage
2021	Drive My Car	Ryûsuke Hamaguchi, Haruki Murakami and Takamasa Ôe	"Drive My Car" by Haruki Murakami
2021	The Green Knight	David Lowery	Sir Gawain and the Green Knight by Anonymous
2021	The Lost Daughter	Maggie Gyllenhaal	The Lost Daughter by Elena Ferrante
2021	West Side Story	Tony Kushner	West Side Story by Jerome Robbins, Leonard Bernstein, Stephen Sondheim & Arthur Laurents
2022	Women Talking	Sarah Polley	Women Talking by Miriam Toews
2022	After Yang	Kogonada	"Saying Goodbye to Yang" by Alexander Weinstein
2022	Bones and All	David Kajganich	Bones & All by Camille DeAngelis
2022	Glass Onion: A Knives Out Mystery	Rian Johnson	The character Benoit Blanc, from the film Knives Out by Rian Johnson
2022	Guillermo del Toro's Pinocchio	Guillermo del Toro and Patrick McHale	The Adventures of Pinocchio by Carlo Collodi, Illustrations by Gris Grimly
2023	Killers of the Flower Moon	Eric Roth & Martin Scorsese	Killers of the Flower Moon by David Grann
2023	Are You There, God? It's Me, Margaret	Kelly Fremon Craig	Are You There God? It's Me, Margaret. by Judy Blume
2023	Oppenheimer	Christopher Nolan	American Prometheus by Kai Bird & Martin J. Sherwin
2023	Poor Things	Tony McNamara	Poor Things by Alasdair Gray
2023	The Zone of Interest	Jonathan Glazer	The Zone of Interest by Martin Amis
2024	Nickel Boys	RaMell Ross & Joslyn Barnes	The Nickel Boys by Colson Whitehead
2024	The Beast	Bertrand Bonello, Guillaume Bréaud & Benjamin Charbit	The Beast in the Jungle by Henry James
2024	Conclave	Peter Straughan	Conclave by Robert Harris
2024	Nosferatu	Robert Eggers	Nosferatu by F. W. Murnau
2024	Sing Sing	Clint Bentley & Greg Kwedar	Rehabilitation Through the Arts program at the Sing Sing Correctional Facility in New York
