= Alice Brooks =

American director of photography

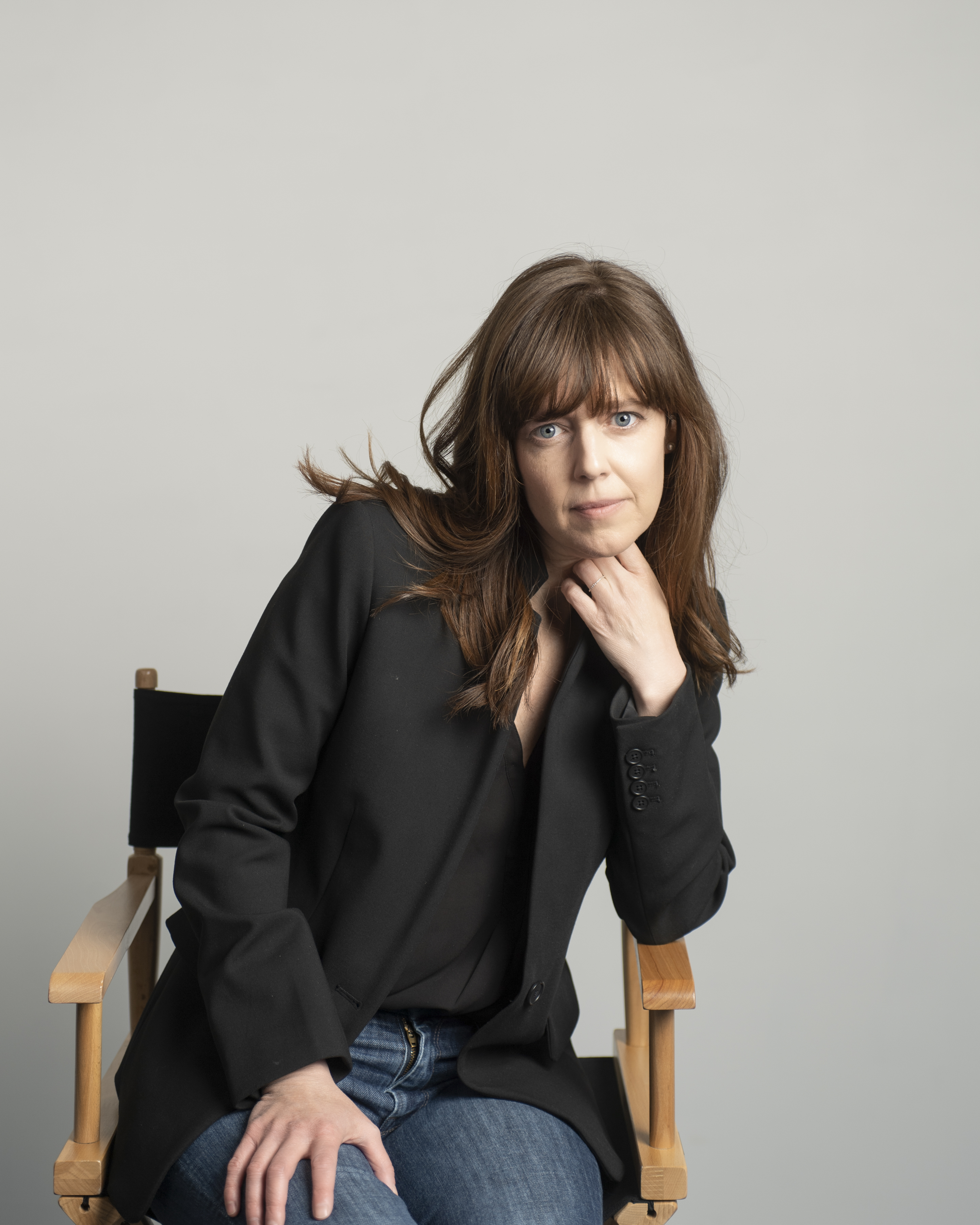
- Education: USC School of Cinematic Arts
- Occupation: Cinematographer
- Years active: 2000–present
- Spouse: Samuel Spencer (m. 2012)
- Website: www.alicebrooks.com

Alice Brooks is an American cinematographer best known for her work on feature films, particularly the film adaptations of the stage musicals Wicked (2024), Tick, Tick ... Boom! (2021), and In the Heights (2021).

== Early life ==
Brooks grew up in Los Angeles and New York, the daughter of Candace Coulston of South Bristol, ME, and Stephen Levi, the late playwright who had numerous plays published by New York publishing company Samuel French. As a child, she acted in various national television commercial spots and was in a recurring skit on Late Night With David Letterman. Brooks graduated USC School of Cinematic Arts magna cum laude in 2001.

== Career ==
Her work includes In the Heights, the film adaptation of Lin-Manuel Miranda's Broadway production directed by Jon M. Chu, which received widespread critical acclaim for its cinematography; and Tick, Tick... Boom!, Miranda's directorial debut starring Andrew Garfield and produced by Ron Howard, based on the stage show by Jonathan Larson.

Brooks collaborates with Chu frequently; prior to In The Heights, the two worked together on The LXD: The Legion of Extraordinary Dancers in 2011, Jem and the Holograms in 2015 and Home Before Dark, Apple TV+'s 2020 crime-drama series. She worked again with Chu on the two-part film adaptation of Stephen Schwartz's Broadway musical Wicked for Universal Pictures. The first part was released in November 2024, with the second part scheduled for release in November 2025.

Her work on The Remix: Hip Hop X Fashion from directors Farah X and Lisa Cortés premiered at the 2019 Tribeca Film Festival and went on to win awards from Martha's Vineyard African American Film Festival, Milwaukee Film Festival, Napa Valley Film Festival and the Sidewalk Film Festival. Her work has been featured on the cover of ICG Magazine Brooks also worked on 2021's Queen Bees, director Michael Lembeck's comedy-drama starring Ellen Burstyn, Jane Curtin, Loretta Devine, and James Caan.

== Accolades ==
In 2004, Brooks was nominated and awarded WorldFest-Houston's Independent Short Subject-Films & Video - Cinematography - Shorts Platinum Award for her work on Charlie 2.0, Matthew Hsu's comedy short. In 2024, she and gaffer Dave Smith became the first recipients of the SUMOLIGHT Creative Synergy Award at the 2024 Manaki Brothers Film Festival for their work on Wicked.

== Personal life ==
She has been married to Samuel Spencer since September 8, 2012.

== Filmography ==
=== Film ===
Feature film

Year	Title	Director	Notes
2006	Monday	Heidi Van Lier	
2006	Ten 'til Noon	Scott Storm	
2006	You Did What?	Jeff Morris	
2006	Grand Junction	Freddy F. Hakimi	
2007	A Light for Greytowers	Robin Saex Garbose	
2008	Mulligans	Chip Hale	
2009	Hungry Years	Eva James; Isaak James	
2010	American Flyer	Mark L. Christensen	
2011	Lucid Possession	Toni Dove	
2015	Sweethearts of the Gridiron	Chip Hale	
2015	Apparition	Quinn Saunders	
2015	Jem and the Holograms	Jon M. Chu	
2016	Dance Camp	Bert and Bertie	
2016	Girl Flu.	Dorie Barton	
2016	North by El Norte	Mark L. Christensen	
2016	One Fall	Marcus Dean Fuller	
2016	We Love You	Huck Botko	
2018	Alex & Me	Eric Champnella	
2018	Emma	Tim Kashani; Kent Nicholson	
2021	In the Heights	Jon M. Chu	
2021	Queen Bees	Michael Lembeck	
2021	Tick, Tick... Boom!	Lin-Manuel Miranda	Nominated - Satellite Award for Best Cinematography
2024	Wicked	Jon M. Chu	Shot back-to-back
2025	Wicked: For Good	Jon M. Chu	Shot back-to-back
2027	Spider-Man: Beyond the Spider-Verse	Bob Persichetti; Justin K. Thompson	Animated film

Direct-to-video

Year	Title	Director
2004	The Hillz	Saran Barnun
2006	Bit Parts	Dave Reda

Documentary film

Year	Title	Director	Notes
2010	Design Revolution	Sally Levi	
2019	The Remix: Hip Hop X Fashion	Farah X Lisa Cortés	With Nausheen Dadabhoy and Jendra Jarnagin

=== Television ===
Year	Title	Director	Notes
2010	Wainy Days	David Wain	Episode "Donna"
2010–2011	The Legion of Extraordinary Dancers	Jon M. Chu; Scott Speer; Ryan Landels; Charles Oliver; Christopher Scott	21 episodes
2012	S2udio City	Christopher Scott; Herself; Jamal Sims	15 episodes
2013	Tainted Love	Avi Youabian	All 6 episodes
2015	The Kennedy Files		4 episodes
2017	Tom Clancy's Ghost Recon Wildlands: War Within the Cartel	Avi Youabian	TV short
2017	The Walking Dead: Red Machete	Avi Youabian	6 episodes
2020	Home Before Dark	Jon M. Chu; Kat Candler	4 episodes
