= Virgil Williams =

American television writer

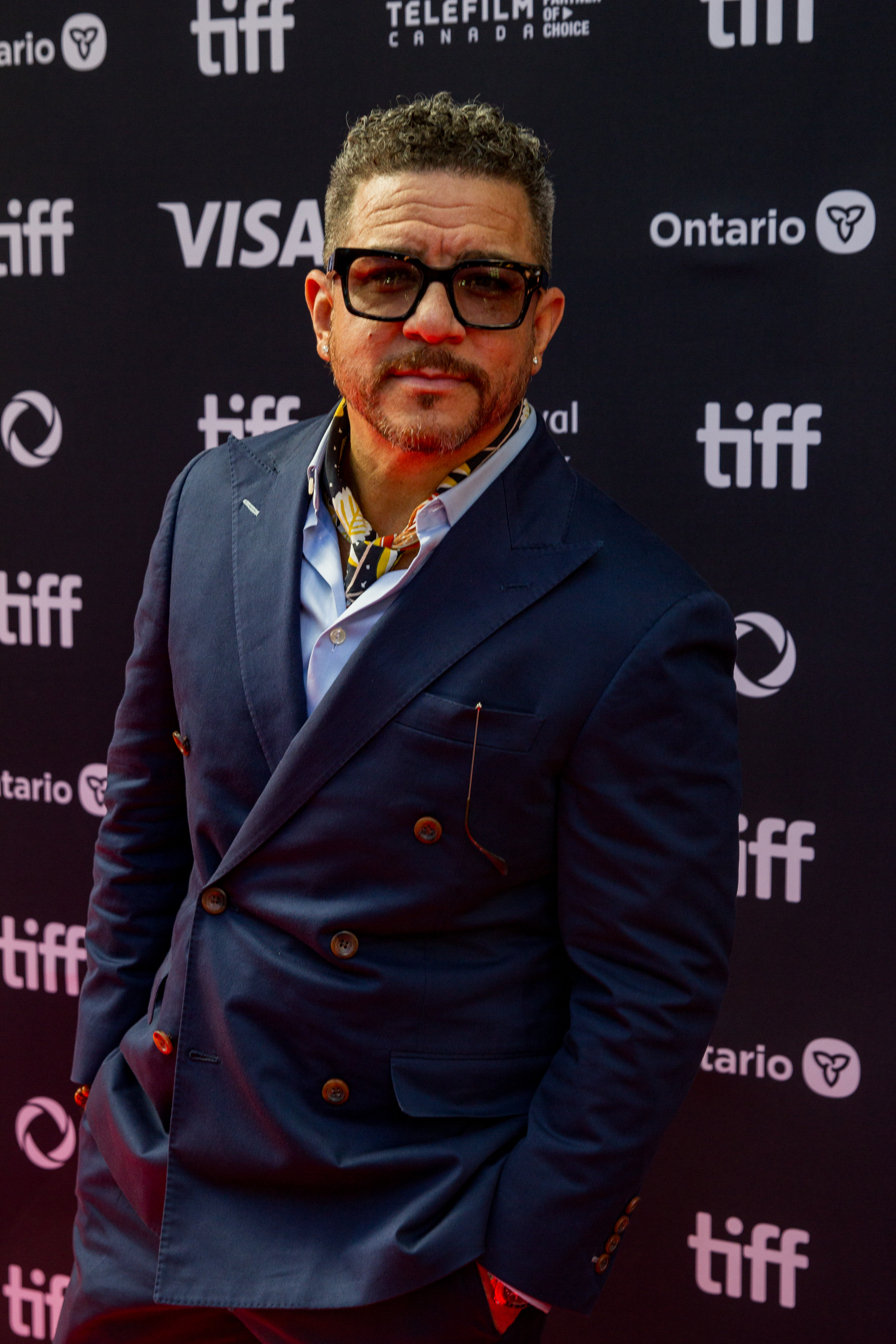
Virgil Williams at the 2024 Toronto International Film Festival

Virgil Williams is an American screenwriter. He has written for television shows like 24 and ER, as well as films such as The Piano Lesson and Mudbound, for which he and director Dee Rees received a Best Adapted Screenplay nomination.

== Career ==
Williams began working in television as a writer for 24, for which he wrote a single episode during the first season in 2002. He was then hired as a story editor for the show's second season and reprised his role as a writer for the third season, contributing one more episode. In total, he scripted four episodes of the show.

Later, in 2005, Williams became a co-producer and writer for ER during its twelfth season. He wrote two episodes for the twelfth season, "Two Ships" and "Strange Bedfellows". Williams was then promoted to producer and writer for the thirteenth season and wrote two more episodes, "Jigsaw" and "From Here to Paternity". For the fourteenth season, he was promoted to supervising producer, during which he wrote three episodes: "Gravity", "Believe the Unseen", and "Tandem Repeats". He remained a supervising producer for the fifteenth and final season and wrote two more episodes entitled "Oh, Brother" and "Separation Anxiety".

In 2011, Williams joined the writer staff of Criminal Minds, for which he wrote ten episodes and worked as a co-executive producer. In 2016, actor Thomas Gibson allegedly kicked Williams in the shin during the production of an episode in which Gibson was directing, leading to Gibson's removal from the production.

In 2017, Williams signed a deal with Universal Television. After co-writing the film Mudbound—adapted from the novel of the same name by Hillary Jordan—with director Dee Rees, the two received a nomination for the Academy Award for Best Adapted Screenplay in 2017.

In 2024, Williams co-wrote the Netflix film The Piano Lesson with its debut director, Malcolm Washington.

Williams credits Denzel Washington with providing him significant mentorship and encouragement during their work on a television show that never left development and the 2021 film A Journal for Jordan.

== Filmography ==
=== Films ===
Year	Title	Role	Notes	Ref
2017	Mudbound	Co-screenwriter	Nominated for Academy Award for Best Adapted Screenplay	
2021	A Journal for Jordan	Co-screenwriter		
2024	The Piano Lesson	Co-screenwriter		
