= Little Richard: I Am Everything =

2023 documentary American film

- Theatrical release poster
- Directed by: Lisa Cortés
- Produced by: Lisa Cortés; Robert Friedman; Liz Yale Marsh; Caryn Capotosto; Mike Powers; Gus Wenner; Jason Fine
- Starring: Little Richard
- Cinematography: Keith Walker; Graham Willoughby
- Edited by: Nyneve Minnear; Jake Hostetter
- Music by: Tamar-kali
- Production companies: CNN Films; HBO Max; Rolling Stone Films; Bungalow Media + Entertainment
- Distributed by: Magnolia Pictures
- Release dates: January 19, 2023 (Sundance); April 21, 2023 (United States)
- Running time: 98 minutes
- Country: United States
- Language: English
- Box office: $178,548

Little Richard: I Am Everything is a 2023 American documentary film, directed and produced by Lisa Cortés. It follows the life and career of musician Little Richard.

It had its world premiere at the 2023 Sundance Film Festival on January 19, 2023, and was released on April 21, 2023, by Magnolia Pictures.

== Plot ==
Documentary that follows the life and career of musician Little Richard.

== Production ==
In December 2020, it was announced Cortés would direct and produce a documentary revolving around Little Richard, with Rolling Stone Films set to produce, and Dee Rees executive producing. In May 2022, it was announced CNN Films and HBO Max would co-produce the film.

== Release ==
The film had its world premiere at the 2023 Sundance Film Festival on January 19, 2023. Shortly after, Magnolia Pictures acquired distribution rights to the film. It also screened at South by Southwest on March 13, 2023 and at the Douglass Theater in Macon, Georgia on April 14, 2023. It was released on April 21, 2023. It premiered on September 4, 2023, on CNN.

== Reception ==
On the review aggregator website Rotten Tomatoes, 96% of 48 critics' reviews are positive, with an average rating of 7.8/10. The website's consensus reads: "Woooo! An engaging tribute to the rock pioneer, Little Richard: I Am Everything should shut up anyone who doubts the title's veracity." Metacritic, which uses a weighted average, assigned a score of 79 out of 100 based on five critics, indicating "generally favorable" reviews.

Little Richard: I Am Everything was a nominee for a 2023 Peabody Award.

== Music ==
The documentary features original music by Tamar-kali, Valerie June, and Cory Henry. On June 16, 2023, the soundtrack was released on Varèse Sarabande and distributed by Concord. Jonathan Finegold served as the music supervisor of the film, and he also co-produced the original soundtrack alongside Andy Fisher.
