= The Remix: Hip Hop X Fashion =

2019 American documentary film

- Film poster
- Directed by: Farah X; Lisa Cortés
- Written by: Lisa Cortés; Farah X Emil Wilbekin; Andrew Mer
- Produced by: Lisa Cortés; Hillary Cutter; Andrew Mer
- Cinematography: Alice Brooks nausheen dadabhoy Jendra Jarnagin
- Edited by: Farah X Sarah Laties; R.A. Fedde
- Music by: Wendell Hanes
- Release date: May 2, 2019
- Running time: 67 minutes
- Country: United States
- Language: English

The Remix: Hip Hop X Fashion, is a 2019 American documentary film directed by Farah X and Lisa Cortés. The film premiered at the 2019 Tribeca Film Festival. It also screened at the University of Wisconsin–Milwaukee, New Orleans Film Festival and Woodstock Film Festival. It was released by Netflix on 22 July 2020.

== Premise ==
The film spotlights fashion architect, stylist and MCM Global Creative Partner, Misa Hylton, one of the first notable stylists to mix streetwear with fashion. The film showcases Hylton's most recognized fashion looks with her muses including Lil’ Kim, Mary J. Blige and Missy Elliott.

April Walker, iconic streetwear designer, entrepreneur and founder of the Brooklyn born label, Walker Wear, is also chronicled for her contributions in changing the game. Walker, the first woman to dominate urban menswear—secured early endorsements by Hip Hop's elite—Tupac, The Notorious B.I.G. and others.

The documentary showcases the global cultural impact of Hip Hop and its influences on shaping the fashion industry of today. It celebrates the female designers and stylists who were working behind the scenes—and how their iconic styles and trends changed fashion in music—forever.

== Accolades ==
Year	Award	Category	Recipient	Result	Ref.
2019	Black Reel Awards	Outstanding Independent Documentary	Farah X Lisa Cortés	Nominated	
2019	Sidewalk Film Festival	Best Black Lens Film	Farah X Lisa Cortés	Won	
2019	Milwaukee Film Festival	Best Documentary Feature	Farah X Lisa Cortés	Won	
2019	Napa Valley Film Festival	Best Documentary Feature	Farah X Lisa Cortés	Won	
2019	Urbanworld Film Festival	Best Documentary Feature	Farah X Lisa Cortés	Won	
