= Ouigi Theodore =

American fashion designer

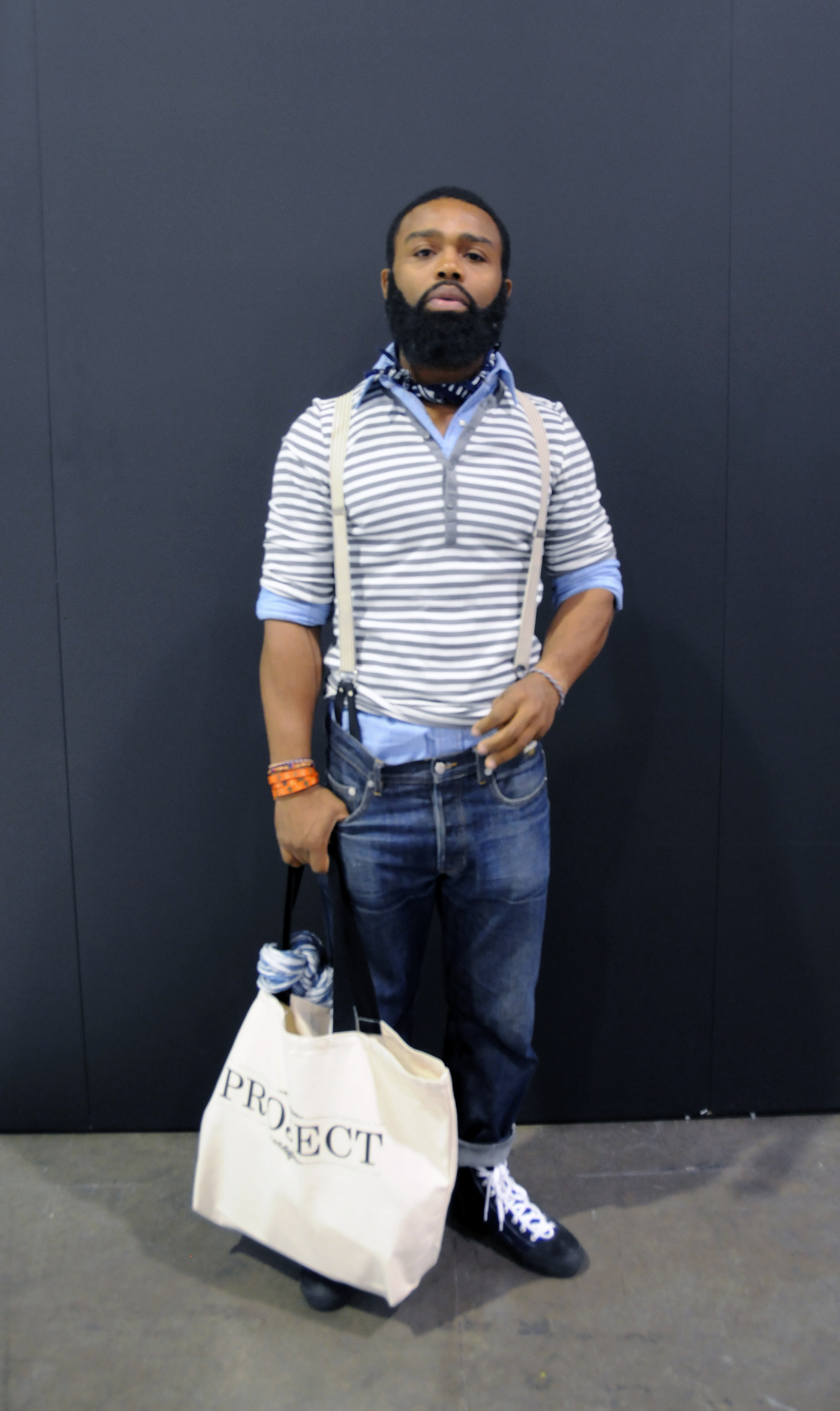
Ouigi Theodore in 2008

Ouigi Theodore (born 1975 or 1976) is an American fashion designer and stylist known particularly for his menswear label Brooklyn Circus. During the late 2000s and early 2010s he was also known as "The Bearded Man" due to his distinctive facial hair.

== Early life ==
Quincy Ouigi Theodore was born in Port-au-Prince, Haiti in 1975 or 1976. When he was eight years old, his family moved to Crown Heights, Brooklyn. Theodore was brought up by his aunt and his grandmother following the death in 1990 of his mother when he was 15. His aunt traveled often, and Theodore followed her example: he traveled through Europe and Asia.

Theodore went to Brooklyn Technical High School, where he dropped his first name to avoid comparisons to Quincy Jones. He graduated with a History degree from Stony Brook University and went on to study graphic design at the Fashion Institute of Technology, working as a graphic designer and club promoter before deciding to launch his fashion business, Brooklyn Circus. He had already tried launching an earlier label, called Race, in 2003, but this was not successful.

== Career ==
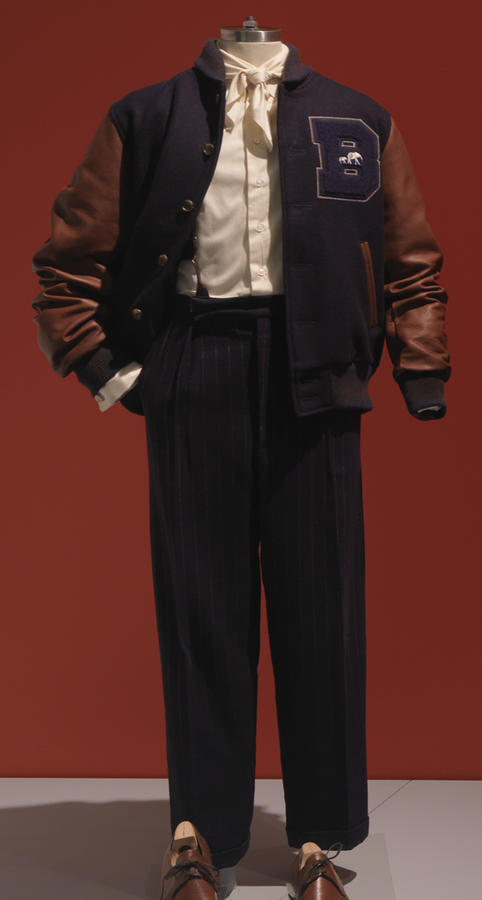
2008 Brooklyn Circus ensemble worn by the designer, Ouigi Theodore

The first Brooklyn Circus opened in Boerum Hill in 2006, selling Theodore's designs under the BKc label, and has been described as a "house-of-prep' for the inner city," in contrast to other streetwear brands active at the time. By choosing the word "circus", the intention was to suggest a disciplined traveling community that welcomed outsiders and those living on the edge of mainstream society, rather than catering only to those who fitted in with gangsta and drill rap influenced style such as baggy jeans and hip-hop sneakers. In a 2011 feature on Brooklyn Circus and its designer, Theodore told The New York Times that when he went overseas, people would see how he dressed, and tell him that he wasn't "urban" because he didn't look like he listened to hip-hop. He also described how others had called his work dandy, Anglophile, foppish and even steampunk, although Theodore considers his work "retro-urban." By then, he had redefined himself as an "idea generator" rather than a designer, employing others to design under his supervision and to manage production and wholesaling.

By 2011, Brooklyn Circus had a second shop in San Francisco, and had outlets in Chicago and Stockholm, as well as being retailed by 25 shops in Japan. Theodore has been recognised as a trend forecaster: he has been consulted by companies such as Hennessy, Toyota and G-Shock and he spoke at the PSFK conference in New York in 2010. Durand Guion, the vice president of fashion for Macy's told Women's Wear Daily in 2021 that Brooklyn Circus had a strong aesthetic referencing vintage military styles and "true Americana", and that Theodore was an "amazing storyteller".

In 2021 Theodore collaborated with Macy's on a capsule clothing collection titled Sun + Stone. The collection was part of the 'Icons of Style' campaign, designed to feature Black American fashion and style-makers, where Theodore and four other Black designers (Zerina Akers, Misa Hylton, Allen Onyia, and Aminah Abdul Kihad) had their work manufactured and retailed by Macy's. The Sun + Stone collection is designed in honor of Theodore's family, especially his mother, with military influences and the numbers 1945 and 45 prominently featured (his mother's birth year and the age she was when she died).

=== The Bearded Man ===
In the 2000s, Theodore grew a distinctive horizontal beard, resembling the horn of an anvil, which became his trademark and led to his alter ego, "The Bearded Man". He used this title as his handle when posting to his style blog, and was credited under it in print adverts for Bushmills, Citizens Bank, and a Tide television advertisement. In 2011, Theodore told the New York Times that he was recognised in the street as "The Bearded Man". The Fall 2011 issue of Antenna had a fashion spread in which Theodore modelled as "The Bearded Man". Also in 2011, GQ ran an article about Brooklyn Circus which referred to Theodore as "The Bearded Man himself." In Hue, the alumni magazine for Fashion Institute for Technology graduates, Theodore was described as "The Bearded Man" in one sub-header to an article about his success.
