= Misa Hylton =

American stylist and fashion designer (born 1973)

- Born: January 6, 1974 (age 52); Mount Vernon, New York, U.S.
- Other name: Misa Hylton-Brim
- Occupations: Fashion stylist, designer
- Years active: 1992–present
- Children: 3, including Justin Combs

Misa Hylton (previously Hylton-Brim; born January 6, 1974) is an American stylist and fashion designer who was a stylist for many hip-hop and R&B acts, including Lil' Kim and Mary J. Blige. Hylton's style, known as "hip-hop glamorous", has been credited with influencing fashion trends. Hylton is a global creative partner for MCM and was the centerpiece of the 2019 documentary The Remix: Hip Hop x Fashion.

== Early life ==
Hylton was raised in Mount Vernon, New York, by a mother of Japanese and Jamaican heritage and an African American father. She enjoyed fashion from an early age and was also a hip-hop fan. Hylton listened to hip-hop radio stations and envisioned what the artists might be wearing. Her future boyfriend, Sean "Puffy" Combs, also grew up in Mount Vernon and lived close to one of Hylton's childhood friends.

== Career beginnings ==
Hylton began working in fashion when she was a 17-year-old high school student, when she assisted on a Jodeci music video. Her then-boyfriend and A&R intern, Sean "Diddy" Combs, invited her to the set, and together they convinced Uptown Records founder Andre Harrell to let the group members wear combat boots, hoodies, and backward hats. Combs later introduced her to other artists at Uptown Records, who became some of her first clients.

Hylton most notably dressed Lil' Kim and Mary J. Blige, whom she considered her muses. She began to design clothes due to the difficulty she experienced finding clothes for Lil' Kim, who was 4'11" and wore size 4.5 shoes. Hylton designed and styled the purple jumpsuit and pasty Lil' Kim wore to the 1999 VMAs. She has said she focused on innovation and risk-taking in her early styles, and connected that pattern to being a member of the "hip hop generation". Hylton was inspired by The Wiz for the fashion in Lil' Kim's "Crush on You" video. She also styled Lil' Kim for her solo debut album, Hard Core.

When she was 21, Hylton founded Chyna Doll Enterprises and provided stylists for video shoots, magazine covers, and public appearances. Chyna Doll Enterprises styled artists such as Aaliyah, Faith Evans, Jodeci, Q-Tip, Foxy Brown, and Dru Hill. By age 25, Hylton had made $1 million as a stylist. She has styled Combs, Missy Elliott, 50 Cent, La La Anthony, Mase, Terrence Howard, and Mary J. Blige in the "Not Gon' Cry" video.

Hylton has spoken about the issues she faced as a young woman of color in the fashion world. The fashion her clients wore was known as "ghetto fabulous", which Hylton called "hip hop glam" and was not accepted by the mainstream fashion world. She bought her clients luxury fashion with her own credit card.

When Lil' Kim gained credibility after a MAC campaign, Hylton's clients began to be courted by fashion houses such as Galliano. In a Billboard interview, Hylton said that one of her favorite brands to borrow clothing from was Versace, in part because it featured Naomi Campbell as a model when dark-skinned models were rarely walked by major fashion houses.

Hylton frequently collaborates with Dapper Dan. Together they created custom shorts for rapper Trina fabricated from 20-dollar bills, and styled the Fendi Zucca print suits for the "Let's Get It" music video.

== Contemporary work ==
In 2012, she opened Misa Hylton Fashion Academy with co-founder and stylist Jai Hudson.

Hylton starred in the documentary The Remix: Hip Hop x Fashion, about fashion's role in hip-hop. The film premiered at the 2019 Tribeca Film Festival.

In February 2020, Harlem's Fashion Row honored Hylton, April Walker, and Dapper Dan for their contributions to the fashion industry.

Hylton is a global creative partner for MCM. In 2018, she designed the fashion in the "Apeshit" video by Beyonce and Jay-Z. She designed custom MCM chaps and a western hat for Megan Thee Stallion's July 2019 Jimmy Kimmel Live! performance. Hylton also styled and provided fashion direction for Paper's November 2020 Flo Milli editorial shoot, which included a custom denim bustier, panty, pasties, and headwrap. In 2021, Hylton launched her INC fashion collection for Macy's as part of its "Icons of Style" campaign to promote and showcase Black American style-makers and designers, including Ouigi Theodore and Zerina Akers.

== Impact ==
Hylton frequently dressed clients in Western-inspired attire in the '90s, such as in Mary J. Blige's "All That I Can Say" music video. The trend inspired the "Yeehaw" style of 2019.

She is credited with shaping the way women rappers dressed in the '90s, and those styles are thought to influence women artists today. While women emcees of the '80s wore more masculine fashion, Hylton "encouraged girls in the game to celebrate their sexuality through fashion." Celebrities such as Rihanna have referenced Lil' Kim, one of Hylton's clients, as inspirations for their fashion sense. Cardi B's gold-chained headdress in the video "Money" and matching red fur and bob wig in "Backin it Up" have been traced to Hylton's selections for Lil' Kim.

Hylton encouraged her first professional styling clients, Jodeci, to wear modern, casual clothing, including hoodies and backward hats, instead of formal clothes and hard-bottom shoes. The look influenced R&B fashion and is said to remain a point of reference for contemporary artists.

== Personal life ==
Hylton has three children: Justin Dior (b. 1993) from her relationship with hip-hop entrepreneur Sean Combs, and Niko (b. 1997) and Madison (b. 1998) from her marriage to music executive Jojo Brim.

== Legal issues ==
On April 29, 2025, Hylton filed a $5 million lawsuit against Mary J. Blige for breach of contract and interferences involving a business deal with rapper Vado. Hylton claims she launched a management company in February 2023 to represent Vado, who later signed a contract with Blige's imprint, Beautiful Life Productions, and that Blige later coerced Vado to terminate his management contract with Hylton's company.
