= When She Woke =

Book by Hillary Jordan

- First edition
- Author: Hillary Jordan
- Language: English
- Genre: Science fiction
- Publisher: Algonquin Books (US); HarperCollins (UK/Canada)
- Publication date: October 2011
- Publication place: United States
- Media type: Print
- Pages: 344
- ISBN: 978-1-56512-629-9

When She Woke is a science fiction novel by American author Hillary Jordan, published in October 2011. It has been translated into French, Spanish, Turkish, German, Portuguese and Chinese. The novel is a dystopian reimagining of Nathaniel Hawthorne's The Scarlet Letter, set in a future theocratic America where rather than being imprisoned and rehabilitated, criminals are punished by being "chromed" – having their skin color genetically altered to fit their crime – and released into the general population to survive as best they can.

== Plot ==
In an unspecified future 26-year-old Hannah Payne awakes in a prison cell having been chromed (i.e. having her skin altered) red for murder. Hannah lives in Texas after a great outbreak of a sexually transmitted infection caused the majority of women of the world to become sterile leading to widespread panic, the rise of Christianity, and the overturning of Roe v. Wade. Hannah belonged to a mega-church and after her father was the victim of a terror attack which threatened to leave him partially blind her family was offered comfort by the reverend Aidan Dale. Hannah and the reverend began an affair leading to Hannah's pregnancy. Unwilling to shame the married Dale, Hannah had an illegal abortion and was picked up immediately afterwards and convicted of the murder of her fetus. Because she refused to name her abortion care provider or Aidan, Hannah was sentenced to 16 years as a chrome, which also meant that she would be unable to bear children during that time because of an implant.

Hannah spends the first month of her sentence in isolation in prison where a live-feed broadcasts her image around the world. After her release her father manages to secure her a six-month stint at a half-way house called the Straight Path Centre. While there Hannah is forced to live in austerity and create a doll to represent her aborted fetus which she is supposed to treat like a child. There Hannah meets Kayla, a young woman who was chromed after shooting her step-father in the stomach for molesting her sister. A month into Hannah's residency Kayla decides to leave the centre to find her boyfriend. Though Kayla invited Hannah to come with her Hannah stays on an extra day, finally leaving after witnessing one of the Path councillors destroying the doll of a woman who is to be released causing her emotional distress.

Outside Hannah visits her sister but is kicked out by her brother-in-law, whom her sister warns her has become increasingly violent after joining the vigilante terror cell known as the "Fist" who beat and kill chromes. Hannah is then able to contact Kayla through a tracker that all chromes are forced to wear. They decide to leave Texas and go stay with Kayla's cousin, but on the road they are abducted by Simone and Paul, two people who turn out to have been saving them from Fist members intending to harm them. Hannah eventually realizes that their saviours are members of the Novemberists, a group of feminists who are pro-choice. The group did not intend to save Kayla and are reluctant to help her as her crime was not related to abortion, but they reluctantly help her at Hannah's insistence.

The goal of the Novemberists is to take Hannah and Kayla to Canada where abortion is legal and the chrome procedure can be reversed without harming them. However, on their first stop along the way to Canada the women are betrayed by their host, Stanton, whose mother was an abortion provider and who sells them to be used as prostitutes in order to pay for expensive renovations for his home. Hannah is rescued by Simone while Paul goes on a mission to save Kayla.

Hannah initiates sex with Simone and considers the possibility that she may be bisexual. She also asks Simone to give her the tools she needs to make it to Canada without having to depend on anyone again. Simone reluctantly agrees and gives her a van and a gun with which to make the trip. Despite promising Simone to head straight to the border, Hannah instead makes contact with Aidan and makes plans to meet with him at a cabin he owns.

Reunited Hannah and Aidan sleep together a final time. Aidan wants to confess to his wife and to the public about his affair but Hannah tells him not to, warning that they can never be together as his level of fame will attract attention leading to her and cause attention to the Novemberists putting them in danger. Aidan realizes that Hannah is right and the two part.

Hannah resumes her journey to go north to Canada. On the way there she sees a news report that Aidan publicly confessed to adultery without naming the woman he had an affair with and then collapsed of a heart attack. Hannah continues on and crosses the U.S. border into Québec, learning upon her arrival that Kayla is also safe.

== Recognition ==
It was long-listed for the 2013 International Dublin Literary Award and a finalist in the 2012 Lambda Literary Awards. It was a Booklist Editor's Choice for Best Fiction of 2011, one of BookPage's Best Books of 2011, one of Publishers Weekly's Top Ten Literary Fiction picks for the fall and the #1 Indie Next pick for October 2011.

== Reception ==
Reviews were mixed :

- Kathryn Savage writing in the Star Tribune concludes "An inventive tale about a new America that has lost its way—whose values echo fundamentalism – 'When She Woke' is, at its heart, a tense, energetic and lively paced story about self-discovery and reclamation in the wake of enormous shame. It is a story about the price of love."
- The New York Times was generally positive: "Jordan’s feverishly conceived dystopia holds its own alongside the dark inventions of Margaret Atwood and Ray Bradbury, but the novel’s cunning futuristic trappings can’t quite disguise its weather-beaten theme: a repressed young woman’s liberation from co-dependency and bankrupt self-esteem. The plot’s melodramatic turns are fed, and ultimately redeemed, by an unalloyed rage at the perceived trajectory of social freedoms in 21st-century America. If 'When She Woke' sometimes seems like a stunt, it’s a stunt with very sharp teeth."
- Carolyn See in The Washington Post is more negative: "The advertising for this novel recommends it to reading groups because women will want to discuss its big issues. I think they might end up screaming at each other instead. Ninety percent of the men here are cowards or brutes or would-be rapists; at least 50 percent of the Christians are full-on certifiable. 'When She Woke' seems to me to be primarily agitprop: ham-handed, disrespectful and quite dumb in places where it should be smart."

== See also ==
- Feminist science fiction
- Pregnancy in science fiction
