= Farah X =

American director, film editor

Farah Zeb Khalid
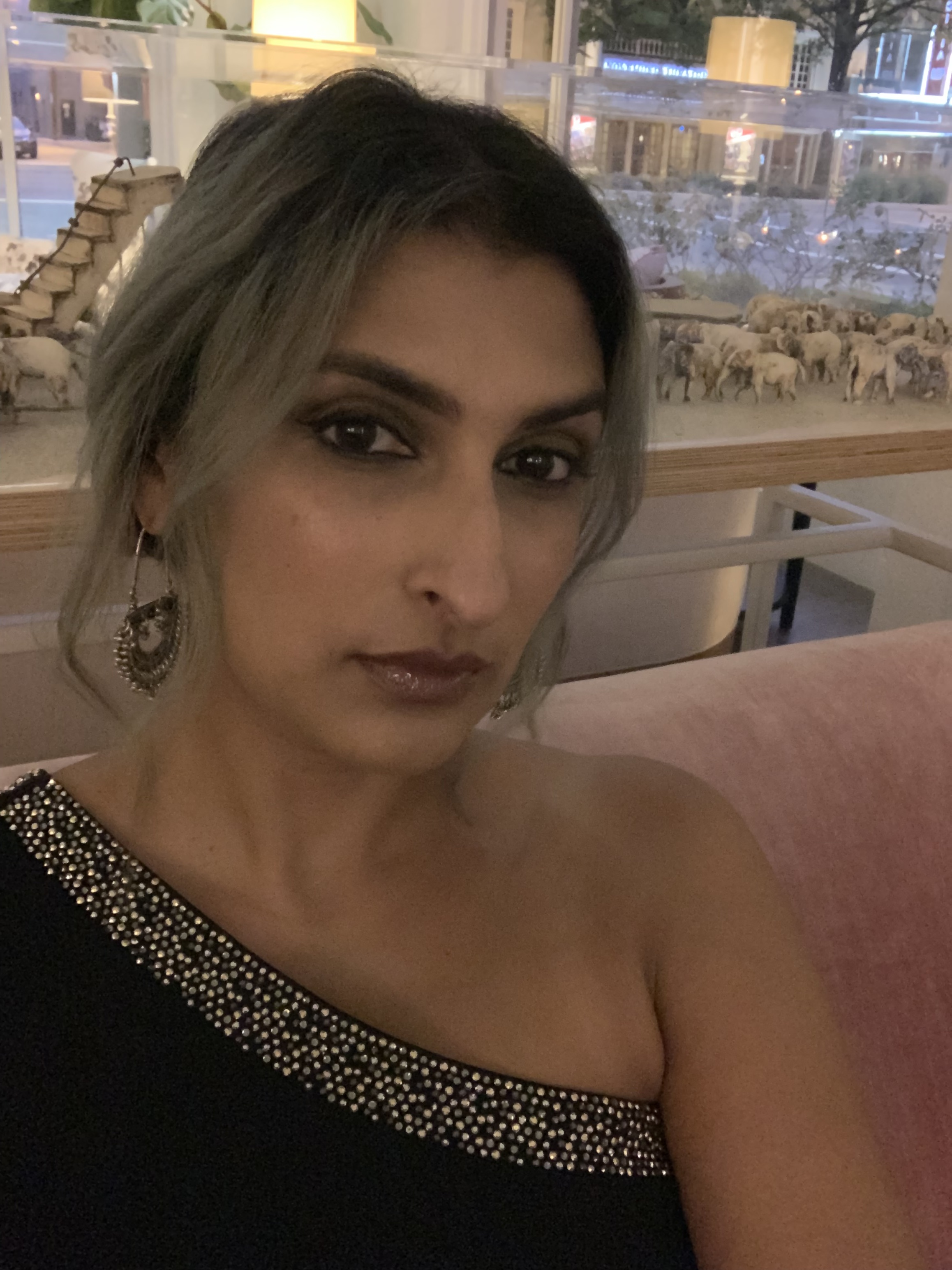
- Born: December 27, 1976 (age 49); Nashville, Tennessee, U.S.
- Education: USC Film School
- Occupations: Director, editor
- Years active: 2000–present
- Website: farahx.com

Farah Zeb Khalid also known as Farah X, is a Pakistani American director and editor. She is known for her work on the documentary film The Remix: Hip Hop X Fashion.

== Life and career ==
Farah was born in Nashville, Tennessee and grew up in Los Angeles, California. In 1995, she modeled in London and Paris before returning to Los Angeles to attend the USC School of Cinematic Arts undergraduate program. In 2005, she joined Sunset Edit as their only female editor. She has worked with singers such as Prince, Mariah Carey, Beyoncé and Rapsody. In 2006, she directed a segment for the feature documentary Dropped. In 2015, Farah directed a piece for Mariah Carey’s Infinity.

In 2019, Farah directed a music video for Rapsody's Oprah, featuring Leikeli47 and Reyna Biddy, which won Best Music Video at the Urbanworld Film Festival in 2020. Farah co-directed The Remix: Hip Hop X Fashion, along with Lisa Cortes, which premiered at the Tribeca Film Festival. It also won six Best Documentary awards including at the Sidewalk Film Festival and Milwaukee Film Festival.

In 2021, Farah directed a five episode online series, SeeHer: Multiplicity, which won a Gracie award for Original Programming in 2022. The series also won 2022 gold and silver Telly awards.

She directed an episode for Hulu's Documentary Series Rap Caviar Presents in conjunction with Spotify.

Farah collaborated with Beyoncé on Renaissance: A Film By Beyoncé. Most recently, Farah directed the documentary for Stray Kids: The Dominate Experience film, which debuted as the number one film globally on its opening weekend and made history as the first K-pop concert film to ever reach #1 at the box office.

== Filmography ==
Year	Film	Director	Editor	Note
2026	Stray Kids: The Dominate Experience	Yes		Feature Film
2023	Rap Caviar Presents: Hate Me Now	Yes		Documentary Series
2022	The Beauty of Blackness		Yes	Documentary
2021	SeeHer: Multiplicity	Yes		5 episodes
2021	Crusaders: Ex Jehovah's Witnesses Speak Out		Yes	Documentary
2021	Made by Her Monuments	Yes		Documentary
2019	The Remix: Hip Hop X Fashion	Yes	Yes	Documentary
2019	Oprah	Yes	Yes	Video short
2017	Interior Motives		Yes	Documentary
2015	Joan Baez: Rebel Icon		Yes	Documentary
2015	Infinity	Yes	Yes	Video short
2014	You're Mine (Eternal)		Yes	Video short
2013	We Came Home		Yes	Documentary
2011	The Life and Death of Steriogram		Yes	Feature Film
2008	Crepe Covered Sidewalks		Yes	Documentary
2008	Fall Out Boy: I Don't Care		Yes	Video short
2008	Number One with a Bullet		Yes	Documentary
2007	Incubus: Look Alive		Yes	Video short
2006	Dropped	Yes	Yes	Documentary
2006	One Blood		Yes	Video short
2006	Bossy (Kelis song)		Yes	Video short
2000	Meta		Yes	Short film
2000	Hellraiser: Resurrection		Yes	Video short
