= Lisa Cortés =

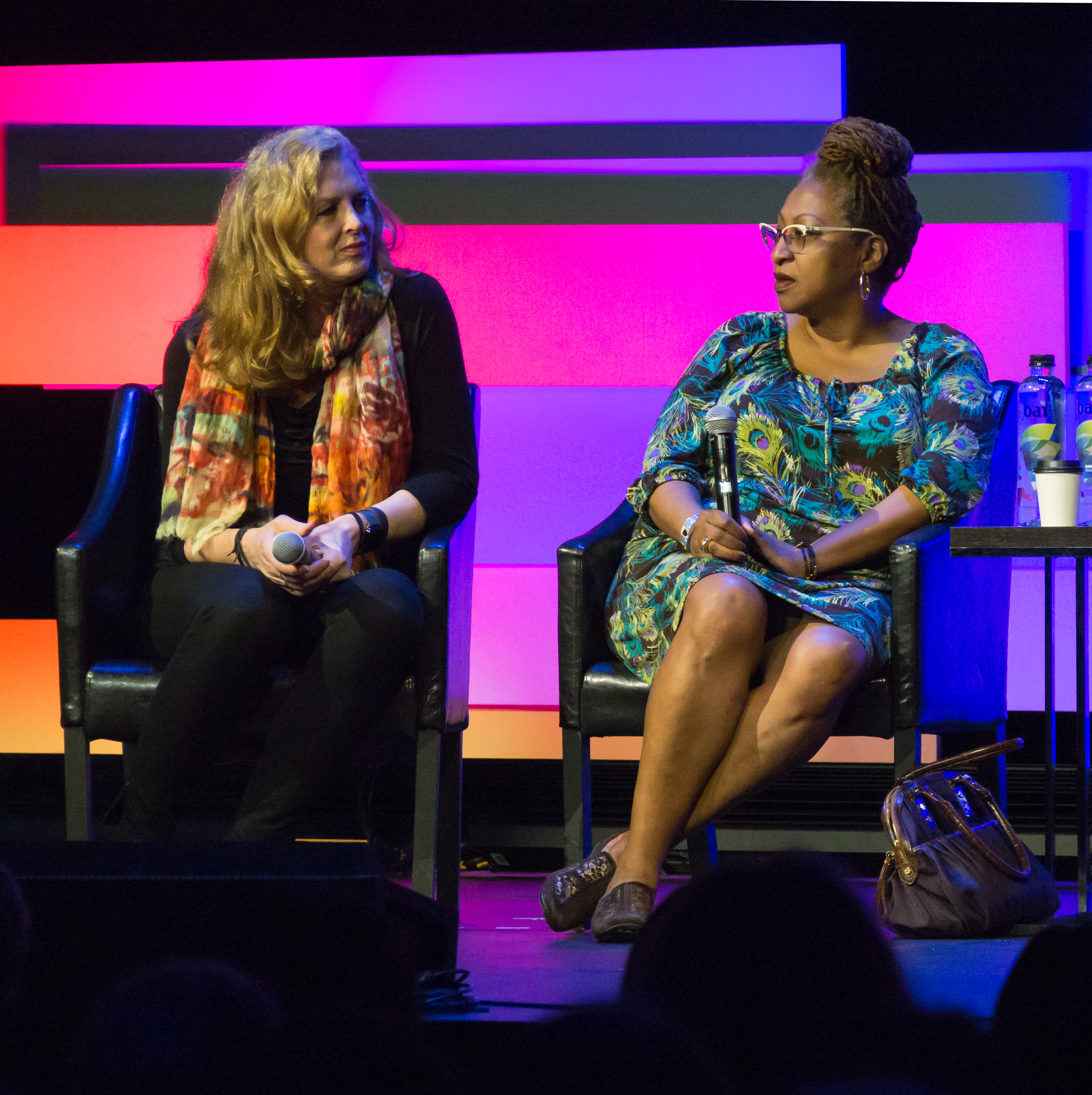
- Lisa Cortés (right) in 2018
- Born: Lisa Cortés; Milford, Connecticut, US
- Education: Yale University
- Occupations: Film director; film producer
- Years active: 2004–present

Lisa Cortés is an American producer and director of a number of film and television works, including Little Richard: I Am Everything in 2023.

== Early life, education and early career ==
Cortés is a native of Milford, Connecticut and a graduate of Milford Academy. She attended Yale University, graduating with a degree in American Studies. Cortés began her career at Def Jam, later Rush Producers Management and then as an executive at Mercury Records. She is now the CEO of Cortés Filmworks.

== Filmmaking ==
Cortés is an alumnus of New York Film Academy. She produced the feature films The Apollo, Little Apple, and Invisible Beauty, and worked with Lee Daniels to produce The Woodsman, Shadow Boxer, Tennessee, and Precious.

Cortés co-directed a film about the work of Stacey Abrams in All In: The Fight for Democracy with Liz Garbus; The Remix: Hip Hop X Fashion, and Little Richard: I Am Everything with Dee Rees as Executive Producer, a documentary which premiered at the Sundance Film Festival.

In 2023, Cortés co-directed The Space Race: The Untold Story of the First Black Astronauts, featuring the stories of Guion Bluford, Ed Dwight, and Charles Bolden. The documentary was produced for National Geographic with Executive Producers Frank Marshall, Tony Rosenthal, and former astronaut Leland Melvin and producers Keero Birla and Mark Monroe.

== Selected awards and recognitions ==
- The Apollo - Primetime Emmy Award for Outstanding Documentary or Nonfiction Special in 2020; shortlisted for nomination of the Academy Award for Best Documentary Feature Film at the 92nd Academy Awards.
- Precious - six nominations at the 82nd Academy Awards, including Best Picture, Best Director and Best Actress. Won Best Supporting Actress and Best Adapted Screenplay.
- Little Richard: I am Everything - Nominations: Peabody Award, Grammy Award for Best Music Film, Dorian Award for LGBTQ Documentary of the Year, 2023 Washington D.C. Area Film Critics Association Award for Best Documentary.
