= Mudbound (film) =

2017 film directed by Dee Rees

- Promotional release poster
- Directed by: Dee Rees
- Screenplay by: Virgil Williams; Dee Rees
- Based on: Mudbound by Hillary Jordan
- Produced by: Sally Jo Effenson; Cassian Elwes; Carl Effenson; Charles D. King; Kim Roth; Christopher Lemole; Tim Zajaros
- Starring: Carey Mulligan; Jason Clarke; Jason Mitchell; Mary J. Blige; Rob Morgan; Jonathan Banks; Garrett Hedlund
- Cinematography: Rachel Morrison
- Edited by: Mako Kamitsuna
- Music by: Tamar-kali
- Production companies: Elevated Films; Joule Films
- Distributed by: Netflix
- Release dates: January 21, 2017 (Sundance); November 17, 2017 (United States)
- Running time: 134 minutes
- Country: United States
- Language: English
- Budget: $10–$11.1 million
- Box office: $117,344

Mudbound is a 2017 American historical drama film directed by Dee Rees. It was written by Rees and Virgil Williams, who based their screenplay on the 2008 novel Mudbound by Hillary Jordan. It stars Carey Mulligan, Garrett Hedlund, Jason Clarke, Jason Mitchell, Jonathan Banks, Rob Morgan, and Mary J. Blige. The film depicts two World War II veterans – one white, one black – who return to rural Mississippi each to address racism and PTSD in his own way. The film premiered at the 2017 Sundance Film Festival on January 21, 2017, and was released on Netflix and in limited release on November 17, 2017, to positive reviews.

At the 75th Golden Globe Awards it received nominations for Best Supporting Actress (Blige) and Best Original Song ("Mighty River"). At the 90th Academy Awards, the film earned four nominations: Best Supporting Actress for Blige; Best Original Song for Blige, Raphael Saadiq and Taura Stinson (Blige became the first person to ever be nominated for both acting and songwriting in the same year); Best Adapted Screenplay for Rees and Virgil Williams (Rees became the first African-American woman to ever be nominated) and Best Cinematography, which made Rachel Morrison the first woman nominated in the category.

== Plot ==
In the Mississippi Delta, white brothers Henry and Jamie McAllan dig a grave during a rainstorm and struggle to lower their deceased father's coffin into it. When the Jacksons, a black tenant farmer family pass by in a wagon, Henry asks the father, Hap Jackson, for help. Henry seems uncomfortable asking and Hap hesitates to reply.

A few years prior, Henry is conned out of renting a home and is forced to live near sharecroppers on a farm outside the town of Marietta, Mississippi and moves there with his wife Laura, their daughters, and his virulently racist father, Pappy. The Jackson family, led by tenant farmer Hap and his wife Florence, work the farm's cotton field and dream of owning their own land one day. As World War II begins, Jamie and the Jacksons' eldest son, Ronsel, join the United States Army Air Corps and U.S. Army, respectively. Both men experience severe war trauma in the European theater as Jamie flies B-25 bombers and Ronsel commands tanks. Ronsel also falls in love with a white German woman.

Meanwhile, in Mississippi both families continue to live in poverty and support each other out of necessity. Florence also helps the McAllan family when their two young daughters fall ill with whooping cough; and then Laura offers Florence work to help care for her daughters permanently. When the Jacksons' mule has to be euthanized, Henry offers to rent out his mule but exacts half of the Jacksons' crop in payment. Leaving the Jacksons nearly no choice but to accept, the proposed arrangement would diminish them from tenant farmers to the lower economic and social status of sharecroppers. Hap, who serves as the preacher for the local Black community, falls while helping to build a church, breaking his leg and rendering him unable to work his fields. Laura sneaks money from her husband's safe so Hap can be properly treated by a doctor, much to Henry's disapproval and causing their passionless marriage to worsen. Hap recovers and prevents his family from further social decline.

When the war ends, Ronsel and Jamie return home and realize that they have changed but the Mississippi Delta has not. Jamie becomes an alcoholic and has PTSD. Ronsel, accustomed to the relative lack of racism among Europeans, struggles with racism in Mississippi. They become aware of each other's difficulties and bond over their war experiences. Ronsel questions why Jamie treats him with respect, and Jamie recounts that on a bomber mission a Black fighter pilot saved his life. Jamie grows close to Laura but his alcoholism worsens and he drunkenly crashes his truck. Henry leaves on a trip and tells Jamie to depart from the farm before he returns. Ronsel receives a letter and photo from the German woman with whom he had been romantically involved and learns that they had a child together and she wants him to come to Europe. The photo is of her and their biracial child. Ronsel shares this with Jamie while driving together when their truck passes Pappy, and Ronsel is forced to duck down to hide. Pappy confronts Jamie about him socializing with Ronsel and scolds him for his drunken behavior and sneers at Laura, claiming she has romantic feelings for Jamie. Later, Ronsel realizes that he lost the photograph, which Pappy finds in the truck. Laura confronts Jamie as he prepares to leave and they have sex.

As Ronsel frantically searches for his photograph, he is ambushed and beaten by Pappy and members of the Ku Klux Klan. Pappy brings Jamie to a barn where the Klan is preparing to kill Ronsel for fathering a child with a white woman. Jamie points a gun at his father in an effort to save his friend and is also beaten by the Klan. As Jamie is restrained, he is told to choose Ronsel's punishment for his crime — to lose his eyes, tongue or testicles; or death. Through the pain, Jamie whispers "tongue" and Ronsel's tongue is cut out. Ronsel is left bound and wounded for his family to find. Fed up, later that night, Jamie wakes Pappy who had previously belittled Jamie's war experience because he had not looked into the eyes of the people he killed during the war. Jamie looks Pappy in the eye and smothers him with a pillow. Laura lies to Henry that Pappy died in his sleep.

The following day, the Jacksons appear to be leaving with their meager belongings in the wagon when they pass Henry and Jamie who are struggling to bury Pappy. Hap accedes to Henry's request to help with the coffin and says a prayer over the grave. In a rebuke to Pappy's wickedness, Hap recites from the Book of Job, verses 14:2–12. Jamie approaches the Jacksons' wagon and gives the German woman's letter to Florence, asking her to give it to Ronsel.

Much later, Jamie moves to the city. Ronsel returns to Europe and reunites with his German lover and their son.

== Cast ==
- Carey Mulligan as Laura McAllan (née Chappell), Henry's wife
- Jason Clarke as Henry McAllan, Laura's husband and Jamie's older brother
- Mary J. Blige as Florence Jackson, Hap's wife
- Rob Morgan as Hap Jackson, Florence's husband
- Jason Mitchell as Ronsel Jackson, Florence and Hap's eldest son
- Garrett Hedlund as Jamie McAllan, Henry's younger brother
- Jonathan Banks as Pappy McAllan, Henry and Jamie's father
- Frankie Smith as Marlon Jackson, Florence and Hap's second son
- Kennedy Derosin as Lilly May Jackson, Florence and Hap's daughter
- Joshua J. Williams as Ruel Jackson, Florence and Hap's youngest son
- Elizabeth Windley as Amanda Leigh McAllan, Laura and Henry's eldest daughter
- Piper Blaire as Isabelle McAllan, Laura and Henry's youngest daughter
- Jason Kirkpatrick as Orris Stokes, a local racist
- Kerry Cahill as Rose Tricklebank, a shopkeeper in town
- Oyeleke Oluwafolakanmi as Cleve
- Kelvin Harrison Jr. as Weeks
- Lucy Faust as Vera Atwood, Carl's wife
- Dylan Arnold as Carl Atwood, a white tenant farmer on Henry's land
- Samantha Hoefer as Resl, a German woman who Ronsel met while abroad
- Geraldine Singer as Mrs. Chappell, Laura's mother
- Henry Frost as Teddy Chappell, Laura's brother
- Claudio Laniado as Dr. Pearlman
- Charley Vance as Sheriff Thacker

== Production ==
Development on the film was announced on March 21, 2016, with Dee Rees engaged as director and Carey Mulligan, Garrett Hedlund, Jason Clarke and Jason Mitchell cast in roles. On May 25, Mary J. Blige was added to the cast. On May 31, Jonathan Banks and Rob Morgan were cast.

=== Filming ===
Filming began in New Orleans, Louisiana, in May 2016. For the film's opening scene, artificial rain produced by rain towers was used, while actual rain was filmed for wide shots. Shooting took place over the course of 29 days, including two days in Budapest, Hungary, for scenes set during World War II.

The production was impacted by both heat and stormy weather. On one occasion, Rachel Morrison, the film's director of photography, developed sun poisoning. On another occasion, filming had to be postponed due to a nearby tornado warning. A scene between the characters Ronsel and Jamie that was initially planned to take place on the side of a road was altered due to rain, instead taking place inside Jamie's pickup truck.

==== Cinematography ====
Dee Rees asked Morrison to focus on "the idea of the American dream vs. the American reality," so Morrison turned to books by Farm Security Administration photographers for reference points regarding color and composition, in particular Dorothea Lange, Arthur Rothstein, Ben Shahn and Walker Evans. Another primary source for her was a Gordon Parks essay in Life magazine in the 1950s called "A Segregation Story" – regarding color that "felt period, but it didn't feel washed-out".

Morrison's term for the goal they tried to achieve is "subjective naturalism," which she describes as first of all, real, and then potentially dramatized with light at main plot points – but remaining real throughout. Through that reality, the focus was on the elements in the picture and not the period itself: "The period wasn't a character in this film. The mud was a character, the weather was a character, the house was a character ... we were trying to make more of a commentary about just how tough times were through experiences." A. O. Scott in the New York Times wrote of the result: "Rachel ... brings the soil, the flora and the weather to life in a way that emphasizes the archaic, elemental power of the story."

=== Costume design ===
Michael T. Boyd served as the film's costume designer. Some of the clothing worn by the poorer characters in the film appears dated more to the 1930s, as opposed to the 1940s when the film takes place; this was an intentional decision meant to give the impression of clothes passed down between generations of people unable to afford newer ones. The military and pilot uniforms seen in the film were replicas of real uniforms.

For the scene in which Ronsel is ambushed by members of the Ku Klux Klan, Boyd utilized a mixture of outfits, with "the poorer men with the feed bag-looking hoods with the eyes cut out and tied with a string and others with the full Klan regalia. I don't think it would have been as powerful a scene if I would have had them all dress in white robes. It's somehow more real and intimate; this wasn't a parade or a burning-cross meeting for show but pure intimate violence and I think the mixture added texture to the event."

== Release ==
Following its 2017 Sundance Film Festival premiere, Mudbound had distribution offers from A24, Annapurna Pictures and Entertainment Studios. On January 29, 2017, Netflix acquired distribution rights to the film for $12.5 million in the largest deal made at Sundance that year. The film premiered on the streaming platform, as well as began a one-week theatrical release in New York City and Los Angeles, on November 17, 2017.

== Reception ==
=== Critical response ===
On Rotten Tomatoes, the film has an approval rating of 97% based on 199 reviews, with an average rating of 8.20/10. The site's critical consensus reads, "Mudbound offers a well-acted, finely detailed snapshot of American history whose scenes of rural class struggle resonate far beyond their period setting." On Metacritic the film has a weighted average score of 85 out of 100, based on 44 critics, indicating "universal acclaim".

Richard Roeper of the Chicago Sun-Times gave the film 3.5 out of 4 stars, praising the cast and direction. Writing for Rolling Stone, Peter Travers also gave the film 3.5 out of 4 stars, praising Blige's performance and Rees' direction, saying: "The director and her cinematographer Rachel Morrison do wonders with the elements that batter the people of every race and social class in the Delta. But it's the storm raging inside these characters that rivets our attention and makes Mudbound a film that grabs you and won't let go."

In 2019, The A.V. Club named Mudbound on its list of the 100 best movies of the 2010s.

=== Accolades ===
Award	Date of ceremony	Category	Recipient(s)	Result	Ref.
AACTA International Awards	January 6, 2018	Best Supporting Actress	Mary J. Blige	Nominated	
AARP's Movies for Grownups Awards	February 5, 2018	Best Ensemble	The cast of Mudbound	Nominated	
Academy Awards	March 4, 2018	Best Supporting Actress	Mary J. Blige	Nominated	
Academy Awards	March 4, 2018	Best Adapted Screenplay	Dee Rees and Virgil Williams	Nominated	
Academy Awards	March 4, 2018	Best Cinematography	Rachel Morrison	Nominated	
Academy Awards	March 4, 2018	Best Original Song	"Mighty River" – Mary J. Blige, Raphael Saadiq and Taura Stinson	Nominated	
Alliance of Women Film Journalists	January 9, 2018	Best Adapted Screenplay	Dee Rees and Virgil Williams	Nominated	
Alliance of Women Film Journalists	January 9, 2018	Best Actress in a Supporting Role	Mary J. Blige	Nominated	
Alliance of Women Film Journalists	January 9, 2018	Best Ensemble Cast – Casting Director	Billy Hopkins and Ashley Ingram	Won	
Alliance of Women Film Journalists	January 9, 2018	Best Woman Director	Dee Rees	Nominated	
Alliance of Women Film Journalists	January 9, 2018	Best Woman Screenwriter	Dee Rees and Virgil Williams	Nominated	
American Society of Cinematographers	February 17, 2018	Outstanding Achievement in Cinematography in Theatrical Releases	Rachel Morrison	Nominated	
Austin Film Critics Association	January 8, 2018	Best Supporting Actress	Mary J. Blige	Nominated	
Austin Film Critics Association	January 8, 2018	Best Adapted Screenplay	Dee Rees and Virgil Williams	Nominated	
Austin Film Critics Association	January 8, 2018	Best Cinematography	Rachel Morrison	Nominated	
Black Reel Awards	February 22, 2018	Outstanding Film	Mudbound	Nominated	
Black Reel Awards	February 22, 2018	Outstanding Director	Dee Rees	Nominated	
Black Reel Awards	February 22, 2018	Outstanding Supporting Actor	Jason Mitchell	Won	
Black Reel Awards	February 22, 2018	Outstanding Supporting Actress	Mary J. Blige	Nominated	
Black Reel Awards	February 22, 2018	Outstanding Screenplay	Virgil Williams and Dee Rees	Nominated	
Black Reel Awards	February 22, 2018	Outstanding Ensemble	Billy Hopkins and Ashley Ingram	Won	
Black Reel Awards	February 22, 2018	Outstanding Original Song	"Mighty River" – Mary J. Blige, Raphael Saadiq and Taura Stinson	Won	
Black Reel Awards	February 22, 2018	Outstanding Breakthrough Performance, Female	Mary J. Blige	Nominated	
Chicago Film Critics Association	December 12, 2017	Best Supporting Actor	Jason Mitchell	Nominated	
Chicago Film Critics Association	December 12, 2017	Best Supporting Actress	Mary J. Blige	Nominated	
Chicago Film Critics Association	December 12, 2017	Best Adapted Screenplay	Dee Rees and Virgil Williams	Nominated	
Chicago Film Critics Association	December 12, 2017	Best Cinematography	Rachel Morrison	Nominated	
Critics' Choice Movie Awards	January 11, 2018	Best Supporting Actress	Mary J. Blige	Nominated	
Critics' Choice Movie Awards	January 11, 2018	Best Ensemble	The cast of Mudbound	Nominated	
Critics' Choice Movie Awards	January 11, 2018	Best Adapted Screenplay	Dee Rees and Virgil Williams	Nominated	
Critics' Choice Movie Awards	January 11, 2018	Best Cinematography	Rachel Morrison	Nominated	
Dallas–Fort Worth Film Critics Association	December 13, 2017	Best Supporting Actress	Mary J. Blige	3rd Place	
Detroit Film Critics Society	December 7, 2017	Best Ensemble	The cast of Mudbound	Nominated	
Dorian Awards	February 24, 2018	Supporting Film Performance of the Year – Actress	Mary J. Blige	Nominated	
Florida Film Critics Circle	December 23, 2017	Best Supporting Actress	Mary J. Blige	Nominated	
Georgia Film Critics Association	January 12, 2018	Best Adapted Screenplay	Dee Rees and Virgil Williams	Nominated	
Georgia Film Critics Association	January 12, 2018	Best Cinematography	Rachel Morrison	Nominated	
Georgia Film Critics Association	January 12, 2018	Best Original Song	"Mighty River" – Raphael Saadiq, Mary J. Blige and Taura Stinson	Nominated	
Georgia Film Critics Association	January 12, 2018	Best Ensemble	The cast of Mudbound	Nominated	
Golden Globe Awards	January 7, 2018	Best Supporting Actress – Motion Picture	Mary J. Blige	Nominated	
Golden Globe Awards	January 7, 2018	Best Original Song	"Mighty River" – Raphael Saadiq, Mary J. Blige and Taura Stinson	Nominated	
Golden Tomato Awards	January 3, 2018	Best Limited Release 2017	Mudbound	5th Place	
Golden Tomato Awards	January 3, 2018	Best Drama Movie 2017	Mudbound	3rd Place	
Gotham Independent Film Awards	November 27, 2017	Breakthrough Actor	Mary J. Blige	Nominated	
Gotham Independent Film Awards	November 27, 2017	Special Jury Award – Ensemble Performance	The cast of Mudbound	Won	
Guild of Music Supervisors Awards	February 8, 2018	Best Song/Recording Created for a Film	"Mighty River"	Nominated	
Hollywood Film Awards	November 5, 2017	Hollywood Breakout Ensemble Award	The cast of Mudbound	Won	
Hollywood Film Awards	November 5, 2017	Hollywood Breakout Actress Award	Mary J. Blige	Won	
Hollywood Music in Media Awards	November 16, 2017	Original Score – Feature Film	Tamar-kali	Nominated	
Hollywood Music in Media Awards	November 16, 2017	Original Song – Feature Film	"Mighty River" – Raphael Saadiq, Mary J. Blige and Taura Stinson	Nominated	
Humanitas Prize	February 16, 2018	Feature – Drama	Dee Rees and Virgil Williams	Won (Note: Tied with The Post.)	
Independent Spirit Awards	March 3, 2018	Robert Altman Award	Dee Rees, Billy Hopkins, Ashley Ingram, Jonathan Banks, Mary J. Blige, Jason Clarke, Garrett Hedlund, Jason Mitchell, Rob Morgan and Carey Mulligan	Won	
IndieWire Honors	November 2, 2017	Breakthrough Performance	Mary J. Blige	Won	
Location Managers Guild Awards	April 7, 2017	Outstanding Locations in Period Film	Wise Wolfe, Imre Legman	Nominated	
Los Angeles Film Critics Association	January 13, 2018	Best Supporting Actress	Mary J. Blige	Runner-up	
New York Film Critics Circle	January 3, 2018	Best Cinematographer	Rachel Morrison	Won	
New York Film Critics Online	December 10, 2017	Best Picture	Mudbound	Won (Note: Tied with The Florida Project.)	
New York Film Critics Online	December 10, 2017	Best Director	Dee Rees	Won	
New York Film Critics Online	December 10, 2017	Best Ensemble Cast	The cast of Mudbound	Won	
New York Film Critics Online	December 10, 2017	Top Ten Films	Mudbound	Won	
Online Film Critics Society	December 28, 2017	Best Supporting Actress	Mary J. Blige	Nominated	
Online Film Critics Society	December 28, 2017	Best Cinematography	Rachel Morrison	Nominated	
San Diego Film Critics Society	December 11, 2017	Best Adapted Screenplay	Dee Rees and Virgil Williams	Runner-up	
San Diego Film Critics Society	December 11, 2017	Best Ensemble	The cast of Mudbound	Won	
San Francisco Film Critics Circle	December 10, 2017	Best Adapted Screenplay	Dee Rees and Virgil Williams	Nominated	
Santa Barbara International Film Festival	January 31, 2018	Virtuoso Award	Mary J. Blige	Won	
Satellite Awards	February 10, 2018	Best Film	Mudbound	Nominated	
Satellite Awards	February 10, 2018	Best Director	Dee Rees	Nominated	
Satellite Awards	February 10, 2018	Best Supporting Actress	Mary J. Blige	Nominated	
Screen Actors Guild Awards	January 21, 2018	Outstanding Performance by a Cast in a Motion Picture	The cast of Mudbound	Nominated	
Screen Actors Guild Awards	January 21, 2018	Outstanding Performance by a Female Actor in a Supporting Role	Mary J. Blige	Nominated	
St. Louis Film Critics Association	December 17, 2017	Best Adapted Screenplay	Dee Rees and Virgil Williams	Nominated	
USC Scripter Awards	February 10, 2018	Best Screenplay	Dee Rees, Virgil Williams and Hillary Jordan	Nominated	
Washington D.C. Area Film Critics Association	December 8, 2017	Best Director	Dee Rees	Nominated	
Washington D.C. Area Film Critics Association	December 8, 2017	Best Supporting Actor	Jason Mitchell	Nominated	
Washington D.C. Area Film Critics Association	December 8, 2017	Best Supporting Actress	Mary J. Blige	Nominated	
Washington D.C. Area Film Critics Association	December 8, 2017	Best Adapted Screenplay	Dee Rees and Virgil Williams	Won	
Washington D.C. Area Film Critics Association	December 8, 2017	Best Cinematography	Rachel Morrison	Nominated	
Washington D.C. Area Film Critics Association	December 8, 2017	Best Acting Ensemble	The cast of Mudbound	Nominated	
Women Film Critics Circle	December 17, 2017	Best Movie by a Woman	Mudbound	Nominated	
Women Film Critics Circle	December 17, 2017	Best Woman Storyteller	Dee Rees	Nominated	
Women Film Critics Circle	December 17, 2017	Josephine Baker Award	Mudbound	Won	
Women Film Critics Circle	December 17, 2017	Karen Morley Award	Mudbound	Nominated	
Women Film Critics Circle	December 17, 2017	Courage in Filmmaking	Dee Rees	Won	
Writers Guild of America Awards	February 11, 2018	Best Adapted Screenplay	Dee Rees and Virgil Williams	Nominated	

== See also ==
- List of black films of the 2010s
