= Dee Rees =

American screenwriter and director (born 1977)

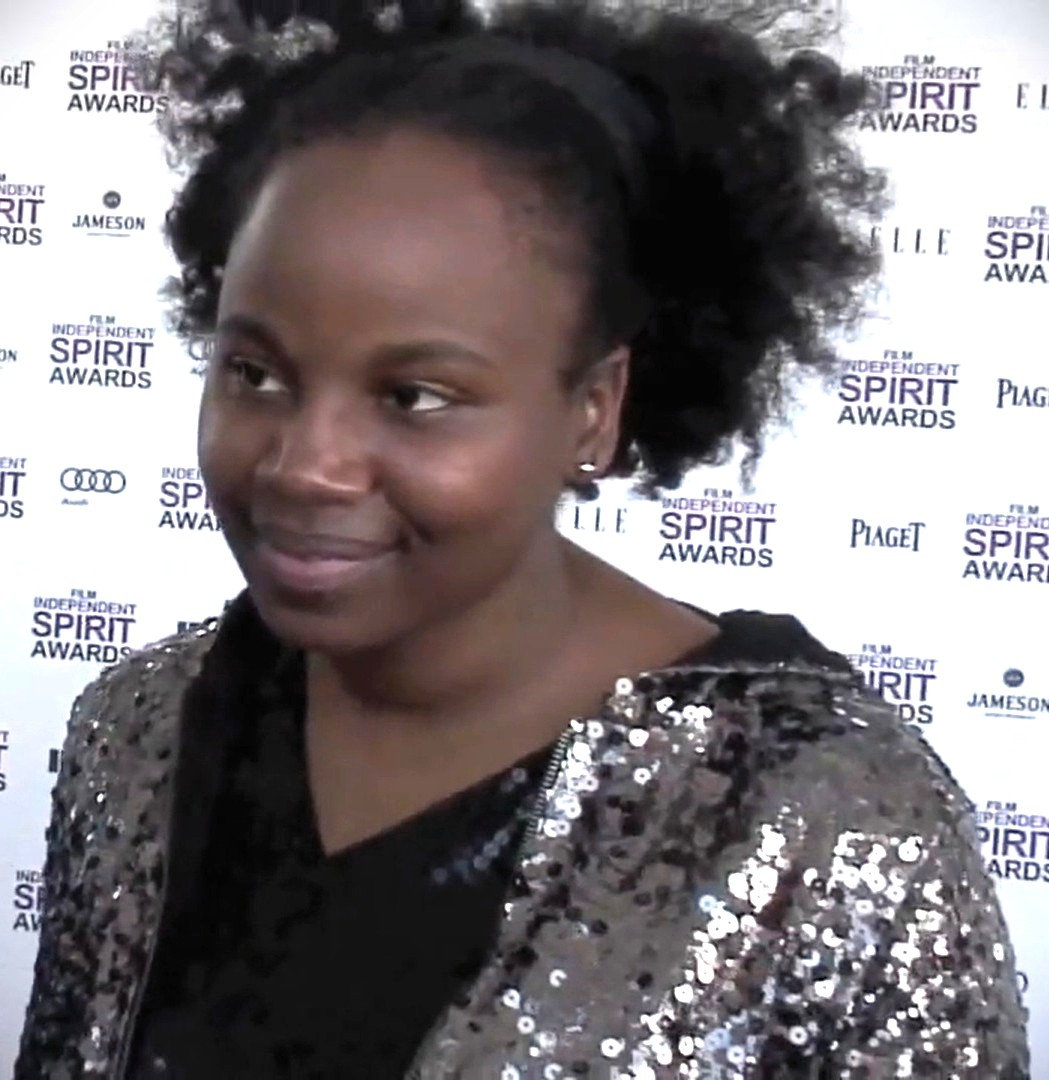
- Rees in 2012
- Born: Diandrea Rees; February 7, 1977 (age 49); Nashville, Tennessee, U.S.
- Education: New York University; Florida A&M University
- Occupations: Film director; film producer; screenwriter
- Years active: 2005–present
- Spouse: Sarah M. Broom

Diandrea Rees (born February 7, 1977) is an American screenwriter and director. She is known for her feature films Pariah (2011), Bessie (2015), Mudbound (2017), and The Last Thing He Wanted (2020). Rees has also written and directed episodes for television series including Empire, When We Rise, and Philip K. Dick's Electric Dreams.

Rees is the first African-American woman nominated for the Academy Award for Best Adapted Screenplay, for Mudbound. She has also received Primetime Emmy Award nominations for Outstanding Writing and Outstanding Directing for a Limited or Anthology Series or Movie, and won the Directors Guild of America Award for Outstanding Directing – Miniseries or TV Film for Bessie.

Rees received a United States Artists Fellowship in 2011.

== Early life and education ==
Rees was born in 1977 in Nashville, Tennessee. Her father was a police officer and her mother was a scientist at Vanderbilt University. Rees attended local schools and college at Florida A&M University. After graduating from business school, Rees held an array of jobs, including working as a salesperson for panty-liners, a vendor for wart-remover and bunion pads, and also worked in marketing and brand management. While working for Dr. Scholl's, Rees worked on set for a commercial and she realized she enjoyed the creation of film content. This led her to pursue film school. For graduate school, she attended New York University's Tisch School of the Arts. While at New York University for film, Spike Lee was her professor and mentor. Dee Rees went on to work under Spike Lee on his films Inside Man (2006) and When the Levees Broke (2006). During this time, she worked on a script for what would later be the feature film Pariah. For her graduate thesis, she adapted the first act of the script and directed it as a short film of the same name. In 2007, the short played at 40 film festivals around the world, winning numerous accolades, including the Audience Award at the Los Angeles Film Festival.

== Career ==
Rees' first full-length film was a documentary, Eventual Salvation (2009), which aired on the Sundance Channel. The film follows her American-born, 80-year-old grandmother, Amma, as she returns to Monrovia, Liberia to rebuild her home and community. She had barely escaped the devastating Liberian Civil War only a decade earlier.

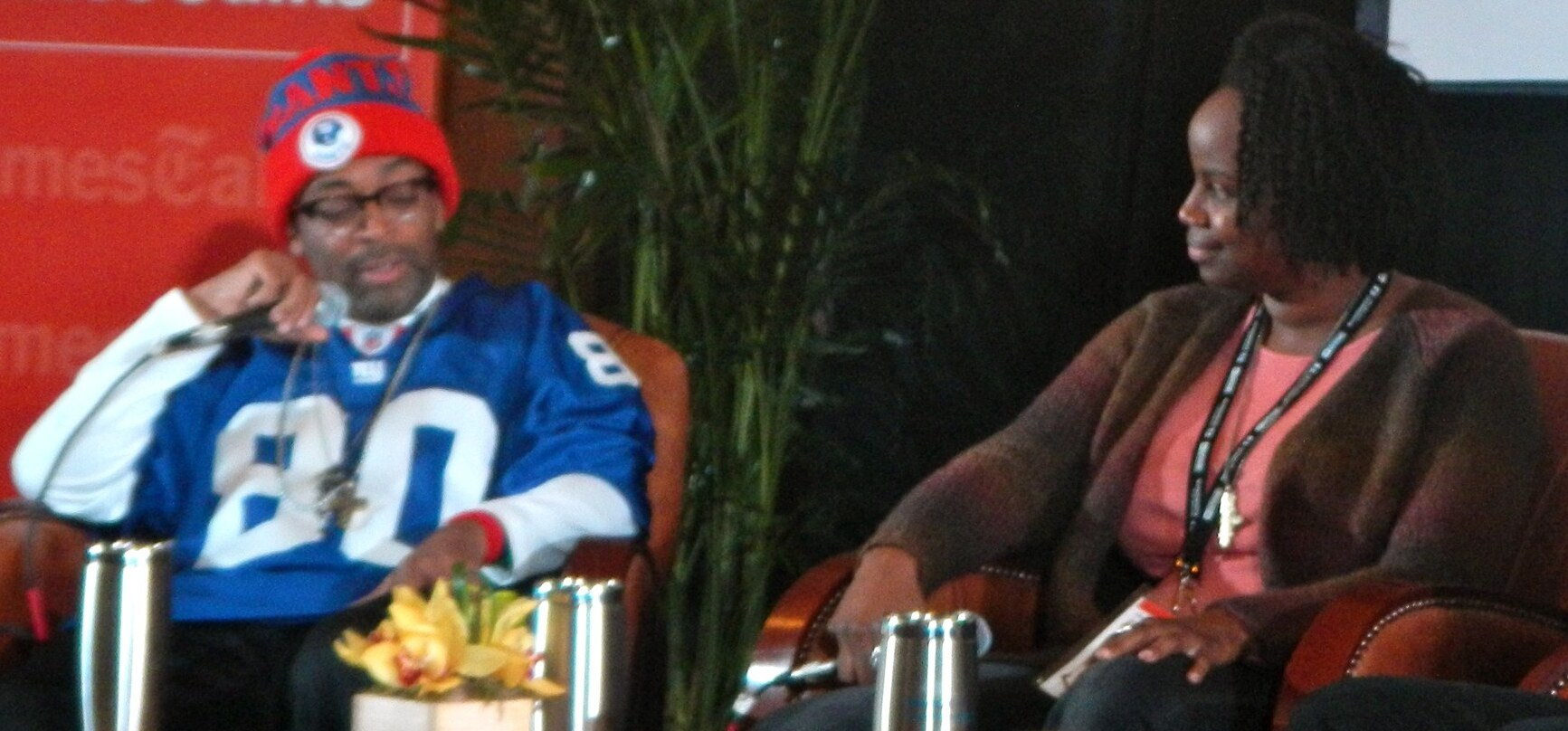
Spike Lee with Dee Rees (right) at the 2012 Sundance Film Festival

Rees completed development and filming of her debut feature film, Pariah, which she has described as semi-autobiographical. In graduate school Rees interned for Spike Lee, whom she got to executive produce the film. It premiered at the 2011 Sundance Film Festival. Lisa Schwartzman of Entertainment Weekly wrote, "In her fearless, world-here-I-am! debut Pariah, writer-director Dee Rees demonstrates, with simplicity and verve, that there's no substitute for authenticity". Pariah explores the complexities of religion, politics and socioeconomic class within and surrounding a Black family. The short film version of Pariah was initially a thesis project done by Dee Rees in film school. It was difficult to receive funding for the feature film, and the process took about five years to reach completion. The format and content changed significantly from the short film to the feature film. The transition from short film to feature film meant it needed to be more accessible for a wider audience in order to make money. This accessibility reached new audiences and sparked new conversations that were focused on blackness and sexuality in a new way.

At the time Pariah (2011) was released, the film was one of the very few films that follow the journey of a young person of color as they come to terms with their sexuality and come out to their friends and families. In 2011, she won many awards for Pariah, including the John Cassavetes Award at the Independent Spirit Awards, the Gotham Independent Film Award for Breakthrough Director, the Outstanding Independent Motion Picture Award at the NAACP Image Awards, and the Outstanding Film –Limited Release Award at the GLAAD Media Award in 2012.

Pariah has been compared to the written work of Audre Lorde, specifically Zami: a New Spelling of My Name. Both forms provide a different take on the lived experiences of young Black lesbian women in a way that gives the characters depth and power. Both stories of identity, they are not only diversifying the characters audiences enjoy in media, but also providing an authentic expression of these lives.

In 2015, Rees' film Bessie premiered on HBO, starring Queen Latifah as the iconic singer Bessie Smith. The film was well received by critics.

It also won four Primetime Emmy Awards, including the Primetime Emmy Award for Outstanding Television Movie. Rees was nominated for Outstanding Directing for a Miniseries, Movie or a Dramatic Special and Outstanding Writing for a Miniseries, Movie or a Dramatic Special.

Together with Virgil Williams, Rees wrote Mudbound, a period drama adapted from the 2008 novel of the same name by Hillary Jordan. Rees also directed the film, starring Carey Mulligan, Garrett Hedlund, Jason Clarke, Jason Mitchell, and Mary J. Blige. After being shown at Sundance in 2017, Mudbound became the highest purchase of the festival, being bought for $12.5 million by Netflix. Mudbound was shot in New Orleans over 28 days in the summer of 2016. The film tells the story of two families in the Mississippi Delta in the 1940s. The McAllan family is white and their neighbors, the Jacksons, are black. The Jacksons are sharecroppers who have a connection to the land, while the McAllans are a middle-class family that own a large plot of land in Mississippi. Mudbound tells a story of racism and race relations that continue to be played out today. The movie explores whiteness and the privilege associated with it, while comparing and contrasting the experiences of white and Black people of the period. This work contains many personal connections for Rees, such as her grandfather's experiences in the army and her grandmother's aspiration to be a stenographer. Rees used her grandmother's journal to help guide her process. It contained family photographs of their slave ancestors, with the names of who fought in wars. Rees says that by using this it was a way of interrogating her own personal history. She used written text from the journal, a war ration book, and a photograph of her great grandmother, and each one was an inspiration for something in Mudbound.

Rees and Williams were nominated for the Academy Award for Best Adapted Screenplay for Mudbound, which made Rees the first African-American woman ever to be nominated for Best Adapted Screenplay, as well as the first African-American woman to be nominated for a writing Oscar since Suzanne de Passe was nominated for Best Original Screenplay for the 1972 film Lady Sings the Blues. The nomination of Mary J. Blige for the Academy Award for Best Supporting Actress for Mudbound made Rees the first African-American woman to direct a film for which an actor or actress was nominated for an Academy Award.

A lesser-known project of Rees' is the show Philip K. Dick's Electric Dreams, where Rees was given the chance to engage with the many emotions looming around the election of Donald Trump, and manipulate them within a sci-fi context, which is now streaming on Amazon Prime.

Rees is also attached to write and direct An Uncivil War for FilmNation. In 2018, Rees was nominated for NAACP Image Awards for Outstanding Directing and Outstanding Writing.

Rees directed The Last Thing He Wanted, based upon the novel of the same name by Joan Didion, which stars Anne Hathaway and Willem Dafoe. The film was distributed by Netflix.

Rees directed multiple episodes of the Apple TV+ war miniseries Masters of the Air.

Rees is currently set to write and direct MGM's feature film adaptation of George Gershwin's Porgy and Bess. She will be working alongside the film's producers, Irwin Winkler and Charles Winkler.

In 2019, Rees began work as writer and director for her upcoming film, The Kyd's Exquisite Follies. An original script, the film is a musical fantasy about a young musician in search of stardom. Rees is working alongside producer Cassian Elwes, with singer-songwriter Santigold set to compose.

In June 2021, Dee Rees was announced as the first African-American woman to direct a Criterion film. With the addition of her breakout film, Pariah (2011), Criterion has acknowledged its need for the addition of more female directors and director of color, and has vowed to bring more diversity to light.

== Filmmaking ==
=== Influences ===
Rees has said that she was inspired by the realistic directorial style of Cassavetes, and the cinematographer Bradford Young's organic style on the television show Friday Night Lights.

=== Method and Themes ===
As with Rees's first breakout feature, Pariah (2011), Dee Rees pulls much of her directorial influence from her own life. Rees also cites her own life experiences in the protagonist of her newest project, The Kyd's Exquisite Follies. As a Black lesbian filmmaker, Rees's intersectional identity is a huge part of her and is also unique in Hollywood. Rees has said that her dissimilarity from much of Hollywood has only amplified the importance of translating her experience into her films.

Rees's sexuality makes an appearance in her films, such as her 2011 film Pariah (2011), which tells the story of a teenage Black girl navigating the exploration of her sexuality. HBO's Bessie (2015), also written and directed by Rees, explores the sexual identity of blues singer Bessie Smith. Rees also described the protagonist of her latest project, The Kyd's Exquisite Follies as androgynous, again connecting her own experience of sexuality to her filmmaking.

Rees's identity as a Black woman is also very prevalent in her films, as Black women are extremely central in her films, such as Pariah (2011), Mudbound (2017), Bessie (2015), and a few of her upcoming projects.

Still early in her career, Rees has shown a large array of stylistic choices in her films in her exploration for her identity as a filmmaker. However, Rees has been said to spend hours on shots that end up only being a few seconds, focusing intently on visual details.

=== Collaborators ===
Spike Lee was Rees's mentor throughout her time at NYU Tisch, and the two worked on films together such as Inside Man (2006) and When The Levees Broke (2006). Lee also worked as a producer on Rees's breakout film, Pariah (2011).

Cassian Elwes, producer of Mudbound (2017), has worked with Rees on multiple projects, such as The Last Thing He Wanted (2020) and Rees's upcoming project, The Kyd's Exquisite Follies.

Lisa Cortés directed and produced the 2023 documentary film Little Richard: I am Everything, with Rees serving as an executive producer.

== Personal life ==
Rees is a lesbian, and she described Pariah as semi-autobiographical. On National Coming Out Day in 2011, in an interview with BlackEnterprise.com, Rees discussed her coming out experience. When she came out her parents weren't accepting. They sent her emails, cards, letters and Bible verses. Rees sees Pariah as semi-autobiographical because she can relate to the main concepts of the film.

Since at least 2017, Rees has been in a relationship with poet and writer Sarah M. Broom. They are now married and currently reside in Harlem.

Rees, who is of African American descent, incorporates her family's history, specifically her own grandmother's, in her 2017 film Mudbound where American violence and racism are more relevant to the lives of all citizens and a marker of each individual's identity.

== Filmography ==
Short film

Year	Title	Director	Writer
2005	Orange Bow	Yes	Yes
2007	Pariah	Yes	Yes
2009	Colonial Gods	Yes	Yes

Feature film

Year	Title	Director	Writer
2011	Pariah	Yes	Yes
2017	Mudbound	Yes	Yes
2020	The Last Thing He Wanted	Yes	Yes

Television

Year	Title	Director	Writer	Notes
2015	Bessie	Yes	Yes	TV movie
2015	Empire	Yes	No	Episode "Without a Country"
2017	When We Rise	Yes	No	2 episodes
2018	Electric Dreams	Yes	Yes	Episode "Kill All Others"
2020	Space Force	Yes	No	2 episodes
2022	Upload	Yes	No	Episode "Welcome Back, Mr. Brown"
2023	Saint X	Yes	No	Episode "A Lovely Nowhere", also executive producer
2024	Masters of the Air	Yes	Yes	Directed 2 episodes, co-wrote 1 episode
2027	Criminal	Yes	No	Directed 4 episodes, also executive producer

== Awards and nominations ==
Year	Association	Category	Work	Result
2007	Chicago Gay and Lesbian International Film Festival	Best Narrative Short	Pariah (2007)	Won
2007	Iris Prize Festival	Iris Prize	Pariah (2007)	Won
2007	Los Angeles Film Festival	Audience Award – Best Short Film	Pariah (2007)	Won
2007	Palm Springs International ShortFest	Future Filmmaker Award	Pariah (2007)	Won
2007	Palm Springs International ShortFest	Best Live Action Over 15 Minutes	Pariah (2007)	Won
2007	San Francisco International Lesbian & Gay Film Festival	Audience Award – Best Short	Pariah (2007)	Won
2007	Urbanworld Film Festival	Best Narrative Short	Pariah (2007)	Won
2008	Ashland Independent Film Festival	Best Student Film	Pariah (2007)	Won
2011	Alliance of Women Film Journalists	Best Woman Director	Pariah (2011)	Nominated
2011	Alliance of Women Film Journalists	Best Woman Screenwriter	Pariah (2011)	Nominated
2011	Black Film Critics Circle	Best Director	Pariah (2011)	Won
2011	Black Film Critics Circle	Best Original Screenplay	Pariah (2011)	Won
2011	Black Reel Awards	Best Screenplay, Original or Adapted	Pariah (2011)	Nominated
2011	Black Reel Awards	Best Director	Pariah (2011)	Nominated
2011	Gotham Awards	Breakthrough Director	Pariah (2011)	Won
2011	NAACP Image Awards	Outstanding Writing in a Motion Picture (Theatrical or Television)	Pariah (2011)	Nominated
2011	NAACP Image Awards	Outstanding Directing in a Motion Picture (Theatrical or Television)	Pariah (2011)	Nominated
2011	Independent Spirit Awards	Independent Spirit John Cassavetes Award	Pariah (2011)	Won
2011	Sundance Film Festival	Grand Jury Prize	Pariah (2011)	Nominated
2011	Women Film Critics Circle Awards	Best Woman Storyteller	Pariah (2011)	Nominated
2015	Primetime Emmy Awards	Outstanding Directing for a Miniseries, Movie or a Dramatic Special	Bessie	Nominated
2015	Primetime Emmy Awards	Outstanding Writing for a Miniseries, Movie or a Dramatic Special	Bessie	Nominated
2016	Directors Guild of America Awards	Outstanding Directing – Miniseries or TV Film	Bessie	Won
2017	Academy Awards	Best Adapted Screenplay	Mudbound	Nominated
2017	Alliance of Women Film Journalists	Best Woman Director	Mudbound	Nominated
2017	Alliance of Women Film Journalists	Best Woman Screenwriter	Mudbound	Nominated
2017	Austin Film Festival	Audience Award – Marquee Feature	Mudbound	Won
2017	Chicago Film Critics Association	Best Adapted Screenplay	Mudbound	Nominated
2017	Critics' Choice Movie Awards	Best Adapted Screenplay	Mudbound	Nominated
2017	Georgia Film Critics Association	Best Adapted Screenplay	Mudbound	Nominated
2017	Humanitas Prize	Feature – Drama	Mudbound	Won
2017	Independent Spirit Awards	Independent Spirit Robert Altman Award	Mudbound	Won
2017	NAACP Image Awards	Outstanding Writing in a Motion Picture	Mudbound	Nominated
2017	NAACP Image Awards	Outstanding Directing in a Motion Picture	Mudbound	Nominated
2017	New York Film Critics Online	Best Director	Mudbound	Won
2017	San Francisco Film Critics Circle	Best Adapted Screenplay	Mudbound	Nominated
2017	San Diego Film Critics Society	Best Adapted Screenplay	Mudbound	Runner-up
2017	Satellite Awards	Best Director	Mudbound	Nominated
2017	St. Louis Film Critics Association	Best Adapted Screenplay	Mudbound	Nominated
2017	USC Scripter Awards	Best Screenplay	Mudbound	Nominated
2017	Washington D.C. Area Film Critics Association	Best Director	Mudbound	Nominated
2017	Washington D.C. Area Film Critics Association	Best Adapted Screenplay	Mudbound	Won
2017	Women Film Critics Circle	Best Woman Storyteller	Mudbound	Nominated
2017	Women Film Critics Circle	Courage in Filmmaking	Mudbound	Won
2017	Writers Guild of America Awards	Best Adapted Screenplay	Mudbound	Nominated

== See also ==
- LGBT culture in New York City
- List of female film and television directors
- List of lesbian filmmakers
- List of LGBT-related films directed by women
- List of LGBT people from New York City
- NYC Pride March
