= Mudbound =

2008 novel by Hillary Jordan

- First US edition
- Author: Hillary Jordan
- Language: English
- Publisher: Alonquin Books (US); HarperCollins (Canada); Heinemann (UK)
- Publication date: March 2008
- Publication place: United States
- Media type: Print
- Pages: 328
- ISBN: 1-56512-569-X

Mudbound is the debut novel by American author Hillary Jordan, published in 2008. It has been translated into French, Italian, Serbian, Norwegian, Swedish, and Turkish and has sold more than 250,000 copies worldwide. The novel took Jordan seven years to write. She started it while studying for an MFA in Creative Writing from Columbia University. It was adapted as a 2017 film of the same title.

== Plot summary ==
In the winter of 1946, Henry McAllen moves his city-bred wife, Laura, from their comfortable home in Memphis, Tennessee to a remote cotton farm in the Mississippi Delta—a place she finds both foreign and frightening. While Henry works the land he loves, Laura struggles to raise their two young daughters in a crude shack with no indoor plumbing or electricity, under the eye of her hateful, racist father-in-law. When it rains, the waters rise up and swallow the bridge to town, stranding the family in a sea of mud.

As the McAllen family endures mounting hardships, two World War II veterans return to the Mississippi Delta carrying the weight of their experiences abroad. Jamie McAllen is markedly different from his elder brother Henry, more personable and empathetic, particularly toward Laura’s struggles, yet deeply affected by the trauma of combat. Ronsel Jackson, the eldest son of Black tenant farmers working the McAllen land, returns home decorated and respected for his service in Europe. However, his sense of dignity and accomplishment soon confronts the entrenched racial prejudice of his own society. The evolving bond between the two men, shaped by shared wartime experiences yet divided by the realities of the American South, sets in motion a chain of events that ultimately leads to tragedy.

== Awards ==
- Won the 2006 Bellwether Prize for fiction, founded by author Barbara Kingsolver and awarded biennially to an unpublished work of fiction that addresses issues of social justice.
- Named as the 2008 'Fiction book of the Year' by the NAIBA (New Atlantic Independent Booksellers Association)
- Won an Alex Award from the American Library Association in 2009
- Long-listed for the 2010 International Dublin Literary Award
- In addition, this was one of twelve New Voices for 2008 chosen by Waterstones UK, ranked as one of the Top Ten Debut Novels of the Decade by Paste Magazine, a Barnes & Noble Discover Great New Writers pick, a Borders Original Voices selection, a Book Sense pick, a Richard & Judy New Writers Book Of The Month, and one of Indie Next's top ten reading group suggestions for 2009.
- Won 2009 Audie Award for Multi-Voiced Performance of the audio version of Mudbound.

== Reception ==
Reviews were generally positive :

- The San Antonio Express-News says "Jordan picks at the scabs of racial inequality that will perhaps never fully heal and brings just enough heartbreak to this intimate, universal tale, just enough suspense, to leave us contemplating how the lives and motives of these vivid characters might have been different."
- Publishers Weekly concludes "Jordan convincingly inhabits each of her narrators, though some descriptive passages can be overly florid, and the denouement is a bit maudlin. But these are minor blemishes on a superbly rendered depiction of the fury and terror wrought by racism."
- Emma Hagestadt in The Independent wrote "Adultery and alcoholism, rough justice and racism may be the stock in trade of any number of Southern novels, but Jordan neatly sidesteps pat endings and solutions. The novel's alternating narrative voices work well. Only Ronsel's wartime flashbacks, which are uneasily shoe-horned into the homespun domestic drama, feel forced. The flat landscape of the Delta and its sudden electric storms provide a suitably gothic backdrop for the shocking denouement to come. The winner of Barbara Kingsolver's Bellwether Prize for a novel "promoting social responsibility", Hillary Jordan is happily a writer who puts her duty to entertain first".
- Ron Charles in The Washington Post said Jordan "builds a compelling family tragedy, a confluence of romantic attraction and racial hatred that eventually falls like an avalanche. Indeed, the last third of the book is downright breathless. But, unfortunately, all of these narrators lack the essential quality of incompleteness. They're burdened with such thorough self-knowledge that the book has no room for dramatic irony. "What we cannot speak," Jamie thinks toward the end, "we say in silence," which is odd coming from a character who has already told us everything, including painful things we should have been allowed to infer. Jordan has plenty of talent to compose an engaging story, and when she tries to do less, she may very well end up doing more."

== Sequel ==
Jordan is writing a sequel with the working title FATHERLANDS. In MUDBOUND, black American GI Ronsel Jackson has a love affair with a white German woman during the American occupation of Bavaria; when he ships out for home, neither know that she is pregnant. The new novel centers on their illegitimate son, Franz, who is raised in Germany by his impoverished mother. As one of the "Mischlingskinder," mixed-race children who were the products of such controversial unions, he grows up feeling like an outsider who doesn't belong. When he is 7, his mother is forced to put him into foster care. At 18, Franz sets off for America, determined to find the father he never knew. There, he is caught up in the turmoil of the Civil Rights struggle and forced to navigate a complex tangle of race, history and politics in his search for self-realization.
