= Hillary Jordan =

American novelist

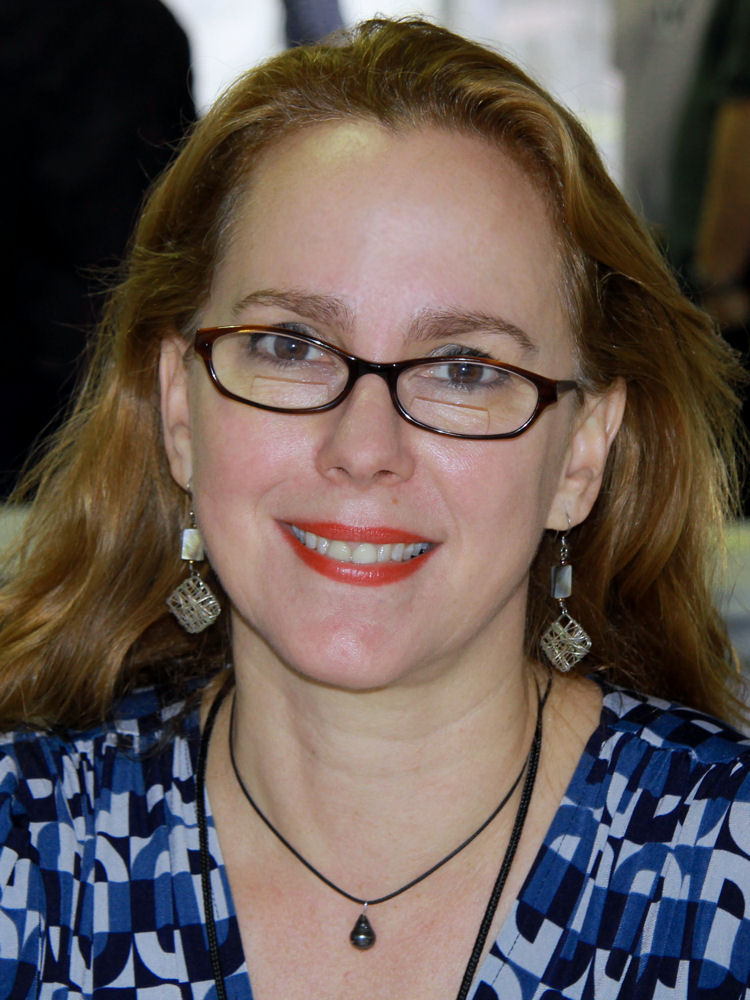
- Jordan at the 2011 Texas Book Festival
- Education: Wellesley College (BA); Columbia University (MFA)
- Occupations: Author; screenwriter
- Writing career
- Notable awards: Bellwether Prize (2006); Alex Award (2009)
- Website: www.hillaryjordan.com

Hillary Jordan is an American novelist. She grew up in Dallas and Muskogee, Oklahoma and now lives in Brooklyn. She received a BA from Wellesley College and an MFA in Creative Writing from Columbia University. and has written two novels: Mudbound (2008) and When She Woke (2011), and a short story called "Aftermirth". She is currently working on a sequel to Mudbound. She is a 2009 recipient of the Alex Awards.

== Mudbound ==
Mudbound confronts racism on a cotton farm on the Mississippi Delta in 1946. It won the 2006 Bellwether Prize for fiction, awarded biennially to an unpublished work of fiction that addresses issues of social justice, and a 2009 Alex Award from the American Library Association. It was the 2008 NAIBA (New Atlantic Independent Booksellers Association) Fiction Book of the Year and was named one of the Top Ten Debut Novels of the Decade by "Paste" Magazine. An award-winning film adaptation was released in 2017.

== When She Woke ==
When She Woke is a dystopian reimagining of Nathaniel Hawthorne's The Scarlet Letter, set in a future theocratic America where criminals are punished by being "chromed" – having their skin color genetically altered to fit their crime – and released into the general population to survive as best they can.

== Works ==
- Mudbound: a Novel (2008)
- When She Woke: a Novel (2011)
- Anonymous Sex (2022, editor; with Cheryl Lu-Lien Tan)
