= Patriot Party (1970s) =

Minor American political party

- Founded: 1970; 56 years ago
- Dissolved: Mid-1970s
- Preceded by: Young Patriots Organization
- Headquarters: Chicago
- Ideology: Revolutionary socialism; Left-wing nationalism; Anti-racism; Anti-capitalism
- Political position: Far-left

Party flag

The Patriot Party was a socialist organization of the early 1970s in the United States that organized poor, rural whites in the Appalachian South and Pacific Northwest. The party was formed after a split with the Young Patriots Organization. The YPO's membership was drawn from street gangs of Appalachian whites in the Uptown neighborhood of Chicago, Illinois; it became politicized after working with the Young Lords, a Puerto Rican activist group, and the African-American Black Panther Party.

== Founding ==
The Patriot Party was founded in 1970 after infighting among members of the leftist Young Patriots Organization in Chicago. The group sought to improve the condition of disadvantaged whites, particularly recent immigrants, drug-users, the unemployed, welfare-recipients, blue-collar workers, and "dislocated hillbillies" who had left Appalachia.

The Patriot Party was a member of the original Rainbow Coalition, formed by Fred Hampton of the Black Panther Party and others to create a broad-based, multi-racial political coalition. It formed after the United Front Against Fascism conference held in Oakland, California, in 1969. The coalition included the Young Lords, the Brown Berets and I Wor Kuen. Hampton's intention was to have multi-ethnic gangs working together to accomplish peaceful solutions, rather than battling each other.

== Strategies ==
The Patriot Party borrowed strategies of community organizing from the Black Panthers. For instance, they established a Free Breakfast for Children program. They established "liberation schools" to teach their ideology to children. The Eugene, Oregon, chapter, location of the University of Oregon, garnered much community support with its "Free Lumber" program. At this time in the Northwest, some poor people still relied on wood-stoves for cooking and heating, and cheap wood was hard to come by. Most members of the Eugene chapter were of Okie heritage (descended from poor whites who had migrated from Oklahoma, Texas, Kansas, and Missouri in the Great Depression era).

The Patriot Party believed that whites would abandon racist beliefs after identifying the capitalist system as their true enemy.

=== Use of the Confederate flag ===
Despite the Confederate flag's association with white supremacism, the Patriot Party used it as a symbol. In addition to easy access at military surplus stores, the flag was used, according to Amy Sonnie and James Tracy, "as a symbol of southern poor people's revolt against the owning class". Buttons with the slogan "Resurrect John Brown" – a reference to the avowed abolitionist – were also commonly used. Pamphlets contained slogans such as "The South will rise again, only this time with the North and all the oppressed people of the world."

== Downfall and legacy ==
In 1970, the Federal Bureau of Investigation (FBI) arrested the entire central committee of the Patriot Party and charged them with various felonies. They later dropped the charges, but, by the mid-1970s, the FBI's COINTELPRO program had effectively suppressed the organization.

The group was also strongly opposed by far-right white militias.

In 1982, the civil rights activist Jesse Jackson adopted the name of "Rainbow Coalition" for organizing multi-ethnic groups to support and vote for liberal (generally Democratic) candidates for public office, in order to strengthen minority voices by acting in collaboration.
