= RPCC =

RPCC can refer to:

- Rajasthan Pradesh Congress Committee, state wing of an Indian political party in Rajasthan.
- River Parishes Community College, a community college located in Louisiana, U.S.A.
- Revolutionary People's Constitutional Convention, a conference organized by the Black Panther Party (BPP).
