= People's Law Office =

Law firm in Chicago, Illinois

People's Law Office (PLO) is a law office in Chicago, Illinois, which focuses on public interest law, representing clients believed to have been the subject of attacks by governmental officials and agencies. It was founded in 1969. Clients have included political activists, people who have been wrongfully arrested and imprisoned, or subjected to excessive force; and criminal defendants.

== History ==
In the aftermath of the 1968 Democratic National Convention held in Chicago, where hundreds of people were arrested and criminally charged during massive protests, a group of lawyers decided they wanted to work in and with the movement for social and political change. They wanted to set up a law firm to be part of that movement, with a workload based on political events and involvements, rather than the usual constraints of a law firm. PLO was organized as a non-hierarchical collective. All attorneys who work at the office for more than a few years become equal partners, having an equal say in decisions about running the office and receiving equal pay, and consulting with other attorneys and office staff about office decisions.

== Legal work ==
=== Black Panther Party ===
In its early years, PLO was notable for its representation of the Black Panther Party (BPP), and in particular for representing Fred Hampton, one of the leaders of the BPP in Chicago. Hampton and another BPP leader, Mark Clark, were killed in a police raid of Hampton's apartment in the early morning hours of December 4, 1969. PLO lawyers took the lead in investigating the case and exposing as a lie the police story of a shoot-out with people in the apartment. PLO lawyers were able to demonstrate that the police fired all but one of the shots exchanged. Further, they publicly established that the police had conducted a "shoot-in" and murder.

Subsequently, PLO and associated lawyers filed a civil suit related to the raid. Their investigation and the trial revealed that the federal government was involved in the raid. It was part of the FBI COINTELPRO program designed to destroy the Panthers. Hampton's bodyguard was documented as an FBI informant. PLO lawyers Jeffrey Haas and G. Flint Taylor, together with attorney James D. Montgomery, served as trial counsel for the 18-month trial. It was presided over Judge Sam Perry. The trial ended with a hung jury, but the judge entered judgment in favor of the government defendants. This decision was reversed on appeal, with the federal appeals court finding that there was substantial evidence of a conspiracy between the FBI, Cook County State's Attorney Edward Hanrahan and the police to murder Hampton and destroy the Panthers. After the case was sent back to the trial court and a new judge, it was settled in the early 1980s for a then-unprecedented $1.85 million.

=== Attica Prison rebellion ===
PLO lawyers took the lead in the legal representation of the Attica prisoners following the 1971 Attica Prison rebellion in upstate New York. Following the suppression of the uprising and the killing by law enforcement of 39 guards and prisoners, the PLO lawyers were some of the first outsiders to enter the prison. They worked on several cases in which prisoners sought relief from maltreatment and abuse by guards following the riot.

When 62 prisoners were charged with crimes arising from the rebellion, but no government officials were charged in the 39 deaths or alleged abuse of prisoners following suppression of the rising, several PLO lawyers relocated to Buffalo, New York, the site of the criminal trials. They worked with other lawyers, law students and paralegals to defend the prisoners. Eventually, almost all the prisoners were acquitted, or the charges against them were dismissed. In 1976, New York Governor Hugh Carey pardoned all of the prisoners who had pleaded guilty in return for reduced sentences. He commuted the sentences of the two prisoners who had been convicted at trial. PLO lawyers joined with other attorneys to file a civil case for damages on behalf of the prisoners and against the state correctional system. This case continued for years, and eventually resulted in a settlement for the prisoners of $12 million.

=== Representing prisoners ===
PLO also represented prisoners in several other prisons in the 1970s, challenging the segregation of prisoner organizers, fighting against prison behavior modification units, later named "control units;" and defending jailhouse lawyers. After an uprising at Pontiac prison in 1978, PLO lawyers helped coordinate the legal defense of the prisoners charged with crimes. Seventeen of the prisoners were charged in capital cases that were subject to the death penalty. All the prisoners charged with capital crimes were eventually acquitted or the charges were dropped. PLO also litigated to improve medical care in prisons. In Green v. Carlson, PLO sued federal Bureau of Prisons officials for the death of a prisoner at Terre Haute Federal Prison and eventually obtained a ruling from the United States Supreme Court upholding the right of a prisoner to bring a cruel and unusual punishment claim for damages against federal officials. And in Cleavinger v. Saxner, PLO lawyers represented two prisoners who had been disciplined for petitioning for the improvement of medical care at Terre Haute prison. The U.S. Supreme Court held that prison officials were properly held liable in money damages for this wrongful discipline. PLO continues to work with prisoners today and is currently involved with litigation involving the lack of medical care for prisoners, and the failure to effectively prevent jail suicide.

=== Support for the Puerto Rican independence movement ===
In the 1970s the office agreed to represent Puerto Rican defendants who were part of the independence movement: Oscar Collazo, Andrés Figueroa Cordero, Irvin Flores, Lolita Lebrón, and Rafael Cancel Miranda. Collazo had been convicted in the attempted assassination of President Truman in 1950. The other four had been convicted in the United States Capitol shooting incident (1954). (Cordero was released from prison in 1978 because he had terminal cancer). In 1979, the sentences of the four remaining in prison were unconditionally commuted and they were released.

The office also represented other militant proponents of Puerto Rican independence, fighting subpoenas issued against supporters of Fuerzas Armadas de Liberación Nacional (FALN) fugitives and other pro-independence activists. In 1980, when 11 alleged FALN members were arrested and charged with numerous criminal offenses including seditious conspiracy, they refused to recognize the authority of the U.S. courts. They asserted they were prisoners of war rather than criminal defendants. PLO lawyers prepared ing a petition to the U.N. Decolonization Committee and the Human Rights Commission in support of their position.

When other alleged FALN members were charged with seditious conspiracy in 1985, PLO lawyers helped defend them. All of these defendants were convicted and most sentenced to lengthy prison terms. in 1985, PLO began to represent an alleged member of the Macheteros, a clandestine pro- Puerto Rican independence organization, who was charged, with others, in Hartford, Connecticut with conspiracy to rob Wells Fargo of $7.3 million.

Throughout the 1980s and 1990s, the office monitored the prison conditions of the Puerto Rican political prisoners. They spoke and wrote about violations of their human rights, participating in meetings with the Department of Justice and the White House, advocating for their release, and coordinating with the campaign for their release. In 1999, in response to this movement, President Bill Clinton arranged gradual release of most of the prisoners after they served more time. Oscar López Rivera, did not accept the release offer, as it required him to serve an additional ten years and did not include all of the prisoners. Those prisoners not included in President Clinton's offer were released in 2009 and 2010. Before leaving office in 2017 President Obama commuted the sentence of Oscar Rivera, allowing him to be released on May 17, 2017. Since his release, Oscar Rivera has made several public appearances throughout Puerto Rico and the United States. The decision of the New York Puerto Rican Day parade to honor Rivera generated controversy, with some sponsors withdrawing their support. In response, Rivera withdrew as an honoree, although he did march in the parade.

=== Representing demonstrators and activists ===
From its inception, PLO has represented a wide range of political demonstrators and activists in the United States. In the 1970s this included the BPP, the Young Lords, Young Patriots, Students for a Democratic Society (SDS), the anti-Vietnam-war movement, militant community organizations such as Concerned Citizens of Lincoln Park and the Latin American Defense Organization, Iranian students demonstrating in the 1970s against the Shah and his secret police (SAVAK), Palestinian students protesting against Israeli Day, Dennis Brutus, a South African poet and political activist who the government was attempting to deport, demonstrators against U.S. intervention in Central America, activists arrested for civil disobedience and sanctuary networking, anti-intervention and anti-nuclear demonstrators who were alleged to have trespassed at the Great Lakes Naval Training Center, women who were arrested on International Women's Day for chaining themselves to the Playboy Club, demonstrators arrested at protests against the Rock Island Arsenal, Pledge of Resistance demonstrators, Armed Forces Day demonstrators, Hiroshima Day demonstrators, and Sanctuary supporters, anti-apartheid protestors, toxic waste demonstrators, homeless activists, anti-CIA protesters, anti-Zionist protesters, and demonstrators who protested discriminatory Chicago Transit Authority hiring practices. In the 1980s PLO continued this work, joining in protests against U.S. involvement in Central America, South Africa, and the Middle East. It represented activists who were arrested for direct action and civil disobedience, as well as activists from many different organizations, including student groups, the Emergency Clinic Defense Coalition (a pro-choice direct action group), Homeless on the Move for Equality, Greenpeace, Queer Nation, ADAPT (a disability rights activist group), activists protesting the lack of Latino hiring at the Chicago Transit Authority, and ACORN. The office also defended the Pledge of Resistance and Queer Nation against injunctions brought against them.

In the 1990s PLO worked with AIDS Coalition to Unleash Power (ACT UP), coordinating legal observers at demonstrations and providing representation in criminal and civil courts. At a demonstration against the American Medical Association in June, 1991, 27 ACT UP members were arrested and brutalized by Chicago police. PLO participated in the criminal defense where most charges were thrown out, and then filed and successfully litigated civil rights complaints on behalf of several of the demonstrators.

In the 21st century, PLO represented more than 800 people who were arrested or detained at a 2003 demonstration against the start of the Iraq war (war on terror). PLO lawyers and other National Lawyers Guild attorneys filed a class action case against the City of Chicago and its employees, asserting that the arrests were unconstitutional. Although a judge dismissed the case because the march had failed to get a permit, an appeals court reversed and held that the City could be liable because police had failed to give marchers orders to disperse prior to arresting them. The case was settled, with the City agreeing to pay $6.2 million to the plaintiffs.

People's law Office is involved in defending members of the Occupy movement and demonstrators arrested during the May, 2012, protests at the Chicago NATO summit.

=== Opposition to the death penalty ===
People's Law Office has worked on several capital cases and gained reversal of the death penalty. They havce also pursued cases exposing judicial corruption. These have included a case which changed Illinois law as to who could be sentenced to death. In another case, a corrupt judge agreed to a bribe by defendants, but returned it after learning of an FBI investigation of him and sentenced the defendants to death. In another case, PLO established that the same judge treated defendants who did not pay him bribes exceptionally harshly and had their cases remanded for resentencing. In an Indiana case, PLO gained reversal of the death penalty by demonstrating that African Americans were systematically excluded from the jury pool that sentenced the defendant to death. PLO also represented several prisoners in successfully defending former Governor Ryan's commutation of the death sentences of all prisoners on Illinois' death row, Its staff were active in the movement to abolish the death penalty in Illinois.

=== False arrests and convictions ===
PLO has represented and obtained money damages for many clients who were falsely arrested or convicted, including Kenny Adams, one of the Ford Heights Four. These four innocent men spent a total of 65 years in prison for a crime which they did not commit; they eventually obtained a record $36 million settlement. the 8-year-old boy who was notoriously charged with the murder of Ryan Harris on the basis of a confession he allegedly gave to detectives, where fuller investigation established that there was semen on the body which came from a repeat sexual offender; Miguel Castillo, convicted of murder, where PLO was able to establish he was in jail on another charge at the time of the killing; Ronald Jones, who was sentenced to death where DNA subsequently established his innocence; Larry Mayes, an Indiana man imprisoned for almost 20 years for rape where DNA showed he was not the rapist, and investigation showed that the eyewitness had been secretly hypnotized; Jerry Miller, who served almost 25 years before DNA proved that another man, who had subsequently committed several other assaults, was the perpetrator of a rape; and George Jones, accused of rape and murder, where PLO lawyers established the existence of secret Chicago Police Department files containing exculpatory information, which in this case contained the name of the likely real killer.

=== Police brutality and torture ===
PLO attorneys have litigated many cases in which victims were physically abused by the police or other government agents. In 1988 the office undertook the representation of Andrew Wilson, who was beaten, burned and electroshocked by several detectives, including the commanding officer of the Violent Crimes Unit, Lt. Jon Burge, after being arrested for killing two police officers. In the Wilson case, PLO generated substantial evidence that Burge and his detectives routinely tortured criminal defendants to obtain confessions. Most of the evidence was barred from the trial by a hostile judge, and after two trials, the plaintiff lost. On appeal, however, PLO was able to obtain a reversal of the verdict, and after the case was sent back to the trial court it settled for over a million dollars. PLO continued to press the City of Chicago and its police department to discipline Burge and the other officers involved in the torture, and after significant public pressure, including many demonstrations at the City Council and the Police Board, internal police department charges were brought against Burge and two other detectives, and Burge was eventually fired. PLO continued to push for Burge to be criminally charged. He was accused of lying under oath for denying that he was aware of torture in his department. Burge was convicted and is serving time in federal prison. PLO's work in exposing torture led to their representation of several other people who had been convicted after giving coerced confessions, obtaining both the reversals of their convictions and money damages for their false imprisonment. In addition to these cases, PLO has represented many clients who have been subjected to excessive force by police officers in cases that are not tied to false convictions.

=== LGBTQ Rights ===
In recent years, PLO has been representing more and more people from LGBTQ communities, who have been targeted or punished in the criminal legal system because of their gender identity or sexual orientation. This has included representing a lesbian who was sentenced to death for murder, where the focus of the prosecution sentencing argument was that she was a "hard core lesbian"; representing several transgender and gender non-conforming people who have been illegally and unconstitutionally strip searched, harassed or discriminated against while in police custody; and defending gay men who are falsely accused of engaging in public sex acts. PLO is also involved in efforts to force police departments to change their policies, or lack of policies, concerning the treatment of transgender or gender non-conforming people while in police custody. Joey Mogul, a People's Law Office attorney, recently co-authored a book exploring the experiences of sexually non-conforming people in the criminal justice system.

== Supreme Court litigation ==
People's Law Office has argued four cases before the United States Supreme Court:

- Buckley v. Fitzsimmons determined that prosecutors are not entitled to absolute immunity for investigative activities, and held that they could be sued for damages for wrongly prosecuting Stephen Buckley for the murder of Jeanine Nicarico;
- Soldal v. Cook County held that the Fourth Amendment protects property as well as privacy, and that government participation in an illegal eviction can amount to a violation of tenants' constitutional rights;
- Cleavinger v. Saxner established that members of prison disciplinary committees are entitled only to qualified, rather than absolute, immunity from lawsuits when imposing discipline on prisoners, and upheld a jury verdict for plaintiff David Saxner;
- Green v. Carlson held that federal prisoners have a right to sue under the Eighth Amendment for failure of prisons to provide adequate medical treatment.

PLO lawyers have argued several cases in the Illinois Supreme Court, and the Indiana Supreme Court.

== People's Law Office and the National Lawyers Guild ==
PLO members have been active at the local and national levels of the National Lawyers Guild (NLG), founded in 1937 during the Great Depression. This association lawyers and jurists has worked to emphasize human rights over property rights. PLO has worked on such issues as the struggle for independence of the Palestinian and Puerto Rican peoples, the Attica prisoners, providing legal support for progressive groups, and fighting against government brutality and repression.

In addition, PLO members have had a lead role in founding and publishing the Police Misconduct and Civil Rights Law Report, a newsletter containing articles on current issues in police misconduct and civil rights litigation. It helped found the National Police Accountability Project (NPAP) intended to help end police abuse of authority.
