= G. Flint Taylor =

American human rights and civil rights attorney (born 1946)

- Born: Farmington, Maine
- Occupation: Attorney
- Years active: 46
- Known for: Advocacy for people alleging forced confessions from police torture

G. Flint Taylor (born April 16, 1946) is an American human rights and civil rights attorney based in Chicago, Illinois, who has litigated many high-profile police brutality, government misconduct and death penalty cases. Taylor has pursued public interest law to take on allegations of corrupt police tactics and wrongful convictions in the city of Chicago and elsewhere. Taylor was part of a team of negotiators in the 2015 landmark decision by the City of Chicago to award reparations to the survivors of police torture, becoming the first municipal government to do so.

== Early life and family ==
George Flint Taylor Jr. was born in Farmington, Maine, and was named after his paternal great-grandfather George Flint, a Maine state senator. Taylor's father was a direct descendant of several English Pilgrims who came to Plymouth, Massachusetts, on the Mayflower in 1620. Taylor graduated from Westborough (MA) High School, where he won ten varsity letters in basketball, football, and baseball. He graduated from Brown University with an American History degree in 1968, and from the Northwestern University School of Law in 1972.

== Career ==
During his second year in law school at Northwestern, Taylor began to work with a group of lawyers who were representing counterculture political groups, including the Black Panther Party (BPP), the Young Lords Organization, Rising Up Angry and the Weathermen. In August 1969, these lawyers, together with two other law students, established the People's Law Office (PLO) on the north side of Chicago.

=== Fred Hampton Black Panther case ===
One of Taylor's most notable cases involved litigation over the death of Black Panther Party Chairman Fred Hampton, killed in what was reported by police as a shootout at his apartment. Taylor and his colleagues at the People's Law Office filed a civil rights suit following a raid on December 4, 1969, conducted by fourteen Chicago police officers, at the direction of Cook County State's Attorney Edward Hanrahan. The officers entered an apartment on Chicago's West Side, shooting and killing Hampton and Black Panther activist Mark Clark, and wounding four others. Taylor, together with several other People's Law Office lawyers and staff, were called to the apartment by survivors. For the next ten days they collected evidence at the scene.

This evidence was ultimately turned over to FBI ballistics expert Robert Zimmers, who determined that of the more than 90 bullets fired, all but one were fired by the police. Thousands of Chicago citizens toured the apartment while the evidence was being taken. One older black woman observed that it "wasn't nothing but a Northern lynching."

In 1970, Taylor and his colleagues sued a wide range of police and prosecutorial officials for $47.7 million in damages on behalf of the families of Hampton, Clark, and the survivors of the police raid. Upon discovering that the FBI also was involved in the raid, under J. Edgar Hoover's COINTELPRO program, they later named several FBI officials as defendants. Taylor worked in cooperation with U. S. Senator Frank Church's (D-Idaho) Committee on Intelligence. The Select Committee to Study Governmental Operations concluded in its 1976 report that the BPP raid by the Chicago police was part of a nationwide FBI program called COINTELPRO that was designed to "destroy" the Black Panther movement.

In January 1976, the BPP civil lawsuits went to trial with Taylor and law partner Jeffrey Haas as trial counsel. The trial lasted for 18 months, longer than any previous federal court case. During the trial, it was established that the FBI had not turned over 200 volumes of Black Panther documents to defense counsel. Both Taylor and Haas were jailed for contempt when they protested what they claimed were unfair rulings by federal Judge Joseph Sam Perry. At the end of the trial, Judge Perry dismissed the case. Taylor, Haas and colleague Dennis Cunningham appealed to the Seventh Circuit Court of Appeals.

In April 1979, the Court of Appeals, in a 2-1 decision, overturned the dismissal, holding that the evidence introduced at trial supported the allegations of a conspiracy among the Chicago police, the Cook County State's Attorney, and the FBI against the Black Panther members. The appeals court further ruled that the government should be sanctioned for suppression of the FBI documents and that Taylor and Haas were wrongfully cited for contempt. In 1982, the case was settled for $1.85 million. It was never determined who fired the first shot at the apartment.

=== Greensboro, North Carolina case ===
On November 3, 1979, members of the Ku Klux Klan and American Nazi Party, with a former FBI and police informant, Edward Dawson, in the lead car, drove into Greensboro, North Carolina. In the absence of police officers, they fired into a crowd of anti-Klan demonstrators, fatally shooting five and wounding ten others. The demonstrators had gathered at a "Death to the Klan" march, sponsored by the Communist Workers Party, which had been organizing among mostly black workers in the textile mills. Six men were charged with murder in the state's criminal trial; three of these and another six were charged with criminal civil rights violations in a federal trial. All the Klansmen and Nazi defendants were acquitted in the two separate trials by independent all-white juries.

In 1980, a volunteer legal team had filed a civil rights damages case alleging a conspiracy among the Klansmen, Nazis, the Greensboro police, and the FBI in failing to protect protesters when they had knowledge of likely Klan violence. Taylor was one of the lead trial counsel. In the spring of 1985, during a ten-week trial in federal district court in Winston-Salem, North Carolina, Taylor and his co-counsel Lewis Pitts and Carolyn MacAllister questioned scores of Nazi, Klan, FBI, police and informant witnesses. At one point in the trial, Taylor interrogated reputed Nazi leader Roland Wayne Wood about five miniature skulls pinned to his lapel. The jury of five whites and one African American was at first deadlocked, then they returned a compromise verdict against some of the defendants. The verdict was cited by the plaintiff legal team as an "historic victory" because it was the first time that anyone had been held responsible for the killings in the Greensboro Massacre.

=== Chicago Police torture cases ===
In 1987, Taylor, Haas and law partner John Stainthorp agreed to represent death row prisoner Andrew Wilson in his pro se civil rights suit. Wilson alleged that he was tortured with electric shock by Area 2 Chicago Police Commander Jon Burge and forced to confess to the 1982 murder of two Chicago police officers, for which he was convicted and sentenced to death. In 1989, Wilson's case went to trial with Taylor, Stainthorp and Haas as trial counsel.

During the trial, Taylor received a series of anonymous letters from a person claiming to be an officer who worked with Burge. The anonymous letters asserted that what happened to Wilson was part of a decades-old pattern of police torture, led by Burge, that victimized African-American detainees. These letters led Taylor and his colleagues to other alleged torture victims, but federal court trial Judge Brian Barnett Duff did not permit the jury to hear this evidence; he held Taylor and Haas in contempt of court. After eight weeks of trial, the jury was unable to reach a verdict. The case was retried later in the year.

After a second trial that lasted eight weeks, an all-white jury found Burge not guilty, but the Seventh Circuit Court of Appeals reversed the verdict. The Seventh Circuit Court of Appeals held that District Court Judge Brian Barnett Duff abused his discretion in allowing the Defendants to delve into the gory details of Wilson's past crimes against police officers despite the fact that it was undisputed that Wilson was convicted of those crimes. In a written opinion by Judge Richard Posner (which was joined by noted Judge Frank Easterbrook), the appellate court heavily criticized Judge Brian Barnett Duff's evidentiary rulings saying,

"...a district judge has broad discretion in ruling on the admissibility of evidence, especially when balancing intangibles [however], we cannot avoid concluding that the limits of permissible judgment were exceeded. A mass of inflammatory evidence having little or no relevance to the issues in this trial (as distinct from Wilson's murder trial) was admitted, and the defendants' counsel was permitted to harp on it to the jury and thus turn the trial of the defendants into a trial of the plaintiff.".

In short, the Appellate Court found that Federal District Judge Duff's rulings were so unfairly prejudicial to Wilson, and stacked the deck against him so much that Wilson had to be granted a new trial. The appellate court reiterated multiple times in its opinion that it was Defendant's alleged torturing of prisoners that was at issue, not Taylor's crimes. Eventually Wilson was awarded more than $1 million in attorney's fees and $100,000 in damages; the $100,000 went to the estate of the officers who were killed in 1982.

Over the years, more than 100 men had said they were tortured on the South Side under Burge's watch. In addition to suffering electric shock, they told stories of police putting a loaded gun in their mouth or a typewriter cover over their head to make them believe they would die. On the basis of newly discovered evidence, the Chicago Police Department in 1993 fired Burge, having found that there was "systematic" torture at Area 2. In 1994, Taylor, together with law partners Joey Mogul and Tim Lohraff, began representing death row inmate Aaron Patterson, who alleged that he was tortured by Burge and his men into a coerced confession.

In 2000, the Illinois Supreme Court ruled that Patterson was entitled to a new hearing on his claims of torture. In 2003 Illinois Governor George Ryan pardoned Patterson and three others on Illinois' death row, saying their torture claims proved the criminal justice system was "terribly broken." He had already conducted a three-year review of the justice system and was disturbed to learn that 13 men on death row had been exonerated as innocent. In 2000 he declared a moratorium on use of the death penalty.

Taylor, with partners Mogul and Ben Elson, also represented police torture victims Darrell Cannon and Michael Tillman, winning Cannon's freedom in 2007 and Tillman's in 2010.

In 2011, Taylor and his colleagues obtained the first judicial decision holding former Chicago Mayor Richard M. Daley as a defendant in a civil police torture case, alleging a citywide conspiracy to cover it up.

Taylor and his associates played a significant role in the decades-long campaign to obtain criminal charges against Burge. In October 2008, Burge was indicted by a federal grand jury for lying in a civil case about torturing suspects. He was convicted in June 2010, and subsequently sentenced to 4½ years in federal prison. Burge was released from prison on October 2, 2014, to spend the remainder of his sentence at a halfway house near his Tampa, Florida, retirement home. Burge will still collect his Chicago police pension.

The day Burge was released from prison, Taylor, Mogul, colleagues from the Chicago Torture Justice Memorials (CTJM), and survivors of Chicago police torture, joined by 26 aldermen, urged the Chicago City Council to pass an ordinance to earmark $20 million in reparations to the victims of police torture in Area 2. The ordinance was conceived by noted Chicago civil rights attorney Standish Willis and drafted by CTJM co-founder Joey Mogul. It was the product of years of political organizing by grassroots organizations that included CTJM and Black People Against Police Torture. "With a majority of the aldermen on board for this ordinance, the powers that be in this city should take it seriously," Taylor told reporters. "There's definitely a political downside for the mayor (Rahm Emanuel) if he doesn't step forward and step forward quickly."

=== Historic reparations award ===
For more than a year, the reparations ordinance, which had been introduced by Aldermen co-sponsors Joe Moreno and Howard Brookins Jr. in October 2013, had been stalled in the Chicago City Council. Political pressure began to build during the run-up to the 2015 Chicago mayoral primary. Mayor Rahm Emanuel was seeking a second term in office and faced four challengers, two of whom were African American. CTJM, Amnesty International, and other activists collected 40,000 signatures, which they delivered to Emanuel's office in December 2014, suggesting growing public support for the proposal. After a 2015 Valentine's Day Rally that attracted hundreds of supporters, a team of negotiators that included Taylor, fellow People's Law partner Mogul, and advocates from CTJM, and Amnesty International began negotiations with the city of Chicago's corporation counsel, Stephen Patton, on the terms of the reparations ordinance. The city's initial offer did not include any direct payments to victims or their families, a demand on which the team of negotiators refused to yield. Talks at first were strained. Various aldermen and staffers from the mayor's office and the law department got involved, and a compromise that would include financial payments to living victims, but not to the families of those who had died, was eventually brokered.

In May 2015, a month after Emanuel was re-elected, Chicago aldermen unanimously approved a 5.5-million-dollar reparations package, agreeing to compensate the approximately 60 living victims with valid claims of torture while in police custody during Burge's command, each to receive up to $100,000. Additionally, the living survivors, their immediate families, and the immediate families of the deceased torture victims would all gain access to services, including psychological counseling and free tuition to the City Colleges of Chicago. The aldermen also approved building a public memorial to the deceased victims. They also established a requirement that Chicago public schools teach students in the eighth and tenth grades about the Burge legacy of police brutality. At the May Council meeting, in the presence of more than a dozen survivors, Emanuel offered an official apology on behalf of the City of Chicago, and the aldermen stood and applauded them. Taylor stated in an interview that the "non-financial reparations make it truly historic."

Darrell Cannon, one of those who will receive reparations for his coerced confession under torture, spent 24 years in prison, including nine years in the Illinois supermax prison, Tamms Correctional Center. He told The Guardian that the reparations package "is something that sets a precedent that has never been done in the history of America. Reparations given to black men tortured by some white detectives. It's historic."

On Chicago becoming the first city to offer restitution to victims of police misconduct, Taylor articulated his hope that this will be a "beacon for other cities here and across the world for dealing with racist police brutality so prevalent in the past in this country."

==== Honors and awards ====
In March 2002, Chicago magazine named Taylor to its list of the city's "30 Tough Lawyers".

Other awards include:

- 2014

IVI-IPO Legal Eagle Award, given annually to lawyers who have advanced the cause of justice.

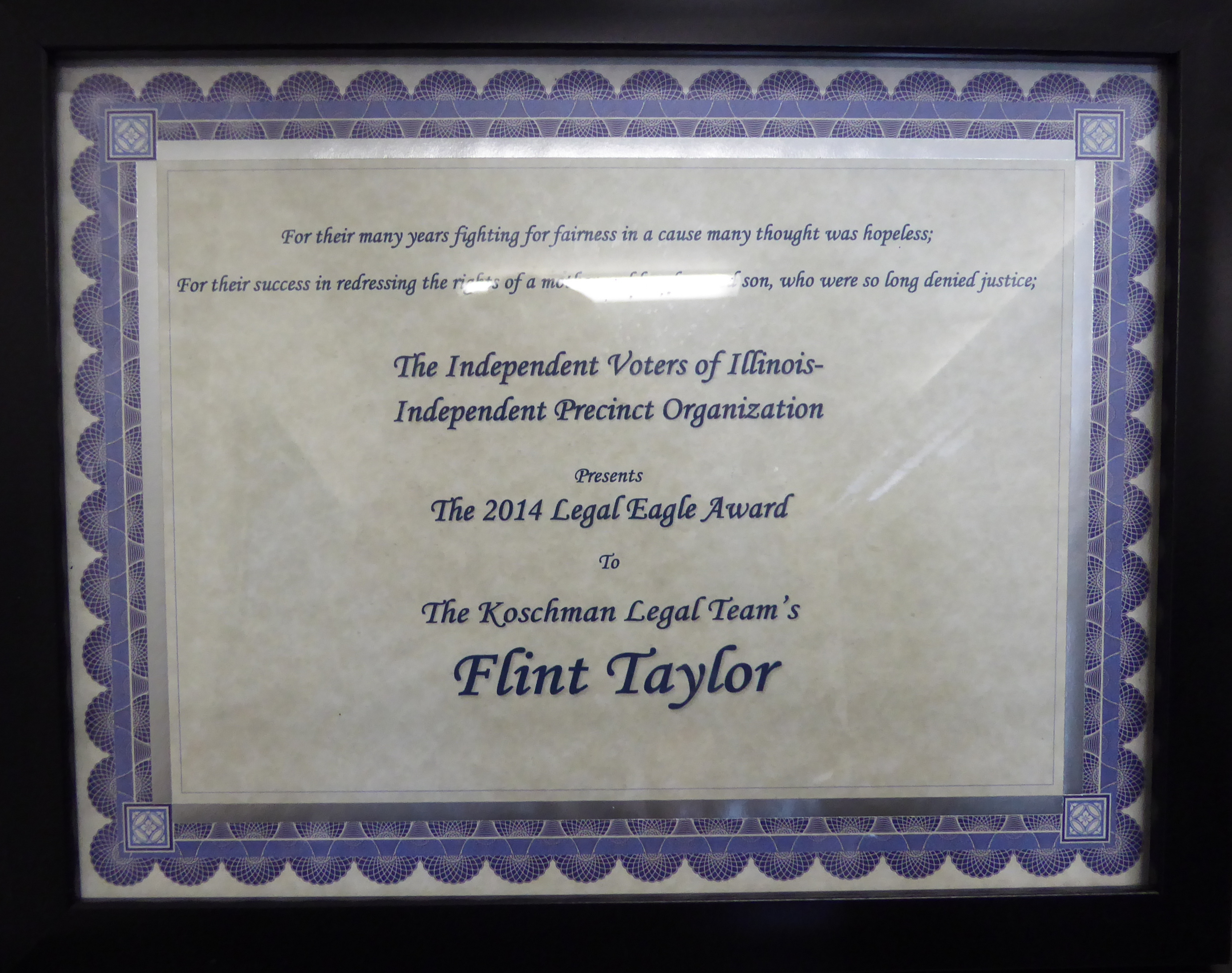
2014: The IVI-IPO's Legal Eagle Award, given annually to lawyers who have advanced the cause of justice, was presented to G. Flint Taylor. (Shared with Locke Bowman, Director of the MacArthur Justice Center and Alexa Van Brunt, Clinical Assistant Professor of Law and attorney for the MacArthur Justice Center). The three were recognized for their work on behalf of the family of David Koschman, who died in 2004 after being punched by Richard J. Vanecko, a nephew of former Chicago Mayor Richard M. Daley.

- 2011 – Northwestern Law School's SFPIF (Student Funded Public Interest Fellowship Program) Distinguished Alumnus Award for "outstanding commitment to public service."
- 2010 – National Lawyers Guild Chicago Chapter's Arthur Kinoy People's Law Award for his "commitment to the struggle for justice for the survivors of torture."
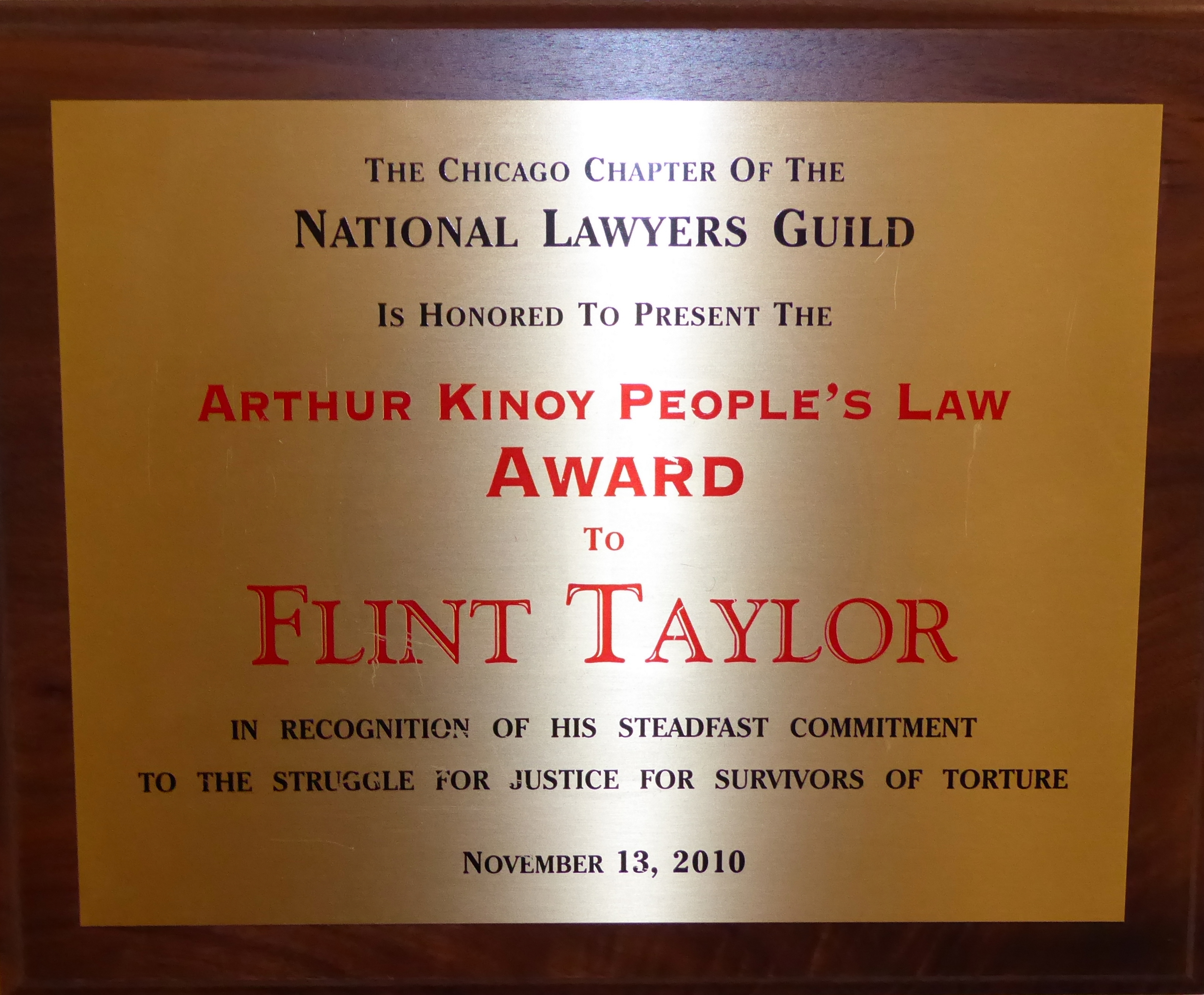
  2010: National Lawyers Guild Chicago Chapter's Arthur Kinoy Award given to G. Flint Taylor for his "steadfast commitment to the struggle for justice for the survivors of torture." (Shared with law partners Joey Mogul and John Stainthorp)
- 2009 – First Defense Legal Aid's First Defender Award for a "tireless commitment to protecting the civil rights of Chicago citizens."
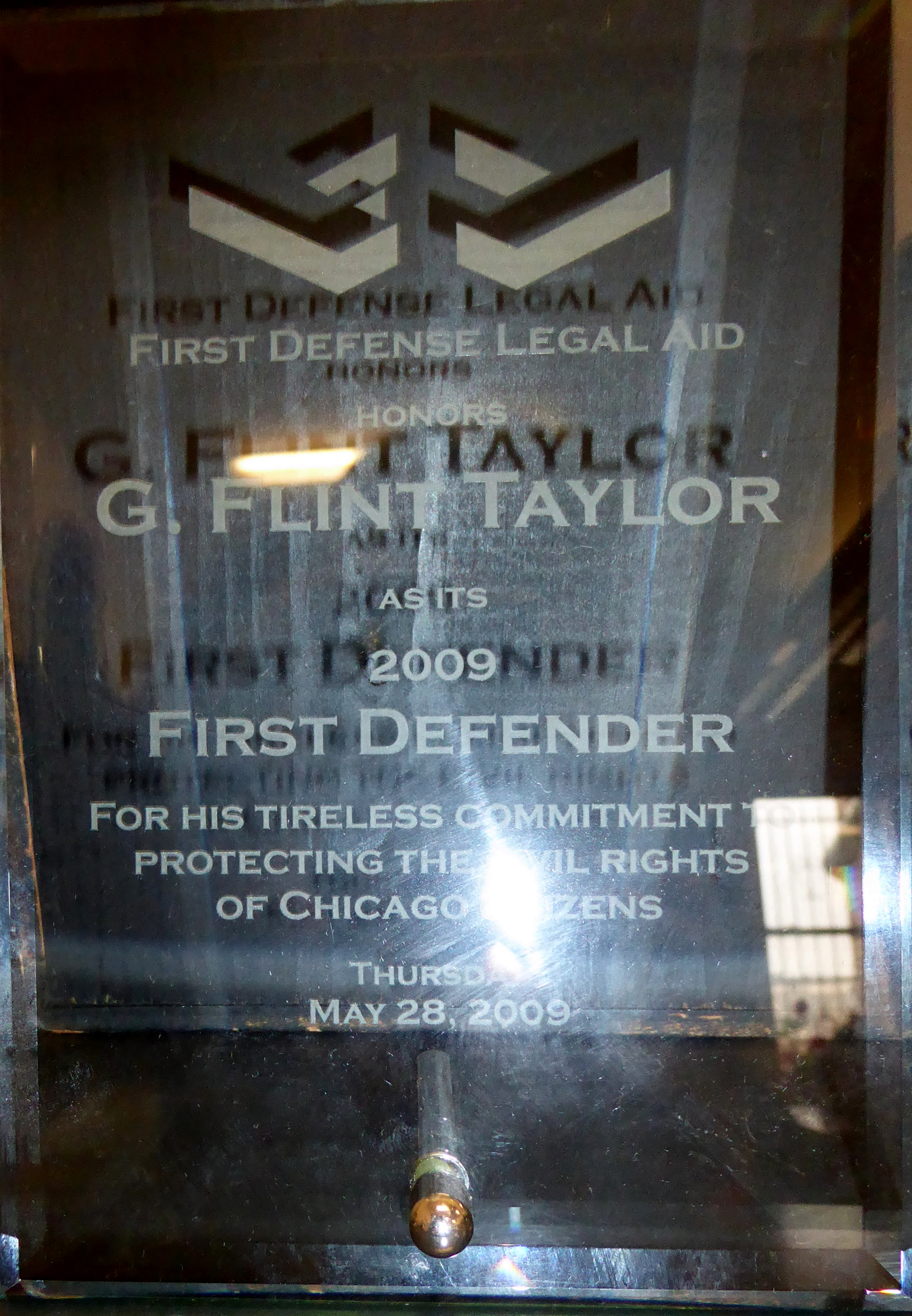
  2009: First Defense Legal Aid's First Defender Award given to G. Flint Taylor for his "tireless commitment to protecting the civil rights of Chicago citizens."

Rainbow PUSH Coalition Father of the Community Award for "service and dedication to family and community."

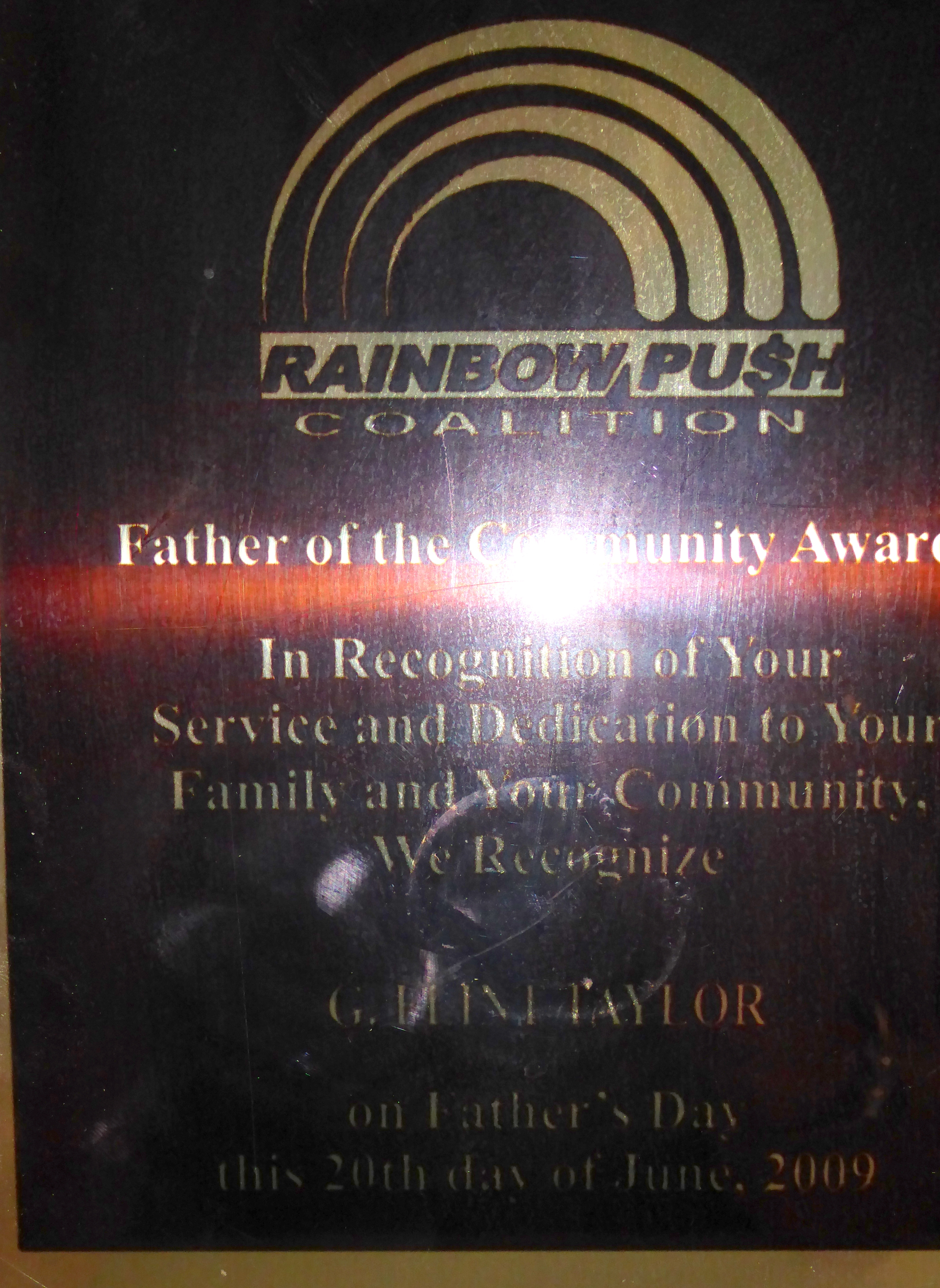
2009: Rainbow PUSH Coalition Father to the Community Award

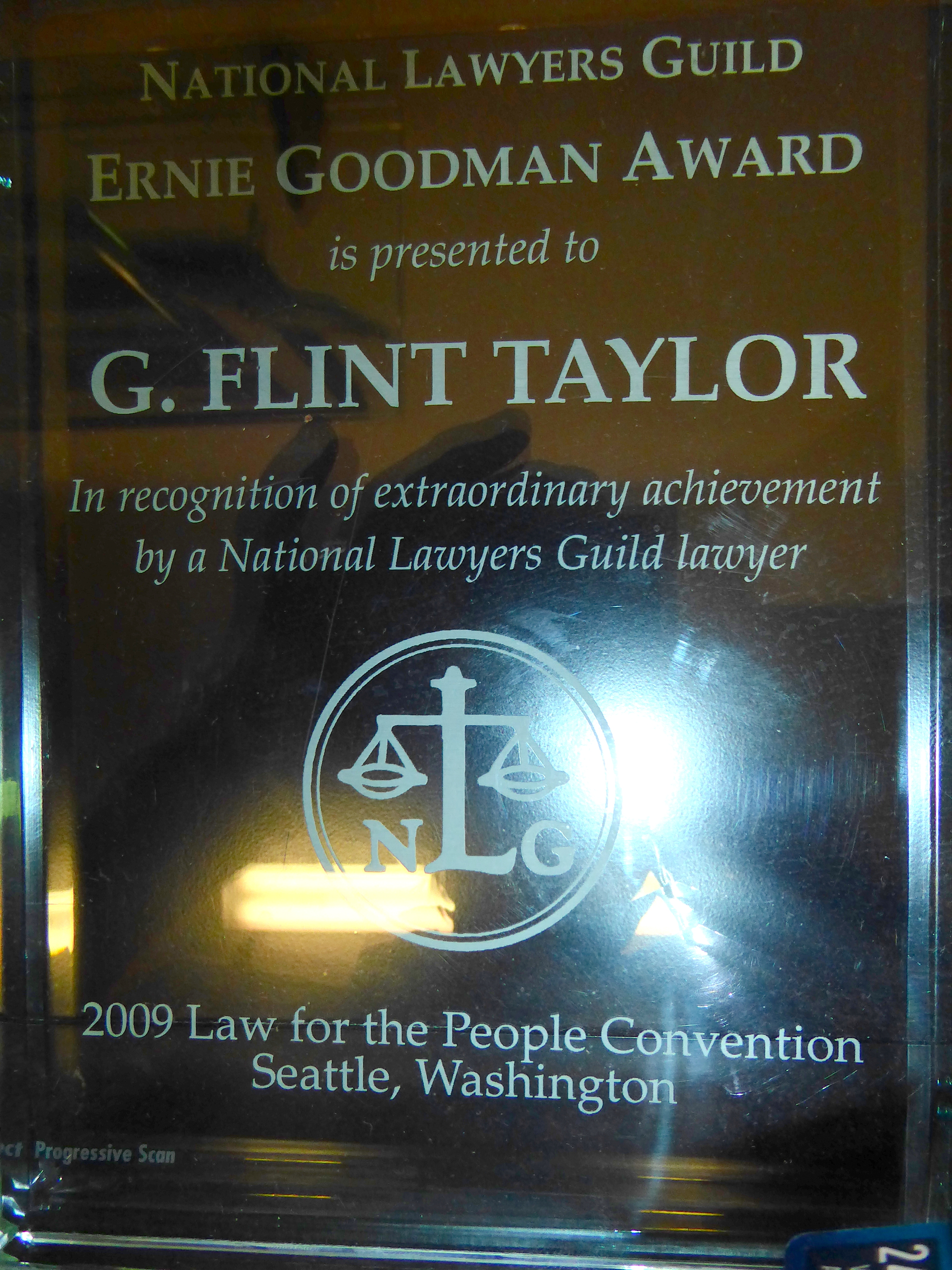
2009: National Lawyers Guild's Ernie Goodman Award given to G. Flint Taylor at its convention in Seattle "in recognition of extraordinary achievement by a National Lawyers Guild lawyer."

National Lawyers Guild's Ernie Goodman Award "in recognition of extraordinary achievement by a National Lawyers Guild lawyer."

- 2008 – Cook County Bar Association's William R. Ming Jr. Award for "outstanding and substantial contribution to the causes of civil rights and individual liberties."
- 1977 – Operation PUSH Letter of Commendation "Advocate For Our Freedom"

== U.S. Supreme Court decisions ==
Taylor's first case before the U.S. Supreme Court was in 1980, when Taylor, Haas and Cunningham successfully defended the Court of Appeals' decision in the Fred Hampton case against several petitions for certiorari. In 1985, Taylor successfully argued before the Court that federal prison guards should not be given immunity from civil rights liability when they sit on prison disciplinary committees. In 1993, he argued a case in which the Court created an exception to a prosecutor's absolute immunity from suit.

== Other significant cases ==
In the early 1980s, Taylor worked with New Orleans civil rights attorney Mary Howell to obtain a multi-million-dollar settlement in a series of civil rights cases that arose from the alleged torture and killing of several African Americans by New Orleans police officers in the Algiers section of the city. Taylor also worked in the mid 80's with People's Law Office colleagues Cunningham, Haas, Stainthorp, Michael Deutsch and Peter Schmiedel on the "street files" cases, during which Chicago police detective Frank Laverty brought to light the Chicago Police Department's secret filing system in which detectives concealed evidence that supported a criminal defendant's innocence.

=== Ford Heights Four ===
In the late 1990s, Taylor joined Wyoming attorney Jerry Spence, now Federal Judge Matthew Kennelly, and former Northwestern School of Law professor Lawrence Marshall to obtain a $36-million-dollar wrongful conviction settlement for four men, who each served more than a decade behind bars for the 1978 murder of a couple in Ford Heights, Illinois, a suburb just south of Chicago. The Ford Heights Four were freed after DNA tests proved they were innocent. The Chicago Tribune quotes Taylor describing the case as another example of "outrageous police misconduct and prosecutorial misconduct." The newspaper reported:

By settling the lawsuits--which named as defendants the Cook County sheriff's office and five individual officers--the county avoided what promised to be a lengthy trial with embarrassing revelations about law enforcement work that was at best shoddy and at worst corrupt ... If any new investigation does get launched in the case, it will mark a dramatic departure from the stance previously taken by [Cook County] law-enforcement officials, who have strongly resisted tackling the issue of individual accountability for what happened in the Ford Heights Four case."

=== Ryan Harris case ===
In 1998, the Chicago police accused a seven-year-old boy, along with his eight-year-old friend, of the murder and sexual assault of an 11-year-old girl, Ryan Harris. The boys were exonerated after DNA evidence established that neither boy could have committed the crimes. In 2005, Taylor and his law colleagues Jan Susler and Stainthorp obtained a multi-million-dollar settlement for the seven-year-old defendant. Taylor remarked to reporters that the case showed "systemic misconduct" from the top to the bottom of the Chicago police department. When the children were brought in for questioning, Taylor noted, "No one said, 'Show me how these kids could have done that.' No one was ever disciplined for it. Everyone walked away."

The Ryan Harris case resulted in changes to Illinois law to protect the rights of juvenile suspects. A lawyer must now be in the room when Illinois children under age 13 charged with murder or sex crimes are interrogated. Chicago police also now require a parent or guardian's presence when kids under age 13 are suspected of any felony and are interrogated.

== Writing, media, and testimony before official bodies ==
Taylor contributes to a variety of academic journals, legal publications and online blogs, including The Nation and Huffington Post, on the subjects of police misconduct and racism. Both of Chicago's major newspapers have published opinion pieces by Taylor, who remains a harsh critic of Chicago's efforts in fixing accountability for police mistakes and misconduct. He has testified on these topics before the Chicago City Council,Cook County Board,U.S. Congressional Committees, and the Inter-American Commission on Human Rights.

When, in July 2006, Cook County Special Prosecutor Edward Egan failed to indict Burge for perjury and instead issued a report after four years of investigation of torture cases, Taylor publicly criticized the Special Prosecutor's failure to indict and called the report a cover-up that whitewashed the role of Richard M. Daley and other high ranking police and prosecutorial officials. Egan responded to Taylor's criticism in an interview with the Chicago Tribune. He questioned Taylor's motives, saying his main interest was making money.

Taylor has continued to be a public advocate in the effort to hold Daley accountable for police abuses during his watch. In March 2014, along with colleague Locke Bowman, Taylor filed a lawsuit accusing members of the Daley family of joining in a civil rights conspiracy with numerous high-ranking police and prosecutorial officials to cover-up facts in the case of David Koschman, who died in April 2004, after an altercation with former Mayor Daley's nephew, Richard J. "R.J." Vanecko.

In his book The Torture Machine: Racism and Police Violence in Chicago, Taylor recounts much of his struggle for human rights against the systemic racism of a corrupt criminal justice system in Chicago.
