= Leroy Orange =

American wrongfully convicted of murder (born 1950)

Leroy Orange (born July 20, 1950, in Chicago, Illinois) is an American man, who on January 12, 1984, was arrested along with his half-brother, Leonard Kidd, for the murders of four people (Ricardo Pedro, 25, Michelle Jointer, 30, Renee Coleman, 27, and Coleman's 10-year-old son, Tony) at 1553 W 91st Street in Chicago's South Side Brainerd neighborhood based on false accusations by Kidd. Orange was convicted on the basis of a confession he gave after being tortured in Chicago's Area 2 police station under the direction of Commander Jon Burge. Orange confessed to a murder after police placed a plastic bag over his head and applied electric shocks to his testicles. Burge was thrown off the force in 1993 for directing the torture of scores of people in custody.

Orange eventually confessed to the murders after twelve hours of interrogation and alleged torture at the hands of Chicago Police Lieutenant Jon Burge. At trial, despite Kidd's testimony on the witness stand that he had acted alone, Orange was convicted. It would later be found that this was at least in part due to his defense attorney's failures to mount a robust defense.

After several appeals that were being forestalled on technicalities, the Bluhm Legal Clinic, led by Thomas F. Geraghty, entered the case.

On January 10, 2003, Illinois Governor George Ryan granted Orange a full pardon based on innocence, criticizing prosecutors and the judiciary for relying on "procedural technicalities at the exclusion of the quest for truth".

Leroy Orange was subsequently arrested for attempting to sell crack cocaine to an undercover police officer.

== See also ==
- List of wrongful convictions in the United States
