= Peter Kuttner =

American filmmaker and activist

Peter Kuttner is a Chicago filmmaker, activist, and cameraman. He is known for his early socially-conscious documentary films that touch on topics such as opposition to United States involvement in the Vietnam War, gentrification of Chicago, racism, and social class. He produced many of these with the film collective Kartemquin Films, of which he was an original member. He is best known for his work on the film The End of the Nightstick (1993) with Cindi Moran and Eric Scholl, which documented police brutality in Chicago and torture allegations against commander Jon Burge. Kuttner has worked extensively in activism and community service, and was a founding member of activist group Rising Up Angry. Kuttner has worked with many collaborators including Kartemquin Collective founder Gordon Quinn, and filmmakers Haskell Wexler and Robert Kramer. He is also known for camera work on a number of major motion pictures including Man of Steel and Source Code.

== Early career ==
Kuttner grew up in a middle-class neighborhood and attended public school near Wrigley Field in Chicago, Illinois. He attended college at Northwestern University, where he created the film Cause Without a Rebel (1965), a short documentary film about student political complacency on the Northwestern Campus. Kuttner graduated from Northwestern that same year in 1965.

After graduation, Kuttner joined the War On Poverty Pre-College Film Workshop program. During this time he taught and collaborated with African-American students from Dillard University in New Orleans on the films Tackle is a Girl’s Best Friend (1965) and Mary Had a Little Lamb (1965).

In 1966 Kuttner was hired as a director at Chicago Television Station WTTW (Window to the World), a station that would eventually be owned by PBS. It was here that a visiting crew introduced Kuttner to the Cinéma vérité style of documentary filmmaking. There he made a small number of shows including the arts series "Facets".

=== Newsreel ===
After leaving WTTW in the fall of 1967, Kuttner became interested in political activism and eventually reconnected with some Canadian Cinéma vérité filmmakers he had worked with before, who were filming a piece about Norman Mailer out of the Toronto offices of Allan King. During his stay in New York, Kuttner met Melvin Margolis at a film screening, who then introduced him to Newsreel, a New York-based documentary film group whose subjects included the Anti-war movement, the Black Power movement, and the Women's liberation movement. The group had connections to anti-war protestors David Dellinger, Rennie Davis, and Tom Hayden, who would eventually be named as part of the Chicago Seven conspiracy.

Kuttner opened a Chicago chapter of the group, recruiting 15 members, including Jon Jost, and established ties with local film collectives like Kartemquin and The Film Group. The Chicago branch functioned mostly as a distributor for the New York Headquarters. The branch released one film under the name “Chicago Film Co-op”, April 27 (1986), which documented the 1968 Democratic National Convention protests and police response. They also started production on two other films that were later damaged in a fire. One of the films, a documentary about the Black Panther Party's Illinois chapter's involvement in the Free Breakfast for Children program, was lost completely. The other was the film Trick Bag, which Kuttner would eventually restore during his time at Kartemquin.

=== Activism and community service ===
Kuttner was a founding member of the Chicago New Left activist group Rise Up Angry, where he took a break from filmmaking. There, he wrote film reviews for the organization’s newspaper and helped organize their citywide free clinic. They worked alongside the Peace movement, Black Power movement, and Women's liberation movement.

Kuttner also spent time working with Upward Bound, a college prep program for students from disadvantaged areas. He also worked on the boards of the Community TV Network and Community Film Workshop, both established media programs for Chicago youth.

=== Kartemquin ===
Kuttner started working with Kartemquin in 1968, and joined officially in 1972 after he got a call from Gordon Quinn. At Kartemquin, his films covered topics ranging from gentrification to funding cuts of home-birth organizations. During his time there he worked on the films Hum 255, Trick Bag, and Now We Live on Clifton, and the Chicago Maternity Center Story (1976).

=== Trick Bag ===
Trick Bag was a collaboration between Kartemquin, Columbia College Chicago, and Rise Up Angry. Peter Kuttner's connection to Rise Up Angry sparked the creation of the film, as it was originally a Newsreel project that had been left unfinished when the group dissolved. The film negatives were destroyed in a fire, but Kuttner helped restore it from the work print when he joined Kartemquin in 1972. The film features various conversations and interviews with youth, workers, and veterans around Chicago talking about race and class. Trick Bag went on to earn the Chicago International Film Festival "Merit Award".

=== The End of the Nightstick ===
In 1994 Kuttner collaborated with Chicago Torture Justice, an organization dealing with the aftermath and recovery of brutality experienced at the hands of police officers like Jon Burge. Kuttner produced The End of the Nightstick (1994), a PBS P.O.V. broadcast, with Cyndi Moran and Eric Scholl. The film received a Silver Hugo from the Chicago International Film Festival in 1994.

== Later career ==
In 2017 Kuttner worked as an instructor to Community TV Network students, who created a film featuring the south side of Chicago community center. The short film, Welcome to the Peace House, went on to win the CHICAGO Award by the Chicago International Film Festival’s CineYouth Festival. Kuttner has continued his work as a political activist through local activist groups and as a member of the International Alliance of Theatrical Stage Employees Union, and as a board member of South Side Projections.

== Commercial filmmaking ==
Kuttner has contributed to a number of commercial productions in Chicago as a camera assistant. Some of these include Ferris Bueller's Day Off (1986), The Dark Knight (2008), Source Code (2011), Transformers: Dark of the Moon (2011), Formosa Betrayed (2009), and the U.S. version of TV series Shameless. Others that were filmed in and around Chicago were Man of Steel (2013), Cheaper by the Dozen (2003), Proof (2005), The Break-Up (2006), Eagle Eye (2008), Traitor (2008), Barbershop 2: Back in Business (2004), and Mad Dog and Glory (1993).
