= Rainbow Coalition (Fred Hampton) =

Multicultural movement founded in 1969

- Formation: 1969; 57 years ago
- Type: Civil rights group
- Purpose: Promotion of socialism, anti-racism, and class solidarity
- Headquarters: Chicago, Illinois
- Location: United States
- Founder: Fred Hampton
- Key people: Fred Hampton; Bob Lee; José "Cha Cha" Jiménez; William "Preacherman" Fesperman

The Rainbow Coalition was an American anti-racist and socialist political organization that united various marginalized groups in Chicago, Illinois. Under leadership of the Illinois Chapter of the Black Panther Party (ILBPP), the Rainbow Coalition was formed around a political alliance between the ILBPP, Young Patriots Organization (YPO), and the Young Lords Organization (YLO), and would later incorporate other political groups, community groups and activists, and street gangs. It was the first of several 20th-century Black-led organizations to use the "rainbow coalition" concept and name.

The Rainbow Coalition's ideology centered on class solidarity, uniting poor and working-class people across racial lines against shared oppression. It emphasized using direct action to pressure local government into achieving tangible improvements, with objectives including reducing unemployment, improving public education, and counteracting gentrification. Members of the Rainbow Coalition also sponsored a wide range of service programs at reduced or no costs to their respective communities, such as breakfasts for children, health clinics, busing to prisons, daycare centers, clothing, ambulance services, among many other efforts.

== History ==
=== Context and formation of key groups (mid-to-late 1960s) ===
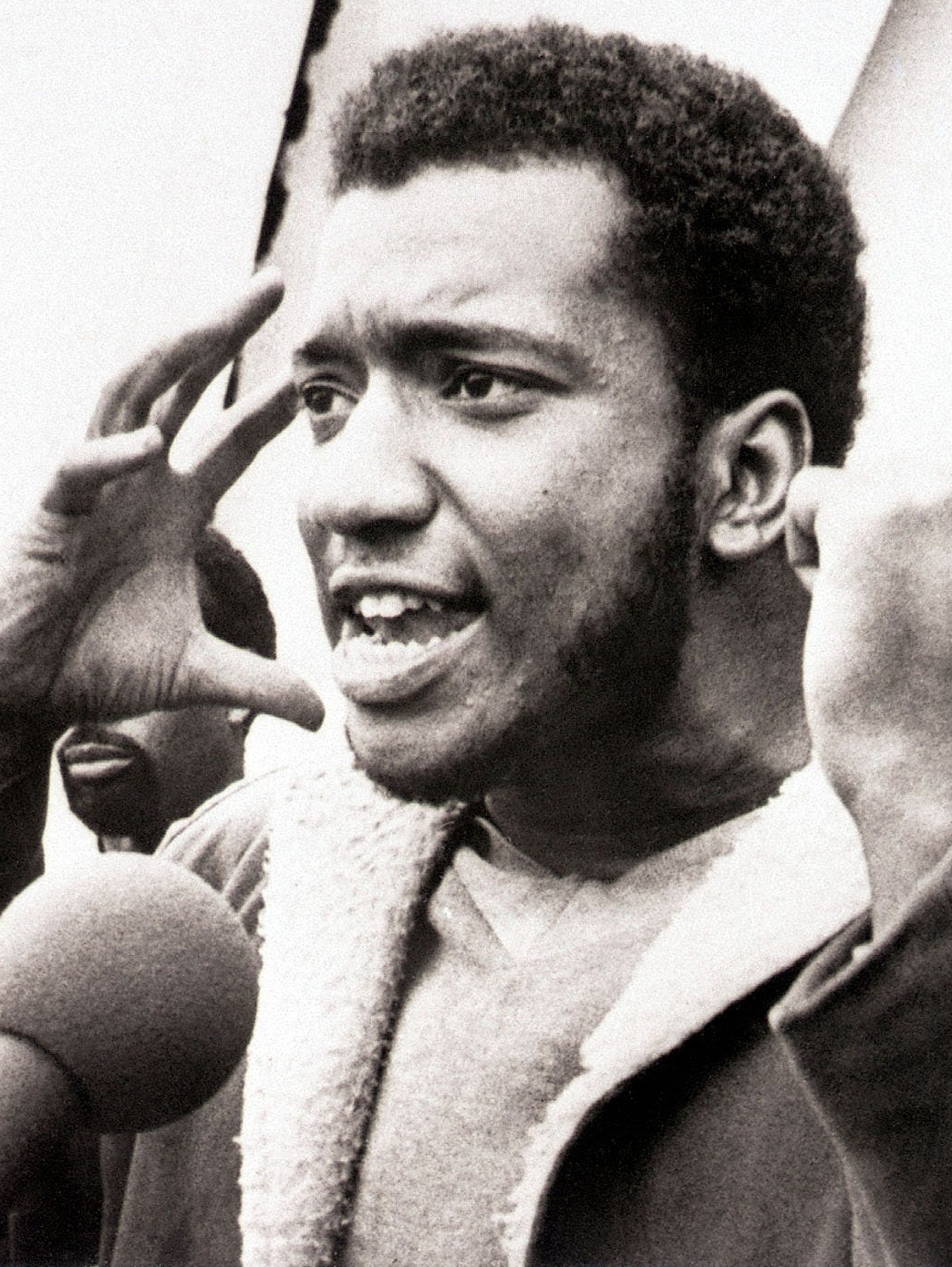
Fred Hampton giving a speech at a rally in Grant Park, Chicago, 1969

The 1960s in the United States saw a rise in social movements addressing social inequality and injustice. Chicago, Illinois, became a key location for several influential organizations, including the Illinois chapter of the Black Panther Party, the Young Lords, the Young Patriots Organization, and Rising Up Angry (RUP). These groups organized direct action campaigns and created aid programs to combat common class-based issues like discriminatory housing, inadequate healthcare, education and civil rights violations, often specific to their respective communities.

==== The Illinois Chapter of the Black Panther Party ====
The Illinois Chapter of the Black Panther Party (ILBPP) was founded in November 1968 by Fred Hampton and Bobby Rush. Following the lead of the Black Panther Party (BPP) national office in Oakland, California, the ILBPP demonstrated legal methods of self defense against police brutality and harassment, then expanding to serve Chicago's African American community through "survival programs" like free breakfasts and health clinics. While there was no official head of the Rainbow Coalition, the ILBPP, under the leadership of Fred Hampton, was the de facto leader of the partnership.

Jakobi Williams argues that while Hampton was the face of the Rainbow Coalition, ILBPP Field Secretary, Bob Lee, "served as the legman." Hampton gave speeches and sat for interviews on behalf of the Rainbow Coalition, but Lee was the most active organizer of the group, playing a key role in creating the alliance with the Young Patriots Organization.

==== The Young Patriots Organization ====
The Young Patriots Organization (YPO) was a leftist political group that descended from earlier activist groups like the Jobs or Income Now (JOIN) Community Union and the Congress of Racial Equality (CORE). Self-described as "dislocated hillbillies", the YPO was a collection of Appalachian migrants, predominantly from states like Kentucky and West Virginia. Inspired by groups like the BPP and the Student Non-Violent Coordinating Committee, the YPO sought to address issues plaguing working class white people in urban centers like poverty, inadequate housing, and social welfare programs. Influenced by the Civil Rights Movement and the Black Panther Party, they advocated for social justice, community empowerment, and solidarity across racial divides.

Emily Ann Wilson recently contended that, in the context of chattel slavery, the "Young Patriots acknowledged the role of the robber-baron-bourgeoisie in the enslavement of Black peoples and the theft of native land for capitalist expansion, and they also heavily emphasized their lack of control over their own destinies, but they failed to truly acknowledge the extent to which the white working class committed these crimes on the bourgeois' behalf or even in an attempt to establish their own self-determination." In her youth, YPO proponents informed historian Roxanne Dunbar-Ortiz "that getting the poor white kids hooked up with Blacks and Puerto Ricans and Indians dissolved their racism." In YPO ideas and programs, "class" trumped race. Synchronicity had to be maintained between the late twentieth-century "struggle", the causes of the Civil War, "past white populist movements", and their modern display of the Confederate battle flag.

==== The Young Lords Organization ====
Also in 1968, José "Cha Cha" Jiménez transformed the Young Lords, previously a Puerto Rican street gang in Chicago, into a community-focused political organization, the Young Lords Organization (YLO). Inspired partly by the BPP, the YLO championed the rights of minority populations, focusing on issues like healthcare, education, housing, sanitation, and employment.

Jiménez, elected as president of the Young Lords in 1964, oriented the group's actions to address the displacement of Puerto Rican communities in Chicago's Lincoln Park neighborhood during urban renewal. Inspired by the leadership of the ILBPP, the Young Lords Organization became highly politically active, staging protests and direct action campaigns to put social pressure on local power structures. For example, campaigns from the YLO pressured real estate developers from raising rent prices, they pressured the school board into improving area schools and led protests against police brutality and harassment. It was this direct action that made the YLO a candidate to join the Rainbow Coalition.

=== Genesis of the coalition (1968–1969) ===
The idea for a cross-racial coalition began to form through interactions between these groups. In Bob Lee of the Illinois BPP attended a community meeting where he heard members of the Young Patriots discussing shared issues like police brutality and poverty, sparking the idea of unity based on common class struggles rather than race. Fred Hampton, recognizing the potential power in such an alliance, actively worked to build relationships, notably recruiting the Young Lords into the fold.

Other prominent members of the Rainbow Coalition included Young Patriot members Jack "Junebug" Boykin, Bobby Joe Mcginnis, and Hy Thurman, as well as Field Marshal Bobby Lee of the Black Panthers.

=== Founding, activities, and expansion (April 1969 onwards) ===
The Rainbow Coalition was formed slowly through a series of conferences and alliances, reaching a solid partnership in spring of 1969. The key founders representing the initial core groups were Fred Hampton of the Black Panther Party, William "Preacherman" Fesperman of the Young Patriots Organization, and José "Cha Cha" Jiménez of the Young Lords Organization.

The Rainbow Coalition soon included various radical leftist and socialist community groups like Rising Up Angry ("RUP"). RUP was formed in 1969 as a monthly newspaper, and then as a political organization, both with the express purpose of galvanizing "white working class youth to ally with Blacks and Latinos to create a Rainbow Coalition to fight [social] injustice." Fred Hampton's coalition was later joined nationwide by the Students for a Democratic Society ("SDS"), the Brown Berets, the American Indian Movement, and the Red Guard Party. In April 1969, Hampton called several press conferences to announce that this "Rainbow Coalition" had formed. The Rainbow Coalition engaged in joint action against poverty, corruption, racism, police brutality, and substandard housing. The participating groups supported one another at protests, strikes, and demonstrations where they had a common cause.

The coalition espoused an iteration of militancy that aimed to decrease urban unemployment, promote public education, and advance class solidarity. For instance, in a 1970 issue of The Patriot, the Young Patriots Organization called for nonviolent support of Bobby Seale (on trial), but also declared that "Guns in the Hands of the Police Represent Capitalism and Racism...Guns In the Hands of the People Represent Socialism and Solidarity." Scholars distinguish this militancy from the direct action of "militant nonviolence" formulated by Martin Luther King Jr., weeks before his assassination during the 1968 Poor People's Campaign, by Erik Erikson in Gandhi's Truth (1969), and by Coretta Scott King during the 1970 imprisonment of Cesar Chavez. Elements of this alternate variant have, in turn, been found in doctrines of nonviolent extremism.

Amy Sonnie and James Tracy argue that membership in the Illinois chapter of the Black Panther Party, and then the Young Lords, declined after the formation of this particular Rainbow Coalition, stemming from internal debates in both organizations over an alliance with the Young Patriots Organization. Lee and Jiménez later recalled that "it was a necessary purging", especially after July 1969, when Hampton replaced "white man" with "capitalist" in the third point of the ILBPP Ten-Point Program.

=== Survival programs and direct action campaigns ===
The Rainbow Coalition would establish community survival programs, modeled after initiatives created by the BPP Oakland chapter, to meet the immediate needs of marginalized communities, such as the Young Patriots Free Health Clinic, which provided medical care to those excluded from mainstream healthcare. Similarly, they organized free breakfast programs and food pantries to combat food insecurity within impoverished neighborhoods. They also offered legal services to community members.

Beyond direct aid, the coalition engaged in political protest. For instance, they marched on the East Chicago Avenue police station to demonstrate against police brutality, specifically the killing of Young Lord Manuel Ramos. A key aspect of their work involved political and racial education. They planned educational programs for students, with the Black Panthers focusing on Black students and the Young Patriots on white students, to raise awareness about issues like inadequate education, unemployment, and poor housing conditions. Collaboration between groups like the Young Patriots, Young Lords, and Black Panthers was central to their activities, fostering inter-racial solidarity in their efforts.

=== Challenges and decline (1969) ===
Despite its rapid growth and influence, the Rainbow Coalition faced intense opposition. The FBI's COINTELPRO program, aimed at "neutralizing" subversive groups, targeted the Black Panther Party and Hampton specifically, fearing his ability to unify Black communities and forge cross-racial alliances. Tactics employed included extensive surveillance, infiltration by informants like William O'Neal, spreading disinformation to discredit the BPP and create conflict within the coalition, and disrupting their community programs.

The culmination of these efforts was the deadly predawn raid on Hampton's apartment on December 4, 1969, conducted by local police with FBI involvement, resulting in the assassinations of Hampton and Mark Clark. Evidence strongly suggests the raid was a targeted assassination, with informant O'Neal providing crucial information and likely drugging Hampton. Local police departments, particularly in Chicago, also engaged in harassment, raids, and suppression of the Rainbow Coalition's constituent groups and their community initiatives.

=== Legacy ===
The phrase "rainbow coalition" was co-opted over the years by Reverend Jesse Jackson, who eventually appropriated the name in forming his own, more moderate coalition, Rainbow/PUSH. As Mayor of Chicago, Harold Washington directly referenced and invoked the Rainbow Coalition in his creation of the Rainbow Cabinet. The Rainbow Cabinet was tasked with addressing cross-racial class-based issues, much like the Rainbow Coalition. Washington's tenure in office was specifically referenced by Barack Obama as a point of inspiration. Additionally, David Axelrod, a political consultant for Harold Washington aided the Obama campaign with strategies from the Washington campaign.

The organization would be the subject of the documentary First Rainbow Coalition, which originally aired on January 27, 2020, as an episode of PBS TV series Independent Lens.

== Members ==
Organization	Ethnic group	Ideology
Black Panther Party	African Americans	Marxism–Leninism; Revolutionary nationalism
Young Lords Organization	Puerto Ricans	Marxism–Leninism; Revolutionary nationalism
Young Patriots Organization	Urban Appalachians	Anti-capitalism; Anti-racism
American Indian Movement	American Indians	Pan-Indianism; Anti-racism
White Panther Party	White Americans	Anti-capitalism; Anti-racism
Brown Berets	Mexican Americans	Chicanismo; Anti-capitalism
Rising Up Angry	Multiethnic	Socialism
Red Guard Party	Chinese Americans	Maoism; Anti-racism
Students for a Democratic Society	Multiethnic	New Leftism

== See also ==
- Political history of Chicago
