= Red Guard Party =

- Founded: February 1969
- Dissolved: 1973
- Headquarters: San Francisco, California
- Ideology: Chinese nationalism; Maoism; Revolutionary socialism; Anti-imperialism; Anti-racism
- Political position: Far-left
- National affiliation: Rainbow Coalition

The Red Guard Party was a Chinese-American youth organization formed in February 1969. It was named after the Red Guards of the Chinese Cultural Revolution.

== Origins ==
The Red Guard formation resulted from several societal and economic pressures combined in the late 1960s. During that time, the Black Panther Party had already gained significant media and community attention for their militaristic actions and struggles for self-determination and third world solidarity, and for the opposing governmental oppression.

San Francisco's Chinatown was plagued with poverty and overcrowding, with a steady supply of immigrants joining the numbers. Chinatown offered few job opportunities and there were health concerns as the area suffered some of highest rates of tuberculosis in the country. For those who were healthy and did not turn to violence, the pool halls of the town existed as one of the few recreational amenities available. (Note: A major aspect of the community for Chinatown was founded in the pool halls. Specifically Leway, a pool hall founded from a community raffle focused on using the proceeds of the business for youth benefit, was the political hub of the youth involved in the Red Guard. With a meeting place and a strong community, the roots of the Red Guard Party originated in the halls of Leway, but also served to be a focal point for police brutality.)

The popularity of the pool halls helped to develop the youth community of Chinatown. Leway pool hall was an iconic recreation center for the Red Guard party. In the halls of Leway, youth were able to discuss openly revolutionary ideas and their disdain for the government that had contributed to their social injustice.

Alex Hing, though not a founding member, provided leadership to the Red Guards. Under the Students for a Democratic Society, Hing learned many leadership skills which he utilized in helping form the Red Guard. While advocating for Ethnic Studies at local community college, he read works promoted by the Black Panther Party including the Red Book and writings of Malcolm X. The frustrated youth of Chinatown drew the attention of the Black Panther Party leaders Bobby Seale and David Hilliard. These leaders invited the youth to study their core ideology. With strong leaders such as Hing and the influence by the Black Panther Party, the Red Guard was formed in the Leway pool hall in February 1969 to improve the conditions of Chinatown and Asian Americans.

== Ideology ==
In 1969 when the Red Guard was formed, they mirrored themselves in many ways after the Black Panther Party. They favored militaristic garb which was adorned with a Mao jacket to show ties to their roots of the Red Guard in China. They also conducted themselves as a military organization, described by a former member as an "army" even. This closely tied with the success and iconic nature of the Black Panther Party. The Red Guard even adopted their own ten point plan which was influenced by the Black Panther Party; however, it specifically targeted Chinatown and the transgressions of the United States government against Asians and Asians living in United States. The ten point plan consisted of demands of the government based upon their power as street youth and human dignity. The ten point plan was as follows:

1. We want freedom. We want power to determine the destiny of our people, the Yellow Community. We believe that Yellow people will not be free until we are able to determine our destiny.
2. We want decent housing, fit for shelter of human beings. We believe that if the white landlord will not give decent housing to our Yellow community, then the housing and the land should be made into cooperatives so that our community, with government aid, can build and make decent housing for its people.
3. We want education for our people that exposes the true nature of this decadent American society. We want education that teaches us our true history and our role in the present-day society. We believe in an educational system that will give to our people a knowledge of self. If a man does not have knowledge of himself and his position in society and the world, then he has little chance to relate to anything else.
4. We want all Yellow men to be exempt from military service, believe that Yellow people should not be forced to fight in the military service to defend a racist government that does not protect us. We will not fight and kill people of color in the world who, like Yellow people, are being victimized by the white racist government of America. We will protect ourselves from the force and of the racist military, by whatever means necessary.
5. We want an immediate end to police brutality and murder of Yellow people. We believe we can end police brutality in our Yellow community by organizing self-defense groups that are dedicated to defending our Yellow community from police oppression and brutality. The Second Amendment to the Constitution of the United States gives a right to bear arms. We, therefore, believe that all Yellow people should arm themselves for self-defense.
6. We want freedom for all Yellow men held in federal, state, county and city prisons and jails. We believe that all Yellow people should be released from the many jails and prisons because they have not received a fair and impartial trial.
7. We want all Yellow People when brought to trial to be tried in court by a jury of their peer group or people from their Yellow communities, as defined by the Constitution of the United States. We believe that the courts should follow the United States Constitution so that Yellow people will receive fair trials. The 14th Amendment of the U.S. Constitution gives a man a right to be tried by his peer group. A peer is a person from a similar economic, social, religious, geographical, environmental, historical and racial background. To do this the court will be forced to select a jury from the Yellow community from which the Yellow defendant came. We have been, and are being tried by juries that have no understanding of the "average reasoning man of the Yellow community."
8. We want adequate and free medical facilities available for the people in the Yellow community. We know that Chinatown has the highest density area next to Manhattan. It also has the highest TB and sickness rate in the nation.
9. We want full employment for our people. We believe that the federal government is responsible and obligated to give every man employment or a guaranteed income. We believe that if the white American businessman will not give full employment, then the means of production should be taken from the businessmen and placed in the community so that the people of the community can organize and employ all its people and give a high standard of living. There are thousands of immigrants coming into Chinatown every year and it is almost impossible for them to find gainful employment.
10. We demand that the United States government recognize the People's Republic of China. We believe that Mao Tse-Tung is the true leader of the Chinese people; not Chiang Kai-shek. The government of the United States is now preparing for war against the Chinese People's Republic and against the Chinese people. The racist government of the United States has proven that it will put only peoples of color in concentration camps, Japanese were placed in concentration camps; therefore, it is logical that the next people that will be going are the Chinese people; because the United States is gearing its war time industrial complex for war against China."

The demands that followed required affordable housing. This demand was founded upon the dense population of Chinatown that was over populated meanwhile having a constant influx of immigrants. This influx and poor conditions combined with few employment opportunities caused a significant concern for the youth in the Red Guard. The organization also demanded that "all Yellow men be exempt from military service" based on the historic racial discrimination and violence within the U.S. Also, they demanded trial by jury for Asian Americans by Asian Americans as it was impossible to separate any racial prejudices of any other jury who could not even be deemed peers due to the stark differences in social and political background. Sparked by the struggle with the tuberculosis center, they also demanded fair and free medical facilities for their community.

== Actions and decline ==
While many aspects of their political platform were not addressed, they experienced several successes. The Red Guard focused many of their efforts specifically on the Chinatown community. This is evident in the language of the ten point plan, but was also seen through their actions. The Red Guard tailored community service programs, such as breakfasts the Black Panther Party provided and changed it to a Sunday brunch for the elderly, reflecting their distinct cultural values and unique requirements as a community. The tuberculosis center was also kept open for Chinatown and they also led petitions in an effort to save the historic International Hotel. As their founding would suggest with a title such as the Red Guard Party, the political group was focused on gaining attention to the Asian American struggle and remaining critical of the U.S. government.

The Red Guard was attributed with a brief span due to their focus on paramilitary force. They viewed themselves as an "army" rather than a political organization and were dealt with as such which their founding name would suggest. (Note: The Red Guard party was originally proposed to be the Red Dragons; however, under Bobby Seale's recommendation they went with the Red Guard as a way of combatting the stigma against communism. The founding of the party with a controversial name exemplified the Red Guard's abrasive nature.) They also failed to inspire and include members other than mainly male youth. Failure to incorporate the middle class served to dissolve their party as their efforts was not carried by the entirety of their community.
