= Rising Up Angry =

American youth movement and newspaper

Rising Up Angry, Oct. 8–Oct. 29, 1972.

Rising Up Angry was a radical youth movement organized as a militant and socialist community organization based in working class communities in Chicago, parallelling but not part of the Weatherman Underground and Revolutionary Youth Movement currents in New Left politics at the end of the 1960s.

== Description ==
They published a monthly newspaper also called Rising Up Angry from 1969 to 1975, describing itself as "a revolutionary organization committed to building a new man, a new woman, and a new world," with the masthead motto "To love we must fight." RUA took their name from the lyrics to the song "Shape of Things to Come" in the 1968 movie Wild in the Streets. The membership of the organization was of local blue-collar youth recruited out of the neighborhood subcultures called by the paper "greasers," a term used at the time to describe disaffected white youths stuck nostalgically in the subculture of the 1950s (see Grease). Members were mostly working class youths with union ties and socialist leanings who were disappointed with the efforts of perceived elitist and working class-disconnected groups like the Students for a Democratic Society.

Rising Up Angry's newspaper was distributed throughout the Chicago area by volunteers focusing their distribution on high schools, union halls, university campuses; mostly a youth market. It encouraged radical dissent and featured profiles of figures such as Malcolm X and Fred Hampton, John Dillinger, Bonnie and Clyde, reviews of the Rolling Stones, Stevie Wonder and The Wild Bunch, mixing political and cultural commentary with politically oriented cartoons by Aaron Fagen and others, montages, discussions of motorcycles and custom cars, and histories of labor activism and guerrilla warfare.

== See also ==
- List of underground newspapers of the 1960s counterculture

== Links ==
- 'Rising Up Angry - Chicago Area'
- 'Politically oriented cartoons from Rising Up Angry'
