= Young Patriots Organization =

American left-wing organization active 1968–1973

- Abbreviation: YPO
- Founded: 1968; 58 years ago
- Dissolved: 1973; 53 years ago
- Succeeded by: Patriot Party
- Headquarters: Uptown, Chicago, U.S.
- Ideology: Anti-racism; Anti-capitalism
- Political position: Far-left
- National affiliation: Rainbow Coalition

Party flag

The Young Patriots Organization (YPO) was an American leftist organization of mostly White Southerners from Uptown, Chicago. Originating in 1968 and active until 1973, the organization was designed to support young, white migrants from the Appalachia region who experienced extreme poverty and discrimination. The organization promoted Southern culture and used a Confederate battle flag as a symbol. Along with the Illinois Black Panther Party and the Young Lords, the Young Patriots Organization formed the Rainbow Coalition, a group of allied but racially separate organizations each focused on helping with issues of poverty and discrimination among their local community while working together towards internationalist and anti-capitalist goals.

== History ==
=== Precursors ===
Chicago was one of many American industrial cities that experienced an influx of White Southerners who came seeking employment throughout the 19th and 20th centuries. In 1970, Chicago and the neighboring city of Gary had about 280,000 white residents who had been born in the South; they were particularly concentrated in the Uptown neighborhood of Chicago, where they made up 80% of the population. The group was culturally isolated, treated as outsiders by other Chicagoans. They often experienced severe poverty and were targets of police brutality. They were derided as "hillbillies", particularly among the press: the group was summarized in a subtitle to a 1958 article in Harper's Magazine as "proud, poor, primitive, and fast with a knife".

The Uptown neighborhood was home to several youth gangs in the 1950s and 1960s, a number of which formed among the Southern newcomers. The gangs formed "not only along the color line, but also along interfaces between different European American groups—between, for example, communities of Irish and Poles, Poles and Italians, Swedes and Italians, Jews and Poles". Inter-gang violence was particularly noticeable as Black Americans began to move into Chicago neighborhoods.

Amidst this environment, community organizers tried to address the issues of poverty and unemployment in the area in groups like the Jobs or Income Now (JOIN) community union, which grew out of the Students for a Democratic Society organization that encouraged local activism in Uptown. Both co-founders of the Young Patriots, Jack "Junebug" Boykin and Doug Youngblood, as well as other members had been involved with JOIN. Boykin and other Young Patriots were also active in Youngblood's National Organizing Committee (later the National Community Union), an interracial and working-class group that rallied around issues including free medical and childcare, higher corporate taxes, rank-and-file union leadership, and the end of the draft.

=== 1968–1969: Formation of the Rainbow Coalition ===
When the Young Patriots Organization and Bob Lee of the Illinois Chapter of the Black Panther Party were accidentally double-booked to speak at the Church of the Three Crosses in Lincoln Park on the same night, the two ended up discussing poverty among impoverished White Southerners in Chicago, shared experiences between White Southerners in Uptown and Black people in the South and West Sides, and comparisons between poverty in Chicago and the Vietnam War. This meeting, which was captured on film and later included in the 1969 documentary film American Revolution 2, was the precursor to the spring 1969 formation of the Rainbow Coalition by Bob Lee and Fred Hampton. At the outset the coalition was made up of the Young Patriots, the Illinois Black Panthers, and the Young Lords, and over the years they were joined by other community organizations. As the coalition expanded, so did the groups themselves, with the Young Patriots earning new members including the skilled speaker William "Preacherman" Fesperman, who would go on to become a leader among the Patriots. After joining the Rainbow Coalition, The Young Patriots maintained their focus on White Southerners and those in the Uptown, but usually were joined by one or both of the Black Panthers or the Young Lords in public appearances.

=== 1969–1970: Young Patriots Uptown Health Service ===
The Young Patriots were one of several groups in the Rainbow Coalition to mimic various activities of the Black Panthers. In addition to providing free breakfast programs for children, organizing clothing drives, and monitoring police activities, the Young Patriots also followed the Panthers' model of providing social services such as medical clinics directly to their communities. In October 1969, the Patriots opened a medical clinic to provide free care to Uptown residents. The Young Patriots Uptown Health Service's medical staff were primarily volunteer medical personnel from outside the group, and each patient also was assigned a Patriot as a patient advocate who would provide home visits and accompaniment to later appointments. The clinic provided dental and medical care to about 150 people in the first few months it was open, but by December it had been forced to close due to noise complaints from neighboring tenants. The Patriots alleged the closing was solely due to continued harassment from the police, which they said had scared away clients and staff alike. The clinic relocated, though many of their volunteers did not return. After reopening, the unlicensed clinic faced issues with the Board of Health, who were concerned the Patriots would use the facility to "treat gunshot wounds, hand out drugs irresponsibly, perform abortions or give shots with unsterile needles". As the Patriots battled with the Board of Health, they alleged that police harassed their patients, seizing prescribed medications and arresting them for narcotics possession. The Patriots also claimed the police harassed their members by crashing meetings between the Patriots and medical staff and arresting the Patriots for trespassing in their own buildings or for allegedly assaulting other members of the organization. Eventually the clinic was allowed to remain open and unlicensed in a July 10, 1970, decision that determined that "ordinance covering dispensaries was so vague as to be unenforceable". The clinic treated nearly 2,000 people by November of that year and came to be the most well-known accomplishment by the Young Patriots.

In 1969, a new branch of the Young Patriots emerged, calling themselves the Patriot Party. Over the next year, branches of the Patriots emerged in several cities across the United States, though they generally dissolved fairly quickly due to lack of momentum or were absorbed by other groups.

=== 1970–1973: Splintering and eventual dissolution ===
The groups in the Rainbow Coalition had already suffered a major blow with the 1969 assassination of Fred Hampton during a police raid of his apartment. In late 1970, the internal security subcommittee of the United States Senate charged a local church association, the North Side Cooperative Ministry, with financially supporting both the Young Patriots and the Young Lords. Although the consortium maintained that they had only supported free breakfast programs and legal defense funds and rebutted the claims that they had been supporting violent revolutionaries, the press coverage widely describing the two groups as "street gangs" reduced outside support for the community services run by the Patriots and other groups.

Media attention to the Young Patriots diminished following the success of their medical clinic, and though they continued to provide community services, none would be as effective or widely known as the clinic. The strongly Appalachian Uptown neighborhood gradually became more diverse as people from other countries immigrated to the area, and White Southerners moved elsewhere. By 1973, the Young Patriots Organization was, for the most part, defunct.

== Platform and ideology ==
In 1970, the Young Patriots formed an 11-point platform similar to the Black Panther Party's 1969 Ten-Point Program. The Patriots' platform shared the Panthers' opposition to the Vietnam War, police oppression, and capitalist exploitation. The two platforms also shared social goals including improved education, housing, medical care, and access to clothing, and union reform that would address issues of racism and inefficacy in the existing unions. The Young Patriots' platform included points that spoke about cultural nationalism and revolutionary solidarity, and denounced racism.

The Young Patriots' condemnation of cultural nationalism has since been described by Martin Alexander Krzywy, publishing in the Journal of African American Studies, as somewhat incongruous with their strong focus on Appalachian and southern heritage and their adoption of symbols including cowboy hats and the Confederate battle flag. However, according to Krzywy, this was not dissimilar from inconsistencies between the Black Panthers' and Young Lords' stated beliefs on cultural nationalism and the practices of some of their members. The Confederate battle flag also served the Young Patriots as a recruiting tool, attracting other white southerners. Though the multiracial groups among the Rainbow Coalition did not raise the Confederate imagery as an issue in the intergroup organizing, many radicals outside of the coalition saw the flag as incompatible with solidarity with the Black Panthers.

The Young Patriots were highly focused on class issues, and were critical of activist groups like the Students for a Democratic Society and the Southern Student Organizing Committee, who were largely focused on campus organizing. The Patriots denigrated their work as "petty bourgeoisie" and their members as having "had all the education, had all the schooling."

== Membership ==
The Young Patriots Organization described their membership as a diverse collection of people including Italians, Latinos, and American Indians. However, the backgrounds of its leaders and the symbols adopted by the group made it clear that the group was primarily centered around shared White Southerner identity. The Patriots were largely perceived by outsiders to be a group of white hillbilly gang members turned revolutionaries.

Krzywy, publishing in the Journal of African American Studies, wrote that "the Young Patriots tended to conflate Southernness and whiteness, to the exclusion of both poor white ethnics in Chicago and black Southerners who had moved to the city and shared many folkways with the Uptown residents." However, despite the group's exclusive intragroup identity, through the Rainbow Coalition the group organized effectively along with Blacks and Latinos in Chicago.

== See also ==
- Redneck Revolt
- Socialist patriotism
