= 53rd NAACP Image Awards =

American entertainment awards for 2021 works

- Date: February 26, 2022
- Hosted by: Anthony Anderson
- Official website: NAACPImageAwards.net

Television coverage
- Network: BET; BET Her; CMT; Comedy Central; Logo; MTV; MTV2; Paramount Network; Pop; Pluto TV; Smithsonian Channel; TV Land; VH1 (simulcast)

The 53rd NAACP Image Awards, presented by the NAACP, honored outstanding representations and achievements of people of color in motion pictures, television, music, and literature during the 2021 calendar year. The ceremony aired on February 26, 2022, on BET and simulcast on several of its sister Paramount Global Networks. The ceremony was hosted for the ninth time by actor Anthony Anderson. Presentations of untelevised categories were livestreamed on January 18, 2022, on the ceremony's website.

The nominations were announced on January 18, 2022, with the film The Harder They Fall and the comedy series Insecure leading the nominations with twelve each. In the recording categories, H.E.R. received the most nominations with six, followed by Chlöe, Drake, Silk Sonic and Jazmine Sullivan with four each. For the first time in the history of the awards ceremony, it have been included five categories to reward podcasts and social media influencer.

American journalist Nikole Hannah-Jones was honored with the Social Justice Impact Award at the ceremony for her "social efforts in reporting for The New York Times Magazine about the police injustices and crimes against black people in the United States". American actor and producer Samuel L. Jackson was also honored with the Chairman's Award, for his "social activism in the 1960s, even serving as an usher at Martin Martin Luther King Jr.’s funeral. His continued public service and advocacy for social change".

For the first time since 1993 ceremony, members of the Mexican American Legislative Caucus, Texas House Democratic Caucus and Texas Legislative Black Caucus were recognized with the Roy Wilkins Civil Rights Award to "exemplify the spirit of the NAACP".

The ceremony honored the President of the Connecticut State Conference of NAACP Branches, Scot X. Esdaile, with the first ever Activist of the Year Award. NAACP Youth-Council founder Chinning Hill was recognized with the first ever Youth Activist of the Year Award.

All nominees are listed below, and the winners are listed in bold.

== Special awards ==
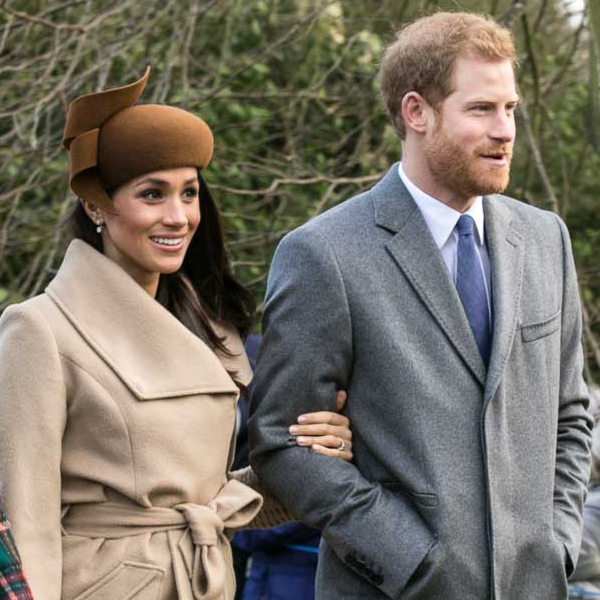
Prince Harry and Meghan, Duchess of Sussex were honored with the President's Award.

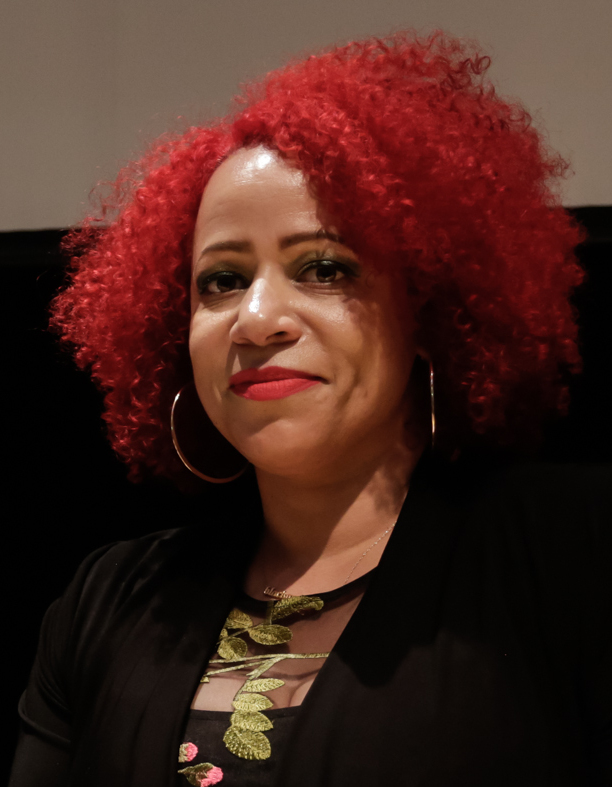
Nikole Hannah-Jones was honored with the Social Justice Impact Award.

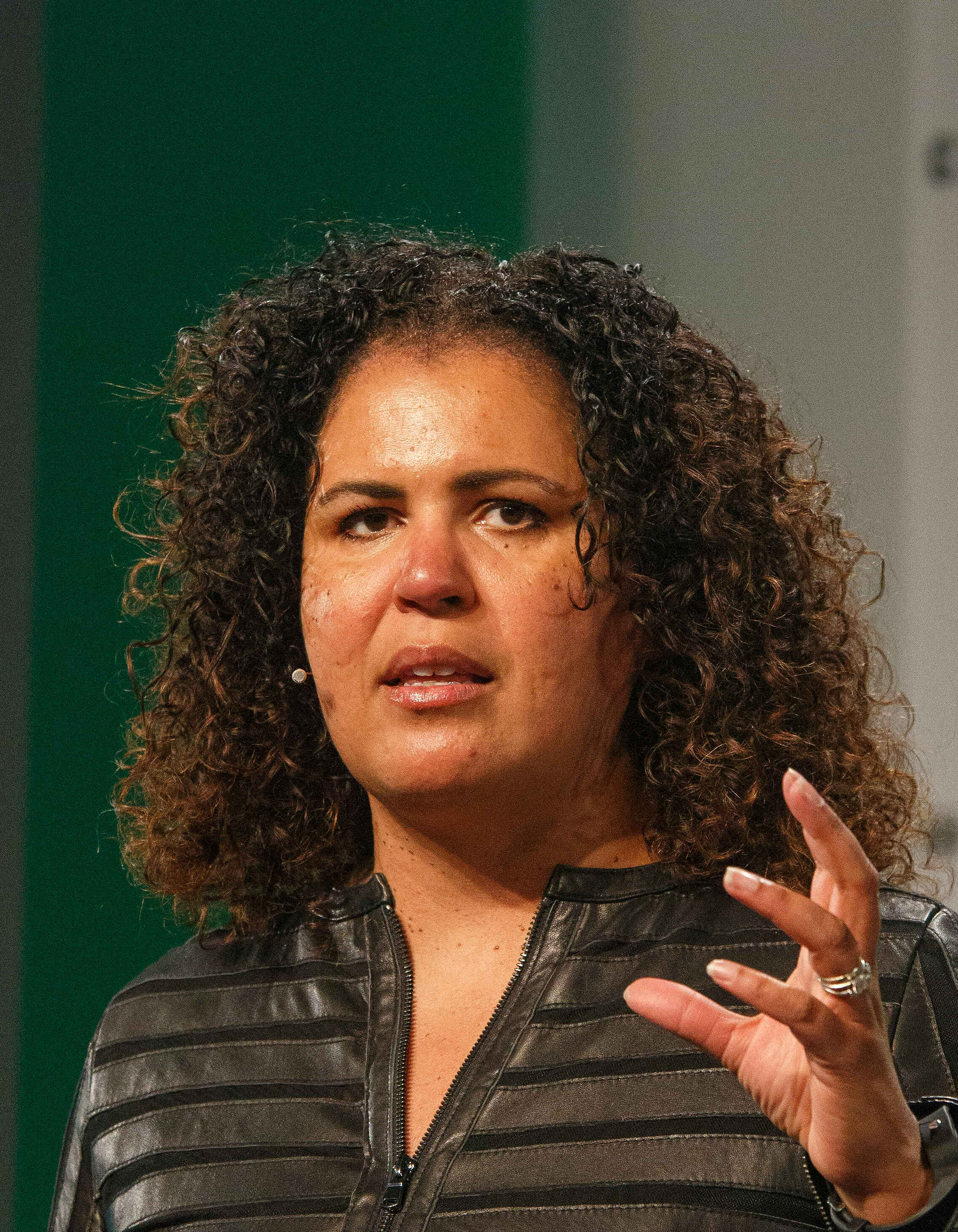
Safiya Noble was honored with the NAACP-Archewell Digital Civil Rights Award.

President's Award
- **Prince Harry, Duke of Sussex**
- **Meghan, Duchess of Sussex**
Chairman's Award
- **Samuel L. Jackson**
Vanguard Award
- **Ruth E. Carter**
Roy Wilkins Civil Rights Award
- **Mexican American Legislative Caucus**
- **Texas House Democratic Caucus**
- **Texas Legislative Black Caucus**
Entertainer of the Year
- **Jennifer Hudson**
- Lil Nas X
- Megan Thee Stallion
- Regina King
- Tiffany Haddish
Social Justice Impact Award
- **Nikole Hannah-Jones**
Youth Activist of the Year
- **Channing Hill**
Activist of the Year
- **Scot X. Esdaile**
NAACP-Archewell Digital Civil Rights Award
- **Safiya Noble**

== Motion Picture ==
Outstanding Motion Picture	Outstanding Directing in a Motion Picture
**The Harder They Fall**; Judas and the Black Messiah; King Richard; Respect; The United States vs. Billie Holiday	**Shaka King – Judas and the Black Messiah**; Denzel Washington – A Journal for Jordan; Jeymes Samuel – The Harder They Fall; Lin-Manuel Miranda – Tick, Tick... Boom!; Reinaldo Marcus Green – King Richard
Outstanding Actor in a Motion Picture	Outstanding Actress in a Motion Picture
**Will Smith – King Richard**; Denzel Washington – The Tragedy of Macbeth; Jonathan Majors – The Harder They Fall; Lakeith Stanfield – Judas and the Black Messiah; Mahershala Ali – Swan Song	**Jennifer Hudson – Respect**; Andra Day – The United States vs. Billie Holiday; Halle Berry – Bruised; Tessa Thompson – Passing; Zendaya – Malcolm & Marie
Outstanding Supporting Actor in a Motion Picture	Outstanding Supporting Actress in a Motion Picture
**Daniel Kaluuya – Judas and the Black Messiah**; Algee Smith – Judas and the Black Messiah; Delroy Lindo – The Harder They Fall; Idris Elba – The Harder They Fall; Lakeith Stanfield – The Harder They Fall	**Regina King – The Harder They Fall**; Aunjanue Ellis – King Richard; Audra McDonald – Respect; Danielle Deadwyler – The Harder They Fall; Dominique Fishback – Judas and the Black Messiah
Outstanding International Motion Picture	Outstanding Independent Motion Picture
**7 Prisoners**; African America; Eyimofe (This is My Desire); Flee; The Gravedigger's Wife	**CODA**; American Skin; Bruised; Test Pattern; The Killing of Kenneth Chamberlain
Outstanding Breakthrough Performance in a Motion Picture	Outstanding Ensemble Cast in a Motion Picture
**Danny Boyd Jr. – Bruised**; Ariana DeBose – West Side Story; Jalon Christian – A Journal for Jordan; Lonnie Chavis – The Water Man; Sheila Atim – Bruised	**The Harder They Fall**; Coming 2 America; Judas and the Black Messiah; King Richard; Respect
Outstanding Animated Motion Picture	Outstanding Character Voice Performance – Motion Picture
**Encanto**; Luca; Raya and the Last Dragon; Sing 2; Vivo	**Letitia Wright – Sing 2**; Andre Braugher – Spirit Untamed; Awkwafina – Raya and the Last Dragon; Brian Tyree Henry – Vivo; Eric André – Sing 2
Outstanding Short Form (Live Action)	Outstanding Short Form (Animated)
**When The Sun Sets (Lakutshon’ Ilanga)**; Aurinko in Adagio; Blackout; The Ice Cream Stop; These Final Hours	**Us Again**; Blush; Robin Robin; She Dreams at Sunrise; Twenty Something
Outstanding Breakthrough Creative (Motion Picture)	Outstanding Writing in a Motion Picture
**Jeymes Samuel – The Harder They Fall**; Ahmir "Questlove" Thompson – Summer of Soul; Jamila Wignot – Ailey; Liesl Tommy – Respect; Rebecca Hall – Passing	**Shaka King, Will Berson, Kenny Lucas, Keith Lucas – Judas and the Black Messiah**; Janicza Bravo, Jeremy O. Harris – Zola; Jeymes Samuel, Boaz Yakin – The Harder They Fall; Virgil Williams – A Journal for Jordan; Win Rosenfeld, Nia DaCosta, Jordan Peele – Candyman

== Television and Streaming ==
=== Drama ===
Outstanding Drama Series
**Queen Sugar**; 9-1-1; All American; Godfather of Harlem; Pose
Outstanding Actor in a Drama Series	Outstanding Actress in a Drama Series
**Sterling K. Brown – This Is Us**; Damson Idris – Snowfall; Billy Porter – Pose; Kofi Siriboe – Queen Sugar; Forest Whitaker – Godfather of Harlem	**Angela Bassett – 9-1-1**; Dawn-Lyen Gardner – Queen Sugar; Octavia Spencer – Truth Be Told; Queen Latifah – The Equalizer; Rutina Wesley – Queen Sugar
Outstanding Supporting Actor in a Drama Series	Outstanding Supporting Actress in a Drama Series
**Cliff "Method Man" Smith – Power Book II: Ghost**; Alex Hibbert – The Chi; Daniel Ezra – All American; Giancarlo Esposito – Godfather of Harlem; Joe Morton – Our Kind of People	**Mary J. Blige – Power Book II: Ghost**; Alfre Woodard – SEE; Bianca Lawson – Queen Sugar; Chandra Wilson – Grey's Anatomy; Susan Kelechi Watson – This is Us
Outstanding Directing in a Drama Series	Outstanding Writing in a Dramatic Series
**Barry Jenkins – The Underground Railroad: "Indiana Winter"**; Anthony Hemingway – Genius: Aretha: "Respect"; Carl Seaton – Snowfall: – "Fight or Flight"; Carl Seaton – Godfather of Harlem: – "The Bonanno Split"; Hanelle Culpepper – True Story: "Like Cain Did Abel"	**Davita Scarlett – The Good Fight: "And the Firm Had Two Partners"**; Aurin Squire – Evil: "C Is for Cop"; Malcolm Spellman – The Falcon and the Winter Soldier: "New World Order"; Nkechi Okoro Carroll – All American: "Homecoming"; Steven Canals, Janet Mock, Our Lady J, Brad Falchuk, Ryan Murphy – Pose: "Series Finale"

=== Comedy ===
Outstanding Comedy Series
**Insecure**; Black-ish; Harlem; Run the World; The Upshaws
Outstanding Actor in a Comedy Series	Outstanding Actress in a Comedy Series
**Anthony Anderson – black-ish**; Cedric the Entertainer – The Neighborhood; Don Cheadle – Black Monday; Elisha 'EJ' Williams – The Wonder Years; Jay Ellis – Insecure	**Issa Rae – Insecure**; Loretta Devine – Family Reunion; Regina Hall – Black Monday; Tracee Ellis Ross – Black-ish; Yvonne Orji – Insecure
Outstanding Supporting Actor in a Comedy Series	Outstanding Supporting Actress in a Comedy Series
**Deon Cole – Black-ish**; Andre Braugher – Brooklyn Nine-Nine; Kenan Thompson – Saturday Night Live; Kendrick Sampson – Insecure; Laurence Fishburne – Black-ish	**Natasha Rothwell – Insecure**; Amanda Seales – Insecure; Jenifer Lewis – Black-ish; Marsai Martin – Black-ish; Wanda Sykes – The Upshaws
Outstanding Directing in a Comedy Series	Outstanding Writing in a Comedy Series
**Bashir Salahuddin, Diallo Riddle – South Side: "Tornado"**; Melina Matsoukas – Insecure: "Reunited, Okay?!"; Neema Barnette – Harlem: "Once Upon A Time in Harlem"; Prentice Penny – Insecure: "Everything's Gonna Be, Okay?!"; Tiffani Johnson – Black Monday: "Eight!"	**Issa Rae – Insecure: "Everything's Gonna Be, Okay?!"**; Ashley Nicole Black – Ted Lasso: "Do the Right-est Thing"; Leann Bowen – Ted Lasso: "Lavender"; Maya Erskine – PEN15: "Blue in Green"; Temi Wilkey – Sex Education: "Episode #3.6"

=== Television Movie, Limited-Series or Dramatic Special ===
Outstanding Television Movie, Mini-Series or Dramatic Special
**Colin in Black & White**; Genius: Aretha; Love Life; Robin Roberts Presents: Mahalia; The Underground Railroad
Outstanding Actor in a Television Movie, Mini-Series or Dramatic Special	Outstanding Actress in a Television Movie, Mini-Series or Dramatic Special
**Kevin Hart – True Story**; Anthony Mackie – Solos; Jaden Michael – Colin in Black & White; Wesley Snipes – True Story; William Jackson Harper – Love Life	**Taraji P. Henson – Annie Live!**; Betty Gabriel – Clickbait; Cynthia Erivo – Genius: Aretha; Danielle Brooks – Robin Roberts Presents: Mahalia; Jodie Turner-Smith – Anne Boleyn
Outstanding Supporting Actor in a Television Movie, Limited-Series or Dramatic Special	Outstanding Supporting Actress in a Television Movie, Limited-Series or Dramatic Special
**Courtney B. Vance – Genius: Aretha**; Keith David – Black as Night; Tituss Burgess – Annie Live!; Will Catlett – True Story; William Jackson Harper – The Underground Railroad	**Regina Hall – Nine Perfect Strangers**; Anika Noni Rose – Maid; Natasha Rothwell – The White Lotus; Pauletta Washington – Genius: Aretha; Sheila Atim – The Underground Railroad
Outstanding Directing in a Television Movie or Special	Outstanding Writing in a Television Movie or Special
**Kenny Leon – Robin Roberts Presents: Mahalia**; Jaffar Mahmood – Hot Mess Holiday; Mario Van Peebles – Salt-N-Pepa; Maritte Lee Go – Black As Night; Verónica Rodríguez – Let's Get Merried	**Abdul Williams – Salt-N-Pepa**; Mario Miscione, Marcella Ochoa – Madres; Monique N. Matthew – A Holiday in Harlem; Sameer Gardezi – Hot Mess Holiday; Sherman Payne – Black as Night

=== Overall Acting ===
Outstanding Performance by a Youth (Series, Special, Television Movie or Limited-series)	Outstanding Guest Actor or Actress in a Television Series
**Miles Brown – Black-ish**; Alayah "That Girl Lay Lay" High – That Girl Lay Lay; Celina Smith – Annie Live!; Elisha 'EJ' Williams – The Wonder Years; Eris Baker – This Is Us	**Maya Rudolph – Saturday Night Live**; Alani "La La" Anthony – The Chi; Christina Elmore – Insecure; Daniel Kaluuya – Saturday Night Live; Erika Alexander – Run the World

=== Reality and Variety ===
Outstanding Talk Series	Outstanding Reality Program, Reality Competition Series or Game Show
**Red Table Talk**; Desus & Mero; Hart to Heart; Tamron Hall; The Real	**Wild 'n Out**; Celebrity Family Feud; Iyanla: Fix My Life; Sweet Life: Los Angeles; The Voice
Outstanding News / Information – (Series or Special)	Outstanding Host in a Talk or News / Information (Series or Special)
**The ReidOut**; Blood on Black Wall Street: The Legacy of the Tulsa Massacre; NBC Nightly News with Lester Holt; Soul of a Nation; Unsung	**Jada Pinkett Smith, Adrienne Banfield-Norris, Willow Smith – Red Table Talk**; Joy Reid – The Reidout; Daniel "Desus Nice" Baker, Joel "The Kid Mero" Martinez – Desus & Mero; Garcelle Beauvais, Adrienne Bailon, Loni Love, Jeannie Mai – The Real; LeBron James – The Shop: Uninterrupted
Outstanding Variety Show (Series or Special)	Outstanding Host in a Reality, Game Show or Variety (Series or Special)
**The Daily Show with Trevor Noah**; A Black Lady Sketch Show; BET Awards 2021; Dave Chappelle: The Closer; Savage X Fenty Show Vol. 3	**Trevor Noah – The Daily Show with Trevor Noah**; Alfonso Ribeiro – America's Funniest Home Videos; Amber Ruffin – The Amber Ruffin Show; Cedric the Entertainer – 73rd Primetime Emmy Awards; Iyanla Vanzant – Iyanla: Fix My Life

=== Other categories ===
Outstanding Short-Form Series (Drama or Comedy)	Outstanding Short-Form Series – Reality/Nonfiction
**Between the Scenes – The Daily Show**; Dark Humor; Della Mae; The Disney Launchpad: Shorts Incubator; Two Sides: Unfaithful	**Lynching Postcards: Token of a Great Day**; Life By The Horns; Memory Builds The Monument; Widen the Screen: 8:46 Films; Through Our Eyes: Shelter
Outstanding Breakthrough Creative (Television)	Outstanding Children's Program
**Angel Kristi Williams – Colin in Black & White**; Cierra Glaude – Queen Sugar; Deborah Riley Draper – The Legacy of Black Wall Street; Halcyon Person – Karma's World; Quyen Tran – Maid	**Family Reunion**; Ada Twist, Scientist; Karma's World; Raven's Home; Waffles + Mochi
Outstanding Animated Series	Outstanding Character Voice-Over Performance (Television)
**We the People**; Big Mouth; Peanut Headz: Black History Toonz; Super Sema; Yasuke	**Cree Summer – Rugrats**; Angela Bassett – Malika: The Lion Queen; Billy Porter – Fairfax; Ludacris – Karma's World; Keke Palmer – Big Mouth

== Recording ==
Outstanding Album	Outstanding New Artist
**Heaux Tales – Jazmine Sullivan**; An Evening with Silk Sonic – Silk Sonic; Back of My Mind – H.E.R.; Certified Lover Boy – Drake; When It's All Said and Done... Take Time – Giveon	**Saweetie**; Cynthia Erivo; Jimmie Allen; Tems; Zoe Wees
Outstanding Male Artist	Outstanding Female Artist
**Anthony Hamilton**; Drake; Giveon; J. Cole; Lil Nas X	**Jazmine Sullivan**; H.E.R.; Ari Lennox; Beyoncé; Chlöe
Outstanding Duo, Group or Collaboration (Traditional)	Outstanding Duo, Group or Collaboration (Contemporary)
**Leave the Door Open – Silk Sonic**; Superstar – Anthony Hamilton feat. Jennifer Hudson; Georgia on my Mind – Chloe x Halle; Girl like Me – Jazmine Sullivan feat. H.E.R.; Complicated (Remix) – Leela James feat. Anthony Hamilton	**Fye Fye – Tobe Nwigwe feat. Fat Nwigwe**; Go Crazy (Remix) – Chris Brown feat. Young Thug, Future, Lil Durk and Latto; Kiss Me More – Doja Cat feat. SZA; Way 2 Sexy – Drake feat. Young Thug and Future; Come Through – H.E.R. feat. Chris Brown
Outstanding Music Video/Visual Album	Outstanding Soundtrack/Compilation Album
**Essence – Wizkid feat. Tems**; Best Friend – Saweetie feat. Doja Cat; Fye Fye – Tobe Nwigwe feat. Fat Nwigwe; Have Mercy – Chlöe; Leave the Door Open – Silk Sonic	**The Harder They Fall Soundtrack – Jay-Z, Jeymes Samuel**; Coming 2 America Soundtrack – Eddie Murphy, Craig Brewer, Kevin Misher, Randy Spendlove, Jeff Charleston; Judas and the Black Messiah Soundtrack – Mark Isham, Craig Harris; Respect Soundtrack – Jason Michael Webb, Stephen Bray; The United States vs. Billie Holiday Soundtrack – Salaam Remi, Andra Day, Raphael Saadiq, Warren Felder
Outstanding Gospel/Christian Album	Outstanding Gospel/Christian Song
**Overcomer – Tamela Mann**; Anthems & Glory – Todd Dulaney; Believe For It – CeCe Winans; Jonny x Mali: Live in L.A. – Jonathan McReynolds, Mali Music; Power – Jason McGee, The Choir	**Help Me – Tamela Mann feat. The Fellas**; Believe For It – CeCe Winans; Hold Us Together (Hope Mix) – H.E.R. and Tauren Wells; Overcome 2021 – Kirk Franklin; Time for Reparations – Sounds of Blackness
Outstanding Jazz Album – Instrumental	Outstanding Jazz Album – Vocal
**Sounds from the Ancestors – Kenny Garrett**; Forever...Jaz – Jazmin Ghent; Love Languages – Nathan Mitchell; Somewhere Different – Brandee Younger; The Magic of Now – Orrin Evans	**Generations – The Baylor Project**; Dear Love – Jazzmeia Horn and Her Noble Force; Ledisi Sings Nina – Ledisi; Let There Be Love – Freda Payne; SALSWING! – Rubén Blades y Roberto Delgado & Orquesta
Outstanding Soul/R&B Song	Outstanding Hip Hop/Rap Song
**Pick Up Your Feelings – Jazmine Sullivan**; Damage – H.E.R.; Be Alive – Beyoncé; Have Mercy – Chlöe; Leave the Door Open – Silk Sonic	**Fye Fye – Tobe Nwigwe feat. Fat Nwigwe**; Best Friend – Saweetie feat. Doja Cat; Industry Baby – Lil Nas X feat. Jack Harlow; My Life – J. Cole, 21 Savage, Morray; Way 2 Sexy – Drake
Outstanding International Song
**Essence – Wizkid feat. Tems and Justin Bieber**; Peru – Fireboy DML; Somebody's Son – Tiwa Savage feat. Brandy; Touch It – KiDi; Understand – Omah Lay

== Podcast and social media ==
Outstanding News and Information Podcast	Outstanding Lifestyle/Self-Help Podcast
**Blindspot: Tulsa Burning**; #SundayCivics; After the Uprising: The Death of Danyé Dion Jones; Into America; Un(re)solved	**Two Funny Mamas: Sherri Shepherd & Kym Whitley – Sherri Shepherd, Kym Whitley**; Checking in with Michelle Williams – Michelle Williams; The Homecoming Podcast with Dr. Thema – Thema Bryant; The SonRise Project Podcast – Kelli Richardson Lawson; Under Construction w/ Tamar Braxton – Tamar Braxton
Outstanding Society and Culture Podcast	Outstanding Arts and Entertainment Podcast
**Jemele Hill is Unbothered**; Beyond the Scenes – The Daily Show; Professional Troublemaker; Questlove Supreme; Super Soul Podcast	**Jemele Hill is Unbothered**; Club Shay Shay podcast with Shannon Sharpe; Questlove Supreme; Reasonably Shady; The History of Sketch Comedy with Keegan-Michael Key
Social Media Personality of the Year
Eunique Jones Gibson; Kevin Frederick; **Laron Hines**; Lanae Vanee; Terrell Grice; RackaRacka

== Literary ==
Outstanding Literary Work – Fiction	Outstanding Literary Work – Nonfiction
**Long Division – Kiese Laymon**; Harlem Shuffle – Colson Whitehead; Libertie – Kaitlyn Greenidge; The Man Who Lived Underground – Richard Wright; The Perishing – Natashia Deón	**The 1619 Project: A New Origin Story – Nikole Hannah-Jones**; Dance Theatre of Harlem – Judy Tyrus, Paul Novosel; Just As I Am – Cicely Tyson; My Remarkable Journey – Katherine Johnson; Renegades: Born in the USA – Barack Obama, Bruce Springsteen
Outstanding Literary Work – Debut Author	Outstanding Literary Work – Biography/Autobiography
**Just As I Am – Cicely Tyson**; My Remarkable Journey – Katherine Johnson; Other Black Girl: A Novel – Zakiya Dalila Harris; The Love Songs of W.E.B. Du Bois – Honorée Fanonne Jeffers; Wake: The Hidden History of Women-Led Slave Revolts – Rebecca Hall	**Will – Will Smith**; Just As I Am – Cicely Tyson; Unbound: My Story of Liberation and the Birth of the Me Too Movement – Tarana Burke; Unprotected: A Memoir – Billy Porter; Until I Am Free – Keisha N. Blain
Outstanding Literary Work – Instructional	Outstanding Literary Work – Poetry
**Feeding the Soul (Because It's My Business) – Tabitha Brown**; Diversity Is Not Enough: A Roadmap to Recruit, Develop and Promote Black Leaders in America – Keith Wyche; Permission to Dream – Chris Gardner; Teaching Black History to White People – Leonard N. Moore; The Conversation: How Seeking and Speaking the Truth About Racism Can Radically Transform Individuals and Organizations – Robert Livingston	**Perfect Black – Crystal Wilkinson**; Playlist for the Apocalypse – Rita Dove; Such Color: New and Selected Poems – Tracy K. Smith; The Wild Fox of Yemen – Threa Almontaser; What Water Knows: Poems – Jacqueline Jones LaMon
Outstanding Literary Work – Children	Outstanding Literary Work – Youth/Teens
**Stacey's Extraordinary Words – Stacey Abrams, Kit Thomas**; Black Ballerinas: My Journey to Our Legacy – Misty Copeland; Change Sings – Amanda Gorman, Loren Long; Time for Bed, Old House – Janet Costa Bates, A.G. Ford; When Langston Dances – Kaija Langley, Keith Mallett	**Ace of Spades – Faridah Àbíké-Íyímídé**; Happily Ever Afters – Elise Bryant; The Cost of Knowing – Brittney Morris; When You Look Like Us – Pamela N. Harris; Wings of Ebony – J. Elle
