= NAACP Image Award for Outstanding Writing in a Motion Picture =

American film award

This article lists the winners and nominees for the NAACP Image Award for Outstanding Writing in a Motion Picture. The award was first presented in 2008.

== Winners and nominees ==
For each year in the tables below, the winner is listed first and highlighted in bold.

=== 2000s ===
Year	Director(s)	Film	Ref
2008	**Rick Famuyiwa, Michael Genet**	**Talk to Me**	
2008	Steven Zaillian	American Gangster	
2008	Richard LaGravenese	Freedom Writers	
2008	Robert Eisele	The Great Debaters	
2008	John Sayles	Honeydripper	
2009	**Jenny Lumet**	**Rachel Getting Married**	
2009	Darnell Martin	Cadillac Records	
2009	Patrik-Ian Polk, John R. Gordon	Noah's Arc: Jumping the Broom	
2009	Paris Qualles	A Raisin in the Sun	
2009	Gina Prince-Bythewood	The Secret Life of Bees	

=== 2010s ===
Year	Director(s)	Film	Ref
2010	**Geoffrey S. Fletcher**	**Precious**	
2010	Tyler Perry	I Can Do Bad All by Myself	
2010	Anthony Peckham	Invictus	
2010	Reggie Rock Bythewood, Cheo Hodari Coker	Notorious	
2010	John Lee Hancock	The Blind Side	
2011	**Michael Elliot**	**Just Wright**	
2011	Mary King, Jonathan Watters, Cheryl Edwards, Joe Shrapnel, Marko King, Anna Waterhouse	Frankie and Alice	
2011	Tyler Perry	Why Did I Get Married Too?	
2011	Michael C. Martin	Brooklyn's Finest	
2011	Rodrigo García	Mother and Child	
2012	**Ann Peacock**	**The First Grader**	
2012	Alrick Brown	Kinyarwanda	
2012	Dee Rees	Pariah	
2012	Elizabeth Hunter, Arlene ilibbs	Jumping The Broom	
2012	Tate Taylor	The Help	
2013	**Elizabeth Hunter**	**Abducted: The Carlina White Story**	
2013	John Gatins	Flight	
2013	John Ridley, Aaron McGruder	Red Tails	
2013	Keith Merryman, David A. Newman	Think Like A Man	
2013	Ol Parker	The Best Exotic Marigold Hotel	
2014	**John Ridley**	**12 Years a Slave**	
2014	Alfonso Cuarón, Jonás Cuarón	Gravity	
2014	Ryan Coogler	Fruitvale Station	
2014	Danny Strong	The Butler	
2014	Brian Helgeland	42	
2015	**Misan Sagay**	**Belle**	
2015	Chris Rock	Top Five	
2015	Justin Simien	Dear White People	
2015	Margaret Nagle	The Good Lie	
2015	Richard Wenk	The Equalizer	
2016	**Ryan Coogler and Aaron Covington**	**Creed**	
2016	Andrea Berloff and Jonathan Herman and Alan Wenkus	Straight Outta Compton	
2016	Christopher Cleveland, Bettina Gilois, and Grant Thompson	McFarland USA	
2016	Rick Famuyiwa	Dope	
2017	**Barry Jenkins**	**Moonlight**	
2017	Adam Mansbach	Barry	
2017	Nate Parker	The Birth of a Nation	
2017	Jeff Nichols	Loving	
2017	Richard Tanne	Southside With You	
2018	**Jordan Peele**	**Get Out**	
2018	Kenya Barris and Tracy Oliver	Girls Trip	
2018	Mark Boal	Detroit	
2018	Emily V. Gordon and Kumail Nanjiani	The Big Sick	
2018	Dee Rees and Virgil Williams	Mudbound	
2019	**Ryan Coogler and Joe Robert Cole**	**Black Panther**	
2019	Peter Chiarelli and Adele Lim	Crazy Rich Asians	
2019	Barry Jenkins	If Beale Street Could Talk	
2019	Boots Riley	Sorry to Bother You	
2019	Charlie Wachtel, David Rabinowitz, Kevin Willmott and Spike Lee	BlacKkKlansman	

=== 2020s ===
Year	Director(s)	Film	Ref
2020	**Jordan Peele**	**Us**	
2020	Doug Atchison	Brian Banks	
2020	Chinonye Chukwu	Clemency	
2020	Destin Daniel Cretton	Just Mercy	
2020	Kasi Lemmons Gregory Allen Howard (screenwriter)	Harriet	
2021	**Radha Blank**	**The Forty-Year-Old Version**	
2021	David E. Talbert	Jingle Jangle: A Christmas Journey	
2021	Kemp Powers	One Night in Miami...	
2021	Lee Isaac Chung	Minari	
2021	Pete Docter, Kemp Powers, Mike Jones	Soul	
2022	**Shaka King, Will Berson, Kenny Lucas, Keith Lucas**	**Judas and the Black Messiah**	
2022	Janicza Bravo and Jeremy O. Harris	Zola	
2022	Jeymes Samuel and Boaz Yakin	The Harder They Fall	
2022	Virgil Williams	A Journal for Jordan	
2022	Win Rosenfeld, Nia DaCosta, and Jordan Peele	Candyman	
2023	**Ryan Coogler**	**Black Panther: Wakanda Forever**	
2023	Charles Murray	The Devil You Know	
2023	Dana Stevens, Maria Bello	The Woman King	
2023	Jordan Peele	Nope	
2023	Krystin Ver Linden	Alice	
2024	**Cord Jefferson**	**American Fiction**	
2024	A.V. Rockwell	A Thousand and One	
2024	Juel Taylor, Tony Rettenmaier	They Cloned Tyrone	
2024	Maggie Betts, Doug Wright	The Burial	
2024	Marcus Gardley	The Color Purple	
2025	**RaMell Ross, Joslyn Barnes**	**Nickel Boys**	
2025	Barry Jenkins	The Fire Inside	
2025	Steve McQueen	Blitz	
2025	Titus Kaphar	Exhibiting Forgiveness	
2025	Virgil Williams, Malcolm Washington	The Piano Lesson	

== Multiple wins and nominations ==
=== Wins ===
3 wins

- Ryan Coogler

2 wins

- Jordan Peele

=== Nominations ===
3 nominations

- Ryan Coogler
- Jordan Peele

2 nominations

- Rick Famuyiwa
- Tyler Perry
- Dee Rees
- Elizabeth Hunter
- John Ridley
- Barry Jenkins
