= Paul Selvin Award =

Award by the Writers Guild of America

Writers Guild of America Paul Selvin Award
- Country: United States
- Presented by: Writers Guild of America
- First award: 1990
- Currently held by: Cord Jefferson for American Fiction (2023)
- Website: http://www.wga.org/

The Paul Selvin Award is a special award presented by the Writers Guild of America. It is given to the script that "best embodies the spirit of the constitutional and civil rights and liberties which are indispensable to the survival of free writers everywhere and to whose defense Paul Selvin committed his professional life." With the exception of 2007 in which no award was given, it has been presented annually since the 42nd Writers Guild of America Awards in 1990. No writer has won more than one award.

== Winners ==
=== Notes ===
- The year indicates when the film was released. The awards are presented the following year.

=== 1980s ===
Year	Film	Writer(s)
1989 (42nd)	Roe vs. Wade	Alison Cross

=== 1990s ===
Year	Film	Writer(s)
1990 (43rd)	Heat Wave	Michael Lazarou
1991 (44th)	Separate But Equal (Miniseries, Episodes "Part I" and "Part II")	George Stevens Jr.
1992 (45th)	Guilty Until Proven Innocent	Cynthia Whitcomb
1993 (46th)	Dave	Gary Ross
1994 (47th)	Witness to the Execution	Thomas Baum, Priscilla Prestwidge & Keith Pierce
1995 (48th)	Picket Fences (Episode "Final Judgement")	David E. Kelley
1996 (49th)	The People vs. Larry Flynt	Scott Alexander and Larry Karaszewski
1997 (50th)	Rosewood	Gregory Poirier
1998 (51st)	Blind Faith	Frank Military
1999 (52nd)	The Insider	Eric Roth and Michael Mann

=== 2000s ===
Year	Film	Writer(s)
2000 (53rd)	Quills	Doug Wright
2001 (54th)	For Love or Country: The Arturo Sandoval Story	Timothy J. Sexton
2002 (55th)	The Matthew Shepard Story	John Wierick and Jacob Krueger
2003 (56th)	The Pentagon Papers	Jason Horwitch
2004 (57th)	The Simpsons (Episode "Fraudcast News")	Don Payne
2005 (58th)	Good Night, and Good Luck	George Clooney and Grant Heslov
2006 (59th)	No award given	
2007 (60th)	The Great Debaters	Robert Eisele and Jeffrey Porro
2008 (61st)	Milk	Dustin Lance Black
2009 (62nd)	Invictus	Anthony Peckham

=== 2010s ===
Year	Film	Writer(s)
2010 (63rd)	Fair Game	Jez Butterworth & John-Henry Butterworth
2011 (64th)	The Help	Tate Taylor
2012 (65th)	Lincoln	Tony Kushner
2013 (66th)	We Steal Secrets: The Story of WikiLeaks	Alex Gibney
2014 (67th)	The Good Lie	Margaret Nagle
2015 (68th)	Trumbo	John McNamara
2016 (69th)	Confirmation	Susannah Grant
2017 (70th)	The Post	Liz Hannah and Josh Singer
2018 (71st)	Vice	Adam McKay
2019 (72nd)	Bombshell	Charles Randolph

=== 2020s ===
Year	Film	Writer(s)
2020 (73rd)	Judas and the Black Messiah	Will Berson, Shaka King, and Kenny and Keith Lucas
2021 (74th)	The Underground Railroad	Barry Jenkins
2022 (75th)	She Said	Rebecca Lenkiewicz
2023 (76th)	American Fiction	Cord Jefferson
2024 (77th)	Nickel Boys	RaMell Ross and Joslyn Barnes
2025 (78th)	2000 Meters to Andriivka	Mstyslav Chernov

== Types of winners ==
The Paul Selvin Award has been awarded to various platforms of film and television. 21 theatrical films have received the award, along with 8 television films, 2 individual episodes of a television series, 2 miniseries, and 1 documentary.
