= Charlese Antoinette Jones =

American costume designer for film and television

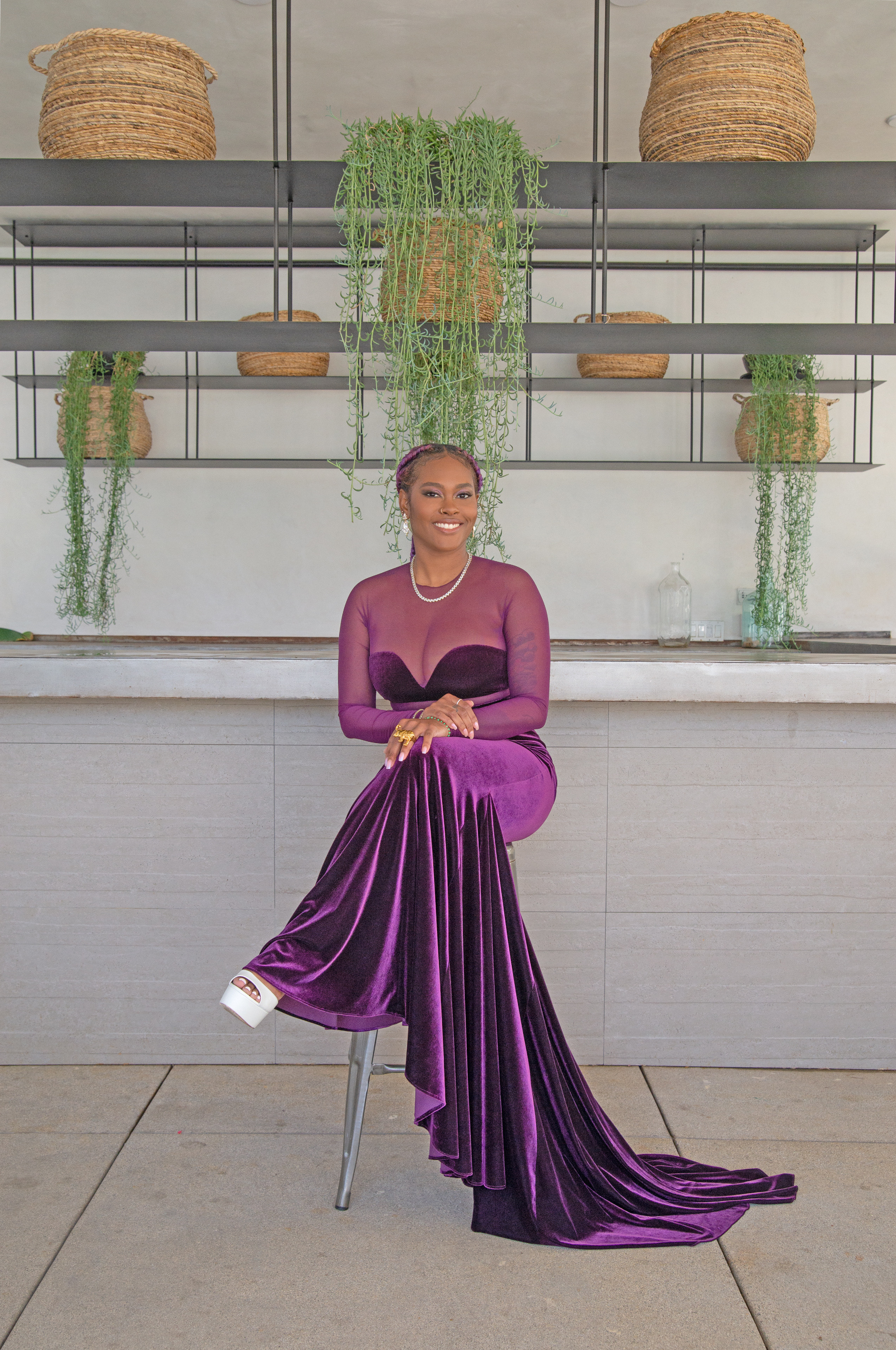
- Occupation: Costume designer
- Years active: 2009–present

Charlese Antoinette Jones is an American costume designer for film and television. She is best known for her work on Raising Dion, Astronomy Club: The Sketch Show and Judas and the Black Messiah.

== Career ==
Charlese began her costume designer career as an intern on Solitary Man in 2009. She made her debut as a costume designer with the feature film Newlyweeds, directed by Shaka King in 2013. She is a member of the Academy of Motion Picture Arts and Sciences, which awards the Oscar and a member of the Costume Designers Guild. She is the founder of the Black Designer Database.

== Filmography ==
- 2023 - Air
- 2022 - Whitney Houston: I Wanna Dance with Somebody
- 2022 - Nanny
- 2021 - Judas and the Black Messiah
- 2019 - Astronomy Club: The Sketch Show
- 2019 - Raising Dion
- 2019 - See You Yesterday
- 2018 - Ride
- 2018 - Sprinter
- 2016 - Sticky Notes
- 2016 - Vincent N Roxxy
- 2016 - Little Boxes
- 2015 - Addicted to Fresno
- 2013 - The Inevitable Defeat of Mister & Pete
- 2013 - Newlyweeds

== Awards and nominations ==
Year	Result	Award	Category	Work	Ref.
2021	Nominated	Costume Designers Guild	Excellence in Period Film	Judas and the Black Messiah	
2024	Nominated	NAACP Image Award	Outstanding Costume Design (Television or Film)	Air	
