= Kenny and Keith Lucas =

American comedy and writing duo

The Lucas Brothers
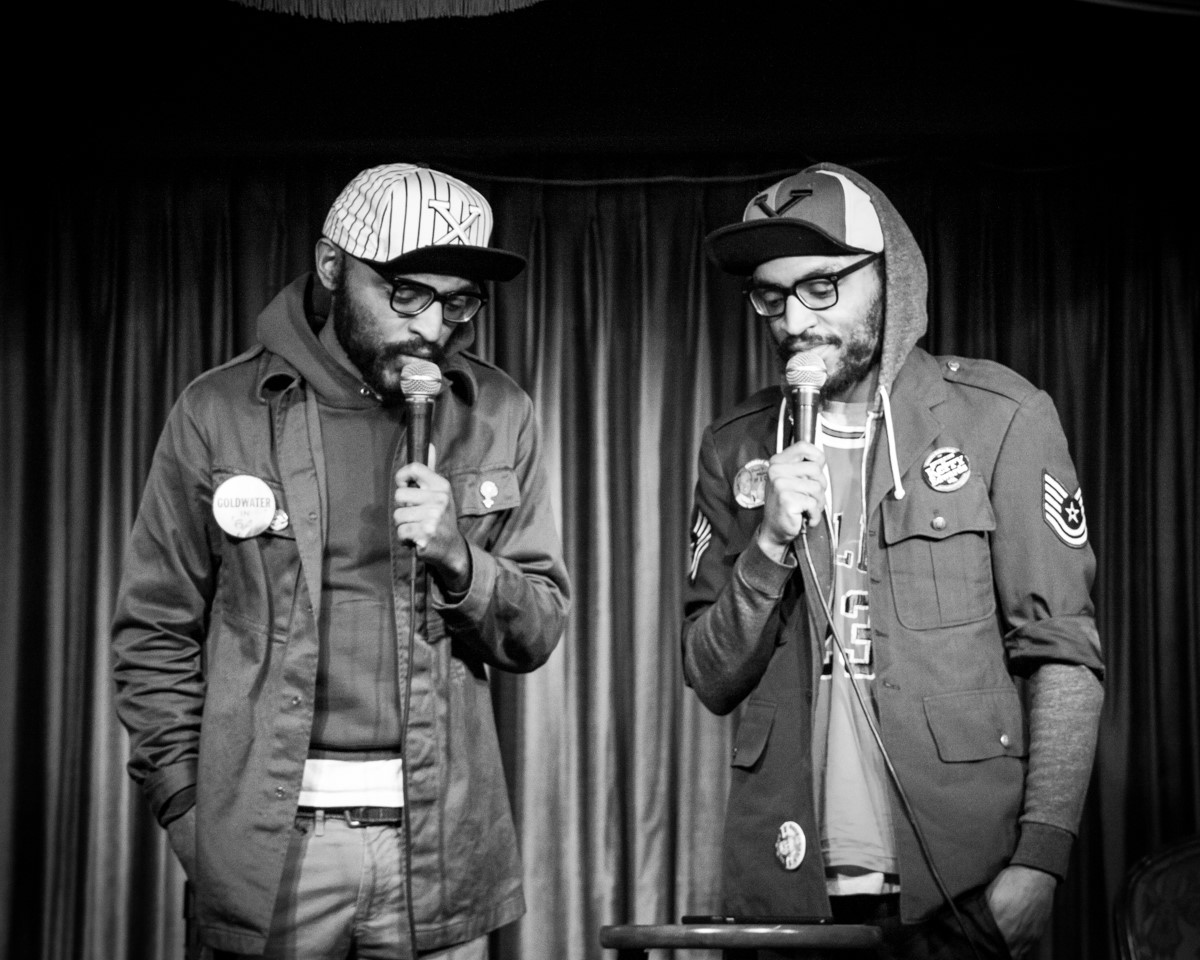
- The Lucas Bros - photo by Lindsey Byrnes
- Born: September 13, 1985 (age 41); Newark, New Jersey, U.S.
- Occupations: Screenwriters; filmmakers; producers; actors; comedians
- Years active: 2011–present
- Notable work: Lucas Bros. Moving Co., Judas and the Black Messiah

Comedy career
- Medium: Stand-up, film, television
- Genres: Observational comedy; black comedy; political comedy; satire; surreal humor; improv; alternative comedy
- Subjects: African-American culture; American politics; current events; pop culture; race relations; philosophy

Kenny Lucas and Keith Lucas (born September 13, 1985), collectively referred to as The Lucas Brothers, are American identical twin brothers who work together as writers, filmmakers, producers, actors, and comedians.

They co-wrote and co-produced Judas and the Black Messiah (2021), for which they were nominated for the Academy Award for Best Original Screenplay and the Writers Guild of America Award for Best Original Screenplay; they won the Paul Selvin Award and the NAACP Image Award for Outstanding Writing in a Motion Picture. The film itself was nominated for six Academy Awards, including the Academy Award for Best Picture.

== Early lives ==
The Lucas Brothers were born and raised in Newark, New Jersey. They also spent some time in High Point, North Carolina. They moved to Irvington, New Jersey and both graduated from Irvington High School.

The brothers both graduated with honors from the College of New Jersey in 2007 with degrees in philosophy. Kenny attended New York University School of Law and Keith attended Duke University School of Law until the final week of their third year of law school, when they dropped out to pursue stand-up comedy full-time.

The Lucas Bros were inducted into Phi Beta Kappa honors society as alumni members by The College of New Jersey in 2022.

== Career ==
They made their late-night debut on Late Night with Jimmy Fallon in 2012, and have appeared as guests multiple times after. The duo created the animated series Lucas Bros. Moving Co.. They starred in truTV's series Friends of the People. They appeared in the feature film 22 Jump Street (2014). In July 2014, they made Variety magazine's "Ten Comics to Watch in 2014" list. The brothers also appeared in episodes of the highly acclaimed Fox TV series The Grinder in 2016 and have played themselves in the Netflix series Lady Dynamite.

The Lucas Brothers released their first comedy special, On Drugs, on Netflix in April 2017. Paste ranked it as the 9th best comedy special of 2017.

They have additionally provided content for Fox and the associated YouTube channel Animation Domination High-Def including the short-form web-series OG Sherlock Kush starring Peter Serafinowicz and Rich Fulcher.

More recently, the Lucas Brothers co-wrote and co-produced Judas and the Black Messiah (2021), the biopic of Fred Hampton, which was co-written, along with Will Berson, and directed by Shaka King. For their contributions, the Lucas Brothers received nominations for the Academy Award for Best Original Screenplay and the Writers Guild of America Award for Best Original Screenplay. They won the Paul Selvin Award and the NAACP Image Award for Outstanding Writing in a Motion Picture.

They are also developing a comedy project with Phil Lord and Christopher Miller, who directed 22 Jump Street. In addition, they are set to write and star in a semi-autobiographical film to be produced by Judd Apatow.

They are paid regulars at the Comedy Cellar.

== Filmography ==
=== Actors ===
Year	Title	Kenny's role	Keith's role	Notes
2013	Arrested Development	Lucas Brother No. 2	Lucas Brother No. 1	Episode: "Blockheads"
2013–2015	Lucas Bros. Moving Co.	Kenny (voice)	Keef (voice)	Also writers and producers
2014	22 Jump Street	Kenny Yang	Keith Yang	
2014–2015	Friends of the People	Various		Also writers and producers
2016	The Grinder	Cory Manler	Second Cory Manler	Kenny: 4 episodes, Keith: 1 episode
2016	Lady Dynamite	Themselves		4 episodes
2017	Lucas Brothers: On Drugs	Themselves		Netflix special
2017	The High Court with Doug Benson	Guest Bailiff		TV short
2017	Dope State	Craig	Jake	Documentary series
2018	The History of Comedy	Themselves		1 episode; documentary series
2018	Crashing	Themselves		Episode: "Too Good"
2019	Sherman's Showcase	Themselves		2 episodes
2022	That Damn Michael Che	Themselves		Episode: "Higher Power"
2024	Babes	Benny	Bobby	
2024	Krapopolis	Adrian (voice)	Adrian (voice)	Episode: "Remedial Archaeology"

=== Writers ===
Year	Title	Kenny	Keith	Notes
2013–2015	Lucas Bros Moving Co	Yes	Yes	17 episodes
2017	Lucas Brothers: On Drugs	Yes	Yes	Stand-up special
2019	In Other Words	Yes	No	Short film
2020	It's Personal with Amy Hoggart	Yes	Yes	8 episodes
2021	Judas and the Black Messiah	Yes	Yes	Film writing debut Story by and co-producers Nominated - Academy Award for Best Original Screenplay
