= Takkarist McKinley =

American football player (born 1995)

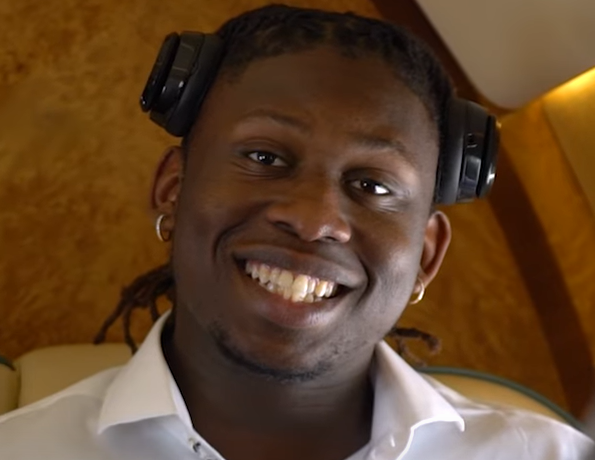
- McKinley in 2017

Profile
- Position: Defensive end

Personal information
- Born: November 2, 1995 (age 31); Oakland, California, U.S.
- Listed height: 6 ft 2 in (1.88 m)
- Listed weight: 250 lb (113 kg)

Career information
- High school: John F. Kennedy (Richmond, California)
- College: UCLA (2014–2016)
- NFL draft: 2017: 1st round, 26th overall pick

Career history
- Atlanta Falcons (2017–2020); Las Vegas Raiders (2020); Cleveland Browns (2021); Tennessee Titans (2022)*; Los Angeles Rams (2022); Dallas Cowboys (2022); New York Jets (2024)
- * Offseason or practice squad member only

Awards and highlights
- First-team All-Pac-12 (2016)

Career NFL statistics as of 2024
- Total tackles: 107
- Sacks: 20.5
- Forced fumbles: 3
- Fumble recoveries: 1
- Pass deflections: 2
- Stats at Pro Football Reference

Takkarist Jaune McKinley (born November 2, 1995) is an American professional football defensive end. He played college football for the UCLA Bruins and was selected by the Atlanta Falcons in the first round of the 2017 NFL draft.

== Early life ==
McKinley attended Kennedy High School in Richmond, California. He played for the Eagles football team. He had 50 tackles and 15 sacks as a junior and 60 tackles and 11 sacks as a senior. He also ran track in high school.

== College career ==
McKinley originally committed to the University of California, Berkeley but was ruled a non-qualifier and attended Contra Costa College. During his one season at Contra Costa College in 2013, he had 33 tackles and 10 sacks. In September 2014, he transferred to the University of California, Los Angeles (UCLA). He played in 10 games that season, making one start, and finished the year with 2.5 sacks. As a junior in 2015, McKinley started 12 of 13 games, recording 35 tackles and 3.5 sacks. As a senior in 2016, he recorded 10 sacks.

== Professional career ==
=== Pre-draft ===
Pre-draft measurables
Height	Weight	Arm length	Hand span	40-yard dash	10-yard split	20-yard split	20-yard shuttle	Three-cone drill	Vertical jump	Broad jump	Bench press
6 ft 2 in (1.88 m)	250 lb (113 kg)	34 3/4 in (0.88 m)	9 3/4 in (0.25 m)	4.59 s	1.60 s	2.67 s	4.62 s	7.48 s	33 in (0.84 m)	10 ft 2 in (3.10 m)	24 reps
All values from NFL Combine

McKinley was invited to the NFL Combine as an outside linebacker and completed all the combine drills except for the short shuttle and three-cone drill. He underwent surgery to repair a torn labrum and a fracture in his shoulder socket after the combine. His recovery time was expected to take four to six months, making him unable to participate at UCLA's Pro Day. NFL draft analysts projected McKinley to be selected within the first two rounds.

=== Atlanta Falcons ===
McKinley was selected by the Atlanta Falcons in the first round (26th overall) of the 2017 NFL draft. On May 11, McKinley signed a four-year, $10.21 million contract with $7.89 million guaranteed and a signing bonus of $5.57 million. He played in all 16 games, recording 20 tackles and six sacks, good for fourth in the league among rookies and second on the team behind Adrian Clayborn.

In Week 4 of the 2018 season, against the Cincinnati Bengals, McKinley recorded a career-high three sacks in a 37–36 loss. He finished the season with 22 combined tackles and a team-high seven sacks. In 2019, McKinley played in 14 games with 13 starts, recording 29 tackles and 3.5 sacks. He suffered a shoulder injury in Week 15 and was placed on injured reserve on December 17, 2019. On April 29, 2020, the Falcons declined the fifth-year option on McKinley's contract.

In November 2020, McKinley publicly requested to be traded after privately requesting the Falcons since 2019, who had turned down several trade offers from other teams. He was waived by the team shortly after. Later in the same month, McKinley was claimed off waivers by the Bengals and San Francisco 49ers but had his contracts for both voided due to failed physicals.

=== Las Vegas Raiders ===
McKinley was claimed off waivers by the Las Vegas Raiders on November 23, 2020. He was placed on injured reserve on November 27. He was designated to return from injured reserve on December 15, and began practicing with the team again, but head coach Jon Gruden announced on December 30 that he would not be activated.

=== Cleveland Browns ===
McKinley signed a one-year contract with the Cleveland Browns on March 17, 2021. In Week 14, McKinley had two tackles and a sack, including a forced fumble on Tyler Huntley in a 24–22 win over the Baltimore Ravens. He suffered a torn Achilles in the game and was placed on season-ending injured reserve on December 21. He finished the season with 18 tackles, 2.5 sacks and a forced fumble through 11 games.

=== Tennessee Titans ===
On September 16, 2022, McKinley signed with the practice squad of the Tennessee Titans.

=== Los Angeles Rams ===
On September 21, 2022, McKinley was signed by the Los Angeles Rams off the practice squad of the Titans. His contract was terminated by the Rams on October 18.

=== Dallas Cowboys ===
On November 16, 2022, McKinley signed with the Dallas Cowboys practice squad, reuniting with defensive coordinator Dan Quinn, who was his head coach with the Falcons.

On March 22, 2023, the Cowboys re-signed McKinley on a one-year deal. He was released on June 9.

=== New York Jets ===
On June 13, 2024, McKinley signed with the New York Jets. He was released on October 23, but signed to the practice squad on October 31. On December 13, McKinley was released by the Jets.

== NFL statistics ==
Year	Team	Games		Tackles				Interceptions						Fumbles			
Year	Team	GP	GS	Comb	Solo	Ast	Sack	Int	Yards	Avg	Lng	TD	PD	FF	FR	Yards	TD
2017	ATL	16	0	20	15	5	6	0	0	0	0	0	1	2	1	0	0
2018	ATL	15	8	22	15	7	7	0	0	0	0	0	0	0	0	0	0
2019	ATL	14	13	29	18	11	3.5	0	0	0	0	0	0	0	0	0	0
2020	ATL	4	4	8	5	3	1	0	0	0	0	0	1	0	0	0	0
2021	CLE	4	0	9	4	5	2.5	0	0	0	0	0	0	0	0	0	0
Career		53	25	88	57	31	20	0	0	0	0	0	2	2	1	0	0
