= Jermaine Terry II =

American football player (born 2003)

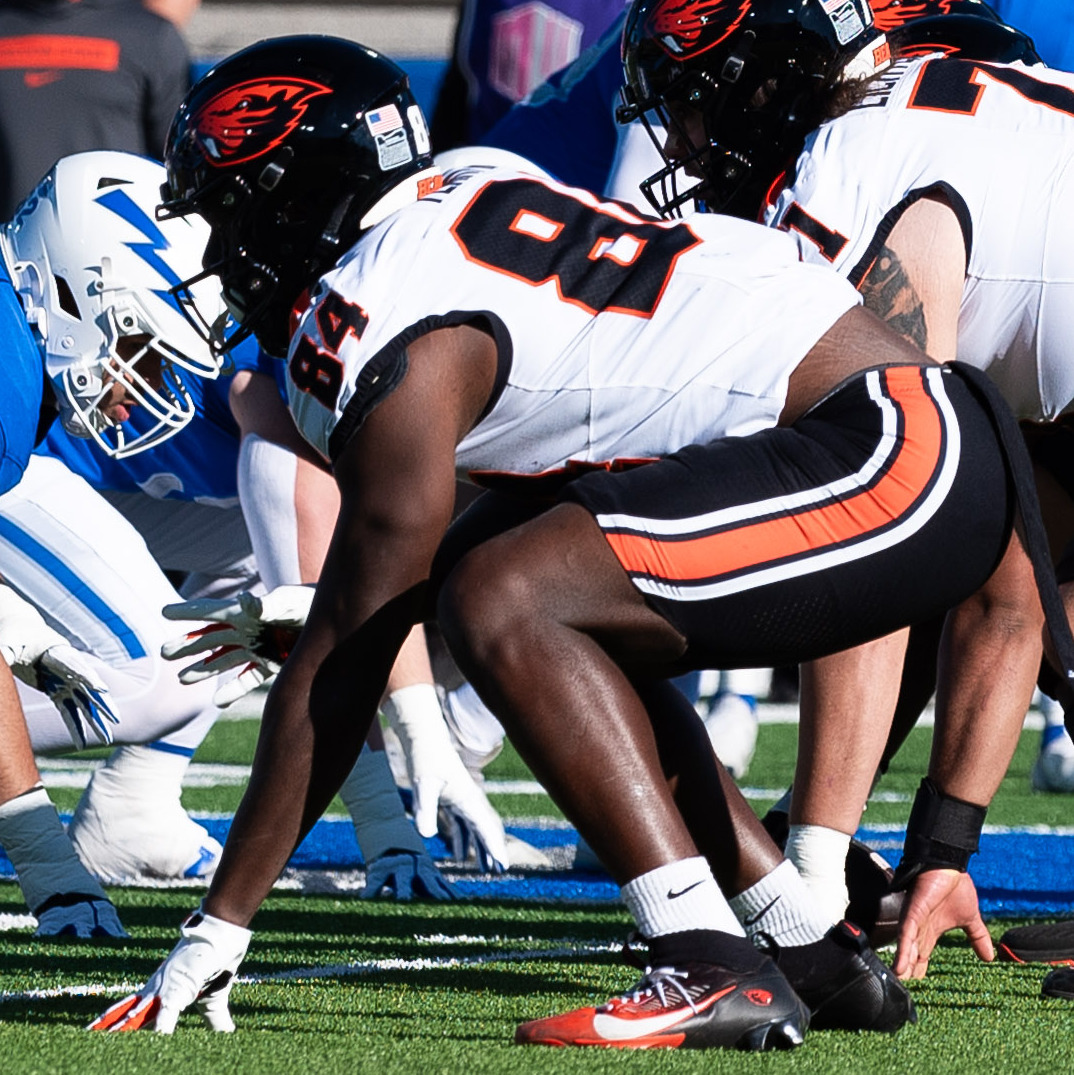
- Terry with Oregon State in 2024

Profile
- Position: Tight end

Personal information
- Born: May 6, 2003 (age 23); Richmond, California, U.S.
- Listed height: 6 ft 4 in (1.93 m)
- Listed weight: 245 lb (111 kg)

Career information
- High school: John F. Kennedy (Richmond, California)
- College: California (2021–2022); Oregon State (2023–2024)
- NFL draft: 2025: undrafted

Career history
- New York Giants (2025)*; Cleveland Browns (2026)*
- * Offseason or practice squad member only

Jermaine Terry II (born May 6, 2003) is an American football tight end. He played college football for the California Golden Bears and Oregon State Beavers.

== Early life ==
Terry II attended John F. Kennedy High School located in Richmond, California. Coming out of high school, he was rated as a four star recruit, where he committed to play college football for the California Golden Bears over other offers from schools such as Oregon and Oregon State.

== College football ==
=== California ===
During his two year career with the Golden Bears in 2021 and 2022, Terry II played in 19 games with 12 starts, totaling 8 receptions for 52 yards. After the conclusion of the 2022 season, he decided to enter his name into the NCAA transfer portal.

=== Oregon State ===
Terry II transferred to play for the Oregon State Beavers. During his first season with Oregon State in 2023, he appeared in 13 games, recording six catches for 52 yards and a touchdown. In week six of the 2024 season, Terry II hauled in three passes for 42 yards including a two-point conversion in double-overtime, to helped the Beavers to a win over Colorado State. He finished the 2024 season, hauling in 23 receptions for 375 yards and a touchdown, where after the conclusion of the season he declared for the 2025 NFL draft.

== Professional career ==
Pre-draft measurables
Height	Weight	Arm length	Hand span	Wingspan	40-yard dash	10-yard split	20-yard split	20-yard shuttle	Three-cone drill	Vertical jump	Broad jump	Bench press
6 ft 4 in (1.93 m)	241 lb (109 kg)	33 1/8 in (0.84 m)	9 3/8 in (0.24 m)	6 ft 8 5/8 in (2.05 m)	4.90 s	1.73 s	2.86 s	4.45 s	7.02 s	30.0 in (0.76 m)	9 ft 5 in (2.87 m)	17 reps
All values from Pro Day

=== New York Giants ===
After not being selected in the 2025 NFL draft, Terry II signed with the New York Giants as an undrafted free agent. He was waived on August 26 with an injury designation as part of final roster cuts.

=== Cleveland Browns ===
On August 17, 2026, Terry II signed with the Cleveland Browns. On August 28, he was waived by Cleveland.
