= John F. Kennedy High School (Richmond, California) =

Location
- 4300 Cutting Boulevard; Richmond, California 94804; United States; 37°55′29″N 122°19′42″W

Information
- Other name: Kennedy High School
- Type: Public high school
- Established: 1967
- School district: West Contra Costa Unified School District
- NCES School ID: 063255005037
- Principal: Jarod Scott
- Teaching staff: 41.81 (on an FTE basis)
- Grades: 9–12
- Enrollment: 825 (2023–2024)
- Student to teacher ratio: 19.73
- Colors: Red and white
- Mascot: Eagle
- Nickname: Eagles
- Website: kennedy.wccusd.net

John F. Kennedy High School (simply referred to as Kennedy High School) is a public high school in Richmond, California, United States. It was established in 1967 and is part of the West Contra Costa Unified School District. Built on the site of Granada Junior High, the school adopted the red and white colors and Eagle mascot from Harry Ells High School, which at that time was slated for closure.

== History ==
=== First two decades ===
John F. Kennedy High School first opened its doors in September 1967. In its early years, the school gained acclaim for its innovative academic and vocational programs and was considered one of the top schools in California. Until the 1980s, it used an experimental program known as flexible modular scheduling based on the model of colleges and universities, with the staff trained to create educational programs customized for each student. As written by Knowles Adkisson of the Berkeley School of Journalism, "The new institution was meant to be a model for California and the country. ... the school served as a unique example of a successful public school in an urban environment."

Kennedy High School was part of the Richmond Unified School District (RUSD), later renamed the West Contra Costa Unified School District. It opened during a time of national debate over desegregation through forced busing. The efforts of the RUSD to institute a desegregation program met with controversy, and a backlash against the program developed. In response, the RUSD instituted the Richmond Voluntary Integration Plan, where students were bused from a relatively large geographic area. The voluntary nature of the plan meant families could choose whether or not to participate. The program met some of its greatest success at John F. Kennedy High. Adkisson writes that the school was "more integrated, both racially and economically, than perhaps any [other] public high school in the U.S. at the time. The sons and daughters of skilled African-American tradesmen walked the halls with students whose parents worked for Bank of America in San Francisco, and oversaw academic departments at the University of California, Berkeley." That environment contributed to what became known as the Camelot era at the school, named after the term used for the administration of President John F. Kennedy.

The school became known on a national level for its forensics program. Led by coach David Dansky for twenty-five years, Kennedy teams won three state championships in forensics and various state and national individual awards, including second place by Richard Mitchel (via a tie-breaker for first) at the 1969 National Speech Tournament. Mitchel was one of the first black students in the nation to win such a trophy in the Forensics League. In 1973, the school had the largest chapter in the National Forensics League in the nation. It had the second largest chapter twice, and was among the top five schools in the country seven other years. Kennedy succeeded against some of the most elite public and private schools in California.

The history of the school's educational model remains of interest on a national level today. Adkisson writes: "Many inner-city public high schools in 2016 face particular challenges with regard to funding, segregation and increasing competition for promising students from charter schools. These trends developed over decades, and can be seen especially in the case of John F. Kennedy High School in Richmond, California." He discusses how Kennedy was considered among the best schools in California, and how it declined after several decades to rank among the worst, offering a valuable case study in the discussion of challenges and potential solutions for education reform.

=== Funding ===
From 1971 to 1977, the California Supreme Court decided the Serrano v. Priest cases, which were intended to equalize revenue for school districts in the state. Prior to Serrano, each district set property taxes to meet its needs. This forced poorer districts to raise taxes more than wealthier districts to fund their schools. The court found the structure unconstitutional and required districts to close the gap. During this time, Richmond claimed a strong manufacturing section. Although property taxes for residential areas were low, the tax income from industry was much higher. This impacted Kennedy; an unintended result of Serrano was to reduce funding at schools in urban areas with high tax assessments, though such schools were exactly the type Serrano was meant to help.

In 1978, Proposition 13 passed in California, cutting the tax rate. The year after it passed, revenue generated by property taxes dropped almost 60 percent. (Note: In 1997, the Little Hoover Commission wrote about the effects of Serrano and Proposition 13: "Property tax rates were instantly equalized...overnight, the State went from having diverse tax rates set and collected locally to essentially a single statewide system...many believe the shift from local to state control has eroded financial resources for schools, public support for the education system and meaningful accountability.") As a result of Serrano and Proposition 13, funding for Kennedy plummeted. In the following years, the school lost many programs, including the Pre-tech, Aerospace, Bio-Medical, and Electronics programs, and the free busing for the voluntary integration. Attendance dropped, and many faculty lost their jobs or chose to go elsewhere. The school discontinued flexible scheduling after the 1981–1982 school year.

Effects of the lowered funding were gradual through the 1980s. The school continued to send students to top colleges, including the ivy leagues, and athletic programs remained strong. However, the financial troubles of the district continued to deepen. In 1991, the RUSD became the first district in California to file for bankruptcy. As written in The Washington Post, "A debt-ridden school district once praised as a leader in education reform filed for bankruptcy protection today, illustrating the dilemma schools face in trying to balance high ideals with recessionary times." The loss in funds, resources, and teachers at Kennedy accelerated.

Changes in demographics also affected the school. Richmond was losing businesses and hence jobs, leaving families from previously middle-class areas in poverty. Increasing drug and gang activity spilled into the school. Adkisson writes, "The storm of dark events that enshrouded the city of Richmond and its unified school district from 1988 to 1993 is almost unbelievable, in retrospect. Economic and social epidemics struck locally, just as the school district was about to undergo its greatest crisis since the city quintupled in population during World War II....Richmond was emblematic of trends occurring in urban communities across the country, as the manufacturing sector collapsed and crack cocaine worked insidiously through the inner cities. The result would be a Kennedy High School that was unrecognizable to previous graduates and teachers."

Violence and murders in the city, along with an inconsistent economy and high unemployment, intensified the problems. Test scores dropped and crime rose. By the turn of the century, the situation had become so severe that the initials of the school, JFK, were said to stand for Jail For Kids. In 2010, Kennedy nearly closed due to budget cuts, but the city of Richmond kept it open with an allocation of $1.5 million.

=== Renewal ===
In recent years, new programs have been added, funding has increased, and faculty turnover has decreased. The school has shown improvement in test scores, attendance, safety, suspension rate, incident reports, requests for transfers, senior class size, and the number of students attending college. Julio Franco, who served as principal from 2001 to 2008, is credited with playing a major role in the turn-around. Retired teacher Mike Peritz became one of the founders of the Eagle Foundation, which through 2018 provided support to the school with scholarships to students and grants to teachers.

In 2011, the school joined 'The Mock Trial' program, which is designed to create a collegiate culture and help students develop a working knowledge of the judicial system. In 2013, with the help of Peritz and the Eagle Foundation, the school reinstated its abandoned music program. In 2014, a $100,000 grant from Sprint Corporation allowed the school to participate in 'Project Connection', which provides computers and Internet access to students without the economic means to access such technology. During the same year, the school instituted the 'WriterCoach Connection', a program built on personalized instruction that pairs teachers to work one-on-one with students, with the goal of helping them think critically and write with confidence. In 2019, grants from WCCUSD Educational Fund and the Philanthropic Ventures Foundation made possible the continued development of special education and vocational programs.

A $500,000 grant from the U.S. Department of Health and Human Services in 2015 made it possible to open a health clinic, which serves students at the school and South Richmond residents.

In 2016, Kennedy became part of the Richmond Promise initiative, which is designed to encourage and facilitate the opportunity for all Richmond students to attend college regardless of race, income level, or personal background.

It was demolished in 2025 for a modernization project and near total rebuild.

== Athletics ==
Kennedy's mascot is the Eagles. The school competes in the Tri-County Athletic League of the Bay Shore Conference in California's North Coast Section.

=== Boys' sports ===
The school fields boys' sports teams in baseball, basketball, cross country, football, soccer, and track and field.

In football, the Kennedy Eagles won the North Coast Section championship in both 1984 and 1988. The 1984 team included two players, Terry Obee and Rod Moore, who would later play in the NFL, and a total of five players who received Division One college football scholarships. For the rest of the decade and through at least 1992, Kennedy sent one or more players each year to a Division One college football program on scholarship. In 2016, the Kennedy football team achieved their first winning season since 1988.

In track and field, the Kennedy boys won both the Meet of Champions and the Bay Championships Meet in 1974.

=== Girls' sports ===
The school fields girls' sports teams in basketball, cross country, soccer, softball, track and field, and volleyball.

In 2013, the Kennedy girls sprinters team finished first in both the 3rd Annual Tiger Invite at South Pasadena High School, and the 46th Annual Arcadia Invitational at Arcadia High School, a track and field event that involved more than six hundred schools from over thirty states. Kennedy student Takkarist McKinley won first place at Arcadia in the boy's 200-meter dash.

Also in 2013, the girls basketball team advanced to its first state basketball game at the NorCal Division III playoffs.

== Demographics ==
As of the 2018–2019 school year, the school enrolled 851 students, with a student/teacher ratio of 20. Of those students, 55.8% were male and 44.2% female, and they represented the following ethnicities:

- Hispanic — 64.5%
- Black — 25.3%
- Asian — 6.2%
- White — 2.0%
- Native Hawaiian/Pacific islanders — 1.3%
- Multiracial — 0.6%
- Native American/Alaskan — 0%

88.0% of the students were eligible for free or reduced-cost lunch, and it qualified as a Title I school.

== Facilities ==
The school is the location of the renovated Richmond Swim Center, which provides facilities for the school and the community.

In 2015, the Fab Foundation chose the West Contra Costa Unified School District as the first public school district on the West Coast to develop a fab lab, or fabrication laboratory. Kennedy High School is home to the facility, known as 'Fab Lab Richmond', which includes 3D printers, laser cutters, an electronics workbench, and other stations in the school's former auto body shop. It serves both the school and the community, providing a laboratory where participants can perform personal digital fabrication and teachers can employ project-based learning techniques. The lab offers "class study trips, evening and weekend classes, technical training, and open labs, further developing the ability of Kennedy High School to function as a full service community school." Chevron Corporation provided a $1 million grant to help fund the program as part of a ten million commitment to the Fab Foundation.

== Principals ==
The following is a list of former principals:

- Richard Lovette (1967–1968)
- Harry Reynolds (1968–1971)
- Thomas (Tom) Anton (1971–1976)
- Lawrence Chapman (1976–1979)
- Patricia (Pat) Rupley (1979–1982)
- Charles Dorton (1982–1984)
- Sylvester Greenwood (1984–1988)
- Lavonya DeJean (1988–1991)
- Ted Abreau (1991–1997)
- Rosalyn Morgan Upshaw (1997–2000)
- Gwen Huntington-Lumb (2000–2001)
- Julio Franco (2001–2008)
- Latoya Williams (2008–2009)
- Roxanne Brown-Garcia (2009–2012)
- Phillip (Phil) Johnson (2012–2017)
- Felicia Phillips (2018–2020)
- Jarod Scott (2020—present)

== Notable alumni ==
- Salim Akil, movie producer, screenwriter, and film director
- Catherine Asaro, writer, singer, and physicist
- Benny Barnes, NFL player
- Jason Becker, musician, songwriter and composer
- Norton Buffalo, singer-songwriter, country and blues harmonica player, record producer, bandleader and recording artist
- Christopher Darden, lawyer, author, actor, and lecturer
- D'Marco Farr, NFL player
- Takkarist McKinley, NFL player
- Junior Moore, MLB player
- Colin Kahl, political scientist
- Terry Obee, NFL player
- Ray Obiedo, contemporary jazz guitarist
- Randy Oda, rock and roll composer, guitarist
- Jermaine Terry II, NFL player
- Judy Tyrus, ballet dancer, curator, archivist
