= Kuoth Wiel =

South-Sudanese-American model and actress

- Education: Augsburg College
- Occupation: actress

Kuoth Wiel is a South-Sudanese-American model and actress, best known for her role in The Good Lie (2014), a drama film portraying four child refugees from war-torn Sudan.

== Life ==
Wiel was born in a refugee camp in Itang, Ethiopia, the daughter of United Nations relief workers. She spent her early life moving between Nasir in South Sudan, where her father was a doctor, and Gambela in Ethiopia. Her father died when she was five. Wiel and her mother immigrated to the United States in 1998, when she was about eight years old, and settled in Faribault, Minnesota.

She was a psychology student at Augsburg College when she applied to act in The Good Lie. After graduation, she moved to Los Angeles where she currently works as a model.

== Filmography ==
- The Good Lie, 2014
