= Junior Moore =

American baseball player (born 1953)

- Third baseman / Outfielder
- Born: January 25, 1953 (age 73); Waskom, Texas, U.S.
- Batted: Right Threw: Right

MLB debut
- August 2, 1976, for the Atlanta Braves

Last MLB appearance
- September 25, 1980, for the Chicago White Sox

MLB statistics
- Batting average: .264
- Home runs: 7
- Runs batted in: 73
- Stats at Baseball Reference

Teams
- Atlanta Braves (1976–1977); Chicago White Sox (1978–1980)

Alvin Earl "Junior" Moore (born January 25, 1953) is an American former professional baseball player. He was a third baseman and outfielder who appeared in 289 games in the Major Leagues for the Atlanta Braves (1976–1977) and Chicago White Sox (1978–1980). Moore batted and threw right-handed, stood 5 feet 11 inches (1.80 m) tall and weighed 185 pounds (84 kg).

== Career ==
Moore was drafted by the Braves in the eleventh round (257th overall) of the 1971 Major League Baseball draft after graduating from John F. Kennedy High School of Richmond, California. He was nearing the end of his sixth season in minor league baseball when he was recalled from the Triple-A Richmond Braves and made his Major League debut on August 2, 1976, starting at third base against the San Diego Padres. Moore then spent the entire 1977 campaign with Atlanta, appearing in an MLB-career-high 112 games (and starting 92 games at third base). But he was released at the end of the season, and signed as a free agent by the White Sox. Moore then split 1978 between the ChiSox and the Triple-A Iowa Oaks before logging another full campaign, 1979, in the Majors. Playing mostly as an outfielder, he appeared in 88 games, with 42 starts in the field. In his final big league season in 1980, Moore again bounced between the White Sox and their Triple-A affiliate.

In his 289 big-league games, Moore collected 204 hits in 774 at bats, with 20 doubles and seven triples accompanying his seven home runs. He spent the final five seasons of his professional career in the Mexican League, retiring in 1985.
