= The History of Sketch Comedy =

Podcast by Keegan-Michael and Elle Key

The History of Sketch Comedy is an Audible Plus podcast by Keegan-Michael Key and Elle Key.

== Background ==
The trailer for the show was released on January 5, 2021. The series was released on January 28, 2021. The idea for the show came from Key's wife, Elle Key. The series is also directed and co-written by Elle Key. The series consists of 10 episodes that are each roughly 30 minutes long. The podcast is an Audible Plus show and is exclusive to the platform. The podcast was not performed in front of live audience, but Key did record with Elle Key, a sound engineer, and a production assistant. Laura Jane Standley and Eric McQuade wrote in The Atlantic that "Key's knowledge of comedy is sophisticated" and included the show in their list of the best podcasts in 2021. The show was nominated for a 2022 NAACP Image Award. The show won the 2022 People's Voice Award for Best Writing at the Webby Awards.
