= Margaret Nagle =

American film producer

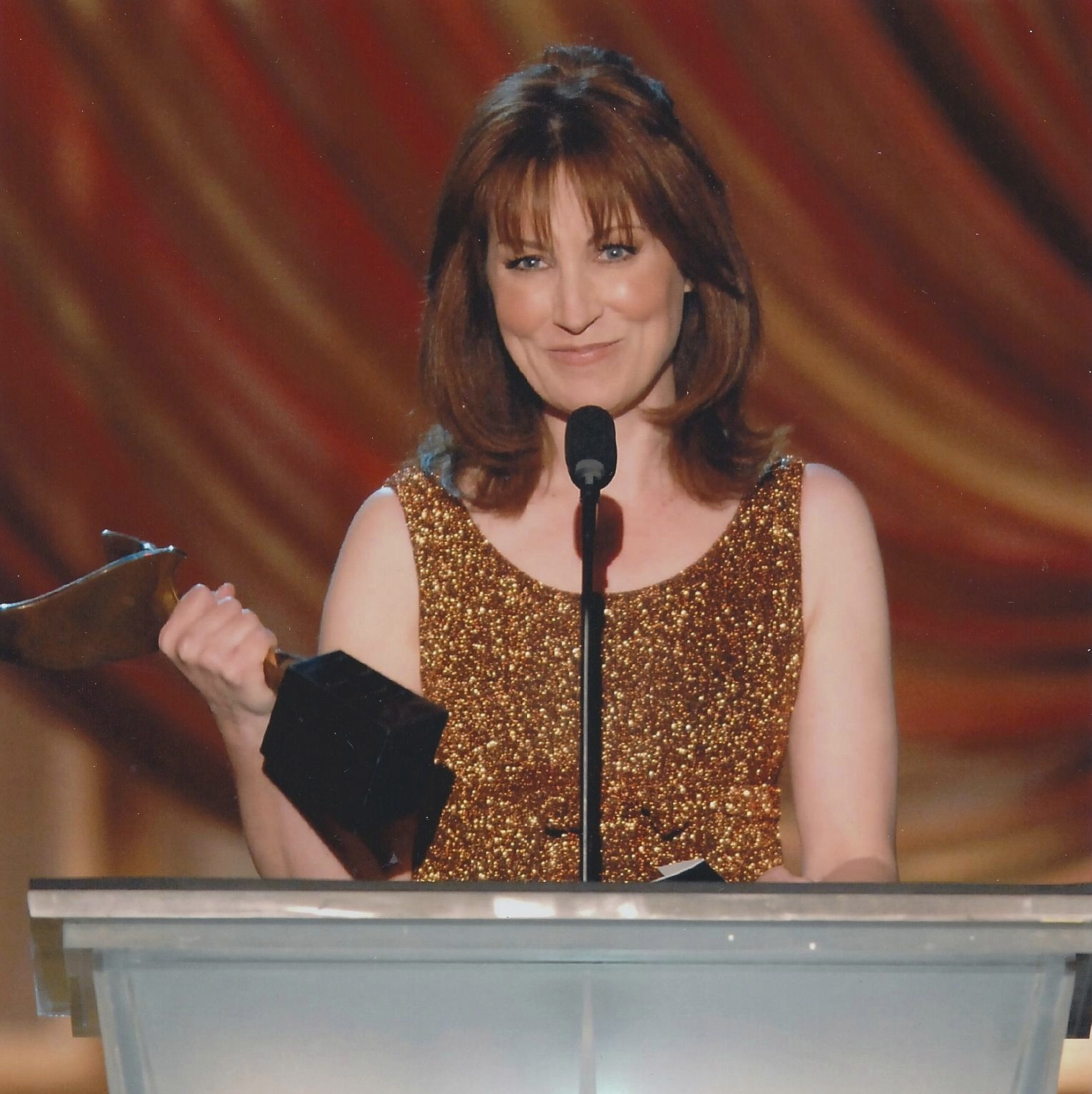
- WGA Award Winner, Emmy Award
- Occupations: screenwriter, television producer, activist, actress
- Writing career
- Years active: 2004
- Notable awards: Writers Guild of America Award

Margaret Nagle is a screenwriter, producer, and activist. She has been nominated for three Emmy Awards and won three Writers Guild of America Awards.

Her first script, HBO's Warm Springs, received sixteen Emmy nominations and won five Emmys in 2005, including the Emmy Award for Best Television Movie. It also won the 2006 Writers Guild of America Award for Long Form Original Screenplay. Her screenplay for the 2014 film "The Good Lie" received The Paul Selvin Award from the Writers Guild of America. Nagle also received a 2011 Writer's Guild Award for her work on Boardwalk Empire. Nagle has been nominated for three Humanitas Awards, an NAACP Award, and the Pen Award.

She received the 2014 Media Access Award from the Writers Guild of America for "doubling the number" of people on network TV with disabilities. Nagle has been raising money for Humanitarian Aid for South Sudan by appearing at screenings of The Good Lie on behalf of Concern, UNICEF, RefugePoint and other organizations.

== Career ==
Nagle wrote the script for The Good Lie, released in 2014, a movie about the Lost Boys of Sudan, It premiered at 2014 Toronto Film Festival, where it received the longest standing ovation in the history of the festival. It was released in 2014 by Warner Brothers.

Nagle received the 2015 Paul Selvin Award from the Writers Guild of America for The Good Lie. The award is given each year to the WGA member whose script best embodies the spirit of the constitutional and civil rights and liberties that are indispensable to the survival of free writers everywhere and to which Selvin devoted his professional life. Nagle was nominated for Best Original Screenplay of a Feature Film for The Good Lie at the 2015 NAACP AWARDS. Through Thegoodliefund.org, the movie has been raising money for humanitarian aid for South Sudan. The film is shown on college campuses through The Enough Project.

Nagle received the 2015 Jonathan Daniels Award from the Monadnock International Film Festival celebrating the fusion of artistic merit and social awareness.

A former actress, Nagle appeared in My So-Called Life as beleaguered biology teacher Ms. Chavatal. Bruce Weber in his New York Times review of the show wrote, "Watch out for the faculty members, each astutely idiosyncratic. I especially liked the hopelessly perky science teacher, played by Margaret Nagle, whose style is to lead the class to answers they have no interest in giving: "An experiment must test a what? A hypothesis. And a hypothesis consists of several . . . ? Anybody?"

Nagle's first film script, Warm Springs, about FDR's struggles with polio, won the Emmy for Best Movie in 2006. It was also nominated for Best Television Movie by the Golden Globes. Nagle won the 2007 WGA Award for Best Screenplay of a Movie Made for Television for Warm Springs and was nominated for the Pen Award for Best Screenplay of a Television Movie, as well as the 2007 Humanitas Prize.

Nagle wrote two episodes for season one of HBO's Boardwalk Empire: "Broadway Limited" and "Anastasia". She was a supervising producer on season one and season two of the show. Season one of Boardwalk Empire won Best TV Series at the Golden Globes in 2010. Her other work includes the Lifetime show Side Order of Life in 2007, for which she won a special award from The Academy of Television Arts and Sciences.

Nagle wrote the 2014 pilot for American television of Red Band Society for Fox with Amblin TV based on the Catalan TV series of the same name (Polseres vermelles).

== Personal ==
Nagle is named after her great-aunt, modern dance pioneer Margaret Newell H'Doubler. Nagle, who has a brother with a brain injury from a car accident, is involved in furthering rights and visibility for people with disabilities and is on the board of United Cerebral Palsy of Southern California. Nagle received the Media Access Award from the Writers Guild of America for through her work "doubling the number" of people on network TV with disabilities.

== Awards ==
- 2015 Writers Guild of America Paul Selvin Award for The Good Lie.
- 2015 Jonathan Daniels Award from the Monadnock International Film Festival for The Good Lie.
- 2014 Writers Guild of America Evan Somers Media Access Award for body of work.
- Writers Guild of America Award for Best New Show 2011 for Boardwalk Empire.
- Television Academy Honors 2007 award for One hour Series writing/producing for "Side Order of Life" with Dick Wolf for "Law and Order" and David Kelley for "Boston Legal."
- Won the Writers Guild Award for Best Original Television Movie 2006 for Warm Springs.
