= Will Berson =

American screenwriter

Will Berson is an American screenwriter living in Los Angeles, California. He wrote the screenplay and story of Judas and the Black Messiah with Shaka King, which was nominated for an Academy Award for Best Original Screenplay in 2021.

== Early life ==
Berson grew up in Harlem, New York City, in the same apartment his father did. His mother was a high school librarian, writer, and activist and his father was a psychologist and a minister at The Ethical Culture Society. Berson attended The Bronx High School of Science and earned a BA from Haverford College, majoring in Art History at Bryn Mawr. He was an actor in the Haverford/Bryn Mawr improv and sketch comedy group, The Lighted Fools.

== Career ==
After college, he returned to New York and worked as a writers' assistant on Spin City and Welcome to New York while studying and performing at the Upright Citizens Brigade Theater (UCB). In 2001, he moved to Los Angeles, where he worked as a writers' assistant on Scrubs, writing the season two episode, "My Drama Queen." He also wrote on the WB's Run of the House, and Nickelodeon's The Mighty B! created by and starring Amy Poehler. He performed and taught at Upright Citizens Brigade, New York and Los Angeles.

He transitioned into drama during the mid-aughts, based on his love of The Sopranos, Deadwood and The Wire. In 2010, he developed a pilot with David Milch about the founding and coeducation of the Johns Hopkins Medical School in 1893. In 2014, he sold a pilot to Spike TV with Edward James Olmos attached to star and produce. The story was based on King Lear, set inside a Big Pharma company. In 2017, he helped adapt and produce the Amazon pilot Sea Oak, based on the George Saunders short story. He co-wrote and co-produced Judas and the Black Messiah, released by Warner Bros. in 2021.

== Awards and mentions ==
Berson was nominated for several best original screenplay awards for Judas and the Black Messiah, including by the Academy of Motion Picture Arts and Sciences, Writers Guild of America, and Black Reel Awards. He was also mentioned in Variety's 10 Screenwriters to Watch.

The screenplay won the NAACP Image Award for Outstanding Writing in a Motion Picture and the Writers Guild Paul Selvin Award.

In 2014, Berson was nominated for a Writers Guild Access Project Award for Elsinor, a drama pilot set up as a prequel to Hamlet.
