= Judas and the Black Messiah =

2021 film by Shaka King

- Theatrical release poster
- Directed by: Shaka King
- Screenplay by: Will Berson; Shaka King
- Story by: Will Berson; Shaka King; Kenny Lucas; Keith Lucas
- Produced by: Charles D. King; Ryan Coogler; Shaka King
- Starring: Daniel Kaluuya; LaKeith Stanfield; Jesse Plemons; Dominique Fishback; Ashton Sanders; Martin Sheen
- Cinematography: Sean Bobbitt
- Edited by: Kristan Sprague
- Music by: Mark Isham; Craig Harris
- Production companies: MACRO; Participant; Bron Creative; Proximity Media
- Distributed by: Warner Bros. Pictures
- Release dates: February 1, 2021 (Sundance); February 12, 2021 (United States)
- Running time: 126 minutes
- Countries: United States; Canada
- Language: English
- Budget: $26 million
- Box office: $7.5 million

Judas and the Black Messiah is a 2021 biographical historical crime drama film directed and produced by Shaka King, who wrote the screenplay with Will Berson, based on a story by the pair and Kenny and Keith Lucas. The film is about the betrayal of Fred Hampton (played by Daniel Kaluuya), chairman of the Illinois chapter of the Black Panther Party in late 1960s Chicago, by William O'Neal (played by LaKeith Stanfield), an FBI informant. Jesse Plemons, Dominique Fishback, Ashton Sanders, Darrell Britt-Gibson, Lil Rel Howery, Algee Smith, Dominique Thorne, and Martin Sheen also star.

A Fred Hampton biopic had been in the works for several years, with the Lucas brothers and Will Berson writing and shopping screenplays individually since 2014. Berson's version almost got made with F. Gary Gray directing, but King was hired to direct when that fell through. The cast joined in 2019, with the blessings of Hampton's family, with filming beginning that fall in Ohio.

Judas and the Black Messiah premiered at the 2021 Sundance Film Festival on February 1, 2021, and was released in the United States by Warner Bros. Pictures on February 12, simultaneously in theaters and digitally on HBO Max. Released amid the COVID-19 pandemic, the film grossed $7 million worldwide against a budget of $26 million. The film was acclaimed by critics, who praised King's direction, the cinematography, the screenplay, the performances (particularly Kaluuya, Stanfield, and Fishback), and its timely themes. The film earned six Oscar nominations at the 93rd Academy Awards, including Best Picture and Best Supporting Actor for Stanfield, winning Best Supporting Actor (Kaluuya) and Best Original Song ("Fight for You"). For his performance, Kaluuya also won Best Supporting Actor at the Golden Globes, Critics' Choice Awards, Screen Actors Guild Awards, and BAFTA Awards. Since its release, Judas and the Black Messiah has been cited as one of the best films of the 2020s.

== Plot ==
In 1968, 19-year-old petty criminal William O'Neal is arrested in Chicago after attempting to steal a car by posing as a federal officer. He is approached by FBI Special Agent Roy Mitchell, who offers to have O'Neal's charges dropped if he works undercover for the Bureau. O'Neal is assigned to infiltrate the Illinois chapter of the Black Panther Party (BPP) and obtain information on its leader, Fred Hampton.

O'Neal begins to grow close to Hampton, who works to form alliances with rival gangs and militia bands while extending community outreach through the BPP's Free Breakfast for Children Program. Hampton's persuasive oratory eventually helps to form the multiracial Rainbow Coalition along with the Young Lords and Young Patriots Organization. Hampton also falls in love with Deborah Johnson, a fellow BPP member. O'Neal begins to relay intelligence to Mitchell, who in return pays him.

After Hampton is imprisoned for allegedly stealing $71 worth of ice cream bars, O'Neal begins to rise through the ranks and is promoted to security captain. When a shootout between the Chicago Police and the BPP occurs at the chapter office, O'Neal sneaks out as the police firebomb the office. Outraged that he could have been killed, O'Neal attempts to quit being an informant, but Mitchell refuses, threatening him with the original charges.

Three months later, Hampton is released from prison while appealing his charges and reunites with Deborah, now pregnant with his child. BPP member Jimmy Palmer, who was hospitalized with non-life-threatening injuries after being shot by a police officer, dies unexpectedly while being transferred to another hospital. Assuming police have murdered Jimmy, fellow member Jake Winters engages in a shootout with police, killing several officers before being gunned down himself.

After Hampton's appeal is rejected, FBI Director J. Edgar Hoover orders that he be "neutralized" rather than allowing him to return to prison. Mitchell coerces O'Neal into helping with the plan by warning him that the BPP will turn on him if they find out he's an informant, and O'Neal reluctantly agrees to help. O'Neal is later handed a vial of sedatives and ordered to drug Hampton's drink with it by another undercover FBI collaborator, who hands O'Neal his old fake FBI badge to prove his credentials. The following evening, BPP members gather at Hampton's apartment before he must depart for prison. An allied gang leader offers Hampton money to flee the country, but he turns it down and instead orders that a clinic be established with the money in Jake's memory. During the evening, O'Neal reluctantly drugs Hampton's drink and departs soon after. Hours later, officers and agents raid the apartment and assassinate Hampton after shooting or injuring the other Black Panthers, while Deborah is arrested. Later, O'Neal meets with Mitchell, who gives him money and a pair of keys to a gas station which is being given to him. O'Neal attempts to quit again but reluctantly accepts the money and keys and puts them in his pocket.

Archive footage is shown of Hampton's speeches, including his funeral procession, and an interview O'Neal gave in 1989. The title cards state that O'Neal continued to work as an informant within the BPP before taking his own life in 1990. A lawsuit was filed against the FBI in 1970 and 12 years later was settled for $1.85 million. As of the film's release, Fred Hampton Jr. and his mother serve as chairman and board member of the Black Panther Party Cubs.

== Cast ==
- Daniel Kaluuya as Fred Hampton, chairman of the Black Panther chapter in Chicago
- LaKeith Stanfield as Bill O'Neal, an FBI informant who infiltrates the Black Panther Party
- Jesse Plemons as Roy Mitchell, O'Neal's FBI Special Agent handler
- Dominique Fishback as Deborah Johnson, Hampton's girlfriend and a Black Panther member
- Ashton Sanders as Jimmy Palmer, a Black Panther member
- Algee Smith as Jake Winters, a Black Panther member
- Darrell Britt-Gibson as Bobby Rush, co-founder of the Black Panther Party chapter in Chicago
- Lil Rel Howery as Wayne, an undercover FBI agent
- Dominique Thorne as Judy Harmon, a Black Panther member
- Martin Sheen as J. Edgar Hoover, Director of the FBI
- Mark Francis as FBI Agent David Black
- Amari Cheatom as Rod Collins, leader of the Crowns, a fictionalized version of a Chicago gang
- Khris Davis as Steel, a Crowns leader
- Ian Duff as Doc Satchel
- Caleb Eberhardt as Bob Lee
- Robert Longstreet as Leslie Carlyle, Mitchell's FBI colleague
- Amber Chardae Robinson as Betty Coachman
- Jermaine Fowler as Mark Clark, a member of The Black Panther Party.

In addition, Nicholas Velez portrays José Cha Cha Jiménez, founder of the Young Lords group, while Terayle Hill plays Black Panthers chairman George Sams, who is depicted as an FBI informant.

== Production ==
=== Development ===
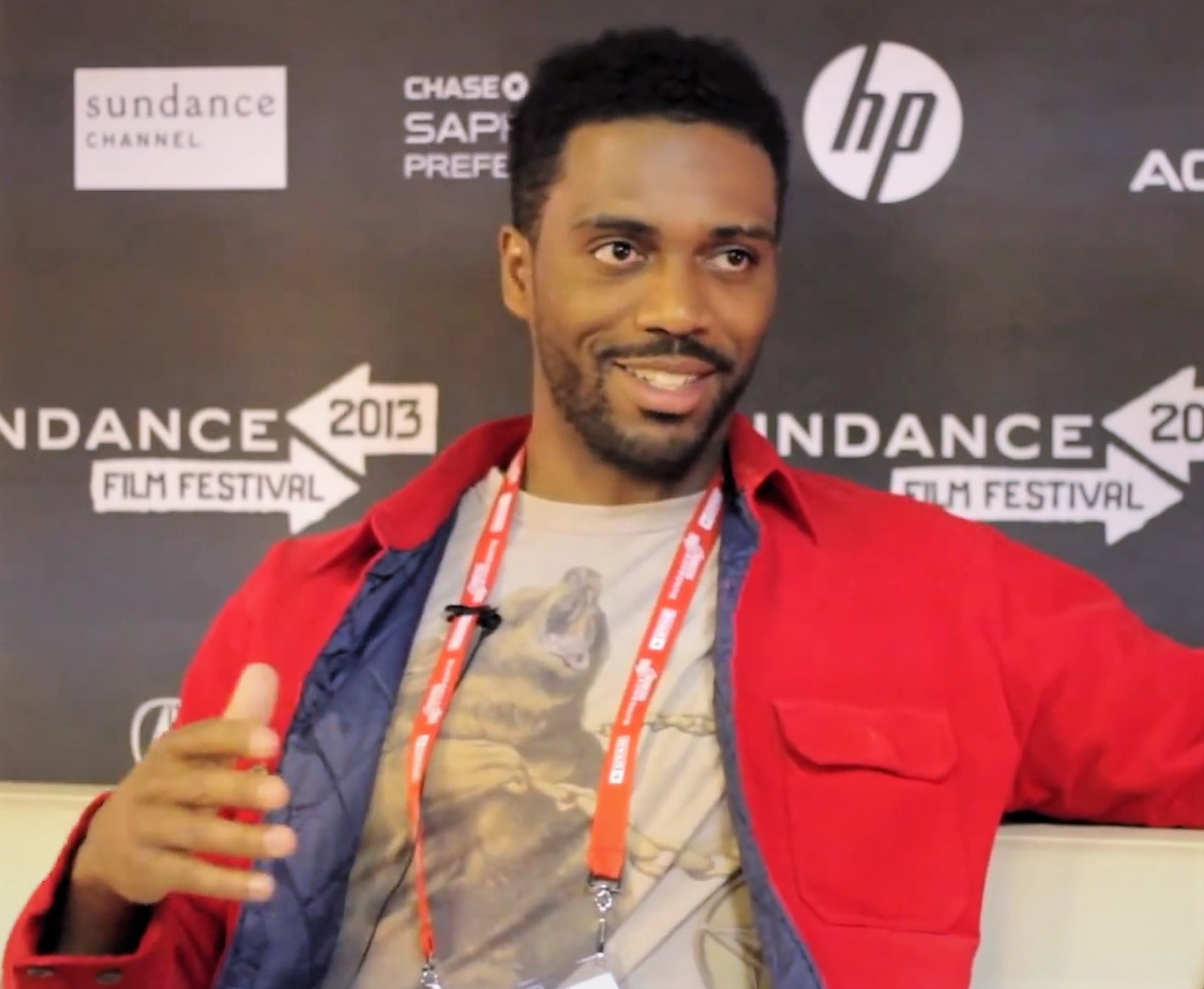
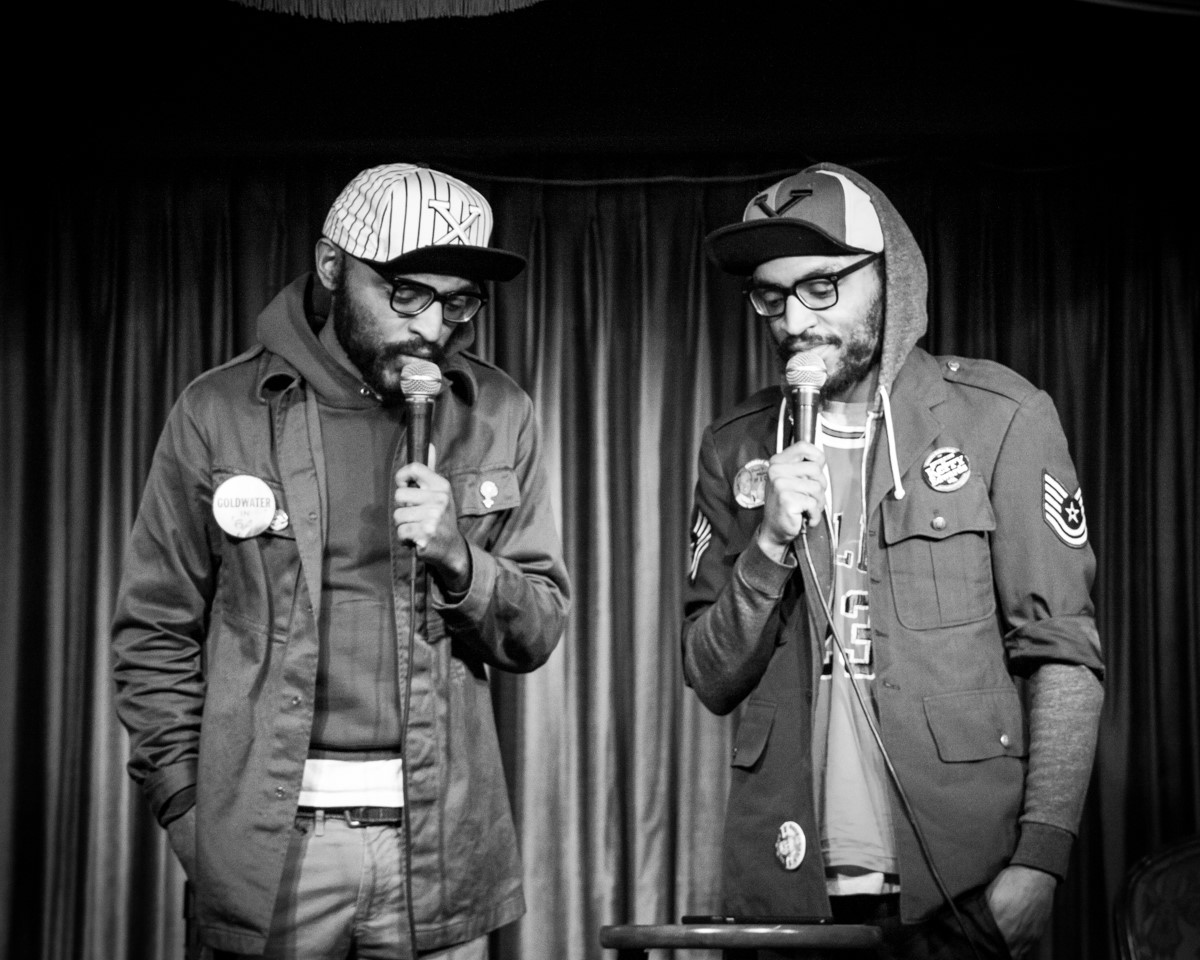
Director Shaka King (left) and co-writers Kenny and Keith Lucas

Kenny and Keith Lucas began pitching the idea of a Fred Hampton biopic to A24 and Netflix in 2014, selling it as "The Conformist meets The Departed." While working with Shaka King on a television pilot in 2016, they pitched their idea for a Hampton film, and he became intrigued. Will Berson had also written a Hampton screenplay about the same time and it was in early stages of production, with F. Gary Gray in talks to direct, Casey Affleck and John Powers Middleton in negotiations to produce, and Jaden Smith and O'Shea Jackson Jr. being eyed to portray Hampton. After that version fell through, Berson and King rewrote his script with help from the Lucas brothers.

The brothers got in touch with Macro's Charles King, who agreed to finance half of the project.

By going to market with a great script, two amazing actors and Shaka, a visionary filmmaker, and the clout that Ryan Coogler brought, plus Macro bringing half of the financing to the table with a great production plan. That put us in a position to be partners, so this movie is not purely driven by the studio. That also helped us support Shaka's vision and how he cast the movie and to keep it as authentic as possible.

— Charles D. King

=== Casting ===
In February 2019, it was announced Daniel Kaluuya and LaKeith Stanfield had joined the cast of the film, with Ryan Coogler producing and Warner Bros. Pictures distributing. The film marks the second collaboration between Kaluuya and Stanfield, following the 2017 film Get Out. King, Kaluuya, and producer Charles D. King (who provided half the film's $26 million budget) reached out to Hampton's widow Akua Njeri and her son, Fred Hampton Jr., to get their blessing on the film and casting. In September 2019, Jesse Plemons, Dominique Fishback and Ashton Sanders joined the cast of the film, with Algee Smith being cast the following month.

=== Filming and post-production ===
Principal photography began in Cleveland, Ohio on October 21, 2019. On November 25 and 26, 2019, filming took place at the Ohio State Reformatory in Mansfield. After 42 days, production concluded on December 19, 2019. Originally announced as Jesus Was My Homeboy, the film was later reported as being titled Judas and the Black Messiah before being described as untitled. Kristan Sprague began editing the film in January 2020, prior to dozens of studios being shut down due to the COVID-19 pandemic in New York, which later resulted in crew members working remotely during post-production. In July 2020, the film's title was confirmed to be Judas and the Black Messiah.

=== Music ===
Two soundtrack albums were released for the film. The first, titled Judas and the Black Messiah (Original Motion Picture Soundtrack), featured incerpts from the film's score composed by Mark Isham and Craig Harris. It was released on February 12, 2021 by WaterTower Music. The same day, another soundtrack consisting of incorporated songs was released under the title Judas and the Black Messiah: The Inspired Album. The 22-track music album featured songs from many prominent rappers, such as Jay-Z, ASAP Rocky and Nas, as well as a posthumous appearance by Nipsey Hussle. It features an original song titled "Fight for You" performed by H.E.R., who also co-wrote it with D'Mile and Tiara Thomas. The music album received critical acclaim and was featured in the 12th position of the Weekly Billboard 200 charts, while also topping the Billboard soundtracks chart, and also listed in 23rd position in the year-ender charts.

== Release ==
Judas and the Black Messiah had its world premiere at the 2021 Sundance Film Festival on February 1, 2021, at both virtual and in-person screenings. The film was released on February 12, 2021, in the United States, by Warner Bros. Pictures. The film was originally scheduled to be released on August 21, 2020, but because of the COVID-19 pandemic, it was postponed to 2021.

As part of its plans for all of its 2021 films, Warner Bros. Pictures also streamed the film simultaneously on the HBO Max service for a period of one month, after which the film played exclusively in theatres until the start of the normal home media release schedule period. Samba TV reported that 653,000 households streamed the film over its opening weekend. By the end of its first month, the film had been watched in over 1.4 million U.S. households. The film was re-added to HBO Max on July 1, 2021.

== Reception ==
=== Box office ===
Judas and the Black Messiah grossed $5.5 million in the United States and Canada, and $2 million in other territories, for a worldwide total of $7.5 million.

Compared to Land with limited expansion of Willy's Wonderland and The Mauritanian, Judas and the Black Messiah made $2.5 million from 1,888 theaters over its four-day opening weekend, finishing second at the box office behind holdover The Croods: A New Age. About 61% of the audience was African-American and 21% Caucasian, while male/female split evenly and 75% were above the age of 25. In its second weekend the film finished third, dropping 55% to $905,000, then made $500,000 in its third weekend. The weekend following its six Oscar nominations, the film made $250,000 from 951 theaters, for a domestic running total of $5 million.

=== Critical response ===
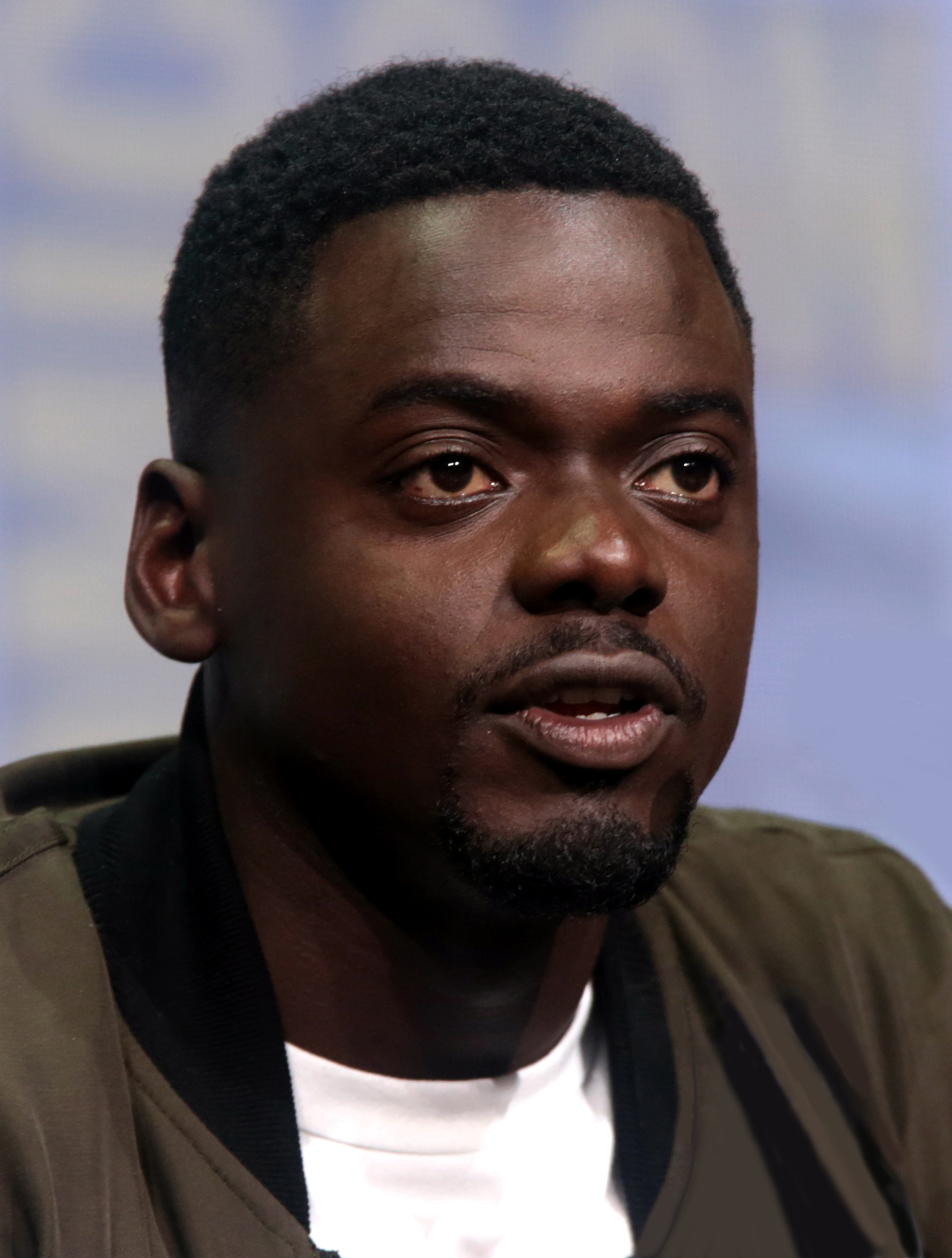
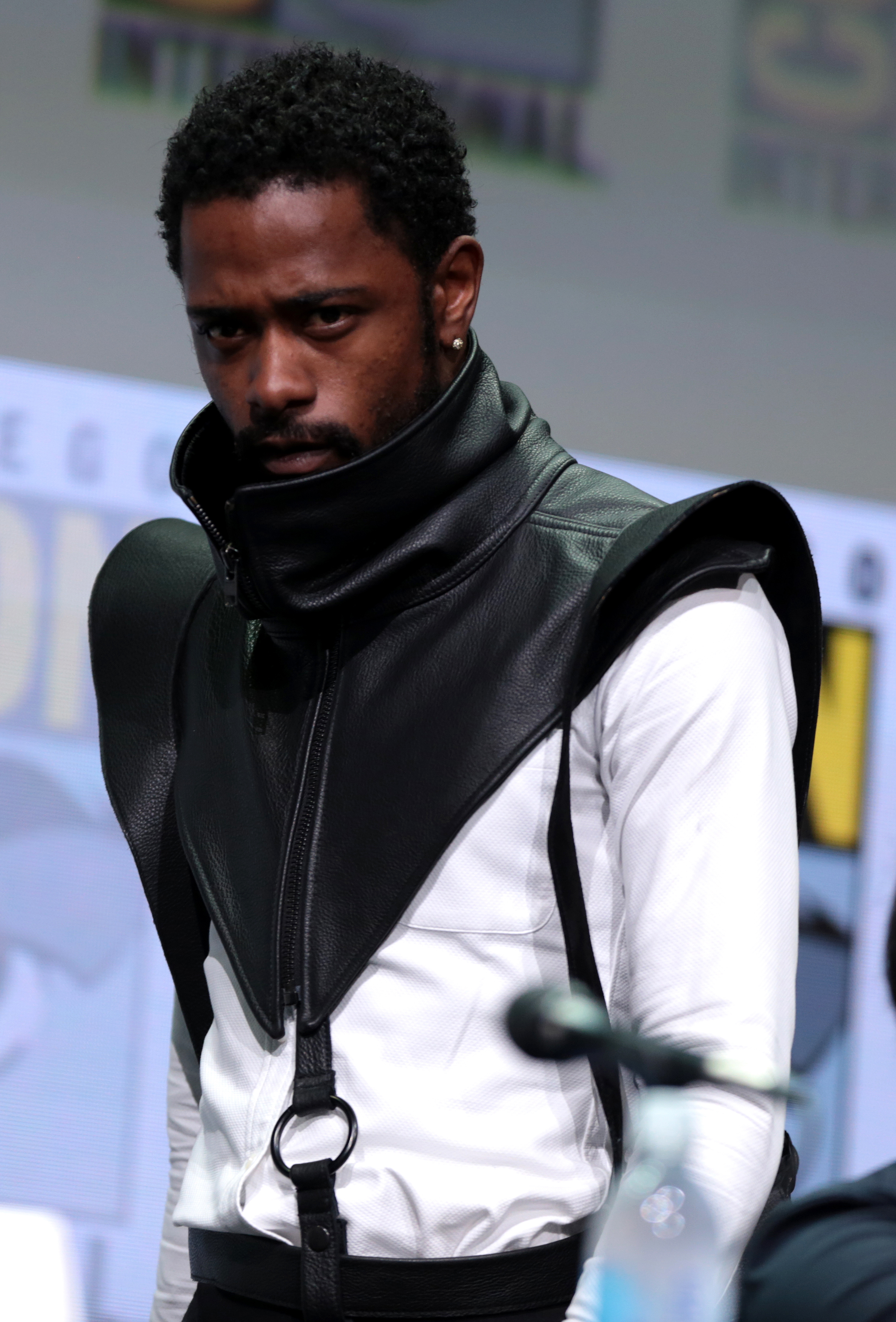
The performances of Daniel Kaluuya and LaKeith Stanfield garnered critical acclaim and both received Academy Award nominations for Best Supporting Actor, with Kaluuya winning.

Review aggregator Rotten Tomatoes reports that 96% of 358 critic reviews were positive, with an average rating of 8.2/10. The website's critics consensus reads: "An electrifying dramatization of historical events, Judas and the Black Messiah is a forceful condemnation of racial injustice – and a major triumph for its director and stars." According to Metacritic, which assigned a weighted average score of 84 out of 100 based on 49 critics, the film received "universal acclaim". Audiences polled by CinemaScore gave the film an average grade of "A" on an A+ to F scale, while 87% of filmgoers at PostTrak gave it a positive score (with an average 4.5 out of 5 stars) and 74% saying they would definitely recommend it.

Writing for Variety, Peter Debruge praised Stanfield's performance and said, "The powerful film puts the current moment into fresh historical context and suggests that ambivalence can be its own form of betrayal." David Rooney of The Hollywood Reporter wrote: "Led by sensational performances from Daniel Kaluuya as Hampton and LaKeith Stanfield as William O'Neal, the FBI informant who infiltrated his inner circle, this is a scalding account of oppression and revolution, coercion and betrayal, rendered more shocking by the undiminished currency of its themes."

Pete Hammond from Deadline Hollywood and Karen Han from Slate both compared various themes in the film to those found in The Trial of the Chicago 7 (released the year before), with Hammond saying that "King skillfully lays out each side of the equation in this raw and exciting account set in 1968". Michael Phillips of the Chicago Tribune gave the film 3.5 out of 4 stars and called the film "a leap and a bound ahead of the recent Netflix production Trial of the Chicago 7" and called it "brash, narratively risky, full of life and sneaky wit (even if the dominant tone is one of foreboding) and brimming with terrific actors."

In 2023, it ranked number 14 on Collider's list of "The 20 Best Drama Movies of the 2020s So Far," saying that "Director Shaka King was able to encapsulate Hampton's accomplishments by creating an engaging crime thriller with no ambiguities about its relevance. Within each scene of the FBI hunting down Hampton and initiating his assassination, it's evident why the conversations about black identity he initiated are still so important."

Former Black Panther Party member Eddie Conway found the portrayal of Hampton in the film inaccurate, noting that he was an outwardly warmhearted person, and not a cold, hardened individual as the film depicts. Other leftists criticized the film for neglecting to shed much light on Hampton's politics. Adrienne Weller wrote: "Centering on the betrayer is a worn out trope in films dealing with martyred challengers to the capitalist system."

=== Accolades ===
Despite being campaigned for leading actor nominations, both LaKeith Stanfield and Daniel Kaluuya were nominated for the Academy Award for Best Supporting Actor. Both of the film's primary actors appearing in the supporting category proved unexpected and confusing to the public and awards pundits. Kyle Buchanan of the New York Times jokingly questioned, "If Stanfield and Kaluuya are both supporting actors, then who exactly is this movie supposed to be about?"

Award	Date	Category	Recipients	Result	Ref.
Academy Awards	April 25, 2021	Best Picture	Shaka King, Charles D. King and Ryan Coogler	Nominated	
Academy Awards	April 25, 2021	Best Supporting Actor	Daniel Kaluuya	Won	
Academy Awards	April 25, 2021	Best Supporting Actor	LaKeith Stanfield	Nominated	
Academy Awards	April 25, 2021	Best Original Screenplay	Will Berson, Shaka King, Kenny Lucas and Keith Lucas	Nominated	
Academy Awards	April 25, 2021	Best Cinematography	Sean Bobbitt	Nominated	
Academy Awards	April 25, 2021	Best Original Song	"Fight for You" (H.E.R., Dernst Emile II and Tiara Thomas)	Won	
African-American Film Critics Association Awards	April 7, 2021	Best Picture	Judas and the Black Messiah	Won	
African-American Film Critics Association Awards	April 7, 2021	Best Supporting Actor	Daniel Kaluuya	Won	
African-American Film Critics Association Awards	April 7, 2021	Best Supporting Actress	Dominique Fishback	Won	
African-American Film Critics Association Awards	April 7, 2021	Breakout Director	Shaka King	Won	
American Film Institute Awards	January 25, 2021	Top 10 Films	Judas and the Black Messiah	Won	
Austin Film Critics Association Awards	March 19, 2021	Best Supporting Actor	Daniel Kaluuya	Won	
BET Awards	June 27, 2021	Best Movie	Judas and the Black Messiah	Won	
BET Awards	June 27, 2021	Best Actor	Daniel Kaluuya	Nominated	
BET Awards	June 27, 2021	Best Actor	LaKeith Stanfield	Nominated	
Black Reel Awards	April 11, 2021	Outstanding Motion Picture	Charles D. King, Ryan Coogler and Shaka King	Won	
Black Reel Awards	April 11, 2021	Outstanding Director	Shaka King	Nominated	
Black Reel Awards	April 11, 2021	Outstanding Actor	LaKeith Stanfield	Nominated	
Black Reel Awards	April 11, 2021	Outstanding Supporting Actor	Daniel Kaluuya	Won	
Black Reel Awards	April 11, 2021	Outstanding Supporting Actress	Dominique Fishback	Won	
Black Reel Awards	April 11, 2021	Outstanding Screenplay	Will Berson and Shaka King	Nominated	
Black Reel Awards	April 11, 2021	Outstanding Ensemble	Alexa L. Fogel	Nominated	
Black Reel Awards	April 11, 2021	Outstanding Breakthrough Performance, Female	Dominique Fishback	Nominated	
Black Reel Awards	April 11, 2021	Outstanding Emerging Director	Shaka King	Nominated	
Black Reel Awards	April 11, 2021	Outstanding Original Song	"Fight for You" (D'Mile, H.E.R. and Tiara Thomas)	Nominated	
Black Reel Awards	April 11, 2021	Outstanding Cinematography	Sean Bobbitt	Nominated	
Black Reel Awards	April 11, 2021	Outstanding Production Design	Sam Lisenco	Nominated	
British Academy Film Awards	April 11, 2021	Best Actor in a Supporting Role	Daniel Kaluuya	Won	
British Academy Film Awards	April 11, 2021	Best Actress in a Supporting Role	Dominique Fishback	Nominated	
British Academy Film Awards	April 11, 2021	Best Cinematography	Sean Bobbitt	Nominated	
British Academy Film Awards	April 11, 2021	Best Casting	Alexa L. Fogel	Nominated	
Casting Society of America	April 15, 2021	Feature Big Budget – Drama	Alexa L. Fogel, Donna Belajac, Elizabeth Berra and Missy Finnell	Nominated	
Costume Designers Guild Awards	April 13, 2021	Excellence in Period Film	Charlese Antoinette Jones	Nominated	
Critics' Choice Movie Awards	March 7, 2021	Best Supporting Actor	Daniel Kaluuya	Won	
Critics' Choice Movie Awards	March 7, 2021	Best Acting Ensemble	Judas and the Black Messiah	Nominated	
Critics' Choice Movie Awards	March 7, 2021	Best Song	"Fight for You" (D'Mile, H.E.R. and Tiara Thomas)	Nominated	
Dallas–Fort Worth Film Critics Association Awards	February 10, 2021	Best Supporting Actor	Daniel Kaluuya	Won	
Detroit Film Critics Society Awards	March 8, 2021	Best Supporting Actor	Daniel Kaluuya	Won	
Detroit Film Critics Society Awards	March 8, 2021	Best Original Screenplay	Will Berson and Shaka King	Nominated	
Dorian Awards	April 18, 2021	Best Film Performance – Supporting Actor	Daniel Kaluuya	Won	
Georgia Film Critics Association Awards	March 12, 2021	Best Supporting Actor	Daniel Kaluuya	Nominated	
Golden Globe Awards	February 28, 2021	Best Supporting Actor – Motion Picture	Daniel Kaluuya	Won	
Golden Globe Awards	February 28, 2021	Best Original Song	"Fight for You" (D'Mile, H.E.R. and Tiara Thomas)	Nominated	
Grammy Awards	April 3, 2022	Song of the Year	"Fight for You" (D'Mile, H.E.R. and Tiara Thomas)	Nominated	
Grammy Awards	April 3, 2022	Best Traditional R&B Performance	"Fight for You" (H.E.R.)	Won	
Grammy Awards	April 3, 2022	Best Song Written for Visual Media	"Fight for You" (D'Mile, H.E.R. and Tiara Thomas)	Nominated	
Hollywood Critics Association Awards	March 5, 2021	Best Picture	Judas and the Black Messiah	Nominated	
Hollywood Critics Association Awards	March 5, 2021	Best Supporting Actor	Daniel Kaluuya	Nominated	
Hollywood Critics Association Awards	March 5, 2021	Best Male Director	Shaka King	Nominated	
Hollywood Critics Association Awards	March 5, 2021	Impact Award	Judas and the Black Messiah	Won	
Hollywood Music in Media Awards	January 27, 2021	Best Original Song in a Feature Film	"Fight for You" (D'Mile, H.E.R. and Tiara Thomas)	Nominated	
MTV Movie & TV Awards	May 16, 2021	Best Movie	Judas and the Black Messiah	Nominated	
MTV Movie & TV Awards	May 16, 2021	Best Performance in a Movie	Daniel Kaluuya	Nominated	
NAACP Image Awards	February 26, 2022	Outstanding Motion Picture	Charles D. King, Ryan Coogler and Shaka King	Nominated	
NAACP Image Awards	February 26, 2022	Outstanding Directing in a Motion Picture	Shaka King	Won	
NAACP Image Awards	February 26, 2022	Outstanding Actor in a Motion Picture	LaKeith Stanfield	Nominated	
NAACP Image Awards	February 26, 2022	Outstanding Supporting Actor in a Motion Picture	Daniel Kaluuya	Won	
NAACP Image Awards	February 26, 2022	Outstanding Supporting Actor in a Motion Picture	Algee Smith	Nominated	
NAACP Image Awards	February 26, 2022	Outstanding Supporting Actress in a Motion Picture	Dominique Fishback	Nominated	
NAACP Image Awards	February 26, 2022	Outstanding Writing in a Motion Picture	Will Berson, Shaka King, Kenny Lucas and Keith Lucas	Won	
NAACP Image Awards	February 26, 2022	Outstanding Ensemble Cast in a Motion Picture	The cast of Judas and the Black Messiah	Nominated	
NAACP Image Awards	February 26, 2022	Outstanding Soundtrack/Compilation Album	Judas and the Black Messiah Soundtrack (Mark Isham and Craig Harris)	Nominated	
National Board of Review Awards	January 26, 2021	Top 10 Films	Judas and the Black Messiah	Won	
Seattle Film Critics Society Awards	February 15, 2021	Best Supporting Actor	Judas and the Black Messiah	Won	
Seattle Film Critics Society Awards	February 15, 2021	Best Production Design	Sam Lisenco and Rebecca Brown	Nominated	
Screen Actors Guild Awards	April 4, 2021	Outstanding Performance by a Male Actor in a Supporting Role	Daniel Kaluuya	Won	
Toronto Film Critics Association Awards	February 7, 2021	Best Supporting Actor	Daniel Kaluuya	Won	
Vancouver Film Critics Circle Awards	February 22, 2021	Best Supporting Actor	Daniel Kaluuya	Won	
Washington D.C. Area Film Critics Association Awards	February 8, 2021	Best Supporting Actor	Daniel Kaluuya	Nominated	
Washington D.C. Area Film Critics Association Awards	February 8, 2021	Best Supporting Actress	Dominique Fishback	Nominated	
Writers Guild of America Awards	March 21, 2021	Best Original Screenplay	Will Berson & Shaka King and Kenny and Keith Lucas	Nominated	
