= Judy Tyrus =

American ballet dancer

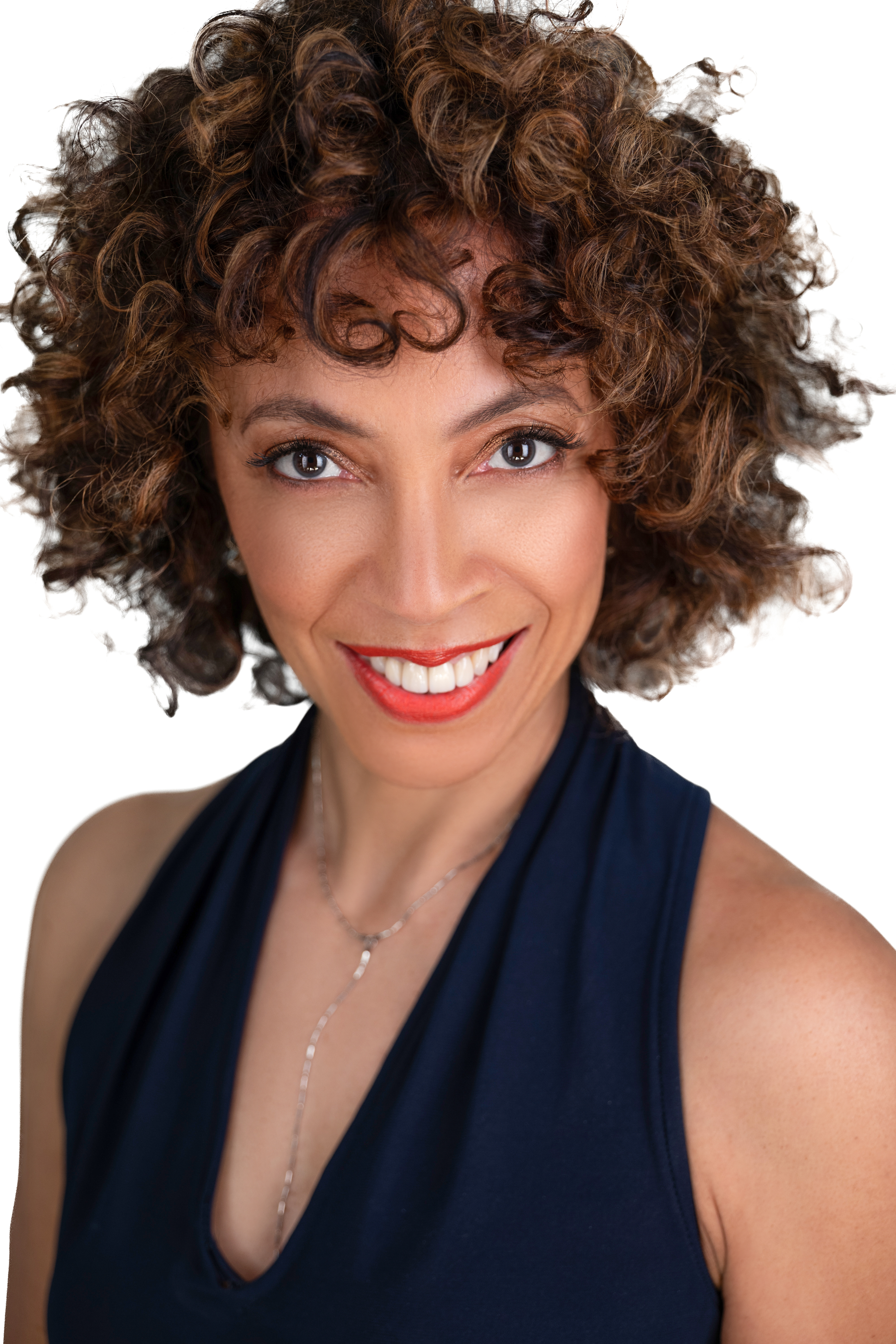
- Born: 1960 (age 65–66); Oakland, California
- Education: John F. Kennedy High School
- Occupations: Classical ballet dancer Curator; Archivist

Judy Elizabeth Tyrus (born 1960) is a classical ballet dancer who danced as a principal with the Dance Theatre of Harlem (DTH) from 1977 to 1999. She was the curator and an archivist for DTH for over eleven years. She founded ChromaDiverse, Inc., a non-profit company supporting arts, culture and theatre causes in May 2019.

== Early life and education ==
Born in Oakland, California, Tyrus, the daughter of Satoko and Jackie Tyrus, is a graduate of John F. Kennedy High School in Richmond, California. She married David Solin in 1988. They have two daughters.

== Career ==
She started dancing in 1963 when she was 3 years old and began performing with the Richmond and Oakland Ballet in 1973, dancing there through her high school years. Tyrus joined the DTH after attending a workshop with that company's artistic director Arthur Mitchell in 1977.

=== Dance Theatre of Harlem ===
Critics have almost unanimously favorably reviewed her performances.

Tyrus performed "Biosefera" at University of California, Berkeley's Zellerbach Hall in 1978. The Berkeley Gazette reviewer said her performance of the pas de deux "displayed the young performer's phenomenal level of skill and sensitivity... suggests a long and richly successful dance career". Commenting on her "impressive virtuosity", the reviewer said she emerged "as the star of this particular performance exhibiting grace and control in an outstanding and expressive realization."

The New York Times (NYT) review of a 1979 Tyrus performance in an all‐Balanchine program said, "Among the new faces in the women's ranks Judy Tyrus — petite but with strong projection — is someone to watch".

In 1983, Tyrus performed in David Lichine's ''Graduation Ball'', about which NYT reviewer Anna Kisselgoff said, "Judy Tyrus was a winning showoff." That same year, Kisselgoff said of Tyrus, "Balanchine Square Dance... give[s] us the 180-degree arabesque commonly seen in the New York City Ballet. She stands on one leg and the other opens upward in a split to form a straight line – the six o'clock arabesque Balanchine dancers have made famous."

She danced the title role of John Taras's Firebird in 1984. Reviewer Jack Anderson said, "Miss Tyrus's Firebird was a fierce, wild creature. Her feet stabbed at the floor, her fingers tore at the air... her passions and emotions were never really human ones; instead, they were always those of a being from some supernatural realm." In 1995 and 1997 Tyrus again performed Firebird in New York, again reviewed by Anderson, who wrote of the 1995 performance,"... the most memorable characterization was that of Judy Tyrus, who moved so sharply as the Firebird that every choreographic phrase resembled a shower of sparks." He wrote of the 1997 performance, "Judy Tyrus made the Firebird a wild creature. Her every step seemed to strike sparks and as she whirled about, tearing at the air with her movements, one knew that this magic bird could easily peck or claw any sorcerer to death."

Anderson also reviewed her 1986 pas de deux performance with Eddie J. Sherman in the company's "Harlem Homecoming", complementing the pair's energy, but saying, "Miss Tyrus was even slightly brittle at the outset. Then both dancers relaxed and their exuberance proved disarming."

When DTH performed Manifestations in 1987 at the Kennedy Center, reviewer Suzanne Levy wrote, "Its drama is clear and striking, yet evoked with great economy; its movement material is eclectic, and its theatrical effects are dazzling... this chamber ballet conveys the gulf between bliss and evil and what it means to the innocent to bridge that gulf... eliciting gasps and cheers from the audience."

Tyrus danced Giselle in 1989, and Kisselgoff said she had "a lovely quality to her dancing, and her Giselle was youthfully innocent in Act I and full of mercy in Act II. Her mad scene was conventional and well done, contrasting with her sparkling solo and openly confident hops on toe."

DTH performed Allegro Brillante, with a Tchaikovsky score and choreography by George Balanchine, in 1989. The review by Jennifer Dunning mentioned some problems in partnered sequences of Tyrus and Augustus van Heerden, but also said they were "redeemed by a last fine series of supported turns. But Allegro Brillante was otherwise danced to the hilt, with the dancers conveying not simply the steps and the impulse of the music but the feeling of dancing the ballet. Their pleasure was infectious." Dunning reviewed the same ballet performed three years later, writing "Judy Tyrus was a glamorous ballerina, but there were rough connective passages in her dancing."

In 1993 Alex and ra Tomalonis reviewed the Kennedy Center Opera House performance of Gisele. They wrote, "Tyrus, who's both delicate and spunky, could be the prototype for an American Giselle... she's light, though not quite ethereal, and the strength of her dancing becomes a metaphor for her courage... Her mad scene, though, was a collection of moments that didn't add up to a coherent whole... until nearly the end, and her dancing was so strong that it didn't seem plausible that her heart was failing her."

Anna Kisselgoff reviewed the 1997 performance at Aaron Davis Hall, City College, of three Balanchine ballets. She wrote, "One could admire the playfulness of Ms. Tyrus and Mr. Shellman in the Sanguinic duet... In all, pure dance with a dramatic edge."

=== Curator, archivist ===
Tyrus served as the Curator and archivist for DTH until 2015. She worked on organizing the company's legacy records, which had been dispersed throughout the building, with some stored in unsafe and inaccessible places. With grants from The Andrew W. Mellon Foundation and the National Park Service/Save America's Treasure, she worked to preserve the unique and culturally important history of the DTH.

Among her projects was the 2009 exhibition celebrating the company's fortieth anniversary, Dance Theatre of Harlem: 40 Years of Firsts, in the Vincent Astor Gallery at the New York Public Library for the Performing Arts. She said, "We were crafting something much more important than any one of us... Everything we did onstage and off was scrutinized, so nothing could be disorderly or half-baked. We strived to be the best in every way."

=== ChromaDiverse, Inc. ===
In San Francisco in May 2019, Tyrus founded ChromaDiverse, Inc., a non-profit company supporting arts, culture and theatre causes.

== See also ==
- List of New York City Ballet dancers
