= The Good Lie =

2014 film

- Theatrical release poster
- Directed by: Philippe Falardeau
- Written by: Margaret Nagle
- Produced by: Ron Howard; Brian Grazer; Karen Kehela Sherwood; Molly Smith; Thad Luckinbill; Trent Luckinbill
- Starring: Reese Witherspoon; Arnold Oceng; Ger Duany; Emmanuel Jal; Corey Stoll
- Cinematography: Ronald Plante
- Edited by: Richard Comeau
- Music by: Martin Léon
- Production companies: Alcon Entertainment; Imagine Entertainment; Black Label Media; Reliance Entertainment
- Distributed by: Warner Bros. Pictures (United States); Summit Entertainment (International)
- Release dates: September 7, 2014 (TIFF); October 3, 2014 (United States)
- Running time: 110 minutes
- Countries: United States; India
- Language: English
- Box office: $3.2 million

The Good Lie is a 2014 drama film written by Margaret Nagle and directed by Philippe Falardeau. The film stars Reese Witherspoon in the lead role, alongside Arnold Oceng, Ger Duany, Emmanuel Jal, and Corey Stoll. Witherspoon portrays a woman who helps four Sudanese refugees find jobs and adjust to life in the United States.

The Good Lie was screened in the Special Presentations section of the 2014 Toronto International Film Festival before being released on October 3, 2014. Critical reception was largely positive. Another major screening was held by the Greenwich International Film Festival on October 22, 2014, for the benefit of the U.S. Fund for UNICEF.

== Plot ==
During the Second Sudanese Civil War, siblings Mamere, Paul, Jeremiah, Theo, Daniel, and Abital escape after their family is killed and village destroyed. After three months of walking in the wilderness, they join a group of refugees but have to leave after they are caught by soldiers and many people are killed. After sleeping in the grassland, Mamere gets spotted by two soldiers. Theo quickly hides the siblings in the grass and comes out, claiming to be alone, before he is taken in to custody by the soldiers. The group eventually arrives at Kakuma Refugee Camp in Kenya, where Daniel succumbs to an illness and dies. Thirteen years later, among the thousands in the camp, the siblings are accepted for relocation to the United States.

On arrival in New York City, Abital is unexpectedly told that she is to leave for Boston where a family awaits, as she is only blood related to one of her brothers. As their sister tearfully leaves, Jeremiah, Mamere, and Paul board the flight to Kansas City and meet Carrie Davis, a brash employment counselor who helps them find jobs, and Pamela, who provides them with their house and support. Carrie introduces the brothers to Jack, a ranch owner who looks after his father's ranch, which amazes the brothers. Jeremiah teaches Sunday school at a local church and works at a grocery store, but later quits when he's caught giving recently expired food to a homeless person rather than throwing it away as he was told to. Paul works at a factory and makes friends with his co-workers, where he is exposed to drugs due to their initial jealousy of his skills. Mamere takes two jobs at a store and as a security guard to pay for his aspiration to become a medical doctor. Initially rude, Carrie learns more about their situation and begins to warm up to the brothers. Paul eventually loses his job when the factory replaces him with automated machines. Frustrated with his sister not being with them, Paul destroys a public phone and gets arrested. After being bailed out by Carrie, Paul and Mamere get into a fight, with Paul blaming Mamere for getting Theo caught by the soldiers. Eventually, Mamere and Paul reconcile at Jack's ranch. During Christmas, Carrie arranges with the agency to get Abital back to reunite with the brothers.

Abital receives an anonymous letter stating that someone entered the refugee camp in Kenya searching for the group. Thinking it is Theo, Mamere travels to Nairobi and searches the refugee camp after they tell him that Theo is not registered. After meeting James, an old friend, he asks him to find his brother. Due to complications with the program stemming from the 9/11 attacks, Mamere is required to ask for help from an African embassy on good terms with the US to acquire a passport and documents for Theo's potential return. Eventually, James is able to find Theo and reunites him with Mamere, and the two travel to the airport to go to the US. In the airport, Mamere reveals to Theo that he could not get him a passport and instead gives Theo his own passport - a deception that is the 'good lie'. Mamere bids his brother farewell and watches Theo's plane depart. Mamere calls Carrie and explains to her what he's done. Upon his arrival in the United States, Theo has a tearful reunion with his siblings; Mamere remains in Kenya, content he made the right decision.

== Cast ==
- Reese Witherspoon as Carrie Davis
- Ger Duany as Jeremiah
- Arnold Oceng as Mamere
- Emmanuel Jal as Paul
- Kuoth Wiel as Abital
- Femi Oguns as Theo
- Corey Stoll as Jack
- Sarah Baker as Pamela
- Mike Pniewski as Nick

== Reception ==
On Rotten Tomatoes, the film has an approval rating of 84% based on 89 reviews and an average rating of 6.7/10. The website's critical consensus reads, "The Good Lie sacrifices real-life nuance in order to turn its true story into a Hollywood production, but the results still add up to a compelling, well-acted, and deeply moving drama." On Metacritic, the film has a score of 65 out of 100 based on 30 critics, indicating "generally favorable reviews" from critics. Audiences polled by CinemaScore gave the film a rare average grade of "A+" on an A+ to F scale.

Margaret Nagle won the Writers Guild of America Paul Selvin Award for her script to this film.

== Copyright and fraud lawsuit ==
In February 2015, the Foundation for Lost Boys and Girls of Sudan, Inc., acting on behalf of 54 Sudanese refugees, filed a lawsuit in Georgia against writer Margaret Nagle, Alcon Entertainment, and Imagine Entertainment. The suit claimed that the refugees were joint authors of the stories they had told Nagle in interviews that she had recorded and used to write the story. It also asserted that a joint venture agreement had been breached, with fraud and other issues arising from a promise of compensation from a producer.

The US District Judge initially granted the defendant's motion to dismiss but allowed the suit to be refiled if the plaintiffs subsequently and successfully registered the copyright of the interviews.

The court ultimately found that the refugees' statements supported the finding of copyright infringement and a permanent injunction on the movie. Before the case could be concluded, however, the plaintiffs' claims were settled out of court.

== See also ==
- Lost Boys of Sudan
- Forced displacement in popular culture
