= Shaka King =

American filmmaker (born 1980)

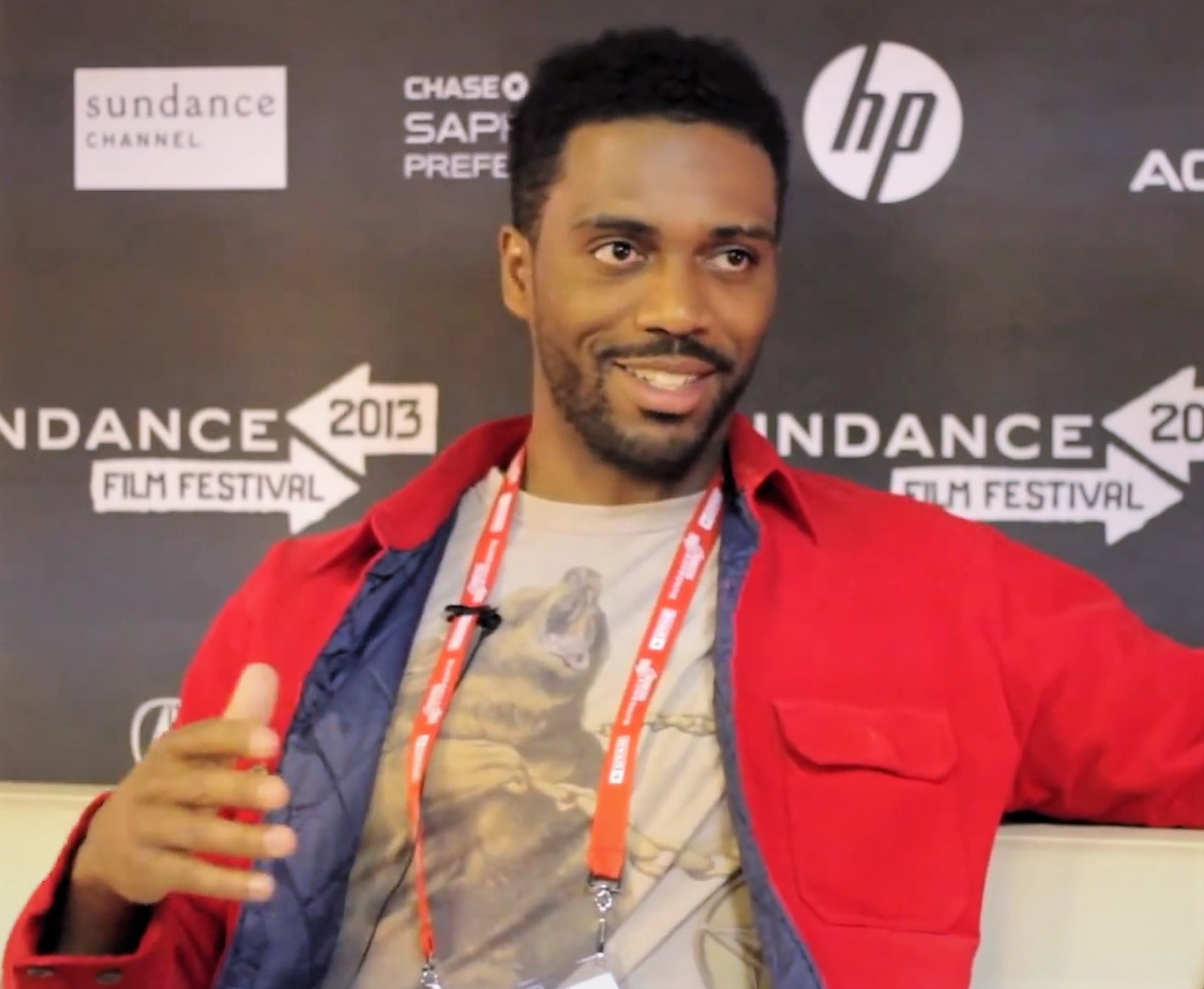
- King at the 2013 Sundance Film Festival
- Born: March 7, 1980 (age 46); New York City, U.S.
- Education: New York University; Vassar College
- Occupations: Filmmaker; writer; director
- Years active: 2009–present

Shaka King (born March 7, 1980) is an American film director, screenwriter, and film producer. He is best known for directing and co-writing the 2021 biopic Judas and the Black Messiah.

== Biography ==
An only child, King was born on March 7, 1980 in Crown Heights and grew up in Bedford-Stuyvesant, both in Brooklyn, New York City. His mother's family was from Barbados and Panama, while his father's family was from Panama. Both parents worked as public school teachers and were "very Afrocentric." King's early education occurred in the neighborhoods of East Harlem and Fort Greene. He attended a predominantly white preparatory school in Bay Ridge during his middle and high school years. It was in high school that he discovered his passion for creative writing.

King studied political science and took his first film production course at Vassar College. After graduating, he practiced screenwriting while working as a youth counselor and tutor. In 2007, he entered a graduate film program at New York University Tisch School of the Arts where he was a student of Spike Lee. King's thesis for his Masters of Fine Arts resulted in the feature film Newlyweeds.

King currently lives in Brooklyn.

== Career ==
King's debut feature film Newlyweeds is about a free-spirited young couple who live in Bedford-Stuyvesant and who prefer to indulge in marijuana and hashish. The film premiered at the 2013 Sundance Film Festival. He presented his next film, Mulignans, in the USA Narrative Short Films program at the 2015 Sundance Film Festival. His 2017 short film LaZercism, starring Lakeith Stanfield, tells of a world in which white people suffer from “racial glaucoma.” Stanfield also appears in King's second feature film, Judas and the Black Messiah, in which Daniel Kaluuya plays the role of Fred Hampton. The feature was nominated for six Academy Awards, including specific nods for King for Best Original Screenplay, and Best Picture. More recently, he got a first-look deal with FX Productions to develop television.

Angelique Jackson of Variety has noted that King is one of those "Black filmmakers [who] are offering an unvarnished look at the legacy of the 1960s civil rights era, examining America’s tortured history of racism ..."

== Filmography ==
Short film

Year	Title	Director	Writer	Producer
2009	Mariachi	No	No	Yes
2009	Cocoa Loco	Yes	No	No
2010	Herkimer DuFrayne 7th Grade Guidance Counselor	Yes	Yes	Yes
2015	Mulignans	Yes	Yes	Yes
2017	LaZercism	Yes	Yes	Yes

Feature film

Year	Title	Director	Writer	Producer
2013	Newlyweeds	Yes	Yes	Yes
2021	Judas and the Black Messiah	Yes	Yes	Yes

Television

Year	Title	Director	Writer	Notes
2016	High Maintenance	Yes	Yes	2 episodes
2016–2017	People of Earth	Yes	No	5 episodes
2018	Random Acts of Flyness	Yes	Yes	Directed 1 episode, wrote 2 episodes
2019–2020	Shrill	Yes	No	4 episodes

== Awards and nominations ==
Year	Award	Title	Category	Result	Ref
2020	NAACP Image Awards	Shrill	Outstanding Directing in a Comedy Series	Nominated	
2021	Academy Awards	Judas and the Black Messiah	Best Picture	Nominated	
2021	Academy Awards	Judas and the Black Messiah	Best Original Screenplay	Nominated	
2021	Producers Guild of America Awards	Judas and the Black Messiah	Best Theatrical Motion Picture	Nominated	
2021	Writers Guild of America Awards	Judas and the Black Messiah	Best Original Screenplay	Nominated	
