= Assassination of Fred Hampton =

1969 murder in Chicago, U.S.

- Part of the COINTELPRO operation against the Black Panther Party/Rainbow Coalition
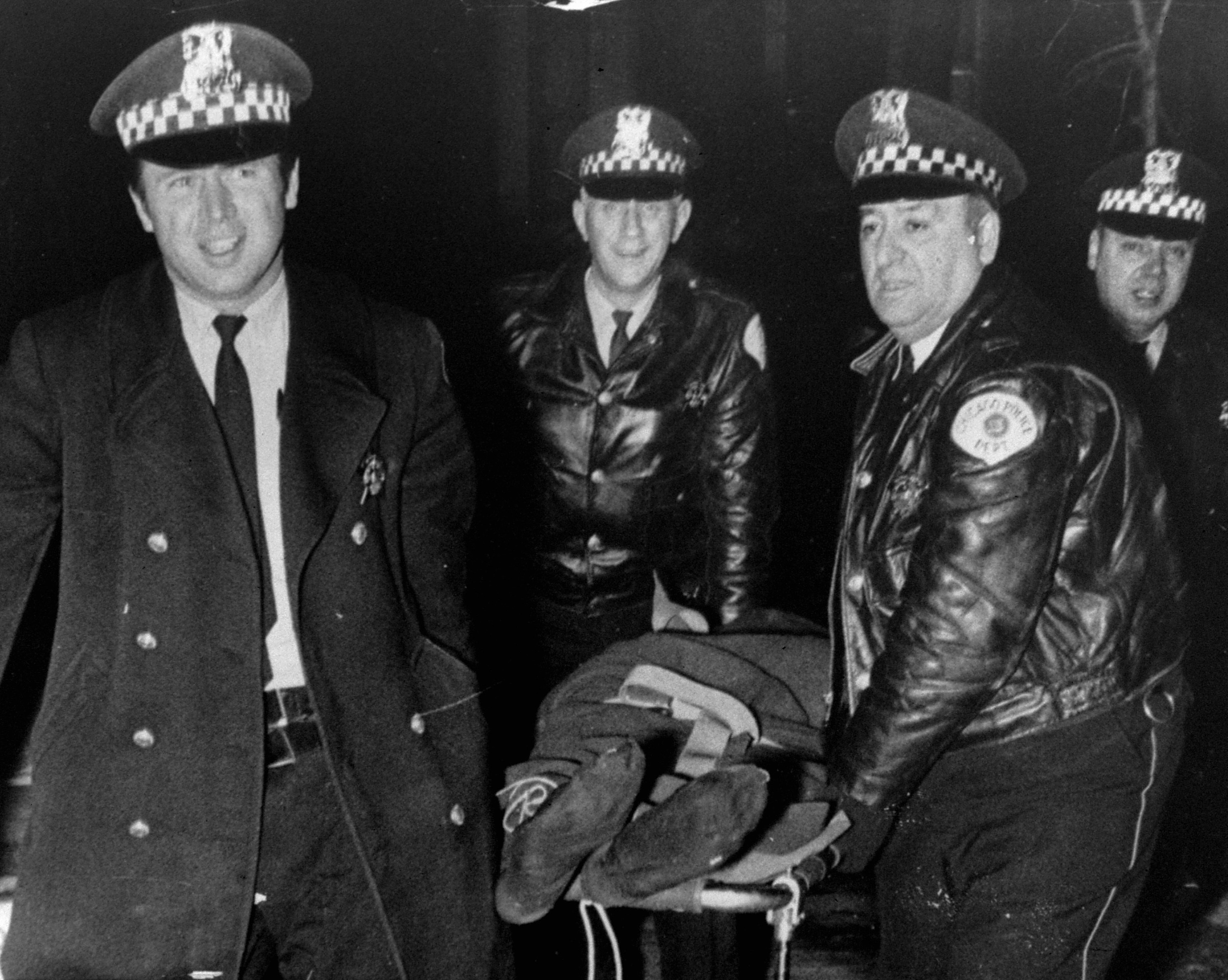
- Fred Hampton being taken away by the Chicago police on a stretcher after the shooting, 1969
- Location: 41.87972924074592°N 87.68535154552444°W; 2337 W. Monroe St., Chicago, Illinois, U.S.
- Date: December 4, 1969; 56 years ago c. 4:45 a.m. (CST)
- Target: Fred Hampton
- Attack type: Assassination, murder by shooting
- Weapon: Various firearms
- Deaths: Fred Hampton (aged 21); Mark Clark (aged 22)
- Injuries: 7 (Verlina Brewer, Ronald "Doc" Satchel, Blair Anderson, Brenda Harris, Louis Truelock, Harold Bell, and Deborah Johnson)
- Victims: 9 (Fredrick Allen Hampton Sr., Mark Clark, Verlina Brewer, Ronald "Doc" Satchel, Blair Anderson, Brenda Harris, Louis Truelock, Harold Bell, and Deborah Johnson)
- Perpetrators: FBI; William O'Neal (FBI informant); Chicago Police Department; Cook County State's Attorney's Office (Edward Hanrahan)
- Motive: COINTELPRO operation to neutralize the Black Panther Party
- Inquiry: Coroner's inquest
- Verdict: Justifiable homicide (coroner's inquest)
- Sentence: N/A
- Convicted: No one convicted

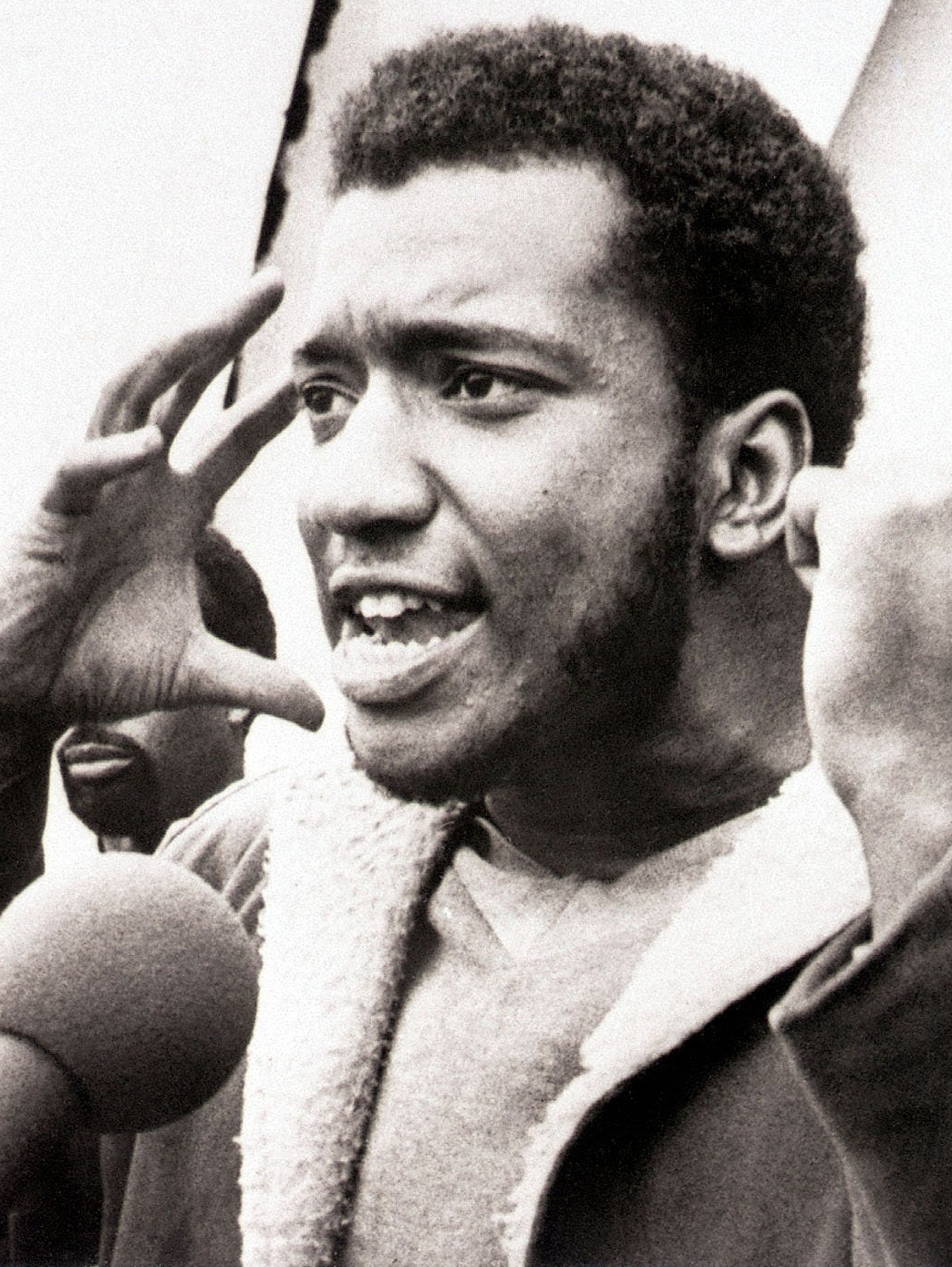
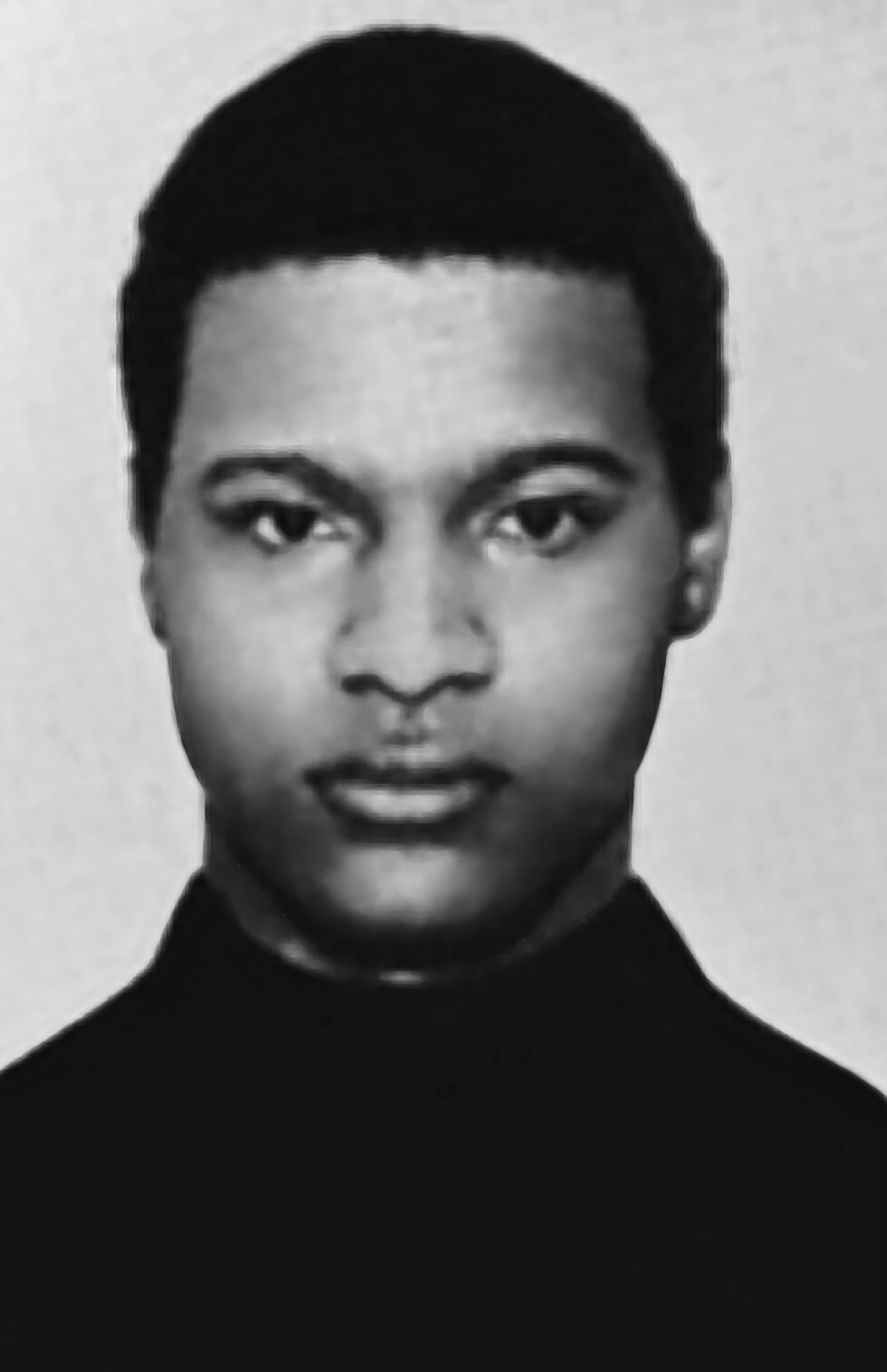
Fred Hampton on the left; Mark Clark on the right

On December 4, 1969, Fred Hampton, a Marxist-Leninist African American activist, chairman of the Black Panther Party's Illinois chapter, and founder of the Rainbow Coalition, was shot and killed in his sleep during a predawn police raid at his apartment in Chicago, Illinois. He was 21 years old. Also killed was fellow Panther Mark Clark, who was on security duty. The raid was conducted by a team of 14 officers from the Chicago Police Department and the Cook County State's Attorney's office, organized by State's Attorney Edward Hanrahan, and orchestrated with the assistance of the FBI as part of its COINTELPRO program to neutralize the Black Panther Party and Rainbow Coalition.

The police claimed they had been attacked by the Panthers and defended themselves accordingly, this claim was later disproven. An internal investigation was undertaken, and the police claimed that their colleagues on the assault team were exonerated of any wrongdoing, concluding that they "used lawful means to overcome the assault." A coroner's jury ruled the deaths justifiable homicide, but a subsequent federal grand jury criticized the police action as "ill-conceived". A 1982 civil lawsuit brought by the survivors and the families of Hampton and Clark resulted in a $1.85 million settlement from the City of Chicago, Cook County, and the federal government. No one was ever criminally convicted for the killings. The assassination came less than a year after the assassination of Robert F. Kennedy in 1968, and less than a year before the police shootings of students at Kent State University in 1970.

== Prelude ==
Throughout 1969, Fred Hampton's prominence as a leader of the Black Panther Party (BPP) in Chicago grew, and he became a target of the FBI's COINTELPRO program, which aimed to "expose, disrupt, misdirect, discredit, or otherwise neutralize" the activities of black nationalist groups.

On the night of November 13, 1969, while Hampton was in California, Chicago police officers John J. Gilhooly and Frank G. Rappaport were killed in a gun battle with Panthers; one died the next day. A total of nine police officers were shot. Spurgeon Winter Jr, a 19-year-old Panther, was killed by police. Another Panther, Lawrence S. Bell, was charged with murder. In an unsigned editorial headlined "No Quarter for Wild Beasts", the Chicago Tribune urged that Chicago police officers approaching suspected Panthers "should be ordered to be ready to shoot."

In late November 1969, Clark made the decision to go to Chicago following the death of Panther Spurgeon "Jake" Winters, who had just been killed by the Chicago Police Department in a shootout that claimed the lives of two police officers. Clark's family and friends, as well as Clark himself, knew that the party had likely been infiltrated by the FBI and that his life was in danger upon arriving in Chicago. As he prepared to return to Chicago on Thanksgiving Day, November 27, Clark told family members, "I probably won't see ya'll again, but just know that I love all of you."

As part of the larger COINTELPRO operation, the FBI was determined to prevent any improvement in the effectiveness of the BPP leadership. The FBI had obtained detailed information about Hampton's apartment, including a layout of furniture, from a turncoat informant, William O'Neal, who had infiltrated the Chicago chapter. An augmented, 14-man team of the State's Attorney's Special Prosecutions Unit was organized for a predawn raid; they were armed with a search warrant for illegal weapons.

On the evening of December 3, Hampton taught a political education course at a local church, which was attended by most Panther members. Afterward, as was typical, he was accompanied to his Monroe Street apartment by Johnson and several Panthers: Blair Anderson, James Grady, Ronald "Doc" Satchell, Harold Bell, Verlina Brewer, Louis Truelock, Brenda Harris and Mark Clark. O'Neal was already there, having prepared a late dinner, which the group ate around midnight. O'Neal had slipped the secobarbital into a drink that Hampton consumed during the dinner to sedate Hampton so he would not awaken during the subsequent raid. O'Neal left after dinner. At about 1:30 a.m., December 4, Hampton fell asleep mid-sentence while talking to his mother on the telephone.

Although Hampton was not known to take drugs, Cook County chemist Eleanor Berman later reported that she had run two tests, each showing evidence of barbiturates in Hampton's blood. An FBI chemist failed to find similar traces, but Berman stood by her findings.

== Assassination ==
=== Raid ===
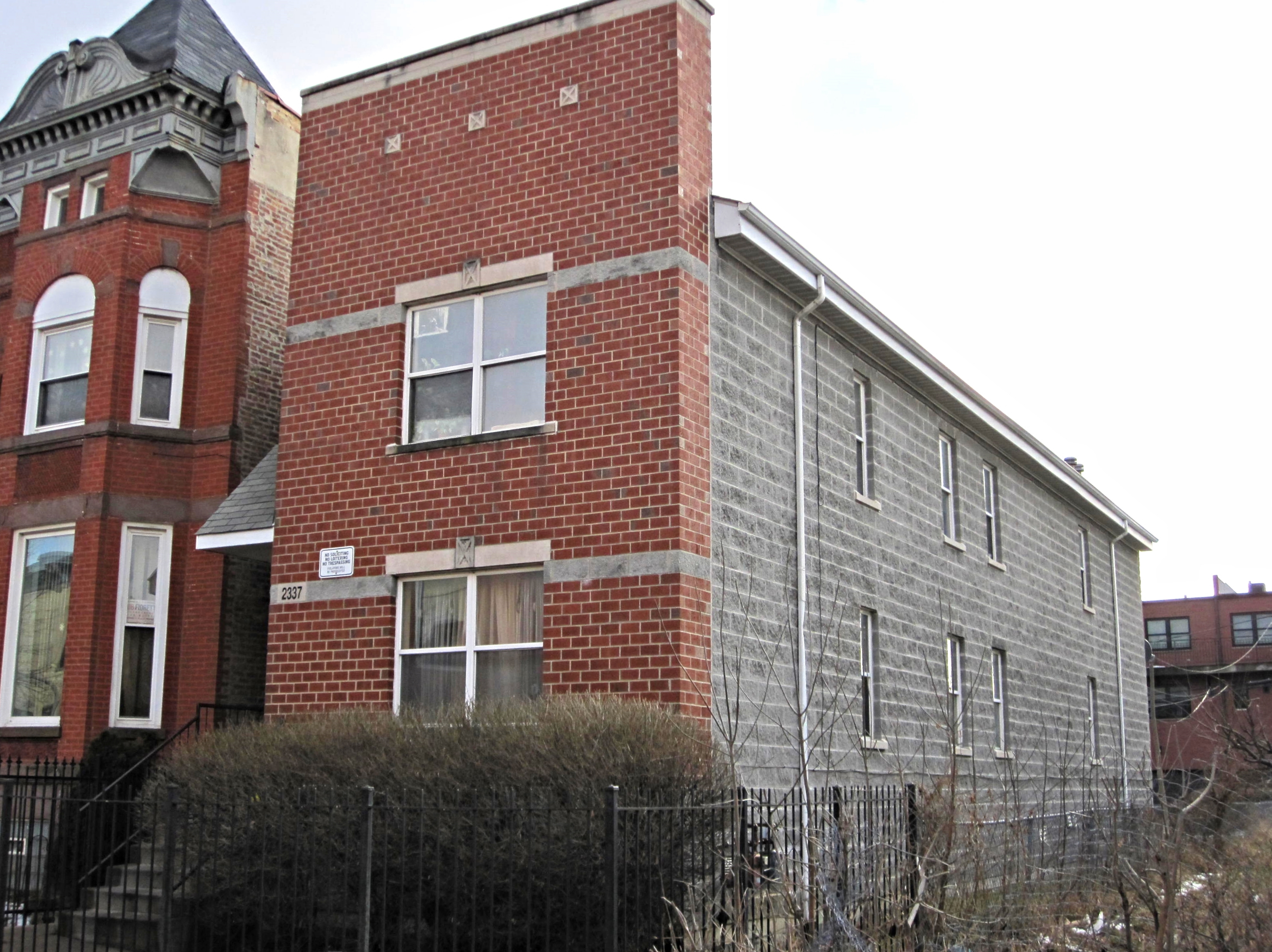
Site of Black Panther Party Raid, Fred Hampton's Death

The office of Cook County State's Attorney Edward Hanrahan organized the raid, using officers attached to his office. Hampton had recently strongly criticized Hanrahan, saying that Hanrahan's talk about a "war on gangs" was really rhetoric used to enable him to carry out a "war on black youth".

At 4 a.m., the heavily armed police team arrived at the site, divided into two teams, eight for the front of the building and six for the rear. At 4:45 a.m., they stormed the apartment. Mark Clark (22), sitting in the front room of the apartment with a shotgun in his lap, was on security duty. The police shot him in the chest, killing him instantly. An alternative account said that Clark answered the door and police immediately shot him. Either way, Clark's gun discharged once into the ceiling. This single round was fired when he suffered a reflexive death-convulsion after being shot. This was the only shot fired by the Panthers.

Fred Hampton, drugged by barbiturates, was sleeping on a mattress in the bedroom with his fiancée Deborah Johnson (18) who was eight and a half months pregnant with their child. Police officers removed her from the room while Hampton lay unconscious in bed. Then the raiding team fired at the head of the south bedroom. Hampton was wounded in the shoulder by the shooting. According to the National Archives and Records Administration, "upon that discovery, an officer shot him twice in his head and killed him."

Fellow Black Panther Harold Bell said that he heard the following exchange:

"That's Fred Hampton."

"Is he dead?... Bring him out."

"He's barely alive."

"He'll make it."

The injured Panthers said they heard two shots. According to Hampton's supporters, the shots were fired point-blank at Hampton's head. According to Johnson, an officer then said: "He's good and dead now."

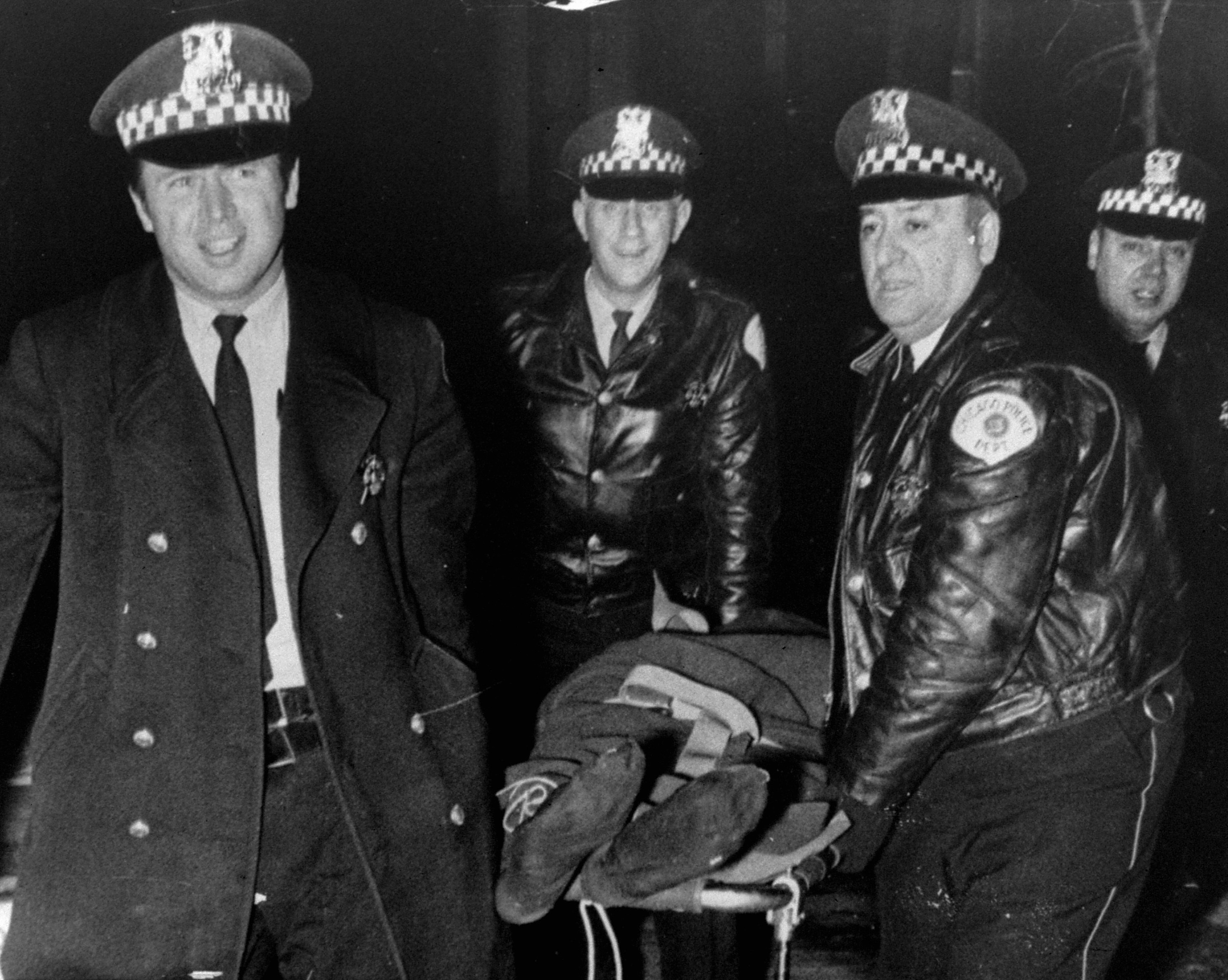
Chicago police removing Hampton's body

Hampton's body was dragged into the bedroom doorway and left in a pool of blood. The officers directed their gunfire at the remaining Panthers who had been sleeping in the north bedroom. This included Ronald "Doc" Satchel (18), Blair Anderson (18), Verlina Brewer (17), and Brenda Harris (19). Brewer, Satchel, Anderson, and Harris were seriously wounded, then beaten and dragged into the street. They were arrested on charges of aggravated assault and attempted murder of the officers. They were each held on $100,000 bail.

In the early 1990s, Jose "Cha Cha" Jimenez, founder of the Young Lords, a Puerto Rican separatist street gang, who had developed close ties to Hampton and the Chicago Black Panther Party during the late 1960s, interviewed Johnson about the raid. She said:

I believe Fred Hampton was drugged. The reason why is because when he woke up when the person [Truelock] said, "Chairman, chairman," he was shaking Fred's arm, you know, Fred's arm was folded across the head of the bed. And Fred—he just raised his head up real slow. It was like watching a slow motion. He raised. His eyes were open. He raised his head up real slow, you know, with his eyes toward the entranceway, toward the bedroom and laid his head back down. That was the only movement he made [...]

The seven Panthers who survived the raid were indicted by a grand jury on charges of attempted murder, armed violence, and other weapons charges. These charges were subsequently dropped. During the trial, the Chicago Police Department claimed that the Panthers were the first to fire shots, but a later investigation found that the Chicago police fired between 90 and 99 shots, while the only Panthers shot was from Clark's dropped shotgun.

After the raid, the apartment was left unguarded. The Panthers sent some members to investigate, accompanied by videographer Mike Gray and stills photographer Norris McNamara to document the scene. The footage was later released as part of the 1971 documentary The Murder of Fred Hampton. After a break-in at an FBI office in Pennsylvania, the existence of COINTELPRO, an illegal counter-intelligence program, was revealed and reported. With this program revealed, many activists and others began to suspect that the police raid and Hampton's killing were conducted under this program. One of the documents released after the break-in was a floor plan of Hampton's apartment. Another document outlined a deal that the FBI brokered with U.S. deputy attorney general Richard Kleindienst to conceal the FBI's role in Hampton's death and the existence of COINTELPRO.

=== Aftermath ===
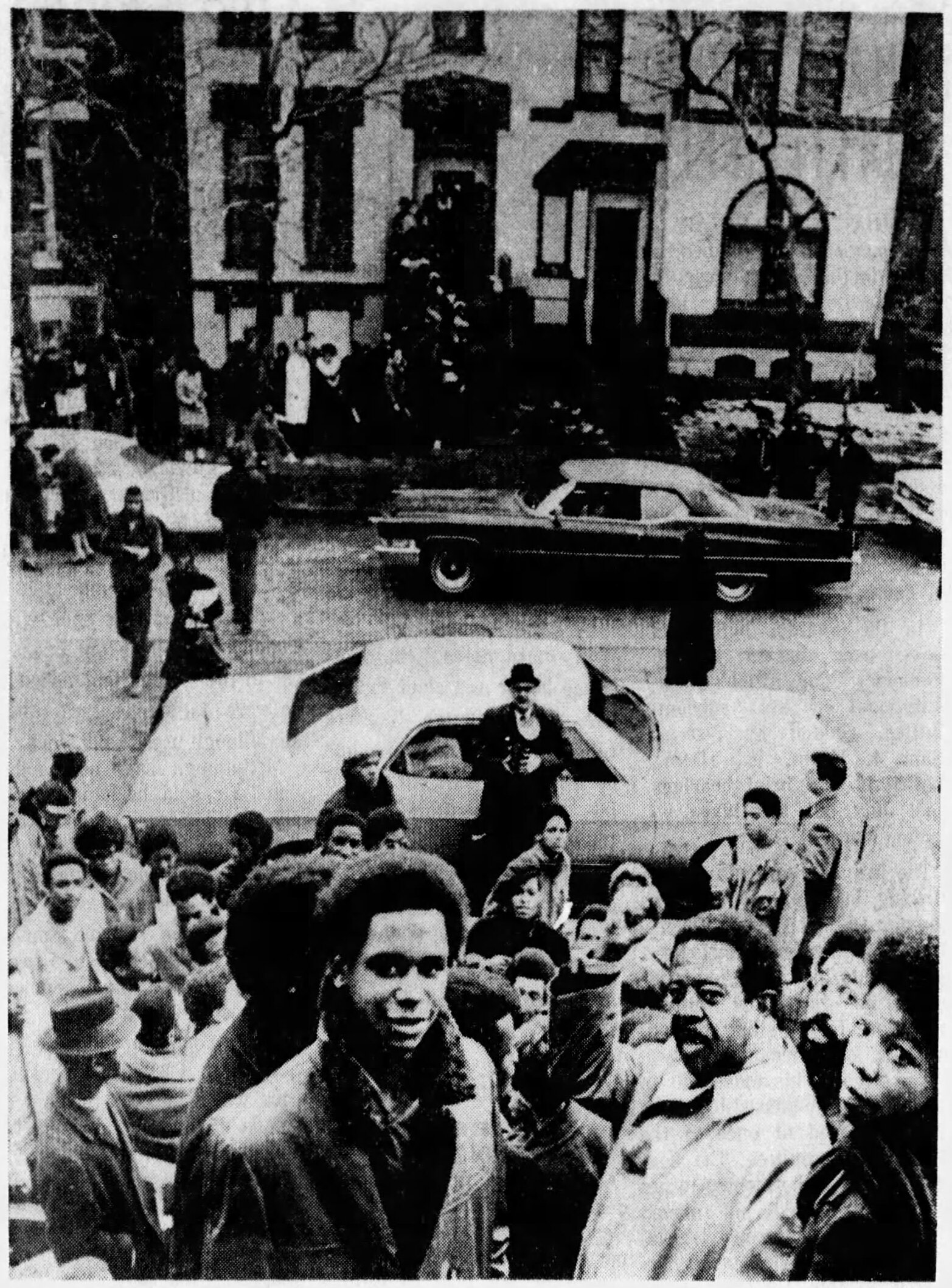
Black panthers invited people to visit the apartment of Fred Hampton to investigate the murder scene themselves

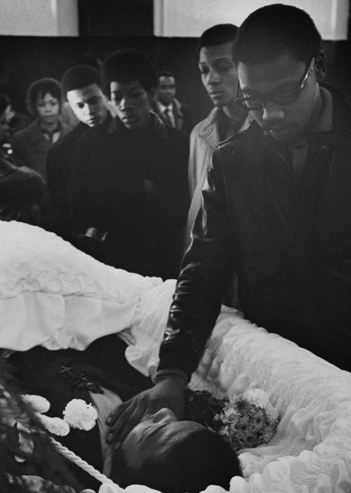
Mourners passing the bier of Hampton. His funeral in December was attended by over 5,000 people.

At a press conference the next day, the police announced the arrest team had been attacked by the "violent" and "extremely vicious" Panthers and defended themselves accordingly. In a second press conference on December 8, the police leadership praised the assault team for their "remarkable restraint", "bravery", and "professional discipline" in not killing all the Panthers present. Photographic evidence was presented of "bullet holes" allegedly made by shots fired by the Panthers, but reporters soon challenged this claim. An internal investigation was undertaken, and the police claimed that their colleagues on the assault team were exonerated of any wrongdoing, concluding that they "used lawful means to overcome the assault."

Five thousand people attended Hampton's funeral. He was eulogized by black leaders, including Jesse Jackson and Ralph Abernathy, Martin Luther King Jr.'s successor as head of the Southern Christian Leadership Conference. In his eulogy, Jackson said that "when Fred was shot in Chicago, black people in particular, and decent people in general, bled everywhere." On December 6, members of the Weather Underground destroyed numerous police vehicles in a retaliatory bombing spree at 3600 N. Halsted Street, Chicago.

The police called their raid on Hampton's apartment a "shootout". The Black Panthers called it a "shoot-in", because so many shots were fired by police.

Four weeks after witnessing Hampton's death at the hands of the police, Johnson gave birth to their son, Fred Hampton Jr.

== Reactions ==
Reactions to Hampton's assassination were varied.

Civil rights activists Roy Wilkins and Ramsey Clark, styled as "The Commission of Inquiry into the Black Panthers and the Police", alleged that the Chicago police had killed Hampton without justification or provocation and had violated the Panthers' constitutional rights against unreasonable search and seizure. "The Commission" further alleged that the Chicago Police Department had imposed a summary punishment on the Panthers.

On December 11 and 12, the two competing daily newspapers, the Chicago Tribune and the Chicago Sun-Times, published vivid accounts of the events but drew different conclusions. The Tribune has long been considered the politically conservative newspaper, and the Sun-Times the liberal paper. On December 11, the Tribune published a page 1 article titled, "Exclusive – Hanrahan, Police Tell Panther Story". The article included photographs supplied by Hanrahan's office that depicted bullet holes in a thin white curtain and door jamb as evidence that the Panthers fired multiple bullets at the police.

Jack Challem, editor of the Wright College News, the student newspaper at Wright Junior College in Chicago, had visited the apartment on December 6, when it was still unsecured. He took numerous photographs of the crime scenes. A member of the Black Panthers was allowing visitors to tour the apartment. Challem's photographs did not show the bullet holes reported by the Tribune. On the morning of December 12, after the Tribune article had appeared with the Hanrahan-supplied photos, Challem contacted a reporter at the Sun-Times, showed him his own photographs, and encouraged the other reporter to visit the apartment. That evening, the Sun-Times published a page 1 article with the headline: "Those 'bullet holes' aren't." According to the article, the alleged bullet holes (supposedly the result of the Panthers shooting in the direction of the police) were nail heads.

A federal grand jury did not return any indictment against any of the individuals involved with the planning or execution of the raid, including the officers involved in killing Hampton. O'Neal, who had given the FBI the floor plan of the apartment and drugged Hampton, later admitted his involvement in setting up the raid. He committed suicide on January 15, 1990.

== Inquest ==
Shortly after the raid, Cook County Coroner Andrew Toman began forming a special six-member coroner's jury to hold an inquest into the deaths of Hampton and Clark. On December 23, Toman announced four additions to the jury, who included two African-American men: physician Theodore K. Lawless and attorney Julian B. Wilkins, the son of J. Ernest Wilkins Sr. He said the four were selected from a group of candidates submitted to his office by groups and individuals representing both Chicago's black and white communities. Civil rights leaders and spokesmen for the black community were reportedly disappointed with the selection.

An official with the Chicago Urban League said, "I would have had more confidence in the jury if one of them had been a black man who has a rapport with the young and the grass roots in the community." Gus Savage said that such a man to whom the community could relate need not be black. The jury eventually included a third black man, who had been a member of the first coroner's jury sworn in on December 4.

The blue-ribbon panel convened for the inquest on January 6, 1970. On January 21, they ruled the deaths of Hampton and Clark to be justifiable homicides. The jury qualified their verdict on Hampton's death as "based solely and exclusively on the evidence presented to this inquisition"; police and expert witnesses provided the only testimony during the inquest.

Jury foreman James T. Hicks stated that they could not consider the charges made by surviving Black Panthers who had been in the apartment; they had told reporters that the police had entered the apartment shooting. The survivors were reported to have refused to testify during the inquest because they faced criminal charges of attempted murder and aggravated assault during the raid. Attorneys for the Hampton and Clark families did not introduce any witnesses during the proceedings but called the inquest "a well-rehearsed theatrical performance designed to vindicate the police officers". Hanrahan said the verdict was recognition "of the truthfulness of our police officers' account of the events".

== Federal grand jury ==
Released on May 15, 1970, the reports of a federal grand jury criticized the actions of the police, the surviving Black Panthers, and the Chicago news media. The grand jury called the police department's raid "ill conceived" and said many errors were committed during the post-raid investigation and reconstruction of the events. It said that the surviving Black Panthers' refusal to cooperate hampered the investigation, and that the press "improperly and grossly exaggerated stories".

== 1970 civil rights lawsuit ==
In 1970, the survivors and relatives of Hampton and Clark filed a civil suit, stating that the civil rights of the Black Panther members were violated by the joint police/FBI raid and seeking $47.7 million in damages. Twenty-eight defendants were named, including Hanrahan as well as the City of Chicago, Cook County, and federal governments. It took years for the case to get to trial, which lasted 18 months. It was reported to have been the longest federal trial up to that time. After its conclusion in 1977, Judge Joseph Sam Perry of the United States District Court for the Northern District of Illinois dismissed the suit against 21 of the defendants before jury deliberations. After jurors deadlocked on a verdict, Perry dismissed the suit against the remaining defendants.

The plaintiffs appealed. In 1979, the United States Court of Appeals for the Seventh Circuit in Chicago found that the government had withheld relevant documents, thereby obstructing the judicial process. Reinstating the case against 24 of the defendants, the Court of Appeals ordered a new trial. The Supreme Court of the United States heard an appeal by defendants but voted 5–3 in 1980 to remand the case to the District Court for a new trial.

In 1982, the City of Chicago, Cook County, and the federal government agreed to a settlement in which each would pay $616,333 (equivalent to $2.06 million per payee in 2025) to a group of nine plaintiffs, including the mothers of Hampton and Clark. The $1.85 million settlement (equivalent to $6.17 million in 2025) was believed to be the largest ever in a civil rights case. G. Flint Taylor, one of the attorneys representing the plaintiffs, said, "The settlement is an admission of the conspiracy that existed between the FBI and Hanrahan's men to murder Fred Hampton." Assistant United States Attorney Robert Gruenberg said the settlement was intended to avoid another costly trial and was not an admission of guilt or responsibility by any of the defendants.

== Allegations of conspiracy ==
Ten days after Hampton was killed, Bobby Rush, the then deputy minister of defense for the Illinois Black Panther Party, called the raiding party an "execution squad".

Michael Newton is among the writers who have concluded that Hampton was assassinated. In his 2016 book Unsolved Civil Rights Murder Cases, 1934–1970, Newton writes that Hampton "was murdered in his sleep by Chicago police with FBI collusion." This view is also presented in Jakobi Williams's book From the Bullet to the Ballot: The Illinois Chapter of the Black Panther Party and Racial Coalition Politics in Chicago.

== See also ==
- Assassination of Malcolm X
- Assassination of Martin Luther King Jr.
- Black Panther Party
- Rainbow Coalition

== Bibliography ==
- Haas, Jeffrey (2009). The Assassination of Fred Hampton: How the FBI and the Chicago Police Murdered a Black Panther. Chicago Review Press. ISBN 9781569763650.
- Wilderson, Frank (2015). Incognegro — A Memoir of Exile and Apartheid. Duke University Press. ISBN 978-0-8223-5993-7.
- "Fred Hampton (August 30, 1948 - December 4, 1969)". National Archives and Records Administration. August 25, 2016. Archived from the original on February 11, 2021.
