= Murder to Excellence =

Song by Jay-Z and Kanye West

from the album Watch the Throne
- Released: August 8, 2011
- Recorded: 2011
- Studio: Real World (Wiltshire, UK); (The Mercer) Hotel (New York)
- Genre: Hip-hop
- Length: 5:00
- Label: Roc-A-Fella; Roc Nation; Def Jam
- Songwriters: Kanye West; Shawn Carter; Kasseem Dean; Larry Griffin, Jr.; Scott Mescudi; Quincy Jones; Harvey Mason, Jr.; Joel Rosenbaum; Caiphus Semenya; Bill Summers; Mihaela Modorcea; Gabriela Modorcea
- Producers: Swizz Beatz; S1

"Murder to Excellence" is a song by American rappers Jay-Z and Kanye West from their collaborative studio album, Watch the Throne (2011). The song features additional vocals from Kid Cudi. It was produced by Swizz Beatz and S1, who served as co-writers with the rappers and Kid Cudi, with additional credits for Mihaela and Gabriela Modorcea, Quincy Jones, Harvey Mason, Jr., Joel Rosenbaum, Caiphus Semenya, and Bill Summers due to them having composed sampled works. The song originated from Swizz Beatz's "Black on Black Murder" and S1's "Black Excellence" after West suggested to combine them, leading to it being split into the separate parts of "Murder" and "Excellence" from the producers. A hip-hop song with experimental elements and raw beats, it samples Indiggo's "La La La" and Jones' "Celie Shaves Mr./Scarification".

For the first part of the song, Jay-Z and West address black-on-black violence and the police shooting of Danroy Henry. On the second part, the rappers celebrate their definitions of black excellence despite remaining problems. "Murder to Excellence" received lukewarm reviews from music critics, who generally commended the subject matter of violence. Some highlighted the lack of self-focus and West comparing Chicago's homicides to Iraq's deaths of US soldiers, while a few reviewers found the song to be inconsistent. The song received a nomination for Impact Track at the 2012 BET Hip Hop Awards. Jay-Z and West performed it during their Watch the Throne Tour (2011–2012). The song was used in the trailer for the DC superhero film, Black Adam (2022).

== Background and recording ==
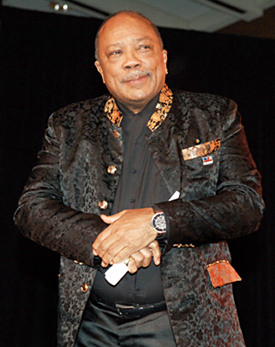
Swizz Beatz likened working on the song with Jay-Z and West to being in the studio with Quincy Jones and Michael Jackson at the same time, the former of whom is pictured above.

Jay-Z and West are both American rappers who have collaborated on several tracks together, such as the singles "Swagga Like Us" (2008), "Run This Town" (2009), and "Monster" (2010). In 2010, the two began production and recording together for a collaborative record titled Watch the Throne. "Murder to Excellence" serves as a tribute from them to 20–year old college student Danroy Henry, who was unarmed when police of Westchester County, New York shot him in 2010. Record producer Swizz Beatz compared working with Jay-Z and West to being in the studio with Quincy Jones and Michael Jackson at the same time. Swizz Beatz explained that despite the majority of people not feeling the same way, this comparison would be made in hip-hop history within 10 to 15 years. The producer recorded with Jay-Z and West during their sessions at The Mercer Hotel in SoHo, Manhattan for Watch the Throne in 2011. The rappers and Swizz Beatz co-wrote the song with S1 and Kid Cudi, while Indiggo's members Mihaela and Gabriela Modorcea were credited as songwriters as a result of the sample of their song "La La La". Due to a sample of "Celie Shaves Mr./Scarification" from the soundtrack to The Color Purple (1985), Jones, Harvey Mason, Jr., Joel Rosenbaum, Caiphus Semenya, and Bill Summers also received songwriting credits. Following the album's release, Semenya said that he was unaware of the sample until City Press reached out to him. He alleged that Jay-Z and West did not obtain permission, and he did not know which of his compositions with Jones had been used. Semenya was not favorable towards the rappers only crediting him, and felt that they should have obtained his permission first.

In 2011, S1 said that the song was part of his second batch of beats sent to West and during sessions for Watch the Throne in London, the rapper repeatedly played its beat. West recorded his verse after Jay-Z, who completed his recording in 10 to 15 minutes. Upon hearing the song's beat, West was impressed, saying: "What the heck is this?" Speaking to Revolt for the album's five-year anniversary in 2016, S1 recalled that "Murder to Excellence" originated from two separate songs. The first half was Swizz Beatz's song "Black on Black Murder" and S1's second half was titled "Black Excellence". West played these songs in the same order during a studio session and he suggested a merger after the collaborators enjoyed them, which was then completed by the engineer Noah Goldstein with a smooth transition from the first part into the next. The song names were also combined for the title of "Murder to Excellence", which is listed as having the two parts "Murder" and "Excellence" from Swizz Beatz and S1, respectively. Samples were incorporated by the producers, using these to blend both parts.

== Composition and lyrics ==
Musically, "Murder to Excellence" is a hip-hop song, with elements of experimental music. The song is a medley of the two parts "Murder" and "Excellence", featuring raw beats incorporating influences of rock music. "Murder to Excellence" features additional keys from Caleb McCampbell and for both parts, Jay-Z performs the first verse. The first part relies on a sample of Indiggo's refrain from "La La La". "Murder" includes bongo drums, dark piano, and strums of acoustic guitar. It features additional vocals from Kid Cudi, who contributes humming. Towards the end of the first part, the main drum beat fades out as sparse tribal drums take over.

For "Excellence", the song's beat speeds up as it incorporates a breakdown. The second part includes sped-up samples of "Celie Shaves Mr./Scarification" by Jones, which were seen by HotNewHipHop as a sample chop on "Murder". The sample is combined with piano chords for "Excellence", which are also part of the beat breakdown.

In the lyrics of the "Murder" portion, Jay-Z and West discuss black-on-black violence and police brutality without any questions. Jay-Z mentions the death of black power movement figure Fred Hampton on December 4, 1969, the same date the rapper was born and he references this by rapping that "real niggas just multiply". He also addresses black-on-black violence, calling it friendly fire from "the same team". West quotes a line of Jay-Z's 2003 track "Lucifer": "I'm from the murder capital, where they murder for capital." He follows this with a comparison between the 509 homicides in his hometown of Chicago and the 314 deaths of US soldiers in Iraq during 2008, referring to the city's nickname of Chiraq. Jay-Z and West celebrate their definitions of black excellence during "Excellence", including VIP clubs, boardrooms, and a high level of public influence. The former addresses reaching success through the American Dream and still not finding satisfaction, expressing not enough of his peers have the same race or similar life experiences as him. Jay-Z raps about seeing a small amount of fellow black people who have become successful, to which West responds by comparing them to "the promised land of the O.G.'s". He then depicts that past events like a black tie dress code would make blacks the last people expected to be recognized, focusing on the problems of the American social system.

== Release and reception ==
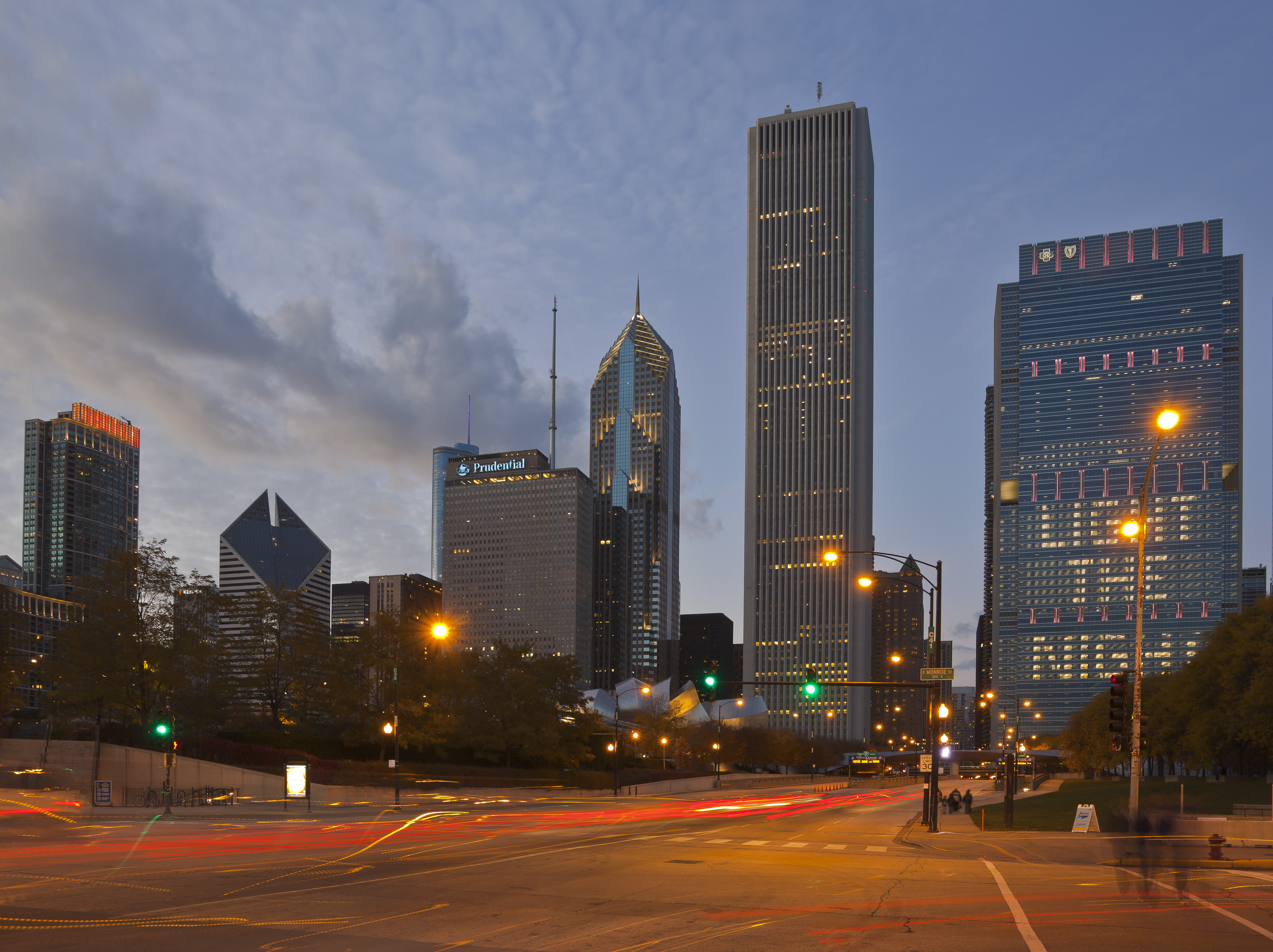
West makes a comparison between the 509 homicides in Chicago and the 314 deaths of US soldiers in Iraq that both occurred in 2008, which was a lyrical reference singled out by critics, who mostly preferred his performance to Jay-Z's.

On August 8, 2011, "Murder to Excellence" was included as the 10th track on Jay-Z and West's collaborative studio album Watch The Throne, released by their record labels Def Jam, Roc Nation, and Roc-A-Fella. During the two's Watch the Throne Tour that ran from 2011 until 2012, they performed the song. On June 8, 2022, it was used as the soundtrack of a trailer for the DC superhero film Black Adam. Similarly to the song's theme of suffering as black people and then escaping this, the film is based on Black Adam going from being a slave in Ancient Egypt before his death and returning as a dominant God with superpowers 5,000 years later.

"Murder to Excellence" was met with lukewarm reviews from music critics, with general praise for the subject matter of black violence. Tom Breihan of Pitchfork highlighted the discussions of black-on-black crime and "the scarcity of people of color at society's highest seats" for Jay-Z and West discussing something outside of "their bank accounts"; Beats Per Minute's Sean Highkin also lauded how the subject matter is not about themselves and the production invokes The College Dropout (2004). Writing for Time, Claire Suddath named the song as the album's prime example of Jay-Z and West touching on being successful black men as the latter compares Chicago to Iraq, while the former pays the tribute to Henry and he finalized that they chronicle "what's happening in urban communities". Julian Benbow from The Boston Globe believed that Jay-Z and West's chemistry excels through the song's two parts of Swizz Beatz's "concoction about cyclic black violence" and S1's production as they discuss "the narrowness of black success"; BBC Music reviewer Marcus J. Moore was also impressed with the tribal song's "glimpse into the urban homicide epidemic". Jesal 'Jay Soul' Padania from RapReviews similarly noted that "Murder" resembles S1's previous production work for West's 2010 single "Power" as he discusses "harsh realities", while he saw Jay-Z as adding a feeling of celebration with his calls on "Excellence". In HipHopDX, Edwin Ortiz expressed that the rappers offer "two contrasting sides of the African American narrative" across the separate parts. Rob Harvilla from Spin commended West's comparison of Chicago and Iraq, and the seriousness of Jay-Z's eulogy of Henry. He felt the subject matter on "Excellence" downgrades to fame and wealth along with the faster beat. James Shahan of Urb said that the song is a highlight of the album for the clear themes of black-on-black crime and their excellence, considering West to be more concise than Jay-Z. Shahan cited how West focuses on violence in Chicago and Iraq during "Murder", whereas Jay-Z goes from discussing Henry's death then later describes black power as "All black everything". MusicOMH's lauded the song's distinctive production and feels across its "sprawling landscapes", but thought that the rappers' references to each-others works fell into "frat boy backslapping territory".

In a mixed review, the Chicago Tribune writer Greg Kot commented that while Jay-Z and West address the problems of the African-American community on the song, "the two-part tale of destitution and dominance" devolves into becoming self-centered. At The Independent, Andy Gill offered that the two's discussion of black-on-black violence is underpinned by the dissonant guitar and "quirky girl-group refrain". For Paste, Ryan Reed found the "out-of-tune guitar" of "Murder" difficult to listen to. Calum Marsh of Cokemachineglow could not take the song's beat switch seriously, finding it too indulgent in self-pity. The Observer critic Kitty Empire considered the song to prove why Jay-Z and West showcase confidence of their achievements, questioning them delving into black violence and if there is any chance of "a fatherless drug dealer such as [Jay-Z] becoming king of the world". In Tiny Mix Tapes, Ross Green criticized the sequencing of the song next to "Made in America" on Watch the Throne for abandoning any foresight or purpose, providing "a convoluted and contradictory take on race relations" that prevails across the album.

Speaking at a screening for the University of Chicago in December 2011, Hampton's son Fred Hampton Jr., a political activist, expressed distaste with Jay-Z saying his father died, when he was actually assassinated. He thought this would be like the school teacher teaching students that "Christopher Columbus discovered America", dubbing Jay-Z as "Slave-Z". "Murder to Excellence" was nominated for Impact Track at the 2012 BET Hip Hop Awards, which it ultimately lost to "Daughters" by Nas.

== Credits and personnel ==
Credits are adapted from the album's liner notes.

Recording

- Recorded at Real World Studios (Wiltshire, UK) and (The Mercer) Hotel (New York)
- Mixed at (The Mercer) Hotel (New York)

Personnel

- Kanye West – songwriter
- Jay-Z – songwriter
- Swizz Beatz – songwriter, production
- S1 – songwriter, production
- Kid Cudi – songwriter, additional vocals
- Quincy Jones – songwriter
- Harvey Mason, Jr. – songwriter
- Joel Rosenbaum – songwriter
- Caiphus Semenya – songwriter
- Bill Summers – songwriter
- Mihaela Modorcea – songwriter
- Gabriela Modorcea – songwriter
- Noah Goldstein – recording engineer
- Mat Arnold – assistant recording engineer
- Anthony Kilhoffer – mix engineer
- Caleb McCampbell – additional keys
