= Akua Njeri =

American writer, activist (b. 1949/1950)

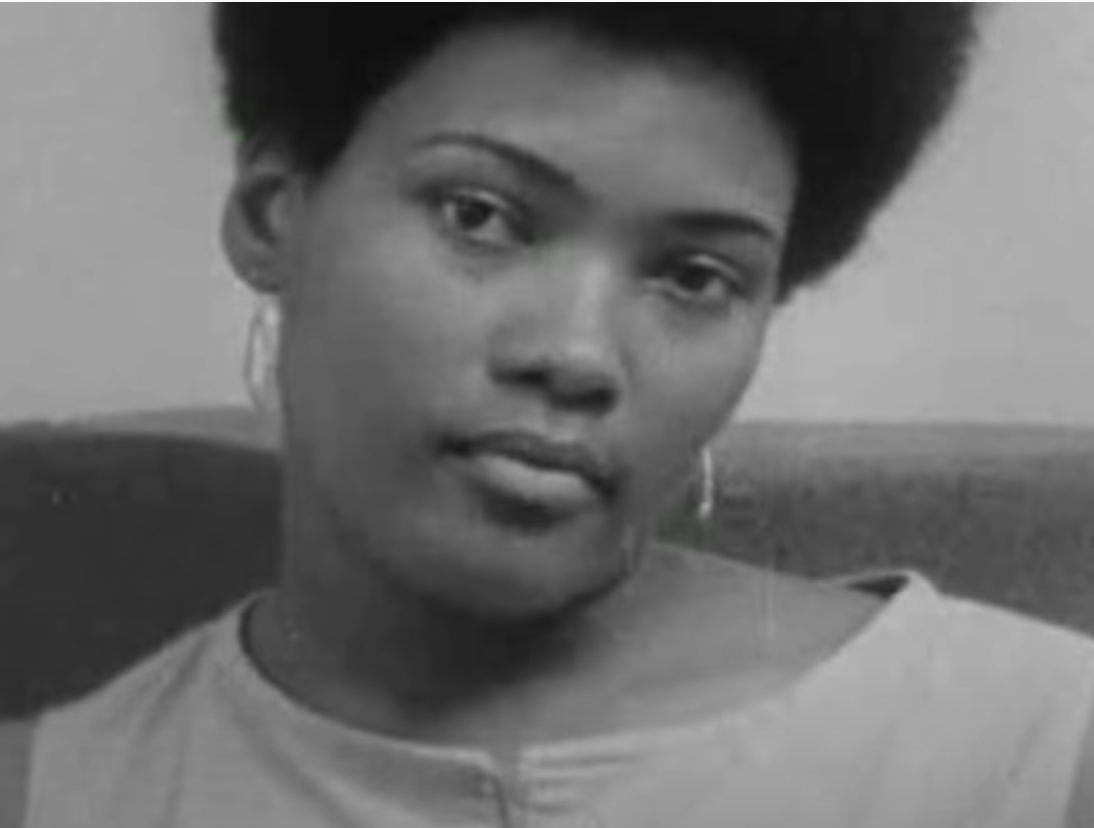
- Njeri c. 1970
- Born: Deborah Johnson; 1949 or 1950 (age 75–76); Chicago, Illinois, U.S.
- Education: Wilbur Wright College
- Occupation: Activist
- Known for: Civil rights activism in the United States; witnessing the assassination of her fiancé, Fred Hampton, and Mark Clark
- Political party: Black Panther
- Partner: Fred Hampton
- Children: Fred Hampton Jr.

Akua Njeri (formerly known as Deborah Johnson; born 1949/50) is an American writer, activist and former member of the Illinois Chapter of the Black Panther Party. Njeri was present at the December 4, 1969, police raid in which her fiancé, Fred Hampton, and Mark Clark were killed at the Chicago apartment she and Hampton shared. She is the mother of their son Fred Hampton Jr., born 25 days after his father's death.

== Early life ==
Njeri was born and grew up in Chicago, becoming a political activist at age 12. Throughout her teen years she participated in civil rights marches and protests against housing conditions in Chicago.

As a 17-year-old student at Wilbur Wright College, Njeri was a member of the Black Student Union that hosted speaker Fred Hampton, chairman of the Chicago chapter of the Black Panther Party. Njeri recalls that her first conversation with Hampton was about poetry. While she wrote her own poetry, Hampton said that he was interested only if the poetry was about "the struggles of the people and the people fighting back against the conditions of the Black community."

Njeri joined the Panthers soon after the Wright College event. She worked on their free breakfast program, the free medical clinic, and the free prison busing program for families of the incarcerated.

Njeri and Hampton soon became a couple, and in early 1969 Njeri became pregnant. She was 19 and he was 21.

== Death of Fred Hampton ==
Shortly after 4:00 am on December 4, 1969, the Chicago Police Department, carrying out a raid connected with the COINTELPRO project, stormed the apartment at 2337 West Monroe Street where Hampton, Njeri and several other Panther members slept.

Njeri was asleep beside Hampton when agents entered the apartment. She was 19 years old and more than eight months pregnant. Recounting the raid, she describes hearing the first shots near the front of the apartment and immediately attempting to shield Hampton with her body. When the shooting stopped, she stood up and began moving out of the bedroom. Police approached her and dragged her by the top of her head into the kitchen. She recalls a police voice saying "He's barely alive; he'll barely make it," before more shooting began. She heard "He's good and dead now." Njeri describes avoiding looking at Hampton's body so as to remain stoic. She was handcuffed and led by police from the apartment with a gun pressed to her pregnant belly.

Njeri and other survivors of the raid were arrested, charged with attempted murder and aggravated assault, and held on $100,000 bail.

== Aftermath ==
Public support enabled Njeri and the other survivors to eventually post the $100,000 bail. Njeri was the first survivor released due to her pregnancy and extreme stress. Hampton's son was born on December 29, 1969. Njeri first named him Alfred Johnson, but changed his name legally to Fred Hampton Jr when he was ten years old.

Njeri and the other survivors declined to participate in a federal grand jury investigation into the massacre. As Njeri explained, "they felt justice would not be served." She said that she has had lingering feelings of guilt because she survived the massacre in which Hampton died.

In May 1970, ballistics and forensics exonerated the Panthers who had been charged. Hampton and Clark's families and the survivors filed a civil case against the Chicago Police Department and the FBI. The litigation took 13 years. In 1983, the city of Chicago, Cook County, and the federal government agreed to pay a $1.8 million settlement to the seven survivors and to the families of the two victims. Each of the major players paid one-third of the settlement.

== Continued activism ==
Njeri began to read widely and identified increasingly with Africa. She changed her name to Akua Njeri as part of this transition, shedding what she called her "slave name", as did others in the Black Power and Nation of Islam movements.

In January 1990, Njeri attended the funeral of FBI informant William O'Neal, who had provided information to the FBI that aided the 1969 police raid on the Monroe Street apartment. He had committed suicide. She intended to "spit in the casket and then turn it over." She did not follow through.

In 1998 she was serving as national president of the National People's Democratic Uhuru Movement (NPDUM), an interracial organization dedicated to self-determination for African-Americans, and oversees the Chicago chapter. Their offices are on the South Side of the city. It is affiliated with the African People's Socialist Party.

In a 1998 interview, Fred Hampton Jr. said that his mother had discussed his father throughout his life. He "respected and loved" Hampton Sr. as a figure while not fully understanding the scope of his work and the reasons he was targeted by law enforcement. Hampton Jr. attested that "all through my life, my mother always taught me what my father did, the courageous stands he took."

Njeri is the chairperson of the December 4th Committee, which "fights to defend and maintain the legacy of the Black Panther Party and what really happened on that fateful morning [of Hampton and Clark's assassination]." The Committee coordinates with the Prisoners of Conscience Committee (POCC), whose advisory committee Njeri also serves on, to hold an annual celebration commemorating Hampton's birthday on August 30. The two organizations also collaborate to recognize International Revolutionary Day on the anniversary of the December 4th assassination of Hampton and Clark. Also with the POCC, Njeri helps coordinate clothing and food giveaways.

Njeri makes speaking appearances, and co-authored a proposal to name a Chicago block "Chairman Fred Hampton Way".

In 2019 Njeri and Fred Hampton Jr initiated a GoFundMe project, called “Save the Hampton House,” in order to acquire and restore Hampton Sr's childhood home in Maywood, Illinois. They intend to seek landmark status for the house and to adapt it as a museum. It would also be developed to offer education services, have community meeting space and gardens. By 2021 the campaign had raised more than $365,000, past their $350,000 goal.

== Media and popular culture ==
The 2021 American feature film Judas and the Black Messiah tells the story of Hampton's rise and fall, and William O'Neal's role as informant. Daniel Kaluuya and Lakeith Stanfield star in these roles, respectively. Njeri was portrayed by Dominique Fishback.

Both Njeri and Fred Hampton Jr. consulted with the production team on the film. Njeri advised Fishback on her portrayal. In a 2020 interview, Fishback recalled that Njeri was adamant that Fishback not cry during the assassination scene. She had not done so in 1969 and felt it was an important show of strength for the character and for Black women. Njeri was on set during the filming of the murder scene.

== Publications ==
- My Life with the Black Panther Party, Burning Spear Publications, 1991
- "My Dance with Justice", Yale Journal of Law and Liberation, 1991
