= Fred Hampton Jr. =

American political activist (born 1969)

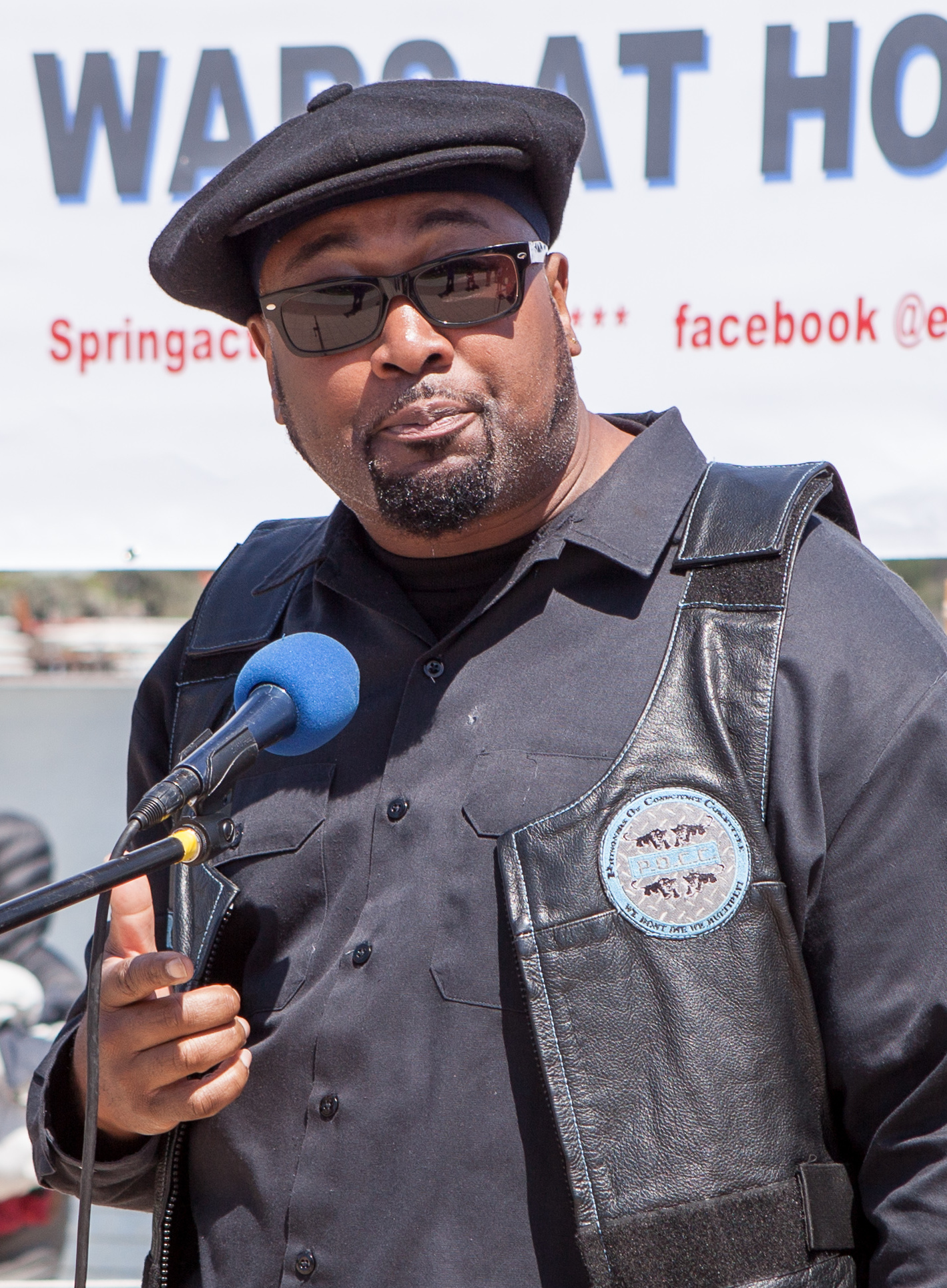
- Hampton Jr. speaking at a 2018 anti-war rally in Oakland
- Born: Fred Hampton Jr. December 29, 1969 (age 56); Chicago, Illinois, U.S.
- Occupation: Activist
- Years active: 1988–present
- Known for: Prisoners of Conscience Committee/Black Panther Party Cubs (Chairman)
- Parents: Fred Hampton (father); Akua Njeri (mother)

Fred Hampton Jr. (born December 29, 1969) is an American political activist, based in Chicago. He is the president and chairman of the Prisoners of Conscience Committee and Black Panther Cubs He is the only child of Fred Hampton (the Black Panther Party leader murdered by police in Chicago on December 4, 1969) with his fiancée, now known as Akua Njeri.

== Early life and education ==
Born in Chicago, Hampton is the son of Black Panther Party leader Fred Hampton and his fiancée, Deborah Johnson. He was born 25 days after his father's assassination by the Chicago police, at the age of 21, in a 1969 FBI instigated raid.

His mother named him Alfred Johnson at birth. When he was ten years old, she had his name legally changed to "Fred Hampton Jr." She had already changed her own name to Akua Njeri, as she increasingly had identified with Africa in the years after Hampton Sr's death.

Hampton graduated from Tilden High School and studied journalism at Olive–Harvey College.

== Career ==
During the late 1980s, Hampton worked part-time as an auto mechanic while speaking at rallies and working as an organizer for the National People's Democratic Uhuru Movement (NPDUM), an interracial group. He also sold The Burning Spear, the newspaper associated with the affiliated African Socialist Party.

He now serves as president and chairman of the Prisoners of Conscience Committee (POCC) and the Black Panther Party Cubs (BPPC), made up of descendants of Black Panthers. He continues to organize to bring people together across racial and class lines. He also is a spoken word artist and poet, and draws from his experiences with police and incarceration.

== Legal issues ==
During his early adulthood, Hampton was tried and acquitted on charges of armed robbery and murder. He and his supporters say that he was framed.

In 1993, he was convicted of aggravated arson. The case involved the 1992 firebombing of a Korean menswear store and a Korean jewelry store in Chicago on Halsted Street. No persons were injured. The arson occurred in 1992, during the 1992 Los Angeles riots, a six-day period of protests and outrage in many African-American communities after the acquittal of four Los Angeles Police Department (LAPD) officers who were charged with excessive force in the beating of African-American motorist Rodney King during an arrest. The incident had been videotaped and widely viewed in television broadcasts.

Hampton and his supporters maintain his innocence, claiming he was framed in both cases. During the trial, fire officials testified that the bottles that held the gasoline never broke, preventing more widescale damage. Photographs of his hands showed blisters that were evident when he was arrested.

Hampton was sentenced to eighteen years in prison. He was paroled on September 14, 2001.

== In popular culture ==
- Hampton appeared in Michel Gondry's 2006 film Dave Chappelle's Block Party.
- His 1993 trial is referred to in Fall Out Boy's song "You're Crashing, But You're No Wave".
- He and his father are mentioned in the song "Behind Enemy Lines" by Dead Prez, as well as "Clap for the Killers" by Street Sweeper Social Club.

Hampton and his mother both worked as consultants on the film Judas and the Black Messiah (2021), a biopic about his father co-written and directed by Shaka King. It stars Daniel Kaluuya as Hampton Sr. and LaKeith Stanfield as William O'Neal, a young FBI informant who infiltrated the Panthers. With nearly equal screen time in the film, both men were nominated for Academy Awards as Best Supporting Actor; Kaluuya won.
