= William O'Neal (informant) =

American FBI informant (1949–1990)

- O'Neal in 1973
- Born: April 9, 1949; Chicago, Illinois, U.S.
- Died: January 15, 1990 (aged 40); Chicago, Illinois, U.S.
- Cause of death: Suicide by running into freeway traffic
- Other name: William Hart
- Occupation: FBI informant/operative
- Years active: 1967–1970s
- Known for: Involvement in the killing of Fred Hampton
- Political party: Black Panther (as an infiltrator)

William O'Neal (April 9, 1949 – January 15, 1990) was an American Federal Bureau of Investigation (FBI) informant in Chicago, Illinois, where he infiltrated the local chapter of the Black Panther Party (BPP). He is known for being the catalyst for the 1969 police/FBI assassination of Fred Hampton, head of the Illinois BPP.

After his role was revealed in 1973, O'Neal was relocated to California under the Federal Witness Protection Program and given a new identity. In 1984, he secretly returned to Chicago. He was interviewed in 1989 about his informancy, for the second part of the documentary series Eyes on the Prize. On the night the first episode aired, January 15, 1990, O'Neal died by suicide. His own episode was broadcast on February 19, 1990.

== Biography ==
William O'Neal was born and grew up in Chicago, Illinois. In 1967, when he was about 18 years old, he was arrested by FBI agent Roy Martin Mitchell, who had tracked O'Neal down for stealing a car and driving it across state lines to Michigan.

In 1968 the FBI offered O'Neal a deal: in exchange for having his felony charges dropped and receiving a monthly stipend, O'Neal would infiltrate the Panthers as a counterintelligence operative (informant). The FBI had been conducting its illegal COINTELPRO operation since the mid-1950s, expanding their efforts against communists to include black civil rights activists. By 1966, it was attempting to infiltrate and undermine black nationalist movements, such as the Black Panthers, and discredit black civil rights leaders. The targeting of the Black Panther Party was heightened due to its adherence to Marxism-Leninism.

O'Neal soon aligned himself with Fred Hampton, who was 20 years old at the time. O'Neal was assigned as one of the heads of the Black Panther leader's security, and had keys to several Panther headquarters and safe houses.

In 1969 Hampton was working on the Rainbow Coalition, an alliance among gangs and minority groups in Chicago, and the FBI and police became increasingly concerned about his activities and growing political power. That summer, police raided Panther offices, arresting several members and burning the building down. The FBI acquired a drawing from O'Neal to show the layout of Hampton's apartment on Monroe Street in the West Side, where the Panthers often gathered, in order to prepare a raid.

On the evening of December 3, 1969, Hampton taught a political education class at a local church. Afterward, he and several Panthers went to his apartment, and ate a dinner prepared by O'Neal around midnight. O'Neal slipped secobarbitol into Hampton's drink so he would not wake up during the planned police raid. O'Neal left, and at about 1:30 a.m., Hampton fell asleep while talking to his mother on the telephone.

At 4:00 a.m., a 14-man armed Chicago Police team arrived at the apartment, and at 4:45 a.m. stormed inside. They first shot and killed Mark Clark, sitting in the front room of the apartment with a shotgun in his lap on security duty. The police cleared out the people from the rest of the apartment, wounding several others, and went to Hampton's bedroom. Witnesses said that they heard two bangs, presumably the close-range shots to the back of Hampton's head that killed him. In January 1970, a coroner's jury held an inquest. They ruled that the deaths of Hampton and Clark were justifiable homicide by the police. The ballistics investigation of the raid found that the Chicago police fired as many as 99 shots, but only one shot was fired by the Panthers, and it hit the ceiling.

=== Later life ===
O'Neal's involvement in the raid was revealed in 1973, and he was relocated to California under the alias of William Hart via the Federal Witness Protection Program. He secretly returned to Chicago in 1984.

External videos
- "Eyes on the Prize; Interview with William O'Neal" conducted by Blackside for Eyes on the Prize II. O'Neal discusses being recruited to be an informant for the FBI in Chicago, joining the Black Panthers, and giving the FBI information about the Black Panthers' activities and Fred Hampton.

On April 13, 1989, O'Neal was interviewed for the PBS documentary Eyes on the Prize II, about the civil rights movement in the 1960s. In the extensive interview, he described being recruited by the FBI to become an informant and provide information about Fred Hampton, chairman of the Chicago Black Panther Party. He gave details about his impressions and experiences working in the Black Panther Party, his relationship with FBI agent Roy Mitchell, and his feelings about his activities and his role. He denied having drugged Hampton the night before he was assassinated. O'Neal said, "I had no allegiance to the Panthers."

In the early hours of January 15, 1990, after visiting with his uncle Ben Heard, O'Neal ran out of the apartment and into traffic on Interstate 290, where he was hit by a car, and killed; he was 40 years old. His death was ruled a suicide, though his wife said that it was accidental. Earlier in the evening, O'Neal had been drinking and attempted to jump out of a second-story window, but Heard pulled him back inside. Heard said afterward that O'Neal had "cooperated with the FBI to reduce his own potential jail time, then got in way over his head and was forever tortured by the guilt", and that "he never thought it would come to all this." He said O'Neal had previously run out onto Interstate 290 in September 1989 and that he was hit by a vehicle and hospitalized.

The episode featuring O'Neal's interview, "A Nation of Law? (1968–71)", was broadcast on February 19, 1990.

== In popular culture ==
O'Neal and his betrayal of Hampton are explored in the film Judas and the Black Messiah (2021), where he is portrayed by LaKeith Stanfield. For their performances, both Stanfield and Daniel Kaluuya (who played Hampton) were nominated for the Academy Award for Best Supporting Actor, which Kaluuya won.
