= Fred Hampton =

African-American activist (1948–1969)

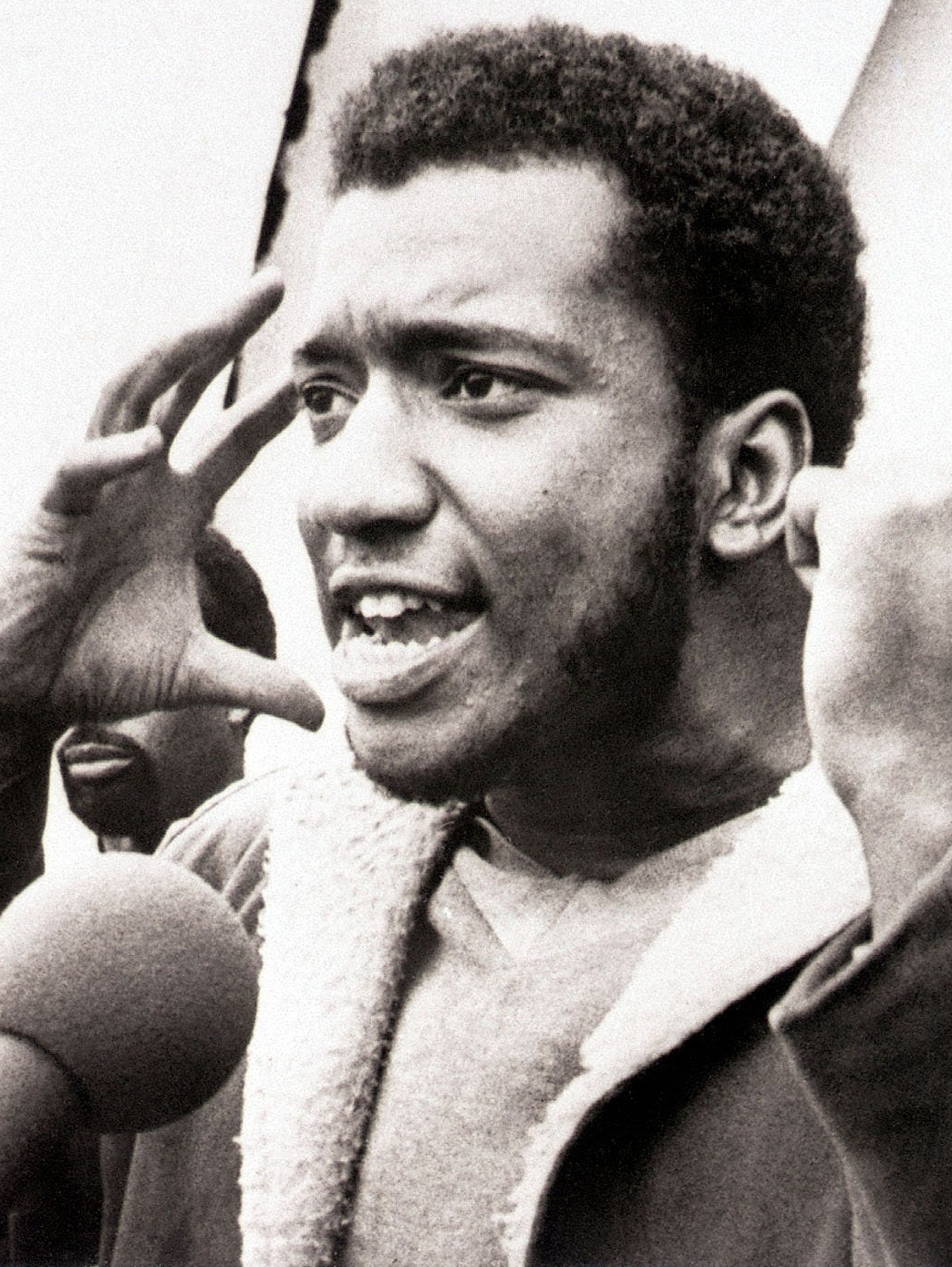
- Hampton speaking at a rally in Grant Park, Chicago, September 1969
- Born: Fredrick Allen Hampton; August 30, 1948; Chicago, Illinois, U.S.
- Died: December 4, 1969 (aged 21); Chicago, Illinois, U.S.
- Cause of death: Assassination (gunshot wounds)
- Resting place: Bethel Cemetery; Haynesville, Louisiana, U.S.
- Other name: Chairman Fred
- Education: Triton College
- Occupations: Activist, revolutionary
- Years active: 1966–1969
- Office: Chairman of the Illinois chapter of the Black Panther Party
- Political party: Black Panther
- Partner: Akua Njeri
- Children: Fred Hampton Jr.

Fredrick Allen Hampton Sr. (August 30, 1948 – December 4, 1969) was an African American revolutionary and political activist who served as deputy chairman of the Black Panther Party, a Marxist–Leninist and black power political and militant organization from 1966 until his assassination in 1969. He was also chair of the Illinois chapter and founded the anti-racist, anti-classist Rainbow Coalition, a prominent multicultural political organization that combined Black Panthers, Young Patriots, and the Young Lords, which were all leftist political organizations that included African Americans, White Southerners, and Puerto Ricans. Hampton also formed an alliance among major Chicago street gangs to help them end infighting and work for social change. Hampton began his activism in the National Association for the Advancement of Colored People (NAACP), serving as the Youth Council President of the West Suburban branch in the Chicago area.

In 1967, the Federal Bureau of Investigation (FBI) identified Hampton as a radical threat. It tried to subvert his activities in Chicago, sowing disinformation among black progressive groups and placing a counterintelligence operative in the local Panthers organization. In December 1969, Hampton was drugged, then shot and killed in his bed during a predawn raid at his Chicago apartment by a tactical unit of the Cook County State's Attorney's Office, who received aid from the Chicago Police Department and the FBI leading up to the attack. Law enforcement sprayed more than 100 gunshots throughout the apartment; the occupants fired once. During the raid, Panther Mark Clark was also killed and several others were seriously wounded. In January 1970, the Cook County Coroner held an inquest; the coroner's jury concluded that Hampton's and Clark's deaths were justifiable homicides.

A civil lawsuit for wrongful death was later filed on behalf of the survivors and the relatives of Hampton and Clark. It was resolved in 1982 by a settlement of $1.85 million (equivalent to $6.17 million in 2025); the U.S. federal government, Cook County, and the City of Chicago each paid one-third to a group of nine plaintiffs. Given revelations about the COINTELPRO program and documents associated with the killings, many scholars now consider Hampton's murder, at age 21, a deliberate assassination at the FBI's initiative.

== Biography ==
=== Early life and youth ===
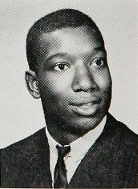
Hampton in a 1966 yearbook

Fredrick Allen Hampton was born on August 30, 1948, in present-day Summit Argo, Illinois (generally shortened to Summit), and moved with his parents to another Chicago suburb, Maywood, at age 10. His parents had come from Louisiana as part of the Great Migration of African Americans in the early 20th century out of the South. They both worked at the Argo Starch Company, a corn starch processor. As a youth, Hampton was gifted both in the classroom and athletically, and hoped to play center field for the New York Yankees. At 10 years old, he started hosting weekend breakfasts for other children from the neighborhood, cooking the meals himself in what could be described as a precursor to the Panthers' free breakfast program. In high school, he led walkouts protesting black students' exclusion from the competition for homecoming queen and calling on officials to hire more black teachers and administrators. Hampton graduated from Proviso East High School with honors and varsity letters, and a Junior Achievement Award, in 1966.

In 1966, Fred Hampton turned 18. At that time, he started identifying with the Third World socialist struggles, as well as reading communist revolutionaries Che Guevara, Ho Chi Minh, and Mao Zedong. Shortly after, Hampton urged not only peace in the Vietnam War, but also North Vietnam's victory.

Hampton became active in the National Association for the Advancement of Colored People (NAACP) and assumed leadership of its West Suburban Branch's Youth Council. In his capacity as an NAACP youth organizer, he demonstrated leadership abilities: from a community of 27,000, he was able to muster a youth group of 500 members strong. He worked to get more and better recreational facilities established in the neighborhoods and to improve educational resources for Maywood's impoverished black community.

=== Activity in Chicago ===
We got to face some facts. That the masses are poor, that the masses belong to what you call the lower class, and when I talk about the masses, I'm talking about the white masses, I'm talking about the black masses, and the brown masses, and the yellow masses, too. We've got to face the fact that some people say you fight fire best with fire, but we say you put fire out best with water. We say you don't fight racism with racism. We're gonna fight racism with solidarity. We say you don't fight capitalism with no black capitalism; you fight capitalism with socialism.

— Fred Hampton on solidarity.

In 1968, Hampton was accused of assaulting an ice cream truck driver, stealing $71 worth of ice cream bars, and giving them to children in the street. He was convicted in May 1969 and served time in prison. In a memoir, Frank B. Wilderson III places this incident in the context of COINTELPRO efforts to disrupt the Black Panthers of Chicago by the "leveling of trumped-up charges".

In 1969, Hampton, now deputy chairman of the BPP Illinois chapter, conducted a meeting condemning sexism. After 1969, the party officially considered sexism "counter-revolutionary". In 1970, about 40–70% of party members were women.

Over the next year, Hampton and his friends and associates achieved many successes in Chicago. Perhaps the most important was a nonaggression pact among Chicago's most powerful street gangs. Emphasizing that racial and ethnic conflict among gangs would only keep its members entrenched in poverty, Hampton strove to forge an anti-racist, class-conscious, multiracial alliance among the BPP, the Young Patriots Organization, and the Young Lords under the leadership of Jose Cha Cha Jimenez, leading to the Rainbow Coalition.

Hampton met the Young Lords in Chicago's Lincoln Park neighborhood the day after they were in the news for occupying a police community workshop at the Chicago 18th District Police Station. He was arrested twice with Jimenez at the Wicker Park Welfare Office, and both were charged with "mob action" at a peaceful picket of the office. Later, the Rainbow Coalition was joined nationwide by Students for a Democratic Society (SDS), the Brown Berets, AIM, and the Red Guard Party. In May 1969, Hampton called a press conference to announce that the coalition had formed. What the coalition groups would do was based on common action. Some of their joint issues were poverty, racism, corruption, police brutality, and substandard housing. If there was a protest or a demonstration, the groups would attend the event and support each other.

Jeffrey Haas, who was Hampton's lawyer, has praised some of Hampton's politics and his success in unifying movements, though Haas later was critical that Hampton and the BPP organized in a 'pyramidal' or 'vertical' structure, contrasting this with the more horizontal structure of the later Black Lives Matter at the time: "They may also have picked up on the vulnerability of a hierarchical movement where you have one leader, which makes the movement very vulnerable if that leader is imprisoned, killed, or otherwise compromised. I think the fact that Black Lives Matter says 'We're leaderfull, not leaderless' perhaps makes them less vulnerable to this kind of government assault."

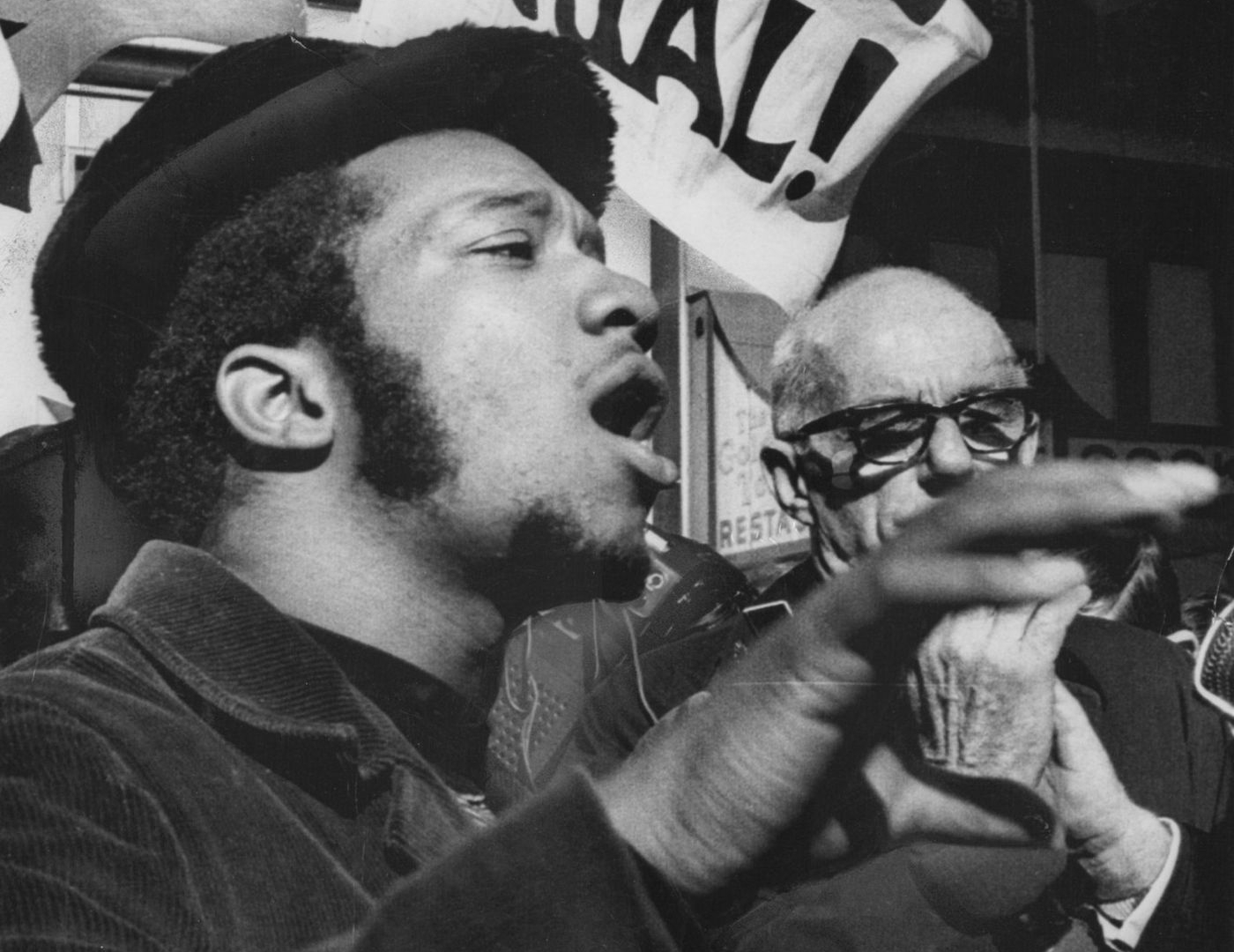
Hampton and Benjamin Spock (right) at a protest rally outside the Everett McKinley Dirksen U.S. Courthouse in Chicago, October 1969

Hampton rose quickly in the Black Panthers based on his organizing skills, oratorical gifts, and charisma. Once he became leader of the Chicago chapter, he organized weekly rallies, participated in strikes, worked closely with the BPP's local People's Clinic, taught political education classes every morning at 6 am, and launched a project for community supervision of the police. Hampton was also instrumental in the BPP's Free Breakfast Program. When Bob Brown left the party with Kwame Ture, in the FBI-fomented SNCC/Panther split, Hampton assumed chairmanship of the Illinois state BPP. This automatically made him a national BPP deputy chairman. As the FBI's COINTELPRO began to decimate the nationwide Panther leadership, Hampton's prominence in the national hierarchy increased rapidly and dramatically. Eventually, he was in line to be appointed to the party's Central Committee Chief of Staff. He would have achieved this position had he not been killed.

=== FBI investigation ===
The FBI believed that Hampton's leadership and talent for communication made him a major threat among Black Panther leaders. It began keeping close tabs on his activities. Investigations have shown that FBI Director J. Edgar Hoover was determined to prevent the formation of a cohesive Black movement in the United States. Hoover believed the Panthers, Young Patriots, Young Lords, and similar radical coalitions that Hampton forged in Chicago were a stepping stone to the rise of a revolution that could cause a radical change in the U.S. government.

The FBI opened a file on Hampton in 1967. It tapped Hampton's mother's phone in February 1968 and by May placed Hampton on the bureau's "Agitator Index" as a "key militant leader". In late 1968, the Racial Matters squad of the FBI's Chicago field office recruited William O'Neal to work with it; he had recently been arrested twice for interstate car theft and impersonating a federal officer. In exchange for having his felony charges dropped and receiving a monthly stipend, O'Neal agreed to infiltrate the BPP as a counterintelligence operative.

O'Neal joined the party and quickly rose in the organization, becoming Director of Chapter Security and Hampton's bodyguard. In 1969, the FBI Special Agent in Charge (SAC) in San Francisco wrote Hoover that the agent's investigation had found that, in his city at least, the Panthers were primarily feeding breakfast to children. Hoover responded with a memo implying that the agent's career prospects depended on his supplying evidence to support Hoover's view that the BPP was "a violence-prone organization seeking to overthrow the Government by revolutionary means".

Using anonymous letters, the FBI sowed distrust and eventually instigated a split between the Panthers and the Blackstone Rangers. O'Neal instigated an armed clash between them on April 2, 1969. The Panthers became effectively isolated from their power base in the Chicago ghetto, so the FBI worked to undermine its ties with other radical organizations. O'Neal was instructed to "create a rift" between the party and Students for a Democratic Society, whose Chicago headquarters was near that of the Panthers.

The FBI released a batch of racist cartoons in the Panthers' name, aimed at alienating white activists. It also launched a disinformation program to forestall the formation of the Rainbow Coalition, but the BPP did make an alliance with the Young Patriots and Young Lords. In repeated directives, Hoover demanded that COINTELPRO personnel investigate the Rainbow Coalition, "destroy what the [BPP] stands for", and "eradicate its 'serve the people' programs".

Documents secured by Senate investigators in the early 1970s revealed that the FBI actively encouraged violence between the Panthers and other radical groups; this provoked multiple murders in cities throughout the country. On July 16, 1969, an armed confrontation between party members and the Chicago Police Department resulted in one BPP member being mortally wounded, and six others arrested on serious charges.

In early October, Hampton and his girlfriend Deborah Johnson (now known as Akua Njeri), who was pregnant with their child (Fred Hampton Jr.), rented a four-and-a-half-room apartment at 2337 West Monroe Street to be closer to BPP headquarters. O'Neal reported to his superiors that much of the Panthers' "provocative" arms stockpile was stored there. He drew them a map of the apartment. In early November, Hampton traveled to California on a speaking engagement with the UCLA Law Students Association. He met with the remaining BPP national hierarchy, who appointed him to the party's central committee. He was soon to take the position of chief of staff and major spokesman.

== Assassination and funeral ==
=== Prelude ===
On the night of November 13, 1969, while Hampton was in California, Chicago police officers John J. Gilhooly and Frank G. Rappaport were killed in a gun battle with Panthers; one died the next day. A total of nine police officers were shot. Spurgeon Winter Jr, a 19-year-old Panther, was killed by police. Another Panther, Lawrence S. Bell, was charged with murder. In an unsigned editorial headlined "No Quarter for Wild Beasts", the Chicago Tribune urged that Chicago police officers approaching suspected Panthers "should be ordered to be ready to shoot."

As part of the larger COINTELPRO operation, the FBI was determined to prevent any improvement in the effectiveness of the BPP leadership. The FBI orchestrated an armed raid with the Chicago police and Cook County State's Attorney on Hampton's Chicago apartment. They had obtained detailed information about the apartment, including a layout of furniture, from O'Neal. An augmented, 14-man team of the SAO (state Special Prosecutions Unit) was organized for a predawn raid; they were armed with a search warrant for illegal weapons.

On the evening of December 3, Hampton taught a political education course at a local church, which was attended by most Panther members. Afterward, as was typical, he was accompanied to his Monroe Street apartment by Johnson and several Panthers: Blair Anderson, James Grady, Ronald "Doc" Satchell, Harold Bell, Verlina Brewer, Louis Truelock, Brenda Harris and Mark Clark. O'Neal was already there, having prepared a late dinner, which the group ate around midnight. O'Neal had slipped the secobarbital into a drink that Hampton consumed during the dinner to sedate Hampton so he would not awaken during the subsequent raid. O'Neal left after dinner. At about 1:30 a.m., December 4, Hampton fell asleep mid-sentence while talking to his mother on the telephone.

Although Hampton was not known to take drugs, Cook County chemist Eleanor Berman later reported that she had run two tests, each showing evidence of barbiturates in Hampton's blood. An FBI chemist failed to find similar traces, but Berman stood by her findings.

=== Raid ===
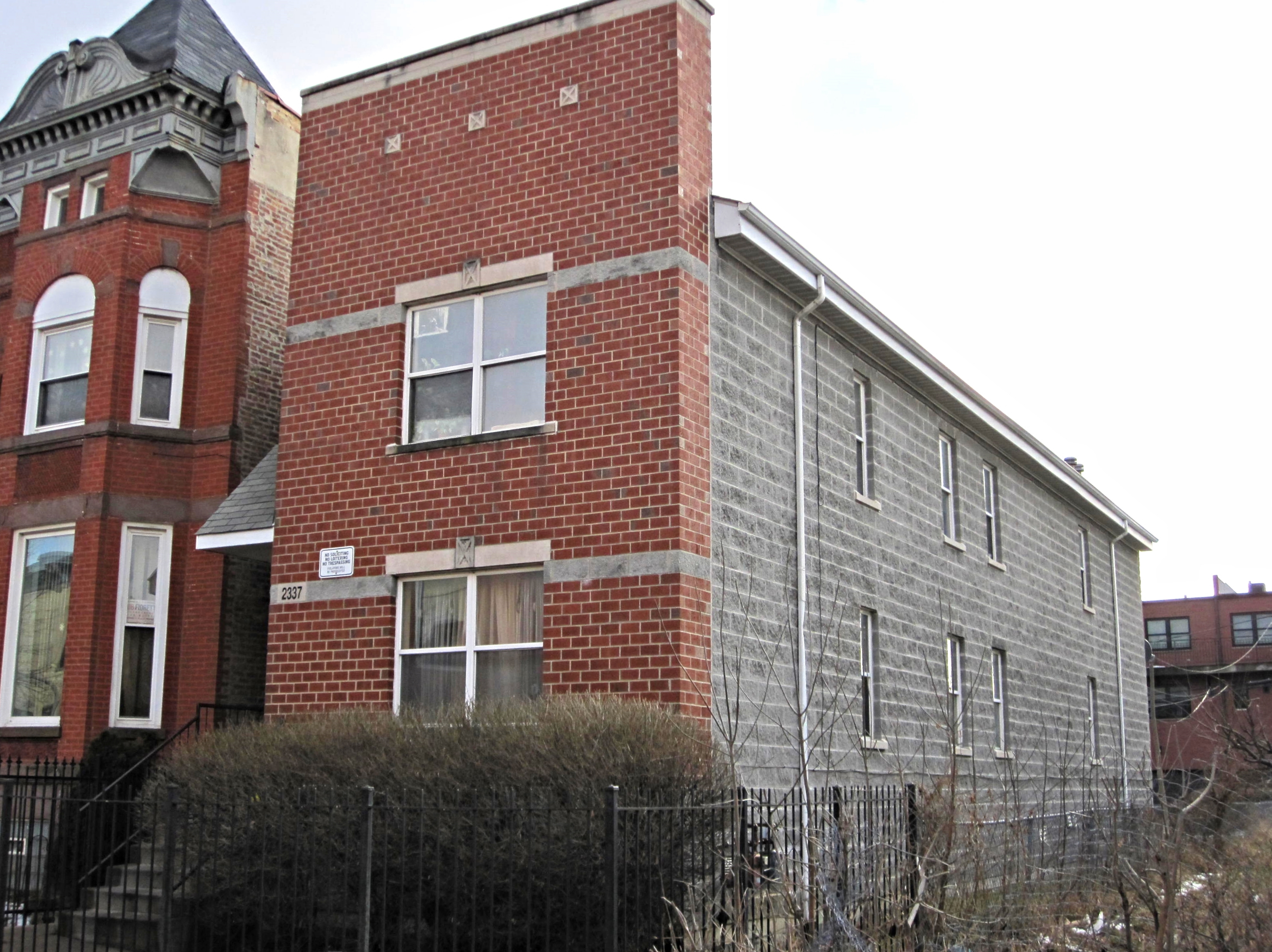
Site of Black Panther Party Raid, Fred Hampton's Death

The bed and room where Hampton was fatally shot during the raid, showing a large amount of blood on his side of the mattress and numerous bullet holes in the walls

The office of Cook County State's Attorney Edward Hanrahan organized the raid, using officers attached to his office. Hampton had recently strongly criticized Hanrahan, saying that Hanrahan's talk about a "war on gangs" was really rhetoric used to enable him to carry out a "war on black youth".

At 4 a.m., the heavily armed police team arrived at the site, divided into two teams, eight for the front of the building and six for the rear. At 4:45 a.m., they stormed the apartment. Mark Clark (22), sitting in the front room of the apartment with a shotgun in his lap, was on security duty. The police shot him in the chest, killing him instantly. An alternative account said that Clark answered the door and police immediately shot him. Either way, Clark's gun discharged once into the ceiling. This single round was fired when he suffered a reflexive death-convulsion after being shot. This was the only shot fired by the Panthers.

Fred Hampton, drugged by barbiturates, was sleeping on a mattress in the bedroom with Deborah Johnson (18) who was eight and a half months pregnant with their child. Police officers removed her from the room while Hampton lay unconscious in bed. Then the raiding team fired at the head of the south bedroom. Hampton was wounded in the shoulder by the shooting. According to the National Archives and Records Administration, "upon that discovery, an officer shot him twice in his head and killed him."

Fellow Black Panther Harold Bell said that he heard the following exchange:

"That's Fred Hampton."

"Is he dead?... Bring him out."

"He's barely alive."

"He'll make it."

The injured Panthers said they heard two shots. According to Hampton's supporters, the shots were fired point-blank at Hampton's head. According to Johnson, an officer then said: "He's good and dead now."

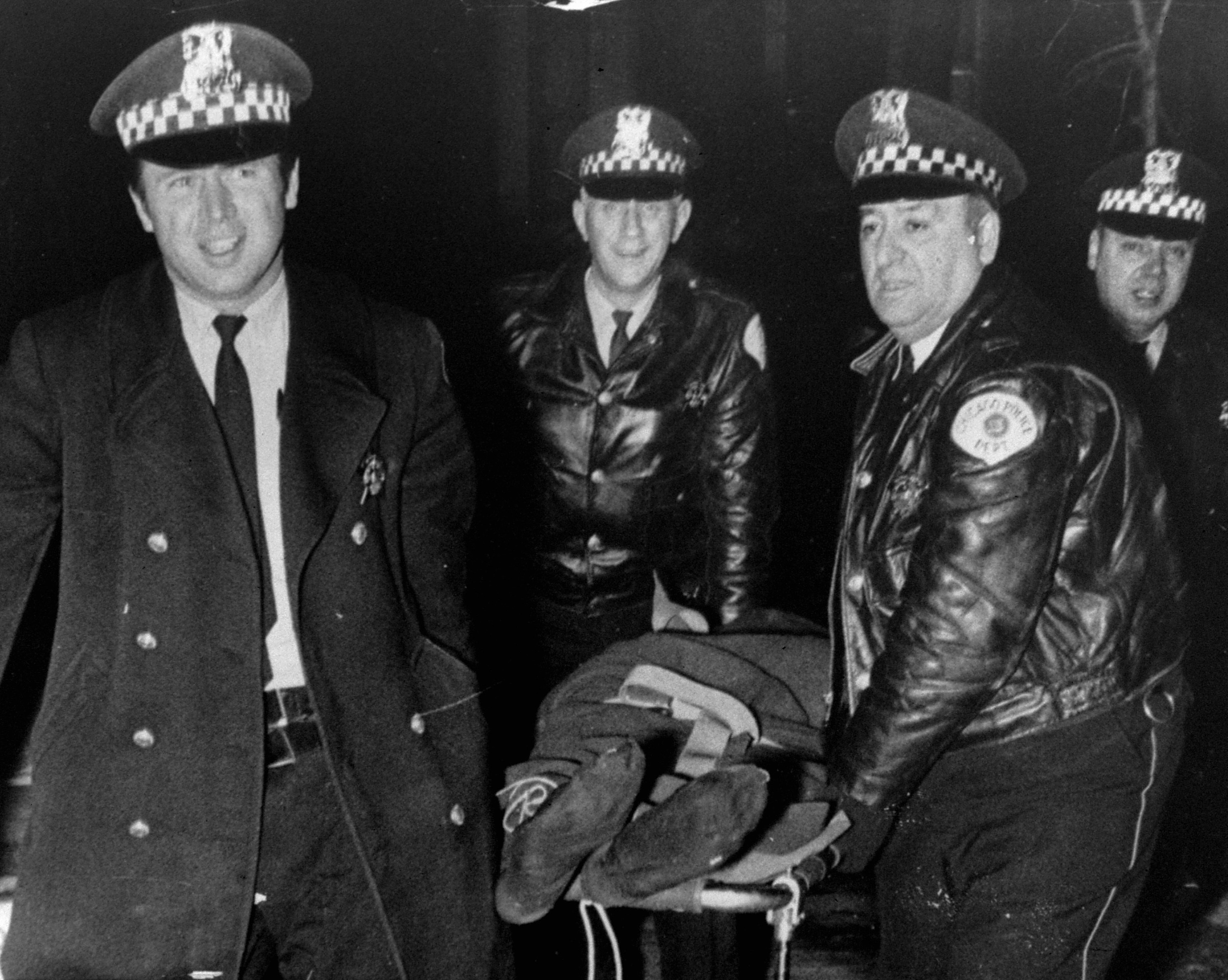
Chicago police removing Hampton's body

Hampton's body was dragged into the bedroom doorway and left in a pool of blood. The officers directed their gunfire at the remaining Panthers who had been sleeping in the north bedroom. This included Ronald "Doc" Satchel (18), Blair Anderson (18), Verlina Brewer (17), and Brenda Harris (19). Brewer, Satchel, Anderson, and Harris were seriously wounded, then beaten and dragged into the street. They were arrested on charges of aggravated assault and attempted murder of the officers. They were each held on $100,000 bail.

In the early 1990s, Jose "Cha Cha" Jimenez, founder of the Young Lords, a Puerto Rican separatist street gang, who had developed close ties to Hampton and the Chicago Black Panther Party during the late 1960s, interviewed Johnson about the raid. She said:

I believe Fred Hampton was drugged. The reason why is because when he woke up when the person [Truelock] said, "Chairman, chairman," he was shaking Fred's arm, you know, Fred's arm was folded across the head of the bed. And Fred—he just raised his head up real slow. It was like watching a slow motion. He raised. His eyes were open. He raised his head up real slow, you know, with his eyes toward the entranceway, toward the bedroom and laid his head back down. That was the only movement he made [...]

The seven Panthers who survived the raid were indicted by a grand jury on charges of attempted murder, armed violence, and other weapons charges. These charges were subsequently dropped. During the trial, the Chicago Police Department claimed that the Panthers were the first to fire shots, but a later investigation found that the Chicago police fired between 90 and 99 shots, while the only Panthers shot was from Clark's dropped shotgun.

After the raid, the apartment was left unguarded. The Panthers sent some members to investigate, accompanied by videographer Mike Gray and stills photographer Norris McNamara to document the scene. The footage was later released as part of the 1971 documentary The Murder of Fred Hampton. After a break-in at an FBI office in Pennsylvania, the existence of COINTELPRO, an illegal counter-intelligence program, was revealed and reported. With this program revealed, many activists and others began to suspect that the police raid and Hampton's killing were conducted under this program. One of the documents released after the break-in was a floor plan of Hampton's apartment. Another document outlined a deal that the FBI brokered with U.S. deputy attorney general Richard Kleindienst to conceal the FBI's role in Hampton's death and the existence of COINTELPRO.

=== Aftermath ===
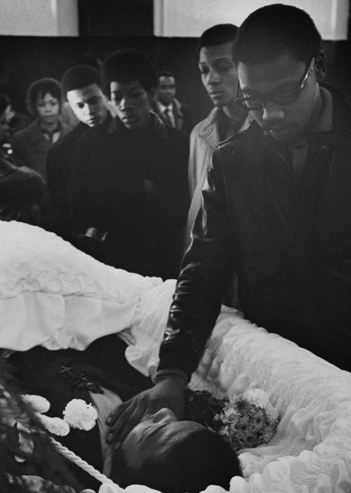
Mourners passing the bier of Hampton. His funeral in December was attended by over 5,000 people.

At a press conference the next day, the police announced the arrest team had been attacked by the "violent" and "extremely vicious" Panthers and defended themselves accordingly. In a second press conference on December 8, the police leadership praised the assault team for their "remarkable restraint", "bravery", and "professional discipline" in not killing all the Panthers present. Photographic evidence was presented of "bullet holes" allegedly made by shots fired by the Panthers, but reporters soon challenged this claim. An internal investigation was undertaken, and the police claimed that their colleagues on the assault team were exonerated of any wrongdoing, concluding that they "used lawful means to overcome the assault."

Five thousand people attended Hampton's funeral. He was eulogized by black leaders, including Jesse Jackson and Ralph Abernathy, Martin Luther King Jr.'s successor as head of the Southern Christian Leadership Conference. In his eulogy, Jackson said that "when Fred was shot in Chicago, black people in particular, and decent people in general, bled everywhere." On December 6, members of the Weather Underground destroyed numerous police vehicles in a retaliatory bombing spree at 3600 N. Halsted Street, Chicago.

The police called their raid on Hampton's apartment a "shootout". The Black Panthers called it a "shoot-in", because so many shots were fired by police.

On December 11 and 12, the two competing daily newspapers, the Chicago Tribune and the Chicago Sun-Times, published vivid accounts of the events but drew different conclusions. The Tribune has long been considered the politically conservative newspaper, and the Sun-Times the liberal paper. On December 11, the Tribune published a page 1 article titled, "Exclusive – Hanrahan, Police Tell Panther Story". The article included photographs supplied by Hanrahan's office that depicted bullet holes in a thin white curtain and door jamb as evidence that the Panthers fired multiple bullets at the police.

Jack Challem, editor of the Wright College News, the student newspaper at Wright Junior College in Chicago, had visited the apartment on December 6, when it was still unsecured. He took numerous photographs of the crime scenes. A member of the Black Panthers was allowing visitors to tour the apartment. Challem's photographs did not show the bullet holes reported by the Tribune. On the morning of December 12, after the Tribune article had appeared with the Hanrahan-supplied photos, Challem contacted a reporter at the Sun-Times, showed him his own photographs, and encouraged the other reporter to visit the apartment. That evening, the Sun-Times published a page 1 article with the headline: "Those 'bullet holes' aren't." According to the article, the alleged bullet holes (supposedly the result of the Panthers shooting in the direction of the police) were nail heads.

Four weeks after witnessing Hampton's death at the hands of the police, Johnson gave birth to their son, Fred Hampton Jr.

Civil rights activists Roy Wilkins and Ramsey Clark, styled as "The Commission of Inquiry into the Black Panthers and the Police", alleged that the Chicago police had killed Hampton without justification or provocation and had violated the Panthers' constitutional rights against unreasonable search and seizure. "The Commission" further alleged that the Chicago Police Department had imposed a summary punishment on the Panthers.

A federal grand jury did not return any indictment against any of the individuals involved with the planning or execution of the raid, including the officers involved in killing Hampton. O'Neal, who had given the FBI the floor plan of the apartment and drugged Hampton, later admitted his involvement in setting up the raid. He committed suicide on January 15, 1990.

=== Inquest ===
Shortly after the raid, Cook County Coroner Andrew Toman began forming a special six-member coroner's jury to hold an inquest into the deaths of Hampton and Clark. On December 23, Toman announced four additions to the jury, who included two African-American men: physician Theodore K. Lawless and attorney Julian B. Wilkins, the son of J. Ernest Wilkins Sr. He said the four were selected from a group of candidates submitted to his office by groups and individuals representing both Chicago's black and white communities. Civil rights leaders and spokesmen for the black community were reportedly disappointed with the selection.

An official with the Chicago Urban League said, "I would have had more confidence in the jury if one of them had been a black man who has a rapport with the young and the grass roots in the community." Gus Savage said that such a man to whom the community could relate need not be black. The jury eventually included a third black man, who had been a member of the first coroner's jury sworn in on December 4.

The blue-ribbon panel convened for the inquest on January 6, 1970. On January 21, they ruled the deaths of Hampton and Clark to be justifiable homicides. The jury qualified their verdict on Hampton's death as "based solely and exclusively on the evidence presented to this inquisition"; police and expert witnesses provided the only testimony during the inquest.

Jury foreman James T. Hicks stated that they could not consider the charges made by surviving Black Panthers who had been in the apartment; they had told reporters that the police had entered the apartment shooting. The survivors were reported to have refused to testify during the inquest because they faced criminal charges of attempted murder and aggravated assault during the raid. Attorneys for the Hampton and Clark families did not introduce any witnesses during the proceedings but called the inquest "a well-rehearsed theatrical performance designed to vindicate the police officers". Hanrahan said the verdict was recognition "of the truthfulness of our police officers' account of the events".

=== Federal grand jury ===
Released on May 15, 1970, the reports of a federal grand jury criticized the actions of the police, the surviving Black Panthers, and the Chicago news media. The grand jury called the police department's raid "ill conceived" and said many errors were committed during the post-raid investigation and reconstruction of the events. It said that the surviving Black Panthers' refusal to cooperate hampered the investigation, and that the press "improperly and grossly exaggerated stories".

=== 1970 civil rights lawsuit ===
In 1970, the survivors and relatives of Hampton and Clark filed a civil suit, stating that the civil rights of the Black Panther members were violated by the joint police/FBI raid and seeking $47.7 million in damages. Twenty-eight defendants were named, including Hanrahan as well as the City of Chicago, Cook County, and federal governments. It took years for the case to get to trial, which lasted 18 months. It was reported to have been the longest federal trial up to that time. After its conclusion in 1977, Judge Joseph Sam Perry of the United States District Court for the Northern District of Illinois dismissed the suit against 21 of the defendants before jury deliberations. After jurors deadlocked on a verdict, Perry dismissed the suit against the remaining defendants.

The plaintiffs appealed. In 1979, the United States Court of Appeals for the Seventh Circuit in Chicago found that the government had withheld relevant documents, thereby obstructing the judicial process. Reinstating the case against 24 of the defendants, the Court of Appeals ordered a new trial. The Supreme Court of the United States heard an appeal by defendants but voted 5–3 in 1980 to remand the case to the District Court for a new trial.

In 1982, the City of Chicago, Cook County, and the federal government agreed to a settlement in which each would pay $616,333 (equivalent to $2.06 million per payee in 2025) to a group of nine plaintiffs, including the mothers of Hampton and Clark. The $1.85 million settlement (equivalent to $6.17 million in 2025) was believed to be the largest ever in a civil rights case. G. Flint Taylor, one of the attorneys representing the plaintiffs, said, "The settlement is an admission of the conspiracy that existed between the FBI and Hanrahan's men to murder Fred Hampton." Assistant United States Attorney Robert Gruenberg said the settlement was intended to avoid another costly trial and was not an admission of guilt or responsibility by any of the defendants.

=== Controversy ===
Ten days after Hampton was killed, Bobby Rush, the then deputy minister of defense for the Illinois Black Panther Party, called the raiding party an "execution squad". As is typical in settlements, the three government defendants did not acknowledge claims of responsibility for plaintiffs' allegations.

Michael Newton is among the writers who have concluded that Hampton was assassinated. In his 2016 book Unsolved Civil Rights Murder Cases, 1934–1970, Newton writes that Hampton "was murdered in his sleep by Chicago police with FBI collusion." This view is also presented in Jakobi Williams's book From the Bullet to the Ballot: The Illinois Chapter of the Black Panther Party and Racial Coalition Politics in Chicago.

== Personal life ==
Hampton was very close to Chicago Black Catholic priest George Clements, who served as his mentor and as a chaplain for the local Panther chapter. Hampton and the Panthers also used Clements's parish, Holy Angels Catholic Church in Chicago (now the parish of Our Lady of Africa), as a refuge in times of particular surveillance or pursuit from the police. They also provided security for several of Clements's "Black Unity Masses", part of his revolutionary activities during the Black Catholic Movement. Clements spoke at Hampton's funeral, and also said a Requiem Mass for him at Holy Angels.

== Legacy ==
=== Legal and political effects ===
According to a 2007 Chicago Tribune report, "The raid ended the promising political career of Cook County State's Atty. Edward V. Hanrahan, who was indicted but cleared with 13 other law-enforcement agents on charges of obstructing justice. Bernard Carey, a Republican, defeated him in the next election, in part because of the support of outraged black voters." The families of Hampton and Clark filed a $47.7 million civil suit against the city, state, and federal governments. The case went to trial before Federal Judge J. Sam Perry. After more than 18 months of testimony and at the close of the plaintiff's case, Perry dismissed the case. The plaintiffs appealed, and the U.S. Court of Appeals for the Seventh Circuit reversed, ordering the case to be retried. More than a decade after the case had been filed, the suit was finally settled for $1.85 million. The two families each shared in the settlement.

Jeffrey Haas, with his law partners G. Flint Taylor and Dennis Cunningham and attorney James D. Montgomery, were the attorneys for the plaintiffs in the federal suit Hampton v. Hanrahan, conducted additional research and wrote a book about these events. It was published in 2009. He said that Chicago was worse off without Hampton:

Of course, there's also the legacy that, without a young leader, I think the West Side of Chicago degenerated a lot into drugs. And without leaders like Fred Hampton, I think the gangs and the drugs became much more prevalent on the West Side. He was an alternative to that. He talked about serving the community, talked about breakfast programs, educating the people, community control of police. So I think that that's unfortunately another legacy of Fred's murder.

In 1990, the Chicago City Council unanimously passed a resolution, introduced by then-Alderman Madeline Haithcock, commemorating December 4, 2004, as Fred Hampton Day in Chicago. The resolution read in part:

Fred Hampton, who was only 21 years old, made his mark in Chicago history not so much by his death as by the heroic efforts of his life and by his goals of empowering the most oppressed sector of Chicago's Black community, bringing people into political life through participation in their own freedom fighting organization.

=== Monuments and streets ===
- A public pool was named in his honor in his hometown of Maywood, Illinois.
- On September 7, 2007, a bust of Hampton by sculptor Preston Jackson was erected outside the Fred Hampton Family Aquatic Center in Maywood.
- In March 2006, supporters of Hampton's charity work proposed the naming of a Chicago street in his honor. Chicago's chapter of the Fraternal Order of Police opposed this effort.
- On April 19, 2022 the Village Board of Maywood designated Hampton's childhood home as a historical landmark.
- On what would have been Hampton's 77th birthday (August 30, 2025), a "Chairman Fred Hampton Way" street sign was unveiled on the block near 2337 W. Monroe St. in Chicago.

=== Weather Underground reaction ===
Two days after the killings of Hampton and Clark, on December 6, 1969, members of the Weathermen destroyed numerous police vehicles in a retaliatory bombing spree at 3600 N. Halsted Street in Chicago. After that, the group became more radical. On May 21, 1970, the group issued a "Declaration of War" against the U.S. government and, for the first time, used its new name, the "Weather Underground Organization". They adopted fake identities and decided to pursue covert activities only. These initially included preparations to bomb a U.S. military non-commissioned officers' dance at Fort Dix, New Jersey, in what Brian Flanagan later said was intended to be "the most horrific hit the United States government had ever suffered on its territory".

"We've known that our job is to lead white kids into armed revolution... Kids know the lines are drawn: revolution is touching all of our lives. Tens of thousands have learned that protest and marches don't do it. Revolutionary violence is the only way." —Bernardine Dohrn

=== Media and popular culture ===
==== In film ====
A 27-minute documentary, Death of a Black Panther: The Fred Hampton Story, was used as evidence in the civil suit. The 2002 documentary The Weather Underground shows in detail how that group was deeply influenced by Hampton and his death—as well as showing that Hampton kept his distance from them for being what he called "adventuristic, masochistic and Custeristic".

Much of the first half of Eyes on the Prize episode 12, "A Nation of Law?", chronicles Hampton's leadership and extrajudicial killing. The events of his rise to prominence, Hoover's targeting of him, and Hampton's subsequent death are also recounted with footage in the 2015 documentary The Black Panthers: Vanguard of the Revolution.

The Murder of Fred Hampton is a documentary shot from within the movement, released in 1971. It has no narration, relying solely on footage shot from within the Black Panther organization and portraying Hampton and his colleagues on their own terms.

In the 1999 TV miniseries The 60s, Hampton appears serving free breakfast with the BPP. David Alan Grier plays Hampton.

In 2020, documentary First Rainbow Coalition, which discussed Hampton's role in organizing the First Rainbow Coalition would be released as an episode of PBS tv series Independent Lens.

The Trial of the Chicago 7 (2020) features Kelvin Harrison Jr. as Hampton, in which he advises Bobby Seale as he was denied counsel, with the Chicago Seven.

Judas and the Black Messiah is a 2021 film about O'Neal's betrayal of Hampton. The film stars Daniel Kaluuya as Hampton and was directed by Shaka King. It premiered at the Sundance Film Festival on February 1, 2021. For his performance, Kaluuya won the Academy Award for Best Supporting Actor.

==== In literature ====
- Jeffrey Haas wrote an account of Hampton's death, The Assassination of Fred Hampton: How the FBI and the Chicago Police Murdered a Black Panther (2009).
- Stephen King refers to Hampton in the novel 11/22/63 (2012), in which a character discusses the ripple effect of traveling back in time to prevent John F. Kennedy's assassination. He postulates that other events would follow that could have prevented Hampton's assassination as well.

==== In music ====
- In his song Murder to Excellence, American rapper and entrepreneur Jay-Z referred to being born on the same day Hampton died. Hampton's son criticized Jay-Z for doing so, saying his father did not die, but was assassinated.
- American rock band Rage Against the Machine referenced Hampton in its 1996 song Down Rodeo, saying, "They ain't gonna send us campin' like they did my man Fred Hampton."
- Kendrick Lamar refers to Hampton in his song "HiiiPoWeR", which also contains references to black civil rights activists Martin Luther King, Jr., Malcolm X, and Huey Newton.
- Artists SEIITH and Kiko King referenced Hampton in their 2020 song "Ghost of Fred Hampton".
- Killer Mike references Hampton's murder in "Don't Die" on his 2012 album R.A.P. Music.

== See also ==
- List of homicides in Illinois
- List of assassinated human rights activists
