= Edward Hanrahan =

American politician (1921–2009)

Cook County State's Attorney
- In office 1968–1972
- Preceded by: John J. Stamos
- Succeeded by: Bernard Carey

United States Attorney for the Northern District of Illinois
- In office 1964–1968
- President: Lyndon B. Johnson
- Preceded by: Frank E. McDonald
- Succeeded by: Tom Foran

Personal details
- Born: Edward Vincent Hanrahan; March 11, 1921 Coconut Grove, Florida, U.S.
- Died: June 9, 2009 (aged 88) River Forest, Illinois, U.S.
- Party: Democratic
- Children: 4
- Education: University of Notre Dame (BS); Harvard University (LLB)

Military service
- Branch/service: United States Army
- Battles/wars: World War II

Edward Vincent Hanrahan (March 11, 1921 – June 9, 2009) was an American attorney and politician who served as Cook County State's Attorney from 1968 to 1972. Hanrahan had been a prospective successor to Mayor of Chicago Richard J. Daley. His career was effectively ended after Black Panther Party leader Fred Hampton and member Mark Clark were assassinated in a raid by police coordinated by his office in 1969.

== Early life and education ==
Hanrahan was born in Coconut Grove, Florida, and moved as a child to Chicago with his family. He earned a degree in accounting from the University of Notre Dame. During World War II, he served in an intelligence role in the United States Army Signal Corps. After completing his military service, he attended Harvard Law School and earned his law degree in 1948.

== Career ==
Chicago mayor Richard J. Daley supported his successful bid for an appointment as United States Attorney for the Northern District of Illinois in 1964. Hanrahan got the post after Daley told President of the United States Lyndon B. Johnson "Let me say, Mr. President, with great pride and honor, he's a precinct captain." Running as a Democrat, he won a landslide election in 1968 for Cook County State's Attorney, winning support from White and African American voters.

Acting on the basis of a tip from an FBI informant (William O'Neal), 14 police officers assigned to Hanrahan's office staged a pre-dawn raid on December 4, 1969, to search for illegal weapons in the West Side apartment of Fred Hampton, a leader of the Black Panther Party. Dozens of shots were fired and Hampton and Black Panther Mark Clark were both killed. Despite guns found on the premises and police assertions that the Panthers had fired first, bullet hole markings presented by police in support of their claim turned out to be nail heads. An investigation found that the police had fired between 82 and 99 shots during the raid, and the Panthers had fired at least one shot. Hanrahan was indicted by a grand jury for obstructing justice and conspiracy to present false evidence, but was later acquitted. A civil suit concluded in 1982 ruled that there was a government conspiracy to deprive the Black Panthers of their civil rights and awarded nearly $2 million to the survivors of the raid and the families of those killed. The events leading up to the incident and the deaths of Hampton and Clark were the subject of the 1971 documentary The Murder of Fred Hampton, and the material filmed by director Howard Alk in the immediate aftermath of the incident was used as evidence in the civil suit.

The Cook County Democratic Party declined to endorse Hanrahan in his bid for reelection as State's Attorney in 1972, but Democratic voters renominated him anyway. The combined votes of Republicans and African American Democrats sufficed to elect his Republican opponent in the general election.

== Post-State's Attorney ==
He ran for Mayor of Chicago in the Democratic primaries of 1975 and of 1977, losing respectively to Daley and Michael Bilandic; Hanrahan placed fourth each time. In the 1974 congressional election for Illinois's 6th congressional district, Hanrahan lost to Henry Hyde. In the 1980 special election to represent the 36th ward on the Chicago City Council, Hanrahan finished third of four candidates, losing to incumbent appointee Louis Farina.

== Personal life ==
Hanrahan and his wife were married for 55 years and had four children. Hanrahan died at age 88 on June 9, 2009, at his home in River Forest, Illinois, due to complications from leukemia.
