= Mark Clark (activist) =

African-American activist (1947–1969)

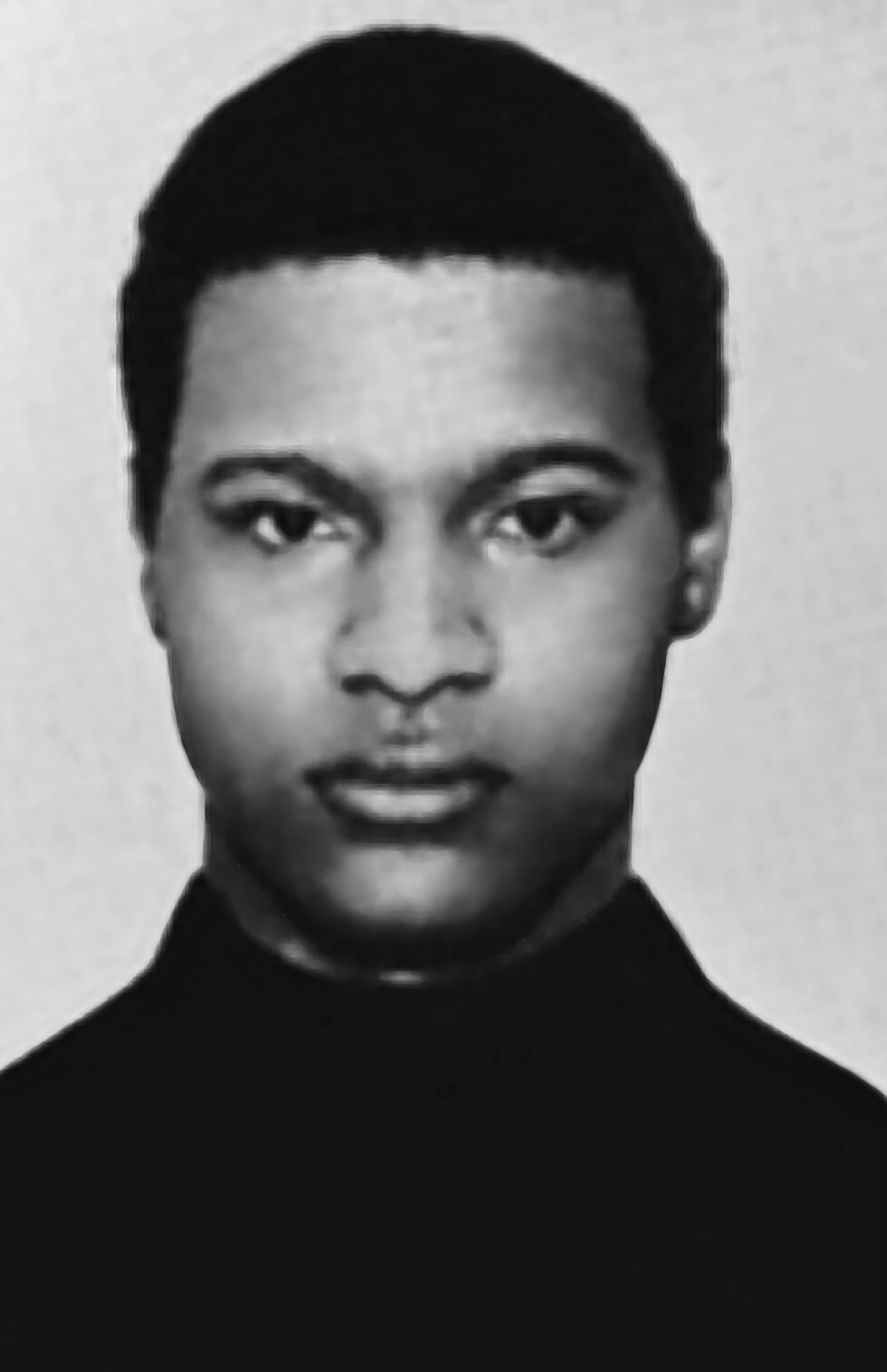
- Clark in 1969
- Born: June 28, 1947; Peoria, Illinois, U.S.
- Died: December 4, 1969 (aged 22); Chicago, Illinois, U.S.
- Cause of death: Killed (gunshot wounds) by Chicago police
- Citizenship: United States
- Education: Manual High School; Illinois Central College
- Occupation: Activist
- Years active: 1966–1969
- Political party: Black Panther

Mark Clark (June 28, 1947 – December 4, 1969) was an American activist and member of the Black Panther Party (BPP). Clark was instrumental in the creation of the enduring Free Breakfast Program in his hometown of Peoria, Illinois, as well as the Peoria branch's engagement in local rainbow coalition politics, primarily revolving around the anti-war movement. He was killed on December 4, 1969, with Fred Hampton, state chairman of the Black Panthers, during a predawn Chicago Police raid.

In January 1970, a coroner's jury held an inquest and ruled the deaths of Clark and Hampton to be justifiable homicide. Survivors and the relatives of Clark and Hampton filed a wrongful death lawsuit against the City of Chicago, Cook County, and the federal government (specifically the FBI). It was settled in November 1982, with each entity paying $616,333 to a group of nine plaintiffs.

== Youth ==
Clark was born on June 28, 1947, in Peoria, Illinois. He was the ninth child of Fannie Mae Clark and Pastor William Clark. Clark grew up in a religious home, as his father was the founder of the Holy Temple Church of God in Christ, and was known from childhood to be stubborn, principled, and possessing great empathy for the downtrodden. His family members note that as a junior high school student, he regularly attended the Carver Community Center where he practiced drawing, painting, and carving. According to John Gwynn, former president of state and local chapters of the NAACP, Clark and his brothers played a role in helping keep other teenagers in line. "He could call for order when older persons or adults could not", Gwynn said of Clark in a December 1969 interview with the Chicago Tribune. In that same Chicago Tribune article, family members are quoted as saying Clark enjoyed reading and art, and was good at drawing portraits. He attended Manual High School and Illinois Central College in East Peoria.

Following the 1963 Birmingham Alabama protests where white police officers let dogs loose on Black protestors, resulting in numerous severe injuries, Clark joined the Peoria Illinois National Association for the Advancement of Colored People (NAACP) chapter at age 15 under the leadership of chapter president John Gwynn and vice president Reverend Blaine Ramsey Jr. Clark became increasingly involved in the NAACP, attending the August 1963 March on Washington for Jobs and Freedom where Martin Luther King Jr. delivered his famed I Have a Dream speech. Clark was instrumental in organizing a boycott to demand that books about African American history be included in the Manuel High School curriculum, where he attended.

Although Clark displayed considerable talent in art, drama, and speech, he quit school in the 8th grade. Despite liking the process of learning, Clark did not like school, likely due to the racially inhospitable environment that black students were forced to endure in Manual. After quitting high school, Clark enrolled in a few courses at Illinois Central College in East Peoria, where he was actively involved in the Black Student Union. There, he participated in political education work to raise the political consciousness of Black Peoria residents.

Due to his involvement in the NAACP, even prior to his joining of the Black Panther Party, Clark was a target of the Peoria police department. According to his sister, Gloria Clark Jackson, Clark was repeatedly beaten and detained on bogus charges, a common practice in Peoria at the time, as many police officers were members of the Ku Klux Klan (KKK).

== Black Panther Party ==
Clark was first introduced to the Black Panther Party in December 1968 through family friend Henry Howard, who was a party member in San Francisco. After Howard successfully encouraged him to join the Panthers, Clark accompanied him to Chicago to pick up reports from the Chicago chapter prior to going to the Central Committee office in Oakland, California. It was on this trip that Clark first met deputy chairman of the Illinois Party chapter, Fred Hampton. Upon meeting Clark, Hampton asked him to remain in Chicago for three months in order to train and acquire the skills necessary to start a local branch in Peoria. During these three months, Clark was trained in leadership, took political education classes, and read Panther literature, including the Ten Point Program. During this time, Clark became good friends with Hampton, a friendship that endured throughout their lives.

By early 1969, Clark had been inducted into the Black Panther Party by the Central Committee, and was appointed the party's Defense Captain, giving him the responsibility of protecting and defending the Panthers at all costs. Upon returning to Peoria, Clark immediately recruited members to the newly created Peoria branch, including his younger sister Gloria and younger brother Joseph. At only 22 years old, Clark quickly established the Peoria branch, and by July 1969, the branch had around 50 official members and 20 affiliates. As the branch's founder and leader, Clark taught political education classes where he explained that democracy cannot exist within a system that is built upon white supremacy, using a largely Maoist lens. He and other party members read Mao's Little Red Book in order to study revolutionary tactics in the case of revolution.

Clark began a Free Breakfast Program in NAACP vice president Reverend Blaine Ramsey Jr.'s Ward Chapel AME Church. Clark expanded upon the Panthers' survival pending revolution programming, establishing free clothing and shoe giveaways for children, and was in the process of establishing a free clinic and a sickle cell foundation at the time of his death. These programs were funded by both donations, solicited through charity or boycotts of local businesses, and the sale of the party's newspaper. Even as he led the Peoria party branch, Clark remained involved in the Chicago chapter. He, and the rest of the Peoria branch, regularly visited Chicago to participate in chapter meetings in which Clark often addressed crowds of between 300 and 400 people as the party's Defense Captain.

Clark also spearheaded the Peoria Panther branch's engagement in local rainbow coalition politics, which was another cornerstone of Panther organizing. The local rainbow coalition comprised the Peoria Panther branch, the Students for a Democratic Society (SDS), the Black Student Alliance, and the Peoria Peace Congress. Their activities mainly revolved around anti-Vietnam war protests and peace rallies. While nearly all Panther affiliates participated in these activities, the Peoria Panthers' opposition to prostitution was uniquely attached to the locality of the branch; following the example of Panthers in Houston, Texas who disrupted prostitution on Dowling Street, Clark and his fellow comrades made efforts to curtail the exploitation of black women at the hands of black pimps and white "johns" in Peoria.

Ward Chapel congregation members eventually voted against Clark's continuous involvement in the Free Breakfast Program due to suspicion of government monitoring, which would later be revealed to be true as the U.S. Federal Bureau of Investigation was running a massive, illegal, disruption and neutralization campaign against the Black Panther Party as part of the FBI's Counterintelligence Program (COINTELPRO). At one point, Rev. Ramsey was ousted as the church's pastor due to his permitting the Peoria Panthers to use church facilities for the Free Breakfast Program. Despite this resistance, borne out of concern and fear rather than hostility to the cause, the program persists to this day.

== Murder ==
In late November 1969, Clark made the decision to go to Chicago following the death of Panther Spurgeon (Jake) Winters, who had just been killed by the Chicago Police Department in a shootout that claimed the life of two police officers. Clark's family and friends, as well as Clark himself, knew that the party had likely been infiltrated by the FBI and that his life was in danger upon arriving in Chicago: as he prepared to return to Chicago on Thanksgiving Day, November 27, Clark told family members, "I probably won't see ya'll again, but just know that I love all of you."

Around 4:45 am on December 4, 1969, Chicago Police raided the apartment of Chairman Fred Hampton at 2337 West Monroe Street, using a search warrant for the alleged possession of illegal weapons. No illegal weapons have ever been found. The Chicago police killed both Mark Clark (age 22)) and Fred Hampton (age 21) and caused serious bodily harm to Verlina Brewer, Ronald "Doc" Satchel, Blair Nderson, and Brenda Harris, firing between 82 and 99 shots into the apartment.

Hampton and Akua Njeri (then known as Deborah Johnson), who was eight-and-a-half months pregnant with their child, were sleeping in the south bedroom. Satchel, Anderson, and Brewer were asleep in the north bedroom. Harris and Louis Truelock were sleeping on a bed by the south wall of the living room, and Harold Bell slept on a mattress on the floor in the middle of the room. Clark, sitting in the front room of the apartment with a shotgun in his lap, was on security duty.

Because he was on security duty, CPD shot Clark first, hitting him in the heart. Contrary to the offending officer's initial report, which claimed that Clark attempted to shoot back and physically struggled, Clark died instantly. His gun went off as he fell, later determined to be caused by a reflexive death convulsion after he had been hit by the initial shot. Forensic evidence later revealed that this was the only shot that the Panthers fired. A federal grand jury determined that the police fired between 82 and 99 shots, including into bedrooms, while most of the occupants lay sleeping.

Ten days after the murders of Hampton and Clark, Bobby Rush, then the "minister of defense" for the Illinois Black Panther party, called the raiding party an "execution squad".

=== Inquest ===
Shortly afterwards, Cook County Coroner Andrew Toman began forming a special six-member coroner's jury to hold an inquest into the deaths of Clark and Hampton. On December 23, Toman announced four additions to the jury which included two African-American men: physician Theodore K. Lawless and attorney Julian B. Wilkins, the son of J. Ernest Wilkins Sr. He stated the four were selected from a group of candidates submitted to his office by groups and individuals representing both Chicago's black and white communities. Civil rights leaders and spokesmen for the black community were reported to have been disappointed with the selection. An official with the Chicago Urban League said: "I would have had more confidence in the jury if one of them had been a black man who has a rapport with the young and the grass roots in the community." Gus Savage said that such a man to whom the community could relate need not be black. The jury eventually included a third black man who was a member of the first coroner's jury sworn in on December 4.

The blue-ribbon panel convened for the inquest on January 6, 1970, and on January 21 ruled the deaths of Clark and Hampton to be justifiable homicide. The jury qualified their verdict on the death of Hampton as "based solely and exclusively on the evidence presented to this inquisition"; police and expert witness provided the only testimony during the inquest. Jury foreman James T. Hicks stated that they could not consider the charges of the Black Panthers in the apartment who stated that the police entered the apartment shooting; those who survived the raid were reported to have refused to testify during the inquest because they faced criminal charges of attempted murder and aggravated assault during the raid. Attorneys for the Clark and Hampton families did not introduce any witnesses during the proceedings, but described the inquest as "a well-rehearsed theatrical performance designed to vindicate the police officers". State's Attorney Edward Hanrahan said the verdict was recognition "of the truthfulness of our police officers' account of the events".

=== Civil rights lawsuit ===
In 1970, a $47.7 million lawsuit was filed on behalf of the survivors and the relatives of Clark and Hampton stating that the civil rights of the Black Panther members were violated. Twenty-eight defendants were named, including Hanrahan as well as the City of Chicago, Cook County, and federal governments. The following trial lasted 18 months and was reported to have been the longest federal trial up to that time. After its conclusion in 1977, Judge Joseph Sam Perry of United States District Court for the Northern District of Illinois dismissed the suit against 21 of the defendants prior to jury deliberations. Perry dismissed the suit against the remaining defendants after jurors deadlocked. In 1979, the United States Court of Appeals for the Seventh Circuit in Chicago stated that the government had withheld relevant documents, thereby obstructing the judicial process. Reinstating the case against 24 of the defendants, the Court of Appeals ordered a new trial. The Supreme Court of the United States heard an appeal but voted 5–3 in 1980 to return the case to the District Court for a new trial.

In 1982, the City of Chicago, Cook County, and the federal government agreed to a settlement in which each would pay $616,333 to a group of nine plaintiffs, including the mothers of Clark and Hampton. The $1.85 million settlement was believed to be the largest ever in a civil rights case.

== Legacy ==
In the aftermath of the 1969 raid and assassination, media coverage largely treated Clark as an afterthought to Hampton. Hampton's name was mentioned far more frequently than Clark's in every newspaper of the time, across both the black and the mainstream press. Scholars believe this framing in the press may explain why Clark has been marginalized in both the collective historical memory of his life and work as a Panther, as well as in subsequent writings about his death.

Clark's hometown newspaper, the Peoria Journal Star, vilified his character in reports after his murder: articles focused on him dropping out of school in the eighth grade, his legal troubles and his lengthy arrest record (including the fraudulent assault charges for which he was imprisoned twice). In a blistering editorial published just a week after the raid, the Peoria Journal Star expressly characterized Clark as a misguided young man led astray by the Black Panthers: "The real sympathy that the Panthers need from black leaders of the day is the kind which attempts to protect these young men not from the Police but from the idiotic Panther leadership which should not be allowed to continue to drive young men like Mark Clark to early graves."

After the fatal raid, around 1,000 mourners attended Clark's funeral in Peoria, including then-NAACP vice president and local pastor Rev. Blaine Ramsey. Clark's body was dressed in his Panther uniform: his official black leather jacket and the black beret indicating his Panther leadership. During his eulogy, Rev. Ramsey asserted that "certainly, Mark Clark should be considered one of the martyrs to the cause of black dignity and human equality." Despite the local press downplaying Clark's significance, personal accounts from family, community members, and friends and fellow comrades portray Clark as a principled and empathetic leader who always sought to uplift the poor and marginalized.

Efforts to honor Clark's life and legacy persist, in Peoria and beyond. The Free Breakfast Program that Clark initiated in Ward Chapel AME Church still exists today: though no longer specifically catering to the youth, the free breakfast ministry at the church continues to feed thousands year after year. Cleo Carter, the director of Ward Chapel's breakfast ministry, still thinks of Clark to this day and credits the origins of the ministry to Clark's efforts.

Clark's younger sister, Gloria Clark Jackson, published a book in 2020 detailing the untold story of her brother's life, death, and legacy: "This book is my concerted effort to make sure that Mark's legacy is never forgotten nor lost to future generations. Mark was one of many fallen comrades who[se] names are lesser known and rarely talked about: They were the real heroes of the revolution." A mural in Chicago commemorates his life alongside Hampton's on a building just a mile away from where both men were killed, and his and Hampton's deaths were the main feature of the 2017 "Black Panther Party 50-Year Retrospective Exhibit" at the Movement & Justice Gallery inside Chicago's Westside Justice Center. Clark is also recognized with a plaque at Peoria's African American Hall of Fame museum, and a scholarship named Seize the Time has been established in his memory for African American students at Illinois Central College.

== Weather Underground reaction ==
By December 1969, the Weathermen had already split from the SDS and conducted a series of radical actions that faced police pushback. However it wasn't until the assassination of Clark and Hampton, which was widely known to most likely be FBI led, paired with the Kent State Massacre 5 months later, that the group took steps to further radicalization. Following the May 4th Massacre the group went "underground," adopting fake identities, and pursuing covert activities only. On May 21, 1970, they issued a "Declaration of War" against the United States government, using for the first time its new name, the "Weather Underground Organization" (WUO). Following the declaration, the WUO prepared for a bombing of a U.S. military non-commissioned officers' dance at Fort Dix, New Jersey, in what Brian Flanagan said had been intended to be "the most horrific hit the United States government had ever suffered on its territory".
