= Coroner's jury =

Jury convened to assist a coroner

A coroner's jury is a body convened to assist a coroner in an inquest, that is, in determining the identity of a deceased person and the cause of death. The laws on its role and function vary by jurisdiction.

== United Kingdom ==
In England and Wales, all inquests were once conducted with a jury. They acted somewhat like a grand jury, determining whether a person should be committed to trial in connection to a death. Such a jury was made up of up to twenty-three men, and required the votes of twelve to render a decision. Similar to a grand jury, a coroner's jury merely accused, it did not convict.

There are no coroners in Scotland, which has its own legal system. The Scottish equivalent of an inquest is a fatal accident inquiry, held where there is a sudden, suspicious, accidental, or unexplained death, which is ordered by a procurator fiscal and presided over by a sheriff without a jury.

Since 1927, coroner's juries have rarely been used in England. Under the Coroners Act 1988, a jury is only required to be convened in cases where the death occurred in prison, police custody, or in circumstances which may affect public health or safety. The coroner can actually choose to convene a jury in any investigation, but in practice this is rare. The qualifications to sit on a coroner's jury are the same as those to sit on a jury in Crown Court, the High Court, and the County Court.

Additionally, a coroner's jury only determines cause of death; its ruling does not commit a person to trial. While grand juries, which did have the power to indict, were abolished in the United Kingdom by 1948 (after being effectively stopped in 1933), coroner's juries retained those powers until the Criminal Law Act 1977. This change came about after a coroner's jury charged Lord Lucan in 1975 in the death of Sandra Rivett, his children's nanny.

== United States ==
In the aftermath of the Triangle Shirtwaist Factory fire, a coroner's jury found factory owners Isaac Harris and Max Blanck responsible for the death of Mary Herman, a factory operator.

A coroner's jury ruled that the 2018 Hart family crash in Mendocino County, California, was deliberate.
