= The Harder They Fall (soundtrack) =

Film score

The Harder They Fall (The Motion Picture Soundtrack)

Soundtrack album by various artists
- Released: October 29, 2021
- Genre: Hip hop; reggae; reggaeton; R&B
- Length: 40:40
- Label: Roc Nation
- Producer: Jay-Z (executive); Jeymes Samuel

The Harder They Fall (Original Score)

Film score by Jeymes Samuel
- Released: January 14, 2022
- Genre: Orchestra
- Length: 43:00
- Label: Geneva Club; Roc Nation
- Producer: Jeymes Samuel

Jeymes Samuel chronology
They Die By Dawn & Other Short Stories... (2013)	The Harder They Fall (Original Score) (2022)	The Book of Clarence (The Motion Picture Soundtrack) (2024)

The soundtrack for the 2021 American Western film The Harder They Fall, produced by Overbrook Entertainment, consists of an original score composed by the film's writer and director Jeymes Samuel, as well as original songs performed by various artists.

The original soundtrack was released on October 29, 2021, by Roc Nation ahead of the film's streaming release on Netflix the following week. In addition to streaming and digital formats, the album was physically released on CD, vinyl, and cassette. The 14 track album is composed of original songs written for the film performed by Jeymes Samuel, Jay-Z, Kid Cudi, CeeLo Green, Seal, and Laura Mvula among others with skits taken from the film interspersed.

The original score was released digitally by Roc Nation on January 14, 2022. The score was composed entirely by Samuel, featuring The Chamber Orchestra of London on several tracks.

== Background ==
Jeymes Samuel, the film's writer, director, composer, and producer, wrote and produced all songs on the soundtrack alongside contributions from some of the soundtracks' performers. Samuel also executive produced the soundtrack with Jay-Z, with whom he had collaborated previously on The Great Gatsby: Music from Baz Luhrmann's Film, with Carter serving as executive producer and Samuel serving as executive musical consultant under his stage name The Bullitts. All of the songs on the soundtrack appear in the film, and the track "Guns Go Bang" first appeared in the film's trailer on September 28. Samuel, known for blending film and music, explained his approach to the soundtrack as "a versatile body of work that blends genres and eras in an innovative way."

== Critical reception ==
The soundtrack was released to positive reviews, both for the roster of artists included and the quality of its songs. The "star-studded" collaborations were praised for celebrating "every corner of Black culture". The songs, described as "winningly cinematic" by Variety, were hailed for their "dynamic, symphonic grandness" and for representing a range of genres while "maintaining a cohesive sense of sonic drama." Samuel's use of the "anachronistic soundtrack" in the film received high praise as well. In contrast to the scores typical of classic Westerns, Samuel employed music from modern genres such as hip hop, reggae, and R&B, which was "expertly placed to emphasize the events of the movie in a way that goes beyond audiences' normal expectations from a movie score" according to Screen Rant.

== Release ==
=== The Harder They Fall (The Motion Picture Soundtrack) ===
The Harder They Fall (The Motion Picture Soundtrack) track listing
No.	Title	Writer(s)	Performer(s)	Length
1.	"Lightnin' With The Blam Blams (Skit)"	Jeymes Samuel	Edi Gathegi, R.J. Cyler	0:14
2.	"The Harder They Fall"	Samuel, Shawn Carter	Koffee	2:48
3.	"Guns Go Bang"	Samuel, Scott Mescudi, Carter	Kid Cudi, Jay-Z	3:26
4.	"Better Than Gold"	Samuel	Barrington Levy	5:53
5.	"Black Woman"	Samuel, Ms. Lauryn Hill	Fatoumata Diawara, Ms. Lauryn Hill	3:58
6.	"Wednesday's Child"	Samuel	Alice Smith	2:39
7.	"Blackskin Mile"	Samuel	CeeLo Green	4:10
8.	"Ain't No Better Love"	Samuel, Seal, James Poyser	Seal	4:45
9.	"We Ain't No Nincompoop (Skit)"	Samuel	LaKeith Stanfield, Regina King	0:17
10.	"King Kong Riddim (featuring BackRoad Gee)"	Samuel, Carter, Jason Phillips, Demond Price	Jay-Z, Jadakiss, Conway the Machine	3:34
11.	"We Go Harder"	Samuel	Laura Mvula, Mayra Andrade	2:53
12.	"Is The Devil Dead? (Skit)"	Samuel	Zazie Beetz, Jonathan Majors	0:09
13.	"No Turning Around"	Samuel	Jeymes Samuel	1:55
14.	"Three And Thirty Years"	Samuel	Pretty Yende	3:51
Total length:				40:40

=== The Harder They Fall (Original Score) ===
An album featuring Samuel's score was released digitally by Roc Nation on January 14, 2022.

- All music composed by Jeymes Samuel

The Harder They Fall (Original Score) track listing
No.	Title	Length
1.	"Three and Thirty Years" (with The Chamber Orchestra of London)	2:41
2.	"Jesus Cortez" (with The Chamber Orchestra of London)	2:32
3.	"The Jim Crow Count"	1:00
4.	"Away With The Wind She Goes" (with The Chamber Orchestra of London)	0:53
5.	"Away With The Wind She Goes (Part 2)" (with The Chamber Orchestra of London)	1:14
6.	"Dead Man's Valentine"	0:40
7.	"Do Unto Others / Ride Out"	3:43
8.	"Showdown / Shootout" (with The Chamber Orchestra of London)	3:45
9.	"Pick Up Your Guns and Turn Around" (with The Chamber Orchestra of London)	1:28
10.	"Three and Thirty Years (Fisk Jubilee Singers)"	2:10
11.	"Everything You Love Will Burn" (with The Chamber Orchestra of London)	3:47
12.	"It's a White Town" (with The Chamber Orchestra of London)	2:49
13.	"Everyone But Him" (with The Chamber Orchestra of London)	1:03
14.	"Sun Up, No Mary" (with The Chamber Orchestra of London)	0:58
15.	"Redwood Theme" (with The Chamber Orchestra of London)	1:34
16.	"Is That The Right Arm or the Left?" (with The Chamber Orchestra of London)	1:50
17.	"Ride Out (Part 2)"	0:51
18.	"Clearly… You Don't Know Me" (with The Chamber Orchestra of London)	3:02
19.	"The Return of Nat Love"	2:02
20.	"Wiley Dynamite" (with The Chamber Orchestra of London)	1:00
21.	"Bad Karma In The Afterlife" (with The Chamber Orchestra of London)	1:40
22.	"The Harder They Fall Choir" (with The Chamber Orchestra of London)	2:02
Total length:		43:00
