= List of accolades received by Once Upon a Time in Hollywood =

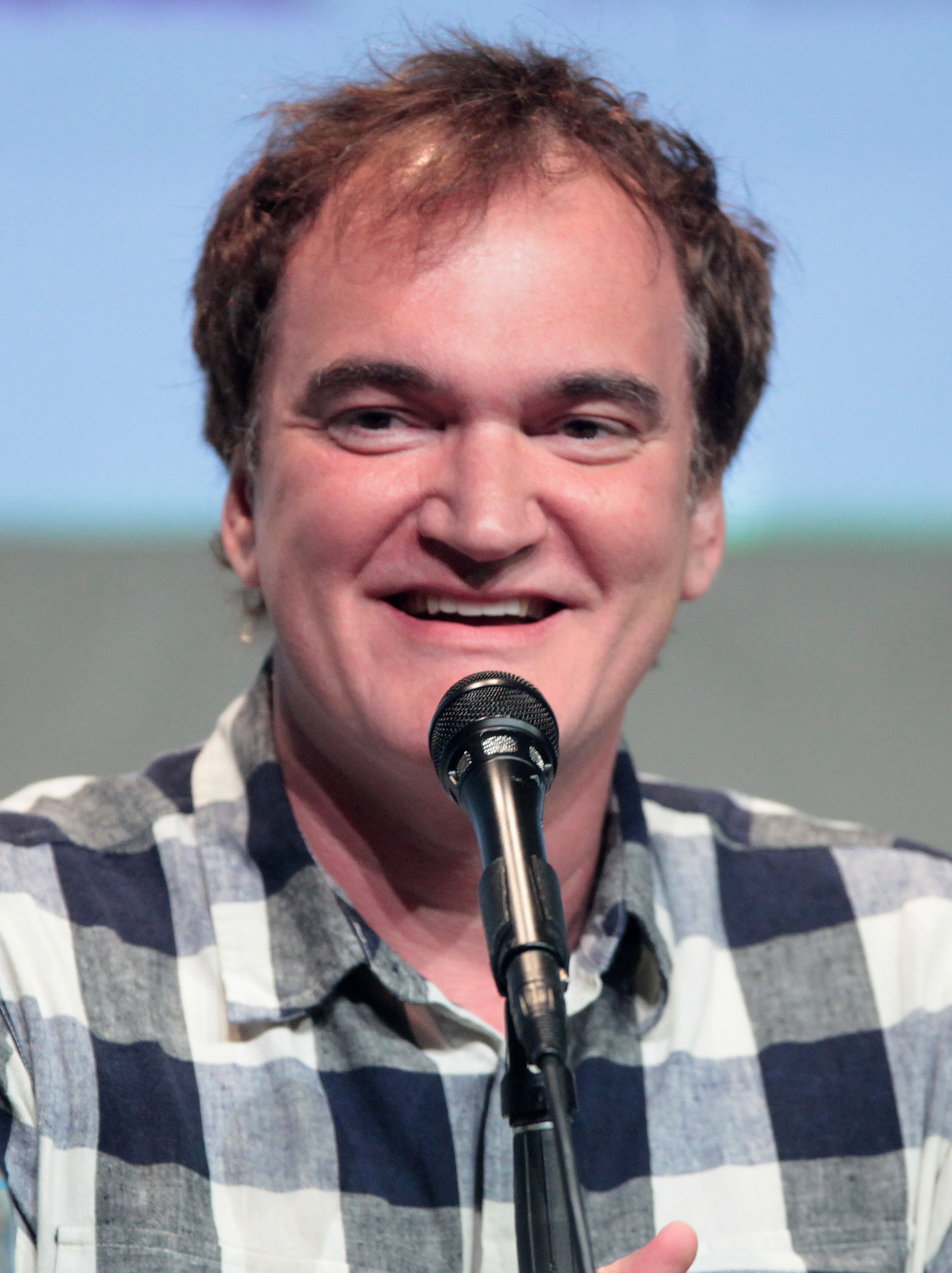
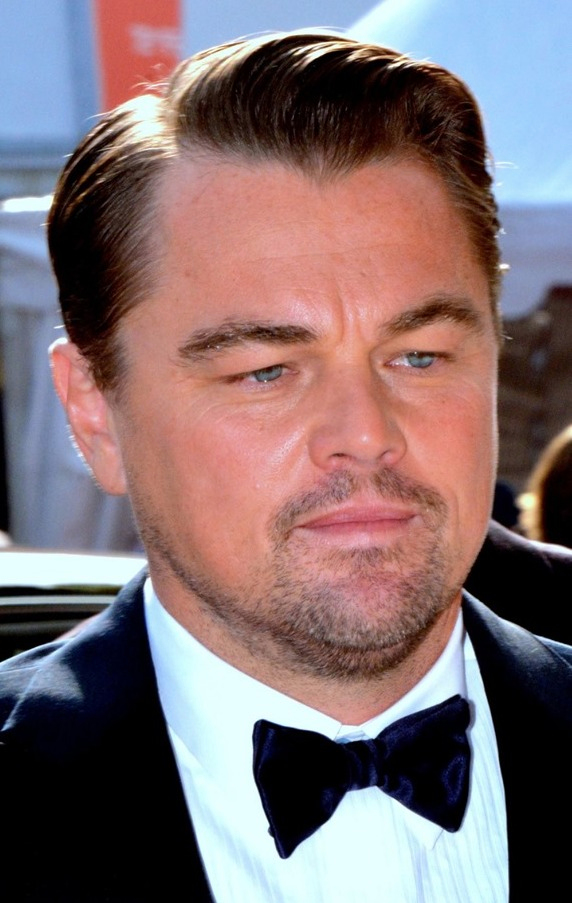
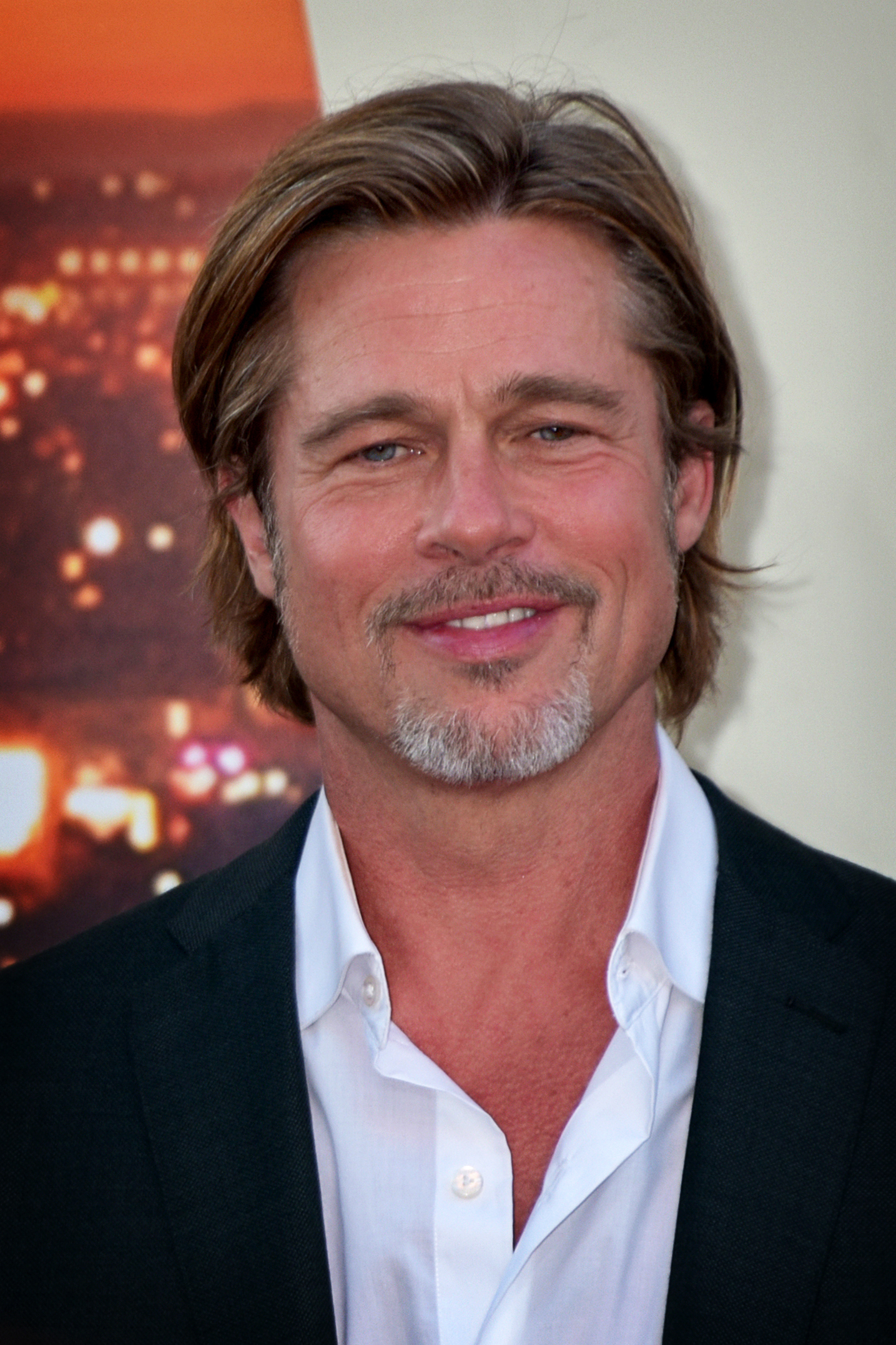
- Quentin Tarantino (left) received critical acclaim for his screenplay and direction, and Leonardo DiCaprio (middle) and Brad Pitt (right) for their performances
Accolades
Award	Wins	Nominations
AACTA International Awards	2	5
AARP's Movies for Grownups Awards	0	6
Academy Awards	2	10
Alliance of Women Film Journalists Awards	1	7
American Cinema Editors	0	1
American Film Institute Awards	1	1
American Society of Cinematographers Awards	0	1
Art Directors Guild Awards	0	1
Austin Film Critics Association Awards	2	10
Boston Society of Film Critics Awards	2	4
British Academy Film Awards	1	10
Cannes Film Festival	1	2
Casting Society of America	0	1
Chicago Film Critics Association	2	9
Cinema Audio Society Awards	0	1
Costume Designers Guild Awards	0	1
Critics' Choice Movie Awards	4	12
Dallas–Fort Worth Film Critics Association	4	4
Detroit Film Critics Society	2	6
Georgia Film Critics Association Awards	0	9
Golden Globe Awards	3	5
Golden Trailer Awards	1	2
Grammy Awards	0	1
Hollywood Critics Association	0	11
Locarno International Film Festival	0	1
Los Angeles Film Critics Association	1	1
Make-Up Artists and Hair Stylists Guild	0	2
National Board of Review	3	3
New York Film Critics Circle	1	1
New York Film Critics Online	1	1
Online Film Critics Society	1	7
People's Choice Awards	0	2
San Diego Film Critics Society	2	10
Satellite Awards	1	7
Saturn Awards	3	7
Screen Actors Guild Awards	1	4
Seattle Film Critics Society	1	8
St. Louis Film Critics Association	9	10
Toronto Film Critics Association	1	1
Vancouver Film Critics Circle	1	2
Washington D.C. Area Film Critics Association	2	10

Totals (Note: Certain award groups do not simply award one winner. They acknowledge several different recipients, have runners-up, and have third place. Since this is a specific recognition and is different from losing an award, runner-up mentions are considered wins in this award tally. For simplification and to avoid errors, each award in this list has been presumed to have had a prior nomination.)
- Wins: 48
- Nominations: 190

Once Upon a Time in Hollywood is a 2019 comedy-drama film written and directed by Quentin Tarantino. Produced by Columbia Pictures, Bona Film Group, Heyday Films, and Visiona Romantica and distributed by Sony Pictures Releasing, it is a co-production between the United States and the United Kingdom. It features a large ensemble cast led by Leonardo DiCaprio, Brad Pitt, Margot Robbie, Emile Hirsch, Margaret Qualley, Timothy Olyphant, Austin Butler, Dakota Fanning, Bruce Dern, and Al Pacino. Set in 1969 Los Angeles, the film follows an actor and his stunt double, as they navigate the changing film industry, and features "multiple storylines in a modern fairy tale tribute to the final moments of Hollywood's golden age".

The film premiered at the Cannes Film Festival on May 21, 2019, and was theatrically released in the United States on July 26, 2019 and in the United Kingdom on August 14. It grossed $374 million worldwide, and received praise from critics for Tarantino's screenplay and direction, acting, cinematography, costume design, production values, and soundtrack. It was chosen by the National Board of Review, American Film Institute and Time magazine as one of the ten best films of the year. At the 77th Golden Globe Awards, it was nominated for five awards, winning three of them including one for Best Motion Picture – Musical or Comedy. It received ten nominations at the 92nd Academy Awards, including Best Picture, Best Director, Best Actor and Best Supporting Actor.

== Awards and nominations ==
Award (Note: Awards, festivals and organizations are in alphabetical order.)	Date of ceremony (Note: Date is linked to the article about the awards held that year, wherever possible.)	Category	Recipient(s)	Result	Ref.
Academy Awards	9 February 2020	Best Picture	David Heyman, Shannon McIntosh, and Quentin Tarantino	Nominated	
Academy Awards	9 February 2020	Best Director	Quentin Tarantino	Nominated	
Academy Awards	9 February 2020	Best Actor	Leonardo DiCaprio	Nominated	
Academy Awards	9 February 2020	Best Supporting Actor	Brad Pitt	Won	
Academy Awards	9 February 2020	Best Original Screenplay	Quentin Tarantino	Nominated	
Academy Awards	9 February 2020	Best Cinematography	Robert Richardson	Nominated	
Academy Awards	9 February 2020	Best Costume Design	Arianne Phillips	Nominated	
Academy Awards	9 February 2020	Best Production Design	Barbara Ling and Nancy Haigh	Won	
Academy Awards	9 February 2020	Best Sound Editing	Wylie Stateman	Nominated	
Academy Awards	9 February 2020	Best Sound Mixing	Christian P. Minkler, Michael Minkler, and Mark Ulano	Nominated	
Alliance of Women Film Journalists Awards	10 January 2020	Best Picture	Once Upon a Time in Hollywood	Nominated	
Alliance of Women Film Journalists Awards	10 January 2020	Best Director	Quentin Tarantino	Nominated	
Alliance of Women Film Journalists Awards	10 January 2020	Best Original Screenplay	Quentin Tarantino	Nominated	
Alliance of Women Film Journalists Awards	10 January 2020	Best Supporting Actor	Brad Pitt	Won	
Alliance of Women Film Journalists Awards	10 January 2020	Best Cinematography	Robert Richardson	Nominated	
Alliance of Women Film Journalists Awards	10 January 2020	Best Editing	Fred Raskin	Nominated	
Alliance of Women Film Journalists Awards	10 January 2020	Best Ensemble	Victoria Thomas	Nominated	
AARP Movies for Grownups Awards	11 January 2020	Best Picture	Once Upon a Time in Hollywood	Nominated	
AARP Movies for Grownups Awards	11 January 2020	Best Supporting Actor	Brad Pitt	Nominated	
AARP Movies for Grownups Awards	11 January 2020	Best Director	Quentin Tarantino	Nominated	
AARP Movies for Grownups Awards	11 January 2020	Best Screenwriter	Quentin Tarantino	Nominated	
AARP Movies for Grownups Awards	11 January 2020	Reader's Choice	Once Upon a Time in Hollywood	Nominated	
AARP Movies for Grownups Awards	11 January 2020	Best Time Capsule	Once Upon a Time in Hollywood	Nominated	
American Cinema Editors	17 January 2020	Best Edited Feature Film – Comedy or Musical	Fred Raskin	Nominated	
American Society of Cinematographers Awards	25 January 2020	Outstanding Achievement in Cinematography in Theatrical Releases	Robert Richardson	Nominated	
American Film Institute	3 January 2020	Top 10 Films of the Year	Once Upon a Time in Hollywood	Won	
Art Directors Guild Awards	1 February 2020	Excellence in Production Design for a Period Film	Barbara Ling	Won	
Austin Film Critics Association Awards	6 January 2020	Best Film	Once Upon a Time in Hollywood	Nominated	
Austin Film Critics Association Awards	6 January 2020	Top 10 Films of the Decade	Once Upon a Time in Hollywood	Won	
Austin Film Critics Association Awards	6 January 2020	Best Director	Quentin Tarantino	Nominated	
Austin Film Critics Association Awards	6 January 2020	Best Actor	Leonardo DiCaprio	Nominated	
Austin Film Critics Association Awards	6 January 2020	Best Supporting Actor	Brad Pitt	Won	
Austin Film Critics Association Awards	6 January 2020	Best Original Screenplay	Quentin Tarantino	Nominated	
Austin Film Critics Association Awards	6 January 2020	Best Cinematography	Robert Richardson	Nominated	
Austin Film Critics Association Awards	6 January 2020	Best Ensemble	Once Upon a Time in Hollywood	Nominated	
Austin Film Critics Association Awards	6 January 2020	Best Editing	Fred Raskin	Nominated	
Austin Film Critics Association Awards	6 January 2020	Best Stunts	Once Upon a Time in Hollywood	Nominated	
AACTA Awards	3 January 2020	Best International Film	David Heyman, Shannon McIntosh, and Quentin Tarantino	Nominated	
AACTA Awards	3 January 2020	Best International Direction	Quentin Tarantino	Won	
AACTA Awards	3 January 2020	Best International Supporting Actor	Brad Pitt	Won	
AACTA Awards	3 January 2020	Best International Supporting Actress	Margot Robbie	Nominated	
AACTA Awards	3 January 2020	Best International Screenplay	Quentin Tarantino	Nominated	
Boston Society of Film Critics Awards	15 December 2019	Best Screenplay	Quentin Tarantino	Won	
Boston Society of Film Critics Awards	15 December 2019	Best Supporting Actor	Brad Pitt	Won	
Boston Society of Film Critics Awards	15 December 2019	Best Cinematography	Robert Richardson	Nominated	
Boston Society of Film Critics Awards	15 December 2019	Best Ensemble Cast	Once Upon a Time in Hollywood	Nominated	
BAFTA Awards	2 February 2020	Best Film	David Heyman, Shannon McIntosh, and Quentin Tarantino	Nominated	
BAFTA Awards	2 February 2020	Best Direction	Quentin Tarantino	Nominated	
BAFTA Awards	2 February 2020	Best Original Screenplay	Quentin Tarantino	Nominated	
BAFTA Awards	2 February 2020	Best Actor	Leonardo DiCaprio	Nominated	
BAFTA Awards	2 February 2020	Best Supporting Actor	Brad Pitt	Won	
BAFTA Awards	2 February 2020	Best Supporting Actress	Margot Robbie	Nominated	
BAFTA Awards	2 February 2020	Best Casting	Victoria Thomas	Nominated	
BAFTA Awards	2 February 2020	Best Editing	Fred Raskin	Nominated	
BAFTA Awards	2 February 2020	Best Production Design	Barbara Ling and Nancy Haigh	Nominated	
BAFTA Awards	2 February 2020	Best Costume Design	Arianne Phillips	Nominated	
Cannes Film Festival	25 May 2019	Palme d'Or	Once Upon a Time in Hollywood	Nominated	
Cannes Film Festival	25 May 2019	Palm Dog Award	Once Upon a Time in Hollywood	Won	
Casting Society of America	30 January 2020	Feature Big Budget – Drama	Victoria Thomas	Won	
Chicago Film Critics Association Awards	14 December 2019	Best Film	Once Upon a Time in Hollywood	Nominated	
Chicago Film Critics Association Awards	14 December 2019	Best Director	Quentin Tarantino	Nominated	
Chicago Film Critics Association Awards	14 December 2019	Best Original Screenplay	Quentin Tarantino	Nominated	
Chicago Film Critics Association Awards	14 December 2019	Best Supporting Actor	Brad Pitt	Won	
Chicago Film Critics Association Awards	14 December 2019	Most Promising Performer	Julia Butters	Nominated	
Chicago Film Critics Association Awards	14 December 2019	Best Cinematography	Robert Richardson	Nominated	
Chicago Film Critics Association Awards	14 December 2019	Best Art Direction	Barbara Ling and Nancy Haigh	Won	
Chicago Film Critics Association Awards	14 December 2019	Best Costume Design	Arianne Phillips	Nominated	
Chicago Film Critics Association Awards	14 December 2019	Best Editing	Fred Raskin	Nominated	
Cinema Audio Society Awards	25 January 2020	Outstanding Achievement in Sound Mixing for Motion Pictures - Live Action	Mark Ulano, Michael Minkler, Christian P. Minkler, and Kyle Rochlin	Nominated	
Costume Designers Guild Awards	28 January 2020	Excellence in Period Film	Arianne Phillips	Nominated	
Critics' Choice Awards	12 January 2020	Best Picture	Once Upon a Time in Hollywood	Won	
Critics' Choice Awards	12 January 2020	Best Director	Quentin Tarantino	Nominated	
Critics' Choice Awards	12 January 2020	Best Actor	Leonardo DiCaprio	Nominated	
Critics' Choice Awards	12 January 2020	Best Supporting Actor	Brad Pitt	Won	
Critics' Choice Awards	12 January 2020	Best Young Actor/Actress	Julia Butters	Nominated	
Critics' Choice Awards	12 January 2020	Best Cast	The cast of Once Upon a Time in Hollywood	Nominated	
Critics' Choice Awards	12 January 2020	Best Original Screenplay	Quentin Tarantino	Won	
Critics' Choice Awards	12 January 2020	Best Cinematography	Robert Richardson	Nominated	
Critics' Choice Awards	12 January 2020	Best Production Design and Set Decoration	Barbara Ling and Nancy Haigh	Won	
Critics' Choice Awards	12 January 2020	Best Editing	Fred Raskin	Nominated	
Critics' Choice Awards	12 January 2020	Best Costume Design	Arianne Phillips	Nominated	
Critics' Choice Awards	12 January 2020	Best Hair and Makeup	Once Upon a Time in Hollywood	Nominated	
Dallas-Fort Worth Film Critics Association Awards	14 December 2019	Best Film	Once Upon a Time in Hollywood	4th place	
Dallas-Fort Worth Film Critics Association Awards	14 December 2019	Best Director	Quentin Tarantino	3rd place	
Dallas-Fort Worth Film Critics Association Awards	14 December 2019	Best Actor	Leonardo DiCaprio	3rd place	
Dallas-Fort Worth Film Critics Association Awards	14 December 2019	Best Supporting Actor	Brad Pitt	Won	
Detroit Film Critics Society	9 December 2019	Best Film	Once Upon a Time in Hollywood	Nominated	
Detroit Film Critics Society	9 December 2019	Best Director	Quentin Tarantino	Nominated	
Detroit Film Critics Society	9 December 2019	Best Supporting Actor	Brad Pitt	Nominated	
Detroit Film Critics Society	9 December 2019	Best Ensemble	The cast of Once Upon a Time in Hollywood	Won	
Detroit Film Critics Society	9 December 2019	Best Screenplay	Quentin Tarantino	Nominated	
Detroit Film Critics Society	9 December 2019	Best Use of Music	Once Upon a Time in Hollywood	Won	
Directors Guild of America Awards	25 January 2020	Outstanding Directing – Feature Film	Quentin Tarantino	Nominated	
Georgia Film Critics Association Awards	10 January 2020	Best Picture	Once Upon a Time in Hollywood	Nominated	
Georgia Film Critics Association Awards	10 January 2020	Best Director	Quentin Tarantino	Nominated	
Georgia Film Critics Association Awards	10 January 2020	Best Actor	Leonardo DiCaprio	Nominated	
Georgia Film Critics Association Awards	10 January 2020	Best Supporting Actor	Brad Pitt	Nominated	
Georgia Film Critics Association Awards	10 January 2020	Best Supporting Actress	Margot Robbie	Nominated	
Georgia Film Critics Association Awards	10 January 2020	Best Original Screenplay	Quentin Tarantino	Nominated	
Georgia Film Critics Association Awards	10 January 2020	Best Cinematography	Robert Richardson	Nominated	
Georgia Film Critics Association Awards	10 January 2020	Best Production Design	Barbara Ling and Nancy Haigh	Nominated	
Georgia Film Critics Association Awards	10 January 2020	Best Ensemble	The cast of Once Upon a Time in Hollywood	Nominated	
Golden Eagle Award	January 24, 2020	Best Foreign Language Film	Once Upon a Time in Hollywood	Nominated	
Golden Globe Awards	5 January 2020	Best Motion Picture – Musical or Comedy	Once Upon a Time in Hollywood	Won	
Golden Globe Awards	5 January 2020	Best Actor in a Motion Picture – Musical or Comedy	Leonardo DiCaprio	Nominated	
Golden Globe Awards	5 January 2020	Best Supporting Actor – Motion Picture	Brad Pitt	Won	
Golden Globe Awards	5 January 2020	Best Director – Motion Picture	Quentin Tarantino	Nominated	
Golden Globe Awards	5 January 2020	Best Screenplay – Motion Picture	Quentin Tarantino	Won	
Golden Reel Awards	January 19, 2020	Outstanding Achievement in Sound Editing – Dialogue and ADR	Wylie Stateman, Lindsey Alvarez, Michael Hertlein, Leo Marcil and Zach Goheen	Nominated	
Golden Reel Awards	January 19, 2020	Outstanding Achievement in Sound Editing – Effects and Foley	Wylie Stateman, Harry Cohen, Sylvain Lasseur, Rick Owens, Gary Hecker and Kyle Rochlin	Nominated	
Golden Reel Awards	January 19, 2020	Outstanding Achievement in Sound Editing – Music Underscore	Jim Schultz	Nominated	
Golden Trailer Awards	29 May 2019	Best Teaser	Sonny, Buddha Jones	Won	
Golden Trailer Awards	29 May 2019	Best Summer Blockbuster Poster	Once Upon a Time in Hollywood	Nominated	
Grammy Awards	26 January 2020	Best Compilation Soundtrack Album for Visual Media	Various Artists	Nominated	
Grande Prêmio do Cinema Brasileiro	11 October 2020	Best Foreign Long Film	Once Upon a Time in Hollywood	Nominated	
Hollywood Film Critics Association	9 January 2020	Best Picture	Once Upon a Time in Hollywood	Nominated	
Hollywood Film Critics Association	9 January 2020	Best Actor	Leonardo DiCaprio	Nominated	
Hollywood Film Critics Association	9 January 2020	Best Supporting Actor	Brad Pitt	Nominated	
Hollywood Film Critics Association	9 January 2020	Best Supporting Actress	Margot Robbie	Nominated	
Hollywood Film Critics Association	9 January 2020	Best Male Director	Quentin Tarantino	Nominated	
Hollywood Film Critics Association	9 January 2020	Best Performance by an Actor or Actress 23 And Under	Julia Butters	Nominated	
Hollywood Film Critics Association	9 January 2020	Best Cast	The cast of Once Upon a Time in Hollywood	Nominated	
Hollywood Film Critics Association	9 January 2020	Best Blockbuster	Once Upon a Time in Hollywood	Nominated	
Hollywood Film Critics Association	9 January 2020	Best Cinematography	Robert Richardson	Nominated	
Hollywood Film Critics Association	9 January 2020	Best Costume Design	Arianne Phillips	Nominated	
Hollywood Film Critics Association	9 January 2020	Best Editing	Fred Raskin	Nominated	
Location Managers Guild Awards	24 October 2020	Outstanding Locations in a Period Film	Rick Schuler, Steve Mapel	Won	
Locarno International Film Festival	15 August 2020	Variety Piazza Grande Award	Quentin Tarantino	Nominated	
London Film Critics' Circle	30 January 2020	Best Supporting Actor	Brad Pitt	Nominated	
London Film Critics' Circle	30 January 2020	Technical Achievement Award	Barbara Ling	Won	
Los Angeles Film Critics Association	8 December 2019	Best Production Design	Barbara Ling	Won	
Make-Up Artists and Hair Stylists Guild	11 January 2020	Best Period and/or Character Make-Up	Heba Thorisdottir and Gregory Funk	Nominated	
Make-Up Artists and Hair Stylists Guild	11 January 2020	Best Period and/or Character Hair Styling	Janine Rath-Thompson and Michelle Diamantides	Nominated	
National Board of Review	3 December 2019	Best Director	Quentin Tarantino	Won	
National Board of Review	3 December 2019	Best Supporting Actor	Brad Pitt	Won	
National Board of Review	3 December 2019	Top Ten Films	Once Upon a Time in Hollywood	Won	
New York Film Critics Circle	7 January 2020	Best Screenplay	Quentin Tarantino	Won	
New York Film Critics Online	7 December 2019	Top Ten Films	Once Upon a Time in Hollywood	Won	
Online Film Critics Society	6 January 2020	Best Picture	Once Upon a Time in Hollywood	Nominated	
Online Film Critics Society	6 January 2020	Best Director	Quentin Tarantino	Nominated	
Online Film Critics Society	6 January 2020	Best Supporting Actor	Brad Pitt	Won	
Online Film Critics Society	6 January 2020	Best Supporting Actress	Margot Robbie	Nominated	
Online Film Critics Society	6 January 2020	Best Original Screenplay	Quentin Tarantino	Nominated	
Online Film Critics Society	6 January 2020	Best Editing	Fred Raskin	Nominated	
Online Film Critics Society	6 January 2020	Best Cinematography	Robert Richardson	Nominated	
People's Choice Awards	10 November 2019	Favorite Drama Movie	Once Upon a Time in Hollywood	Nominated	
People's Choice Awards	10 November 2019	Favorite Drama Movie Star	Leonardo DiCaprio	Nominated	
People's Choice Awards	10 November 2019	Favorite Drama Movie Star	Brad Pitt	Nominated	
Producers Guild of America Awards	18 January 2020	Best Theatrical Motion Picture	David Heyman, Shannon McIntosh and Quentin Tarantino	Nominated	
San Diego Film Critics Society	9 December 2019	Best Film	Once Upon a Time in Hollywood	Nominated	
San Diego Film Critics Society	9 December 2019	Best Director	Quentin Tarantino	Nominated	
San Diego Film Critics Society	9 December 2019	Best Supporting Actor	Brad Pitt (Note: Tied with Joe Pesci for The Irishman.)	Won	
San Diego Film Critics Society	9 December 2019	Best Original Screenplay	Quentin Tarantino	Nominated	
San Diego Film Critics Society	9 December 2019	Best Costume Design	Arianne Phillips	Nominated	
San Diego Film Critics Society	9 December 2019	Best Editing	Fred Raskin	Nominated	
San Diego Film Critics Society	9 December 2019	Best Production Design	Barbara Ling	Nominated	
San Diego Film Critics Society	9 December 2019	Best Use of Music	Once Upon a Time in Hollywood	Won	
San Diego Film Critics Society	9 December 2019	Best Ensemble	The cast of Once Upon a Time in Hollywood	Nominated	
San Diego Film Critics Society	9 December 2019	Breakthrough Artist	Julia Butters	Nominated	
Satellite Awards	19 December 2019	Best Motion Picture – Comedy or Musical	Once Upon a Time in Hollywood	Won	
Satellite Awards	19 December 2019	Best Achievement in Directing – Motion Picture	Quentin Tarantino	Nominated	
Satellite Awards	19 December 2019	Best Performance by an Actor in a Motion Picture – Comedy or Musical	Leonardo DiCaprio	Nominated	
Satellite Awards	19 December 2019	Best Performance by a Supporting Actor – Motion Picture	Brad Pitt	Nominated	
Satellite Awards	19 December 2019	Best Original Screenplay Writing – Motion Picture	Quentin Tarantino	Nominated	
Satellite Awards	19 December 2019	Best Art Direction and Production Design – Motion Picture	Nancy Haigh and Barbara Ling	Nominated	
Satellite Awards	19 December 2019	Best Sound (Editing and Mixing) – Motion Picture	Christian P. Minkler, Michael Minkler, Wylie Stateman, and Mark Ulano	Nominated	
Saturn Awards	26 October 2021	Best Fantasy Film	Once Upon a Time in Hollywood	Won	
Saturn Awards	26 October 2021	Best Director	Quentin Tarantino	Nominated	
Saturn Awards	26 October 2021	Best Performance by a Younger Actor	Julia Butters	Nominated	
Saturn Awards	26 October 2021	Best Writing	Quentin Tarantino	Won	
Saturn Awards	26 October 2021	Best Editing	Fred Raskin	Nominated	
Saturn Awards	26 October 2021	Best Production Design	Barbara Ling	Won	
Saturn Awards	26 October 2021	Best Costume Design	Arianne Phillips	Nominated	
Screen Actors Guild Awards	19 January 2020	Outstanding Performance by an Ensemble in a Motion Picture	Austin Butler, Julia Butters, Bruce Dern, Leonardo DiCaprio, Dakota Fanning, Emile Hirsch, Damian Lewis, Mike Moh, Timothy Olyphant, Al Pacino, Luke Perry, Brad Pitt, Margaret Qualley and Margot Robbie	Nominated	
Screen Actors Guild Awards	19 January 2020	Outstanding Performance by a Male Actor in a Leading Role in a Motion Picture	Leonardo DiCaprio	Nominated	
Screen Actors Guild Awards	19 January 2020	Outstanding Performance by a Male Actor in a Supporting Role in a Motion Picture	Brad Pitt	Won	
Screen Actors Guild Awards	19 January 2020	Outstanding Performance by a Stunt Ensemble in a Motion Picture	Once Upon a Time in Hollywood	Nominated	
Seattle Film Critics Society	2019	Best Film	Once Upon a Time in Hollywood	Nominated	
Seattle Film Critics Society	2019	Best Supporting Actor	Brad Pitt	Nominated	
Seattle Film Critics Society	2019	Best Ensemble Cast	The cast of Once Upon a Time in Hollywood	Nominated	
Seattle Film Critics Society	2019	Best Cinematography	Robert Richardson	Nominated	
Seattle Film Critics Society	2019	Best Costume Design	Arianne Phillips	Nominated	
Seattle Film Critics Society	2019	Best Film Editing	Fred Raskin	Nominated	
Seattle Film Critics Society	2019	Best Production Design	Barbara Ling and Nancy Haigh	Won	
Seattle Film Critics Society	2019	Best Youth Performance	Julia Butters	Nominated	
St. Louis Film Critics Association	15 December 2019	Best Film	Once Upon a Time in Hollywood	Won	
St. Louis Film Critics Association	15 December 2019	Best Director	Quentin Tarantino	Won	
St. Louis Film Critics Association	15 December 2019	Best Supporting Actor	Brad Pitt	Won	
St. Louis Film Critics Association	15 December 2019	Best Supporting Actress	Margot Robbie	Won	
St. Louis Film Critics Association	15 December 2019	Best Original Screenplay	Quentin Tarantino	Won	
St. Louis Film Critics Association	15 December 2019	Best Editing	Fred Raskin	Won	
St. Louis Film Critics Association	15 December 2019	Best Cinematography	Robert Richardson	Nominated	
St. Louis Film Critics Association	15 December 2019	Best Production Design	Barbara Ling	Won	
St. Louis Film Critics Association	15 December 2019	Best Soundtrack	Once Upon a Time in Hollywood	Won	
St. Louis Film Critics Association	15 December 2019	Special Merit	Once Upon a Time in Hollywood	Won	
Toronto Film Critics Association Awards	8 December 2019	Best Supporting Actor	Brad Pitt	Won	
Vancouver Film Critics Circle	16 December 2019	Best Supporting Actor	Brad Pitt	Won	
Vancouver Film Critics Circle	16 December 2019	Best Screenplay	Quentin Tarantino	Nominated	
Washington D.C. Area Film Critics Association	8 December 2019	Best Film	Once Upon a Time in Hollywood	Nominated	
Washington D.C. Area Film Critics Association	8 December 2019	Best Director	Quentin Tarantino	Nominated	
Washington D.C. Area Film Critics Association	8 December 2019	Best Actor	Leonardo DiCaprio	Nominated	
Washington D.C. Area Film Critics Association	8 December 2019	Best Supporting Actor	Brad Pitt	Won	
Washington D.C. Area Film Critics Association	8 December 2019	Best Ensemble	The cast of Once Upon a Time in Hollywood	Nominated	
Washington D.C. Area Film Critics Association	8 December 2019	Best Breakthrough Performance	Julia Butters	Nominated	
Washington D.C. Area Film Critics Association	8 December 2019	Best Original Screenplay	Quentin Tarantino	Nominated	
Washington D.C. Area Film Critics Association	8 December 2019	Best Art Direction	Barbara Ling and Nancy Haigh	Won	
Washington D.C. Area Film Critics Association	8 December 2019	Best Cinematography	Robert Richardson	Nominated	
Washington D.C. Area Film Critics Association	8 December 2019	Best Editing	Fred Raskin	Nominated	

== See also ==
- 2019 in film
- Once Upon a Time in Hollywood (novel)
