= The Harder They Fall (2021 film) =

2021 film by Jeymes Samuel

- Promotional release poster
- Directed by: Jeymes Samuel
- Screenplay by: Jeymes Samuel; Boaz Yakin
- Story by: Jeymes Samuel
- Produced by: Lawrence Bender; Shawn Corey Carter; James Lassiter; Jeymes Samuel
- Starring: Jonathan Majors; Idris Elba; Zazie Beetz; Regina King; Delroy Lindo; Lakeith Stanfield; RJ Cyler; Danielle Deadwyler; Edi Gathegi; Deon Cole
- Cinematography: Mihai Mălaimare Jr.
- Edited by: Tom Eagles
- Music by: Jeymes Samuel
- Production company: Overbrook Entertainment
- Distributed by: Netflix
- Release dates: October 6, 2021 (BFI); October 22, 2021 (United States)
- Running time: 139 minutes
- Country: United States
- Language: English
- Box office: $8,292

The Harder They Fall is a 2021 American Western film directed by Jeymes Samuel (in his feature directorial debut), who co-wrote the screenplay with Boaz Yakin. The film stars Jonathan Majors, Idris Elba, Zazie Beetz, Regina King, Delroy Lindo, Lakeith Stanfield, RJ Cyler, Danielle Deadwyler, Edi Gathegi, and Deon Cole. It is one of few Westerns whose principal cast members are all black. Its characters are based on real cowboys, lawmen, and outlaws of the nineteenth-century American West.

The Harder They Fall premiered at the BFI London Film Festival on October 6, 2021. It received a limited release on October 22, 2021, prior to streaming on Netflix on November 3.

== Plot ==
Eleven-year-old Nat Love is eating dinner with his parents when Rufus Buck and his associate Cortez arrive. Nat's father begs Buck to spare his wife and son and asks Buck for forgiveness, but Buck shoots and kills both of Nat's parents and then carves a cross into his forehead.

Twenty years later, Love finds and kills Cortez. Meanwhile, his partners, sharpshooter Bill Pickett and quick draw Jim Beckwourth, ambush the Crimson Hood gang and steal their haul from a recent bank robbery. The lone survivor tells them the $25,000 they have stolen belongs to Buck. Love travels to meet his former lover Mary Fields, who runs a chain of saloons. Pickett brings news of the heist to Love.

Buck's gang, led by Trudy Smith and Cherokee Bill, forcefully free Buck from a train leaving from Yuma Territorial Prison. They reveal Buck has been pardoned, and they have been paid to kill the corrupt U.S. Army soldiers guarding the prison car. After slaughtering the soldiers, Buck and his gang arrive in their former stronghold of Redwood City, now run by Buck's associate, Sheriff Wiley Escoe. Learning that Escoe has used the position to profit at the expense of the town, Buck brutally pistol whips him and orders him to leave town. Buck gathers the townspeople and after killing a naysayer, demands that they raise $50,000 to save Redwood, threatening to kill and burn the property of any who resist.

U.S. Marshal Bass Reeves arrests Love after a standoff in a saloon. However, Reeves reveals to Love that Buck has been released, and he offers him a chance for revenge. Love's gang, accompanied by Fields and her friend and enforcer, Cuffee, arrive and insist on joining. They encounter Escoe, who tells them Buck has returned to Redwood. Fields volunteers to scout Redwood under the cover of offering to buy Smith's saloon. Love proposes marriage to Fields, but she turns him down.

When Fields arrives in Redwood, Smith takes her prisoner and beats her. Love's gang arrives, and Love joins Fields in captivity to save her life. Smith has Love beaten, and he in turn asks Buck to release Fields. Buck demands Love return the money he stole plus $10,000 as 'interest', requiring him to rob a bank in a white town. Love and Cuffee rob the bank without killing anyone and escape. However, the group recognizes that Buck is unlikely to release Fields willingly, so they devise a plan to rig a decoy wagon with dynamite.

They enter Redwood and the decoy wagon is destroyed, killing some of Buck's gang. Love prepares to hand over the money, but is interrupted by Cherokee Bill preparing to shoot him in the back. Beckwourth intervenes, challenging Bill to a quick draw showdown. Bill shoots and kills Beckwourth before he can finish counting down, causing a gunfight to erupt. Love, Reeves, Pickett, and Cuffee kill most of Buck's gang, and the money is destroyed in another explosion. Escoe infiltrates Buck's house but is killed by Buck, while Pickett and Love are wounded.

Fields is freed by Cuffee and pursues Smith, who she defeats in a hand-to-hand fight. Pickett is shot in the back by Bill, who is subsequently killed by Cuffee in a quick draw confrontation. Love finds Buck, who is unwilling to defend himself. Buck reveals that they are half-brothers, and that their father was once an abusive outlaw who killed his first wife (Buck's mother) when she tried to protect her son. After leaving Buck, their father eventually repented and married another woman and had Nat. He claims that driving Love to outlawry was his true act of revenge against their father. Love reluctantly kills Buck and closes his eyes out of respect.

Love and his companions bury Pickett and Beckwourth, alongside another grave marked "Nat Love" (implied to be the resting place of Rufus Buck), as Reeves states that the law will now consider Nat to be "dead." Cuffee joins Reeves as a deputy. Cuffee and Reeves ride off in one direction and Love and Fields in another. A woman holding a bowler hat looks at them from a distance.

== Cast ==
- Jonathan Majors as Nat Love
  - Chase Dillon as young Nat Love
- Idris Elba as Rufus Buck
- Zazie Beetz as Stagecoach Mary
- Regina King as Trudy Smith
- Delroy Lindo as Bass Reeves
- Lakeith Stanfield as Cherokee Bill
- RJ Cyler as Jim Beckwourth
- Danielle Deadwyler as Cuffee. The character was inspired by Cathay Williams.
- Edi Gathegi as Bill Pickett
- Deon Cole as Wiley Escoe. The character refers to a same-named Deputy U.S. Marshal in the Indian Territory during the 1890s. He was of black and Muscogee descent.
- Damon Wayans Jr. as Monroe Grimes
- DeWanda Wise as Eleanor Love, Nat Love’s Mother
- Michael Beach as Nat Love’s Father
- Julio Cesar Cedillo as Cortez
- Mark "Rhino" Smith as Carson

== Production ==
The film's original working title was The Notorious Nine. The film was announced in July 2019, when Jonathan Majors was cast to star in it. Musician Jeymes Samuel co-wrote and directed the film. Idris Elba would join in November, and Jay-Z, who would produce the film, was announced to be writing original music for the film. By September 2020, Zazie Beetz, Lakeith Stanfield, Delroy Lindo and Regina King would be among new cast members added to the film.

Filming had been scheduled to begin in March 2020 in Santa Fe, New Mexico, but was delayed as a result of the COVID-19 pandemic. Cynthia Erivo, Wesley Snipes and Sterling K. Brown, who were initially cast, had to exit due to the delays caused by the pandemic. Filming commenced in September 2020, but was paused on October 15 after a background actor tested positive for COVID-19.

== Release ==
The film had its world premiere at the BFI London Film Festival on October 6, 2021. It also screened at the Montclair Film Festival on October 22, 2021. It received a limited release on October 22, 2021, prior to streaming on Netflix on November 3.

== Music ==
An original soundtrack and a film score composed by Jeymes Samuel, were released on October 29, 2021 and January 14, 2022, respectively.

== Reception ==
On review aggregator Rotten Tomatoes, 88% of 181 critics gave the film a positive review, with an average rating of 7.5/10. The website's critics consensus reads: "It isn't as bold and fearless as its characters, but The Harder They Fall fills its well-worn template with style, energy, and a fantastic cast." On Metacritic, the film has a weighted average score of 68 out of 100 based on 41 critics, indicating "generally favorable" reviews.

Filmmaker Baz Luhrmann praised Jeymes Samuel's direction, saying "He has taken the legacy of the American cowboy, a quarter of whom historically were Black, and flipped it into a grand entertainment, so that his point is made with broad appeal. Samuel has collected the fantastical stories of icons like Stagecoach Mary and Rufus Buck, who may never have crossed paths, and translated their spirit through an original, heightened language."

== Accolades ==
Award	Date of ceremony	Category	Recipient(s)	Result	Ref.
African-American Film Critics Association	January 19, 2022	Best Picture	The Harder They Fall	Won	
African-American Film Critics Association	January 19, 2022	Best Director	Jeymes Samuel	Won	
African-American Film Critics Association	January 19, 2022	Best Ensemble	Jonathan Majors, Idris Elba, Zazie Beetz, Regina King, Delroy Lindo, Lakeith Stanfield, RJ Cyler, Danielle Deadwyler, Edi Gathegi, Deon Cole	Won	
African-American Film Critics Association	January 19, 2022	Best Music	"Guns Go Bang" (Jay-Z, Kid Cudi and Jeymes Samuel)	Won	
Alliance of Women Film Journalists	January, 2022	Best Ensemble Cast	Victoria Thomas	Nominated	
Austin Film Critics Association	January 11, 2022	Best Ensemble	Jonathan Majors, Idris Elba, Zazie Beetz, Regina King, Delroy Lindo, Lakeith Stanfield, RJ Cyler, Danielle Deadwyler, Edi Gathegi, Deon Cole	Nominated	
British Academy Film Awards	March 13, 2022	Outstanding Debut by a British Writer, Director or Producer	Jeymes Samuel	Won	
Black Reel Awards	February 27, 2022	Outstanding Film	The Harder They Fall	Nominated	
Black Reel Awards	February 27, 2022	Outstanding Director	Jeymes Samuel	Won	
Black Reel Awards	February 27, 2022	Outstanding Actor	Jonathan Majors	Nominated	
Black Reel Awards	February 27, 2022	Outstanding Actress	Zazie Beetz	Nominated	
Black Reel Awards	February 27, 2022	Outstanding Supporting Actor	LaKeith Stanfield	Nominated	
Black Reel Awards	February 27, 2022	Outstanding Supporting Actor	Idris Elba	Nominated	
Black Reel Awards	February 27, 2022	Outstanding Supporting Actress	Regina King	Nominated	
Black Reel Awards	February 27, 2022	Outstanding Breakthrough Performance, Male	Deon Cole	Nominated	
Black Reel Awards	February 27, 2022	Outstanding Breakthrough Performance, Male	Edi Gathegi	Nominated	
Black Reel Awards	February 27, 2022	Outstanding Breakthrough Performance, Female	Danielle Deadwyler	Nominated	
Black Reel Awards	February 27, 2022	Outstanding Ensemble, Casting Director	Victoria Thomas	Won	
Black Reel Awards	February 27, 2022	Outstanding Screenplay, Adapted or Original	Jeymes Samuel and Boaz Yakin	Nominated	
Black Reel Awards	February 27, 2022	Outstanding Emerging Director	Jeymes Samuel	Won	
Black Reel Awards	February 27, 2022	Outstanding Original Score	Jeymes Samuel	Won	
Black Reel Awards	February 27, 2022	Outstanding Editing	Tom Eagles	Won	
Black Reel Awards	February 27, 2022	Outstanding Cinematography	Mihai Malaimare Jr.	Nominated	
Black Reel Awards	February 27, 2022	Outstanding Costume Design	Antoinette Messam	Won	
Black Reel Awards	February 27, 2022	Outstanding Production Design	Martin Whist	Nominated	
Black Reel Awards	February 27, 2022	Outstanding Original Song	"Guns Go Bang" (Jay-Z, Kid Cudi and Jeymes Samuel)	Nominated	
Black Reel Awards	February 27, 2022	Outstanding Original Song	"The Harder They Fall" (Jay-Z, Koffee and Jeymes Samuel)	Nominated	
Celebration of Black Cinema and Television	December 4, 2021	Ensemble Award	Jonathan Majors, Idris Elba, Zazie Beetz, Regina King, Delroy Lindo, Lakeith Stanfield, RJ Cyler, Danielle Deadwyler, Edi Gathegi, Deon Cole	Won	
Critics' Choice Movie Awards	March 13, 2022	Best Acting Ensemble	Jonathan Majors, Idris Elba, Zazie Beetz, Regina King, Delroy Lindo, Lakeith Stanfield, RJ Cyler, Danielle Deadwyler, Edi Gathegi, Deon Cole	Nominated	
Critics' Choice Movie Awards	March 13, 2022	Best Song	"Guns Go Bang" (Jay-Z, Kid Cudi and Jeymes Samuel)	Nominated	
Critics' Choice Super Awards	March 17, 2022	Best Action Movie	The Harder They Fall	Nominated	
Critics' Choice Super Awards	March 17, 2022	Best Actor in an Action Movie	Jonathan Majors	Nominated	
Critics' Choice Super Awards	March 17, 2022	Best Actress in an Action Movie	Regina King	Nominated	
Critics' Choice Super Awards	March 17, 2022	Best Villain in a Movie	Idris Elba	Nominated	
Denver Film Festival	November 4, 2021	Best Original Score	Jeymes Samuel	Nominated	
Denver Film Festival	November 4, 2021	Best Original Song	"Guns Go Bang" (Jay-Z, Kid Cudi and Jeymes Samuel)	Nominated	
Detroit Film Critics Society	December 6, 2021	Best Ensemble	Jonathan Majors, Idris Elba, Zazie Beetz, Regina King, Delroy Lindo, Lakeith Stanfield, RJ Cyler, Danielle Deadwyler, Edi Gathegi, Deon Cole	Nominated	
Detroit Film Critics Society	December 6, 2021	Best Screenplay	Jeymes Samuel and Boaz Yakin	Nominated	
Georgia Film Critics Association	January 14, 2022	Best Original Score	Jeymes Samuel	Nominated	
Georgia Film Critics Association	January 14, 2022	Best Original Song	"Guns Go Bang" (Jay-Z, Kid Cudi and Jeymes Samuel)	Nominated	
Gotham Awards	November 29, 2021	Ensemble Tribute Award	Jonathan Majors, Idris Elba, Zazie Beetz, Regina King, Delroy Lindo, Lakeith Stanfield, RJ Cyler, Danielle Deadwyler, Edi Gathegi, Deon Cole	Won	
Hollywood Critics Association Awards	February 28, 2022	Best Action Film	The Harder They Fall	Won	
Hollywood Critics Association Awards	February 28, 2022	Best Cast Ensemble	Jonathan Majors, Idris Elba, Zazie Beetz, Regina King, Delroy Lindo, Lakeith Stanfield, RJ Cyler, Danielle Deadwyler, Edi Gathegi, Deon Cole	Nominated	
Hollywood Music in Media Awards	November 17, 2021	Best Original Song in a Feature Film	"Guns Go Bang" (Jay-Z, Kid Cudi and Jeymes Samuel)	Nominated	
Houston Film Critics Society	February 19, 2022	Best Original Score	Jeymes Samuel	Nominated	
Houston Film Critics Society	February 19, 2022	Best Original Song	"Guns Go Bang" (Jay-Z, Kid Cudi and Jeymes Samuel)	Nominated	
NAACP Image Awards	February 26, 2022	Outstanding Motion Picture	The Harder They Fall	Won	
NAACP Image Awards	February 26, 2022	Outstanding Actor in a Motion Picture	Jonathan Majors	Nominated	
NAACP Image Awards	February 26, 2022	Outstanding Supporting Actor in a Motion Picture	Delroy Lindo	Nominated	
NAACP Image Awards	February 26, 2022	Outstanding Supporting Actor in a Motion Picture	Idris Elba	Nominated	
NAACP Image Awards	February 26, 2022	Outstanding Supporting Actor in a Motion Picture	LaKeith Stanfield	Nominated	
NAACP Image Awards	February 26, 2022	Outstanding Supporting Actress in a Motion Picture	Danielle Deadwyler	Nominated	
NAACP Image Awards	February 26, 2022	Outstanding Supporting Actress in a Motion Picture	Regina King	Won	
NAACP Image Awards	February 26, 2022	Outstanding Ensemble Cast in a Motion Picture	Jonathan Majors, Idris Elba, Zazie Beetz, Regina King, Delroy Lindo, Lakeith Stanfield, RJ Cyler, Danielle Deadwyler, Edi Gathegi, Deon Cole	Won	
NAACP Image Awards	February 26, 2022	Outstanding Breakthrough Creative in a Motion Picture	Jeymes Samuel	Won	
NAACP Image Awards	February 26, 2022	Outstanding Soundtrack/Compilation Album	The Harder They Fall Soundtrack (Jay-Z and Jeymes Samuel)	Won	
National Board of Review Awards	December 2, 2021	Best Cast	Jonathan Majors, Idris Elba, Zazie Beetz, Regina King, Delroy Lindo, Lakeith Stanfield, RJ Cyler, Danielle Deadwyler, Edi Gathegi, Deon Cole	Won	
San Diego Film Critics Society	January 10, 2022	Best Performance by an Ensemble	Jonathan Majors, Idris Elba, Zazie Beetz, Regina King, Delroy Lindo, Lakeith Stanfield, RJ Cyler, Danielle Deadwyler, Edi Gathegi, Deon Cole	Nominated	
San Diego Film Critics Society	January 10, 2022	Best Costumes	Antoinette Messam	Nominated	
Satellite Awards	April 2, 2022	Best Original Score	Jeymes Samuel	Nominated	
Satellite Awards	April 2, 2022	Best Sound (Editing & Mixing)	Ron Bartlett, Clint Bennett, Doug Hemphill, Richard King, Anthony Ortiz	Nominated	
Seattle Film Critics Society	January 17, 2022	Best Villain	Idris Elba	Nominated	
Washington D.C. Area Film Critics Association Awards	December 6, 2021	Best Ensemble	Jonathan Majors, Idris Elba, Zazie Beetz, Regina King, Delroy Lindo, Lakeith Stanfield, RJ Cyler, Danielle Deadwyler, Edi Gathegi, Deon Cole	Nominated	
Women Film Critics Circle	December 11, 2021	Invisible Woman Award	Danielle Deadwyler	Won	
Women Film Critics Circle	December 11, 2021	Best Equality of the Sexes	The Harder They Fall	Nominated	
