= Jeymes Samuel =

British singer-songwriter, producer, and filmmaker (born 1979)

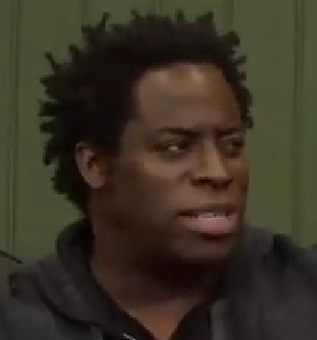
- Samuel in 2024
- Born: 27 July 1979 (age 47); London, England
- Occupations: Singer; songwriter; record producer; filmmaker; director; film composer; actor
- Years active: 1999–present
- Works: Discography; production; filmography
- Relatives: Seal (brother)
- Awards: Full list
- Musical career
- Genres: Alternative hip hop; alternative R&B; alternative rock; folk rock; pop; electronica
- Instruments: Vocals; guitar; piano
- Labels: Kilburn Lane; Giant Step; Little League
- Website: www.thebullitts.com

Jeymes Samuel (born 27 July 1979), also known by his stage name The Bullitts, is a British filmmaker, singer-songwriter, music producer and composer. He won the 2021 BAFTA Award for Outstanding Debut by a British Writer, Director or Producer for his feature film directorial debut The Harder They Fall, released in 2021.

== Life and career ==
Samuel initially embarked on a career in filmmaking, having shot his first reels at the age of eight. However he began making music at the age of 13. In the year 2000, he released "When It Rains", his debut single in the form of a 12", under his real name on Giant Step Records. On 1 January 2002, in conjunction with Little League Productions, he released Urban Folk Music: The Prequel. That same year, he contributed background vocals on the song "The Proud", from American rapper Talib Kweli's debut album, Quality. In 2004, he wrote "Serenade", for Icelandic singer Emilíana Torrini's 2005 album Fisherman's Woman. Little League Productions later debuted Samuel's new moniker and released his single "The Bullitts Theme" in 2007.

In 2009, Samuel wrote and co-produced three songs on fellow British singer Mr Hudson's album Straight No Chaser, namely "Straight No Chaser", "Everything Is Broken" (featuring Kid Cudi) and "Time”. In March 2010, he joined a choir called The Purple, The People, The Plastic Eating People. The choir contributed background vocals on the songs "Some Kind of Nature" (featuring Lou Reed) and "Pirate Jet", from the third album by Gorillaz, Plastic Beach (2010).

In 2010, Samuel began uploading "FlixTapes" to YouTube under the pseudonym The Bullitts, named in honour of the 1968 film Bullitt; this was a series of videos in which he added new vocals to his favourite movie and television themes. The first episode, titled "Tales of the Unexpected", was released on 14 November 2010.

"Close Your Eyes", the lead single from his then-upcoming album, premiered in April 2011. The single features narration by American actress Lucy Liu and a verse from American rapper Jay Electronica. Its music video is a re-imagining of the Salvador Dalí and Luis Buñuel film, Un Chien Andalou. In May 2011, the album's second single, "Landspeeder", was released. "Landspeeder" was later included on the original motion picture soundtrack to the British 2011 slasher film Demons Never Die.

He issued "Weirdo" in July 2011, a short piece starring Jesse Williams. In it, two young lovers in paper-bag masks spend a day on the streets of London before robbing a newsagents during a declaration of love. For the song "Run and Hide", by Jay Electronica, he directed a film noir in Paris, based around the actress Elisa Lasowski. Samuel played at The Big Chill music festival on 6 August 2011; he was joined onstage by Liu, Electronica and English actor Idris Elba.

The album's third single, titled "Supercool", was premiered on Lowe's show on 4 October 2011. Its accompanying music video featured he dressed as a homeless individual being harassed by someone filming him against his will; during this he bumps into actress Rosario Dawson, and the pair end up having a dance off on the streets of Soho. In 2011, he wrote "Wonderful Life", alongside Estelle Swaray, for Swaray's third album All of Me (2012). In late 2012, he was handpicked by Baz Luhrmann and Jay-Z to be Executive Music Consultant for the soundtrack to the film The Great Gatsby (2013).

In early 2013, Samuel wrote, directed and scored the short film titled They Die By Dawn, with an all star cast that includes Michael K. Williams, Erykah Badu, Isaiah Washington, Jesse Williams and Rosario Dawson. The film is set in Langston, Oklahoma in 1890 and is a gun-slinging, black cowboy western. Samuel's first album under the moniker The Bullitts, is titled They Die By Dawn & Other Short Stories... and was released on 9 July 2013. The album was produced entirely by himself and features guest appearances from Jay Electronica, Lucy Liu, Mos Def, Rosario Dawson, Doxi Jones and Tori Amos.

In 2021, he directed and co-wrote The Harder They Fall, a revisionist western starring Jonathan Majors, Zazie Beetz, and RJ Cyler. The film, which was initially titled The Notorious Nine, was in development for several years.

In 2022, Netflix announced that Samuel will direct the feature film adaptation of Irredeemable and Incorruptible. In March 2022, it was announced American musician Kid Cudi would direct a film titled Teddy, which would be executive produced by Samuel, alongside Jay-Z and James Lassiter.

== Artistry ==
Samuel is on record saying "As a musician, I've always regarded myself as, at root, a folk musician. My voice and my acoustic guitar." There is a cinematic element to his music and he has created a short film to accompany most of his releases.

In a November 2021 interview, Samuel said "My influences musically go back further than time itself. If I'm outside the house, I'm listening to Wu-Tang Clan and Mobb Deep and Jay-Z and Nas. If I'm inside the house, I'm listening to Crosby, Stills and Nash, Joni Mitchell, Jackson Browne. So my brain is always cooking everything together in both film and music and drawing from all of my influences, and bringing them into the present."

== Personal life ==
Samuel's older brother is Henry Samuel, better known as Seal. His mother, Adebisi Ogundeji, is Nigerian, and his father, Francis Samuel, is Afro-Brazilian.

== Discography ==
The Bullitts discography
- Studio albums: 1
- Extended plays: 1
- Soundtrack albums: 3
- Singles: 9
- Music videos: 7
- Mixtapes: 1

The discography of The Bullitts consists of one studio album, three soundtrack album, one extended play (EP), one mixtape and nine singles.

=== Studio albums ===
List of albums, with selected information
Title	Album details
They Die By Dawn & Other Short Stories...	Released: 9 July 2013; Label: Kilburn Lane Music; Formats: CD, digital download

=== Soundtrack albums ===
List of soundtracks, with selected information
Title	Album details
The Harder They Fall (Original Score) (Note: as Jeymes Samuel)	Released: 14 January 2022; Label: Geneva Club, Roc Nation; Formats: CD, digital download
The Book of Clarence (Original Motion Picture Score)	Released: 11 January 2024; Label: Legendary, Milan; Formats: CD, digital download
The Book of Clarence (The Motion Picture Soundtrack)	Released: 12 January 2024; Label: Geneva Club, Roc Nation; Formats: CD, digital download

=== EPs ===
List of extended plays, with selected information
Title	Album details
Supercool	Released: 8 April 2012; Label: The Outfit Agency Limited, Salvador, Shamrock Solutions; Formats: CD, digital download

=== Mixtapes ===
List of mixtapes, with selected information
Title	Album details
Urban Folk Music: The Prequel	Released: 1 January 2002 (UK); Label: Little League Productions; Formats: CD, digital download

=== Singles ===
List of singles as lead artist, with selected chart positions, showing year released and album name
Title	Year	Album
"When It Rains"	2000	Non-album single
"Who Write the Songs" (featuring Canibus)	2003	Urban Folk Music: The Prequel
"Baby Don't Cry" (featuring Kool G Rap)	2003	Urban Folk Music: The Prequel
"The Myspace Song"	2006	Non-album singles
"The Bullitts Theme"	2007	Non-album singles
"Close Your Eyes" (featuring Lucy Liu and Jay Electronica)	2011	They Die By Dawn & Other Short Stories...
"Landspeeder"	2011	They Die By Dawn & Other Short Stories...
"Supercool"	2012	They Die By Dawn & Other Short Stories...
"World Inside Your Rainbow"	2012	They Die By Dawn & Other Short Stories...

=== Guest appearances ===
List of non-single guest appearances, with other performing artists, showing year released and album name
Title	Year	Album	Artist(s)
"When It Rains (Restless Soul Mix)"	2001	Sessions: Volume One	Ron Trent, Felix Hopkins
"Who Write the Songs"	2003	Late Night Tales: Sly & Robbie	Sly & Robbie, Canibus
"Too Much Drama"	2004	Undercover Cuts	Brooklyn B.L.E.S.S.
"Democracy Leaders"	2006	Fight the Power	—N/a
"Striptease"	2006	Yam Who Revue	Yam Who?
"Bullitts Theme"	2007	Walk Tall, Kick Ass, Love Music	—N/a
"Bulletproof"	2007	Help George Tabb! Vol. 1	—N/a
"Fade Away"	2009	Loss 4 Wordz	Scratch
"Run and Hide"	2020	Act II: Patents of Nobility (The Turn)	Jay Electronica
"No Turning Around"	2021	The Harder They Fall (The Motion Picture Soundtrack)	—N/a

== Production discography ==
List of production (songwriting and arrangement) and sole songwriting credits (excluding guest appearances, interpolations, and samples)
Track(s)	Year	Credit	Artist(s)	Album
12. "Serenade"	2005	Producer, songwriter	Emilíana Torrini	Fisherman's Woman
08. "Bullitts Theme"	2007	Producer, songwriter	Various artists	Walk Tall, Kick Ass, Love Music
04. "Straight No Chaser"	2009	Producer, songwriter	Mr Hudson	Straight No Chaser
11. "Everything Is Broken"; (featuring Kid Cudi)	2009	Producer, songwriter	Mr Hudson	Straight No Chaser
13. "Time"	2009	Songwriter	Mr Hudson	Straight No Chaser
08. "Mr. Grin"	2011	Producer, songwriter	The Feeling	Together We Were Made
10. "Wonderful Life"; (co-produced by Wonda)	2012	Producer, songwriter	Estelle	All of Me
All tracks	2013	Producer, songwriter	The Bullitts	They Die By Dawn & Other Short Stories...
06. "Dinner at Tiffany's"; (featuring Charlotte Gainsbourg)	2020	Producer, songwriter	Jay Electronica	Act II: The Patents of Nobility (The Turn)
16. "10,000 Lotus Petals"	2020	Producer, songwriter	Jay Electronica	Act II: The Patents of Nobility (The Turn)
All tracks	2021	Producer, songwriter	Various artists	The Harder They Fall (The Motion Picture Soundtrack)
All tracks	2024	Producer, songwriter	Jeymes Samuel	The Book of Clarence (Original Motion Picture Score)
All tracks	2024	Producer, songwriter	Jeymes Samuel	The Book of Clarence (The Motion Picture Soundtrack)

== Filmography ==
=== Films ===
Title	Year	Credited as				Studio	Notes
Title	Year	Writer	Director	Producer	Composer	Studio	Notes
They Die by Dawn	2013	Yes	Yes	Yes	Yes	Film Village Corporation	Short film; also actor
The Great Gatsby	2013	No	No	No	Yes	Warner Bros. Pictures / Village Roadshow Pictures / Red Wagon Entertainment	Executive music consultant
JAY-Z: Legacy	2017	Yes	Yes	Yes	No	Little Minx Films	Short film
Arctic Dogs	2019	No	No	No	Yes	AMBI Media Group / AIC Studios / Assemblage Entertainment / Entertainment Studios Motion Pictures	Executive music producer
The Harder They Fall	2021	Yes	Yes	Yes	Yes	Netflix / Overbrook Entertainment	Feature film debut
The Book of Clarence	2023	Yes	Yes	Yes	Yes	TriStar Pictures / Legendary Pictures / Westbrook Studios	
Teddy	TBD	No	No	Yes	Yes	Netflix / Bron Studios / Mad Solar	

=== Music videos ===
As lead artist

List of music videos as lead artist, showing year released and directors
Title	Year	Director(s)
"Close Your Eyes" (featuring Lucy Liu and Jay Electronica)	2010	Jeymes Samuel
"Weirdo"	2011	Jeymes Samuel
"Landspeeder"	2011	David S. Blanco and Matt Law
"Those Silly Names"	2011	Jeymes Samuel
"Supercool"	2012	Jeymes Samuel
"World Inside Your Rainbow"	2012	Jeymes Samuel

As featured artist

List of music videos as a featured artist, showing year released and directors
Title	Year	Director(s)
"Run and Hide" (Jay Electronica featuring The Bullitts)	2011	Jeymes Samuel

== Awards and nominations ==
Award	Year	Work/Recipient(s)	Category	Result	Ref.
African-American Film Critics Association	2022	The Harder They Fall	Best Picture	Won	
African-American Film Critics Association	2022	The Harder They Fall	Best Director	Won	
African-American Film Critics Association	2022	The Harder They Fall	Best Ensemble	Won	
African-American Film Critics Association	2022	The Harder They Fall (The Motion Picture Soundtrack) (with Jay-Z and Kid Cudi)	Best Music	Won	
British Academy Film Awards	2022	The Harder They Fall	Outstanding Debut by a British Writer, Director or Producer	Won	
Black Reel Awards	2022	The Harder They Fall	Outstanding Film	Nominated	
Black Reel Awards	2022	The Harder They Fall	Outstanding Director	Won	
Black Reel Awards	2022	The Harder They Fall	Outstanding Screenplay, Adapted or Original	Nominated	
Black Reel Awards	2022	The Harder They Fall	Outstanding Emerging Director	Won	
Black Reel Awards	2022	The Harder They Fall	Outstanding Original Score	Won	
Black Reel Awards	2022	"Guns Go Bang" (with Jay-Z and Kid Cudi)	Outstanding Original Song	Nominated	
Black Reel Awards	2022	"The Harder They Fall" (with Jay-Z and Koffee)	Outstanding Original Song	Nominated	
Critics' Choice Movie Awards	2022	"Guns Go Bang" (with Jay-Z and Kid Cudi)	Best Song	Nominated	
Critics' Choice Super Awards	2022	The Harder They Fall	Best Action Movie	Nominated	
Denver Film Festival	2021	The Harder They Fall	Best Original Score	Nominated	
Denver Film Festival	2021	"Guns Go Bang" (with Jay-Z and Kid Cudi)	Best Original Song	Nominated	
Detroit Film Critics Society	2021	The Harder They Fall	Best Screenplay	Nominated	
Georgia Film Critics Association	2022	The Harder They Fall	Best Original Score	Nominated	
Georgia Film Critics Association	2022	"Guns Go Bang" (with Jay-Z and Kid Cudi)	Best Original Song	Nominated	
Hollywood Critics Association Awards	2022	The Harder They Fall	Best Action Film	Won	
Hollywood Music in Media Awards	2021	"Guns Go Bang" (with Jay-Z and Kid Cudi)	Best Original Song in a Feature Film	Nominated	
Houston Film Critics Society	2022	The Harder They Fall	Best Original Score	Nominated	
Houston Film Critics Society	2022	"Guns Go Bang" (with Jay-Z and Kid Cudi)	Best Original Song	Nominated	
NAACP Image Awards	2022	The Harder They Fall	Outstanding Motion Picture	Won	
NAACP Image Awards	2022	The Harder They Fall	Outstanding Breakthrough Creative (Motion Picture)	Won	
NAACP Image Awards	2022	The Harder They Fall (The Motion Picture Soundtrack) (with Jay-Z and Kid Cudi)	Outstanding Soundtrack/Compilation Album	Won	
Satellite Awards	2022	The Harder They Fall	Best Original Score	Nominated	
