= LaKeith Stanfield =

American actor (born 1991)

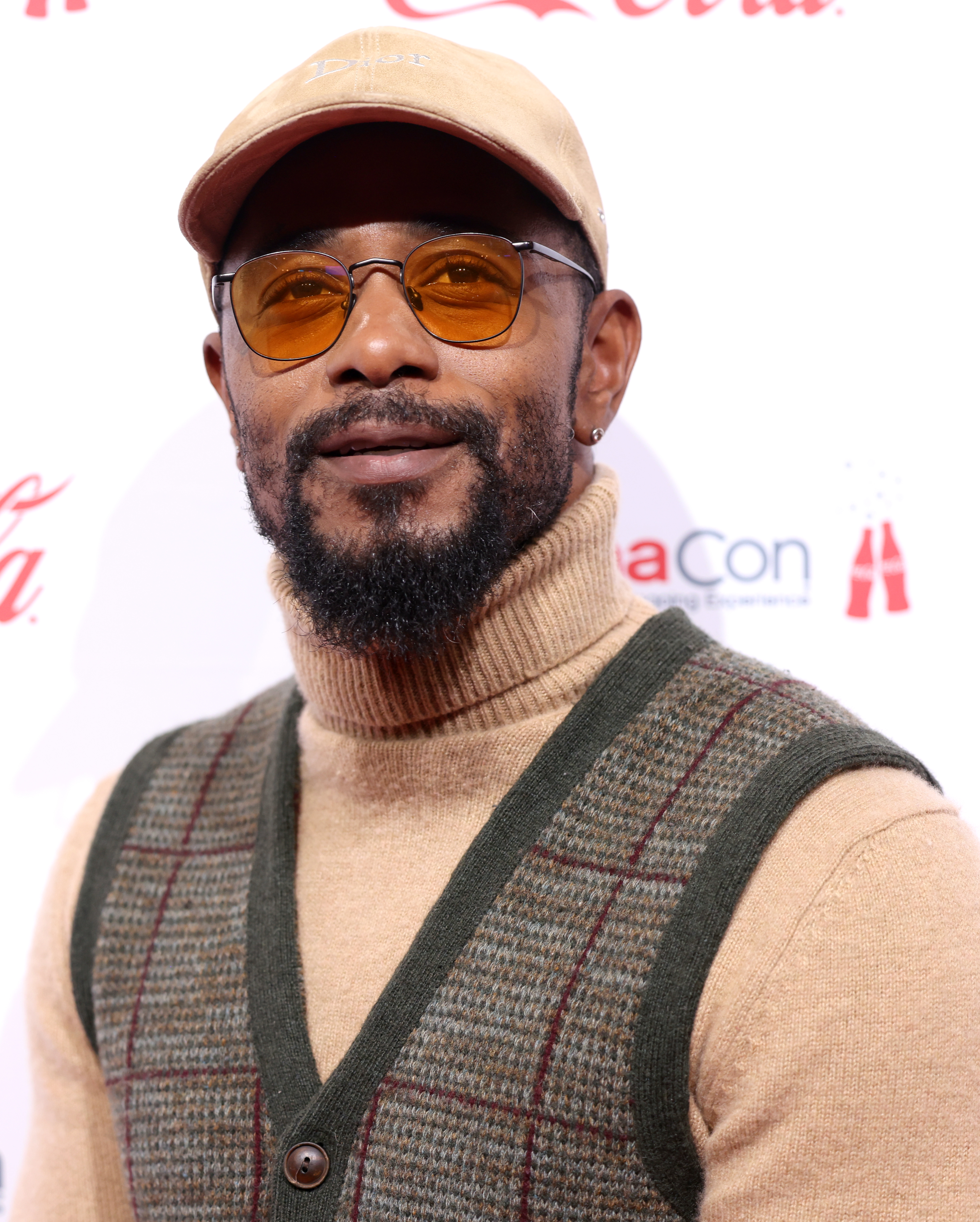
- Stanfield in 2026
- Born: LaKeith Lee Stanfield; August 12, 1991 (age 35); San Bernardino, California, U.S.
- Other name: Keith Stanfield
- Occupations: Actor; musician
- Years active: 2008–present
- Spouse: Kasmere Trice (m. 2023)
- Children: 3

LaKeith Lee Stanfield (born August 12, 1991) is an American actor and musician. He made his feature film debut in Short Term 12 (2013), for which he was nominated for an Independent Spirit Award. He received further recognition for his roles in the films Get Out (2017), Sorry to Bother You (2018), Uncut Gems (2019), Knives Out (2019), and Judas and the Black Messiah (2021), the lattermost of which earned him a nomination for the Academy Award for Best Supporting Actor.

Stanfield has also appeared in the films Selma (2014), Dope (2015), Straight Outta Compton (2015), Crown Heights (2017), The Photograph (2020), The Harder They Fall (2021), Haunted Mansion (2023), The Book of Clarence (2023), and I Love Boosters (2026). On television, he starred in the series Atlanta (2016–2022), for which he won a Black Reel Award for Television, and in the horror series The Changeling (2023).

== Early life ==
LaKeith Lee Stanfield was born in San Bernardino, California, on August 12, 1991, He was raised in Riverside and Victorville. His mother's name is Karen. Stanfield has described his upbringing as difficult, stating that he "grew up very poor in a fractured family that was dysfunctional on both sides".

During middle school, he attended school with future singer-songwriter and record producer Dijon Duenas, whom he defeated in a rap battle. He developed an interest in acting at the age of 14 after joining his high school's drama club. Stanfield later attended the John Casablancas Modeling and Career Center in Los Angeles, where he signed with a talent agency and began auditioning for commercial roles.

== Career ==
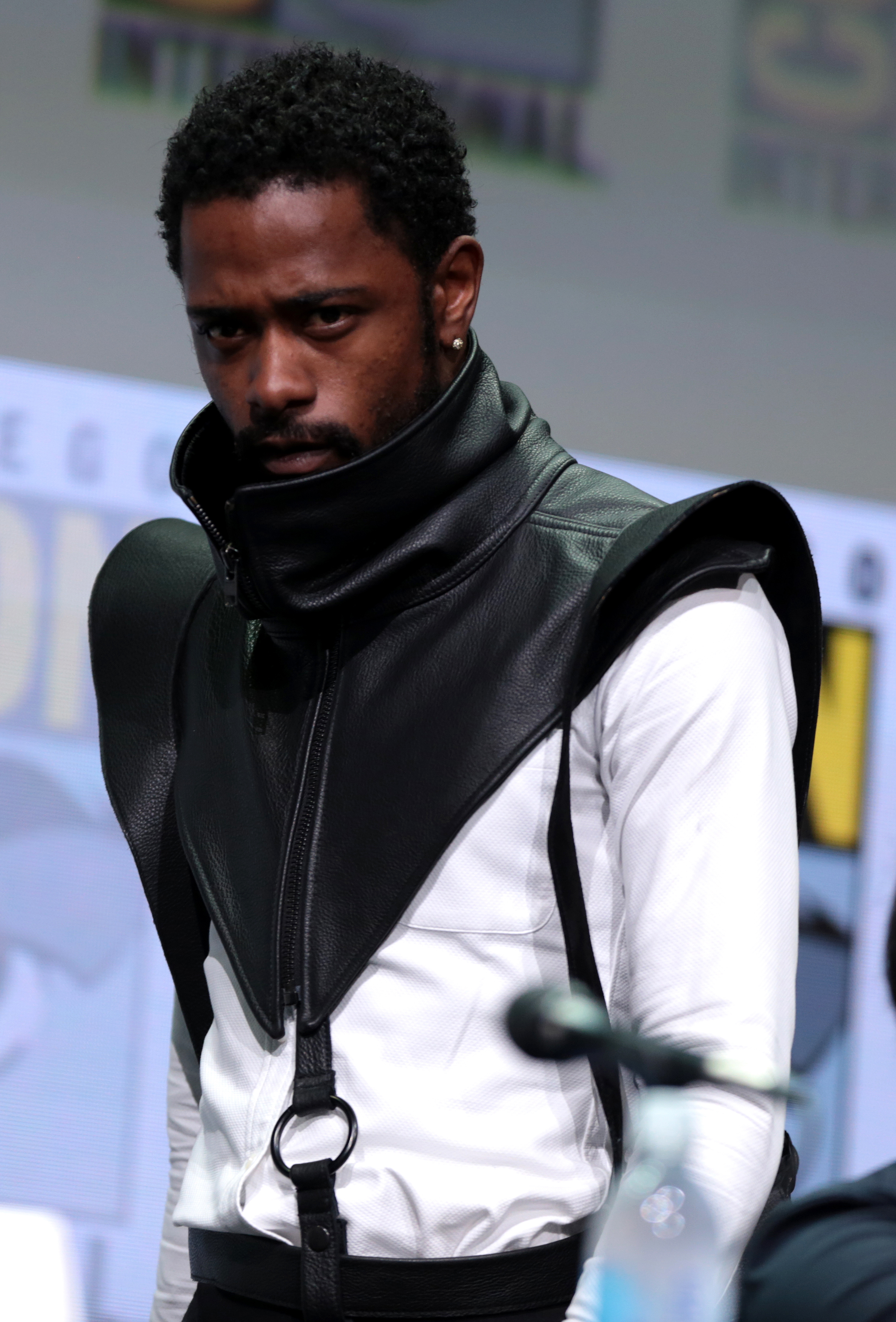
Stanfield in 2017

Stanfield's first acting role was in the short film Short Term 12, Destin Daniel Cretton's thesis project at San Diego State University, which won the Jury Award for U.S. Short Filmmaking at the 2009 Sundance Film Festival. A year later, he appeared in the short film Gimme Grace (2010). While continuing to keep his dreams of acting alive, he went on to work a number of different jobs such as roofing and gardening, and jobs at AT&T and a legal marijuana dispensary, before he was contacted by Cretton to reappear in a feature-length adaptation of Short Term 12. It was his first feature film role. During production, Stanfield practiced method acting, distancing himself from the other cast members like his character. He was the only actor to appear in both the short and feature versions. The film won the Grand Jury Prize for Best Narrative Feature at the 2013 South by Southwest film festival, and Stanfield was nominated for the Independent Spirit Award for Best Supporting Male.

In 2014, Stanfield co-starred in The Purge: Anarchy and Selma, in the latter playing civil rights activist Jimmie Lee Jackson. In 2015, he appeared in the films Memoria and Miles Ahead. He also starred in the fantasy horror thriller film King Ripple by filmmaker Luke Jaden, and appeared in the music video for the Run the Jewels song "Close Your Eyes (And Count to Fuck)". In 2015, he portrayed rapper Snoop Dogg in the biopic Straight Outta Compton. In 2017, he played L in Adam Wingard's adaptation of the popular Japanese fantasy-thriller manga series Death Note, for Netflix. Also that year, he starred in the music video for the song "Cold Little Heart" by English singer Michael Kiwanuka, and appeared in the critically acclaimed horror film Get Out. In 2018, he starred as Cassius "Cash" Green in the critically acclaimed dark comedy film Sorry to Bother You.

In 2019, Stanfield starred as Nate Davis in the Netflix romantic comedy film Someone Great. In the same year, he played Lieutenant Elliot in the mystery film Knives Out. He had starring roles in the films The Photograph (2020) and Judas and the Black Messiah (2021). His portrayal of FBI informant William O'Neal in the latter was critically acclaimed and garnered him a nomination for the Academy Award for Best Supporting Actor.

Stanfield performs under the stage name Htiekal (his first name backwards) and is working on his debut album, titled Self Control. He is a member of the band Moors, with Hrishikesh Hirway of Song Exploder. Stanfield signed to Def Jam in 2025.

== Personal life ==
Stanfield lives in Los Angeles. Stanfield has a daughter born in 2017 with actress Xosha Roquemore, and a second daughter born in 2022 with artist Tylor Hurd. In December 2022, Stanfield and model Kasmere Trice announced their engagement and by July 2023, they had privately married and had their first child together.

== Filmography ==
Key
†	Denotes films that have not yet been released

=== Film ===
Year	Title	Role	Notes
2008	Short Term 12	Mark	Short film
2013	Short Term 12	Marcus	
2014	The Purge: Anarchy	Young Ghoul Face	
2014	Selma	Jimmie Lee Jackson	
2015	Dope	Marquis a.k.a. Bug	
2015	Straight Outta Compton	Snoop Dogg	
2015	Miles Ahead	Junior	
2015	Memoria	Max	
2016	Live Cargo	Lewis	
2016	Snowden	Patrick Haynes	
2017	Crown Heights	Colin Warner	
2017	Get Out	Andre Hayworth / Logan King	
2017	The Incredible Jessica James	Damon	
2017	War Machine	Corporal Billy Cole	
2017	Izzy Gets the F*ck Across Town	George	
2017	Death Note	Lebensborn Atubia / L	
2018	Sorry to Bother You	Cassius "Cash" Green	
2018	Come Sunday	Reggie	
2018	The Girl in the Spider's Web	Edwin Needham	
2019	Someone Great	Nate Davis	
2019	Uncut Gems	Demany	
2019	Knives Out	Detective Lieutenant Elliot	
2020	The Photograph	Michael Block	
2021	Judas and the Black Messiah	William O'Neal	
2021	The Harder They Fall	Cherokee Bill	
2023	Haunted Mansion	Ben Matthias	
2023	The Book of Clarence	Clarence / Thomas	
2024	Ernest Cole: Lost and Found	Ernest Cole (voice)	Documentary
2025	Die My Love	Karl	
2025	Roofman	Steve	
2025	Play Dirty	Grofield	
2026	I Love Boosters	Pinky Ring Guy	
2026	The Wrong Girls	Not Metal Head Dave	
2027	F.A.S.T. †		Post-production
TBA	Lear Rex †	Edmund	Post-production
TBA	Slime †	(voice)	In production
TBA	Monsanto †	Dewayne Johnson	Filming

=== Television ===
Year	Title	Role	Notes
2016–2022	Atlanta	Darius	25 episodes
2018	Random Acts of Flyness	Himself	Episode: "What are your thoughts on raising free black children?"
2019–2020	BoJack Horseman	Guy (voice)	7 episodes
2020	The Eric Andre Show	Himself (co-host)	2 episodes
2021	Yasuke	Yasuke (voice)	6 episodes; also executive producer
2023	The Changeling	Apollo	8 episodes; also executive producer

Key
†	Denotes television productions that have not yet been released

=== Music videos ===
Year	Title	Artist	Role
2014	"When My Train Pulls In"	Gary Clark Jr.	Keith
2015	"Close Your Eyes (And Count to Fuck)"	Run the Jewels (featuring Zack de la Rocha)	Kid
2017	"Moonlight"	Jay-Z	Chandler
2017	"Cold Little Heart"	Michael Kiwanuka	
2022	"I Hate U"	SZA	
2022	"Shirt"	SZA	
2025	"Long Time"	Teyana Taylor	
2025	"Fast Life"	LaKeith Stanfield (featuring Kid Cudi)	

== Awards and nominations ==
Award	Year	Category	Work	Result	Ref.
Academy Awards	2021	Best Supporting Actor	Judas and the Black Messiah	Nominated	
Actor Awards	2018	Outstanding Performance by a Cast in a Motion Picture	Get Out	Nominated	
Actor Awards	2019	Outstanding Performance by an Ensemble in a Comedy Series	Atlanta	Nominated	
African-American Film Critics Association Awards	2018	Breakout Performance	Crown Heights	Won	
BAFTA Awards	2019	EE Rising Star Award	—N/a	Nominated	
BET Awards	2024	Best Actor	—N/a	Nominated	
Black Reel Awards	2014	Outstanding Supporting Actor	Short Term 12	Nominated	
Black Reel Awards	2014	Outstanding Breakthrough Performance – Male	Short Term 12	Nominated	
Black Reel Awards	2018	Outstanding Actor	Crown Heights	Nominated	
Black Reel Awards	2019	Outstanding Actor	Sorry to Bother You	Nominated	
Black Reel Awards	2021	Outstanding Actor	Judas and the Black Messiah	Nominated	
Black Reel Awards	2022	Outstanding Supporting Actor	The Harder They Fall	Nominated	
Black Reel TV Awards	2017	Outstanding Supporting Actor in a Comedy Series	Atlanta	Nominated	
Black Reel TV Awards	2018	Outstanding Supporting Actor in a Comedy Series	Atlanta	Won	
Black Reel TV Awards	2022	Outstanding Supporting Actor in a Comedy Series	Atlanta	Nominated	
Black Reel TV Awards	2024	Outstanding Supporting Performance in a Comedy Series	Atlanta	Nominated	
Critics' Choice Movie Awards	2019	Best Actor in a Comedy	Sorry to Bother You	Nominated	
Film Independent Spirit Awards	2014	Best Supporting Male	Short Term 12	Nominated	
Georgia Film Critics Association Awards	2014	Best Original Song	"So You Know What It's Like" (from Short Term 12)	Nominated	
Gotham Awards	2018	Best Actor	Sorry to Bother You	Nominated	
Gotham Awards	2021	Best Ensemble Cast	The Harder They Fall	Won	
Hamptons International Film Festival Awards	2015	Breakthrough Performer	Straight Outta Compton	Won	
International Cinephile Society Awards	2019	Best Actor	Sorry to Bother You	Nominated	
MTV Movie & TV Awards	2017	Best Duo (shared with Brian Tyree Henry)	Atlanta	Nominated	
NAACP Image Awards	2022	Outstanding Actor in a Motion Picture	Judas and the Black Messiah	Nominated	
NAACP Image Awards	2022	Outstanding Supporting Actor in a Motion Picture	The Harder They Fall	Nominated	
Satellite Awards	2014	Best Original Song	"So You Know What It's Like" (from Short Term 12)	Nominated	
Satellite Awards	2018	Best Supporting Actor – Series, Miniseries or Television Film	War Machine	Nominated	
24FPS International Short Film Festival Awards	2015	Best Actor	Tracks	Won	
