= The Book of Clarence =

2023 film by Jeymes Samuel

- Theatrical release poster
- Directed by: Jeymes Samuel
- Written by: Jeymes Samuel
- Produced by: Jeymes Samuel; Jay-Z; James Lassiter; Tendo Nagenda
- Starring: LaKeith Stanfield; Omar Sy; RJ Cyler; Anna Diop; David Oyelowo; Micheal Ward; Alfre Woodard; Teyana Taylor; Caleb McLaughlin; Eric Kofi-Abrefa; Marianne Jean-Baptiste; James McAvoy; Benedict Cumberbatch
- Cinematography: Rob Hardy
- Edited by: Tom Eagles
- Music by: Jeymes Samuel
- Production companies: Legendary Pictures; Kilburn Lane
- Distributed by: TriStar Pictures
- Release dates: October 11, 2023 (BFI); January 12, 2024 (United States)
- Running time: 129 minutes
- Country: United States
- Language: English
- Budget: $40 million
- Box office: $6.2 million

The Book of Clarence is a 2023 American biblical comedy-drama film written, scored and directed by Jeymes Samuel, and produced by Samuel, Jay-Z, James Lassiter, and Tendo Nagenda. The film stars LaKeith Stanfield, Omar Sy, RJ Cyler, Anna Diop, David Oyelowo, Micheal Ward, Alfre Woodard, Teyana Taylor, Caleb McLaughlin, Eric Kofi-Abrefa, Marianne Jean-Baptiste, James McAvoy, and Benedict Cumberbatch. It follows a struggling down-on-his-luck man named Clarence living in A.D. 33 Jerusalem who looks to capitalize on the rise of Jesus Christ, by claiming to be a new Messiah sent by God, in an attempt to free himself of debt and start a life of glory for himself.

The Book of Clarence had its world premiere at the BFI London Film Festival on October 11, 2023, and was released by TriStar Pictures in the United States on January 12, 2024. The film underperformed at the box office, grossing $6 million against a budget of $40 million, and received mixed reviews from critics.

== Plot ==
The story unfolds in three "Books": "The 13th Apostle"/"The New Messiah"/"The Crucifixion", title-lettered Ten Commandments-style.

A struggling Hebrew man in A.D. 33 Jerusalem, Clarence, and friend Elijah lose a chariot race with Mary Magdalene (and money the victory would have brought) due to difficulties such as gypsies shooting darts at them, and almost running over a dirt-encrusted beggar, Benjamin. Clarence owes money to loan shark Jedediah the Terrible, but also loves Jedediah's sister Varinia. Roman soldiers racially profile Clarence and Elijah for a theft they didn't commit.

Clarence, a marijuana smoker who steals honey wine from the Romans, smokes opium one day, around the floating-in-air bodies of other opium-smokers, and, seeing a light over his head, conceives the idea of being a fake messiah, capitalizing on the rise of Jesus Christ, to free himself of debt and start a life of glory. John the Baptist slaps him for being a hypocrite when he drops by to be baptized. Clarence proposes to the Twelve Apostles that he become the 13th apostle. They laugh at him. Clarence's blue-eyed twin brother Thomas, one of the Twelve, is cynical and dismissive towards Clarence. In turn, Clarence criticizes Thomas for leaving their mother to follow Jesus.

Judas Iscariot proposes that Clarence free a group of gladiator slaves, to earn his place as an apostle. Clarence goes to the gladiators' owner and proposes he free them. The owner instead says he'll free the slaves if they beat Clarence to death; then says he'll just have the huge Barabbas the Immortal fight Clarence. Clarence wins through trickery; Barabbas is freed, and goes with him. Barabbas is rebellious against Roman rule and antagonizes Roman soldiers. Barabbas claims to be truly immortal, except if hit in the heel (like Achilles). Clarence visits Jesus' mother Mary, and father Joseph, asking how he can perform the same "tricks" Jesus does. The parents insist that Jesus is real, not a trickster. Clarence, Elijah, Barabbas, and Zeke travel the land, with Clarence performing "miracles" like bringing Elijah "back from the dead". They make much money. Also, Clarence, an atheist, preaches "knowledge over belief". However, Clarence decides to use the money to free the gladiators, rather than paying back Jedediah.

Meanwhile, Elijah attempts to help Mary Magdalene, who is being stoned to death due to accusations of sexual congress with Romans. Jesus arrives, stops the stones' flight in mid-air, and notes that the stone-throwers are themselves sinners. He heals Mary's wounds. Elijah believes. Varinia betrays Clarence by being at a party with him, with Jedediah waiting outside. Jedediah tries to collect his money. The Romans arrive at the same time to arrest Clarence for being a messiah. Barabbas resists, though Clarence insists he run away. Barabbas is speared three times, but survives, killing a Roman centurion sent after him. Jedediah is impressed and makes up with Clarence, though the Romans take Clarence away, since they are supposed to arrest any messiahs.

Pontius Pilate interrogates Clarence, who confesses that he is a trickster, not a messiah. Pilate says that despite confessing to fraud, Clarence may save himself by walking across water (a nearby pool). Clarence, to his own amazement, is able to do so, following a vision in the clouds. Nevertheless, Pilate says he will crucify him. Varinia visits Clarence in prison, and kisses him. Thomas also reconciles with him. Pilate mocks Jesus' ideas of human equality, and proposes to Clarence to reveal to him the location of Jesus so that he can regain his freedom, though Clarence mocks the Romans' male nude statues and refuses to betray Jesus.

Jesus gives money to Benjamin, and the ability to multiply coins. The newly-rich Benjamin buys a "makeover": under the dirt, he is a long-haired white man who resembles conventional portrayals of Jesus. Benjamin traipses around, throwing money to people, and Romans believe he is another "messiah". On the way to the cross, Amina, Elijah, and Barabbas watch. Cabbage, a small gypsy who despised Clarence, now helps carry his cross. Benjamin is crucified alongside Clarence, complaining that an onlooker is making a painting of him (looking like a traditional white Jesus). Jesus tells his grieving disciples that he himself will be betrayed and crucified. Jesus comes to Clarence's tomb, forgives his prior unbelief, and raises him from the dead and heals his nail wounds. Clarence now both "knows" and "believes", and smiles.

== Cast ==
- LaKeith Stanfield as Clarence / Thomas
- Omar Sy as Barabbas
- Anna Diop as Varinia, Clarence's love interest and Jedediah's sister
- RJ Cyler as Elijah, Clarence's best friend
- David Oyelowo as John the Baptist
- Micheal Ward as Judas Iscariot
- Alfre Woodard as Virgin Mary
- Brian Bovell as Joseph
- Teyana Taylor as Mary Magdalene
- Caleb McLaughlin as Dirty Zeke
- Marianne Jean-Baptiste as Amina, Clarence's mother
- Eric Kofi-Abrefa as Jedediah the Terrible
- James McAvoy as Pontius Pilate
- Benedict Cumberbatch as Benjamin
- Nicholas Pinnock as Jesus
- Babs Olusanmokun as Asher the Torturer
- Chase Dillon as Cabbage
- Chidi Ajufo as Goliath
- Tom Glynn-Carney as Decimus
- Tom Vaughan-Lawlor as Antoninus

== Production ==
In May 2022, Jeymes Samuel announced that The Book of Clarence would be his next film, and that LaKeith Stanfield would portray the title character. He cited biblical epics such as The Ten Commandments (1956), The Greatest Story Ever Told (1965), Samson and Delilah (1949), and Ben-Hur (1959) as films he was modeling Clarence after. In October, Omar Sy joined the cast, with Legendary Entertainment acquiring the project.

In December, RJ Cyler, Benedict Cumberbatch, James McAvoy, Anna Diop, David Oyelowo, Alfre Woodard and Marianne Jean-Baptiste were among several additions to the cast. It was also announced that Rob Hardy would serve as cinematographer, Tom Eagles as editor, Peter Walpole as production designer, and that Samuel would compose the score.

Filming began in November 2022 in Matera, Italy.

== Music ==
The film's score and soundtrack were composed by director and writer Jeymes Samuel. Samuel stated that writing and directing the film while also composing the score and performing the soundtrack was a "journey where one depended on the other." In November 2023, the lead single for the soundtrack, "Hallelujah Heaven", featuring Lil Wayne, Buju Banton, and Shabba Ranks was released. The film's score and soundtrack were released on January 12, 2024. The soundtrack features D’Angelo, Jorge Ben Jor, Lil Wayne, Buju Banton, Shabba Ranks, Kodak Black, Doja Cat, Adekunle Gold, Jorja Smith, Yemi Alade, JAY-Z, Kid Cudi, Marcus Eaton, Alice Smith, and Terry Callier.

== Release ==
The Book of Clarence had its world premiere at the 67th BFI London Film Festival on October 11, 2023, and was theatrically released on January 12, 2024. It was originally set to be released on September 22, 2023, but was delayed for unspecified reasons.

== Reception ==
=== Box office ===
In the United States and Canada, The Book of Clarence was released alongside The Beekeeper and Mean Girls, and was projected to gross around $7 million in its opening weekend. It made $1 million on its first day, including $285,000 from Thursday night previews. The film ended up severely underperforming, debuting to $2.6 million and finishing in 10th place.

=== Critical response ===
On the review aggregator website Rotten Tomatoes, 65% of 118 critics' reviews are positive. The website's consensus reads: "The Book of Clarence makes light work of some heavy subject matter, with undeniably entertaining—albeit uneven—results." Metacritic, which uses a weighted average, assigned the film a score of 57 out of 100, based on 27 critics, indicating "mixed or average" reviews. Audiences polled by CinemaScore gave the film an average grade of "B" on an A+ to F scale, while those polled by PostTrak gave it a 67% overall positive score, with 45% saying they would definitely recommend the film.

Guy Lodge of Variety wrote "Biblical cinema could use more messengers with Samuel's eccentricity and daring, alive to the limitations and biases that have hitherto made for such a stylistically uniform genre".

== See also ==
- Monty Python's Life of Brian, a biblical comedy film about a person being mistaken for the messiah
