= RJ Cyler =

American actor

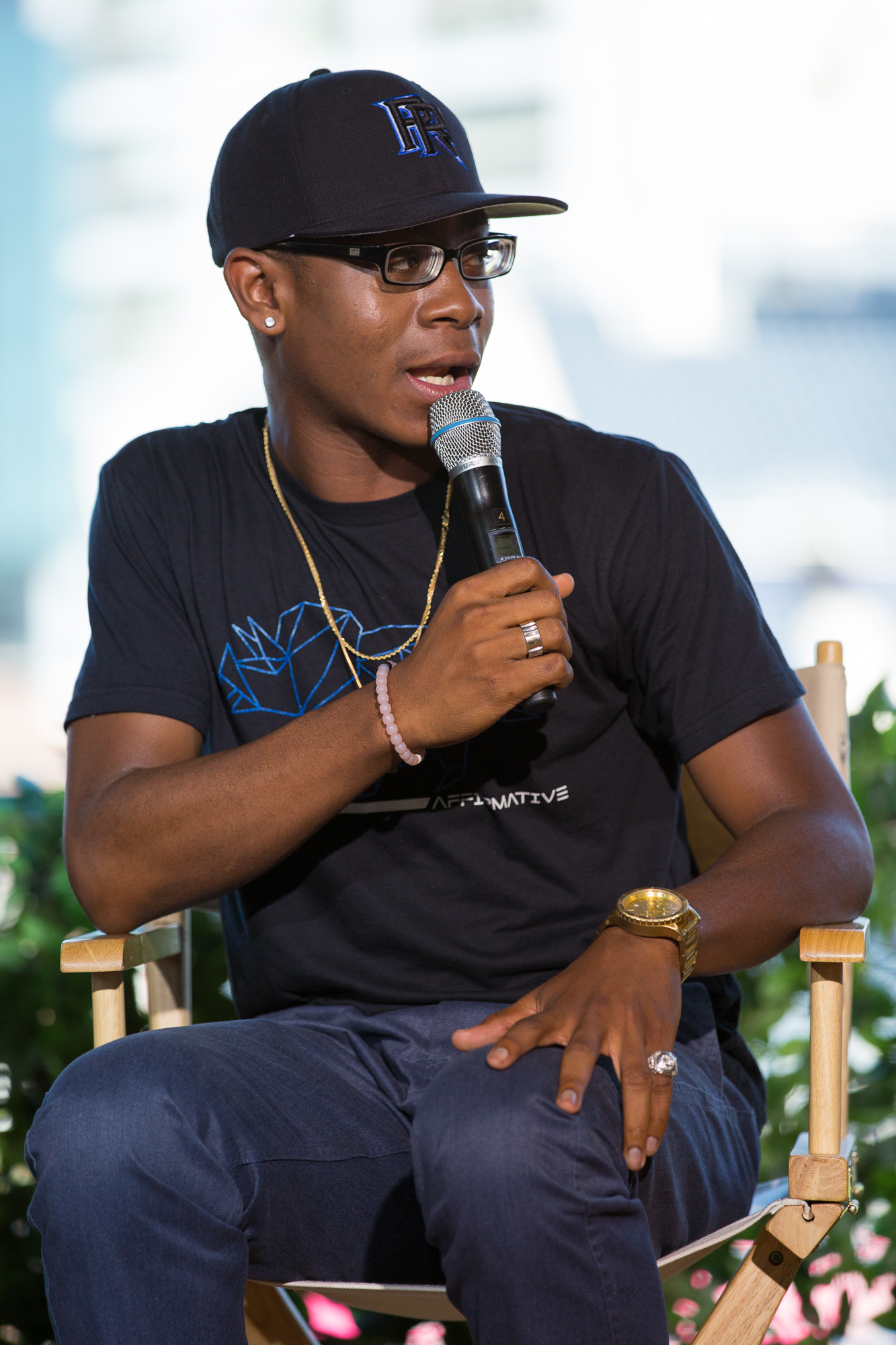
- Cyler in 2016
- Born: Ronald Cyler II; March 21, 1995 (age 31); Jacksonville, Florida, U.S.
- Occupation: Actor
- Years active: 2013–present

Ronald "RJ" Cyler II (born March 21, 1995) is an American actor. His films include Me and Earl and the Dying Girl (2015), Power Rangers (2017), The Harder They Fall (2021), and Emergency (2022). On television, he is known for his roles in the Showtime series I'm Dying Up Here (2017–2018) and Scream: Resurrection (2019).

== Early life ==
Cyler was raised in Jacksonville, Florida, the youngest of three children of Katina, a cook, and Ronald Cyler, a truck driver. His parents, who were working but struggling, sold what they had to move from Florida to California in 2013. They were homeless until shortly before Cyler was cast in his role in Me and Earl and the Dying Girl. Cyler finished high school in California.

== Career ==
In 2013, Cyler appeared in the short film Second Chances. In 2015, Cyler got his biggest acting break when he co-starred in the film Me and Earl and the Dying Girl, based on the book of the same name by Jesse Andrews. The film had its world premiere at the Sundance Film Festival on January 25, 2015. Shortly after the premiere, Fox Searchlight Pictures acquired distribution rights for the film and released it on June 12, 2015. In 2016, Cyler appeared in the HBO series Vice Principals.

Cyler played autistic blue ranger Billy Cranston in Lionsgate Films' 2017 reboot of the Power Rangers.

Cyler was part of the ensemble cast of I'm Dying Up Here, a Showtime drama executive-produced by Jim Carrey, which ran from 2017 to 2018. In 2018, he co-starred in the drama film White Boy Rick, directed by Yann Demange, about Richard Wershe Jr.

On September 13, 2017, it was announced that Cyler joined as a series regular in the third season of the VH1 slasher television series Scream. He starred in the lead role of Deion Elliot. The season premiered on July 8, 2019.

In 2018, Cyler starred as Dan in the Netflix comedy-drama film, Sierra Burgess Is a Loser. On November 13, 2018, Cyler was cast in a recurring role on the second season of the CW series Black Lightning.

In January 2019, Cyler was reportedly cast in the DC Universe horror series, Swamp Thing.

== Personal life ==
Cyler is a streamer on Twitch. He streams under the name LemonPeppa904, playing games such as Resident Evil, Grand Theft Auto V and Call of Duty.

== Filmography ==
=== Film ===
Year	Title	Role	Notes
2013	Second Chances	R. J.	Short film
2015	Me and Earl and the Dying Girl	Earl Jackson	Nominated — San Diego Film Critics Society Award for Best Supporting Actor; Nominated — Critics' Choice Movie Award for Best Young Performer
2017	Power Rangers	Billy Cranston / Blue Ranger	
2017	War Machine	Technical Sergeant Andy Moon	
2017	Everything, Everything	Vinny	
2018	White Boy Rick	Rudell Curry	
2018	Sierra Burgess Is a Loser	Dan	
2021	R#J	Benvolio	
2021	The Harder They Fall	James Beckwourth	
2022	Emergency	Sean	
2022	Freedom's Path	Kitch	
2023	The Book of Clarence	Elijah	
2025	One Spoon of Chocolate	Ramsey	
2025	Night Patrol	Wazi	

=== Television ===
Year	Title	Role	Notes
2016	Vice Principals	Luke Brown	3 episodes
2017–2018	I'm Dying Up Here	Adam Proteau	Main role
2018	Black Lightning	Todd Green	Recurring role
2019	Scream: Resurrection	Deion Elliot / Marcus Elliot	Main role; 6 episodes (as Deion Elliot); Episode: "The Man Behind the Mask" (as Marcus Elliot)
2019	Swamp Thing	Jones	Episode: "Pilot"
2022–2024	Rap Sh!t	Lamont	Main role
2026	The 'Burbs	Langston	Recurring role

== Awards and nominations ==
Award	Year	Category	Nominated work	Result	Ref.
Black Reel Awards	2016	Outstanding Breakthrough Performance, Male	Me and Earl and the Dying Girl	Nominated	
Critics Choice Awards	2016	Best Young Actor/Actress	Me and Earl and the Dying Girl	Nominated	
San Diego Film Critics Society Awards	2015	Best Supporting Actor	Me and Earl and the Dying Girl	Nominated	
Teen Choice Awards	2015	Choice Movie: Chemistry (Note: Shared with Thomas Mann)	Me and Earl and the Dying Girl	Nominated	
Teen Choice Awards	2017	Choice Scene Stealer	Power Rangers	Nominated	
