= Victoria Thomas =

Victoria Thomas is a producer based in Scotland. She is the founder and director of The Polkadot Factory, an Edinburgh-based production company. She is also a co-founder of Eden's Theory, an artisan beauty line sold online, along with Nse Ikpe-Etim. She was nominated for a BAFTA in 2011.
