= Adam Schultz =

American photographer (born 1980s)

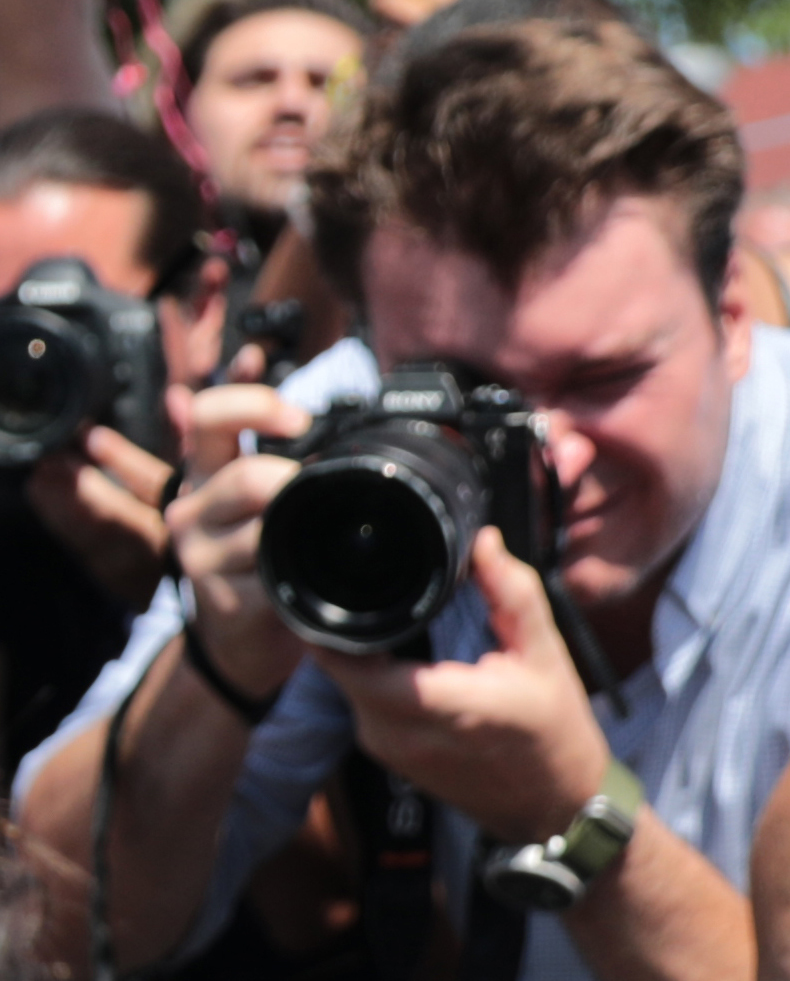
- Schultz photographing Joe Biden at the 2019 Iowa State Fair

Chief Official White House Photographer
- In office January 20, 2021 – January 20, 2025
- President: Joe Biden
- Preceded by: Shealah Craighead
- Succeeded by: Daniel Torok

Personal details
- Born: 1983 or 1984 (age 42–43)
- Education: Georgia State University
- Website: adamschultzphotography.com

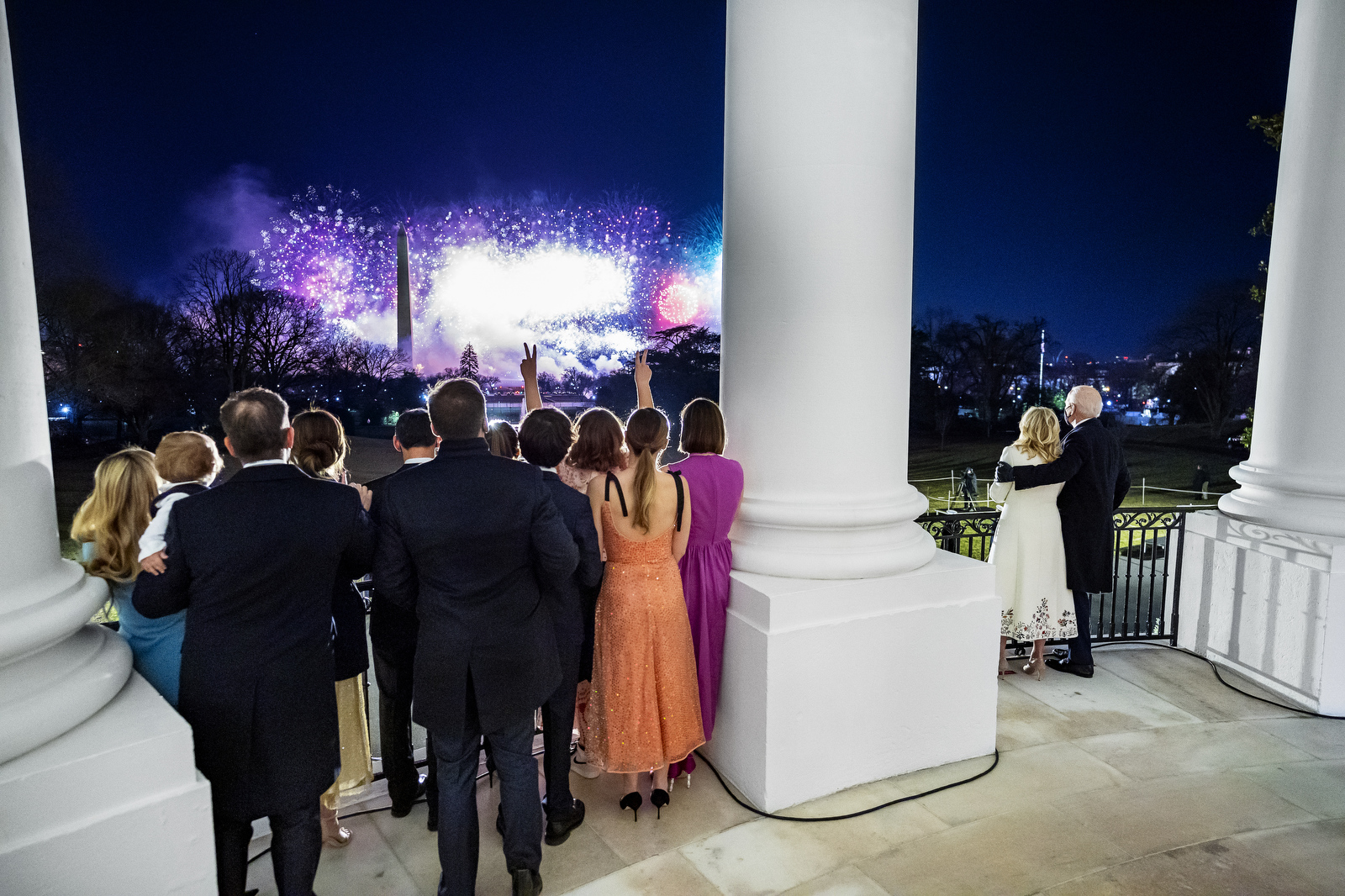
Photo by Schultz of President Biden and his family watching the Celebrating America fireworks on the night of his Inauguration

Adam Schultz (born 1983 or 1984) is an American photographer who served as the chief official White House photographer for the presidency of Joe Biden from 2021 to 2025.

== Career ==
Schultz worked for the Clinton Foundation in New York City from 2007 until 2013. He served as a photographer for Hillary Clinton's 2016 presidential campaign, working under Barbara Kinney. He then joined Biden's team in April 2019, after the former vice president began running for the Democratic nomination, serving as the lead photographer for Biden's 2020 presidential campaign. President Biden offered Schultz access to both public and private moments on the campaign trail and offered his own input and suggestions.

In his White House role, Schultz led a team of seven people. He uses Sony α9 II cameras.

== Personal life ==
Schultz is from Atlanta, Georgia, and is a graduate of Georgia State University. A self-described "car nut", he worked as an auto mechanic while at college.

Besides some high school and college classes, he did not study photography full-time.

== See also ==
- Lawrence Jackson (photographer of Biden's vice president, Kamala Harris)
