= Chief Official White House Photographer =

Senior position appointed by the president of the United States

Office of the White House Chief Photographer
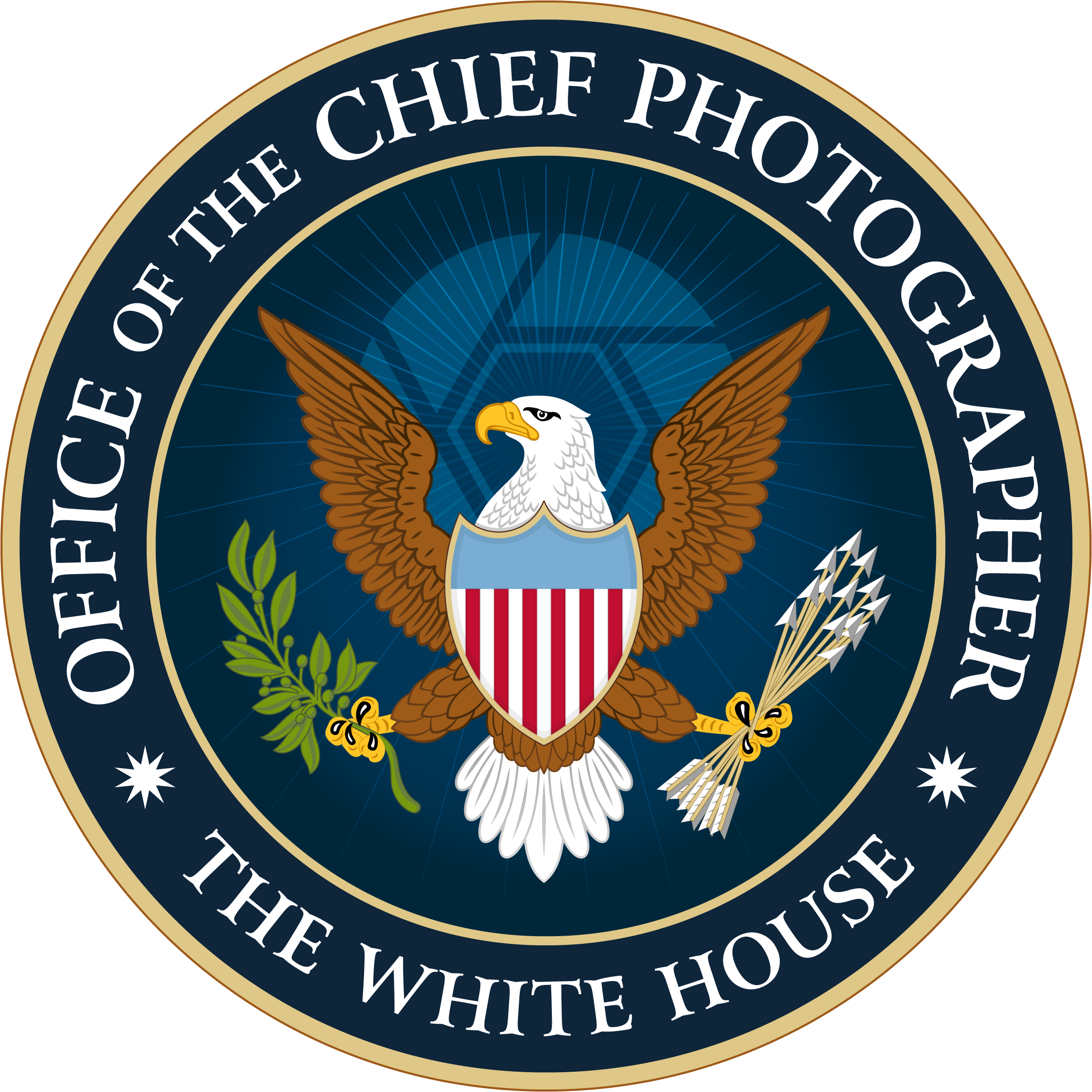

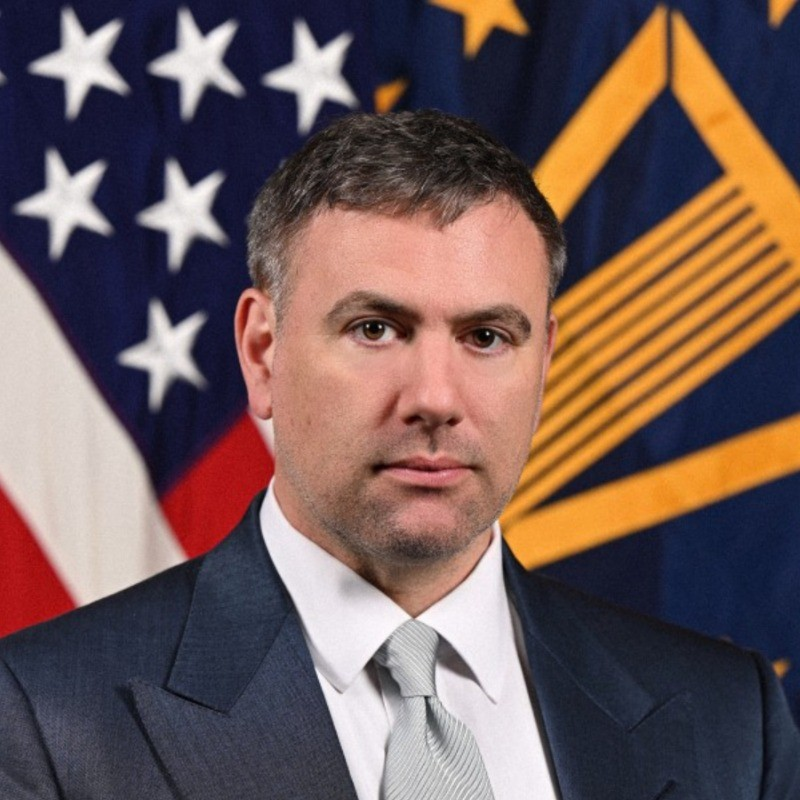
- Incumbent; Daniel Torok since January 20, 2025
- Executive Office of the President; White House Office
- Reports to: President of the United States
- Appointer: President of the United States
- Term length: No fixed term
- Formation: 1961 (Official White House Photographer); 1969 (Official Photographer of the President); 1981 (Chief Official White House Photographer)
- First holder: Cecil W. Stoughton
- Abolished: 1977 (Re-established in 1981); 1985 (Re-established in 1989)
- Unofficial names: White House Photographer; Presidential Photographer
- Website: The White House; Official Online Photo Archive

The official White House photographer is a senior position appointed by the president of the United States to cover the president's official day-to-day duties. There have been twelve official White House photographers. Since the beginning of the second presidency of Donald Trump, the position is currently occupied by Daniel Torok.

The first official White House photographer was Cecil W. Stoughton, appointed by John F. Kennedy. Previously, official photographs had been taken by various military photographers. In the aftermath of Kennedy's assassination, it was Stoughton who was behind the lens for the iconic picture of Lyndon B. Johnson's inauguration on Air Force One, alongside Kennedy's widow, Jacqueline. Although Stoughton stayed on as a White House photographer for the next two years, it was Johnson's personal photographer, Yoichi Okamoto, who succeeded him in the role. For the first time ever, Okamoto was allowed access to the Oval Office.

Oliver F. Atkins was the official photographer for Richard Nixon, but was often restricted from taking photographs. However, Atkins' photograph of President Nixon and Elvis Presley is the most requested from the Library of Congress. The relationship between David Hume Kennerly and Gerald Ford was far more positive, as the official White House photographer returned to full-time activity. Kennerly's photograph of President Ford petting his Golden Retriever Liberty is arguably his most well known photograph from this era.

Jimmy Carter offered the job to Stanley Tretick, but was turned down by the photojournalist, who stated: "I didn't feel he wanted an intimate, personal photographer around him". As a result, Carter did not have a personal photographer, and it was not until 1981 that the official White House photographer came back. During Ronald Reagan's first term as President, the official photographer was Michael Evans. However, during his second term, new Chief of Staff Don Regan decided that all the White House photographers should have equal access (including Pete Souza, who was a staffer at the time), so no one was designated as Reagan's official photographer. Evans, who was leaving his post, was unhappy about not being succeeded and fired off a telegram to express his disapproval, to which Reagan quickly replied, adamant in his decision. For George H. W. Bush's term as president, he appointed David Valdez. His most well known photograph was for Life, where Bush and his wife Barbara were in bed together, surrounded by their grandchildren.

During the 1990s, Bill Clinton's official photographer was Vietnam War veteran Bob McNeely, who chose to shoot his photographs in black and white. McNeely was barred in the fallout of the Lewinsky scandal, and eventually quit the position in 1998, citing a desire to be with his family. His association with the Clintons did not end there, as he was the official photographer for Hillary Clinton's senate campaign in 2000.

Eric Draper, who served as George W. Bush's official photographer throughout his presidency, transitioned from film to digital over the course of Bush's first term. For Barack Obama's two terms as president, Souza returned to the White House. He has been associated with Obama since 2005, when working as a political photographer for CNN, was tasked with documenting Obama's first year as Illinois Senator, and stayed on afterward. Situation Room is Souza's best known work under the Obama administration.

Initially, it seemed that Donald Trump had not picked an official photographer for his first presidential term, but Shealah Craighead was announced in the news media as such, a week after his inauguration. Craighead worked in the White House before as the photographer for Dick Cheney and Laura Bush. She was campaign photographer for Sarah Palin and Marco Rubio, and was the official photographer at Jenna Bush's wedding.

Appointed to chronicle Donald Trump's second presidential term, Daniel Torok has served as the incumbent official White House photographer since January 20, 2025.

== List of official photographers ==
No.	Portrait	Chief Official Photographer	Took office	Left office	President
1	Cecil W. Stoughton	Cecil W. Stoughton (1920–2008)	1961	1963	John F. Kennedy (D)
2	Yoichi Okamoto	Yoichi Okamoto (1915–1985)	1963	1969	Lyndon B. Johnson (D)
3	Oliver F. Atkins	Oliver F. Atkins (1917–1977)	1969	1974	Richard Nixon (R)
4	David Hume Kennerly	David Hume Kennerly (born 1947)	1974	1977	Gerald Ford (R)
Vacant; 1977–1981					Jimmy Carter (D)
5	Michael Evans	Michael Evans (1944–2005)	1981	1985	Ronald Reagan (R)
Vacant; 1985–1989					Ronald Reagan (R)
6	David Valdez	David Valdez (born 1949)	January 20, 1989	January 20, 1993	George H. W. Bush (R)
7	Bob McNeely	Bob McNeely (born 1945)	January 20, 1993	September 1998	Bill Clinton (D)
8	Sharon Farmer	Sharon Farmer (born 1951)	September 1998	January 20, 2001	Bill Clinton (D)
9	Eric Draper	Eric Draper (born 1964)	January 20, 2001	January 20, 2009	George W. Bush (R)
10	Pete Souza	Pete Souza (born 1954)	January 20, 2009	January 20, 2017	Barack Obama (D)
11	Shealah Craighead	Shealah Craighead (born 1976)	January 20, 2017	January 20, 2021	Donald Trump (R)
12	Adam Schultz	Adam Schultz (born 1983 or 1984)	January 20, 2021	January 20, 2025	Joe Biden (D)
13	Daniel Torok	Daniel Torok (born 1982)	January 20, 2025		Donald Trump (R)

== Gallery ==
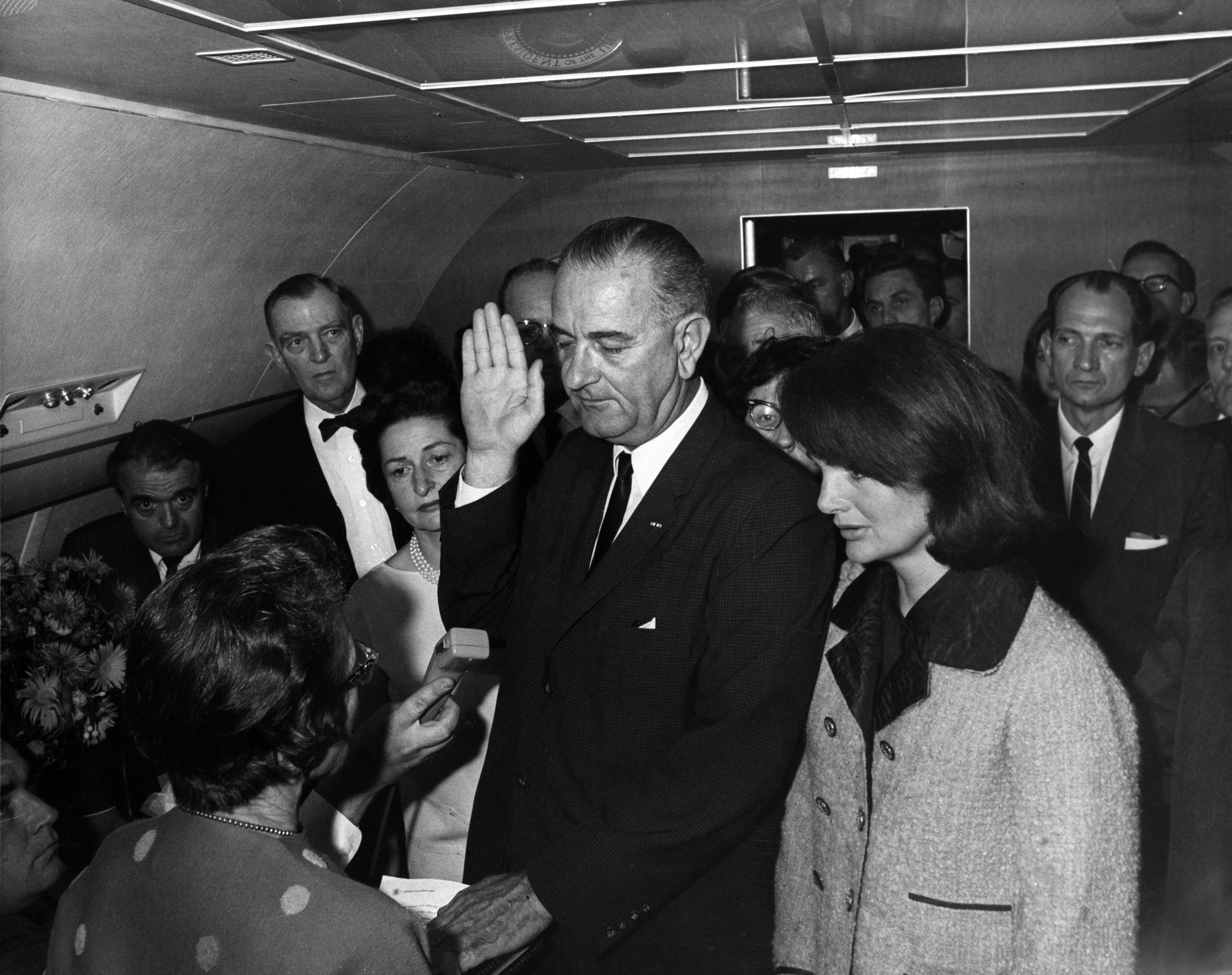
The inauguration of President Johnson onboard Air Force One
(Stoughton, 1963)

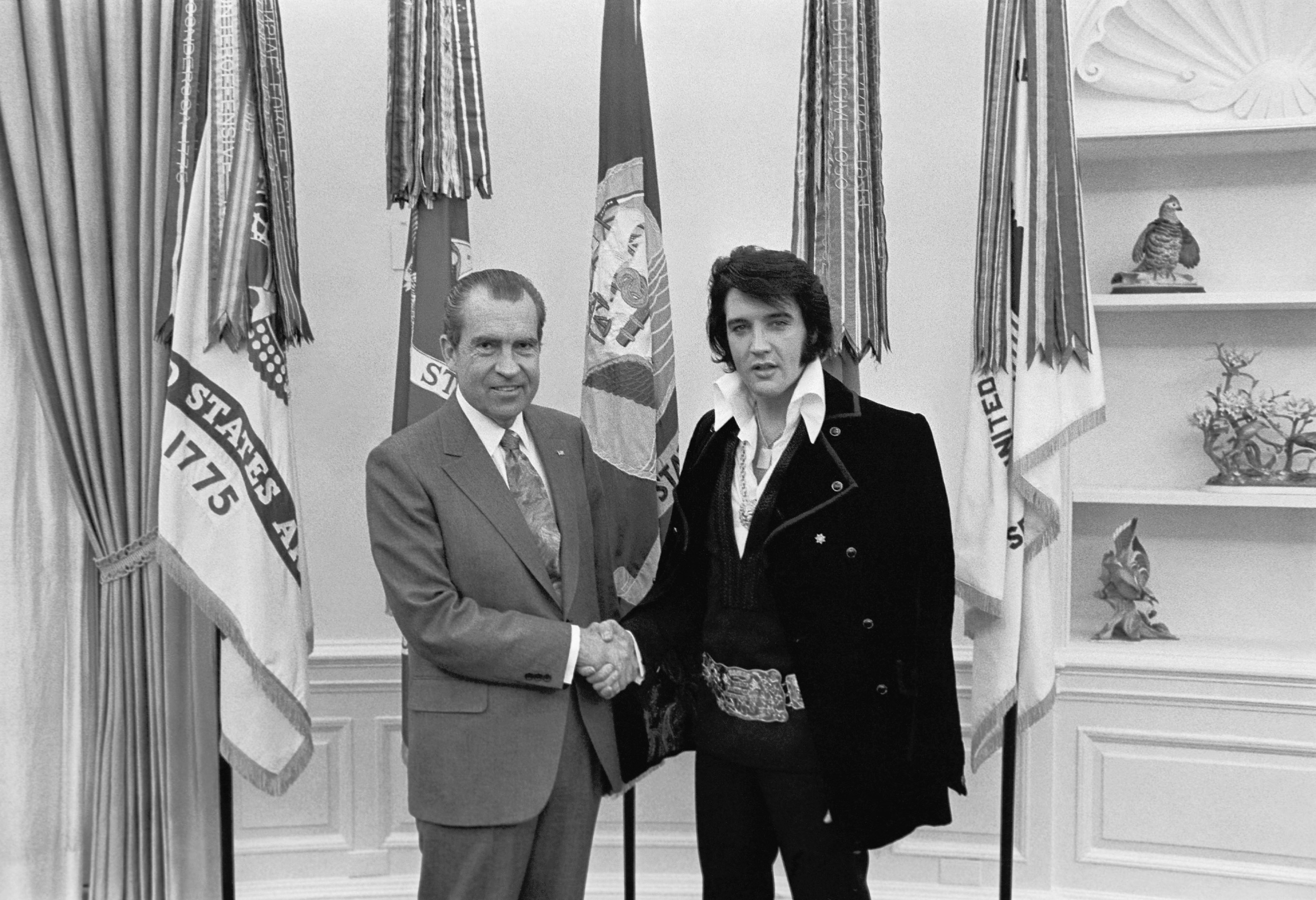
President Nixon and Elvis Presley
(Atkins, 1970)

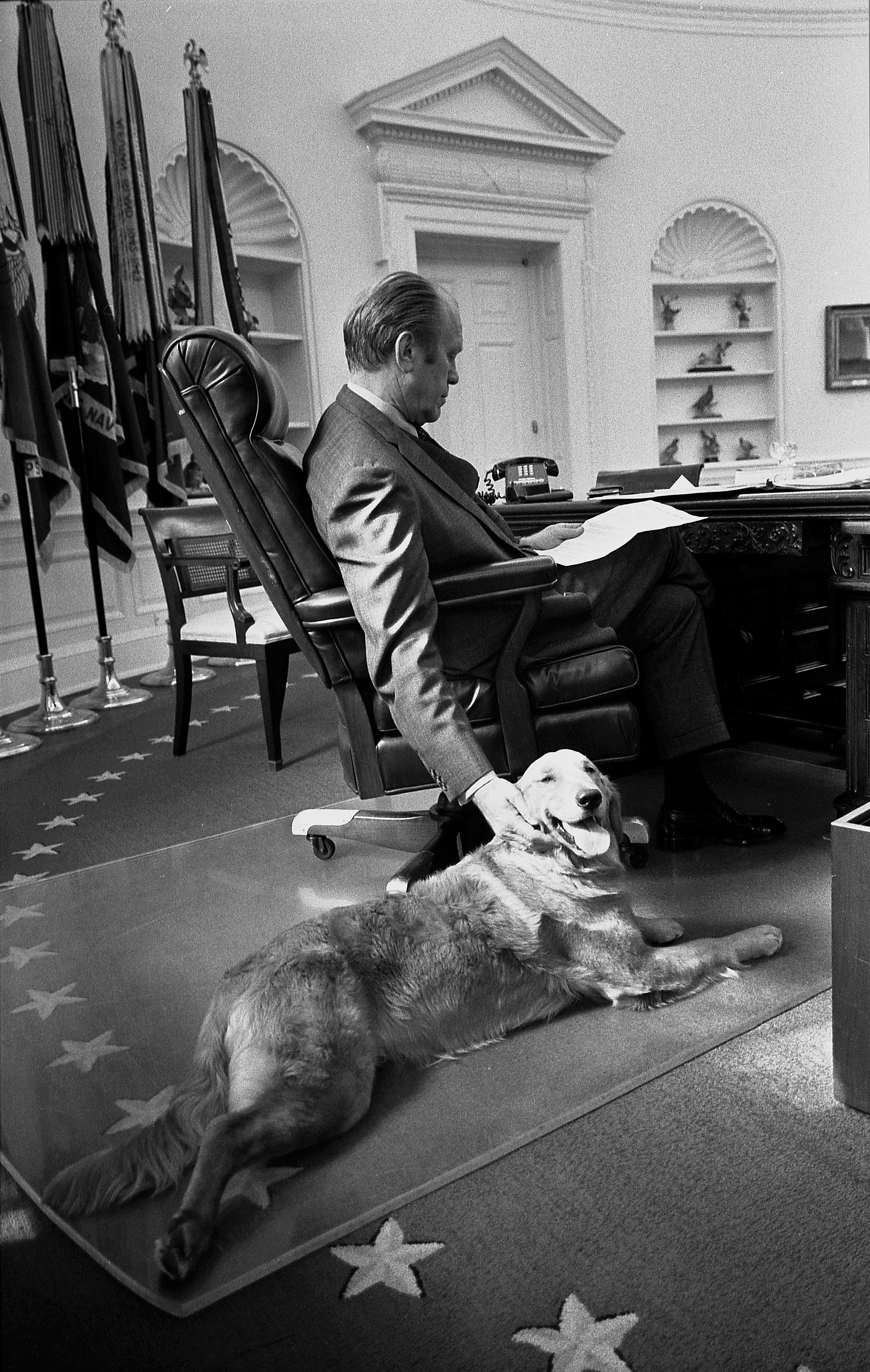
President Ford and his dog, Liberty, in the Oval Office
(Kennerly, 1974)

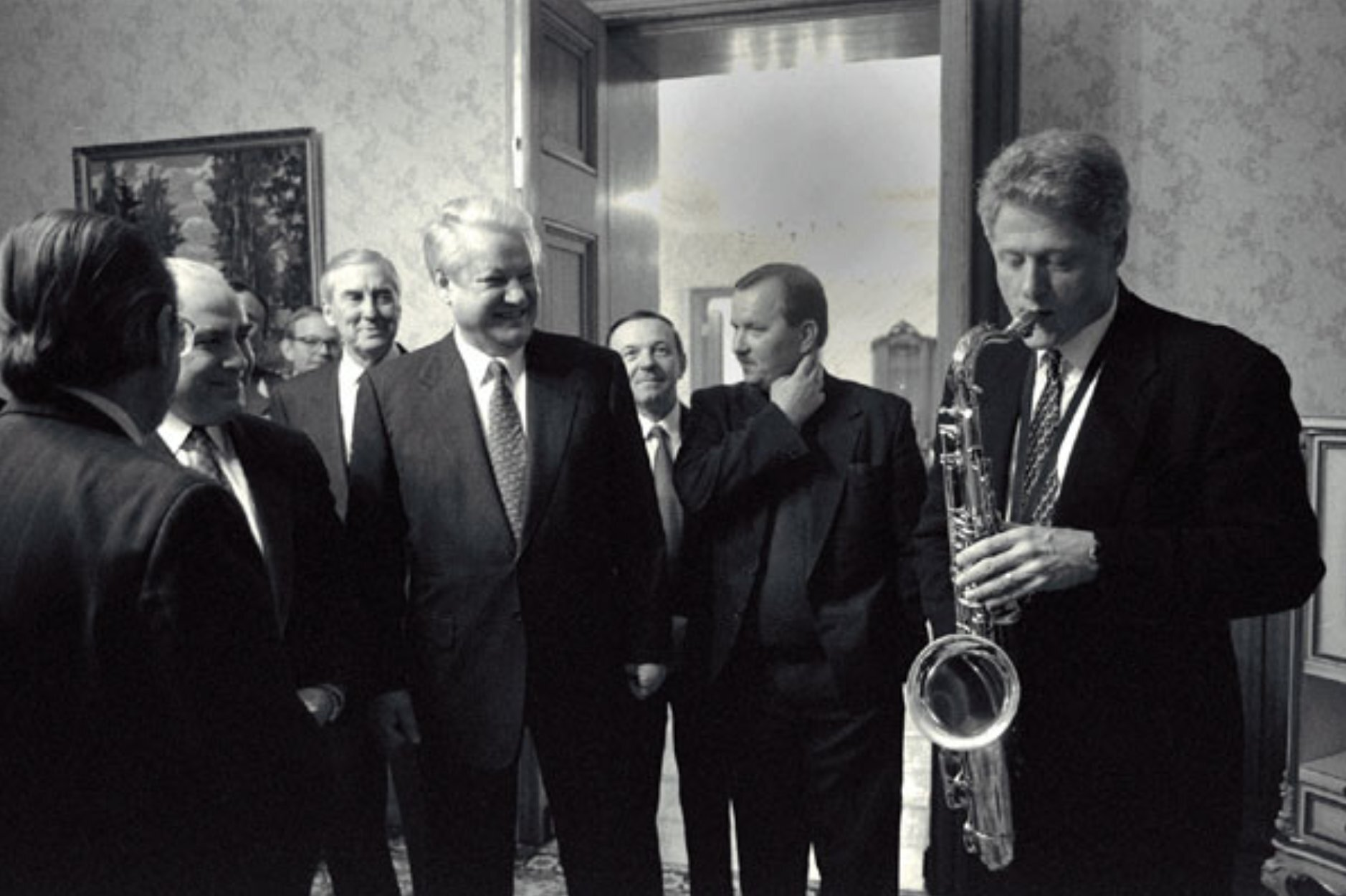
President Clinton playing a saxophone presented to him by the President of Russia, Boris Yeltsin
(McNeely, 1994)

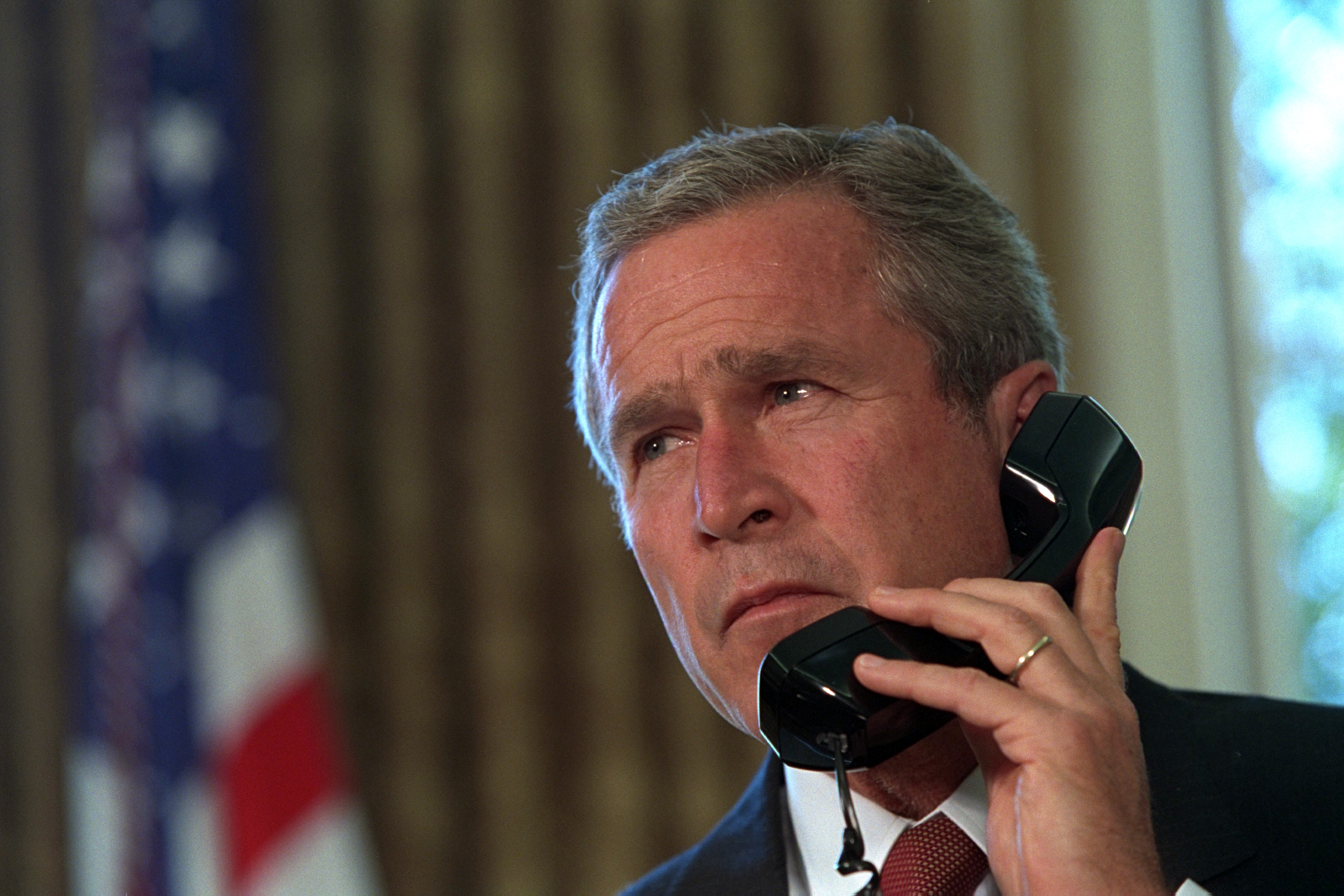
President Bush speaks on the phone to New York's Governor and Mayor respectively, George Pataki and Rudy Giuliani, two days after the September 11 attacks.
(Draper, 2001)

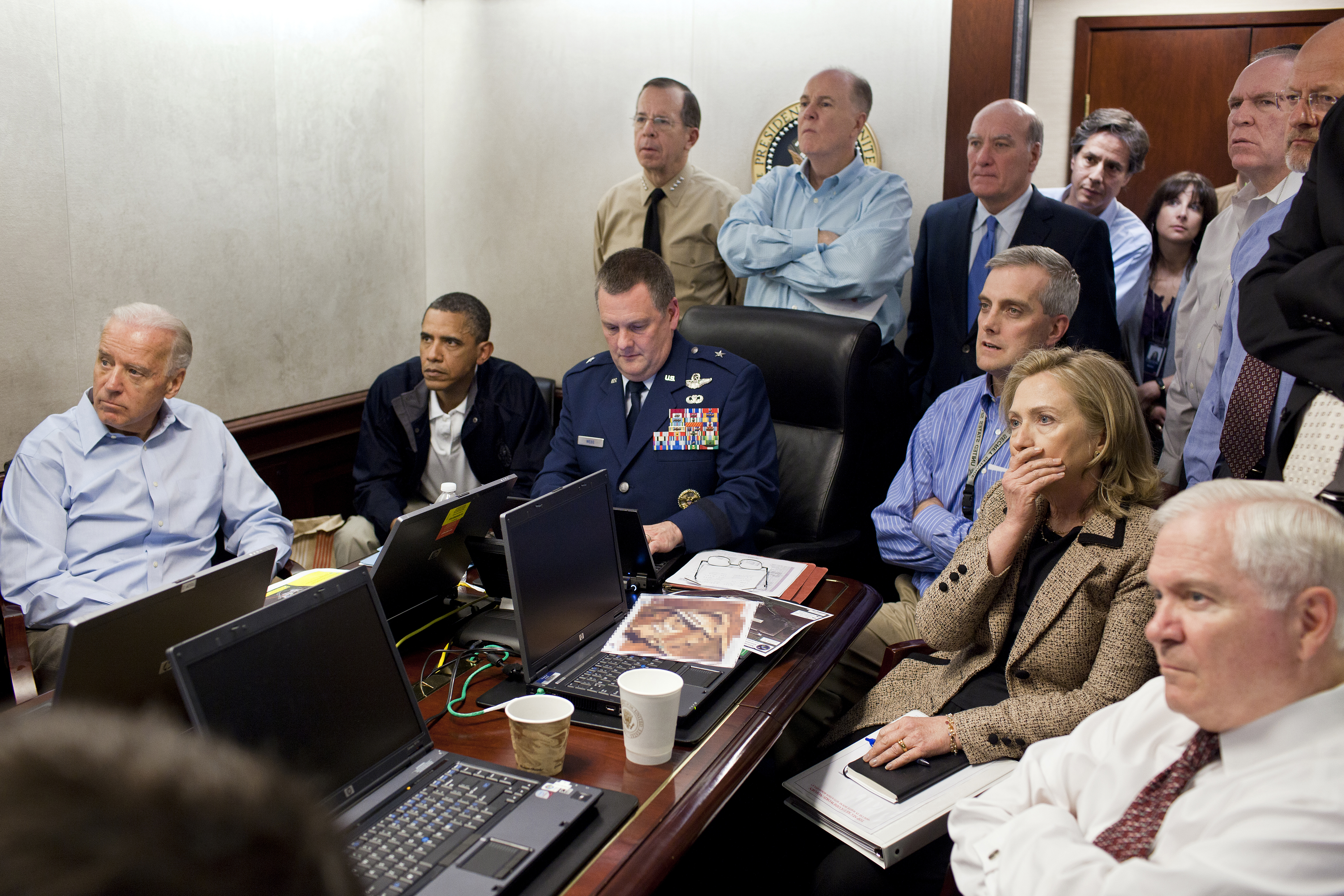
President Obama, Vice President Biden and the national security team await updates of Operation Neptune Spear.
(Souza, 2011)

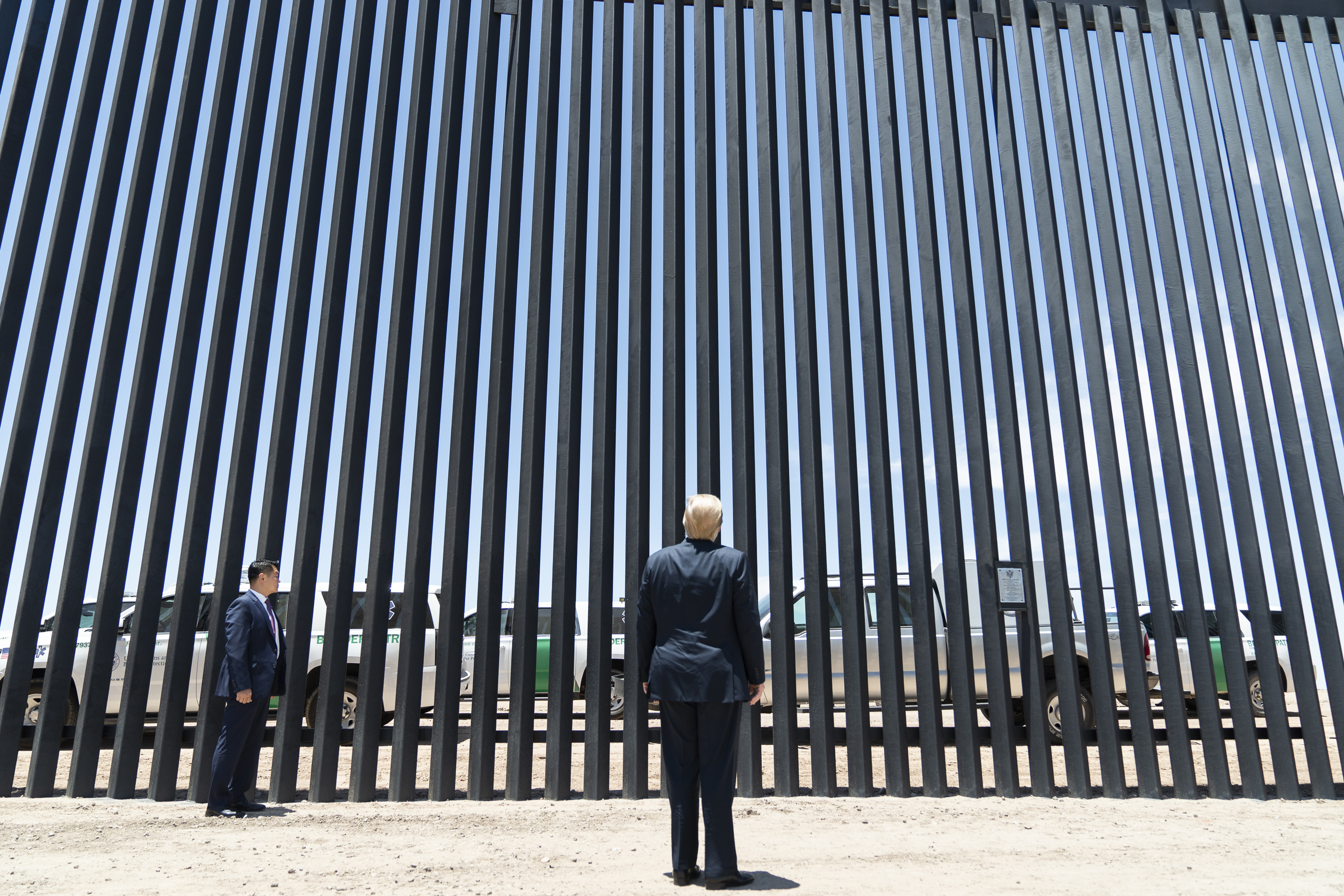
President Trump in front of "The Wall" at the Arizona–Mexico border
(Craighead, 2020)

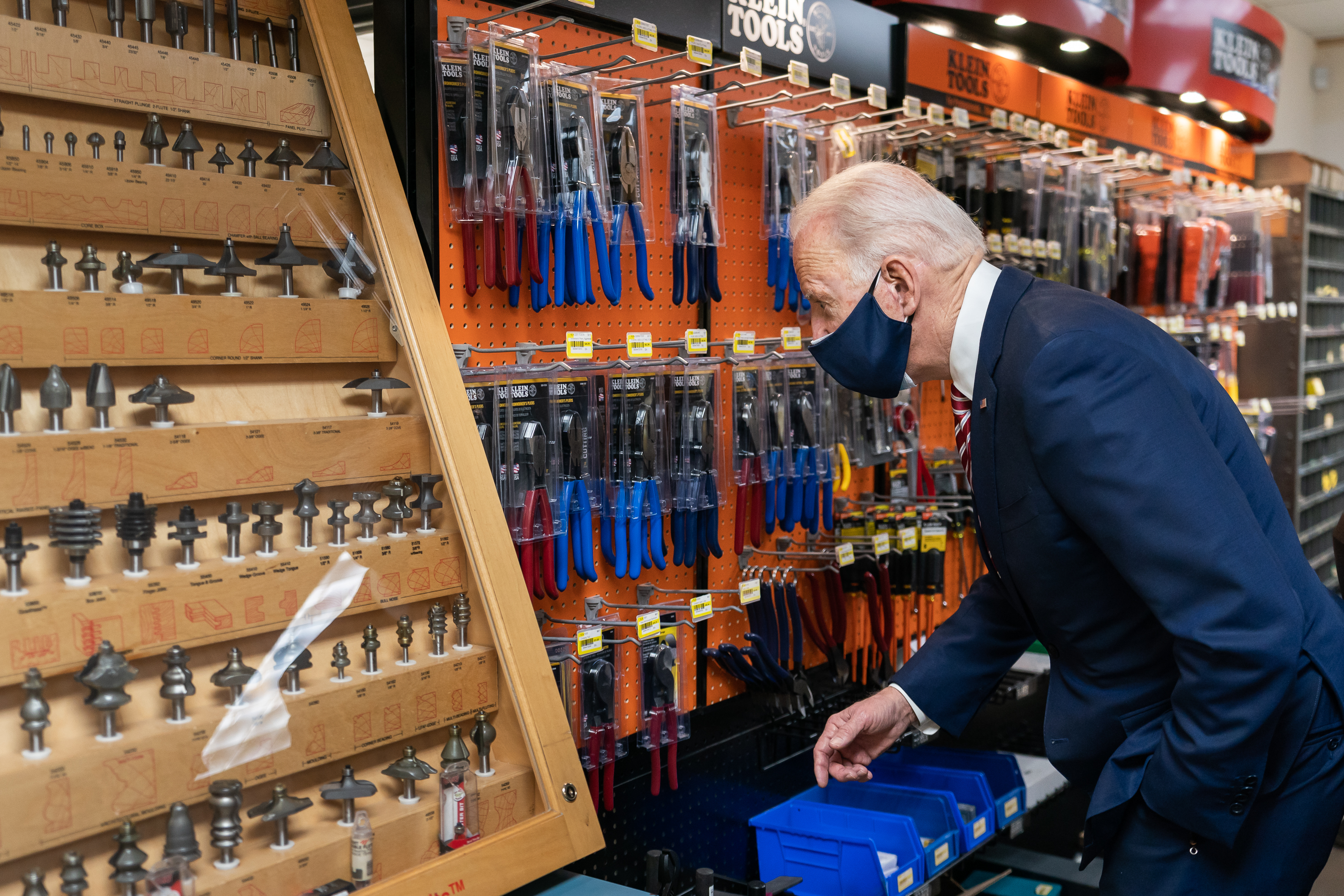
President Biden shops for pliers at a Washington, D.C. hardware store.
(Schultz, 2021)

The official portrait of President Trump for his second presidential term (Torok, 2025)
