= Yoichi Okamoto =

American photographer

- 岡本 陽一
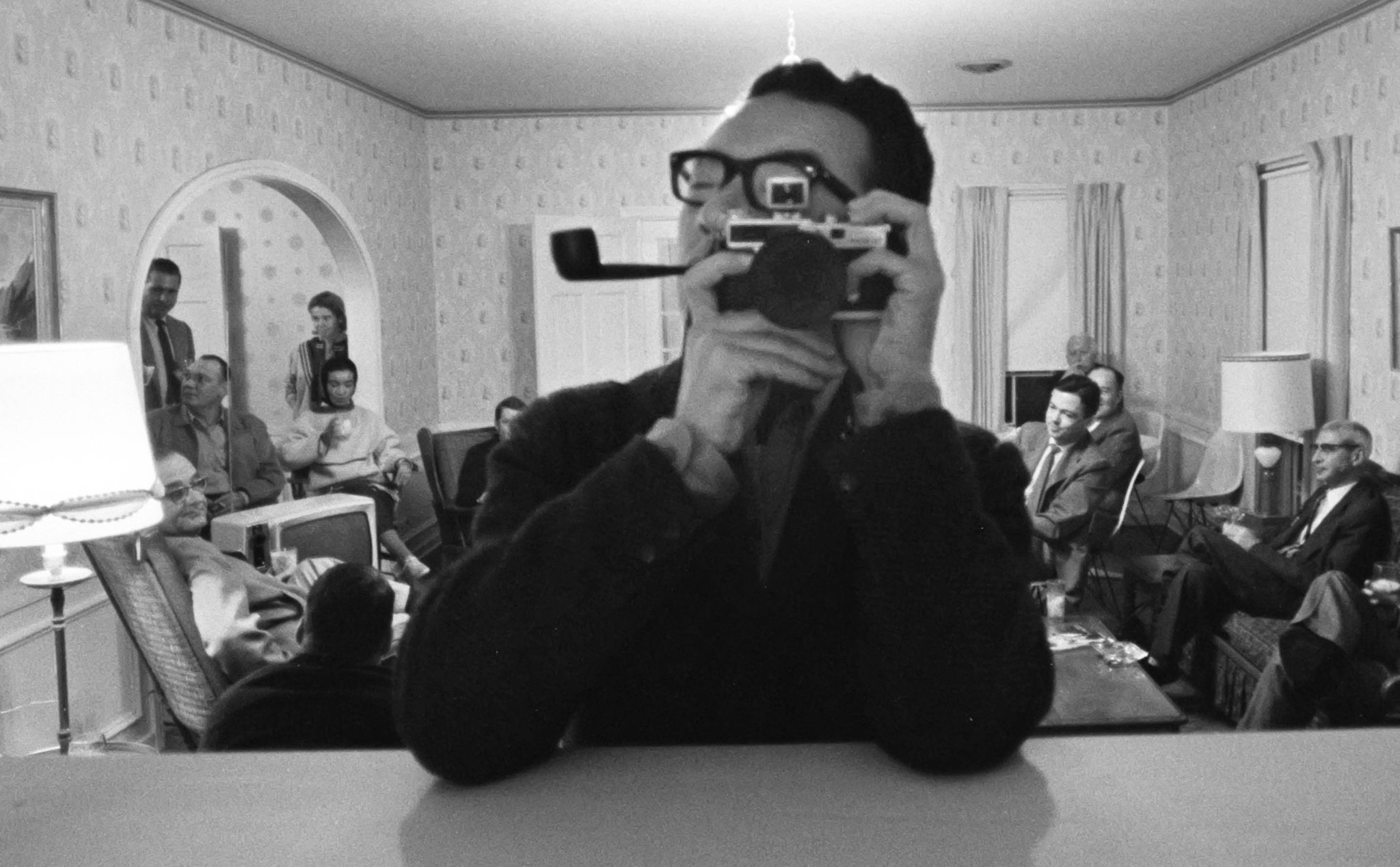
- Self-portrait at the L.B.J. Ranch, 1964

Chief Official White House Photographer
- In office 1963–1969
- President: Lyndon B. Johnson
- Preceded by: Cecil W. Stoughton
- Succeeded by: Oliver F. Atkins

Personal details
- Born: July 5, 1915 Yonkers, New York, U.S.
- Died: April 24, 1985 (aged 69) Bethesda, Maryland, U.S.
- Occupation: Photojournalist

Yoichi Robert Okamoto (Japanese: 岡本 陽一, Hepburn: Okamoto Yoichi; July 5, 1915 – April 24, 1985) was the first official U.S. presidential photographer, serving Lyndon B. Johnson.

== Early life ==
Okamoto was a native of Yonkers, New York. His father, Chobun Yonezo Okamoto, was a wealthy exporter, book publisher and real estate businessman who came from Japan to the United States in 1904. His mother's name was Shina. Okamoto spent three years in Japan as a child. He attended Roosevelt High School and Colgate University and served in the U.S. Army Signal Corps. During part of the time during World War II he was the official photographer of General Mark Clark. After the war, he joined the United States Information Agency.

== Career ==
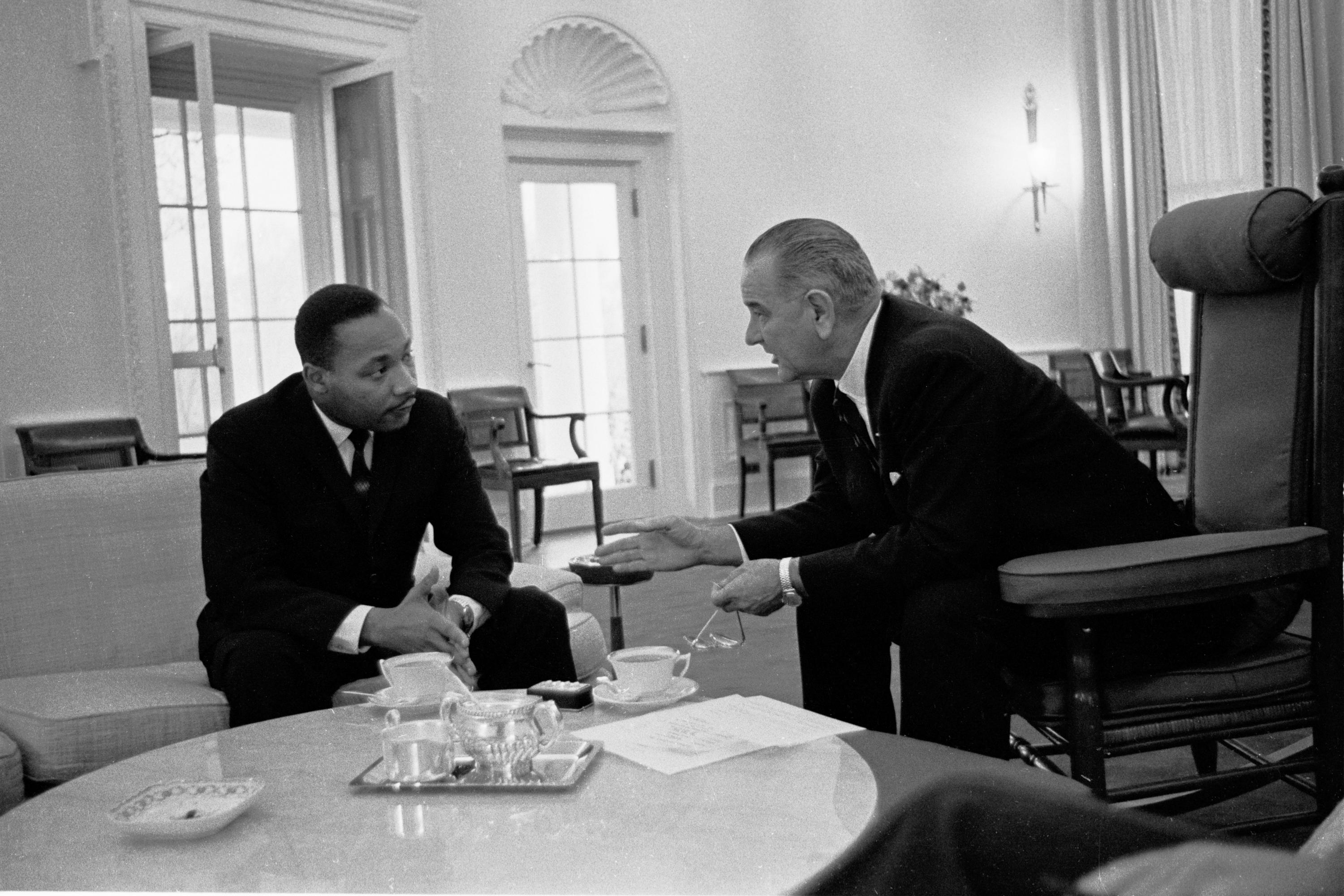
Johnson meeting with Martin Luther King Jr., 1963

In 1955 curator Edward Steichen chose Okamoto's United States Information Service photograph of Harald Kreutzberg for the world-touring Museum of Modern Art exhibition The Family of Man that was seen by 9 million visitors. His tightly cropped, three-quarter-face portrait, previously published in Popular Photography shows Kreutzberg at the 1950 Salzburg Festival in rehearsals for the performance of the play Jedermann by Hugo von Hofmannsthal in which Kreutzberg played the devil.

In 1961, Okamoto was invited to accompany then-Vice President Lyndon B. Johnson on a trip of Berlin as his official photographer. Admiring the photography from the trip, the Vice President requested that Okamoto be used for future events. When Johnson became president, he asked Okamoto to become the official photographer for the White House, which Okamoto accepted on condition that he would have unlimited access to the President. He was fondly known as "Oke", and was given unprecedented access to the Oval Office. He captured images of the President of the United States, more candid than had been previously acceptable.

Because of his ability to be present at almost any event, more photos of the Johnson presidency are available than from any earlier term of office. He took an estimated 675,000 photographs during the Johnson presidency. The 1990 coffee table book LBJ: The White House Years by Harry Middleton consists primarily of images taken by Okamoto.

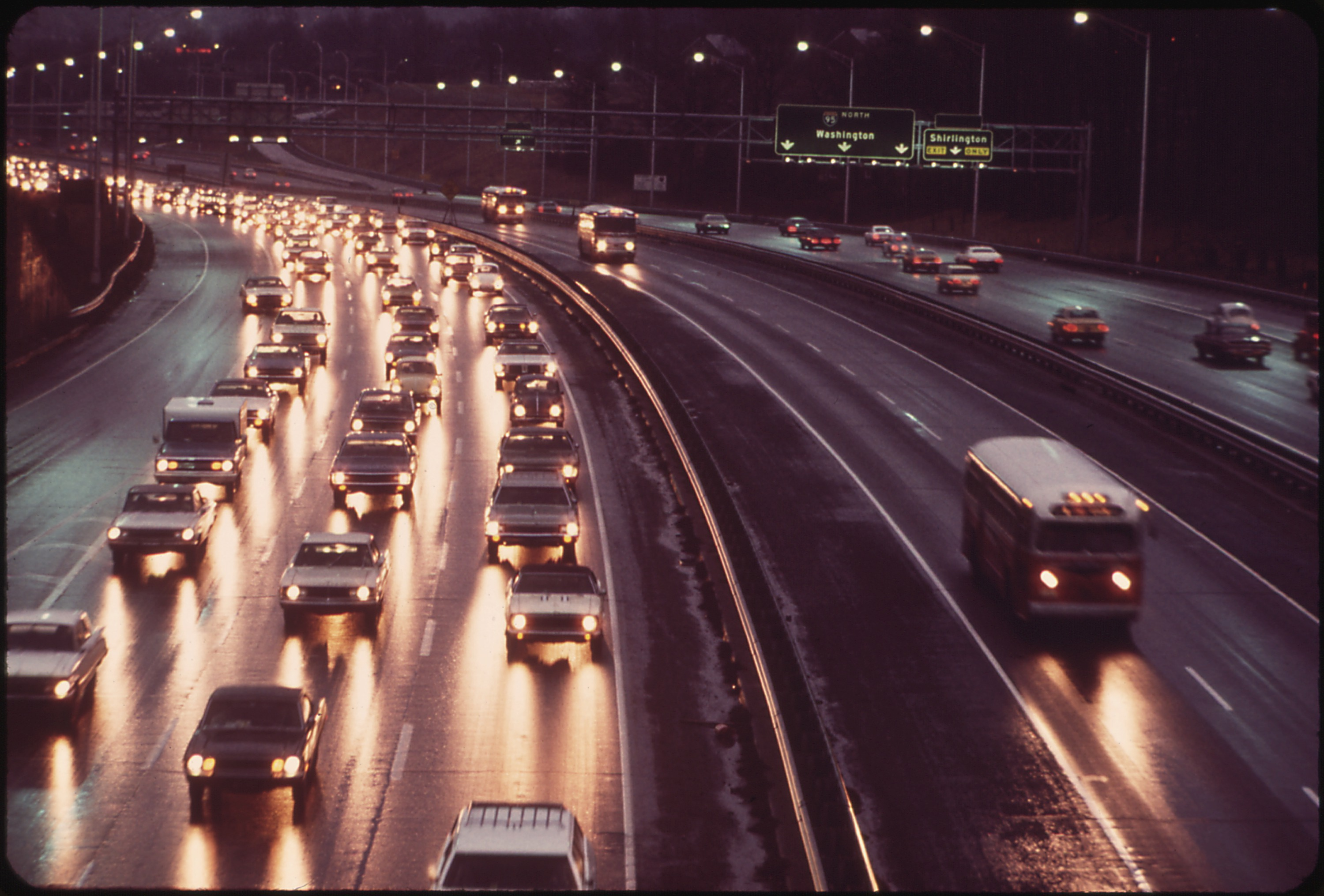
The Shirley Highway at rush hour, Documerica photograph, 1973

After finishing as the White House official photographer, Okamoto opened a private photofinishing business called Image Inc. in Washington D.C. He worked alongside his wife, Paula Okamoto.

== Personal life ==
He was married to wife, Paula, and had a step-daughter, Karin, and a son, Philip. Okamoto died by suicide at his home in Bethesda, Maryland on April 24, 1985, at the age of 69.
