= Oliver F. Atkins =

American photographer (1917–1977)

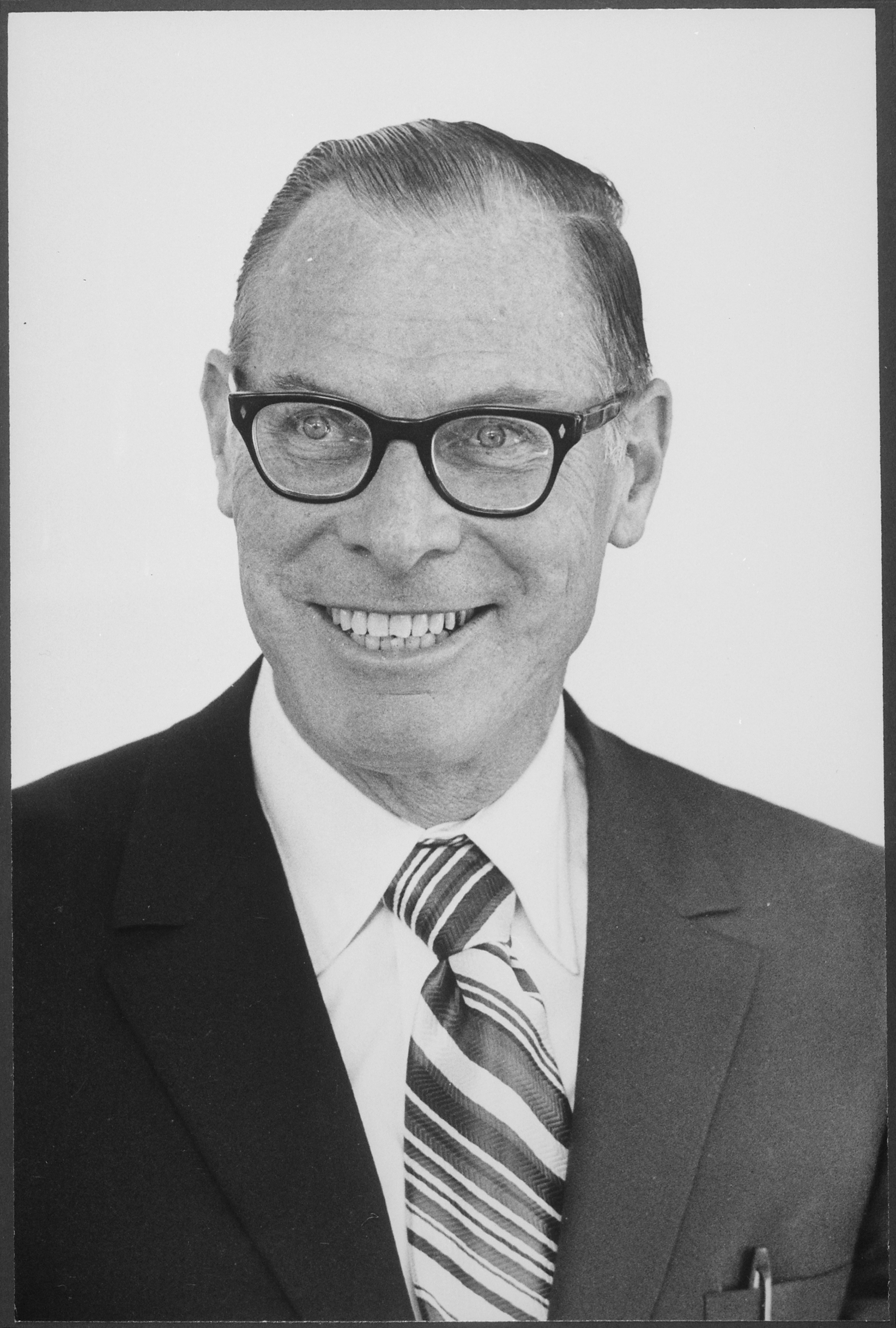
- Atkins in 1970

Chief Official White House Photographer
- In office 1969–1974
- President: Richard Nixon
- Preceded by: Yoichi Okamoto
- Succeeded by: David Hume Kennerly

Personal details
- Born: February 18, 1917 Hyde Park, Massachusetts, U.S.
- Died: January 24, 1977 (aged 59) Washington, Virginia, U.S.
- Occupation: Photojournalist

Oliver F. Atkins (February 18, 1917 – January 24, 1977) was an American photographer who worked for the Saturday Evening Post and as personal photographer to President Richard Nixon.

== Early life and career ==
Atkins was born in 1917 in Hyde Park, Massachusetts, and grew up in New York. He moved to the University of Alabama to get his BA in journalism, graduating in 1938. Taking a job at the Birmingham Post, he quickly rose through the ranks, becoming chief photographer for the paper. He left Alabama in 1940 to join the staff of The Washington Daily News.

== World War II ==
In 1942, after the United States entry into World War II, he began reporting for the American Red Cross. In that position, he covered such campaigns as the African campaign, the invasion of Sicily, the beachheads of Southern Italy, and the Allied invasions of Southern France and Germany.

== Postwar ==
When the war ended, he was a photographer for the Saturday Evening Post for which he traveled the world taking pictures of such historic figures as Josip Broz Tito, Charles de Gaulle, and Gamal Abdel Nasser.

=== Work with Nixon ===
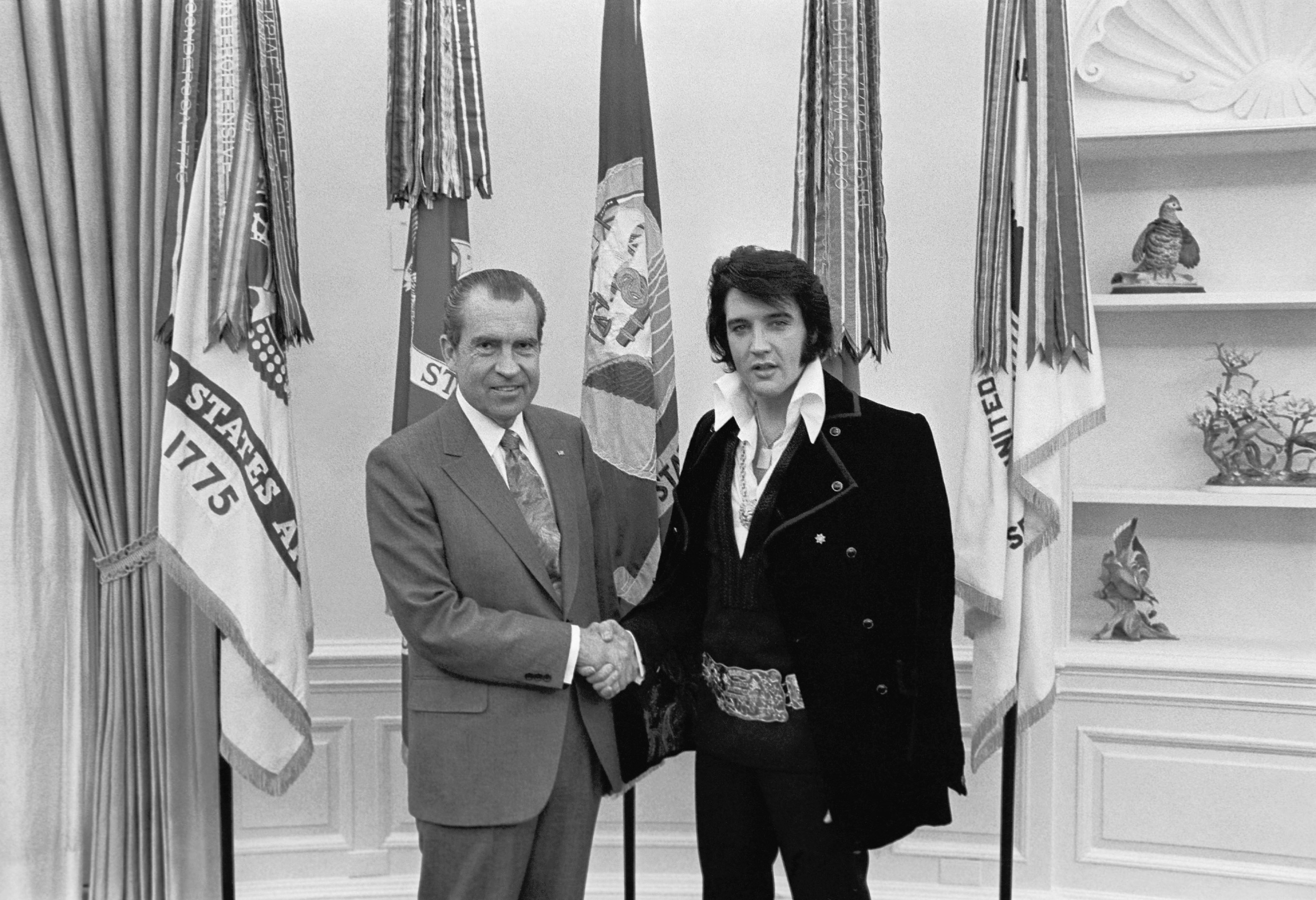
Nixon and Elvis in the Oval Office, 1970

When Nixon started campaigning for president in 1968, he became Nixon's personal photographer, following him on the campaign trail. When Nixon was elected, he joined the White House staff as official photographer. In that position, he took pictures of the president with many heads of state and celebrities. A secret meeting between Nixon and Elvis Presley is Atkins' most requested picture. Both Elvis and Nixon wanted to keep the meeting secret as Nixon's ratings were dropping and Elvis was planning a comeback; neither of their fans would understand a meeting between the two. The picture is now one of the most requested images in the National Archives and Records Administration, being more popular than the Bill of Rights or the Constitution of the United States.

While serving Nixon, Atkins was a member of the National Press Photographers Association. While a member of the Association, he was the head of its Freedom of Information Committee. After his work with Nixon in 1974, Atkins joined the Saturday Evening Post's publisher, Curtis Publishing Company of Indianapolis, becoming its vice president.

Atkins received several awards in recognition of his work and career, including the White House News Photographers' Association Grand Award, the Graflex All American Photo Contest Portrait Award, and the National Press Photographers' Association Personalities Award.

== Death and legacy ==
Atkins died of cancer in at his home in Washington, Virginia at the age of 59. The George Mason University Special Collections and Archives include approximately 60,000 of his photographs.

=== Notable photographs ===
Richard Nixon's resignation and farewell

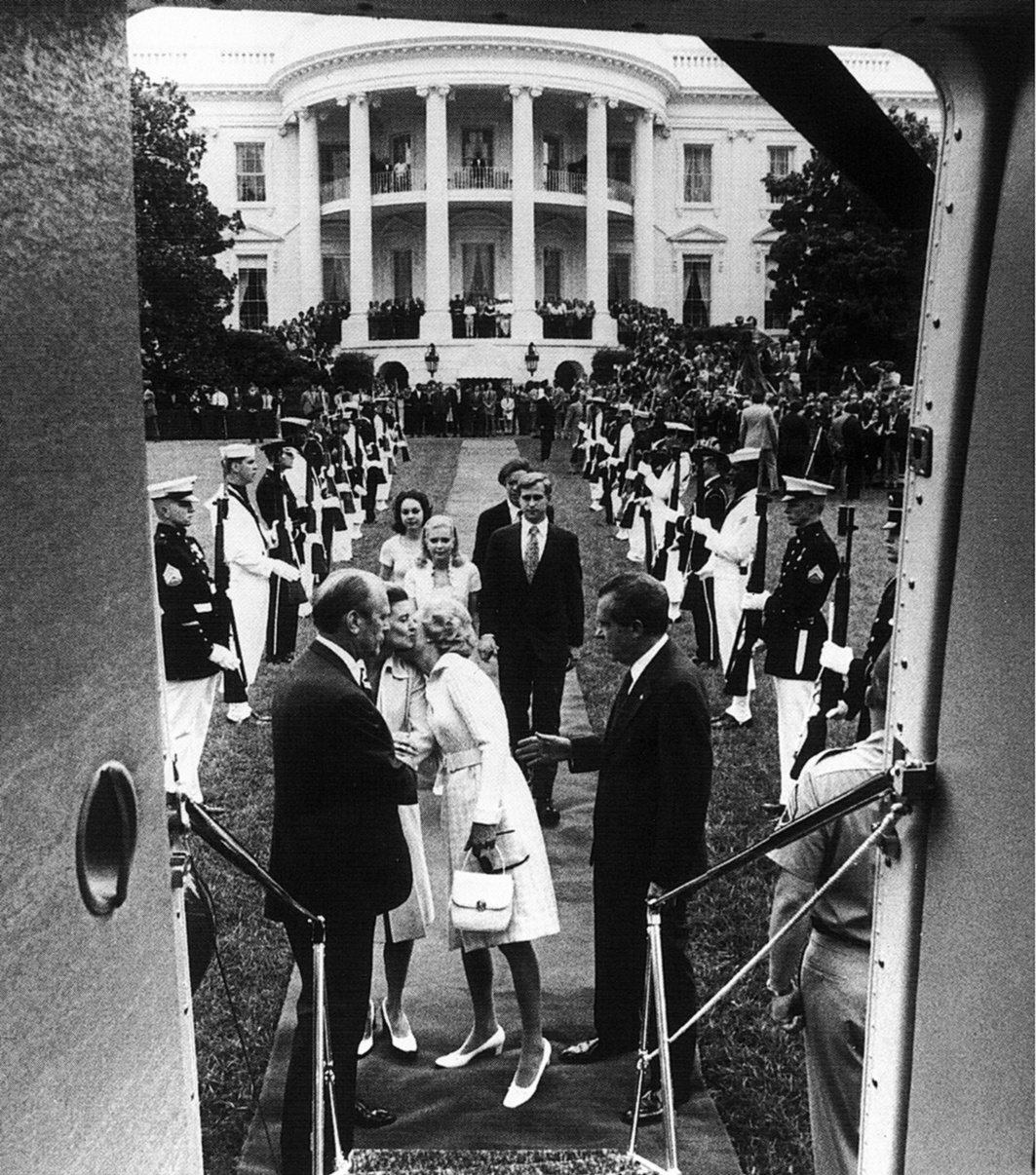
Nixon leaving the White House

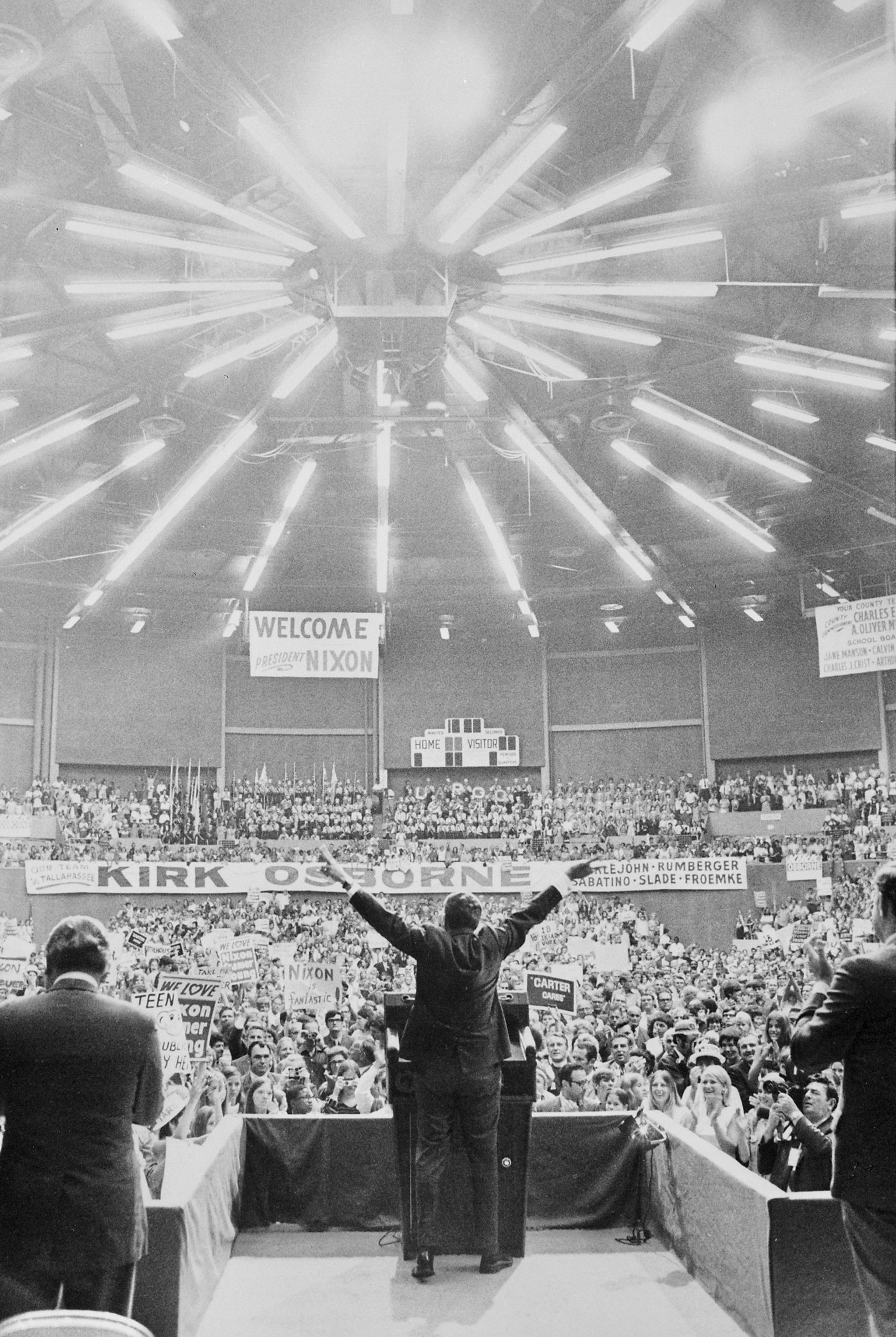
Nixon speaking to a crowd in Florida

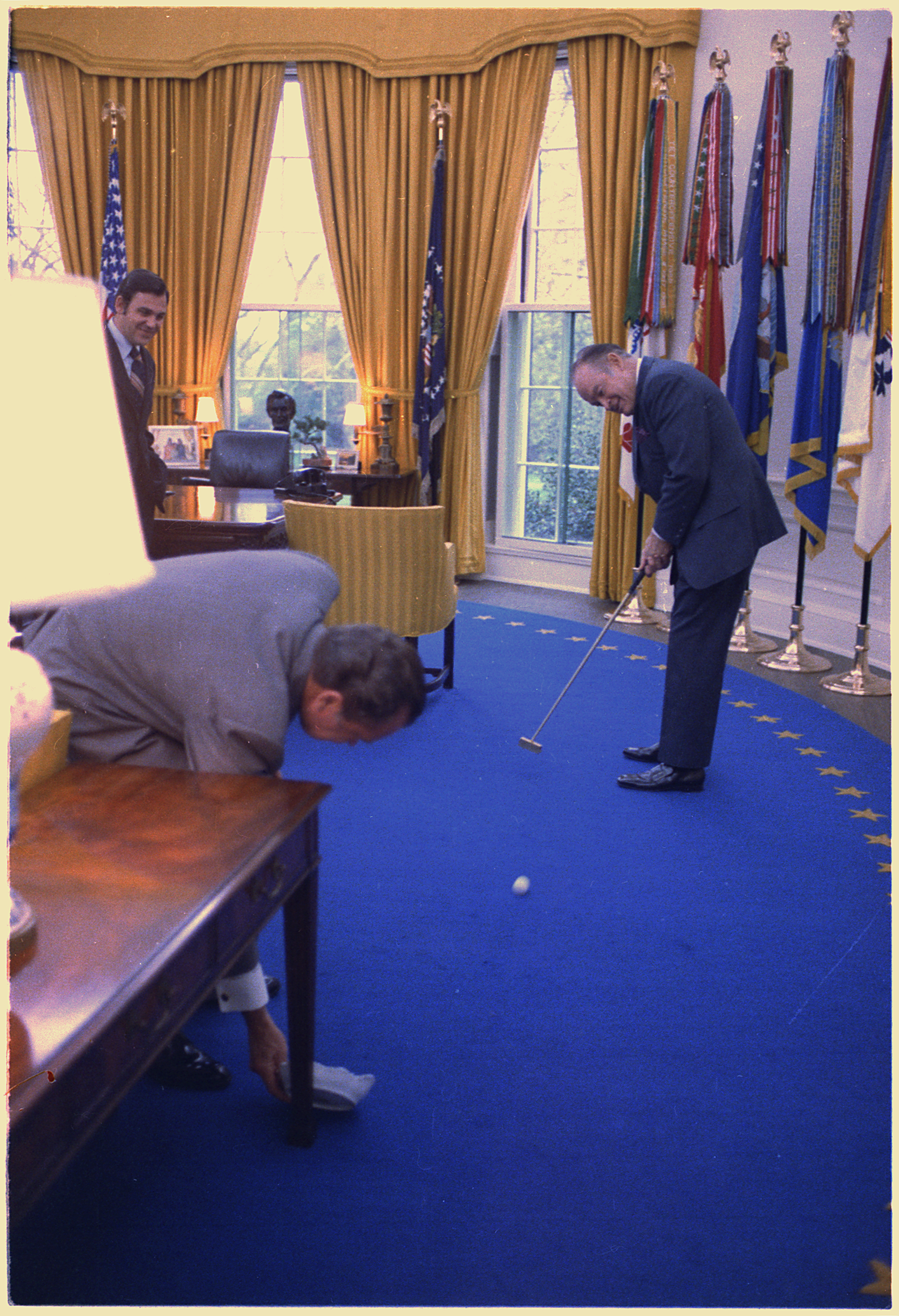
Bob Hope putting into an ashtray held by President Nixon

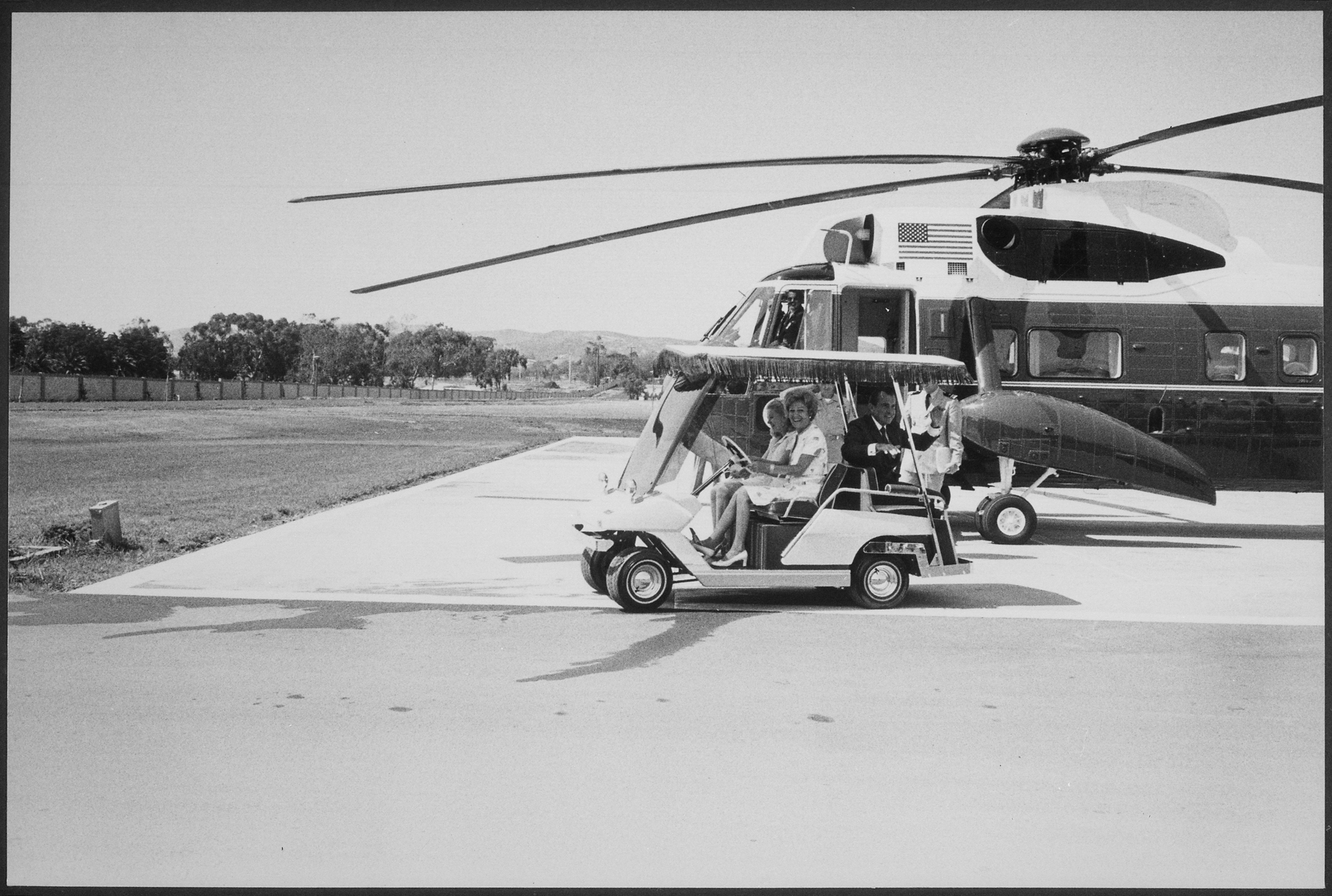
President and Mrs. Nixon and Tricia Nixon, on golf cart
