= Bob McNeely =

American photographer

Chief Official White House Photographer
- In office January 20, 1993 – September 1998
- President: Bill Clinton
- Preceded by: David Valdez
- Succeeded by: Sharon Farmer

Personal details
- Born: Robert McNeely; 1945 (age 80–81) Bath, New York, U.S.
- Party: Democratic
- Occupation: Photojournalist

Military service
- Allegiance: United States of America
- Branch/service: United States Army
- Years of service: 1968–1969
- Rank: Sergeant
- Unit: 60th Infantry Regiment
- Battles/wars: Vietnam War
- Awards: Bronze Star Medal

Robert McNeely (born 1945) is an American photographer, best known for being the Chief Official White House Photographer from 1993 to 1998, during the presidency of Bill Clinton.

== Life and career ==
=== Early career ===
McNeely was drafted into the Army in November 1967 when he was 21, and served in combat in the Vietnam War. He was there for fourteen months and was part of the 5th Battalion, 60th Infantry Regiment, where he attained the rank of sergeant, and earned a Bronze Star Medal. While there, he bought an inexpensive Nikon camera, started taking pictures and ended up running the Army photo lab. When he returned to the United States, he enrolled in a summer workshop at Aspen, Colorado, under the tutelage of professional photographers Nathan Lyons, Bruce Davidson, Cornell Capa and Paul Caponigro. This would be the only formal training he would receive, as he moved to California to follow the campaign trail of George McGovern, impressed with McGovern's opposition to the ongoing war in Vietnam. It was also around this time that he struck up a friendship with Hunter S. Thompson.

=== Political photojournalism ===
Following McGovern's defeat to Richard Nixon in the 1972 presidential election, McNeely pursued his career in photojournalism, with a further high point coming in 1973, as his photographs of the Nixon impeachment case were published in Time. McNeely was then appointed official campaign photographer for vice presidential nominee Walter Mondale, and after Jimmy Carter was inaugurated as President, McNeely kept his position as Mondale's official photographer. In 1980, when Carter and Mondale lost the election to Reagan and Bush, McNeely stepped away from the world of politics and went into the private sector as a photographer, working freelance for magazines such as Time and Newsweek.

=== Bill Clinton ===
In January 1992, former Carter White House staffers who had been working on the campaign trail of Bill Clinton, then Governor of Arkansas, contacted McNeely if he would be interested in covering it as well. McNeely was reluctant to do so, and suggested they hire a younger photographer, which they did. When Clinton accepted the Democratic nomination, McNeely thought that he had made a mistake in not taking the job. The next day, he was contacted again by the same people to tell him that the situation with the other photographer was not working out, so the job was re-offered to him. He had only an hour to decide, and afterwards, he would be a part of the campaign staff up until Election Day. He returned to the White House the following year, after Clinton's victory in the election.

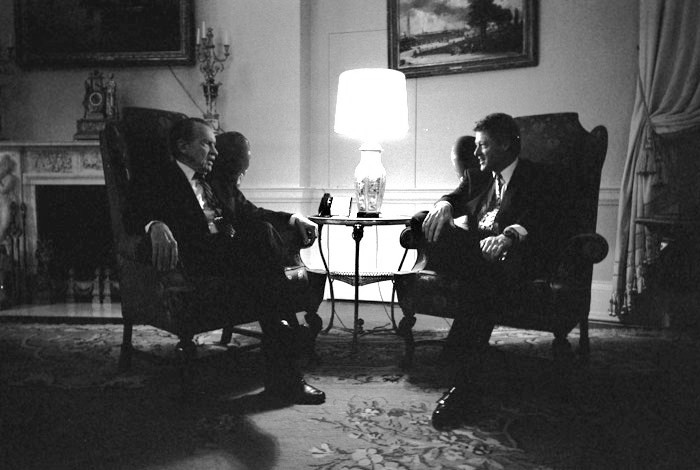
An example of McNeely's work, shot in his trademark black and white film, of Clinton meeting with former President Richard Nixon, 1993.

In November 1995, McNeely's photographs became a source of political leverage in the wake of the first federal government shutdown later that month. Israeli Prime Minister Yitzhak Rabin was assassinated during the ongoing disagreements over the budget, and a delegation consisting of Clinton, Vice President Gore, Speaker of the House Gingrich and Majority Senate Leader Dole amongst others flew aboard Air Force One to the funeral. Gingrich complained that he was not able to discuss the budget and was sent to the back of the plane, so he shut down the government in retaliation. McNeely remembered that he had taken pictures of Clinton and Gingrich together on the flight back to Washington, and showed them to Press Secretary Mike McCurry, who saw the potential in outsmarting Gingrich. McNeely made multiple prints of the perceived incident and left them in the media briefing room in the West Wing, where they were taken by journalists. Once the photographs were published, the press criticized Gingrich for his false claim.

Around the same time, McNeely realized that he had been, unwittingly, a witness to a small part of the Clinton–Lewinsky scandal. When Clinton met with staff members in a meeting, he gestured to the photographer to take a picture of him and the intern. McNeely did so, and thought nothing of it, but after additional information had become widely known, he surmised that Lewinsky had performed oral sex on the President earlier that day. While McNeely had previously been granted unprecedented access to the White House, he was barred in the fallout of the scandal, as the Clintons were worried that the photographs could be subpoenaed by Ken Starr (although some of which eventually made it into the hands of the independent counsel). He was also excluded from meetings with lawyers in fear that he might testify on what he had heard, and frustrated over the focus of the President's personal life, quit the position in September 1998, citing a desire to be with his family.

=== Post-White House work ===
In October 2000, McNeely published his first photobook, The Clinton Years, the first time a book was published with the subject still in office, and as such, the White House also had a say in what photographs were used. However, as the book was printed at a press in mainland China, it had been held up when authorities realized that there was a photograph of Clinton meeting with the Dalai Lama. They confiscated the entire press run, threatening to destroy the books unless the offending photograph was removed, but they relented at the last minute and the book was released. In the same year, McNeely was the official campaign photographer for Hillary Clinton's successful senate campaign, and also followed Democratic, Republican and third party presidential nominees around the country, in a project entitled Politics 2000.
