= Eric Draper =

American photographer

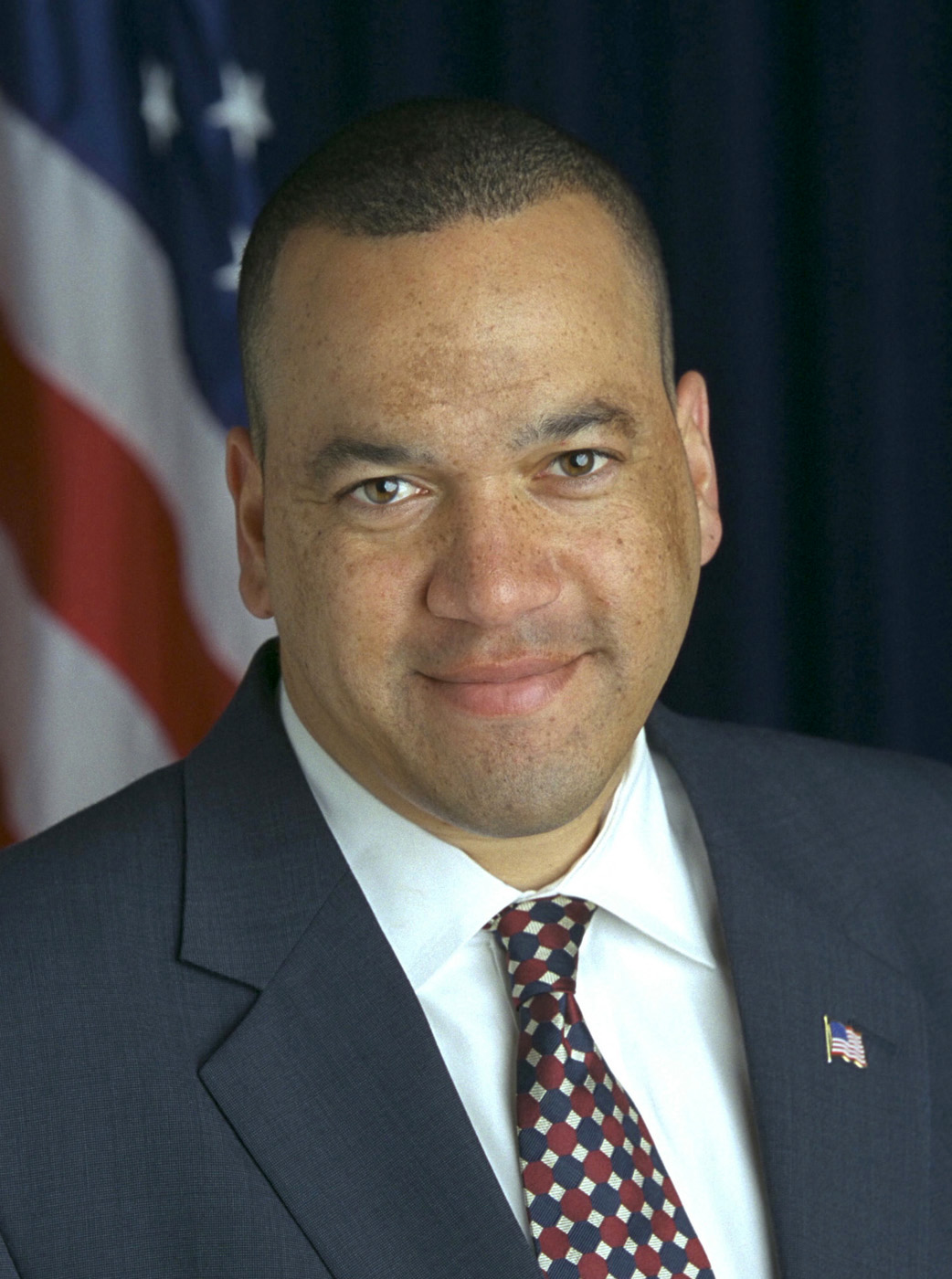

Chief Official White House Photographer
- In office January 20, 2001 – January 20, 2009
- President: George W. Bush
- Preceded by: Sharon Farmer
- Succeeded by: Pete Souza

Personal details
- Born: September 9, 1964 (age 62) Los Angeles, California, U.S.
- Occupation: Photojournalist

Eric Draper (born 9 September 1964) is an American news photographer who also worked as the White House photo director and personal photographer for U.S. President George W. Bush.

== Biography and career ==
Born and raised in Los Angeles, Draper worked for the Associated Press as a news photographer prior to joining the White House. His assignments included the 1996 and 2000 presidential campaigns, the 2000 Summer Olympics in Sydney, Australia, the Kosovo conflict in 1999 and the 1998 FIFA World Cup in France.

Over the years, Draper has also worked as a staff photographer for The Seattle Times, the Pasadena Star-News and the Albuquerque Tribune.

Draper is a graduate of Cerritos College and California State University, Long Beach.

== Awards ==
Draper won the Associated Press Managing Editors' Award for three consecutive years, the 1999 National Headliner Award and was named 1992 Photographer of the Year by Scripps-Howard Newspapers for "Seeing Through the Flames", which was his coverage of the 1992 Los Angeles riots.

== Books ==
In April 2013, Draper released his collection of White House photos in Front Row Seat: A Photographic Portrait of the Presidency of George W. Bush. The book presents a behind-the-scenes view of the Bush presidency through Draper's photographs, from Bush's everyday moments to historically significant scenes of crisis, most especially September 11, 2001. Time's LightBox said, "Draper's portrait of Bush is authentic." The Washington Post noted, "Draper's book provides a unique and intimate look into his relationship with former President George W. Bush over eight dramatic years that changed America."

== Personal ==
Draper lives in New Mexico where is now an independent political, corporate and editorial photographer. He lives with his wife and two dogs, and is a fan of the Los Angeles Lakers.
