= Shealah Craighead =

American government photographer (born 1976)

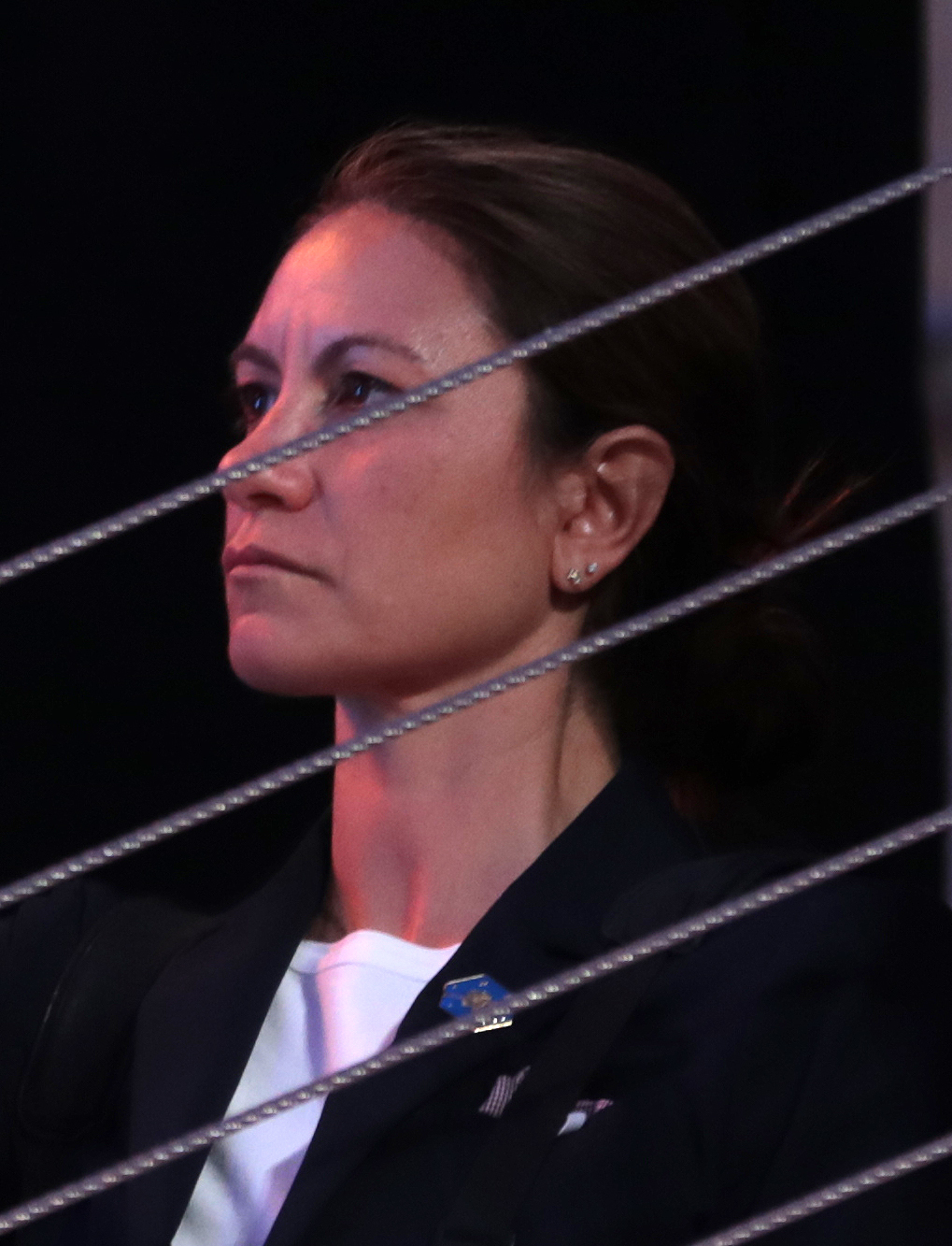
- Craighead in 2020

Chief Official White House Photographer
- In office January 20, 2017 – January 20, 2021
- President: Donald Trump
- Preceded by: Pete Souza
- Succeeded by: Adam Schultz

Personal details
- Born: September 25, 1976 (age 50) Connecticut, U.S.
- Education: Lesley University (BFA)

Shealah Craighead (born September 25, 1976) is an American government photographer who served as the Chief Official White House Photographer for Donald Trump's first presidency. She was the second female chief photographer in White House history, after Sharon Farmer in 1998. Craighead was official photographer to former First Lady Laura Bush in the administration of George W. Bush.

== Early life and family ==
Craighead was born on September 25, 1976, in Connecticut where her parents owned a photo lab. As she grew up, Craighead said she "had always wanted to do something that involved traveling the world and living in hotels. And that involved photography." She wanted to work in Washington, D.C.

== Career ==
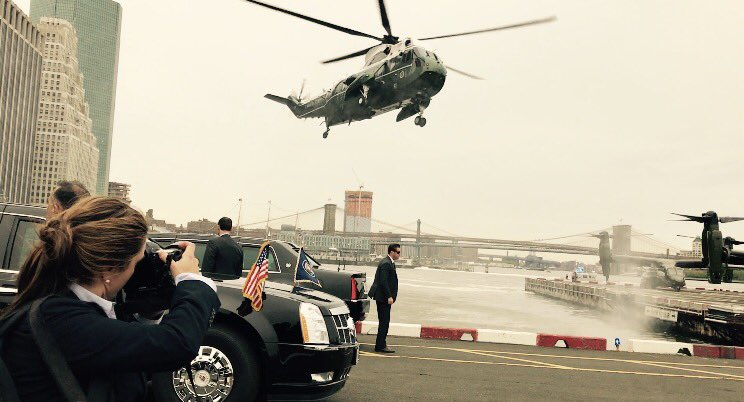
Craighead photographing Marine One in 2017

Craighead attended Belmont University and earned a BFA from Lesley University in 2002. After college, she worked as a freelance photographer for the Boston Globe, Associated Press, and Getty Images. In 2005, she worked for David Bohrer, the official photographer for Vice President Dick Cheney.

Craighead became the official photographer to First Lady Laura Bush during the George W. Bush administration and photographed Jenna Bush Hager's wedding in 2008. That same year, Craighead became the campaign photographer for Sarah Palin. She also worked for senators Kay Bailey Hutchison and Marco Rubio during his presidential campaign and Senate career.

In 2017, Craighead was named the official White House photographer for Donald Trump. The Trump administration employed a total of four photographers with different specialties including fashion, military, and administration.

During the 2019 Koreas–United States DMZ Summit, when Trump became the first sitting US president to enter North Korea, Craighead made "a split-second decision" to cross the border line to photograph Trump with North Korean chairman Kim Jong Un.

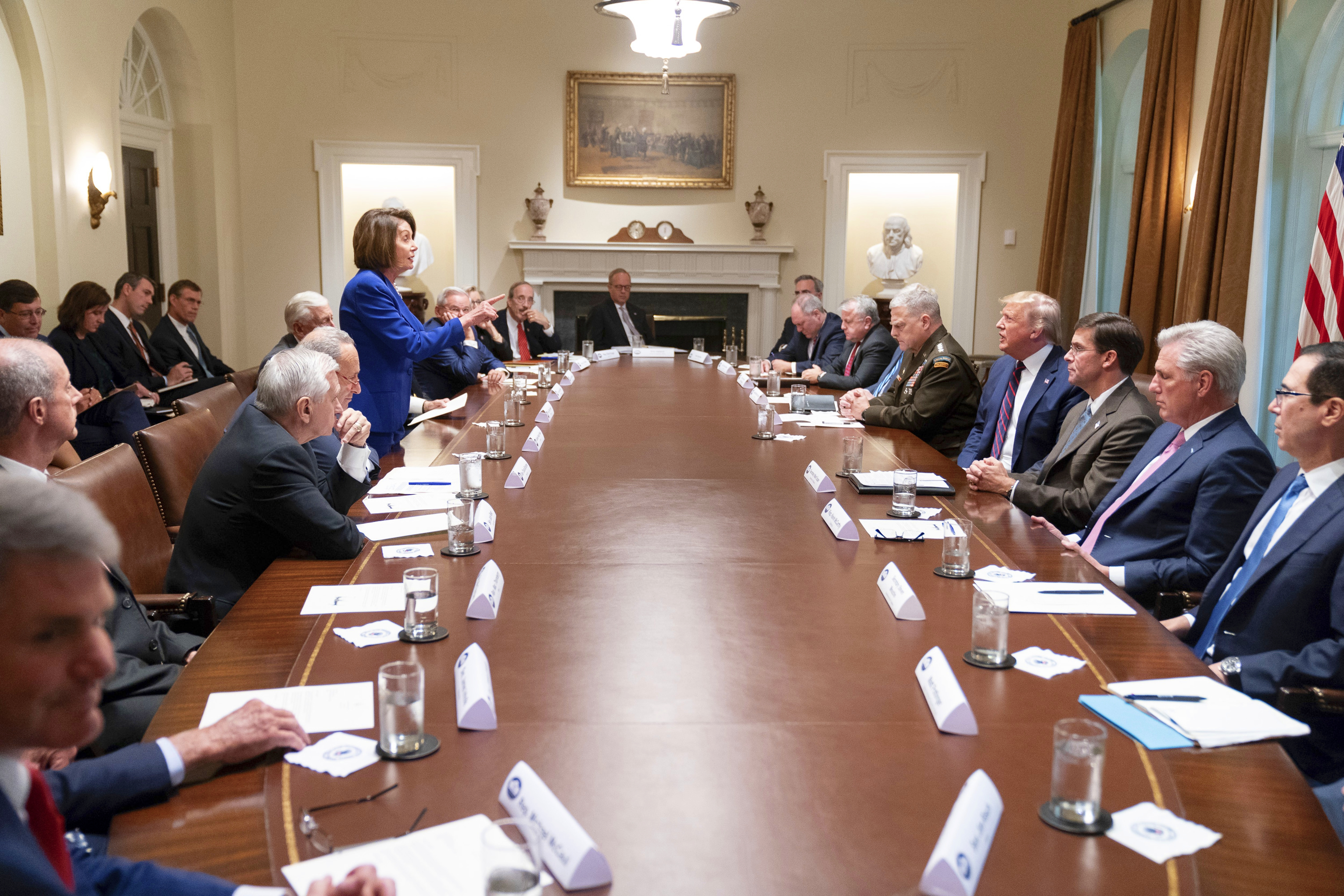
The confrontation between Pelosi and Trump in 2019

Craighead photographed Nancy Pelosi standing to address a seated Trump in an October 2019 meeting at the White House, which attracted media attention. She later remarked that Trump liked to "control the lighting, the production, and the show basically", and that he preferred posed over candid photographs.

After he left office, Trump used many photographs taken by Craighead to produce a book, but did not credit her work or that of other photographers.

In addition to photographing politicians, she has also worked for corporations in the private sector.

Craighead uses a stool while taking photos as she is 5 feet 2 inches (1.57 m) tall.
