= Daniel Torok =

American photographer and filmmaker

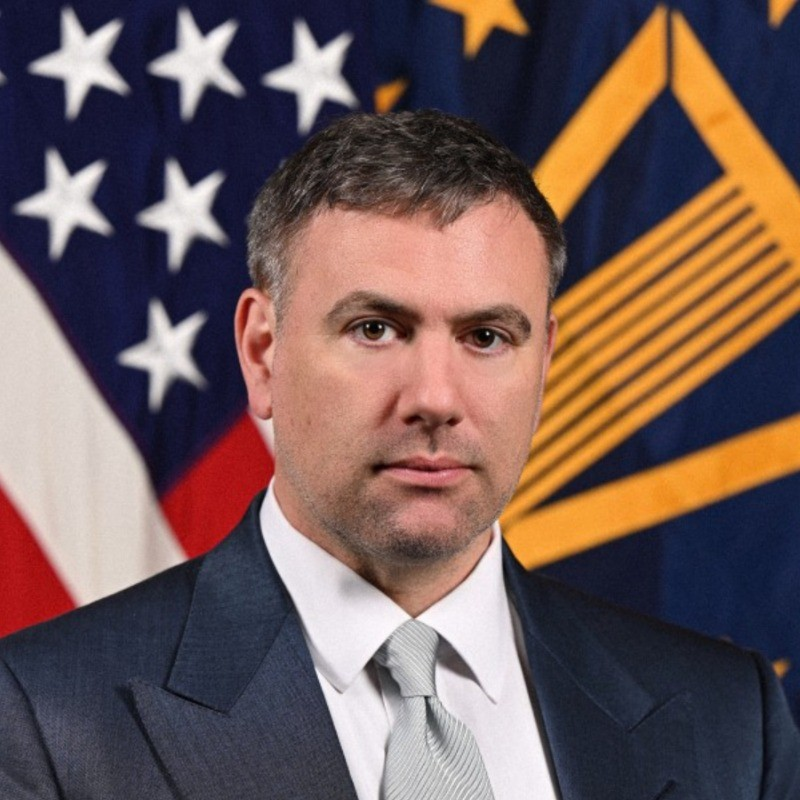
- Official portrait, 2025

Chief Official White House Photographer
- Incumbent
- Assumed office January 20, 2025
- President: Donald Trump
- Preceded by: Adam Schultz

Personal details
- Born: 1982 (age 43–44) New York City, U.S.
- Party: Republican
- Occupation: Photographer; filmmaker

Military service
- Branch/service: United States Coast Guard

Daniel Torok (born 1982) is an American photographer and filmmaker. He is serving as the chief official White House photographer since 2025, during the second presidency of Donald Trump.

== Biography ==
Torok is a native of New York. Prior to his career in media creation, in 2004, he served in the United States Coast Guard.

Torok was a filmmaker before he became a photographer. In 2012, he cast the music video for the song "Same Love" by Macklemore & Ryan Lewis. The next year, he directed a documentary film titled The Otherside about the Seattle hip-hop scene.

In 2025, he became the chief official White House photographer under United States president Donald Trump. Trump's inaugural portrait was Torok's first time using studio lighting. Torok took inspiration for the inaugural portrait from Trump's 2023 mug shot and lit Trump from below to make use of catch light. Torok also took Trump's presidential portrait in June 2025.
