= David Valdez (photographer) =

American photographer

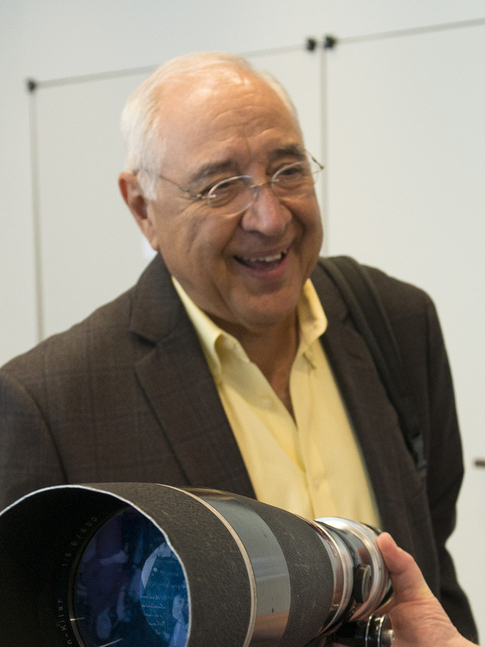
- Valdez in 2016

Chief Official White House Photographer
- In office January 20, 1989 – January 20, 1993
- President: George H. W. Bush
- Preceded by: Pete Souza
- Succeeded by: Bob McNeely

Personal details
- Born: June 1, 1949 (age 77) Alice, Texas, U.S.
- Spouse: Sarah Jane Valdez
- Education: University of Maryland
- Occupation: Photographer

David Valdez (born June 1, 1949) is an American photographer, best known for being the Chief Official White House Photographer from 1989 to 1993, during the presidency of George H. W. Bush.

== Early life ==
Valdez was born on June 1, 1949, to Israel Valdez Sr. (formerly of the Army Air Corps), and Alicia Saldaña Valdez in Alice, Texas. His family had emigrated from Mexico when the King Ranch started transporting cattle north of the border.

Following his graduation from high school in 1967, Valdez was drafted into the Air Force, where he was told he was going be a field photographer. He was stationed at MacDill Air Force Base in Tampa, Florida. He worked for the base newspaper and often photographed generals during the Vietnam War at Strike Command headquarters. He was also put in charge of other servicemen, which he put on his resume as 'supervisor', hoping that it would help him in the long run.

Valdez left the service in 1971, and went on to attend the University of Maryland, where he majored in journalism and radio and television production.

== Career ==
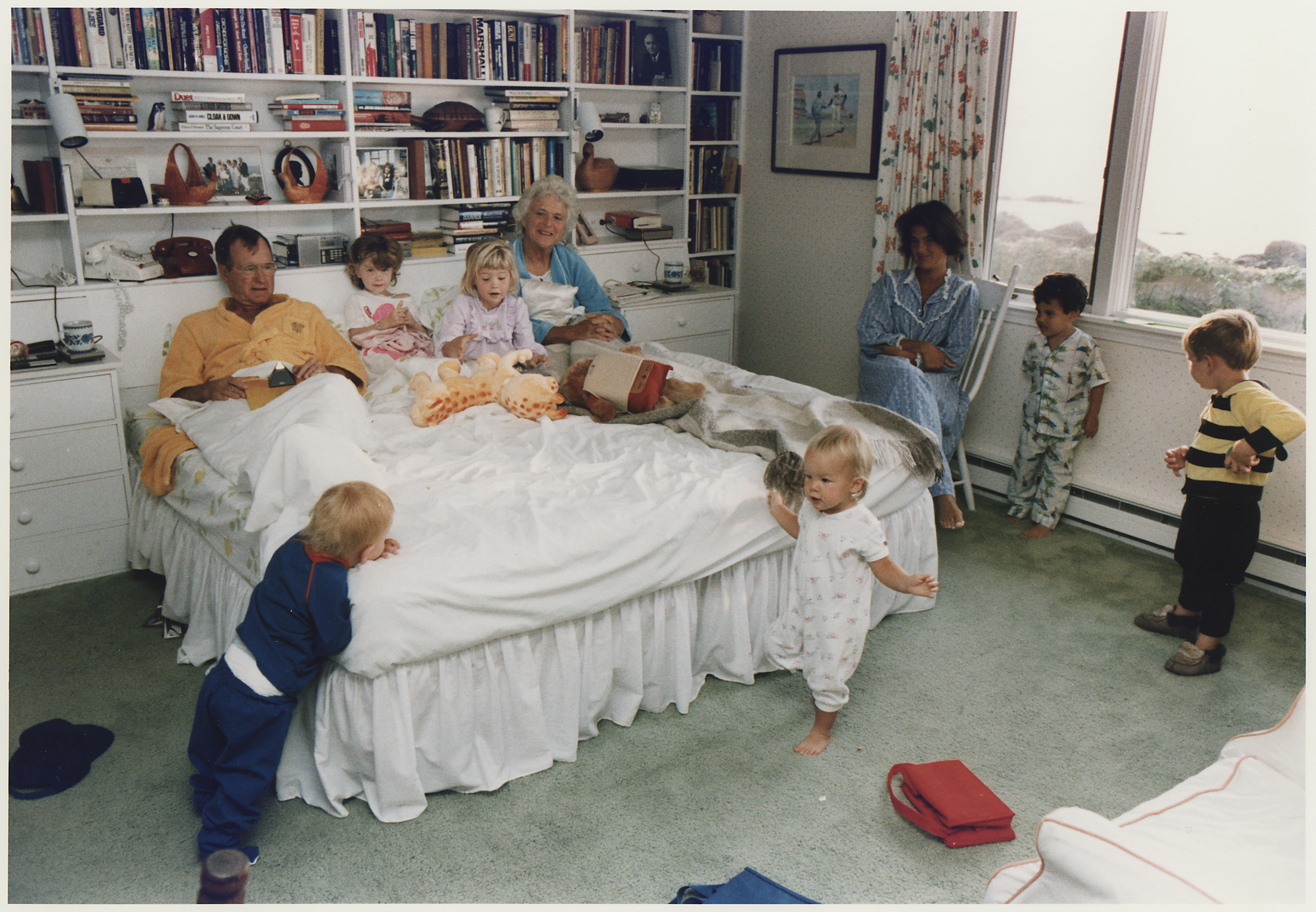
Valdez's pphotograph of Vice President Bush and his wife Barbara surrounded by their grandchildren and daughter-in-law, Margaret Molster Bush, 1987.

After his graduation from the University of Maryland, he worked as a photographer for the United States Department of Agriculture and the United States Department of Housing and Urban Development, as well as chief photographer for Nation’s Business, the in-house magazine at the United States Chamber of Commerce. However, soon after taking the job at Nation’s Business, Valdez saw an opening in the Vice President's office. He sent a cold letter to Vice President Bush's press secretary, and was then interviewed by Daniel J. Murphy, Bush's chief of staff, before being interviewed by Bush himself. Bush told Valdez about the relationship between Vice President and photographer, and the trust between them. When Valdez inquired about a salary, Bush did not know, and so called out Murphy who was working in a nearby room. Murphy replied, "What's he asking you about a salary!" Ultimately, Valdez was hired as Bush's photographer.

Valdez's most famous photograph of Bush came in the summer of 1987. He had been requested by Life to shoot a candid picture of the Vice President on vacation. Initially, Bush was against the idea, but relented when he realized Valdez's involvement. By now, Valdez was exceptionally close with the Bush family, and was invited by Barbara Bush to Walker's Point in Kennebunkport, Maine. The photograph, taken at 6 a.m., shows the Bushes in bed, with six of their grandchildren, alongside Marvin Bush's wife Margaret. It was an instant hit, as Life put the image across its pages and later reprinted it in special editions of the magazine. It is also by far, Valdez's most republished image of his career, and in an interview with NBC News, he felt the way it resonated with the general public was that it was in line with what Bush always said were the most important things in life – family, faith and friends.

In 1989, after Bush's inauguration as President, Valdez was appointed as the President's photographer and director of the White House Photo Office. Valdez later commented that under the Reagan administration, the White House Photo Office released two or three photo releases per day, compared to the G. H. W. Bush administration, which did away with the controlling nature of the previous regime, allowing photographers from news organizations to record their own photos of White House events alongside the White House Photo Office staff. Valdez reportedly took 65,000 rolls of film of the President during his time at the White House.

From 1993 to 2001, Valdez headed the photography department for Disney in Florida, ushering in the transition from film to digital. He also published a picture book, George Herbert Walker Bush: A Photographic Profile, which was released in 1997. In 2002, he was made Vice President of Business Development at Blue Pixel Digital Experts. He later returned to Washington in two roles: the first, as the Special Assistant to the Assistant Secretary for Public Affairs, during the presidency of George W. Bush, and the second, to work for HUD again.

Valdez officially retired in 2010, but freelances for the LBJ Presidential Library and the National Park Service at the LBJ Ranch, in addition to his active speaking and consulting career. In 2014, Valdez was called upon by the Bush family to photograph George P. Bush in his successful campaign for Texas Land Commissioner. Having photographed three generations of the Bush family, Valdez told the Georgetown View that this was "kind of neat".

Valdez's work is archived at the George Bush Presidential Library in College Station, Texas, and at the U.S. National Archives at College Park, Maryland, with his personal collection kept at the Briscoe Center in Austin, Texas. Valdez spent 4 years on the Georgetown Texas Arts and Culture Board, the last 2 as the Chairman of the Board. He is also the Vice President of the Board of the Williamson Museum. Valdez has received recognition as the Trustee of the Year from the Texas Association of Museums, Received recognition as a Points of Light Honoree and awarded the Congressional Veterans Commendation Award from Congressman John Carter. He is also the Founder of the Texas Photography Festival.

=== George Herbert Walker Bush: A Photographic Profile ===
George Herbert Walker Bush: A Photographic Profile is a 1997 book of photographs published by the Texas A&M University Press. Andrew Delbanco of The New York Times described it as "a feel-good album ranging from boyhood photos to snapshots of the grandkids."

The Public News of Houston praised Valdez's "fine eye for composition and the historical moment" and also "beauty and humor", but it criticized the lack of captions of the photographs, stating that this means no information or context is provided about them, and therefore criticizing the editing.

== Personal life ==
Valdez is married to Sarah Jane; the couple have no children. They reside in Georgetown, Texas.
