= Michael Evans (photographer) =

American photographer

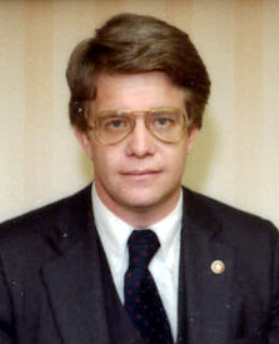
- Evans in 1981

Chief Official White House Photographer
- In office 1981–1985 Serving with Pete Souza (from June 1983)
- President: Ronald Reagan
- Preceded by: David Hume Kennerly (1977)
- Succeeded by: Pete Souza (Note: As sole office holder)

Personal details
- Born: Michael Arthur Worden Evans; June 21, 1944 St. Louis, Missouri, U.S.
- Died: December 1, 2005 (aged 61) Atlanta, Georgia, U.S.
- Spouses: Linda Forde (m. 1967; div. 1975) Story Shem (m. 1983)
- Children: 6
- Occupation: Photojournalist

Michael Arthur Worden Evans (June 21, 1944 – December 1, 2005) was an American newspaper, magazine, and presidential photographer. He was Ronald Reagan's personal photographer during his first term as president from 1981 through 1985. Evans is best remembered for his 1976 iconic photo of Ronald Reagan wearing a cowboy hat taken while Evans was working for Equus Magazine, which circulated the covers of numerous magazines in the week following Reagan's death in 2004. He was nominated for a Pulitzer Prize while shooting for The New York Times.

== Life and career ==
Born in St. Louis, Missouri, Evans was the son of a Canadian diplomat, Arthur Worden Evans, and a registered nurse, Audrey Evans, née Grant-Dalton. Evans lived in Havana, Cuba, and Cape Town, South Africa, in his youth. He attended Trinity College School in Port Hope, Ontario, Canada, where he was the photo editor of the TCS Record in 1962. His first job at the age of 15 was at the Port Hope Evening Guide in Ontario, Canada; After TCS he attended Queen's University in Kingston Ontario where he was the photo editor of the Queen's Tricolor year book in 1964 and was the Editor in 1965. He then worked as a photographer for The Plain Dealer in Cleveland, Ohio, The New York Times and Time magazine.

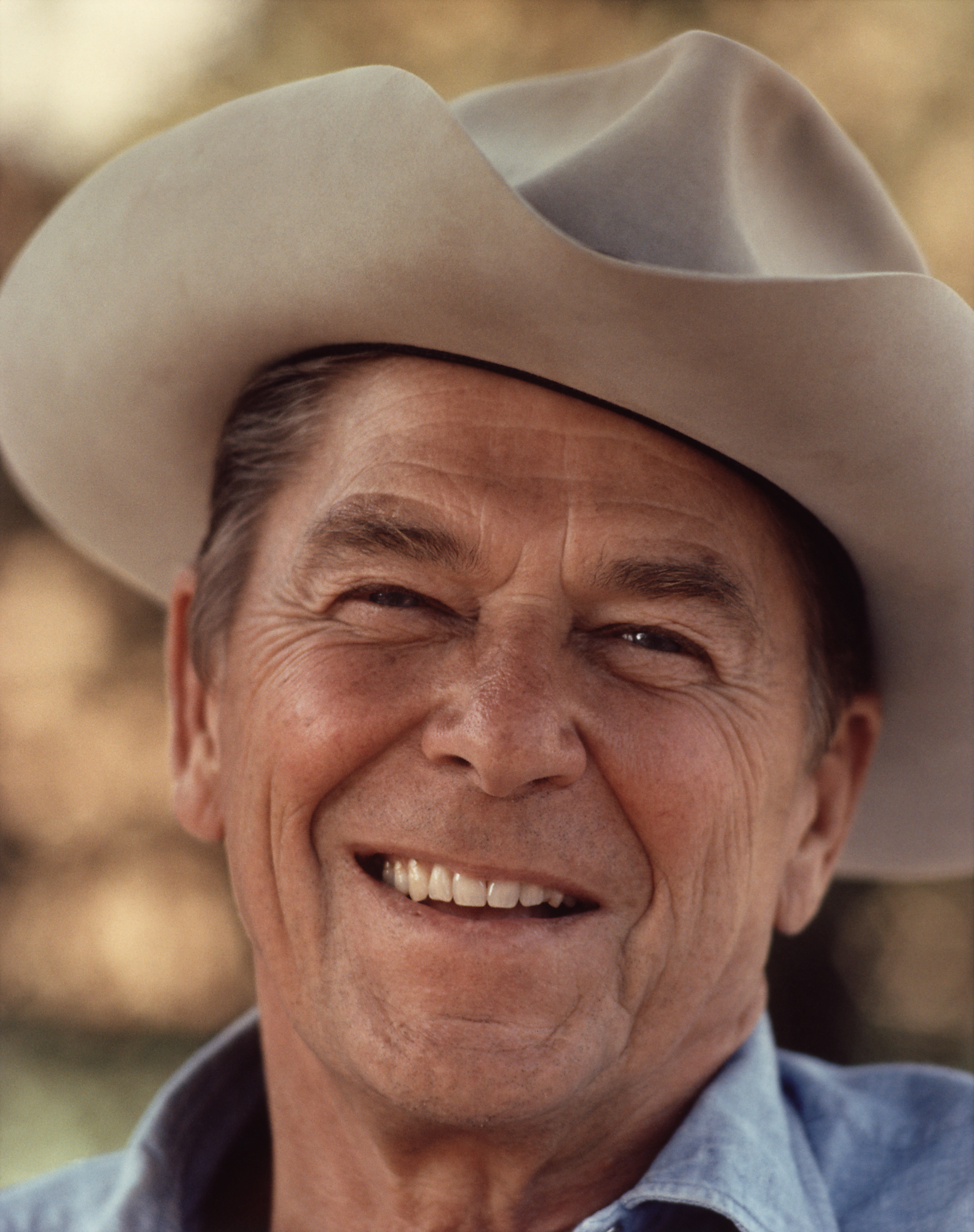
Evans' photo of Ronald Reagan, 1976

He began shooting Reagan as a photographer for Time, when Reagan first ran for the Republican nomination for president. Evans continued to document his political career, moving to Washington, D.C., in 1980 as the White House Photographer for four years.

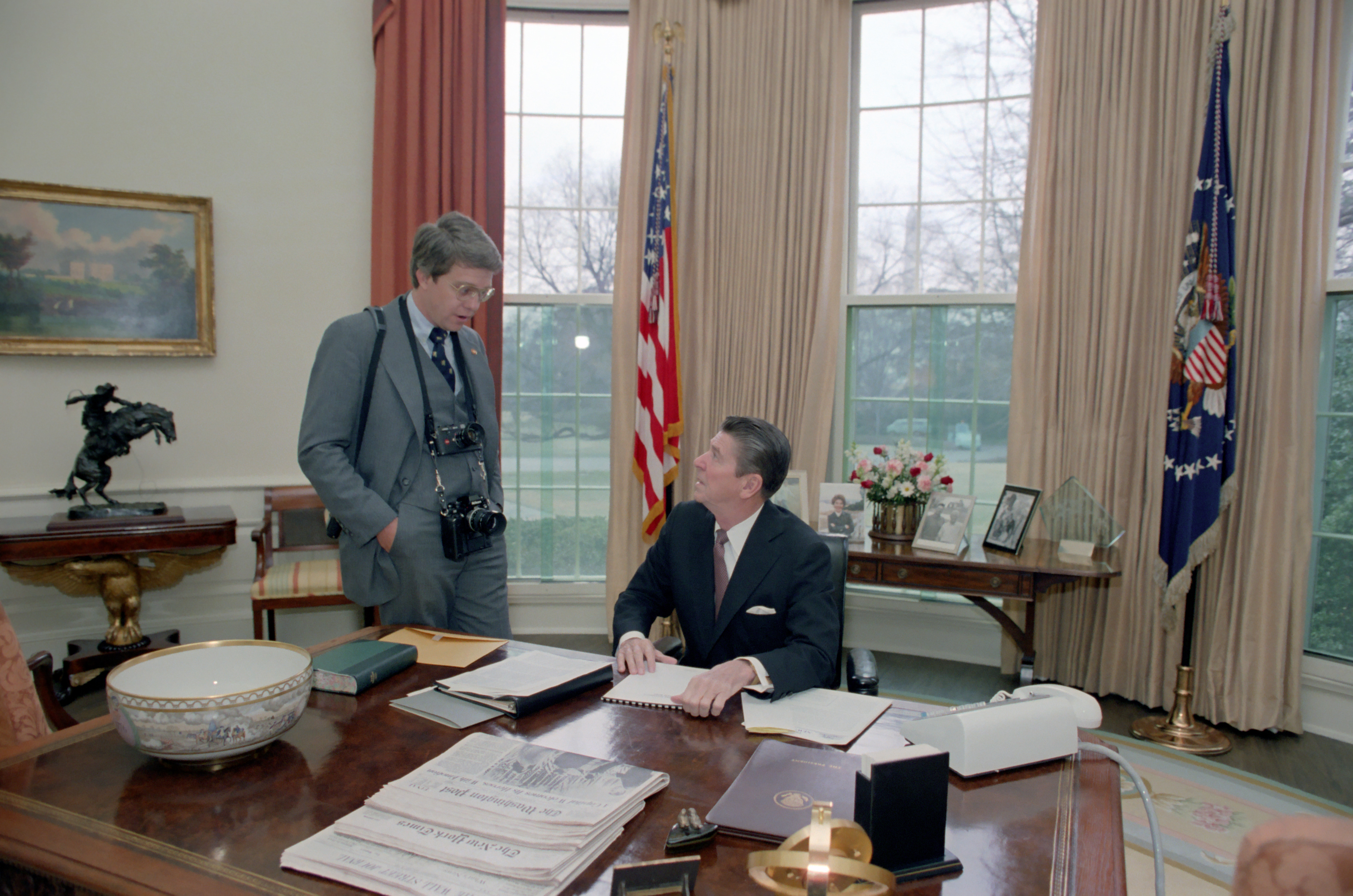
Evans meeting Reagan in the Oval Office, 1981

In 1982 he founded The Portrait Project, a nonprofit designed to photograph powerful people in Washington. Evans' portraits of 595 Washington personalities became a 1985 exhibit at the Corcoran Gallery of Art, and a 1986 book People and Power: Portraits from the Federal Village.

After he left his job at the White House, Evans returned to Time as a contract photographer for several years. Evans later became the photographer editor for the Atlanta Journal-Constitution, creating computer software for digital cataloguing systems.

Evans was a lifetime National Press Photographers Association Member and worked as the chief technical officer for ZUMA Press. Some notable photos by Evans include Nancy Reagan peering around the press room door with a birthday cake as a surprise for her husband, as well as images of the Reagan assassination attempt by John Hinckley Jr.

Michael Evans married Linda Forde in 1967; they had three children and divorced in 1975. He later married Story Shem in 1983, a former Carter administration aide and founding partner of Arrive, a Washington communications firm. They had two children. He had one additional child prior to both of his marriages.

Evans died of cancer at his home in Atlanta, Georgia.
