= Liberty (dog) =

Golden Retriever owned by Gerald Ford and family

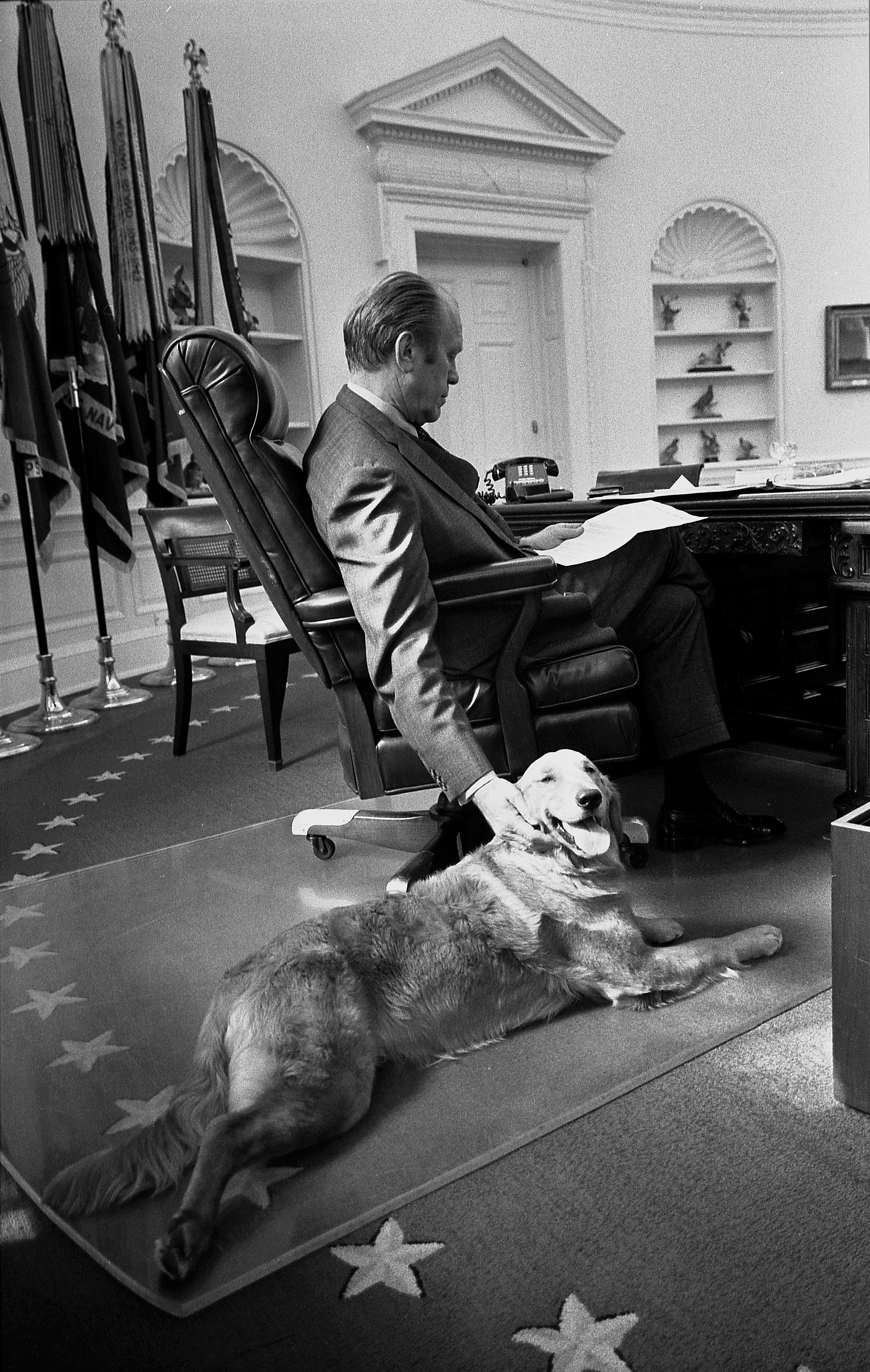
- President Gerald Ford and Liberty in the Oval Office in 1974
- Species: Canis familiaris
- Breed: Golden Retriever
- Sex: Female
- Born: Honor's Foxfire Liberty Hume; February 8, 1974; California
- Died: 1984 (aged 9–10)
- Owner: The Ford Family

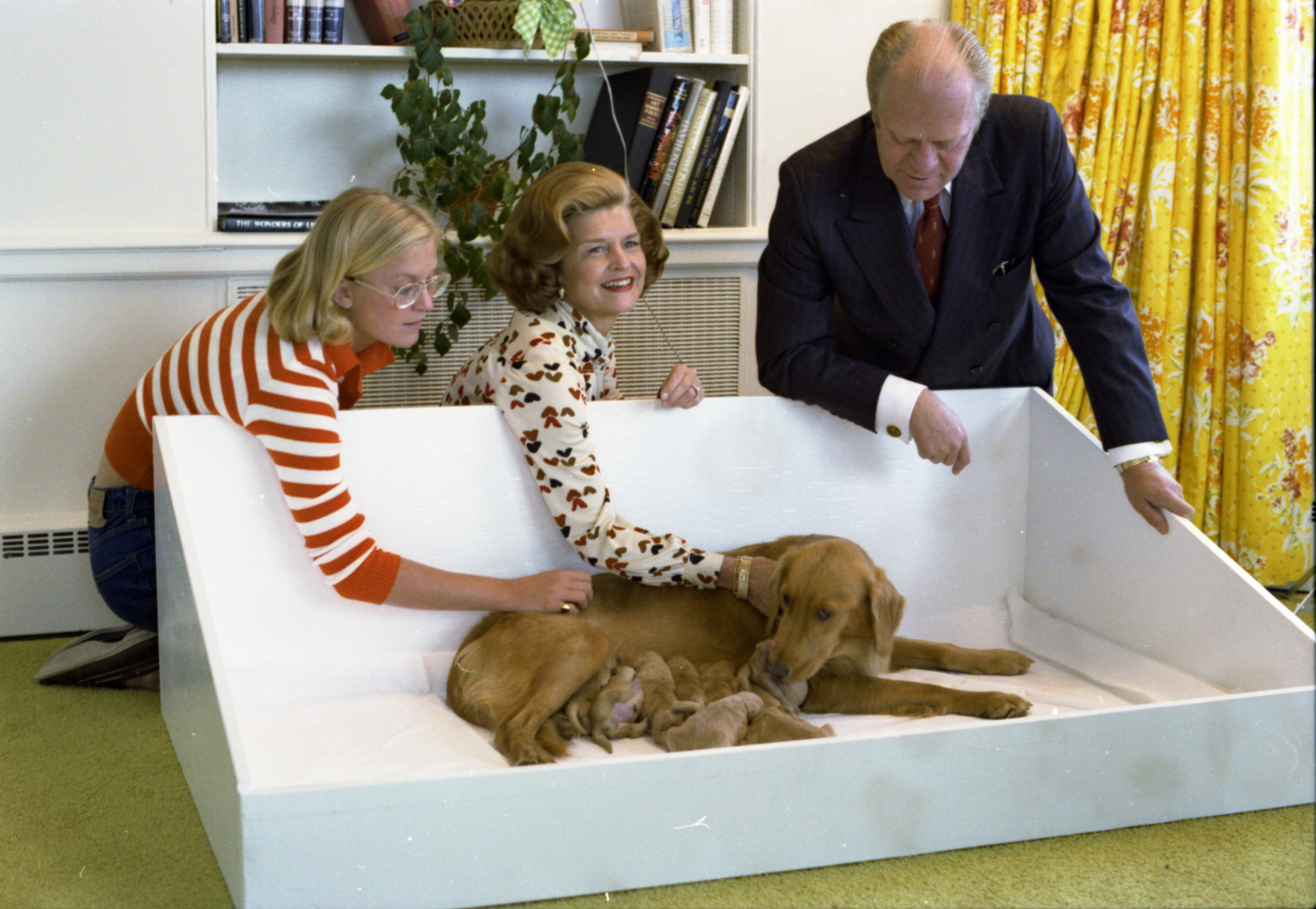
Susan, Betty and President Gerald Ford with Liberty and her puppies at the White House in 1975

Honor's Foxfire Liberty Hume (February 8, 1974 – 1984) (AKC Registration Number SB578950) was the Golden Retriever presidential pet of Betty Ford and Gerald Ford. Liberty was born February 8, 1974, and given to the president as an 8-month-old puppy by his daughter Susan Ford and new White House photographer David Hume Kennerly in the fall of 1974. The breeder of the dark gold pup was Ann (Avis) Friberg of Mount Vernon, Washington.

Friberg was not informed that the dog was to go to the White House. She is said to have asked whether it would go to a nice family, have a nice home, and whether the father had a steady job. In recounting the story to Tawny Little, Miss America 1976, Ford remarked "two out of three's not bad."

Liberty was frequently photographed with Ford in the Oval Office, in the swimming pool at Camp David and on the South Lawn of the White House. She also had a litter of pups in the White House on September 14, 1975, one of which – Misty – was kept by Ford. At one point Ford was locked in a White House stairwell after returning from walking the dog on the South Lawn early one morning. Photographs of the dog were autographed with a rubber stamp of her paw print. Stories indicated that if Ford wanted to end a conversation in the Oval Office, he would signal Liberty, who would then approach the guest while wagging her tail, creating a natural break.

Ford discussed the dog in a speech on October 9, 1974, in a tribute to William Scranton in Philadelphia, Pennsylvania:

This puppy has really taken over the White House. In fact, you may have seen some of us laughing up here during dinner. As I reached in my pocket to get a match to light my pipe, look what I pulled out of the pocket — some dog biscuits! [Laughter]

Let me tell you the story about Susan and Dave and how they bought this dog. I first should preface that the Fords had had two previous golden retrievers. One lived 13 years and died, and then another one died a year ago in August after 9 years. So we are fairly partial, I would say, to golden retrievers.

Well, Dave and Susan called up a very highly recommended individual who had contacts with the people who raise golden retrievers all over the country. And Dave, as I understand it — who is communicating with the breeder who happened to have a golden retriever about this age — Dave asked the individual if they had a dog and was it available, and the owner said that they had this 8-month-old golden retriever, but breeder was a little cautious — they're very possessive about these dogs — and he asked in a very nice way who the dog's owner would be.

And they said, Dave and Susan, that they had to keep it a secret. Well, the kennel owner said that they don't sell dogs that way. He would have to know who the dog's owner would be, and he wanted to know would the dog have a good home.

So, Dave and Susan very specifically assured the dog owner that it would have a good home. They explained that the parents were friendly and middle-aged and they had four children. The kennel owner said, "That sounds fine. What kind of a house do they live in?"

Susan and Dave said, "Well, it is a big white house with a fence around it." The kennel owner said, "This is a big dog. Will it have enough to eat? Does the father have a steady job?" Well, on that question, they were stuck a bit. [Laughter]

Needless to say they got the dog and, in the appropriate spirit of the city of Philadelphia, we have named her "Liberty." One of those inquisitive reporters that we have in Washington asked Susan who is going to take care of Liberty; who is going to feed her and groom her and take her out each night or every morning? And Susan did not hesitate one minute. She said, "Of course, it will be Dad." So, I have this feeling — this is one Liberty that is going to cost me some of mine. [Laughter]

But in a very broader sense, that is the true nature of liberty. It comes with both privileges and obligations. Freedom, we all know, is seldom free.

Liberty is immortalized in bronze as part of Ford's statue in Rapid City, South Dakota's "City of Presidents" public art installation of presidential statues.

== See also ==
- List of individual dogs

Honorary titles
Preceded by King Timahoe (Richard Nixon's; Irish Setter)	White House pet dog August 9, 1974 – January 20, 1977	Succeeded by Grits (Jimmy Carter's; Border Collie)
