= Barbara Kinney =

American photographer

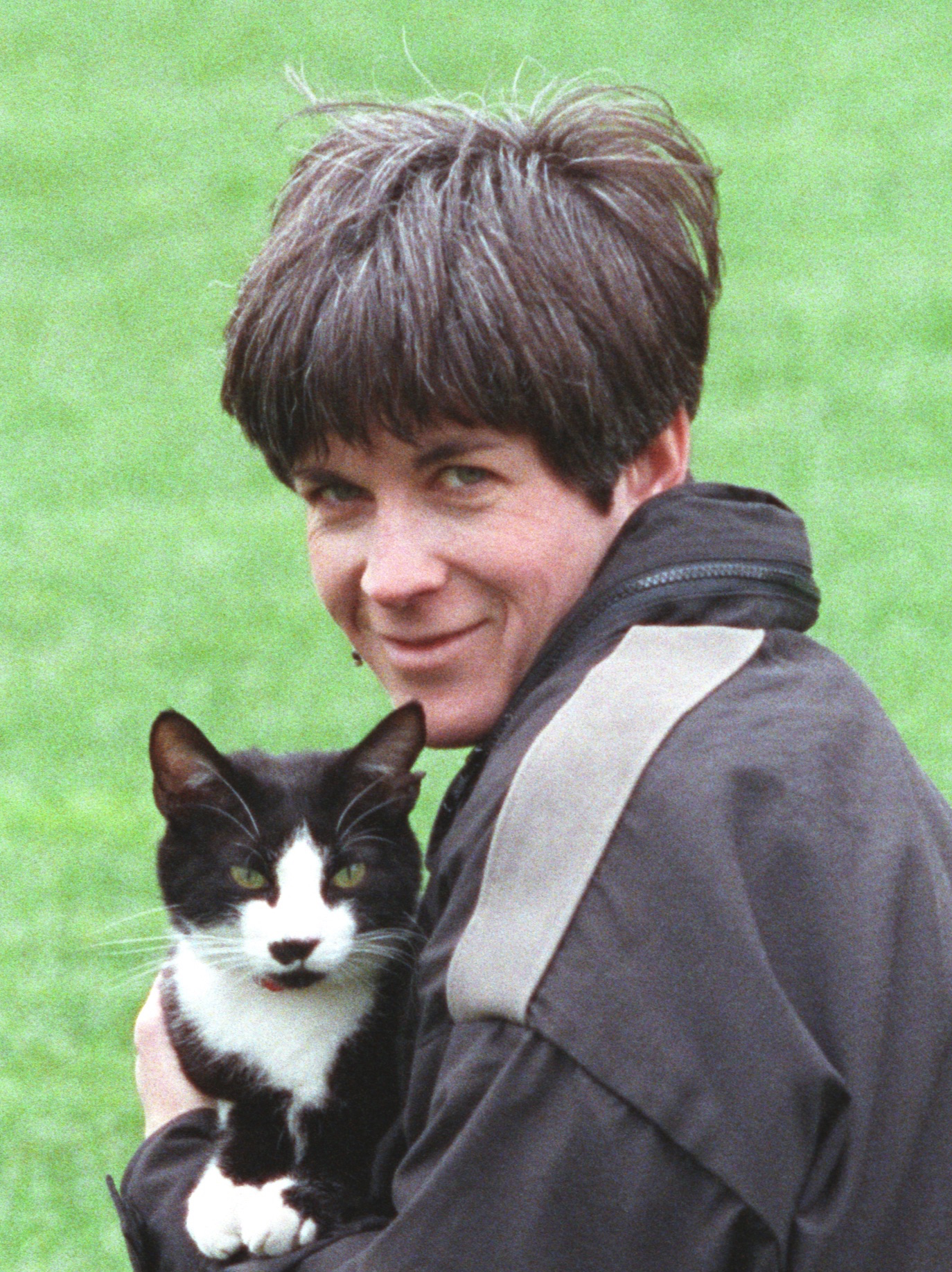
Barbara Kinney with Socks at the White House in 1993

Barbara Kinney is an American photojournalist based in Seattle, Washington. Born in Evansville, Indiana, she is a graduate of the Allen White School of Journalism at the University of Kansas. Her career began in 1982. She was US President Bill Clinton's personal photographer for six years of his tenure. Her photographs have won the first place award from the World Press Photo Foundation and appeared in Time, Newsweek, Life and American Photo magazines, among others.

Before her White House years, Kinney was a picture editor and photographer for USA Today during the paper's first six years and a freelance photographer in Washington from 1989 to 1992.

Kinney left the White House in 1999 and became Reuters' global entertainment editor and taught photography at the American University and Gallaudet University. She was a mentor on America Photo treks to India, Ireland and Israel.

Kinney served as the official photographer for Hillary Clinton's 2016 presidential bid.
