= The Thing About Pam =

2022 American crime drama television series

- Title card
- Genre: Black comedy; Drama; True crime
- Based on: The Thing About Pam Podcast and Dateline TV Episodes Concerning the Story of Pam Hupp
- Starring: Renée Zellweger; Josh Duhamel; Judy Greer; Gideon Adlon; Sean Bridgers; Suanne Spoke; Mac Brandt; Katy Mixon; Glenn Fleshler
- Narrated by: Keith Morrison
- Composers: Giona Ostinelli; Sonya Belousova
- Country of origin: United States
- Original language: English
- No. of episodes: 6

Production
- Executive producers: Noah Oppenheim; Liz Cole; Chris McCumber; Jeremy Gold; Jessika Borsiczky; Scott Winant; Mary Margaret Kunze; Renée Zellweger; Carmella Casinelli; Jason Blum; Jenny Klein; Mary Lisio
- Producers: Matt K. Turner; Blaine Williams; Alissa M. Kantrow
- Cinematography: John Brawley
- Editors: Avril Beukes; Cecily Rhett; Aric Lewis; Kevin D. Ross
- Running time: 43 minutes
- Production companies: Weird Egg Productions; Big Picture Co.; NBC News Studios; Blumhouse Productions

Original release
- Network: NBC
- Release: March 8 – April 12, 2022

The Thing About Pam is an American true crime comedy drama miniseries about Pam Hupp's part in her friend Betsy Faria's murder. It stars Renée Zellweger, Josh Duhamel, Judy Greer, Gideon Adlon, Sean Bridgers, Suanne Spoke, Mac Brandt, Katy Mixon, and Glenn Fleshler. Jenny Klein serves as showrunner for the series.

After Peacock Productions was shut down, NBC News Studios was launched with the intention of creating documentary-style content. The series was announced in May 2020 when the company revealed a partnership with Blumhouse Television. It is based on coverage from Dateline NBC and is titled after a Dateline podcast of the same name. In February 2021, the series was given a six-episode order with Zellweger joining the cast and the production as an executive producer. Filming took place in New Orleans.

The Thing About Pam premiered on NBC on March 8, 2022. It received mixed reviews from critics. Though some praised Zellweger's performance as Hupp in her network television debut, others criticized the comedic tone used to convey the story of a real murder. A spin-off, The Thing About Tommy, is in development.

== Premise ==
The Thing About Pam details the murder of Betsy Faria, a cancer-stricken woman found dead in her home in Troy, Missouri, in December 2011. Betsy's friend, house-flipper Pam Hupp, told the police she was the last person to see her on the night of her death after insisting on driving her home. The police suspected Betsy's husband, Russ, as the culprit and arrested him, but when his conviction was overturned, holes appeared in Pam's testimony, revealing a diabolical scheme. Meanwhile, television producers sought to devote several episodes from Dateline NBC to Betsy's story, which uncovers Pam's past and makes her a suspect in the case.

== Cast ==
=== Main ===
- Renée Zellweger as Pam Hupp, a self-appointed "businesswoman" arrested for the murder of Betsy Faria.
- Josh Duhamel as Joel Schwartz, the defense attorney for Russ Faria.
- Judy Greer as Leah Askey, the Lincoln County prosecutor who tried Russ Faria twice for his wife's murder.
- Gideon Adlon as Mariah Day, Betsy and Russ's 17-year-old daughter.
- Sean Bridgers as Mark Hupp, Pam Hupp's husband.
- Suanne Spoke as Janet, Betsy's mother and Mariah's grandmother.
- Mac Brandt as Detective McCarrick, a detective assigned to Betsy's murder case.
- Katy Mixon as Betsy Faria, Russ's wife, Mariah Day's mother, and the murder victim.
- Glenn Fleshler as Russ Faria, Betsy's husband and Mariah's father.
- Olivia Luccardi as Lily Day, Betsy and Russ's daughter and Mariah's sister.

=== Guest ===
- Patricia French as Minnie, Pam's neighbor.
- Ben Chase as Nate Swanson, a defense attorney working with Joel.
- Drew Scheid as Travis Hupp, the son of Pam and Mark.
- Celia Weston as Shirley Neumann, Pam's mother.
- Heather Magee as Chris Mennemeyer, the judge in Russ's trial.
- Alice Barrett-Mitchell as Cathy Singer, a journalist and producer at Dateline.
- Dane Davenport as Mike Wood, a candidate for Lincoln County prosecutor and Joel's friend.
- Jeff Ryan Baker as Louis Gumpenberger, a Missouri resident who is shot and killed by Pam.

Dateline journalist Keith Morrison provides the show's narration.

== Episodes ==
| No. | Title | Directed by | Teleplay by | Original release date | U.S. viewers (millions) |
|---|---|---|---|---|---|
| 1 | "She's a Good Friend" | Scott Winant | Jessika Borsiczky and Jenny Klein | March 8, 2022 | 2.86 |
On December 27, 2011, in Troy, Missouri, Betsy Faria, a former co-worker of Hupp who has terminal cancer, is found murdered in her home. The police immediately suspect her husband, Russ. Her friend, house-flipper Pam Hupp, was the last person to see Betsy that night, after insisting on driving her home. She made several alibis by strategically calling her husband, Mark, and Betsy's mother, Janet, a few hours before Betsy was discovered. While Russ tells the police that Pam was good friends with Betsy, Pam awkwardly tries to make them suspicious of Russ. Pam's account of dropping off Betsy at her home includes several contradictions. Pam tells Janet that the police are holding Russ at the station.
| 2 | "She's a Helper" | Scott Winant | Jenny Klein | March 15, 2022 | 2.39 |
Russ is interrogated and released from the station after 24 hours. Pam and Mark talk to detectives. Pam mentions that Betsy had planned to reveal "something" Russ did to her. Lincoln County prosecutor Leah Askey deems this probable cause; the police arrest Russ, who hires Joel Schwartz and Nate Swanson as his lawyers. An investigation ensues. Joel and Nate deduce that Betsy was strangled and then stabbed postmortem. Leah and Joel discover that, days before she died, Betsy changed the sole beneficiary of her $150,000 life insurance policy from Russ to Pam; Leah perceives this as Russ's motive to kill, while Joel sees it as Pam's. Pam agrees to testify in court. Joel learns that the trial judge, Chris Mennemeyer, went to high school with Leah. Detective McCarrick encourages Pam to put the insurance money in a trust for Faria's daughters, which, eventually, she does.
| 3 | "She's a Star Witness" | Logan Kibens | Kirk A. Moore | March 22, 2022 | 2.48 |
Producer Cathy Singer decides to devote several episodes of Dateline NBC to a story about Betsy. Leah files several motions to preclude any evidence regarding Pam during the trial. Despite Joel's objections, Chris Mennemeyer, the judge, grants the motions. Mariah testifies in court and describes quarrels between Russ and Betsy. Leah's tactics make it difficult for Joel to defend Russ. The prosecution calls Pam to the stand. Joel points out the contradictions in Pam's story. He also motions an offer of proof to show Mennemeyer the insurance policy records. Mennemeyer, however, denies the defense any attempt to question Pam about her story. Pam fakes a limp as she exits the courtroom. Mariah and her sister threaten to sue Pam if they do not receive the insurance money. After three days in court, Leah and Joel make their closing statements. While Leah tries to attack Russ's character, Joel talks only about existing evidence. The jury finds Russ found guilty of murder in the first degree, and he is given a life sentence without parole. Pam transfers the money in Mariah's trust to her personal checking account.
| 4 | "She's a Loving Daughter" | Logan Kibens | Matt K. Turner | March 29, 2022 | 2.50 |
Pam has a strained relationship with her mother. Shirley threatens to take her out of her will every time Pam makes a misstep, which infuriates her because she struggles with finances. After he spends three years in prison, there is an appeal to Russ's conviction. Dateline producers seek out Pam. Russ has his conviction overturned after Joel presents irrefutable evidence proving Russ's innocence. Pam's daughter and her husband attempt to get into the house flipping business but lose a house at an auction when Pam outbids them. Joel appears on Dateline. Desperate for more money, Pam visits her mother. When Shirley threatens to exclude her from her will for an additional time, Pam mixes something in her drink. Later, Shirley's dead body is found outside, apparently after sustaining a fall from her balcony.
| 5 | "She's Not Who You Think She Is" | Adam Kane | Adam Lash & Cori Uchida | April 5, 2022 | 3.08 |
In 2003, Pam and Mark move from Florida to Missouri due to Pam's possible involvement in money laundering. In the present, Pam overhears a store clerk who believes she killed Betsy. Joel helps Mike Wood run against Leah for the position of Lincoln County prosecutor. As a result of Pam's infamy, Mark contemplates moving out of town with her and their son Travis. Pam criticizes Mark. Dateline dedicates several episodes to Pam's involvement in Betsy and Shirley's deaths. Mariah and her sister sue Pam because of the insurance money. Pam ends up winning the case. Pam, pretending to be Russ, writes Mariah a mean letter. As the Dateline episodes and Mike's campaign shine a light on Pam, the people of Troy, including her next-door neighbor Minnie, turn against her. Mariah moves out of town. Pam poisons Minnie with a cough drop.
| 6 | "She's a Killer" | Adam Kane | Jenny Klein & Travis Sentell | April 12, 2022 | 2.92 |
Pam picks up Louis Gumpenberger, a stranger with mental and physical disabilities. She gives him $1,000 to record "soundbites" at her house. She calls 9-1-1 and makes Louis blurt out a confession to Betsy's murder. Pam shoots and kills him with her gun, claiming self-defense over the phone, and plants false evidence in his pocket. As a result, Russ, who is in Florida, is forced to return to Troy, Missouri, to speak to the police. Pam is arrested for the murder. In the police station, Pam goes to the bathroom and uses a ballpoint pen to stab her neck in a suicide attempt. Pam pleads guilty and is sentenced to life in prison. An epilogue says Mark divorced Pam; Mariah returned to Missouri and had two children; Russ became engaged but has still not talked to his daughters; Mike won his election against Leah and reopened Betsy's murder case in 2019; Leah was investigated for prosecutorial misconduct; Joel and Nate are still occasionally working together; Shirley's death is under investigation; Louis's family did not see a trial for his murder; and the police brought new charges against Pam in 2021. In prison, Pam watches the show and declares that they "got it all wrong."

== Production ==
=== Development ===
On January 10, 2020, NBC announced its plans to shut down the unscripted production unit Peacock Productions. Variety reported that the decision was sparked by the rise of streaming services and a necessity for "higher-quality productions". In a statement, NBC said the company was "shifting its documentary strategy to an entirely new model" that would be "consistent with industry trends". Two weeks later, on January 23, NBC News Studios was launched. Liz Cole, executive producer of Dateline NBC and the then-president of Peacock Productions, announced she would also serve as president of the new company. The studio's intent is to produce content for emerging platforms, documentaries, docu-series, and select scripted programming. At the time of its announcement, NBC News Studios had already attained partnerships with Blumhouse Television and Focus Features, with the former revealing they were in negotiations to develop and produce scripted programs based on stories told on Dateline. In a statement, Cole said "the documentary business is certainly more robust than it ever has been. More and more people are seeking out that content".

On May 19, 2020, it was reported that NBC News Studios and Blumhouse Television were developing an untitled scripted television series based on coverage from Dateline about the involvement of Pam Hupp in the murder of Betsy Faria as well as the sentencing and release of her husband, Russ Faria. Since 2014, Dateline has assigned multiple episodes to the story and created a podcast centered around the case in 2019 titled The Thing About Pam. In a statement, Cole said that "having been at the forefront of the true-crime genre for so long, we know better than anyone that truth is often stranger than fiction, and with the twists and turns in this case, we saw a real opportunity to present it in a scripted format". In addition to the series announcement, it was revealed Cole would executive produce alongside Jason Blum, Marci Wiseman, and Jeremy Gold.

=== Casting ===
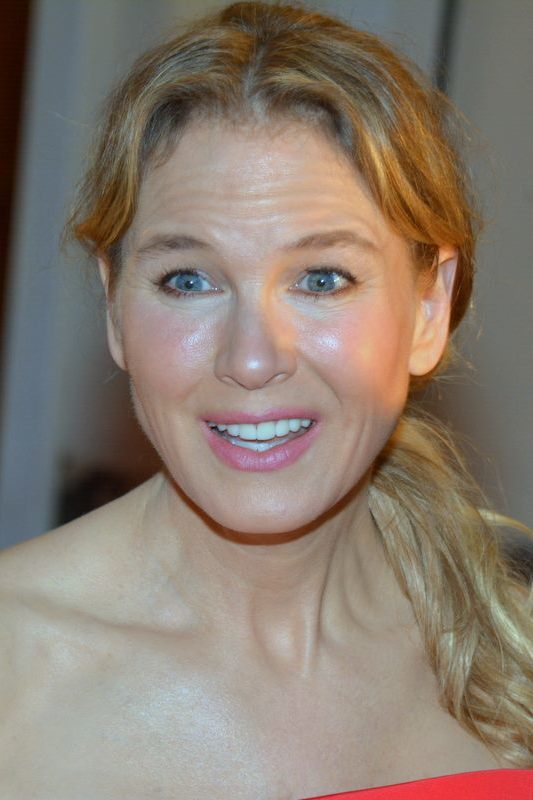
Renée Zellweger (pictured in 2016) plays Pam Hupp in her network television debut.

The limited series was given a six-episode order and titled The Thing About Pam on February 4, 2021, with Renée Zellweger joining the cast to portray Hupp in her network television debut and attaching herself as an executive producer through her production company Big Picture Co. It was also reported that NBCUniversal Chairman of Entertainment Content Susan Rosner Rovner would oversee the series and that Jessika Borsiczky would write and serve as showrunner. In a statement, Borsiczky said the murder case she was adapting could be interpreted as both a whodunit and a character study. Additional executive producers included Carmella Casinelli, Borsiczky, Noah Oppenheim, and Chris McCumber. In May 2021, Jenny Klein signed a one-year first-look deal with Blumhouse Television and joined The Thing About Pam as a writer and executive producer.

Marci Wiseman, following her resignation as Co-President of Blumhouse Television in October 2020, was later removed as an executive producer for the series. In June 2021, Josh Duhamel was added to the cast with Mary Margaret Kunze joining as an executive producer. By August 2021, The Thing About Pam was in the final stages of pre-production with casting still underway in New Orleans. On August 24, it was announced Borsiczky had exited the series as writer and showrunner due to creative differences but that she would remain an executive producer for the time being; Klein was appointed as the new showrunner. On August 27, it was reported that pre-production would be suspended for some time due to Hurricane Ida with a filming start date set for early September. On August 30, Judy Greer and Katy Mixon joined the cast. On September 24, Gideon Adlon, Sean Bridgers, Glenn Fleshler, Suanne Spoke, and Mac Brandt were added to the cast.

=== Filming ===
On September 28, 2021, Scott Winant was announced to be directing the first two episodes as well as executive producing. Filming was postponed until October 1, 2021. At the second annual BlumFest in October, Zellweger spoke with Dateline correspondent Keith Morrison about portraying Hupp, "Truth is stranger than fiction. She's notorious, not famous. It won't be the same as coming to understanding a person's life experiences within context. [I am] going to be researching and trying to understand just based on the limited information that's available. I'm going to play the person that you sort of illuminated in your podcast and try to understand what makes a person like that tick". Throughout October, Zellweger was photographed wearing face and body prosthetics to portray Hupp. Filming took place in New Orleans and Hammond, Louisiana.

Makeup artist Arjen Tuiten said it took eighty minutes to apply prosthetics on Zellweger. "It was Arjen who did all of the work. Arjen and Benadryl. I'm allergic to adhesives, and so there was a lot of comedy in the preparation," the actress remarked. After adding the prosthetics, the makeup took between two and four hours to apply. Hair department head Lawrence Davis and makeup department head Carla Brenholtz said they added light touches to prosecutor Leah Askey (played by Greer), based on a look anchored in Troy, Missouri. Zellweger described her physical transformation as "pretty much head to toe". When asked why they did not cast an actress with a closer resemblance to Hupp's physical appearance, McCumber replied, "When a two-time Oscar winner calls and says, 'I'm obsessed with this story and I want to play Pam and I want to produce, you say, 'Yes, yes, yes, yes.' And our job at that point is to provide Renee and the rest of the cast with all the tools they need to embody these characters."

=== Music ===
The score was composed by Giona Ostinelli and Sonya Belousova. The theme implemented the use of an English horn, a prepared piano with coins between the strings, a harmonica, "ka-ching" sounds, a custom-made Italian instrument combining a waterphone and daxophone, and the sound of someone slurping. The slurping effect, which the duo came up with before filming began, was also used in the sound design.

== Release ==
First-look images and a trailer were released in early February. Initial responses to the promotional material were negative; Libby Hall from IndieWire called Zellweger's use of prosthetics and a padded suit an example of fatphobia. The series held a premiere in Los Angeles on February 28, 2022, and premiered on NBC on March 8.

== Reception ==
=== Critical response ===
On the review aggregator website Rotten Tomatoes, 44% of 27 critics' reviews are positive, with an average rating of 5.8/10. The website's consensus reads: "Renée Zellweger is visibly having fun, but The Thing About Pam's glossy take on a true crime is neither as entertaining or insightful as it aims to be." Metacritic, which uses a weighted average, assigned a score of 55 out of 100 based on 18 critics, indicating "mixed or average reviews".

Zellweger's performance divided critics. Kimberly Potts of TheWrap said it appeared Zellweger was "thoroughly enjoying her time" as Hupp. John Doyle of The Globe and Mail said the actress "brings an equal amount of vinegary exuberance to the work." IndieWire's Ben Travers, on the other hand, called her performance "exaggerated". From Vulture, Roxana Hadadi said "Zellweger is simultaneously broadly cartoonish and blandly nonspecific. She squints so much that her eyes lose whatever interiority they might have reflected; there is no real difference between her smile or her frown." Variety's Daniel D'Addario criticized the "uncanny" prosthetics and the appearance of a Dateline producer as a character, writing, "It'd be a shame if Zellweger's first acting gig after her Oscar-boosted return to Hollywood were, ultimately, little more than NBC cross-promotion."

The show's comedic tone was criticized. Brian Lowry at CNN called it a failed attempt to be "the next Fargo". Liam Mathews at TVGuide said the "deliciously satisfying" tone was similar to that of the Coen brothers, but that its use to convey the story of a real murder would make "you feel [a] little queasy." Ciara Wardlow, writing for RogerEbert.com, categorized it as "a watchable if often underwhelming true crime docudrama that wants to both be weird and play it safe, ending up in a strange middle ground between the two." In a more positive review, The A.V. Club's Gwen Ihnat said "The Thing About Pam does an impressive job of translating an addictive tale to the small screen."

=== Ratings ===
The premiere episode increased its viewership by 205% after seven days, from 2.9 million viewers when it aired to 8.7 million viewers after a week with delayed viewing across linear and DVR, as well as Hulu, NBC.com, the NBC app, and Peacock. By the end of its run on April 12, 2022, The Thing About Pam had become NBC's highest-rated freshman series of the 2021–2022 television season. It also had a positive impact on Dateline, especially on the viewership of the episodes about Hupp that inspired the series.

Viewership and ratings per episode of The Thing About Pam
| No. | Title | Air date | Rating (18–49) | Viewers (millions) | DVR (18–49) | DVR viewers (millions) | Total (18–49) | Total viewers (millions) | Ref. |
|---|---|---|---|---|---|---|---|---|---|
| 1 | "She's a Good Friend" | March 8, 2022 | 0.40 | 2.86 | 0.18 | 1.67 | 0.58 | 4.54 | |
| 2 | "She's a Helper" | March 15, 2022 | 0.31 | 2.39 | 0.15 | 1.59 | 0.46 | 3.98 | |
| 3 | "She's a Star Witness" | March 22, 2022 | 0.35 | 2.48 | 0.20 | 1.72 | 0.54 | 4.20 | |
| 4 | "She's a Loving Daughter" | March 29, 2022 | 0.31 | 2.50 | 0.24 | 1.95 | 0.55 | 4.44 | |
| 5 | "She's Not Who You Think She Is" | April 5, 2022 | 0.35 | 3.08 | 0.21 | 1.78 | 0.57 | 4.86 | |
| 6 | "She's a Killer" | April 12, 2022 | 0.34 | 2.92 | 0.22 | 1.85 | 0.56 | 4.77 | |

=== Accolades ===
The series was one of 94 out of the 200 most-popular scripted television series that received the ReFrame Stamp for the years 2021 to 2022. The stamp is awarded by the gender equity coalition ReFrame and industry database IMDbPro for film and television projects that are proven to have gender-balanced hiring, with stamps being awarded to projects that hire female-identifying people, especially women of color, in four out of eight key roles for their production.

Accolades received by The Thing About Pam
| Award | Date of ceremony | Category | Recipient(s) | Result | Ref. |
|---|---|---|---|---|---|
| Hollywood Critics Association TV Awards | August 14, 2022 | Best Writing in a Broadcast Network or Cable Limited Series, Anthology Series, or Movie | Jenny Klein & Travis Sentell | Nominated | |
| Hollywood Critics Association TV Awards | August 14, 2022 | Best Supporting Actress in a Broadcast Network or Cable Limited Series, Anthology Series, or Movie | Judy Greer | Nominated | |
| Hollywood Critics Association TV Awards | August 14, 2022 | Best Supporting Actor in a Broadcast Network or Cable Limited Series, Anthology Series, or Movie | Josh Duhamel | Nominated | |
| Hollywood Critics Association TV Awards | August 14, 2022 | Best Actress in a Broadcast Network or Cable Limited Series, Anthology Series, or TV Movie | Renée Zellweger | Nominated | |
| People's Choice Awards | December 6, 2022 | Bingeworthy Show of 2022 | The Thing About Pam | Nominated | |
| Satellite Awards | March 3, 2023 | Best Actress in a Miniseries, Limited Series, or Motion Picture Made for Television | Renée Zellweger | Nominated | |

== Spin-off ==
A spin-off, The Thing About Tommy, is in development at Peacock. It will depict a different criminal: Thomas Randolph.
