= Pam Hupp =

American murderer (born 1958)

- Hupp's booking photograph at the Chillicothe Correctional Center, taken in 2019.
- Born: Pamela Marie Neumann; October 10, 1958 (age 68)
- Occupation: Life insurance administrator (formerly)
- Spouse: Mark Hupp (divorced)
- Children: 2
- Status: Incarcerated
- Criminal charges: First-degree murder; Armed criminal action
- Penalty: Life in prison without parole

Details
- Victims: Louis Gumpenberger
- Date: August 16, 2016
- Locations: O'Fallon, Missouri, U.S.
- Weapon: Ruger LCR
- Date apprehended: August 23, 2016
- Imprisoned at: Chillicothe Correctional Center

Pamela Marie Hupp (née Neumann; born October 10, 1958) is an American convicted murderer serving a life sentence in Missouri's Chillicothe Correctional Center for the fatal shooting of Louis Gumpenberger in her home in O'Fallon, Missouri. In August 2016, Hupp staged the killing of Gumpenberger (a disabled man) by luring him into her house and shooting him. Hupp's claim that she had killed Gumpenberger in self-defense was not accepted by law enforcement and she ultimately entered an Alford plea before charges of first-degree murder and armed criminal action could go to trial.

Testimony from Hupp had played a key role in the 2013 conviction of Russ Faria for the murder of his wife, Betsy, who was stabbed to death in her home in Troy, Missouri, in 2011. After a successful appeal and second trial in 2015, Russ was exonerated after his defense was permitted to introduce evidence that had been withheld from the original trial jury, some of which implicated Hupp – the beneficiary of a life insurance policy held by Betsy – as the killer. Law enforcement have theorized that Hupp tricked Gumpenberger into entering her home and then murdered him in a failed attempt to frame Russ. In July 2021, Hupp was charged with the first-degree murder of Betsy Faria, with a trial expected to be held in 2028.

Hupp has also been investigated in connection with the death of her mother, Shirley Neumann, who died in 2013 from injuries sustained in a fall from the balcony of her third-floor apartment in Fenton, Missouri. A tip-off to police accused Hupp of killing Neumann for financial gain. Neumann's death was initially ruled an accident, but in November 2017 the chief medical examiner for St. Louis County changed the cause of death to "undetermined", referencing the events in O'Fallon and Troy. An investigation into Neumann's death by the St. Louis County Police Department was inconclusive.

The killings of Betsy Faria and Louis Gumpenberger have been the subject of significant media coverage, including extensive reporting from the local Fox affiliate station KTVI in St. Louis and six Dateline NBC episodes airing from 2014 to 2022, as well as a Dateline NBC true crime podcast. A scripted television series featuring actress Renée Zellweger as Hupp, The Thing About Pam, aired on NBC in 2022.

== Prior life ==
Pamela Marie Neumann ("Pam") was born on October 10, 1958. She grew up in Dellwood, Missouri, a suburb of St. Louis, where she attended Riverview Gardens High School. In her young adulthood, Hupp held several jobs in the life insurance industry; on two occasions, she was fired for forging signatures. In 2001, Hupp and her husband settled in O'Fallon, Missouri, where she worked as an administrator for State Farm and flipped houses on the side via a company called H2 Partners LLC. By 2010, Hupp had stopped working and was claiming disability benefits for back, leg and neck pain.

In 2011, Hupp and Betsy Faria, who was terminally ill with cancer, reportedly collected money for a family also impacted by cancer. St. Louis station KTVI discovered several years later that the family did not know about the collection and "never saw a dime" of it; information was presented to Lincoln County authorities in 2014, but was not investigated further. There was no evidence to suggest Betsy knew that the fundraiser (Hupp), who went door to door to collect donations, was unreliable, with Betsy's friends recalling that she was excited to be helping a struggling family, even though she herself was dying. One of Betsy's friends, Kathleen Meyer, said, "This was going to be a legacy for her to leave something like this behind in her memory."

== Death of Betsy Faria ==
Elizabeth Kay Meyer Faria ("Betsy"; 1969-2011) was one of Hupp's coworkers at State Farm. She lived on Sumac Drive in Troy, Missouri, with her husband, Russell Scott Faria ("Russ"), and two daughters from a previous relationship. In 2010, Betsy was diagnosed with breast cancer. In October 2011 she learned the cancer had metastasized to her liver and was terminal.

On December 22, 2011, days before her death and unbeknownst to her family, Betsy changed the sole beneficiary of her $150,000 (equivalent to $215,000 in 2025) State Farm life insurance policy from her husband to Hupp, who originally said that Betsy had asked her to give the money to her daughters when they were older. Hupp later claimed that Betsy had wanted her to keep the money for herself. Betsy's daughters launched a legal challenge against Hupp and her husband to attempt to claim the life insurance policy in 2014, which was dismissed in 2016; Russ launched his own legal challenge against State Farm in 2016. Hupp admitted that she had lied about what she intended to do with the proceeds. Prosecutors later speculated that Russ had been angered by Betsy's actions, giving him a motive to kill her. Russ remained the beneficiary on a separate $100,000 (equivalent to $143,000 in 2025) policy.

Five days later, on December 27, Betsy underwent chemotherapy at the Alvin J. Siteman Cancer Center in St. Louis, then visited her mother's home. Afterward she was driven home by Hupp, the last confirmed person to have seen her alive. Betsy had originally been scheduled to be driven home by Russ, or else stay with her mother, until Hupp unexpectedly drove to her mother's house and insisted on driving Betsy home. Hupp claimed that she dropped Betsy off at her residence at approximately 7 p.m. At approximately 7:21 p.m., a call to Betsy from one of her daughters went unanswered.

Russ spent the evening at the home of his friend Michael Corbin, watching movies from 6 p.m. until 9 p.m., then drove to an Arby's in Lake St. Louis before returning home. At 9:40 p.m., Russ called 9-1-1, saying that he had discovered that his wife had killed herself. Betsy was found on the floor in front of her couch, laying on her right side. She had been stabbed over fifty-five times, with her wrists cut to the bone and a serrated kitchen knife left lodged in her neck. A second knife was found under a pillow on the couch she was lying on. First responders arrived within ten minutes and concluded that Betsy had been dead for at least an hour or longer. No blood evidence was found in any sink or shower. No blood trails were found exiting the home. Betsy's time of death was later reported as being between 7:20 p.m. and 9:41 p.m.

=== Conviction of Russ Faria ===
Russ was arrested the day after his wife's death. His initial assertion that Betsy had killed herself was considered "ludicrous" by first responders who saw her body. A police search of the house unearthed a bloodstained pair of slippers in his closet. Russ' agitated emotional state was regarded as "suspicious" by police, and he ostensibly failed a polygraph test. When interviewed by police, Hupp claimed that Russ had a "violent temper"; that he was a heavy drinker; and that he had threatened Betsy, who had considered leaving him. At Hupp's behest, police searched Betsy's laptop and found a document in which she purportedly expressed fears that her husband would kill her. It was later revealed that the document was written in Microsoft Word 97, software that had not been installed on the laptop; it was the only document on the laptop with an "unknown" author. On January 4, 2012, the day after Betsy's funeral, Russ was charged with first-degree murder and armed criminal action. Unable to make $250,000 bail (equivalent to $351,000 in 2025), he was held in Lincoln County jail until his trial began on November 18, 2013.

During Russ' trial, his defense attorney, Joel Schwartz, argued that the testimonies of the four friends he had visited, cellphone records evidencing his presence at Corbin's house twenty miles away from the murder scene and evidence of his making purchases from different stores over the course of the evening demonstrated that the timeline did not allow for him to commit the murder. There were no traces of blood on his body or clothes. Prosecuting attorney Leah Askey countered that Russ' friends were providing a false alibi and had conspired with him to perpetrate the murder – including holding onto his cellphone and posing as him to buy food at Arby's to falsify his whereabouts – as an "ultimate role play." The trial judge, Christina Mennemeyer, refused to allow Schwartz to present evidence implicating Hupp as an alternative suspect, including cellphone records showing she had been in the vicinity of the Faria house for up to thirty minutes after the time she claimed to have dropped Betsy off or that Betsy had made Hupp the sole beneficiary of her life insurance policy shortly before her death.

During the trial, Detective Mike Merkel of the Lincoln County Sheriff's Office reported that a crime scene camera had broken and photographs had failed to develop. (Schwartz later obtained copies of the photographs in question, and the detective was charged with perjury.) In a secret hearing during the trial, Hupp claimed that she had put $100,000 of the insurance money in a trust for Betsy's daughters; in a July 2014 civil deposition, she admitted she had not done so. (In August 2016, it was revealed that Hupp's company H2 Partners LLC had loaned $122,574.84 to her son Travis.)

On November 21, 2013, Russ was convicted on both counts. A month later, he was sentenced to life plus thirty years' imprisonment without possibility of parole and sent to the Jefferson City Correctional Center. Although a central premise of the prosecution's case was that his four friends had been complicit in the murder, no charges were ever brought against them; they were not aware they had been implicated by Askey in her closing arguments until the media informed them. The sentence was welcomed by Betsy's family; in an interview given following the sentencing, her sister Julie made claims unheard during the trial: that Russ had been angered by the removal of his name from a separate insurance policy, and that he had on one occasion held a pillow on Betsy's face and said "this is what it feels like to die." In response to the claims, Schwartz noted that the pillow story had originally been told by Hupp. Betsy's daughters ultimately issued an apology to Russ in July 2021.

=== Retrial and acquittal of Russ Faria ===
An initial motion for a new trial was rejected by Judge Mennemeyer in December 2013. In January 2014, KTVI partnered with the St. Louis Post-Dispatch newspaper to review the case. The next month, the Post-Dispatch reported that Hupp had kept the $150,000 rather than put it into a trust for Betsy's daughters. She had also contradicted herself during police interviews, such as initially claiming she had not entered the Faria house after driving Betsy home but later revising this account twice. The 9-1-1 operator who had taken Russ' call believed he had been genuinely shocked and upset. The article alleged that Askey had been in a relationship with Mike Lang, the captain of investigations for the Lincoln County Sheriff's Office and one of the investigating officers in the Faria murder case, as well as a prosecution witness. Two members of the jury in Russ' trial informed the media that this information had been withheld.

Meanwhile, Schwartz appealed Russ' conviction. In February 2015, the Missouri Court of Appeals sent the case back to the 45th Circuit Court for a hearing on a retrial. After Judge Mennemeyer recused herself from the case in June, 22nd Circuit Court Judge Steven Ohmer granted a motion for a new bench trial based on the evidence that had emerged, with Russ released on bond pending the trial. During the retrial, Schwartz was allowed to introduce evidence implicating Hupp as the perpetrator. CSI agent Amy Buettner, who had examined the crime scene, testified that she believed the slippers found in Russ's closet had not been bloodied by stepping in blood. On the stand, police officers disclosed that Hupp – who was not called to testify – had claimed in recent interviews that she and Betsy had been in a sexual relationship. Hupp also told police that she had "remembered" seeing Russ and another man in a car parked in a side street outside the Faria residence as she drove Betsy home. On November 7, 2015, Russ' conviction was overturned and he was released from prison after having served almost four years.

In 2016, Schwartz filed a bar complaint against Askey; it was eventually dismissed by the Office of the Chief Disciplinary Counsel. In July 2016, Russ filed a civil rights lawsuit against Askey and three Lincoln County deputy sheriffs on the grounds that they had "fabricated evidence, ignored exonerating evidence and failed to investigate the other obvious suspect." KTVI found other dubious cases involving Judge Mennemeyer. The following month, Askey and the sheriff's office issued a press release stating that they were cooperating with the United States Attorney for the Eastern District of Missouri in a review of the case. The following year, Askey asked Lincoln County commissioners to conduct an independent investigation into her conduct; the investigation found no wrongdoing.

In January 2017, Judge Mennemeyer was suspended by the Supreme Court of Missouri for misconduct unrelated to the Faria case. She had previously been overturned by higher courts on several occasions in her short career on the bench. In August 2018, both Mennemeyer and Askey (now Leah Wommack Chaney) were voted out of office, a result attributed, at least in part, to the mishandling of the Faria case. In September 2019, federal district judge John Andrew Ross dismissed Russ' suit against Chaney on the basis of prosecutorial immunity. In January 2018, attorneys acting for Russ deposed Hupp as part of his lawsuit against Lincoln County; she declined to answer ninety-two questions relating to the killing of Betsy. In response to the refusal, Russ' attorneys sought a court order to force a response. In March 2020, Russ received a settlement in his civil rights case of $2,050,000 (equivalent to $2,550,000 in 2025).

In June 2025, former sheriff's deputy Michael Merkel was charged with two counts of perjury for allegedly giving false testimony in Russ' trial. In January 2026, a hearing was held in which Merkel – represented by Chaney – was accused of falsely testifying that crime scene photos failed to develop.

The decision not to investigate Hupp had been widely criticized; a former employee of the prosecutor's office said, "There were several of us that kept thinking, why are we not pursuing Pam Hupp? [...] They were just locked down on Russ." In a 2021 interview, Chaney stated that she had believed Hupp would have been physically incapable of inflicting the wounds found on Betsy's body. In a July 2021 interview, Betsy's daughters stated that when they had asked about the possibility of Hupp having been the murderer, they were told by former Lincoln County investigators "she physically could not do that."

=== Charging of Pam Hupp ===
In June 2019, after Hupp entered an Alford plea to the murder of Louis Gumpenberger, Lincoln County prosecuting attorney Mike Wood announced that he would be reopening the Faria case. In October 2019, Wood requested a case review by the Major Case Squad of Greater St. Louis. In August 2020, newly elected Lincoln County Sheriff Rick Harrell said that the Faria case had inspired him to run for the job. In February 2021, Wood stated that the COVID-19 pandemic had slowed the investigation, but that he expected "significant announcements" in the summer or fall. On July 8, 2021, Hupp was interviewed in connection with Betsy's murder for the first time.

On July 12, 2021, Wood charged Hupp with the first-degree murder of Betsy Faria and with armed criminal action. Court documents filed by Wood asserted that Hupp murdered Betsy for financial gain. Wood stated that he would seek the death penalty for Hupp due to the "heinousness and depravity" of the crime. The prosecution alleged that Hupp repeatedly stabbed Betsy while she was asleep on her sofa and weakened from her chemotherapy treatment, then removed her socks and used them to spread blood around the house to try to give the impression of domestic violence before replacing them on Betsy's feet.

The court documents noted the following points:

- Hupp had been named the sole beneficiary on a $150,000 life insurance policy held by Betsy days before the murder; following her death, she did not give any of the money from the policy to Betsy's daughters despite her reported wishes.
- Hupp insisted upon driving Betsy home from her chemotherapy treatment despite Betsy already having transportation arranged and despite Hupp claiming not to be familiar with the Troy area.
- The position of Betsy's body suggested that she was murdered by someone she trusted.
- Hupp texted "home" to Betsy's phone at 7:20 p.m. yet cellphone records showed that Hupp's cellphone was still in the vicinity of Betsy's home at the time.

Wood also stated that he would be investigating potential prosecutorial misconduct in the original murder investigation, stating it had been "mismanaged from the beginning" and driven by confirmation bias against Russ. He suggested that the actions by investigators and prosecutors concerned could constitute gross negligence or "calculated criminal behavior." He further suggested that, by the time of Russ' second trial, Lincoln County prosecutors were acting to protect their own civil liability rather than seeking justice. Wood noted that a destruction order had been made in November 2015, the time of Russ' acquittal, but never actioned; had it been actioned, the order would have resulted in physical evidence connected with the case being destroyed. In response to Wood's announcement, Chaney gave an interview in which she denied any misconduct and stated she had never seen the destruction order. In May 2022, officers from the St. Charles Police Department suggested that "several" law enforcement personnel could face criminal charges.

In July 2021, Hupp entered a "not guilty" plea. On September 8, 2021, the armed criminal action charge against Hupp was dismissed. A preliminary hearing was scheduled for February 2022, but was delayed indefinitely after Hupp's public defender died of a heart attack; in August 2022, Hupp waived her right to a preliminary hearing. In October 2022, the venue of Hupp's trial was moved to Greene County to ensure a fair jury pool given the publicity around the case, being transferred to the 31st Judicial Circuit. In October 2023, the Lincoln County Prosecutor's Office announced that it would refile the case to petition for a venue closer to St. Louis for logistical reasons. The Prosecutor's Office also stated that it expected the trial to take place in summer 2025 and to last around one month. In February 2024, Wood filed a motion with the Lincoln County Circuit Court declaring the state's intention to pursue the death penalty due to "the statutory aggravating circumstance that the murder was outrageously or wantonly vile, horrible, or inhumane in that it involved depravity of the mind."

In March 2024, Hupp entered a "not guilty" plea to the refiled charges. At a hearing in September 2024, her public defender successfully requested that all DNA-related evidence held by prosecutors be provided to the defense. In January 2025, the trial was scheduled for August 3, 2026, in St. Charles. Wood stated that he would not accept an Alford plea. In March 2026, Hupp was transferred to Lincoln County jail in advance of the trial. At a hearing on March 29, 2026, Judge Christopher McDonough accepted a defense request to bring in an outside jury, which he suggested could delay the trial until 2028. During the hearing, Hupp's defense attorneys, Steven Lewis and Tony Davidson, stated they had commissioned Y-STR testing of items from the crime scene (including the handle of the murder weapon), which had found the presence of male DNA (that did not match Russ). McDonough sanctioned the prosecutor's office for delays in releasing DNA evidence to the defense.

In April 2026, after Mike Wood requested a new judge, Christopher McDonough vacated the August trial date and removed himself from the case, with the Supreme Court of Missouri assigning Joseph Rathert as the new judge. That same month, the prosecution agreed not to seek the death penalty for Hupp in return for Hupp waiving her right to a jury trial, with the trial date being pushed back to 2028. In September 2026, Hupp's lawyers filed a motion asking Rathert to bar prosecutors from presenting evidence about Hupp's murder of Louis Gumpenberger. In October 2026, Judge Rathert determined that the trial would take place in St. Louis County, with a planned start date of January 24, 2028.

== Death of Shirley Neumann ==
Shirley Mae Neumann, Hupp's widowed mother, was living alone in a third-floor apartment in the Lakeview Park Independent Senior Living Community in Fenton, suffering from dementia and arthritis. She spent the night of October 29, 2013, with Hupp following a hospital visit. At approximately 5 p.m. on October 30, Hupp dropped Neumann off at her apartment, instructing staff not to expect her for dinner that evening or breakfast the following day. A housekeeper found Neumann dead beneath the balcony of her home at 2:30 p.m. the next day. The aluminum balcony railing was broken. Following a police investigation, assistant medical examiner Raj Nanduri concluded that Neumann had died from blunt trauma to the chest resulting from an accidental fall. An autopsy found that Neumann had .84 mcg of the sedative Zolpidem in her blood, over eight times the expected concentration for someone having taken a normal dose.

The following month, the Lincoln County Sheriff's Office received an anonymous note suggesting Hupp, the last person known to have seen Neumann alive, had murdered her mother for her life insurance. Hupp and her siblings each received approximately $120,000 (equivalent to $166,000 in 2025) of investments held by Neumann, as well as sharing a $10,000 (equivalent to $14,000 in 2025) life insurance payout. Earlier that year, prior to her mother's death, Hupp had been videotaped saying, "My mom's worth half a million that I get when she dies [...] if I really wanted money, there was an easier way than trying to combat somebody that's physically stronger than me." Police reopened their investigation, but after interviewing the housekeeper who had found Neumann's body and Neumann's son Michael – both of whom said that Neumann was "unsteady" – again concluded that her death was accidental. They did not interview Hupp.

After Hupp was charged with the 2016 murder of Louis Gumpenberger, the St. Louis County Police Department reopened the investigation. Michael reiterated that he believed Neumann's death was accidental. Detective Matthew Levy attempted to get a subpoena for the location of Hupp's cellphone at the time of her mother's death but was unsuccessful. Levy also attempted to organize forensic tests on the balcony railing at the Missouri University of Science and Technology, but the Lakeview Park Independent Senior Living Community refused to provide the railing for testing. A retired homicide detective suggested to KTVI that one of the vertical bars appeared to have been "kicked out." After interviewing Hupp in connection with Neumann's death, KTVI reporter Chris Hayes received an anonymous letter stating, "Dear sirs: I think its [sic] getting a little silly that you keep accusing someone of killing their parent, when its [sic] not true."

In November 2017, Mary Case, the chief medical examiner for St. Louis County, changed the manner of Neumann's death from "accidental" to "undetermined." Case stated, "since [Neumann's] death, many things have happened that involved the daughter. And so all of that investigation, including the one in Lincoln County and the one in St. Charles, became pertinent information [...] I was no longer willing to say it could be an accident." The investigation into Neumann's death was not reopened.

== Murder of Louis Gumpenberger ==
=== Investigation ===
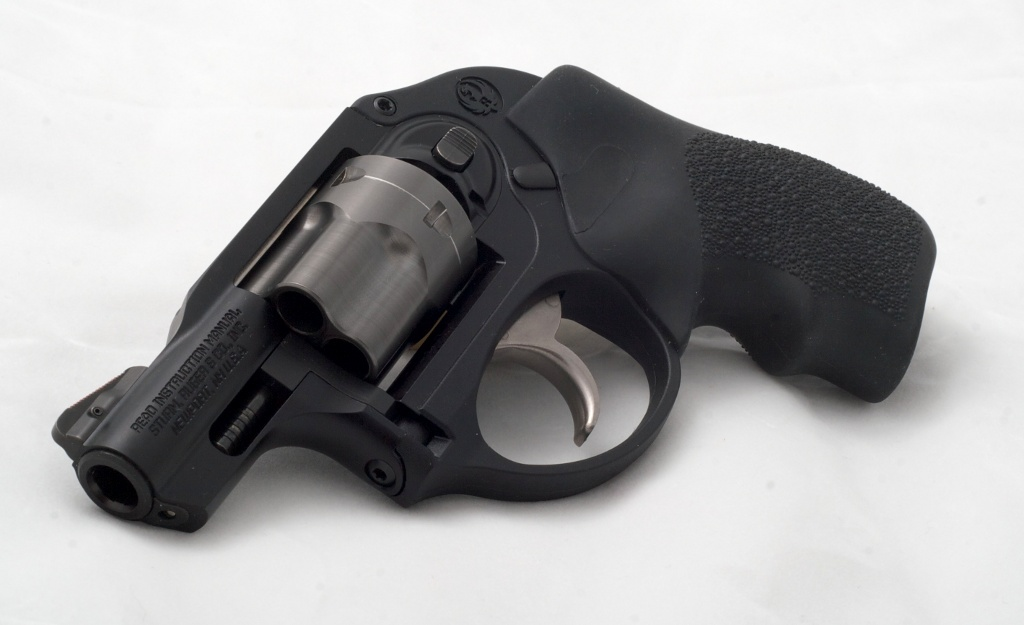
A Ruger LCR, the model of handgun used by Hupp to murder Gumpenberger.

Louis Royse Gumpenberger, aged 33, was a resident of Union, Missouri. He had mental and physical disabilities after a car crash in 2005. Shortly after noon on August 16, 2016, Gumpenberger died after Hupp shot him five times in the hallway of her home at 1260 Little Brave Drive in O'Fallon. $900 (equivalent to $1,207 in 2025) was found on Gumpenberger's body along with a note bearing instructions to "kidnap Hupp, get Russ's money from Hupp at her bank, and kill Hupp" and to, "Take Hupp back to house and get rid of her. Make it look like Russ' wife. Make sure knife sticking out of neck" in return for a reward of $10,000 (equivalent to $13,415 in 2025). As Hupp had placed two calls to 9-1-1 shortly before the shooting to report a burglary in progress, the audio of the incident was recorded.

Immediately after the shooting, Hupp voluntarily went to the O'Fallon Police Department. Her first words in the recorded interview were, "Is this going to be filmed? Because I always appear on the news with [KTVI reporter] Chris Hayes." She went on to say she blamed Hayes' reporting for attracting threatening people. Hupp claimed Gumpenberger had jumped out of a car which was driven by another person, brandished a knife while she sat in her SUV in her garage and demanded she drive to a bank to retrieve "Russ' money." Hupp further claimed she had knocked the knife out of Gumpenberger's hand with a "karate chop" and then fled into her house, shooting him in self-defense with a Ruger LCR she kept on her nightstand after he pursued her.

After investigating Hupp's claims, the St. Charles County prosecuting attorney and the O'Fallon chief of police theorized Hupp had lured Gumpenberger to her home by presenting herself as "Cathy," a producer for the television program Dateline NBC. Hupp then was believed to have offered Gumpenberger money to reenact a 9-1-1 call, then shot him in order to implicate Russ in an attempt on her life (and "take heat off her"), afterwards planting the knife, the note and the money on Gumpenberger's body. Gumpenberger was believed to have been selected at random. Several pieces of evidence were identified:

- Cellphone records showed Hupp had been in Gumpenberger's neighborhood "right at the supposed attacker’s front door" less than one hour before the shooting, casting doubt on her claim that she had never met him before.
- On August 10, 2016, a police report had been filed with the St. Charles County police, stating a woman matching Hupp's description had approached O'Fallon resident Carol Alford (sometimes referred to as Carol McAfee) while posing as a Dateline NBC producer and offering her $1,000 (equivalent to $1,342 in 2025) to reenact a 9-1-1 call. Home security camera footage showed the woman in question had been driving Hupp's car. A second witness, Brent Charlton, informed police that Hupp had approached him with a similar proposition.
- Investigators found nine one-hundred-dollar bills in Gumpenberger's pocket; a tenth found on Hupp's dresser had a sequential serial number to four of the nine bills.
- The knife found in Hupp's car was found wedged between the passenger seat and the central console. Knives in Hupp's kitchen were stored in a similar manner, wedged between the stove and countertop.
- Investigators suggested the knife had been purchased at the Dollar Tree in O'Fallon, alongside several other items found in Hupp's house. Hupp was believed to have purchased the paper on which the note found on Gumpenberger's body had been written.
- Investigators found that a carpet swatch in Hupp's home appeared to have been positioned to protect a rug from Gumpenberger's blood.
- Investigators were skeptical that Gumpenberger would have been capable of carrying out the acts described by Hupp, given his mental and physical disabilities.
- The recording of the 9-1-1 call made by Hupp (which began when the call was connected, rather than when the dispatcher began speaking) recorded silence, which contradicted Hupp's account of events ongoing as she placed the call.

=== Guilty plea ===
On August 23, 2016, Hupp was arrested and charged with first-degree murder and armed criminal action. Upon being arrested, she asked to visit a bathroom, where she used a ballpoint pen to stab her neck and wrists in an apparent suicide attempt; St. Charles County assistant prosecutor Phil Groenweghe described the act as "consciousness of guilt." Bail for Hupp was set at $2,000,000 (equivalent to $2,683,000 in 2025). On December 16, a grand jury indicted Hupp on the charges. She appeared in court on January 31, 2017, pleading not guilty. In March 2017, prosecutors stated that they would seek the death penalty due to the apparently arbitrary choice of Gumpenberger as the victim. In May 2018, 11th Circuit Court judge Jon Cunningham ruled that prosecutors could not present evidence relating to the death of Hupp's mother; the following month, Cunningham ruled that prosecutors could present evidence relating to the killing of Betsy Faria. In August 2018, Hupp's trial date was set for June 2019.

Instead of contesting the charges at trial, Hupp entered an Alford plea, waiving her right to a jury trial. As a condition of her plea agreement, Hupp did not face the death penalty. She was sentenced to life without parole in August 2019. In a phone call to her then-husband, Hupp claimed that she had pleaded guilty so her family would not have to "witness an ugly trial." As of April 2025, Hupp is serving her sentence at the Chillicothe Correctional Center in Chillicothe, Missouri.

In October 2019, Gumpenberger's mother, Margaret Burch, filed a lawsuit for wrongful death, fraud and misrepresentation against the incarcerated Hupp. In July 2020, Burch was awarded a judgment of $3,000,000 (equivalent to $3,778,000 in 2025). Her attorney, Gary K. Burger, subsequently filed to garnish Hupp's prison trust account, into which her $1,200 (equivalent to $1,493 in 2025) COVID-19 CARES Act relief stimulus was paid. As of February 2022, the family had not received "any significant money" from Hupp. In June 2022, Burger's firm secured an initial payment of $783 (equivalent to $861 in 2025) garnished from money Hupp had earned working as a tutor in the Chillicothe Correctional Center. In 2025, Hupp's public defender filed a court motion stating that 100% of Hupp's wages were being garnished, as opposed to the 25% set out in the garnishment.

In September 2020, Hupp's husband Mark filed for divorce, describing their marriage as "irretrievably broken"; by March 2022, the couple were divorced. In September 2020, Hupp filed a motion to vacate her conviction, claiming she was pressured to take a plea; it was denied the following March as untimely.

== Media coverage ==
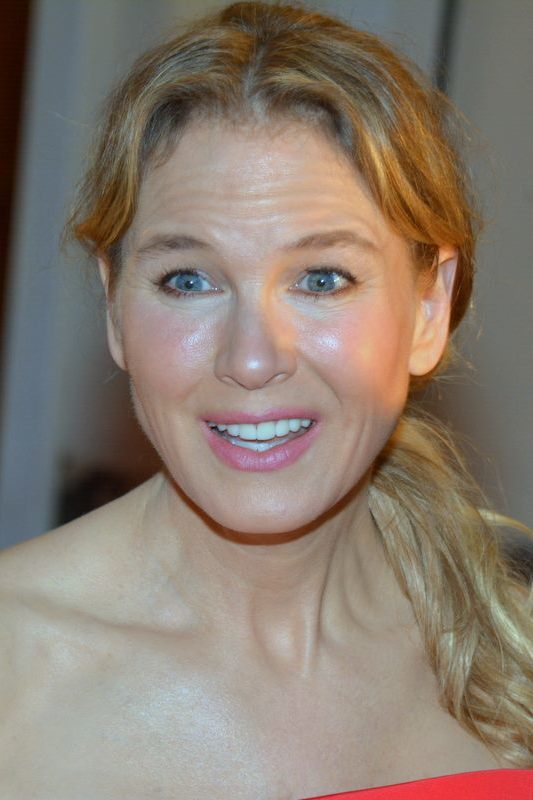
Renée Zellweger, who portrayed Pam Hupp in The Thing About Pam, a six-part television series.

St. Louis station KTVI broke the Betsy Faria story, reporting continuously on the case from 2011 through 2022, generating more than fifty reports and investigations. Chris Hayes of KTVI was the only reporter to attend Russ' first trial in November 2013, and the first to report questions about Hupp that same month; upon his release from prison, Russ thanked Hayes for his coverage.

Betsy's murder was the subject of six Dateline NBC episodes: "The House on Sumac Drive" (2014), "Game Night" (2015), "Return to Game Night" (2016), "Stranger Than Fiction" (2016), "The Thing About Pam" (2019) and "The Real Thing About Pam" (2022). As of 2019, the murder had received more coverage from Dateline than any other subject aside from the O. J. Simpson murder case and the death of JonBenét Ramsey. In September 2019, the murder of Louis Gumpenberger was the subject of a Dateline NBC true crime podcast. It spent several weeks as one of the most popular Apple podcasts.

In July 2019, filmmaker Daniel Blake Smith announced that he was writing and producing Proof, a feature film based on the stories of Russ and his defense attorney Joel Schwartz.

In October 2019, the Riverfront Times dubbed Hupp as St. Louis' "best local girl gone bad" of that year, observing that "few stories are quite so made-for-TV" and "the tale of Pam Hupp screams for serialization."

In February 2020, the murder of Louis Gumpenberger was featured on the Oxygen True Crime true crime television series Snapped.

In May 2020, NBC News Studios and Blumhouse Television announced that they were co-producing a new scripted television series based on the murder of Betsy Faria. In February 2021, they disclosed that the six-episode series would be called The Thing About Pam. Renée Zellweger, who had become interested in the case after becoming "obsessed" with the Dateline NBC podcast, served as executive producer for the series and also portrayed Hupp using facial prosthetics and a fatsuit. Other cast members included Josh Duhamel as Schwartz, Judy Greer as Askey and Katy Mixon as Betsy. Filming was conducted in New Orleans; it was delayed by Hurricane Ida but was underway by October 2021. During filming, Zellweger received criticism for wearing the fatsuit. In February 2022, it was reported that Blumhouse and NBC News Studios had declined to share profits from The Thing About Pam with the family of Louis Gumpenberger. The series began airing on NBC in March 2022.

The book Countdown to Murder: Pam Hupp, by Rebecca F. Pittman, was published in 2021. A book about the murder of Betsy Faria, by Joel Schwartz and Charles Bosworth Jr., Bone Deep: Untangling the Betsy Faria Murder Case, was published in 2022.

In August 2022, Betsy Faria's murder was featured on the podcast Method & Madness in which Betsy's daughter Mariah Day shared her story.

In August 2022, the case of Hupp and Faria was featured in an episode of People Magazine Investigates airing on Investigation Discovery and discovery+.

In September 2024, Hupp was featured in the Tubi true crime docuseries Ms. Murder.

In October 2026, the killing of Betsy Faria was featured in an episode of the second season of the CBS documentary series Harlan Coben's Final Twist.

== See also ==
- Crime in Missouri
- List of unsolved murders (2000–present)
