= Jon-Adrian Velazquez =

American actor

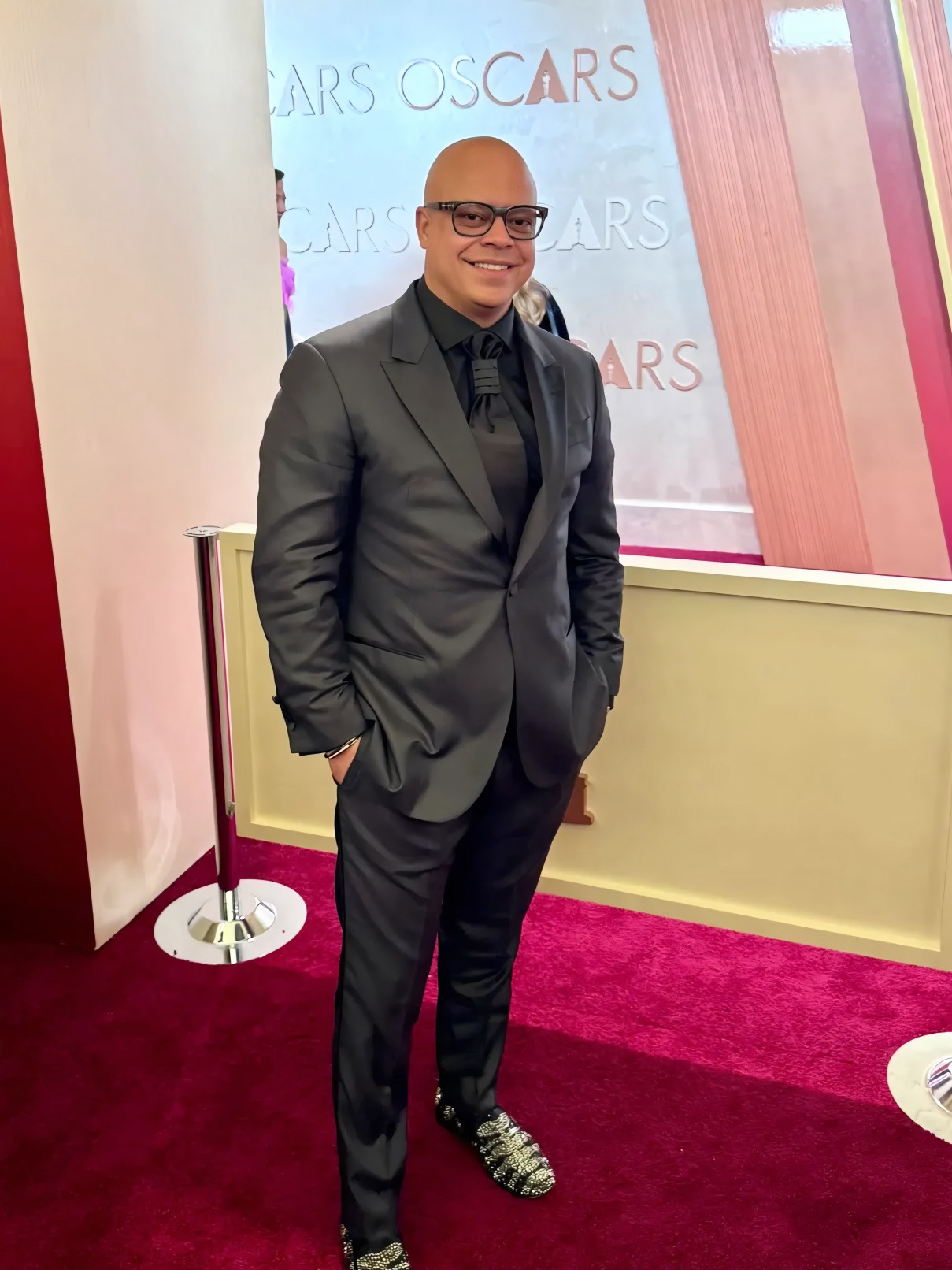
- Velazquez at the 97th Academy Awards
- Born: November 11, 1975 (age 50); New York City, New York, U.S.
- Other name: JJ Velazquez
- Education: Mercy University
- Occupations: Founder and CEO of Monumental Media and Voices From Within
- Spouse: Geri Leigh Tiu
- Children: 2
- Website: jonadrianjjvelazquez.com

Jon-Adrian Velazquez (born November 11, 1975), also known as "JJ" Velazquez, is an American legal reform activist, actor, film producer, and public speaker who was wrongfully convicted of a 1998 murder of a retired police officer. He was serving a 25 years to life sentence at maximum security Sing-Sing prison in New York. His case garnered considerable attention from the media ten years after his conviction, due to a long-term investigation by Dateline NBC producer Dan Slepian and celebrity support from actor Martin Sheen, actress Alfre Woodard, music executive Jason Flom, and entertainment company Roc Nation.

On May 8, 2022 The New York Times published an extensive feature on how Velazquez was Slepian's "one man innocent project" inside Sing Sing prison to help free several innocent men.

== The case ==
Retired NYPD officer Albert Ward was murdered during an attempted robbery of his illegal gambling establishment in Harlem, New York on January 27, 1998. Ward was involved in the running of the establishment at the time. Witnesses initially claimed that the two assailants were both black, and that the shooter was a black man with braids. Velazquez had short hair at the time.

== In the media ==
=== Dateline NBC investigation ===
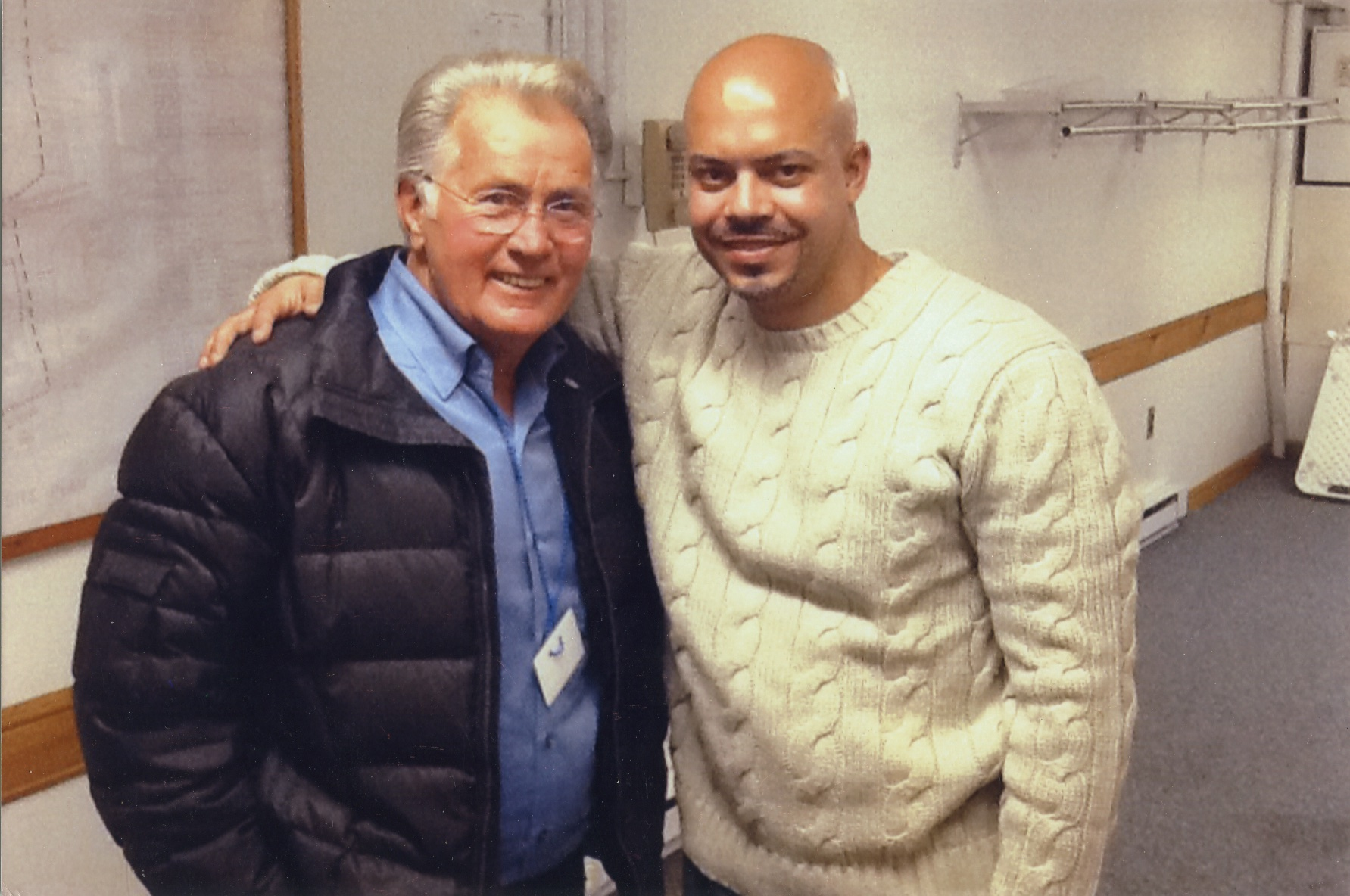
Martin Sheen with Velazquez in Sing Sing Prison, 2011

Beginning around 2002, Velazquez wrote letters to Dateline NBC producer Dan Slepian, after hearing about another one of Slepian's documentaries that resulted in getting another conviction overturned. Dateline producers began an investigation that lasted ten years, tracking down and interviewing witnesses and others involved in the case.

Velazquez contends that he was speaking on the phone with his mother at the time of the murder, a claim that is supported by phone records showing a call between Velazquez's residence and his mother. The prosecution contended that it was his girlfriend on the phone at the time. One witness who testified in court incorrectly identified a juror instead of Velazquez when asked to point out the perpetrator. Other witnesses were a heroin addict and a drug dealer. Velazquez was misidentified in the case by presenting one of the witnesses with hundreds of images of people previously convicted of unrelated crimes.

The broadcast about Velazquez's case aired nationally on NBC on February 12, 2012 and was nominated for three Emmy Awards.

The broadcast sparked a review of Velazquez's case by the Manhattan District Attorney's Conviction Integrity Unit. On April 5, 2013, the unit decided to let the conviction stand. In response to the DA's unwillingness to further pursue his bid for innocence, on May 2, 2013 his legal council officially files a motion 440 with the court in New York City.

On December 5, 2014, Velazquez's 440 motion—his request to have a hearing—was denied, but he appealed.

On June 27, 2017, Velazquez once again entered a 440 motion due to newly discovered documents that were never provided by the District Attorney's office to his original defense. This "Brady Material" was the basis for his new motion and as late as November 2017 even more undisclosed documents pertinent to his defense were discovered.

=== Narrative feature film development ===
In 2026, Variety reported that David Permut's Permut Presentations had acquired the life rights of Jon-Adrian "JJ" Velazquez, as well as rights to journalist Dan Slepian's reporting on Velazquez's case, for development as a narrative feature film. The planned film will focus on Velazquez's wrongful murder conviction and his decades-long relationship with Slepian, a senior investigative producer for Dateline, whose reporting investigated Velazquez's conviction and contributed to the effort that ultimately led to his exoneration.

The project is being produced by Permut Presentations in association with NBC News Studios. It follows Slepian's previous reporting about Velazquez, including the podcast Letters from Sing Sing, the documentary The Sing Sing Chronicles, and his 2024 book The Sing Sing Files.

=== The Sing Sing Chronicles ===
A 4-part docuseries The Sing Sing Chronicles directed by Dawn Porter, focusing on Velazquez's case from reporting by Dan Slepian, premiered in November 2024 at DOC NYC and streamed on MSNBC. On June 26, 2025, the docuseries won the News & Documentary Emmy Award Winner for "Best Documentary" marking the first time NBCUniversal has earned the prestigious honor.

=== The Sing Sing Files ===
In 2024, Dan Slepian published The Sing Sing Files: One Journalist, Six Innocent Men, and a Twenty-Year Fight for Justice, a book chronicling his investigations into wrongful convictions and his efforts to uncover failures in the criminal justice system. The book details Slepian's relationship with Jon-Adrian "JJ" Velazquez, whom he met while Velazquez was incarcerated at Sing Sing Correctional Facility. Velazquez became a close friend and collaborator, assisting Slepian with investigations into the cases of other incarcerated men while continuing to maintain his own innocence.

Slepian's investigation into Velazquez's conviction spanned approximately two decades and became a central part of his reporting on wrongful convictions. Velazquez was granted clemency in 2021 and was formally exonerated in 2024.

=== Sing Sing (film) ===
Velazquez co-stars with Colman Domingo, Paul Raci, and Clarence Maclin in the A24 prison drama that follows a group of incarcerated men who find purpose in acting in theater productions. Featuring an ensemble cast of formerly incarcerated actors, Sing Sing takes place at the Sing Sing Correctional Facility directed by Greg Kwedar and Clint Bentley. The film garnered three Oscar nominations in 2024.

=== 'Letters from Sing Sing' ===
On February 20, 2023, NBC News announced the launch of 'Letters From Sing Sing' an eight-episode podcast, the first from NBC News Studios, detailing Slepian's 20-year search for the truth and his journey with Velazquez along the way. The podcast was a Pulitzer Prize finalist for audio reporting in 2024.

== "Voices From Within" ==
In 2013, Velazquez led the formation of "Voices From Within" a comprehensive multimedia education initiative that addresses the epidemic of crime and incarceration directly through voices of incarcerated individuals living with the consequences of their choices, and the victims left in their wake while inside Sing Sing.

"Voices From Within" is a 501(c)(3) social impact peer-mentorship program that previously operated under a public domain license currently used by politicians as a tool to approach issues of gun violence in New York City. The success of the program led Velazquez to create a series of workshops called CHOICES (Choosing Healthier Options In Confronting Every Situation) about creating healthy communities through healthy decision making. These workshops empower young people impacted by crime and incarceration to realize the significance of making better life choices. In 2014, Velazquez curated the first TEDx Event held inside a New York State prison.

== Executive clemency ==
On August 17, 2021, Velazquez was granted clemency by New York Governor Andrew Cuomo and Secretary of State of New York Rossana Rosado. Velazquez's legal team and family issued the following statement. "We are elated that JJ Velazquez, a man who has spent more than two decades in prison for a crime he didn't commit, will finally be going home. And of course, we are deeply grateful to Governor Cuomo for this enlightened exercise of his executive clemency powers."

On September 9, 2021, after 23 years, 7 months and 8 days of imprisonment, Velazquez was freed from Sing Sing Correctional facility."

== Presidential apology ==
On October 18, 2022, President Joe Biden sat down with Velazquez to discuss criminal legal reform in part of NowThis's presidential forum. President Biden apologized to Velazquez on "behalf of all society" for his wrongful conviction.

== Exoneration ==
On September 30, 2024, Velazquez was exonerated by Manhattan D.A. Alvin Bragg. The Office joined in Velazquez's request to vacate the conviction and moved to dismiss the indictment in the interest of justice based on newly discovered DNA evidence. The motion was granted by Judge Abraham Clott. In response, Velazquez exclaimed, "This isn't a celebration," he said outside, adding, "This is an indictment of the system." He wore a baseball cap bearing the words "END OF AN ERROR."

== Civil lawsuit ==
Velazquez is suing New York City for $100 million, seeking accountability from officials he claims fabricated evidence and coerced witnesses, following his official exoneration in late 2024 after DNA evidence proved his innocence. His family also filed a separate $50 million suit, highlighting the devastating impact of wrongful conviction on them.
