= Dan Slepian =

American journalist

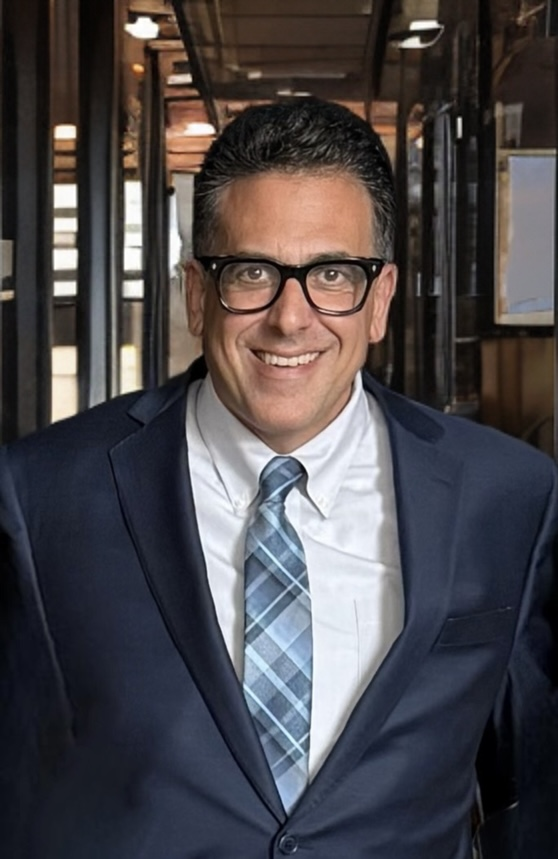
- Dan Slepian in 2025
- Born: New York
- Occupations: Journalist, investigative producer, author, podcaster
- Employer: NBC News
- Known for: Wrongful conviction investigations; Dateline NBC; Letters from Sing Sing; The Sing Sing Files

Dan Slepian is an American journalist, author, podcaster, and senior investigative producer at Dateline NBC. He is best known for his reporting on wrongful convictions and the U.S. criminal justice system, including the cases featured in his podcasts 13 Alibis, Letters from Sing Sing, The Last Appeal, The Widower, and his book, The Sing Sing Files: One Journalist, Six Innocent Men, and a Twenty-Year Fight for Justice. His work has earned national recognition, including being named a Pulitzer Prize finalist in Audio Reporting (2024) and winning the News & Documentary Emmy Award for Best Documentary (2025) for The Sing Sing Chronicles.

On September 30, 2026, Netflix released The Widower: 'Til Death Do Us Part, a documentary film based on Slepian's nearly two decades of reporting on the Las Vegas murder case involving Thomas Randolph. Slepian served as an executive producer and cinematographer on the film, which followed the earlier NBC 2021 Dateline series The Widower.

== Early life and education ==
Slepian grew up in Westchester County, New York, and graduated from White Plains High School, which inducted him into its Hall of Fame in October, 2025. He graduated from Stony Brook University in 1992, where he served two consecutive terms as student government president.

== Career ==
Slepian began his media career in NBC's Page Program. He served as an audience coordinator for The Phil Donahue Show before joining Dateline NBC in 1996.

At Dateline, he has produced dozens of investigations and documentaries, and developed three limited series: Vegas Homicide, Vegas Undercover, and Wild Wild Web.

Slepian frequently collaborates with anchor Lester Holt on justice-related programming, including Justice for All, a weeklong NBC News and MSNBC series examining the U.S. legal system. The series included Emmy-nominated specials filmed at Louisiana State Penitentiary (Angola Prison) and Sing Sing Correctional Facility.

=== Wrongful-conviction reporting and Sing Sing ===
In 2002, Slepian began documenting the re-investigation of the 1990 Thanksgiving night murder of a bouncer at the Palladium nightclub in Manhattan. Slepian’s reporting helped contribute to the eventual release of David Lemus and Olmedo Hidalgo after 13 years in prison. The story aired as the Dateline special In the Shadow of Justice (2007).

Lemus introduced Slepian to Jon-Adrian Velazquez, who also claimed he was innocent and asked Slepian to look into his case. Slepian's 20-year investigation into Velazquez’s conviction culminated in the 2023 podcast Letters from Sing Sing which was named a Pulitzer finalist.

Velazquez was granted clemency in 2021 and formally exonerated in 2024 after a review by the Manhattan District Attorney's Conviction Integrity Unit.

Over many years, Velazquez introduced Slepian to three other men who were also incarcerated at Sing Sing and wrongfully convicted: Eric Glisson, Richard Rosario, and Johnny Hincapie. Each man’s conviction was reopened and ultimately vacated following new evidence and reporting. His work on Rosario’s case became Dateline’s first podcast, 13 Alibis.

In January 2026, Slepian covered the decade-long relationship that filmmaker Rob Reiner and his wife Michele had with Nanon Williams, a Texas man incarcerated for more than three decades for a murder he maintains he did not commit. The work documented the personal bond that developed between the Reiners and Williams through years of correspondence and advocacy. During an on-camera interview with Slepian, Williams read an email from Michele Reiner sent in the hours before her death. Due to prison email delays, Michele’s email was delivered the day after she died. The coverage also referenced a letter written by Rob Reiner to the Harris County District Attorney’s Office urging Williams’ release, in which Reiner wrote, “I’ve led a high-profile life for over 50 years, and in that time I’ve met some very impressive and influential people. But if I’m being honest, apart from my father, no one has impressed me more or been more influential to me than Nanon Williams.”

=== The Sing Sing Chronicles ===
In 2024, NBC News Studios and MSNBC Films released The Sing Sing Chronicles, a four-part docuseries directed by Dawn Porter. Slepian is an executive producer on the docuseries and is the featured investigative journalist.

The series expanded on the cases featured in Slepian's book and podcast and received awards including the 2025 News & Documentary Emmy for Best Documentary, the Robert F. Kennedy Human Rights Journalism Award, and the Hillman Prize.

In 2026, Variety reported that David Permut's Permut Presentations had acquired the life rights of Jon-Adrian Velazquez, as well as rights to Slepian's reporting on Velazquez's case, for development as a narrative feature film. The planned film will focus on Velazquez's wrongful murder conviction and his decades-long relationship with Slepian, whose reporting investigated Velazquez's conviction and contributed to the effort that ultimately led to his exoneration.

The project is being produced by Permut Presentations in association with NBC News Studios. It follows Slepian's previous reporting about Velazquez, including the podcast Letters from Sing Sing, the documentary The Sing Sing Chronicles, and his 2024 book The Sing Sing Files.

=== Voices From Within ===
In 2013, Slepian co-founded the nonprofit Voices From Within with Jon-Adrian Velazquez, an initiative that supports incarcerated and formerly incarcerated individuals through storytelling and education programs created inside Sing Sing Correctional Facility.

=== The Widower ===
Slepian produced and filmed The Widower (2021), a three-part NBC/Peacock documentary that chronicled the case of Thomas Randolph, a Nevada man accused of murdering his wife and staging the crime scene. Slepian began following the case in 2008, documenting interviews and law enforcement operations over more than a decade.

In 2026, Slepian's reporting was revisited in the Netflix documentary film The Widower: 'Til Death Do Us Part, directed by Chris Smith. The film draws on footage Slepian accumulated while following the case for nearly two decades and chronicles his reporting on the case, including following Las Vegas homicide detective Dean O'Kelley. Slepian served as an executive producer on the film, which was produced by Library Films and NBC News Studios and released by Netflix on September 30, 2026.

== Podcasts ==
Slepian is the creator and host of 13 Alibis (2019) and Letters from Sing Sing (2023), produced by NBC News.

In 2025, his reporting on the case of Robert Roberson, a Texas man sentenced to death for the murder of his two-year-old daughter based on a diagnosis of shaken baby syndrome, led to the four-episode podcast series The Last Appeal, hosted by Lester Holt, which examined newly uncovered evidence in the days leading up to Roberson’s scheduled execution. Roberson has always maintained his innocence. As a result of Slepian's investigation, Roberson’s defense attorney filed a motion with the Texas Court of Criminal Appeals citing information discussed in the podcast; less than four hours after the last episode was released, Roberson was granted a stay of execution.

== Publications ==
=== The Sing Sing Files ===
In 2024, Slepian published The Sing Sing Files: One Journalist, Six Innocent Men, and a Twenty-Year Fight for Justice (Celadon Books). The book chronicles his decades-long investigations into wrongful convictions and the systemic failures of the U.S. criminal justice system, focusing on six men whose cases he reported on while at NBC News.

The book became a USA Today national bestseller, and received coverage in national media, including The New York Times and Vanity Fair. It received a starred review from Kirkus Reviews.
