= Skywire Live =

2013 Disney Channel special

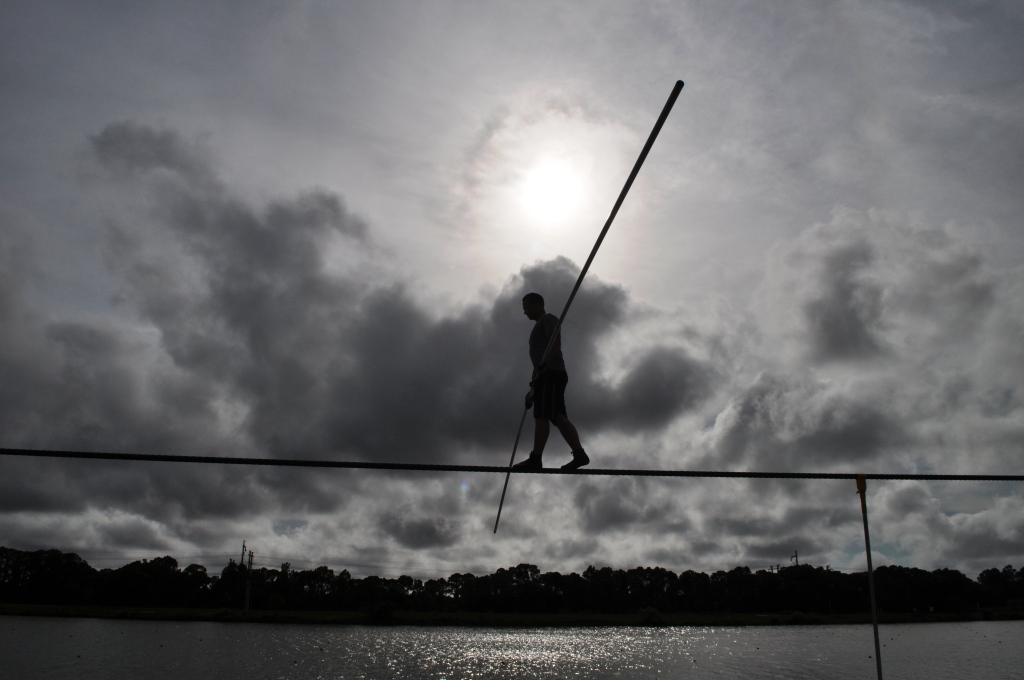
- Nik Wallenda trains for his Grand Canyon walk in Sarasota, Florida.
- Also known as: Skywire Live with Nik Wallenda
- Presented by: Natalie Morales; Willie Geist
- Starring: Nik Wallenda
- Country of origin: United States
- Original language: English

Production
- Executive producers: Peacock Productions: Gretchen Eisele; Benjamin Ringe; Knute Walker; Discovery Communications: Howard Swartz; Wallenda Inc.: Shelley Ross; David Simone; Winston Simone (Wallenda); Nik Wallenda
- Production locations: Little Colorado River Gorge, Colorado, US
- Running time: 140 minutes
- Production company: Peacock Productions

Original release
- Network: Discovery Channel
- Release: June 23, 2013

Skywire Live with Nik Wallenda is a Discovery Channel special that aired on June 23, 2013. The special was billed as a highwire walk across "the majestic Grand Canyon". Interpretations varied as to whether the actual location – the Little Colorado River Gorge in Navajo territory outside Grand Canyon National Park's borders – was truly part of the Grand Canyon.

Highwire artist Nik Wallenda had been planning to walk across the canyon since 2008, but put the plan on hold first due to logistical difficulties and then to highwire walk over Niagara Falls in 2012. After his success at Niagara, he accelerated plans to cross the canyon. In March 2013, Wallenda and Discovery came to terms on television rights for the walk.

To prepare, Wallenda practiced in his home town of Sarasota, Florida in heavy winds, including during Tropical Storm Andrea. On June 23, he successfully completed the walk without safety devices in approximately 23 minutes, making him the first person to tightrope walk across a Grand Canyon area gorge. At 1,500 feet (460 m), it was the highest walk of his career. Afterwards, Wallenda said it was more difficult than he had expected.

Skywire Live aired live in over 200 countries worldwide. It was a ratings success in the United States, generating Discovery's highest-ever rating for a live broadcast. The show also generated interest on social media, with Wallenda's public display of his Christian faith being a focal point.

== Background ==
Nik Wallenda is an American highwire artist and member of the famed Flying Wallendas circus family. He has been walking the wire since age two and now holds seven world records. In 2008, he set the record for highest and longest bicycle ride across a tightrope. In 2012, he became the first person to successfully tightrope walk directly over Niagara Falls. The feat aired live on ABC who, much to the dismay of Wallenda, decided at the last minute that he would have to wear a safety harness for the event.

The Grand Canyon area has played host to a number of high-profile stunts and daredevil feats. In 1922, Royal Thomas flew a Lincoln Standard biplane into Grand Canyon National Park, landing just 50 feet (15 m) from the Canyon's edge. The park did not yet have stunting regulations and the feat was approved by park superintendent Walter Crosby. In 1980, stuntman Dar Robinson drove a sports car over the canyon's edge, parachuting out of the car as it fell. He did the stunt in the Hualapai Indian Reservation after being denied a permit by the National Park. In 1999, daredevil Robbie Knievel jumped a narrow 228-foot-wide (69 m) portion of canyon in Hualapai territory on a motorcycle, breaking his own world record for longest jump in the process. The event aired live on Fox News. In 2006, Bob Burnquist skateboarded off a ramp into the canyon, descending to the bottom with a parachute. In 2011, Yves "Jetman" Rossy used a custom made jet suit to glide above the Hualapai reservation for eight minutes. He covered a distance of 5 miles (8.0 km) before parachuting into the canyon.

== Planning ==
Nik Wallenda originally secured permits to walk across "the Grand Canyon" in 2008, and planned to make the trip as early as 2009. However, the walk was delayed due to substantial logistical hurdles. His agent, Winston Simone, commented "There's no electricity [at the planned location], there's no hotels, and for the last half-hour there are no paved roads." Additionally, at a then-estimated distance of 5,000 feet (1,500 m), the feat would be the longest walk of Wallenda's career by a significant margin. When the opportunity to cross Niagara Falls arose, the Grand Canyon walk was put on hold. Shortly after crossing Niagara Falls, Wallenda said he would try to make the Grand Canyon crossing "within a year". In August 2012, he said that he was "98 percent" certain that the walk would take place in May or June 2013 and announced he would get "something in writing" that no safety harness would be required for the walk.

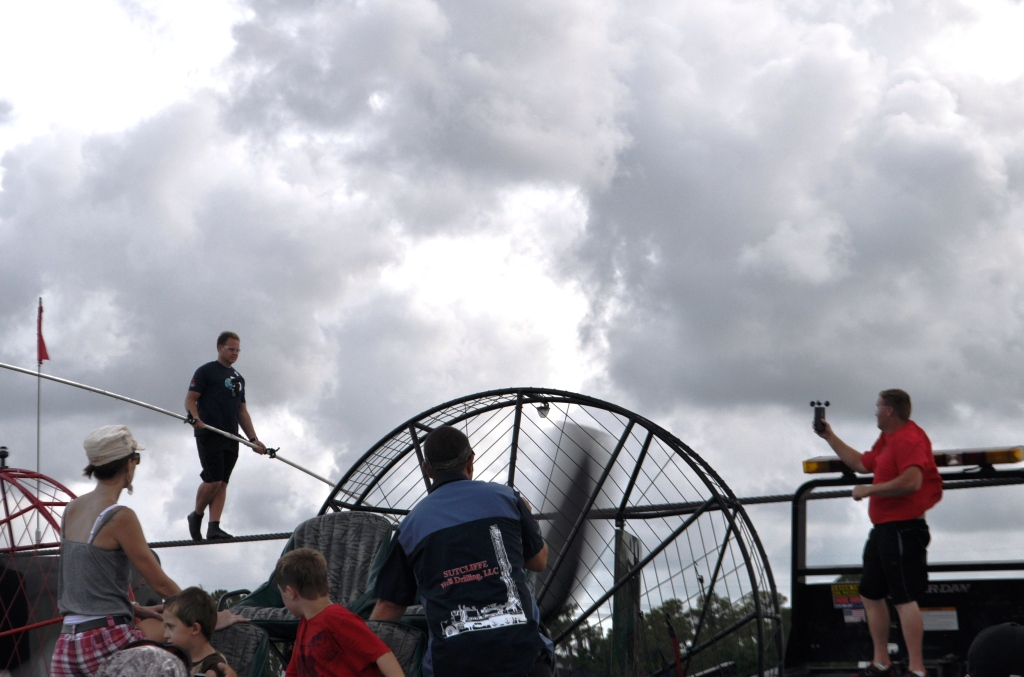
Wallenda simulates windy conditions using a large fan, June 14, 2013.

On March 18, 2013, Wallenda announced that he had come to terms with The Discovery Channel for television rights. ABC also bid for the walk, but was concerned about the show being repetitive with the Niagara walk and was not prepared to pay as much as Discovery. Additionally, Discovery emphasized its international footprint and promised Wallenda that he would not have to wear a safety device. After he came to terms with Discovery, both Wallenda and his network partners had to finalize permits with the Navajo. According to a tribal spokesperson, the decision to allow the walk was not taken lightly. The process included archaeological, biological, and environmental impact studies.

The air temperature during the walk was expected to exceed 90 °F (32 °C), with the steel cable hitting 100 to 110 °F (38 to 43 °C). To prepare, Wallenda walked a 1,000-foot (300 m) wire twice daily along the banks of a Sarasota river with fans watching. He practiced with wind machines to simulate wind gusts up to 91 miles per hour (146 km/h). During Tropical Storm Andrea he practiced among 52 miles per hour (84 km/h) wind gusts and heavy rain. Wallenda said it was "hard to prepare for [the updrafts] ... when it comes down to Mother Nature, we're not in control." His highwire shoes, which are custom made by his mother, had elk-skin bottoms to counteract the heat.

On June 19, Discovery aired a special episode of MythBusters titled "Duct Tape Canyon" to coincide with Wallenda's walk. On the episode, Wallenda appears to the show's team as a hallucination as they attempt to survive in the desert using only duct tape.

== Location ==
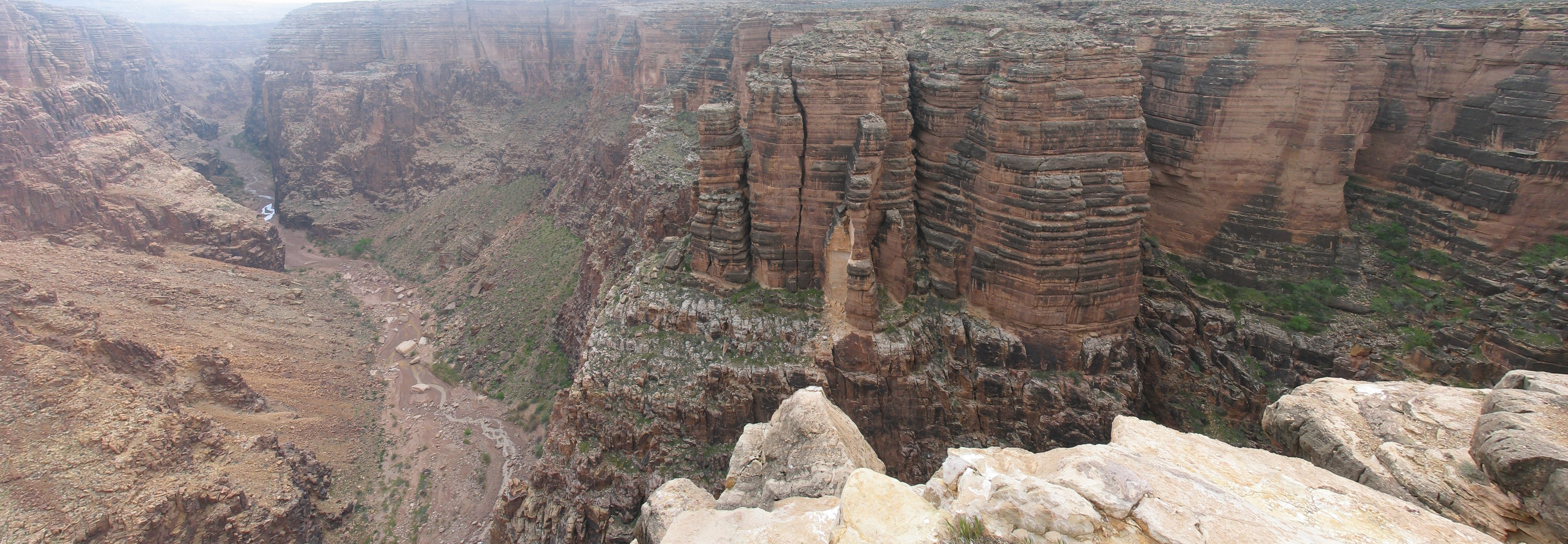
Little Colorado River gorge near Grand Canyon National Park.

On June 23, 2013, Wallenda highwire walked across the Little Colorado River Gorge in the Navajo Tribal Park. The location was outside Grand Canyon National Park's borders, about 40 miles east of the main tourist facilities. In its official press release, Discovery previewed the feat "Nik Wallenda ... will traverse the majestic Grand Canyon". Other interpretations of whether or not the location was part of the Grand Canyon varied. The Reuters news agency described the location as simply "the Grand Canyon", while the Associated Press described it as a "gorge near the Grand Canyon." Commentary by Forbes writer Andrew Bender said there was "one problem" with the walk – "It [wasn't] at the Grand Canyon". He did, however, say the risks were as real and the visuals as spectacular at the location. National Geographic described the location as "the Grand Canyon" but noted that, like previous "Grand Canyon" stunts, it was taking place outside the park's borders.

According to the United States Geological Survey, the Grand Canyon geological area includes the Little Colorado River Gorge. A Grand Canyon National Park spokesperson said the walk "would not have been approved" to take place in the Park due to regulations that "events must not unreasonably impair the park's atmosphere of peace and tranquility or have an unacceptable impact on the experience of park visitors."

== The walk ==
The event, entitled Skywire Live, aired live on the Discovery Channel in 219 countries with a 10-second delay. Coverage began with an hour-and-ten-minute preshow, followed by an hour-and-ten-minute main event. It was produced by NBC through its cable arm Peacock Productions and hosted by Natalie Morales and Willie Geist. During the event, viewers were able to select from five different camera angles online at SkywireLive.com, including one attached to his chest that faced straight down. Another camera attached to Wallenda faced straight ahead, and a film crew filmed from the bottom of the Canyon.

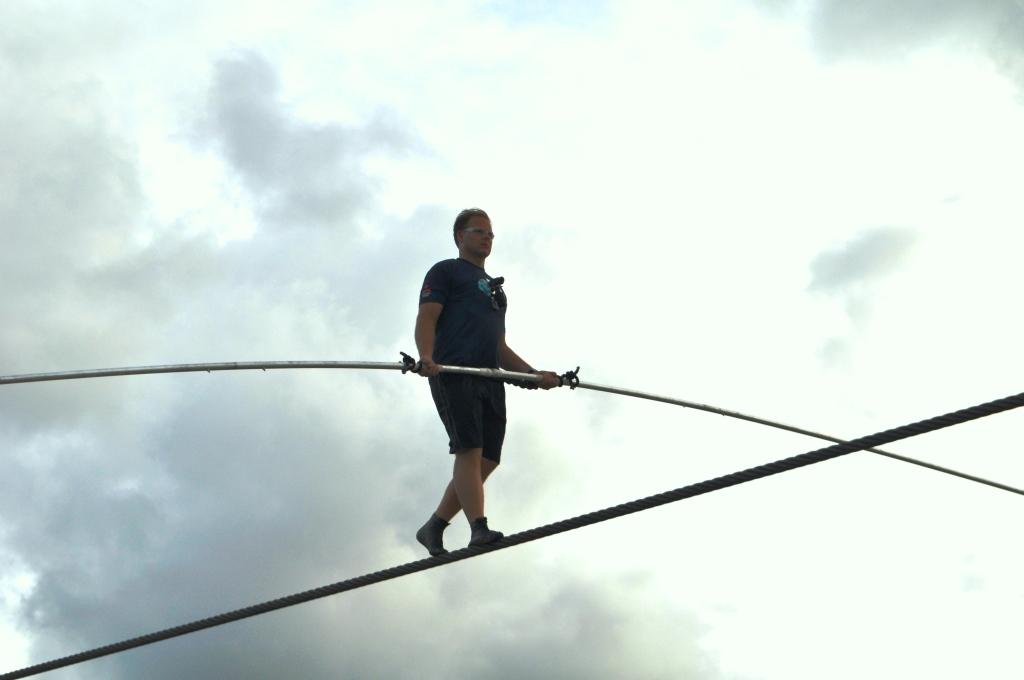
Wallenda practices walking the wire in Sarasota, Florida on June 14, 2013.

Before the walk started, Wallenda and his family prayed with televangelist and family friend Joel Osteen. He was then helicoptered to an island in the middle of the canyon to start his journey. To limit environmental impact, the event was not open to the public. Members of the press were required to sign a waiver saying they would not sue for post-traumatic stress disorder in the event that Wallenda fell. An armed security guard was positioned at the bottom of the canyon to protect his body from animals.

As the walk began at 7:38pm MDT, Wallenda realized the wire had become slippery due to gathered dust. He spat on his hands and rubbed his shoes for better grip. Shortly thereafter, he stopped and crouched down on the wire due to wind gusts. He later stopped a second time to break the bounce of the wire that his walking had induced. Throughout the walk, Wallenda could be heard praying, repeatedly saying "Help me to relax, Lord", "God, you're so good. Thank you for this opportunity, Lord", and "Thank you, Jesus." Midway through he said "Thank you Lord. Thank you for calming that cable, God". Wallenda ran the last few steps then jumped off and kissed the ground. Completing the walk in 22 minutes, 54 seconds, Wallenda became the first person to highwire walk across a Grand Canyon area gorge.

At 1,500 feet (460 m), the walk was the highest of Wallenda's career, about seven times as high as the Niagara crossing. He covered a distance of approximately 1,400 feet (430 m) in 22 minutes, 54 seconds, using 2-inch-thick (5.1 cm) wire. He carried a 30-foot-long (9.1 m) balancing pole weighing 43 pounds (20 kg). Wallenda said it was important for him to vary his pace throughout the walk to prevent resonance effects. Terry and Mike Troffer were his safety coordinator and chief engineer, respectively, for the event.

Commenting on the walk, a Navajo spokesman said, "We are honored to be a part of this historic event and showcase the beauty that exists on Navajo country," and said he expected the event to boost tourism. Tribal president Ben Shelly said he was grateful for the publicity. "It's exposing what a beautiful land we have", he said. "Another nation exists, and it's the Navajo Nation." However, a group of Navajo and other Native Americans protested the event saying the tribe should not be promoting the risking of human life to promote tourism. The Navajos did not charge for the use of the site, but Discovery did pay for the paving of a new road and parking lot to accommodate spectators.

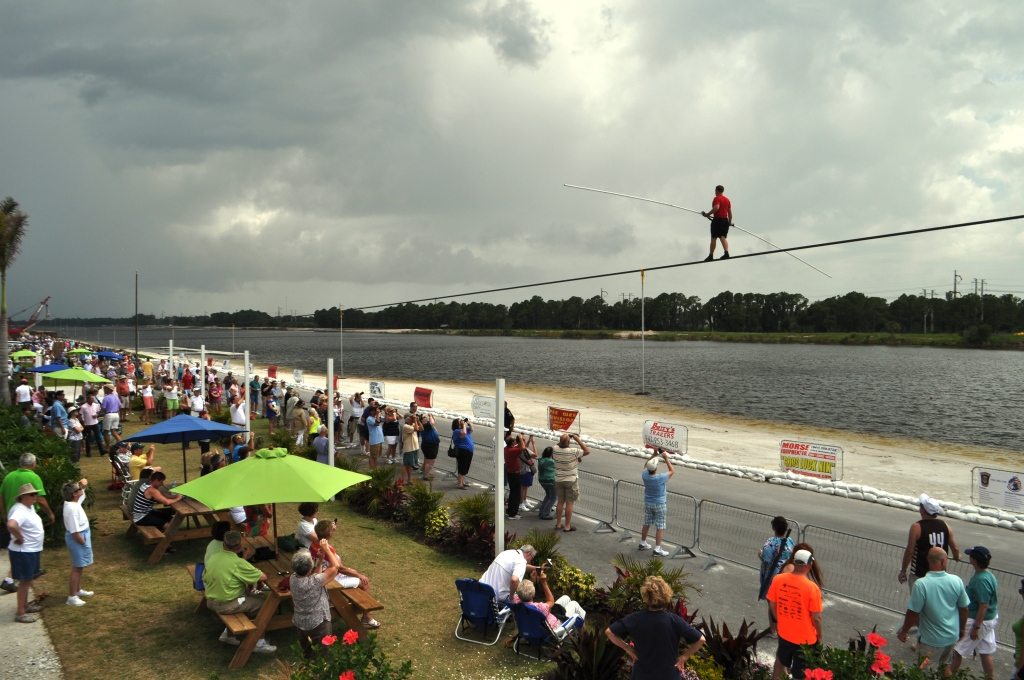
A crowd gathers to watch Wallenda practice for his Grand Canyon walk

After the walk, Wallenda said it was more difficult than he had expected and that "it took every bit of me to stay focused". He said that dust had accumulated in his contact lenses and called the walk unusually stressful. Additionally, he said an "optical illusion" made it hard to concentrate. However, he called the view breathtaking, and said the opportunity "was a dream come true."

== Ratings ==
Skywire Live With Nik Wallenda drew an average of 10.7 million viewers in the United States, making it the highest rated program of the night. It beat out NBC's Crossing Lines (4.4 million viewers) and CBS's 60 Minutes (8.2 million) among other offerings. Viewership increased steadily throughout the program, with a spike as the walk itself began. During the walk, 13 million people were tuned in. Those numbers made Skywire Live the highest rated live program in Discovery's history, easily beating the 4.21 million people who watched Felix Baumgartner's skydive in October 2012, and third-highest overall. The 4.77 share during the actual walk was also the highest in company history. Pre-coverage of the walk also pulled in high numbers, attracting 6.25 million viewers. Naked and Afraid which debuted after Skywire attracted 4.16 million viewers. Overall, Discovery had its fourth highest-ranked night ever.

Online coverage attracted 2.1 million viewers, and tweets hit 40,000 per minute. During the peak hour, the program had 648,000 mentions on Twitter. The premiere of a "Snuffy the Seal" advertising campaign for Shark Week during the special also attracted attention on social media during the special. Overall, the show won 71% of TV-related social media usage for the day.

To capitalize on the program's success, Discovery aired a follow-up interview, Skywire: Nik Talks the Walk, on June 30. In the special, Wallenda provided commentary on his walk as the entire 23 minute feat was replayed.

== Reaction ==
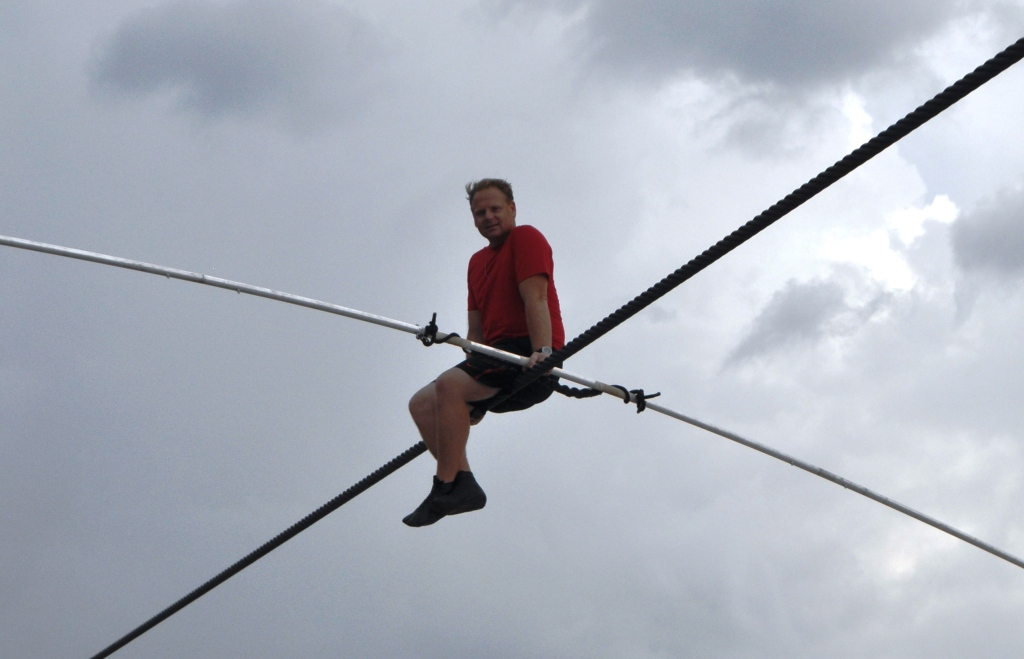
Wallenda sits on the wire during a June 16 practice.

Commentary by Sally Jenkins published by the Washington Post called Wallenda "The ultimate athlete, free of all law except gravity ... Beyond criticism. Committing a pointless act — yet praying." Jenkins remarked "We thought daredevils were gone — too much science had reduced them to the predictable ... But along has come this new breed." Comparing Wallenda and Baumgartner's record skydive that also aired on Discovery, she speculated that the emergence of online media combined with "stale, stupid predictability" of television shows has led the re-emergence of interest in daredevil activity. She concluded "Wallenda's meaningless act restored the meaning of real." The Telegraph's Ben Fogle declared "I have never felt such fear for another person ... I have a new superhero: not a superman with a cape, but a slightly tubby dad in jeans and a T-shirt."

On social media, Wallenda's prominent display of his faith was the most popular topic. Conservative talk show host Dana Loesch tweeted "Evangelism via entertainment on a tightrope and a major cable network. Brilliant." In contrast comedian and noted atheist Ricky Gervais poked fun saying "Well done Jesus for getting that bloke across the Grand Canyon safely. I bet he feels silly for wasting so much time practicing now." Actor Dean Norris remarked "Regardless of religious belief or not, feel little happier bout life than had #wallenda kept saying thank you nihilists, life is meaningless." Interviewing Joel Osteen after Wallenda's walk, Piers Morgan called the event "an advertisement for the power of prayer and Christianity in America".

Blue jeans manufacture Buffalo David Bitton was surprised that Wallenda wore a pair of their jeans for the walk. To celebrate, they erected a billboard showing a picture of the walk and reading "Dear Nik, Thanks for taking us to new heights. Buffalo David Bitton." The company also offered Wallenda and his immediate family free jeans for the rest of their lives.
