= MS NOW Films =

American television documentary unit

- Formerly: MSNBC Films (2020–2025); MSNBC Documentaries (until 2016, as an umbrella title)
- Type: Division
- Industry: Television production
- Headquarters: New York City, United States
- Parent: MS NOW
- Website: ms.now/films-2

MS NOW Films (formerly MSNBC Films) is a unit of MS NOW which produces documentaries, and a division of Versant. It originally began as MSNBC Documentaries, an umbrella title of a series of documentaries co-produced by NBC News and MSNBC.

Compared to competing networks, MS NOW airs documentaries on a daily basis and on weekend afternoons and evenings.

== History ==
When it was known as MSNBC Documentaries, each documentary was given its own title to broadcast under (e.g., Lockup: Return to Pelican Bay) or was produced under one of the titles below. The program has had multiple hosts, including Ann Curry, Lester Holt, Matt Lauer, and Stone Phillips; it did not have a single consistent host, and certain episodes only had a voice-over throughout.

In April 2008, MSNBC released Meeting David Wilson. Following this, MSNBC Films launched for the first time in June 2008. Its first film was Dear Zachary: A Letter to a Son About His Father. This was later followed by Witch Hunt in November 2008, premiering worldwide at the 2008 Toronto International Film Festival. On October 25, 2010, MSNBC Films released The Assassination of Dr. Tiller, a documentary exploring the murder of George Tiller, presented by Rachel Maddow and co-produced with Peacock Productions.

In 2012 and 2013, and again in 2016, weekend airtime for MSNBC Documentaries was reduced to make room for newer weekend political news talk shows, relegating documentary series to weekend evenings.

In 2020, NBC News Studios revived MSNBC Films as a unit for feature-length documentaries. On June 26, 2025, The Sing Sing Chronicles was awarded the News & Documentary Emmy Award for Best Documentary at the 46th News and Documentary Emmy Awards.

In November 2025, following MSNBC's spin off from NBCUniversal to Versant, the unit was renamed to MS NOW Films.

== Program titles ==
=== Distributed under MSNBC Documentaries ===
The former logo of MSNBC Documentaries

- Headliners and Legends with Matt Lauer
- MSNBC Reports
- MSNBC Investigates
- Crime & Punishment
- Lockup
- To Catch a Predator
- Warrior Nation
- Hooked (Tattoos Head to Toe and Muscle Women)
- Caught on Camera
- The Assassination of Dr. Tiller
- Hubris: Selling the Iraq War
- Why We Did It

=== Distributed under MSNBC Films ===
- Dear Zachary: A Letter to a Son About His Father (2008)
- Witch Hunt (2008)
- Witness to Jonestown (2008)
- The Assassination of Dr. Tiller (2010)
- The Way I See It (2020)
- In the Dark of the Valley (2021)
- Four Seasons Total (2021)
- Paper & Glue (2021)
- Memory Box: Echoes of 9/11 (2021)
- Love & the Constitution (2022)
- Diamond Hands: The Legend of WallStreetBets (2022)
- The Turning Point (2022)
- Model America (2022)
- Separated (2024)
- From Russia With Lev (2024)
- The Sing Sing Chronicles (2024)
- King of the Apocalypse (2025)
