= Proffer =

Legal and business term

A proffer is an offer made prior to any formal negotiations.

In a trial, to proffer (sometimes profer) is to offer evidence in support of an argument (for example, as used in U.S. law), or elements of an affirmative defense or offense. A party with the burden of proof must proffer sufficient evidence to carry that burden. For example, in support of a particular argument, a party may proffer documentary evidence or witnesses.

Where a party is denied the right to introduce evidence because that evidence would be inflammatory, hearsay, or would lack sufficient authentication, that party must make a proffer of what the evidence would have shown in order to preserve the issue for appeal through a formal procedure, such as an offer of proof.

As in business, a proffer can be a sign of "good faith" a first offer or proposal, to show a willingness to "barter".

== Etymology ==
The word proffer is derived from Anglo-French "por-", forth, and "offrir", to offer.

== See also ==
- Due process
- Jury trial
- Offer of proof
- Preliminary hearing
- Proffer agreement
- Trial by ordeal
- Unofficial hearing
