= The Sing Sing Chronicles =

American documentary series

- Genre: Documentary
- Directed by: Dawn Porter
- Country of origin: United States
- Original languages: English; Spanish
- No. of episodes: 4

Production
- Executive producers: Dawn Porter; Kimberly Ferdinando; Dan Slepian; Liz Cole; Elizabeth Fischer; Andy Berg; Amanda Spain; Rashida Jones; Rebecca Kutler
- Producers: Lauren Capps; Sadie Bass; Nick McElroy (Additional Producer)
- Cinematography: Dan Slepian; Bryant Fischer; Rich White; Sean Gallagher
- Editor: Rosie Walunas
- Production companies: NBC News Studios; MSNBC Films; Trilogy Films

Original release
- Network: MSNBC
- Release: November 23 – November 24, 2024

The Sing Sing Chronicles is an American documentary series directed and produced by Dawn Porter. It follows reporter Dan Slepian who forms a bond with Jon-Adrian Velazquez at Sing Sing Correctional Facility, with the two embarking on a journey for justice.

It world premiered at DOC NYC on November 16, 2024, and premiered on November 23–24, 2024, on MSNBC. An encore presentation of the docuseries airs on July 26, 2025 on MSNBC.

== Premise ==
Reporter Dan Slepian who forms a bond with Jon-Adrian Velazquez, who was incarcerated at Sing Sing Correctional Facility, with the two embarking on a journey for justice. Additionally the series explores the stories of five additional wrongfully convicted men.

== Production ==
The series is based upon 1,000 hours of footage, shot from 2022 to present day.

== Recognition ==
On June 26, 2025, the docuseries won the News & Documentary Emmy Award Winner for "Best Documentary" marking the first time NBCUniversal has earned the prestigious honor. Among other awards include the 2025 Hillman Prize for Broadcast Journalism and 2025 Gracie Award Winner.
