= Separated (film) =

2024 American documentary film

- Release poster
- Directed by: Errol Morris
- Produced by: Errol Morris; Robert Fernandez; Molly O'Brien; Steven Hathaway
- Starring: Gabriela Cartol; Diego Armando Lara Lagunes
- Edited by: Steven Hathaway
- Music by: Paul Leonard-Morgan
- Production companies: NBC News Studios; Participant; Fourth Floor; Moxie Pictures
- Distributed by: MSNBC Films
- Release dates: August 29, 2024 (Venice); October 4, 2024 (United States)
- Running time: 91 minutes
- Country: United States
- Languages: English; Spanish
- Box office: $8,766

Separated is a 2024 American documentary film, directed and produced by Errol Morris. It is based upon Separated: Inside an American Tragedy by Jacob Soboroff. It stars Gabriela Cartol and Diego Armando Lara Lagunes, in fictional reenactments. The film explores the Trump administration family separation policy.

It had its world premiere at the 81st Venice International Film Festival on August 29, 2024, and was released in a limited release on October 4, 2024, by MSNBC Films, prior to a broadcast on MSNBC on December 7, 2024. It received positive reviews from critics.

== Premise ==
The film explores the Trump administration family separation policy, intertwined with a migrant family's plight, played by Gabriela Cartol and Diego Armando Lara Lagunes, alongside interviews.

== Production ==
Errol Morris read Jacob Soboroff's book, Separated: Inside an American Tragedy and wanted to make it into a film. NBC News Studios and Participant financed the film, with NBC assisting with archival.

== Release ==
The film had its world premiere at the 81st Venice International Film Festival on August 29, 2024. It also screened at the 51st Telluride Film Festival on August 31, 2024. In October 2024, MSNBC Films acquired distribution rights to the film, setting it for an October 4, 2024, limited release and December 7, 2024, broadcast.

== Reception ==
=== Box office ===
In the United States and Canada, the film made $8,766 from one theaters in its opening weekend.

=== Critical response ===
Separated on review aggregator Rotten Tomatoes holds a 97% approval rating based upon 29 reviews, with an average rating of 7.8/10. On Metacritic, it has a weighted average score of 75 out of 100 based on 13 reviews, indicating "generally favorable" reviews.
