= Offer of proof =

An offer of proof is a kind of motion that a lawyer may present to a judge or to the official presiding over a hearing. It is an explanation made by an attorney to a judge during trial to show why a question which has been objected to as immaterial or irrelevant will lead to evidence of value to proving the case of the lawyer's client. Often the judge will ask: "Where is this line of questions going?" and the offer of proof is the response. The offer provides the opposition a preview of the questions (and helps prevent surprise), but is essential to overcome the objections.

In the context of a trial or a hearing, a presiding judge may issue a ruling denying a party the right to proffer evidence. The party aggrieved by this ruling then has the right to indicate for the record what the evidence would have shown had the adverse ruling not been issued. This is necessary in order to preserve the issue for appeal.

In jury trials, offers of proof may be made outside the hearing of the jury. A party may request a motion in limine (Latin: "at the threshold") made before the start of a trial requesting that the judge rule that certain evidence may, or may not, be introduced to the jury in a trial. Once the trial has begun such motions are made out of hearing of the jury (either at the bench, or with the jury excused from the courtroom) and for a party to be allowed to continue questioning a witness outside the hearing of the jury until the judge can determine whether the evidence sought is admissible.

== See also ==
- Due process
- Jury trial
- Preliminary hearing
- Administrative law judge
