= Keith Morrison =

Canadian broadcast journalist (born 1947)

- Born: July 2, 1947 (age 79); Lloydminster, Saskatchewan, Canada
- Education: University of Saskatchewan
- Occupation: NBC News correspondent
- Years active: 1966–present
- Spouse: Suzanne Langford (m. 1981)
- Children: 5

Keith Morrison (born July 2, 1947) is a Canadian broadcast journalist. Since 1995, he has been a correspondent for Dateline NBC.

== Career ==
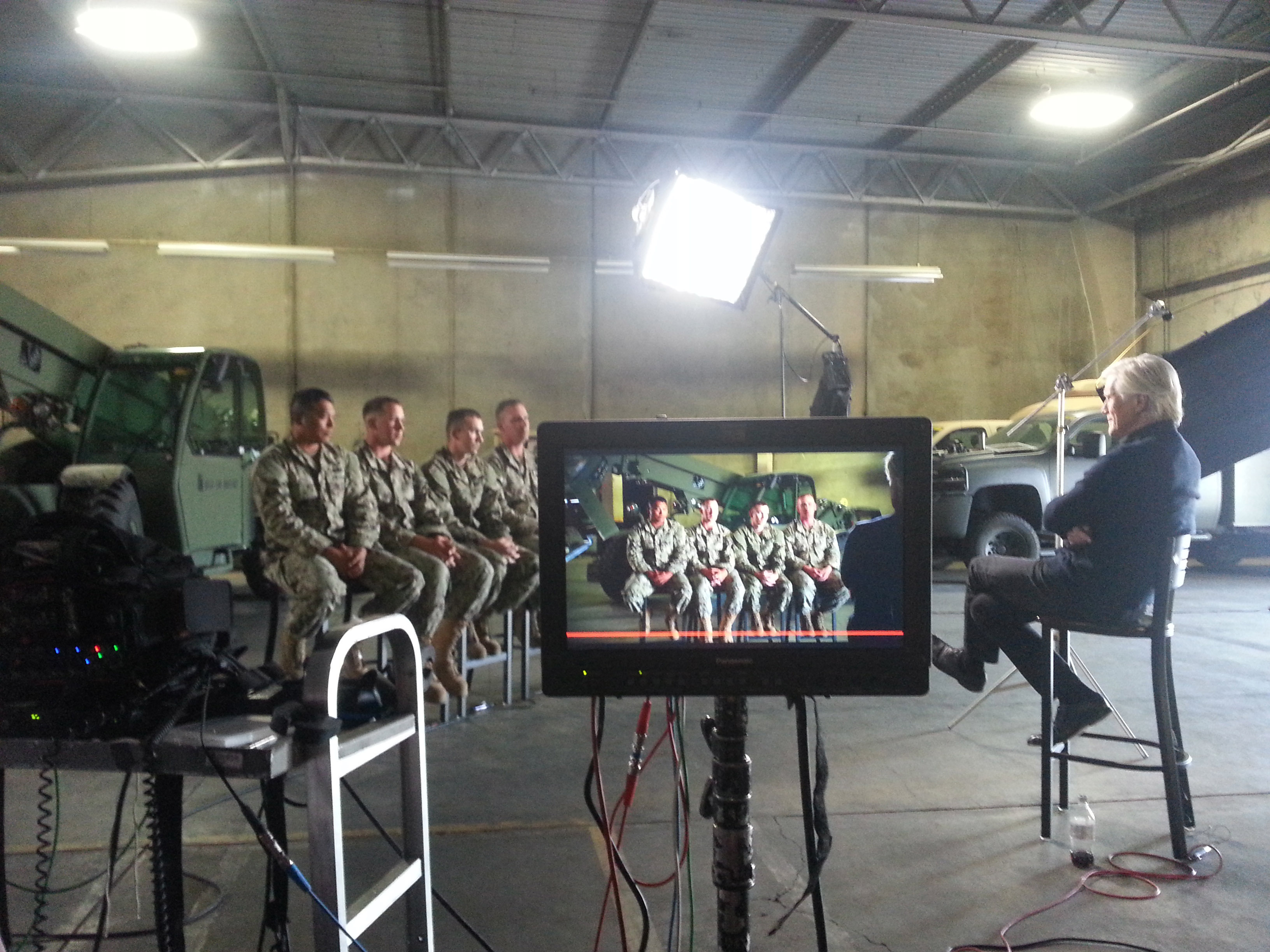
Morrison conducting an interview for Dateline in 2013

Beginning his career in the 1960s, Morrison was a reporter and anchor at local stations in Saskatchewan, Vancouver, British Columbia and Toronto, Ontario.

He joined CTV's Canada AM in 1973 as a newsreader and also worked as a reporter and weekend anchor as well as a producer. As a reporter at CTV, he won awards for his coverage of the Yom Kippur War. From 1975 to 1976, he was a reporter on CTV National News and served as National Affairs Correspondent and substitute anchor on the show from 1976 to 1979.

Morrison joined the Canadian Broadcasting Corporation in 1982 as substitute anchor and Chief Political Correspondent for The Journal, the network's nightly public affairs program, remaining until 1986. He also co-hosted Midday, the network's noon-hour newsmagazine that he helped to create, from 1984 to 1985.

He moved to Los Angeles in 1986 as the 5 p.m. and 11 p.m. news anchor for KNBC-TV. In 1988 he joined NBC News as a west coast correspondent for the NBC Nightly News and Today Show. Morrison covered the Tiananmen Square protests of 1989 and later contributed highly acclaimed hour-long documentaries and magazine segments to various NBC programs while concurrently continuing as KNBC's anchor.

Morrison returned to Canada in 1992 to become co-anchor of the leading national morning news program, Canada AM on CTV. He also hosted The Editors on PBS. He was the substitute anchor for CTV National News and the heir apparent to anchor Lloyd Robertson until 1995, when he was ousted in a network shakeup. It was believed at the time that he was campaigning to replace Robertson. While at Canada AM, then Prime Minister Brian Mulroney cancelled a live appearance after Morrison jokingly referred to him earlier in the show as "whatshisname".

Morrison returned to NBC in 1995 as a correspondent for Dateline NBC, his position as of 2023. He appeared as a newscaster in an episode of Seinfeld, "The Trip". In the episode, he reported the arrest of Kramer as a serial killer.

Morrison's interviews on Dateline have kept audiences watching and attracted the attention of comedians as well. Saturday Night Live created a sketch with him as the central figure played by Bill Hader on November 22, 2008. And on an episode of Late Night with Seth Meyers that aired on July 9, 2014, Morrison appears as himself, parodying his characteristic dramatic delivery of real-life murder mysteries that he is known for on Dateline.

== Personal life ==
In 1981, Morrison married Suzanne Perry (née Langford), a writer, consultant, one-time news anchor and political fundraiser who was also press secretary to former Canadian prime minister Pierre Trudeau. They have four children. Morrison also has a son from a previous marriage, and was the stepfather of actor Matthew Perry, Suzanne's son from a previous marriage to actor John Bennett Perry.

Following Matthew Perry's death in 2023, the Morrisons launched the Matthew Perry House to support people recovering from addiction.

== Parodies ==
Morrison's reporting style has been parodied on Saturday Night Live by cast member Bill Hader. On the March 30, 2009, episode of Late Night with Jimmy Fallon, Hader, referencing the fact that Morrison works in 30 Rockefeller Plaza, where both Dateline NBC and Saturday Night Live are produced, jokingly stated that he lived in fear of getting into the same elevator as Morrison. The two actually would meet during a Hader interview on Weekend Today. "I can't give him pointers, he's the master," Hader said. "I don't know how you get better than Keith Morrison."
