= Peacock Productions =

Documentary arm of NBC News

- Type: Division
- Industry: Television production
- Predecessor: NBC News Productions; NBC Next Media; NBC Media Productions
- Founded: July 15, 2007; 19 years ago
- Defunct: March 2, 2020; 6 years ago
- Fate: Closed
- Successor: NBC News Studios
- Headquarters: New York City, United States
- Key people: Liz Cole (president)
- Owner: NBCUniversal
- Parent: NBCUniversal News Group
- Website: www.peacockproductions.tv

Peacock Productions was a long-form production unit of NBC News. The division, established on July 15, 2007, primarily produced one-off factual programs and specials, airing across both NBCUniversal and third-party networks. Peacock served as an incubator for new production technologies that have later been adopted by NBC News, such as tapeless recording.

The studio was shut down on March 2, 2020, with NBC News citing changes to its strategies on documentaries.

== History ==
Peacock was established on July 15, 2007 by the merger of NBC News Productions, NBC Media Productions, & the digital unit NBC Next Media, along with the staff of NBC's newsmagazine Dateline. The merger came in response to the growing popularity of non-fiction programming on television (with a particular emphasis on cable channels and digital outlets), and in the wake of a recent series of budget cuts at NBC Universal that affected NBC News's long-form production units

In May 2012, Today senior producer Marc Victor stepped down and joined Peacock to lead a new unit, Tomorrow Productions — which would leverage the resources and talent of Today. In 2013, Peacock produced Skywire Live for Discovery Channel, a live special that featured Nik Wallenda's crossing of the Little Colorado River gorge near Grand Canyon National Park.

The studio shut down on March 2, 2020, with NBC News stating that it was "shifting its documentary strategy to an entirely new model, consistent with industry trends". An employee reported that streaming video had reduced the demand for the type of low-cost documentaries traditionally made by Peacock. It was eventually replaced by NBC News Studios, which maintains production of many NBC News programming.

== Television ==
Title	Year released	Channel
Sister Wives: Tell All	2018	TLC
Keith Morrison Investigates	2015–present	Investigation Discovery
Killing Versace: The Hunt for a Serial Killer	2018	Oxygen
Simone Biles: American Gold	2018	Lifetime
Final Appeal	2018	Oxygen
Why Planes Crash	2009-2015	MSNBC and Weather Channel
Headliners	1999–present	MSNBC
USS Indianapolis Live - From the Deep	2017	PBS
Surviving Harvey	2017	Animal Planet
Behind Closed Doors with Natalie Morales	2017	Reelz
Phelps vs. Shark	2016	Discovery
