= Dateline NBC =

American television reality legal series

- Also known as: Dateline
- Genre: Newsmagazine; True crime
- Presented by: Lester Holt (for past anchors, see section)
- Composer: Michael Karp (1992–2007)
- Country of origin: United States
- Original languages: English; Spanish
- No. of seasons: 34

Production
- Executive producers: Liz Cole; Paul Ryan
- Camera setup: Single-camera
- Running time: 2 hours (including commercials)
- Production company: Peacock Productions

Original release
- Network: NBC; Telemundo
- Release: March 31, 1992 – present

Related
- NBC Nightly News

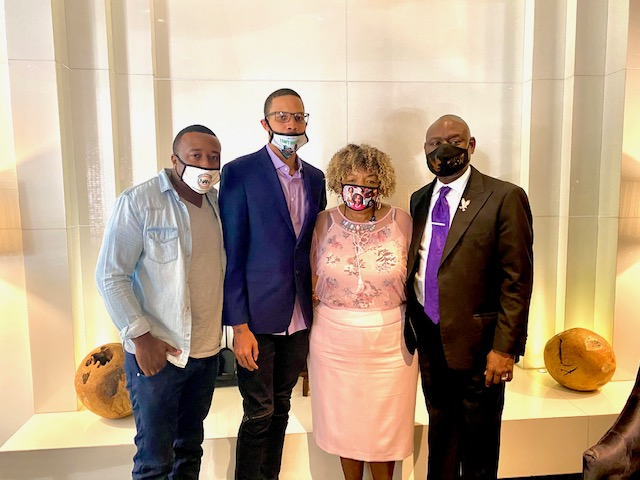
Dateline NBC Journey for Justice interview with Lester Holt in 2020

Dateline NBC (also known simply as Dateline) is a weekly American television news magazine reality legal show that is broadcast on NBC and Telemundo. Created in 1992, it was initially the network's flagship general interest news magazine, but evolved to focus mainly on true crime stories with only occasional episodes that focus on other topics. The program airs Fridays at 10:00 p.m. Eastern Time (9:00 p.m. Eastern for special two-hour editions). Special weekend encore editions also air at 9:00 p.m. or 10:00 p.m. (two-hour editions at 7:00 p.m. and 8:00 p.m. depending on the night). One or two-hour feature-length editions sometimes air on any given scheduled evening, often to fill vacancies in the primetime schedule on the program's respective nights due to program cancellations. In February 2021, the program aired its first ever docuseries, "The Widower", a five-hour true crime saga about a man who married six women, four of whom died.

== History ==
=== Early ===
NBC had tried for many years to create a newsmagazine similar to 60 Minutes and 20/20. Among the previous attempts: First Tuesday (1969–1971; 1973), Chronolog (1971–1972), NBC News Presents a Special Edition (1973–1974), Weekend (1974–1979), Prime Time Sunday (1979–1980), Prime Time Saturday (1980), NBC Magazine with David Brinkley (1980–1981), NBC Magazine (1981–1982), Monitor (1983), First Camera (1983–1984), Summer Sunday, USA (1984), American Almanac (1985–1986), 1986 (1986), Yesterday, Today and Tomorrow (1989), Real Life with Jane Pauley (1990–1991), and Exposé with Tom Brokaw (1991). Each of these earlier shows ended ignominiously, often in the same year, or even the month they premiered, and were barely promoted, much less needed, during NBC's ratings domination of entertainment programming in the 1980s.

Dateline NBC debuted on March 31, 1992, initially airing only on Tuesdays, with Jane Pauley and Stone Phillips serving as its co-anchors. Tom Brokaw and Katie Couric joined the program when the previously separate newsmagazine Now with Tom Brokaw and Katie Couric was converted into Dateline Wednesday. Gradually, the program expanded with the addition of a third night (on Friday) in 1994 and a fourth night (on Monday) in 1997, peaking at five nights a week with Sundays in mid-1999 and 2000. The number of nights that the program aired began to be reduced due to viewer exhaustion and the rise of equally economic and popular reality television programming. Editions first began to be removed in the spring of 2001, with the main Tuesday slot being eliminated in 2004.

Dateline was the first "multi-night" franchise that "established brand power by 'stripping' editions," a strategy by NBC's entertainment division to place the program in the same time slot every week. It was considered to be a singular program rather than multiple weekly programs, and included many teasers and multiple installment interviews (NBC later tried a similar strategy of "stripping" with The Jay Leno Show in 2009). In its prime, from 1995 to 1999, Dateline provided significant breaking news coverage. The program featured sensationalized news stories and drew in viewers with stories aired in multiple installments. By 1999, any one individual Dateline edition placed in Nielsen's top 10 most-watched television programs among total viewers during most weeks. NBC capitalized on its relationship with CNBC and MSNBC by airing repackaged stories seen on past Dateline broadcasts on the retrospective series Headliners and Legends and Time and Again.

The program first originated from NBC Studio 3K, using the same set that was used at the time for NBC Nightly News. When Today moved to its current facility, NBC Studio 1A, in 1994, Dateline took over Studio 3B and received its own brand-new dedicated set.

Past contributing anchors were Bryant Gumbel, who left NBC in 1997, Maria Shriver, who left NBC in 2004, and Katie Couric, who left NBC in 2006. On June 24, 2005, Ann Curry co-anchored "Dateline" for the first time and became permanent host shortly thereafter.

Dateline began broadcasting in high definition for the first time on July 21, 2008, with an episode titled "Tower Dogs". Dateline previously shared the multi-level Studio 1A with Today. However, in 2013, the program moved back to Studio 3K, where the early-morning news programs Early Today and MSNBC's Morning Joe First Look are also broadcast. Lester Holt replaced Ann Curry as host of Dateline with the start of the 20th season on September 23, 2011, shortly after Curry became permanent co-host of Today.

=== General Motors vs. NBC ===
On November 17, 1992, Dateline NBC aired an hour-long investigative report titled "Waiting to Explode," which focused on allegations that General Motors' Rounded-Line Chevrolet C/K-Series pickup trucks exploded upon impact when involved in collisions due to the poor design of the vehicle model's fuel tanks. Dateline's footage showed a sample of a low-speed accident in which the fuel tank exploded; the explosion during the crash test would later be discovered to have been staged by an expert witness for hire against GM, Bruce Enz of The Institute for Safety Analysis. Enz used incendiary devices and a poorly fitted gas cap to create the impression of a dangerous vehicle. The program did not disclose the fact that the accident was staged.

GM hired investigators from Failure Analysis Associates (FaAA, now Exponent) to study the footage; FaAA investigators discovered while reviewing the video that smoke had actually started to expel from the fuel tank six frames before the actual impact occurred. Acting on a tip from someone involved with the Dateline crash test, investigators with FaAA searched through 22 junkyards in Indiana before finding the charred wreckage of the GM pickups.

It was also later revealed that the Dateline report had been dishonest about the fuel tanks rupturing and the alleged 30 miles per hour (48 km/h) speed at which the collision was conducted. The actual speed was found to be higher than stated, around 40 miles per hour (64 km/h), and after x-ray examination of the fuel tanks from the C/K pickups used in the televised collision, it was found that they had not ruptured and were intact. GM subsequently filed an anti-defamation/libel lawsuit against NBC after conducting an extensive investigation. On February 8, 1993, after announcing the lawsuit, GM conducted a highly publicized point-by-point rebuttal in the Product Exhibit Hall of the General Motors Building in Detroit that lasted nearly two hours.

The General Motors lawsuit and the subsequent settlement were arguably the most devastating blows for NBC in a series of reputation damaging incidents during the 1990s and early 2000s. Within NBC, Michael Gartner, who resigned under pressure shortly after the incident, was the source for much of the blame. NBC News President Reuven Frank stated Gartner was hired in 1988, despite having no background in television news, in an attempt to satisfy parent company General Electric, by replacing current journalists with cheaper, less experienced reporters and producers.

In addition to the resignation of the news division's president Gartner, three Dateline NBC producers were dismissed as a result of the incident and the findings of the resulting investigation: executive producer Jeff Diamond, senior producer David Rummel, and Robert Read, producer of the report on the pickups. Michele Gillen, the correspondent involved in the segment, was transferred to NBC's Miami owned-and-operated station WTVJ, where she became an anchor of the station's evening newscasts.

=== Michelle Madigan ===
In August 2007, Dateline reporter Michelle Madigan attempted to secretly record hackers admitting to crimes at that year's DEF CON in Las Vegas, Nevada. After being outed by DEF CON founder Jeff Moss during an assembly, she was heckled and chased out of the conference by attendees for her use of covert audio and video recording equipment. DEF CON staff tried to get Madigan to obtain a press pass before the outing happened. A DEF CON source at NBC News had tipped off organizers to Madigan's plans.

== Special series ==
=== To Catch a Predator ===
To Catch a Predator was a special series of reports, hosted by Chris Hansen, featuring hidden camera sting operations that bust potential sex offenders who carry out online chats with children with the intent of luring them to meet in person and engage in illegal sexual activity. The stings are conducted in partnership with Perverted-Justice, and begin for each potential offender with recordings of online chats of him with a "decoy" employed with the organization, posing as minor, generally between the ages of 12 and 15. If the potential offender and the decoy make an appointment, this is at the pretended home of the pretended minor, which is in fact a house prepared for the television show, with police hiding outside for the subsequent arrest of the offender outside the house.

During the filming of each episode, men who attempt to meet the minor in person are filmed as they enter inside the "sting" house. Shortly after the target is inside, often after talking to the Perverted-Justice decoy (who either briefly meets with the men or converses with them from another room), Hansen would confront each suspect and ask them about their online conversations (which were transcribed and printed) with the decoy. After the confrontation, the men are taken into custody by local police. Some men were arrested even if they never entered the home in question. The segment was cancelled in early 2008 in part due to criticism of the show as well as legal issues, including the Suicide of Bill Conradt and subsequent prosecution of NBC by Conradt's sister, Patricia Conradt.

=== “Wild Wild Web” ===
“Wild Wild Web” was a limited Dateline series in which host Chris Hansen would go undercover to reply to illegal or unethical online advertisements. With hidden cameras rolling, Hansen and his producers met with a hitman, people selling body parts, and sweetheart swindles.

=== To Catch a Con Man ===
To Catch a Con Man was a series of hidden camera investigations devoted to the subject of identifying and detaining con men who attempted to extract money from victims in advance fee fraud scams, although some editions also focused on exposing and catching identity thieves. The stories, which were also reported by Chris Hansen (who called the identity thieves that the series investigates "a different kind of predator"), were conducted as an undercover sting operation in partnership with cardcops.com, a credit card watchdog group which investigates identity thefts and aims to catch the suspects in the act.

=== The Real Blacklist ===
Richard Engel hosted a tie-in version leading into The Blacklist about significant crimes and conspiracies.

=== The Widower ===
The Widower is Dateline's first ever docuseries. The Widower takes viewers behind the scenes of a decade-long investigation into Thomas Randolph, an eccentric Las Vegas man accused of killing his wife Sharon. With hundreds of hours of exclusive footage, Dateline NBC veteran producer Dan Slepian captures the confounding murder investigation that soon reveals Sharon was Randolph's sixth wife - and the fourth to die under mysterious circumstances.

=== Dateline: The Last Day ===
A spin-off series, Dateline: The Last Day premiered on June 14, 2022 on Peacock.

== Comparison with other news magazines ==
Dateline focuses on true crime and human interest stories, predominantly featuring a single story for the entire program. Keith Morrison often serves as narrator for certain editions, usually reporting on real-life murder mysteries chronicled in many editions, and cliffhangers are used prior to commercial breaks. Con man Steve Comisar appeared regularly on Dateline as a fraud prevention expert.

The Friday night edition of Dateline features special emphasis on true crime stories, which previously included the "To Catch a Predator" series. Most NBC News specials, either in the form of special interviews or extended special reports on pertinent breaking news stories that occurred earlier in the day, are also broadcast under the Dateline banner. However, on occasion, the Sunday broadcasts (airing in a time slot otherwise reserved for family-friendly programming, aside from CBS' competitor 60 Minutes) focuses on stories tailored for younger viewers, such as recent Sunday reports on teen drivers and child safety; on other weeks, the Sunday editions feature either true crime stories, stories recounting situations in which people have survived life-threatening situations, consumer reports or interviews.

Dateline features a single story format, although in the past the program maintained a traditional newsmagazine format with multiple segments of varying length, such as with the Sunday version, which in particular still occasionally features multiple story packages that are tied to a specific theme. Unlike the other flagship newsmagazines on U.S. television (CBS' 60 Minutes and ABC's 20/20), Dateline featured more character-driven stories focusing on the audience's emotional attachment to the persons featured, and fewer non-character driven international and national news stories. However, the success of Dateline led to the other networks to create additional versions of their newsmagazines, 60 Minutes II and additional nights of 20/20 (which were often not as successful).

Executive producer Neal Shapiro pioneered several "signature segments" that appeared regularly on the program. These included Dateline: Survivor, in which a person recounts a near-death experience and their eventual rescue; Dateline Timeline, in which a popular product, person and music single are shown/played that viewers are invited to guess what year it was from; State of the Art, explaining how a special effect or stunt in a movie was technically accomplished; Consumer Alert, in which common consumer complaints or issues (such as food safety and products of suspect quality that may be dangerous) are investigated, Dateline Hidden Camera Investigation, a story using hidden cameras to focus on an issue of public concern; and Newsmakers, light interviews with major figures in politics, entertainment, and business, as well as regular people in the news. The program also included cross-promotional segments with Court TV and magazines People, Good Housekeeping and Consumer Reports. In the 1990s, a common week would feature several "signature segments," breaking news, updates on past stories shown on the program, multi-part investigations, and interviews. Dateline also pioneered the use of viewer feedback including telephone polling and a unique format, the "Interactive Dateline Mystery," where viewers voted (similar to Choose Your Own Adventure) on where the story should go next.

In 2019, taking advantage of the recent popularity of true crime podcasts such as Serial, and as part of a larger push into the medium by the division, NBC News launched a Dateline podcast; the podcast launched with the seven-episode story 13 Alibis. Dateline producers stated that the podcast stories would be able to go more in-depth on topics than the television series, and did not rule out other types of content—including audio-only versions of stories from its archives, as well as extensions and updates to stories from the television series. In August 2022, when the podcast launched a premium subscription on Apple Podcasts, the Dateline podcast had 775 million downloads, and was ranked as the sixth-largest podcast in the U.S. by Podtrac.

== Staff ==
The cast of Dateline in 2026

=== Current executive leadership ===
- Liz Cole (2024–present) (senior executive producer) – Cole has been working on Dateline at some level since 1993. By 2011, Cole had become executive producer. In 2020, Cole became the first president of the newly-formed NBC News Studios. In 2022, Cole also became president of NBC News Audio. In 2024, Cole became senior executive producer of Dateline.
- Paul Ryan (executive producer)

=== Current on-air staff ===
Anchor

- Lester Holt (September 23, 2011–present)

Contributing anchor

- Craig Melvin (2016–present) (syndicated edition anchor)
- Julio Vaqueiro (2025–present) (Telemundo edition anchor)

Correspondents

- Blayne Alexander (2023–present)
- Andrea Canning (2012–present)
- Josh Mankiewicz (1995–present)
- Keith Morrison (1995–present)
- Dennis Murphy (1994–present)

=== Former on-air staff ===
Former anchors

- Jane Pauley (March 31, 1992 – May 13, 2003)
- Stone Phillips (March 31, 1992 – July 2, 2007)
- Tom Brokaw (1994–2004)
- Katie Couric (1994–2006)
- Natalie Morales (2004–2021)
- Ann Curry (June 24, 2005 – September 16, 2011)
- Meredith Vieira (2006–2012)
- Matt Lauer (1997–2017) (contributing anchor)

Former correspondents

- Maria Shriver (1992–2004, 2013–2015)
- Deborah Roberts (1992–1995)
- Chris Hansen (1993–2013)
- Elizabeth Vargas (1993–1996)
- Brian Williams (1996–2015)
- Rob Stafford (1996–2006)
- Mike Taibbi (1997–2014)
- Hoda Kotb (1998–2008)
- Norah O'Donnell (1999–2011)
- Martin Bashir (2010–2014)
- Erica Hill (2013–2016)
- Megyn Kelly (2017–2018)
- Jeff Rossen (2012–2019)

== Syndication ==
Repackaged hour-long true crime episodes of Dateline air on various cable and satellite channels such as Investigation Discovery, E!, USA Network and OWN, usually with the network names suffixing the generic branding of Dateline on.... Several other brandings exist, with Dateline: Secrets Uncovered as a part of Oxygen, Dateline: Real Life Mysteries on TLC (along with Dateline on TLC), and Dateline Extra the branding for repackaged episodes on MSNBC, also owned by NBCUniversal. All episodes are repackaged by NBC News under its non-fiction Peacock Productions banner. The NBCUniversal streaming service Peacock has featured a full-time streaming channel made up of Dateline episodes since its July 2020 launch. NBC News' streaming channel, NBC News Now, also airs episodes of Dateline NBC every weekend.

On September 25, 2017, Dateline began airing archived true crime-focused episodes in daily broadcast syndication; the NBC branding was completely removed. These episodes also air as part of MyNetworkTV's lineups.

In February 2025, NBC News announced that it would begin to produce a Spanish-language version of the series for sister network Telemundo; it will be presented by Noticias Telemundo anchor Julio Vaqueiro.

=== International broadcasts ===
Dateline is broadcast in Canada, mainly through NBC and MyNetworkTV affiliates from U.S. border cities (such as KING-TV and KZJO in Seattle, WDIV-TV and WADL in Detroit, and WGRZ-TV and WNYO-TV in Buffalo, New York) that are widely available in that country; until the fall of 2022, new editions of the show were not simulcast on a Canadian network nationwide, though many of the same Canadian counterparts to the cable networks mentioned in the syndication section air the repackaged Dateline on... episodes as a part of their own schedules (especially those containing domestic stories), and some other American stations airing in Canada carry the Dateline syndicated package outside of network hours. Since the fall of 2022, Citytv simultaneously airs new episodes of Dateline with NBC in Canada (with domestic advertising), a rarity as Canadian networks do not generally simulcast American newsmagazines. Since January 2025, the syndicated version of Dateline also airs on the newly launched channel Oxygen Canada from Bell Media.

Dateline NBC is also seen on the 24-hour news network Orbit News in Europe and the Middle East, which broadcasts MSNBC and other NBC News programs for several hours a day. It is also broadcast on the Seven Network in Australia on Sundays at 5 a.m., although is pre-empted by paid programming on regional affiliates Prime Television and Golden West Network. In the Philippines, the program airs on TAP Edge.

== Nielsen ratings ==
- Series debut: 12.9 household rating/17.1 million viewers
- Series high: 21.2 million viewers (10/4/1994)

Season averages

NOTE: Data from 2007 to present includes Live+ Ratings.

Season	Nielsen ranking	Average viewership
2005–06		10.720 (Friday)
2006–07		no data available
2007–08		no data available
2008–09		no data available
2009–10		no data available
2010–11		4.916 (Sunday); 6.117 (Friday)
2011–12		5.097 (Sunday); 5.148 (Friday)
2012–13		5.913 (Sunday); 5.572 (Wednesday); 5.429 (Friday)
2013–14		no data available

== See also ==
- 20/20 (American TV program)
- 48 Hours (TV program)
