= NBC News Studios =

Documentary division of NBC News

- Type: Division
- Industry: Television production
- Founded: January 23, 2020; 6 years ago
- Headquarters: New York City, United States
- Key people: Liz Cole (president)
- Parent: NBC News
- Website: nbcnewsstudios.com

NBC News Studios is the documentary and scripted production arm of NBC News. It produces non-scripted, documentary-related, and select scripted programmes for NBCUniversal's broadcast networks and streaming service Peacock.

== History ==
In January 2020, NBC News shuttered down its previous non-fiction documentary unit Peacock Productions. Later that same month, NBC News returned to the documentary business by launching NBC News Studios, its own in-house production studio division. The new division is led by Dateline NBC executive producer Liz Cole.

== Filmography ==
=== Television ===
Title	Years	Network	Notes
John Wayne Gacy: Devil in Disguise	2021	Peacock	co-production with Witchcraft Motion Picture Company
The Thing About Pam	2022	NBC	co-production with Blumhouse Television, Weird Egg Productions and Big Picture Co.
The Hillside Strangler: Devil in Disguise	2022	Peacock	
Model America	2022	MSNBC	co-production with Anchor Entertainment and Psycho Films
Leguizamo Does America	2023–present	MSNBC	
Black Pop: Celebrating the Power of Black Culture	2023	E!	co-production with Unanimous Media
Pathological: The Lies of Joran van der Sloot	2024	Peacock	
A Great Day with J Balvin	2024	Peacock	co-production with Exile Productions and Ma G Nation
The Sing Sing Chronicles	2024	MSNBC	co-production with MSNBC Films and Trilogy Films
Survival Mode	2025–present	NBC	
Devil in Disguise: John Wayne Gacy	2025	Peacock	A drama adaptation of the docuseries series John Wayne Gacy: Devil in Disguise co-production with Universal Content Productions and Littleton Road Productions

=== Films ===
Title	Release date	Distributor	Notes
Memory Box: Echoes of 9/11	September 8, 2021	MSNBC Films	Premiered at the 2021 Toronto International Film Festival
The Disappearance of Shere Hite	November 17, 2023	IFC Films; Sapan Pictures	co-production with Industrial Media, This Machine Filmworks and TeaTime Pictures
Every Body	June 30, 2023	Focus Features	
The Disappearance of Shere Hite	November 17, 2023	IFC Films; Sapan Pictures	co-production with Industrial Media, This Machine Filmworks and TeaTime Pictures
Separated	October 4, 2024	MSNBC Films	co-production with Participant, Fourth Floor and Moxie Pictures
