= Black Reel Award for Outstanding Documentary =

Motion picture award for documentary

Black Reel Award for Outstanding Documentary Feature
- Country: United States
- Presented by: The Black Reel Awards (BRAs)
- First award: Black Reel Awards of 2010
- Most recent winner: Ahmir "Questlove" Thompson; Summer of Soul (Black Reel Awards of 2022)
- Website: blackreelawards.com

This article lists the winners and nominees for the Black Reel Award for Outstanding Documentary. This award is given to the directors and was first awarded during the 2010 ceremony.

== Winners and nominees ==
Winners are listed first and highlighted in bold.

=== 2010s ===
| Year | Film | Director | Ref |
|---|---|---|---|
2010
| 2010 | **Good Hair** | **Jeff Stilson** | |
| 2010 | Michael Jackson's This Is It | Kenny Ortega | |
| 2010 | More than a Game | Kristopher Belman | |
| 2010 | Passing Strange | Spike Lee | |
| 2010 | Tyson | James Toback | |
2011
| 2011 | **Waiting for "Superman"** | **Lesley Chilcott** | |
| 2011 | The Lottery | Madeleine Sackler | |
| 2011 | Why We Laugh: Black Comedians on Black Comedy | Robert Townsend | |
| 2011 | My Mic Sounds Nice: The Truth About Women in Hip Hop | Ava DuVernay | |
2012
| 2012 | **Beats, Rhymes & Life: The Travels of A Tribe Called Quest** | **Michael Rapaport** | |
| 2012 | Being Elmo: A Puppeteer's Journey | Constance Marks | |
| 2012 | The Black Power Mixtape 1967-1975 | Göran Hugo Olsson | |
| 2012 | The Interrupters | Steve James | |
| 2012 | Undefeated | Daniel Lindsay and T. J. Martin | |
2013
| 2013 | **The Central Park Five** | **Ken Burns, Sarah Burns and David McMahon** | |
| 2013 | Bad 25 | Spike Lee | |
| 2013 | Brooklyn Castle | Katie Dallamaggiore | |
| 2013 | Marley | Kevin MacDonald | |
| 2013 | Searching for Sugar Man | Malik Bendjelloul | |
2014
| 2014 | **20 Feet from Stardom** | **Morgan Neville** | |
| 2014 | Free Angela and all Political Prisoners | Shola Lynch | |
| 2014 | God Loves Uganda | Roger Ross Williams | |
| 2014 | The Trials of Muhammad Ali | Bill Siegel | |
| 2014 | Venus and Serena | Maiken Baird and Michelle Major | |
2015
| 2015 | **Anita: Speaking Truth to the Power** | **Freida Lee Mock** | |
| 2015 | I Am Ali | Clare Lewins | |
| 2015 | Keep On Keepin' On | Alan Hicks | |
| 2015 | Nas: Time Is Illmatic | One9 | |
| 2015 | Virunga | Orlando von Einsiedel | |
2016
| 2016 | **What Happened, Miss Simone?** | **Liz Garbus** | |
| 2016 | A Ballerina's Tale | Nelson George | |
| 2016 | The Amazing Nina Simone | Jeff L. Lieberman | |
| 2016 | The Black Panthers: Vanguard of the Revolution | Stanley Nelson Jr. | |
| 2016 | Sweet Micky for President | Ben Patterson | |
2017
| 2017 | **13th** | **Ava DuVernay** | |
| 2017 | I Am Not Your Negro | Raoul Peck | |
| 2017 | Life, Animated | Roger Ross Williams | |
| 2017 | Miss Sharon Jones! | Barbara Kopple | |
| 2017 | O.J.: Made in America | Ezra Edelman | |
2018
| 2018 | **Step** | **Amanda Lipitz** | |
| 2018 | Chasing Trane: The John Coltrane Documentary | John Scheinfeld | |
| 2018 | Let It Fall: Los Angeles 1982–1992 | John Ridley | |
| 2018 | Strong Island | Yance Ford | |
| 2018 | Whose Streets? | Sabaah Folayan & Damon Davis | |
2019
| 2019 | **Quincy** | **Rashida Jones & Alan Hicks** | |
| 2019 | Amazing Grace | Sydney Pollack | |
| 2019 | Hale County This Morning, This Evening | RaMell Ross | |
| 2019 | Minding the Gap | Bing Liu | |
| 2019 | Whitney | Kevin Macdonald | |

=== 2020s ===
| Year | Film | Director | Ref |
|---|---|---|---|
2020
| 2020 | **The Black Godfather** | **Reginald Hudlin** | |
| 2020 | The Apollo | Roger Ross Williams | |
| 2020 | Knock Down the House | Rachel Lears | |
| 2020 | Miles Davis: Birth of the Cool | Stanley Nelson Jr. | |
| 2020 | Toni Morrison: The Pieces I Am | Timothy Greenfield-Sanders | |
2021
| 2021 | **Time** | **Garrett Bradley** | |
| 2021 | All In: The Fight for Democracy | Liz Garbus & Lisa Cortes | |
| 2021 | John Lewis: Good Trouble | Dawn Porter | |
| 2021 | MLK/FBI | Sam Pollard | |
| 2021 | The Way I See It | Dawn Porter | |
2022
| 2022 | Ailey | Jamila Wingot | |
| 2022 | Citizen Ashe | Rex Miller & Sam Pollard | |
| 2022 | My Name is Pauli Murray | Betsy West & Julie Cohen | |
| 2022 | Rita Moreno: Just a Girl Who Decided to Go for It | Mariem Perez Riera | |
| 2022 | **Summer of Soul** | **Ahmir "Questlove" Thompson** | |

== Multiple nominations and wins ==
=== Multiple nominations ===
3 Nominations

- Stanley Nelson
- Roger Ross Williams

2 Nominations

- Ava DuVernay
- Liz Garbus
- Alan Hicks
- Spike Lee
- Kevin Macdonald
- Sam Pollard
- Dawn Porter
