= 18th Annual Black Reel Awards =

Film-industry awards in 2018

18th Black Reel Awards
- Date: February 23, 2018
- Location: Washington, D.C.

The 18th Annual Black Reel Awards ceremony, presented by the Foundation for the Augmentation of African-Americans in Film (FAAAF) and honoring the best films of 2017, took place on February 23, 2018, at 8:00 p.m. EST (5:00 p.m. PST). During the ceremony, FAAAF presented the Black Reel Awards in 21 categories.

The television film categories were moved and presented at the Black Reel Awards for Television.

Get Out led all films with 12 nominations.

== Winners and nominees ==
Winners are highlighted in bold.

Best Film	Best Director
**Get Out**; Detroit; Girls Trip; Marshall; Mudbound	**Jordan Peele – Get Out**; Maggie Betts – Novitiate; Reginald Hudlin – Marshall; Malcolm D. Lee – Girls Trip; Dee Rees – Mudbound
Best Actor	Best Actress
**Daniel Kaluuya – Get Out**; Chadwick Boseman – Marshall; Algee Smith – Detroit; Keith Stanfield – Crown Heights; Denzel Washington – Roman J. Israel, Esq.	**Natalie Paul – Crown Heights**; Simone Baker– Gook; Carmen Ejogo – It Comes at Night; Amandla Stenberg – Everything, Everything; Jessica Williams – The Incredible Jessica James
Best Supporting Actor	Best Supporting Actress
**Jason Mitchell – Mudbound**; Idris Elba – Molly's Game; Laurence Fishburne – Last Flag Flying; Jamie Foxx – Baby Driver; Lil Rel Howery – Get Out	**Tiffany Haddish – Girls Trip**; Mary J. Blige – Mudbound; Betty Gabriel – Get Out; Octavia Spencer – The Shape of Water; Tessa Thompson – Thor: Ragnarok
Best Breakthrough Performance, Male	Best Breakthrough Performance, Female
**Daniel Kaluuya – Get Out**; Nnamdi Asomugha – Crown Heights; Sterling K. Brown – Marshall; J. Quinton Johnson – Last Flag Flying; Lil Rel Howery – Get Out	**Tiffany Haddish – Girls Trip**; Mary J. Blige – Mudbound; Betty Gabriel – Get Out; Natalie Paul – Crown Heights; Jessica Williams – The Incredible Jessica James
Best Ensemble	Best Screenplay, Adapted or Original
**Billy Hopkins & Ashley Ingram – Mudbound**; Victoria Thomas – Detroit; Terri Taylor – Get Out; Mary Vernieu & Michelle Wade Byrd – Girls Trip; Victoria Thomas – Marshall	**Jordan Peele – Get Out**; Gerald McMurray and Christine T. Berg – Burning Sands; Kenya Barris and Tracy Oliver – Girls Trip; Dee Rees and Virgil Williams – Mudbound; Maggie Betts – Novitiate
Best Feature Documentary	Best Independent Feature
**Step – Amanda Lipitz**; Chasing Trane: The John Coltrane Documentary – John Scheinfeld; Let It Fall: Los Angeles 1982–1992 – John Ridley; Strong Island – Yance Ford; Whose Streets? – Sabaah Folayan and Damon Davis	**Crown Heights – Matt Ruskin**; Burning Sands – Gerald McMurray; Gook – Justin Chon; Imperial Dreams – Mailk Vitthal; The Incredible Jessica James – James C. Strouse
Best Independent Short	Best Independent Documentary
**Oscar Micheaux – JD Walker**; 90 Days – Jennia Fredrique & Nathan Hale Williams; Amelia's Closet – Halima Lucas; GEMA – Kenrick Prince; See You Yesterday – Stefon Bristol	**Tell Them We Are Rising: The Story of Black Colleges and Universities – Stanley Nelson Jr.**; Back to Natural: A Documentary Film – Gillian Scott-Ward; Quest – Jonathan Olshefski; Yemanja: Wisdom From the African Heart of Brazil – Donna Roberts & Donna Reed; Zo! Making of Skybreak! – Donnie Seales Jr.
Best Foreign Film	World Cinema Motion Picture
**The Wound (South Africa) – John Trengove**; Félicité (France) – Alain Gomis; Kati Kati (Kenya) – Mbithi Masya	**A United Kingdom – Amma Asante**; Brown Girl Begins – Sharon Lewis; Cargo – Kareem Mortimer
Best Emerging Filmmaker	Best First Screenplay
**Jordan Peele – Get Out**; Maggie Betts – Novitiate; Damon Davis and Sabaah Folayan – Whose Streets?; J. D. Dillard – Sleight; Mailk Vithhal – Imperial Dreams	**Maggie Betts – Novitiate**; Gerald McMurray & Christine T. Berg – Burning Sands; Malik Vitthal & Ismet Prcic – Imperial Dreams; J. D. Dillard & Alex Theurer – Sleight; Caroline Jules – TOURMENT d’AMOUR
Best Original or Adapted Song	Outstanding Original Score
**"Mighty River (song)" from Mudbound – Mary J. Blige**; "Best of Me" from La Vie Magnifique de Charlie – Kortnee Price; "Jump" from Step – Cynthia Erivo; "Stand Up for Something" from Marshall – Common and Andra Day; "Sarlight" from Zo! Making of Skybreak! – Zo! and Phonte	**Michael Abels – Get Out**; James Newton Howard – Detroit; David Newman – Girls Trip; Roger Suen – Gook; Marcus Miller – Marshall
Best Voice Performance
**Vin Diesel – Guardians of the Galaxy Vol. 2**; Kevin Hart – Captain Underpants: The First Epic Movie; Jenifer Lewis – Cars 3; Maya Rudolph – The Emoji Movie; Maya Rudolph – The Nut Job 2: Nutty by Nature
