= Henny Garfunkel =

American photographer

Henny Garfunkel (born April 17, 1947) is an American street and portrait photographer based in New York City. Since 1993, Garfunkel has been photographing at major film festivals including Cannes, Toronto and Sundance Film Festival where she was branded its "reigning queen." She is known for her portraits of actors and directors.

== Photography ==
Garfunkel's photographs have been published in The New York Times, Entertainment Weekly, BBC, and Vogue. Her work has been exhibited across the United States and internationally, including at the Museum of Modern Art in New York, ARKA Contemporary Art Gallery in Russia, and the Festival Internacional de Fotografía de Castilla y León in Spain.

She was the set photographer for many films including John Waters' Hairspray (1988 film) and Cry-Baby (1990), Todd Solondz's Happiness (1998 film), Amy J. Berg's This is Personal, and Dawn Porter (filmmaker)'s John Lewis: Good Trouble.

== Awards ==
Garfunkel was awarded the First Place prize at the Miami Street Photography Festival in 2018 for her series “Fabulous Ladies of Miami Beach”
