= Lienemann =

Lienemann is a surname. Notable people with the surname include:

- David Lienemann (born 1982/83, American photographer
- Klaus Lienemann (1947 – 2021), German footballer
- Manfred Lienemann (born 1946), German footballer and manager
- Marie-Noëlle Lienemann (born 1951), French politician
- Timo Lienemann (born 1985), German racing driver
