= Luther: Never Too Much =

- Directed by: Dawn Porter
- Written by: Dawn Porter
- Produced by: Trish D Chetty; Ged Doherty; Jamie Foxx; Datari Turner; Leah Smith
- Starring: Jamie Foxx; Mariah Carey; Luther Vandross
- Cinematography: Bryan Gentry
- Edited by: Mark Fason
- Music by: Robert Glasper
- Production companies: Raindog Films The Blue Moon Company; Foxxhole Productions; Trilogy Films; Sony Music Publishing; Sony Music Entertainment
- Distributed by: Giant Pictures; CNN Films; Oprah Winfrey Network
- Release dates: January 21, 2024 (Sundance); 2025 (United States)
- Running time: 101 minutes
- Country: United States
- Language: English
- Box office: $202,796

Luther: Never Too Much is a 2024 American documentary film written and directed by Dawn Porter, who also serves as an executive producer. It chronicles the life and career of R&B icon Luther Vandross, who died in 2005. The film premiered at the 2024 Sundance Film Festival on January 21, 2024 and received positive critical reception, winning two NAACP Image Awards and the Black Reel Award for Outstanding Documentary.

== Synopsis ==
The film follows Luther Vandross' nearly 40 years in the entertainment industry and highlights his career highs as well as battles with negative media attention focused on his weight and sexuality. Footage from his performances and archived interviews, as well as interviews with his associates are included. The film's subtitle is taken from one of Vandross' best known songs. It includes interviews with Dionne Warwick, Mariah Carey, Jamie Foxx, Richard Marx, Nile Rodgers, Marcus Miller, and others.

== Production ==
Trish D Chetty and Ged Doherty began developing a film focused on Luther Vandross in 2018 through Raindog Films. Director Dawn Porter's production company Trilogy Films joined in 2022. Raindog Films acquired the rights to produce from Vandross' estate. The score was composed by Robert Glasper. Jamie Foxx, Datari Turner, Phil Thornton and Jon Platt are executive producers.

== Release ==
Luther: Never Too Much premiered at the Sundance Film Festival on January 21, 2024. In May 2024, CNN Films and the Oprah Winfrey Network acquired the SVOD distribution rights to the documentary, planning to air it on CNN, OWN and Max in 2025. In August 2024, Giant Pictures and Sony Music Vision announced a plan to distribute the film theatrically that fall.

== Reception ==
On the review aggregator website Rotten Tomatoes, 98% of 40 critics' reviews are positive, with an average rating of 7.5/10. The website's consensus reads: "Blessed with a lovable music genius as its subject, Never Too Much tells Luther Vandross' story straight with a soundtrack that'll send audiences out on a high." Valerie Complex praised director Dawn Porter in a Deadline review, writing, "Porter constructs a portrait that strikes a delicate, graceful balance... For audiences lacking familiarity, Porter makes a case to appreciate Vandross’ contributions to music, and to culture. And for longtime fans, she has crafted an ode befitting our nostalgia while challenging any and all assumptions." Variety writer Todd Gilchrist complimented the inclusion of Vandross's music in Luther: "Porter skillfully emphasizes just how much material he left behind, and offers generous enough snippets of it that her film feels simultaneously like biography and a musical anthology, a primer and invitation to explore him further." In The Hollywood Reporter, Lovia Gyarke deemed the film "essential viewing".

== Awards and nominations ==
- 2024 – Winner, Sarasota Film Festival, Industry Audience Award
- 2025 – Winner, NAACP Image Awards, Outstanding Documentary (Film) (for Sony Music Entertainment/Sony Music Publishing/CNN Films)
- 2025 – Winner, NAACP Image Awards, Outstanding Directing in a Documentary (Television or Motion Picture) (for Dawn Porter)
- 2025 – Winner, Black Reel Awards, Outstanding Documentary (for Dawn Porter)
- 2025 – Nominated, Black Reel Awards, Outstanding Cinematography (for Bryan Gentry)
