= Deadlocked: How America Shaped the Supreme Court =

- Genre: Documentary
- Based on: The Supermajority: How the Supreme Court Divided America by Michael Waldman
- Directed by: Dawn Porter
- Music by: Paul Brill
- Country of origin: United States
- Original language: English
- No. of episodes: 4

Production
- Executive producers: Dawn Porter; Eli Holzman; Aaron Saidman; Vinnie Malholtra
- Producers: Lauren Capps; Lucy Kennedy; Summer Damon
- Production companies: Trilogy Films; Showtime Documentary Films; Showtime Networks

Original release
- Network: Showtime
- Release: September 22 – October 13, 2023

Deadlocked: How America Shaped the Supreme Court is an American documentary miniseries directed and produced by Dawn Porter. Loosely based on the nonfiction book The Supermajority: How the Supreme Court Divided America by Michael Waldman. It explores the modern history, people, decisions and conformations of the Supreme Court of the United States. It premiered on September 22, 2023, on Showtime.

== Premise ==
Explores the modern history, people, decisions, and confirmations of the Supreme Court of the United States.

== Episodes ==
| No. | Title | Directed by | Original release date | U.S. viewers (millions) |
|---|---|---|---|---|
| 1 | "The Hearts of Men Can Be Changed" | Dawn Porter | September 22, 2023 | N/A |
| 2 | "A Conservative Revolution" | Dawn Porter | September 29, 2023 | N/A |
| 3 | "The Rule of Five" | Dawn Porter | October 6, 2023 | N/A |
| 4 | "Crisis of Legitimacy" | Dawn Porter | October 13, 2023 | N/A |

== Production ==
Showtime Documentary Films asked if Dawn Porter would be interested in making a project revolving around the Supreme Court, to which Porter agreed. Initially, titled Confirmed, the project primarily focusing on how justices are confirmed, however, once the court began making conservative decisions, it was expanded to show how the court became political. Porter wanted the series to make people understand what is happening and how we got here. Over several thousand pieces of archive were looked over to construct the series. Porter reached out to justices for comment, but all declined to participate. News of gifts from wealthy donors to Clarence Thomas and Samuel Alito does not appear in the series, as the news came once the series was completed.

In June 2022, it was announced Porter would direct and executive produce a documentary series revolving around the Supreme Court of the United States for Showtime.

== Release ==
The series first episode premiered at DC/Dox on June 18, 2023. It premiered on September 22, 2023, on Showtime.

== Reception ==
On the review aggregator website Rotten Tomatoes, 100% of 5 critics' reviews are positive, with an average rating of 7.6/10.
