= Rise Again: Tulsa and the Red Summer =

2021 documentary film by Dawn Porter

- Directed by: Dawn Porter
- Starring: DeNeen Brown
- Music by: Paul Brill
- Original language: English

Production
- Producer: Dawn Porter
- Editor: Dave Marcus

Original release
- Network: National Geographic
- Release: June 18, 2021

Rise Again: Tulsa and the Red Summer is a 2021 American documentary television film, directed and produced by Dawn Porter. It follows journalist DeNeen Brown who investigates the Tulsa race massacre in the search for mass graves, and new insights.

It was released on June 18, 2021, by National Geographic.

== Synopsis ==
Journalist DeNeen Brown investigates the Tulsa race massacre, searching for mass graves and new insights into the Red Summer.

== Production ==
In February 2021, it was announced Dawn Porter would direct and produce a documentary film revolving around the Tulsa race massacre, with National Geographic Documentary Films producing and distributing.

== Release ==
It was released on June 18, 2021, by National Geographic.

== Reception ==
=== Critical response ===
Rise Again: Tulsa and the Red Summer received positive reviews from film critics. It holds a 100% approval rating on review aggregator website Rotten Tomatoes, based on 10 reviews, with a weighted average of 8.00/10.

=== Accolades ===
Year	Award	Category	Nominee(s)	Result	Ref.
2022	Hollywood Critics Association TV Awards	Best Broadcast or Cable Documentary TV Movie	Rise Again: Tulsa and the Red Summer	Nominated	
