= Shade: A Tale of Two Presidents =

Book published by Pete Souza

- First edition
- Author: Pete Souza
- Language: English
- Genre: Biography
- Publisher: Little, Brown
- Publication date: 2018
- ISBN: 9780316421836

Shade: A Tale of Two Presidents is a book by photographer Pete Souza, published in 2018. The book juxtaposes pictures of American president Barack Obama with tweets from his successor Donald Trump.
