= Hair Like Mine =

2009 photograph of Barack Obama

Hair Like Mine (2009)

Hair Like Mine is a 2009 photograph by Pete Souza of a five-year-old child, Jacob Philadelphia, touching the head of Barack Obama, then president of the United States. Obama invited Philadelphia to touch his hair after the boy asked whether Obama's hair was similar to his own kinky hair. Time called the image "iconic", and it was later described by First Lady Michelle Obama as symbolizing progress made in the African-American struggle for civil rights.

== Context ==
The photograph was taken on May 8, 2009, in the Oval Office of the White House by Souza, who was the chief official White House photographer. Philadelphia's father, Carlton Philadelphia, had worked as a staff member of the United States National Security Council for two years. He was leaving the job and had been invited to bring his family to the Oval Office for a "departure photo" with Obama. Jacob Philadelphia quietly asked the president: "I want to know if your hair is like mine." Obama asked him to repeat the question, then replied, "Why don't you touch it and see for yourself?" and lowered his head. Souza's photograph captures the moment that Philadelphia touches Obama's head.

Souza later said that Jacob had said that "his friends had said his haircut was just like the president's and he wanted to see if it really was ... He asked the president if he could touch his head and the president bent over and he touched his head." Carlton Philadelphia's other son, Isaac, asked Obama about the cancellation of production of the F-22 Raptor fighter jet and was told that it was financially unviable. The questions were asked as the family was about to leave Obama; the boys' parents had not known what their children were going to ask him, and Souza himself was surprised at this moment. Souza's surprise is reflected in the composition of the photograph with Jacob Philadelphia's arm obscuring his face, the blurring of his brother Isaac, and in the heads of the boys' parents being cut off by the framing of the image.

Obama subsequently proffered his head to Edwin Caleb, a first grader in 2014 who remarked that he had short hair like his in a visit to Clarence Tinker Elementary School at MacDill Air Force Base.

== Impact ==
Michelle Obama, Obama's wife, later said the photograph was the only one that remained permanently on display at the White House, while other images were swapped in and out. Michelle felt that the image was symbolic of political progress in civil rights for African Americans. She told her audience, "I want you to think of that little Black boy in the Oval Office of the White House touching the head of the first Black President."

Julia M. Klein wrote in the Chicago Tribune that the photo reminds "us of the symbolic heft of this breakthrough presidency" as "cogently as photographs of Obama beside the Martin Luther King Jr. Memorial". Jackie Calmes, in The New York Times in 2012, described the popularity of the photo as "tangible evidence" that "Obama remains a potent symbol for blacks, with a deep reservoir of support." Obama's advisor David Axelrod had a framed image of the photograph in his office. Axelrod felt that the photograph showed that the "child could be thinking, 'Maybe I could be here someday'. This can be such a cynical business, and then there are moments like that that just remind you that it's worth it." Philadelphia's father told The New York Times in 2012 that "It's important for black children to see a black man as president. You can believe that any position is possible to achieve if you see a black person in it".

Time magazine described it as "the most iconic" of all Souza's images of Obama. Souza described the image in a 2017 interview as "kind of a grab shot" but that "it just tells you a lot about him as a person that he would not only be willing to bend down like that but have this little boy touch his head". Obama's interactions with children provided a welcome break from his working day according to Souza.

The photograph was included in Souza's 2017 book of photographs of Obama's presidency, Obama: An Intimate Portrait: The Historic Presidency in Photographs, published by Allen Lane.

In May 2022, Obama took to social media to congratulate Jacob Philadelphia on the occasion of his high school graduation, highlighting the importance of representation.

== See also ==
- African-American hair – Kinky hair types
- List of photographs considered the most important
- Natural hair movement – Movement for people of sub-Saharan African descent
