= Paul Brill =

American songwriter

- Born: United States
- Genre: Film score
- Occupations: Composer, songwriter, record producer

Paul Brill is an American composer, songwriter, and producer based in Brooklyn, New York. He is a three-time Emmy Award nominee who has scored feature films, television series and NPR Radio Themes, most notably: Joan Rivers: A Piece of Work, The Devil Came on Horseback, The Trials of Darryl Hunt, Freakonomics, Full Battle Rattle, Page One: Inside the New York Times, Better This World, and No Woman, No Cry, among others.

Brill scored the HBO film Burma Soldier, on which he collaborated with Rock legends U2 - composing a new string arrangement for an acoustic version of their classic song, "Walk On." He won the first-ever Best Music Award at the International Documentary Awards (IDA) for his score to "Better This World" and was nominated for a Golden Reel Award for his work on the hit Netflix docu-series, Bobby Kennedy for President.

== Career ==
He recently made his Off-Broadway debut, composing the score for Gabriel Jason Dean's Terminus, which featured stage legend Deirdre O'Connell and premiered to great acclaim at the New York Theatre Workshop, and his music was performed and featured by Phoenix Chamber Music Society in the Spring of 2018.

His additional notable work includes the Sundance Festival-winning films Gideon's Army, Trapped, and Love Free or Die, and the Emmy, DuPont and Peabody Award-winning, 6-hour PBS documentary, Many Rivers to Cross: The African Americans, with noted historian Henry Louis Gates and additional musical contributions from Wynton Marsalis. He scored Abigail Disney's directorial debut, the Emmy Award-winning The Armor of Light, Liz Garbus' Peabody Award-winning HBO documentary A Dangerous Son, and wrote the Theme and incidental music for the Peabody Award-winning NPR Podcast, Believed.

Brill also owns and operates a recording and production studio, Sterling Society Social Club, in Brooklyn, New York.

He is currently developing a new theatrical musical/libretto ballet/operetta/animated film based on his recent release, The Cost of Believing.

== Reviews ==
His recordings of original songwriting have been hailed as "stunning" by Paste magazine and "A testament to the enduring potency of classical pop songwriting," by Pitchfork Media. In addition to composing films and television specials for HBO, Showtime, History, A&E, National Geographic, SundanceTV and MTV, Brill is the ongoing composer for the popular A&E series The First 48, now in its 17th season. In 2001, he founded Scarlet Shame Records, a small record label that has released recordings by The Wingdale Community Singers, The Flying Change, Amber Rubarth and his own records.
