= Power of the Dream =

Power of the Dream is a 2024 documentary film which details WNBA player activism during their 2020 season. The film was directed by Dawn Porter.
