= Novitiate (film) =

2017 American drama film by Maggie Betts

- Theatrical release poster
- Directed by: Maggie Betts
- Written by: Maggie Betts
- Produced by: Carole Peterman; Celine Rattray; Trudie Styler
- Starring: Margaret Qualley; Julianne Nicholson; Dianna Agron; Morgan Saylor; Maddie Hasson; Liana Liberato; Melissa Leo
- Cinematography: Kat Westergaard
- Edited by: Susan E. Morse
- Music by: Christopher Stark
- Production companies: Maven Pictures; Novitiate Productions
- Distributed by: Sony Pictures Classics
- Release dates: January 20, 2017 (Sundance); October 27, 2017 (United States)
- Running time: 123 minutes
- Country: United States
- Language: English
- Box office: $580,346 (North America)

Novitiate is a 2017 American drama film written and directed by Maggie Betts in her feature directorial debut. Starring Margaret Qualley, Melissa Leo, Morgan Saylor, Dianna Agron, Julianne Nicholson, Liana Liberato, Denis O'Hare, and Maddie Hasson, the film follows a young woman (Qualley) who starts to question her faith as she trains to become a nun.

== Plot ==
Cathleen grows up in an unstable family in 1950s rural Tennessee; after attending a Catholic girls' school and watching her mother Nora's life fall apart, she becomes attracted to the Catholic faith and decides to join a convent when she is seventeen. At the Sisters of the Beloved Rose convent she is under the control of the Mother Superior, who is cold and traditional. She imposes strict punishments on the young postulants spending their first months at the convent; comparatively, the nun overseeing the postulants' direct education, Sister Mary Grace, is warm and progressive, allowing them frivolity. However, Cathleen chooses to spend free time studying the Bible rather than spend time with the other girls.

When the Catholic Church is transitioning to Vatican II in this period, Mother Superior ignores the letters from the Archbishop requesting the implementation of the more liberal practices; Sister Mary Grace finds the notice and challenges the Mother Superior, but is ignored and leaves the convent. Cathleen completes her tenure as a postulant and becomes a novice, taking her Simple Vows. Soon, though, she starts to feel sexual desire, and becomes more reclusive and stops eating as self-punishment. Nora visits to tell Cathleen of her father's death and notices that she looks ill; Nora threatens the Mother Superior, who tells her that Cathleen is devoted to God and no longer her daughter. Cathleen soon collapses from her malnutrition and ends up in the infirmary, finding a confidante in Sister Emanuel there; the two young nuns grow closer until they have a physical encounter. Cathleen's health improves.

The Archbishop has been informed that the Mother Superior is continuing with the traditional practices, and comes to the convent to force her to implement Vatican II. The Mother Superior becomes despondent and questions her relationship with God, becoming more passive and ambivalent toward the novices. At a chapter of faults, Cathleen confesses her desires, but does not name Sister Emanuel, who leaves the convent soon afterward. The Mother Superior finally accepts Vatican II, beginning a new era at the convent. Cathleen and her fellow nuns take their final vows with their families in attendance. When it is Cathleen's turn to answer what she wants, she hesitates, thinking about her answer.

The film ends with a note relating that after Vatican II a mass exodus of nuns occurred with 90,000 renouncing their vocation and leaving convents, a previously unseen scale of departure.

== Cast ==
- Margaret Qualley as Sister Cathleen Harris
  - Sasha Mason as Cathleen, age 12
  - Eliza Mason as Cathleen, age 7
- Melissa Leo as Reverend Mother Marie Saint-Clair
- Julianne Nicholson as Nora Harris
- Dianna Agron as Sister Mary Grace
- Rebecca Dayan as Sister Emanuel
- Morgan Saylor as Sister Evelyn
- Maddie Hasson as Sister Sissy
- Liana Liberato as Sister Emily
- Eline Powell as Sister Candace
- Chelsea Lopez as Sister Charlotte
- Denis O'Hare as Archbishop McCarthy
- Chris Zylka as Chuck Harris
- Ashley Bell as Sister Margaret
- Marco St. John as Father Luca
- Marshall Chapman as Sister Louisa

== Production ==
Novitiate is writer-director Maggie Betts's feature film directorial debut; her last projects were the 2010 documentary The Carrier, and the 2014 short Engram. In December 2015, it was announced that Melissa Leo, Dianna Agron, and Margaret Qualley had been cast in lead roles in the period drama film Novitiate, which would begin filming in January in Nashville, Tennessee. Kat Westergaard was hired as the director of photography. Novitiate marked the film scoring debut for composer Christopher Stark, who is an assistant professor of music at Washington University in St. Louis as of 2017. According to Stark, he had "about a week" to compose the score, the process of which "happen[ed] really fast".

== Release ==
The film had its world premiere at the Sundance Film Festival on January 20, 2017. Shortly after, Sony Pictures Classics acquired worldwide distribution rights to the film. It was released on October 27, 2017. It was released in Canada on November 3, 2017. Over ten weeks, the film grossed $580,346 at 163 North American theaters.

== Reception ==
=== Critical response ===
On review aggregator Rotten Tomatoes, the film has a score of 85% based on 103 reviews, and an average rating of 7.2/10. The website's consensus reads, "Led by a gripping performance from Melissa Leo, Novitiate grapples uncompromisingly – and ultimately compellingly – with questions of faith and feminism." On Metacritic, it has an average score of 73/100 based on 30 critics.

=== Accolades ===
Award	Date of ceremony	Category	Recipient(s)	Result
AARP Movies for Grownups Awards	February 5, 2018	Best Supporting Actress	Melissa Leo	Nominated
Black Reel Awards	February 23, 2018	Outstanding Director, Motion Picture	Maggie Betts	Nominated
Black Reel Awards	February 23, 2018	Outstanding Screenplay, Motion Picture	Maggie Betts	Nominated
Black Reel Awards	February 23, 2018	Outstanding First Screenplay	Maggie Betts	Won
Black Reel Awards	February 23, 2018	Outstanding Emerging Filmmaker	Maggie Betts	Nominated
Camerimage	2017	Best Directorial Debut	Maggie Betts	Nominated
Capri Hollywood International Film Festival	2018	Capri Supporting Actress Award	Melissa Leo	Won
Detroit Film Critics Society Awards	2017	Best Supporting Actress	Melissa Leo	Nominated
Gotham Awards	November 27, 2017	Audience Award	Novitiate	Nominated
Gotham Awards	November 27, 2017	Bingham Ray Breakthrough Director Award	Maggie Betts	Nominated
Guadalajara International Film Festival	2018	Best Feature Film	Novitiate	Nominated
Hamptons International Film Festival	2017	Tangerine Entertainment Juice Award	Maggie Betts	Won
San Francisco Film Critics Circle Awards	December 10, 2017	Best Supporting Actress	Melissa Leo	Nominated
Satellite Awards	February 11, 2018	Best Actress in a Supporting Role	Melissa Leo	Nominated
Sundance Film Festival	January 19 to January 29, 2017	Special Jury Prize - Dramatic	Maggie Betts	Won
Sundance Film Festival	January 19 to January 29, 2017	Grand Jury Prize	Novitiate	Nominated
Women's Image Network Awards	2018	Outstanding Feature Film	Novitiate	Won
Women's Image Network Awards	2018	Outstanding Actress Feature Film	Melissa Leo	Nominated
