= Gideon's Army =

- Directed by: Dawn Porter
- Written by: Matthew Hamachek & Dawn Porter
- Produced by: Julie Goldman, Dawn Porter and Summer Damon
- Starring: Sharon Norwood-Lewis
- Distributed by: HBO
- Release date: 2013
- Country: United States

Gideon's Army is a 2013 American documentary film about three public defenders in the Southern United States. The movie is directed by Dawn Porter. Its title comes from Gideon v. Wainwright, which required that indigent criminal defendants be offered counsel at trial. The film received the Ridenhour Documentary Film Prize in 2014, as well as the Candescent Award at the 2013 Sundance Film Festival.

== Synopsis ==
Gideon’s Army explores the journeys of three young public defenders in the Deep South challenging assumptions in a strained criminal justice system.
