= Dawn Porter (filmmaker) =

American film director

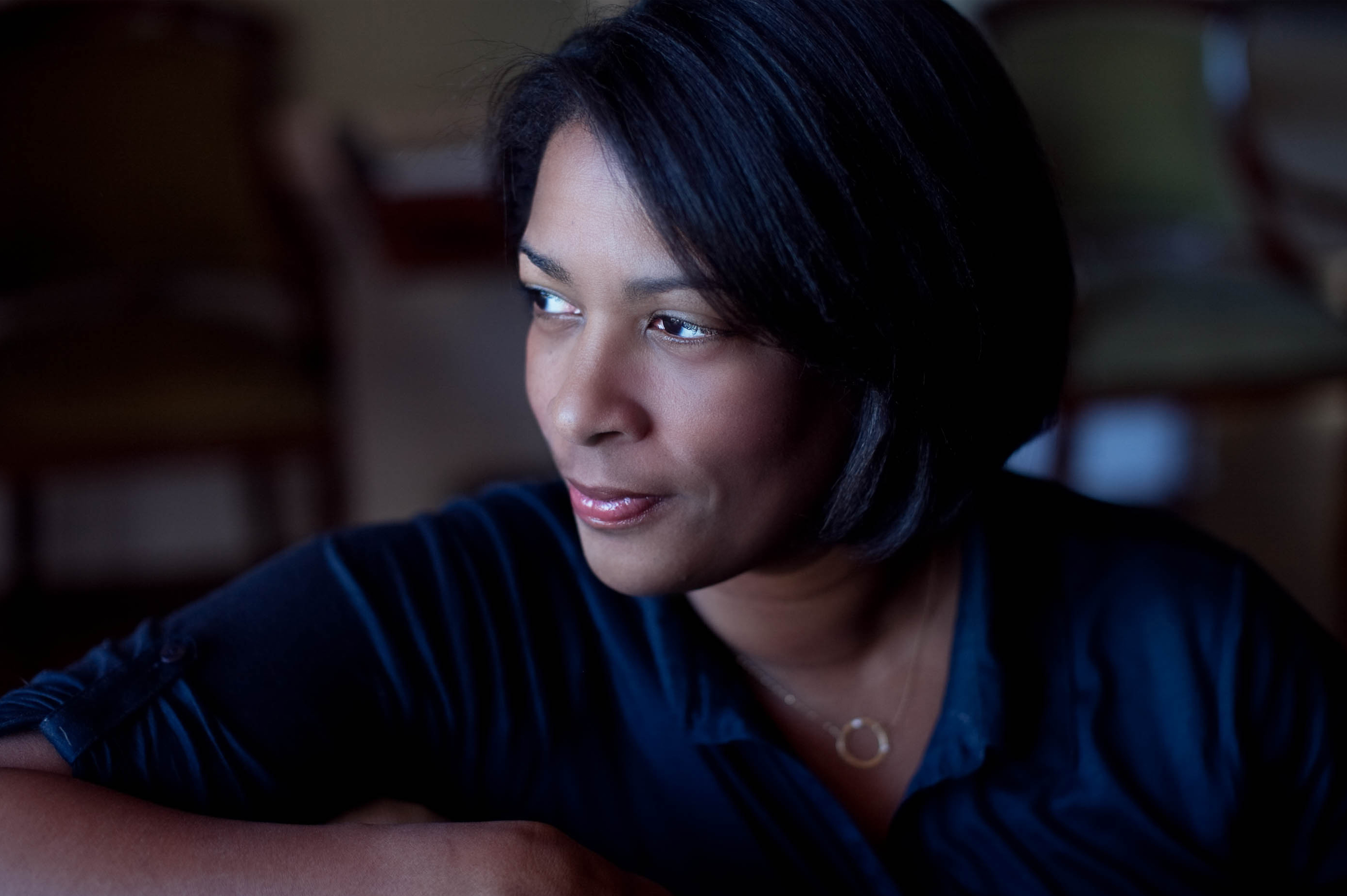
- Education: Swarthmore College (BA); Georgetown University (JD)

Dawn Porter is an American documentary film director, producer, and founder of production company Trilogy Films. Her documentaries have screened at The Sundance Film Festival and other festivals as well as on HBO, CNN, Netflix, Hulu, PBS and elsewhere. She has made biographical documentaries about a number of historical figures including Robert F. Kennedy, Vernon Jordan, Nelson Mandela and John Lewis and has collaborated with Oprah and Prince Harry.

== Early life and education ==
Porter is a graduate of the Bronx High School of Science, Swarthmore College (in 1988) and Georgetown University Law School. Through her mother's family, she is related to Paul Robeson.

== Career ==
Porter served five years as a corporate litigator at BakerHostetler before she was hired as director of standards and practices at ABC News. While there, she met the Academy Award-winning documentary filmmaker Morgan Neville, with whom she helped secure the rights to archival ABC footage for his 2015 Sundance documentary Best of Enemies. She also worked as a VP in standards and practices for five years at A&E before deciding to branch out on her own in 2010.

Prior to becoming a documentary director, she co-executive produced a number of films including the 2009 narrative film Serious Moonlight, which was Cheryl Hines' directorial debut based on a screenplay by Adrienne Shelly. In 2011, she executive produced The Green, an independent film directed by Steven Williford based on a script by Paul Marcarelli.

On her transition from lawyer to documentary filmmaker, Porter said: "The rigor, the analysis, not being just swayed by your emotion, really understanding your facts and building your stories from there. When you think about what film does and storytelling does, you’re communicating something complicated to an audience – and that’s what I did as a litigator."

She financed her directorial debut, the 2013 Gideon's Army, with assistance from the Ford Foundation. The documentary about three black public defenders working in the American Deep South premiered at the Sundance Film Festival in 2013, where it won the festival's "Documentary Editing Award". The film also won the Creative Promise Award at the 2013 Sundance Film Festival. Gideon’s Army premiered on HBO in July 2013, and was later nominated for an Emmy Award, and an Independent Spirit Award for Best Documentary Feature. The film also won the Ridenhour Award for best documentary film in 2014.

In his review of the film in The New York Times, critic Stephen Holden explained that the title of the film refers to "Gideon's Army," the idealistic public defenders. The army is named after Clarence Earl Gideon, who was arrested in 1961 for stealing soda and a few dollars from a pool hall in Panama City, Fla. Without money to afford to hire a lawyer, he was convicted and imprisoned. While in prison, he appealed his case to the U.S. Supreme Court, resulting in the landmark 1963 decision Gideon v. Wainwright holding that a criminal defendant who cannot afford to hire a lawyer must be provided one at no cost.

Gideon's Army examines two cases of armed robbery, for which conviction in Georgia carries a minimum sentence of 10 years without parole and a maximum of life imprisonment. Holden notes that "in both cases, the movie doesn’t try to assess innocence or guilt but to show its lawyers mounting the best defenses possible with minimal resources."

Porter's second film project was Spies of Mississippi, which debuted on PBS in 2014. It is 53-minute documentary shot in black and white about Mississippi State Sovereignty Commission (MSSC) efforts to preserve segregation during the 1950s and 1960s, including the use of an extensive spy network and violent cover-ups. The film was written by Rick Bowers and directed by Porter.

In 2015, Porter directed and produced Rise: The Promise of My Brother’s Keeper, a film for The Discovery Channel chronicling President Obama’s program to help young men of color succeed.

Trapped premiered at Sundance Film Festival in 2016. It shows the impact of anti-abortion laws on abortion providers in the South along with chronicling the last remaining abortion clinic in Mississippi. Porter says she decided it was her duty to make this film after discovering there was only one abortion clinic in the entire state of Mississippi. During production, she and her team spent three years filming in abortion clinics spending time in Mississippi, Alabama and Texas. She interviewed abortion providers including Dr. Willie Parker.

The title of the documentary was derived from the term TRAP Laws ("Targeted Regulation of Abortion Providers"), which have led to the closure of hundreds of southern US clinics mainly in areas that service poor women and women of color. Due to the film's potent subject matter on abortion, police were hired to stand guard outside screenings, and to check for weapons at the door.

She produced a biography of Chef Alexandra Guarnaschelli for the Cooking Channel.

Her one-hour documentary about Vernon Jordan, Vernon Jordan: Make it Plain, premiered on PBS on September 1, 2020. The film includes interviews with historian Henry Louis Gates and former President Bill Clinton, whom Jordan served as an advisor.

Also in 2020, Porter's documentary John Lewis: Good Trouble about the late civil rights icon John Lewis, which screened at the Tribeca Film Festival, was released by Magnolia Pictures theatrically and on Apple, Amazon and other streaming platforms. The film features interviews with Bill Clinton, Hillary Clinton, the late Elijah Cummings, Alexandria Ocasio-Cortez, Ayanna Pressley, Henry Louis Gates Jr., Nancy Pelosi, Cory Booker, Stacey Abrams and Ilhan Omar.

The Way I See It, a documentary about White House photographer Pete Souza and his time behind the scenes during Ronald Reagan and Barack Obama's presidencies. It premiered at the 2020 Toronto International Film Festival and opened in 124 theaters the following weekend, grossing an estimated $25,000 with a per-theater average of $200, per Deadline. The documentary was released by Focus Features, MSNBC Films and Peacock. To coincide with the November 2020 election, the film made its debut on MSNBC on October 9 and was then available to stream on Peacock starting October 23.

In 2021, Porter's documentary, Rise Again: Tulsa and the Red Summer, about the Tulsa Race Massacre, premiered on Juneteenth on Hulu and National Geographic Channel. Deneen Brown, an award-winning Washington Post journalist who has written about the massacre, appears frequently in Rise Again as well as in Tulsa: The Fire and the Forgotten, a documentary which she produced and which premiered on PBS on the 100th anniversary of the Massacre. In a review of the film for Variety, Lisa Kennedy wrote: "Among Porter’s skills is her ability to ask questions of institutions while hewing to the human subjects driving her narratives."

In 2021, she directed and produced The Me You Can’t See: A Path Forward, a town hall style "companion piece" to the original Apple + documentary The Me You Can't See, in which Oprah and Prince Harry discuss mental health. It premiered for free on Apple TV on May 28, 2021.

In 2022, Porter partnered with Nicole Newnham on a four-part docu-series 37 Words, for ESPN, which premiered on June 21, 2022, celebrating the 50th anniversary of Title IX. That same year, she returned to Sundance as executive producer of Paula Eiselt and Tonya Lewis Lee’s Hulu documentary Aftershock, which delves into the crisis of Black maternal mortality in the United States.

Her 2023 archival documentary The Lady Bird Diaries, premiered at SXSW before airing on Hulu. It relied on 123 hours of personal and revealing audio diaries that Lady Bird recorded during her the presidency of her husband, Lyndon Baines Johnson. ABC Studios had approached her about directing the documentary after seeing her four-part Netflix documentary series Bobby Kennedy for President.

In 2023, Porter's nearly four-hour docu-series Deadlocked: How America Shaped the Supreme Court premiered on Showtime. Porter said she actively sought out interview subjects from across the political spectrum. “I didn’t want it to feel like some liberal diatribe,” she said. Included in the group of legal experts featured in the film are: Ruth Marcus, a Washington Post columnist; Erwin Chemerinsky, the dean of the University of California, Berkeley, school of law; John Bash, a former law clerk for Justice Antonin Scalia; and Theodore B. Olson, solicitor general under President George W. Bush.

In January 2024, Porter returned to Sundance for the third time with her 10th documentary, Luther: Never Too Much, about Luther Vandross. The film featured interviews with Jamie Foxx, who was one of the documentary's producers, and Dionne Warwick.Colin Firth was among the film's executive producers In May 2024, CNN announced it had acquired the documentary with plans to show it on CNN, OWN and Max.

In February 2024, Porter announced she was working on a documentary on the relationship between Nelson Mandela and his wife Winnie Mandela, based on Winnie and Nelson: Portrait of a Marriage, by South African writer and scholar Jonny Steinberg. Porter said she will produce through her production company Trilogy Films alongside the Schultz Family Foundation, marking the first time that foundation is venturing into storytelling.

Following its world premiere at DOC NYC in November 2022, Porter's documentary Cirque du Soleil: Without a Net about Cirque du Soleil, premiered in theaters and on Amazon Prime in July 2024.

In 2024, Porter directed the film Power of the Dream which details WNBA player activism during their 2020 season.

Porter directed and executive produced The Sing Sing Chronicles focusing on wrongfully convicted men incarcerated at Sing Sing Correctional Facility for MSNBC. It won best documentary at the 2025 News & Documentary Emmy Awards.

In 2025, Porter executive produced Eyes on the Prize III: We Who Believe in Freedom Cannot Rest, a six-part HBO series which follows the original PBS series Eyes on the Prize.

== Filmography ==
Year	Film	Director	Producer
2013	Gideon's Army	Yes	Yes
2014	Spies of Mississippi	Yes	Yes
2015	Rise: The Promise of My Brother’s Keeper	Yes	Yes
2016	Trapped	Yes	Yes
2018	Bobby Kennedy for President	Yes	Yes
2020	John Lewis: Good Trouble	Yes	Yes
2020	The Way I See It	Yes	Yes
2020	Vernon Jordan: Make It Plain	Yes	Yes
2021	The Me You Can't See	No	Yes
2021	Rise Again: Tulsa and the Red Summer	Yes	Yes
2022	37 Words	Yes	Yes
2023	Deadlocked: How America Shaped the Supreme Court	Yes	Yes
2023	The Lady Bird Diaries	Yes	Yes
2024	The Sing Sing Chronicles	Yes	Yes
2024	Luther: Never Too Much	Yes	Yes
2024	Power of the Dream	Yes	Yes

== See also ==
- African American cinema
