= Chasing Trane: The John Coltrane Documentary =

- Film Poster
- Directed by: John Scheinfeld
- Written by: John Scheinfeld
- Produced by: John Beug; Dave Harding; Scott Pascucci; Spencer Proffer
- Starring: Denzel Washington; Reggie Workman; Ravi Coltrane; Ashley Kahn; Sonny Rollins
- Cinematography: Stanley Taylor
- Edited by: Peter S. Lynch II
- Production companies: Meteor 17; Crew Neck Productions
- Distributed by: Abramorama
- Release dates: September 9, 2016 (TIFF); April 14, 2017 (United States)
- Running time: 99 minutes
- Country: United States
- Language: English
- Box office: $406,284

Chasing Trane: The John Coltrane Documentary is a 2016 American documentary film, written and directed by John Scheinfeld. The film premiered at the 2016 Toronto International Film Festival.

== Plot ==
The film is about the life and career of American jazz saxophonist and composer John Coltrane.

== Cast ==
- Denzel Washington as John Coltrane (voice)
- Reggie Workman as himself
- Ravi Coltrane as himself
- Ashley Kahn as himself
- Sonny Rollins as himself
- Carlos Santana as himself

== Reception ==
On review aggregator Rotten Tomatoes, the film has an approval rating of 73% based on 37 reviews, with an average rating of 7.2/10. On Metacritic, the film has a score of 69 out of 100, based on 13 critics, indicating "generally favorable reviews".

The Hollywood Reporter's critic Todd McCarthy wrote: "Director John Scheinfeld's doc is a comprehensive, engrossing and, it's tempting to say, worshipful account of the life of the music titan." Pat Padua from The Washington Post gave the film three out of four stars and stated: "In Chasing Trane: The John Coltrane Documentary, documentarian John Scheinfeld shows that the music of one of jazz's most experimental saxophone players still speaks to audiences today." Noel Murray writing for the Los Angeles Times said: "John Scheinfeld's Chasing Trane: The John Coltrane Documentary ought to appeal to longtime fans as well as neophytes. For the former, the doc is filled with rare performance clips, alongside insightful interviews with family, colleagues and famous fans. For newcomers, Chasing Trane gives a good overview of the man's biography and influence. The movie tracks the development of his compositions, from the achingly beautiful pop riffs of the ‘50s to the improvisatory avant-garde prayers of the ‘60s." Mark Feeney from The Boston Globe gave it two and a half stars and wrote: "Chasing Trane has two great virtues. One is Denzel Washington reading excerpts from Coltrane's writings. He's an inspired choice. Somehow that majestic, reedy voice evokes the character of Coltrane. The other virtue is home-movie footage. Coltrane, in his person no less than in his music, always seemed so imposing, probably the closest jazz has come to a biblical figure. Here we get to see him relaxed, casual, not searching for that somewhere else but happily right there. The last thing we see before the credits, he's outside with two of his sons. He mugs for the camera, breaks into a grin, bows. It's absolutely glorious." Variety's Chief Film Critic Owen Gleiberman wrote: "Chasing Trane is a seductive piece of middle-of-the-road documentary filmmaking; it gives you the basics, but beautifully. (You could walk into this movie knowing nothing about Coltrane and walk out an impassioned convert.)" Glenn Kenny from RogerEbert.com gave the film three and a half out of four stars and stated: "“Chasing Trane” streamlines the story of the jazz saxophonist, but it does so in a way that doesn't feel like cheating. Scheinfeld's approach is to give the viewer the forest, point out a few trees and get out, confident that those trees will inspire the viewer to spend more time in the forest." One of few dissonant voices were Richard Brody from The New Yorker, who didn't like the film, and called it: "A dully conventional film about a brilliantly unconventional musician"

Chasing Trane: The John Coltrane Documentary was nominated for a Black Reel Awards in the category of Outstanding Documentary Feature.
