= Pete Souza =

American photographer (born 1954)

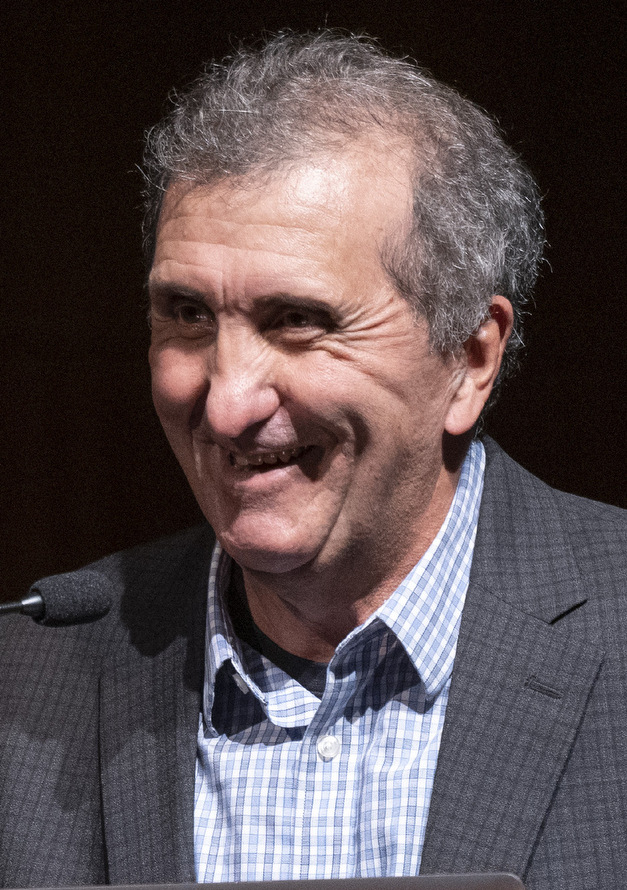
- Souza in 2022

Chief Official White House Photographer
- In office January 20, 2009 – January 20, 2017
- President: Barack Obama
- Preceded by: Eric Draper
- Succeeded by: Shealah Craighead
- In office June 1983 – January 20, 1989
- President: Ronald Reagan
- Preceded by: Michael Evans
- Succeeded by: David Valdez

Personal details
- Born: Peter Joseph Souza; December 31, 1954 (age 71) New Bedford, Massachusetts, U.S.
- Spouse: Patti Lease (m. 2013)
- Education: Boston University (BS); Kansas State University (MS)
- Website: PeteSouza.com

Peter Joseph Souza (born December 31, 1954) is an American photojournalist, the former chief official White House photographer for Presidents of the United States Ronald Reagan and Barack Obama and the former director of the White House Photography Office. He was a photographer with The Chicago Tribune, stationed at the Washington, D.C., bureau from 1998 to 2007; during this period, he also followed the rise of then-Senator Obama to the presidency.

== Early life ==
Souza was born in New Bedford, Massachusetts and grew up in South Dartmouth, Massachusetts, the son of a nurse and a boat mechanic. He is of Portuguese ancestry; both sets of his grandparents emigrated from the Azores.

Souza graduated cum laude with a Bachelor of Science in public communication from Boston University and a master's degree in journalism and mass communication from Kansas State University.

== Career ==
=== Early career ===
Souza started his career in the 1970s in Kansas at the Chanute Tribune and the Hutchinson News. In the early 1980s, he was a photographer for the Chicago Sun-Times.

=== With Ronald Reagan ===
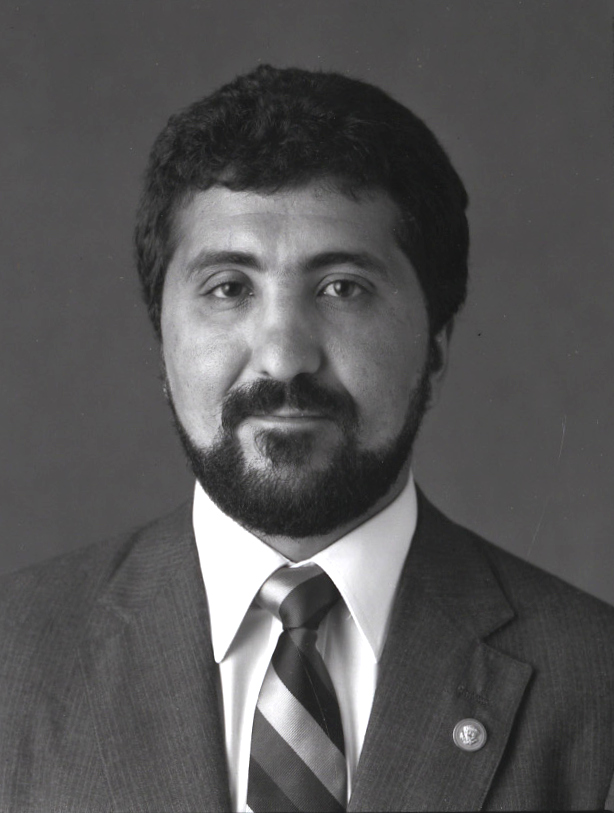
Souza in 1983, during his time as Official White House photographer of the Reagan administration

He served as an official White House photographer for President Ronald Reagan from June 1983 until 1989. He was also the official photographer for the funeral services of Ronald Reagan in 2004.

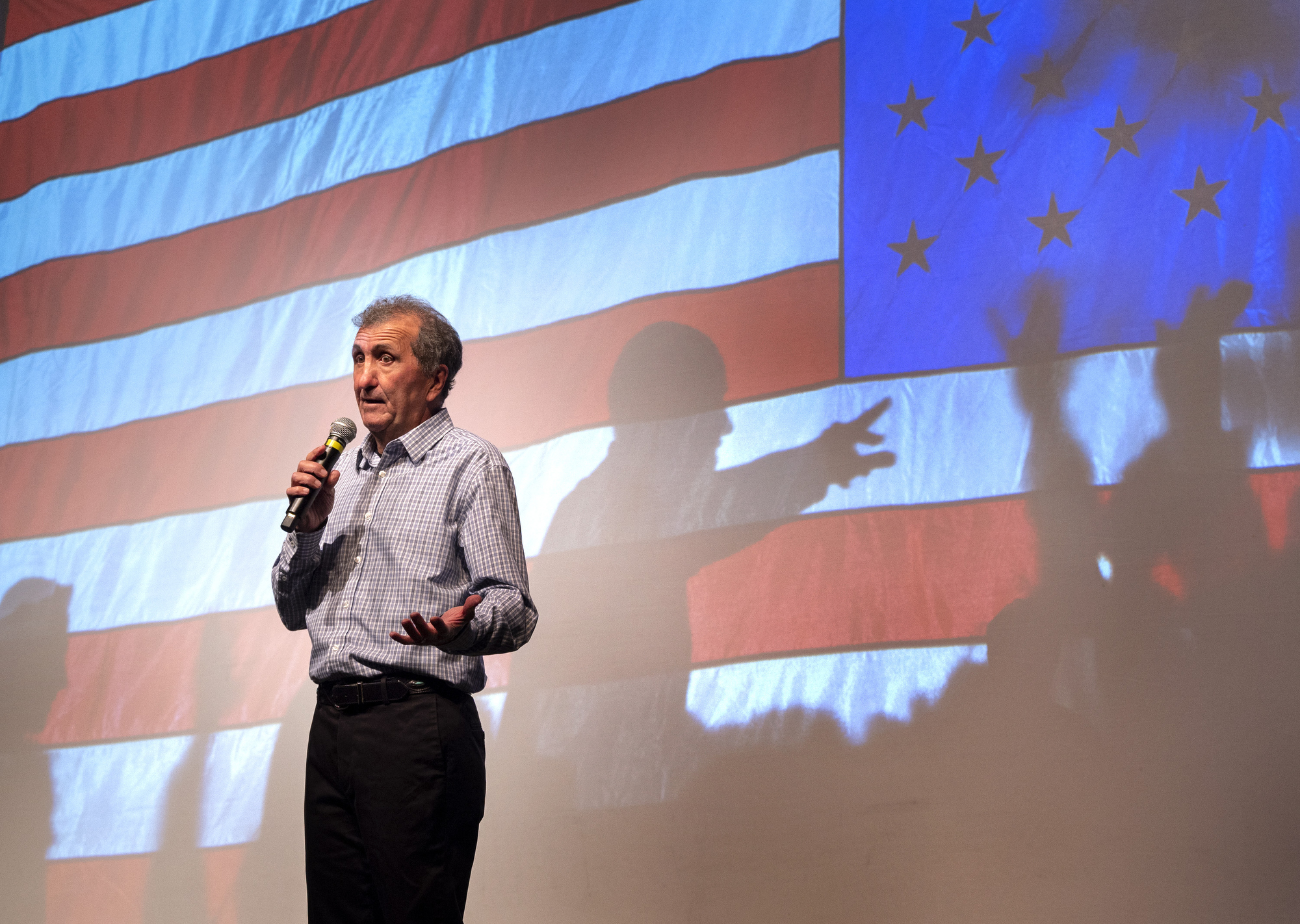
Souza at the LBJ Presidential Library in 2022

At the end of the Reagan administration, Souza continued to be based in Washington, D.C. Between 1998 and 2007, he was a photographer for the Chicago Tribune Washington, D.C., bureau. Souza has also worked as a freelancer for National Geographic and Life magazines. After the September 11, 2001, terrorist attacks, he was among the first journalists to cover the war in Afghanistan and the fall of Kabul.

=== With Barack Obama ===
In 2004, Jeff Zeleny, now a political correspondent for CNN, asked Souza to take photographs for a project documenting Barack Obama's first year as a U.S. senator.

Souza covered Obama's arrival to the Senate in 2005 and met him for the first time on Obama's first day in the Senate. He documented Obama's time in the Senate, following him on many foreign trips, including those to Kenya, South Africa, and Russia. In the process, he not only became close to Senator Obama, but ended up following his rise to the presidency. In July 2008, Souza published a bestseller photo-book The Rise of Barack Obama, featuring photographs between 2005 and 2008.

Souza was an assistant professor of photojournalism at Ohio University's School of Visual Communication. After the November 2008 election, he was asked to become the official White House photographer for the second time for the new President-elect Obama. On January 14, 2009, the new presidential portrait was released—the first official presidential portrait taken with a digital camera. A week later, Souza was present at the inauguration and the following day he was the only photographer present for Obama's second swearing-in on Obama's first workday in the Oval Office.

In May 2009, Souza began using Flickr as an official conduit for releasing White House photos. The photos were initially posted with a Creative Commons Attribution license which required that the original photographers be credited. Flickr later created a new license which identified them as "United States Government Work" which does not carry any copyright restrictions.

In 2010, National Geographic produced a program about Souza titled The President's Photographer, which featured Souza as the main subject while also covering the previous White House photographers.

Souza's photograph taken at 4:05 pm on May 1, 2011, in the Situation Room during the raid on Osama bin Laden, featuring Obama, Vice President Joe Biden, Secretary of State Hillary Clinton, and others, quickly became an iconic image. It also became one of the most viewed images on Flickr. Souza's 2009 image of a five-year-old child, Jacob Philadelphia, touching Obama's head has also become iconic. Jacob asked if Obama's hair was similar to his and the image has become symbolic of the African American struggle for civil rights.

As the official White House photographer, Souza traveled with the president to document each meeting, trip and encounter for historical records. Along with his staff, Souza produced up to 20,000 pictures a week. Souza's team included David Lienemann, the official photographer for Joe Biden, and Lawrence Jackson (later the official photographer for Vice President Kamala Harris).

In November 2011, Souza was included on The New Republic's list of Washington's most-powerful, least-famous people.

In October 2013, Souza and his wife, Patti Lease, became the 18th couple to get married at the White House.

As well as using very high end cameras for his presidential photography, Souza occasionally took square shots on his iPhone.

=== Post-Obama administration ===
Interview with Pete Souza about his 2017 book. Video from MSNBC.

In 2017, Souza received a book deal from Little, Brown and Company to publish a book of photos from his tenure as White House photographer titled Obama: An Intimate Portrait: The Historic Presidency in Photographs.

Upon Donald Trump's inauguration as president in 2017, Souza began sharing pictures of Obama on his Instagram account, often as critical commentary on the new administration. In April 2017, he had over one million Instagram followers, and reached two million followers in August 2018 as he continued to critique the Trump presidency through contrasting photographs of Obama. In 2018, he announced the release of a new book titled Shade: A Tale of Two Presidents, juxtaposing the Obama and Trump administrations.

In late 2019, Pete Souza and his family moved to Madison, Wisconsin.

Souza's work during and after the Obama administration is also the subject of the 2020 documentary The Way I See It.

==== Opinions on subsequent Chief Photographers ====
In January 2021, Souza gave advice to Adam Schultz, the incoming Chief Official White House Photographer for President Joe Biden. He also noted that the photographer for outgoing President Trump, Shealah Craighead, had posted "very few behind the scenes pictures" to Flickr during her tenure.

=== Recognition ===
In 2021 Souza was inducted into the International Photography Hall of Fame and Museum.

== Photographs ==
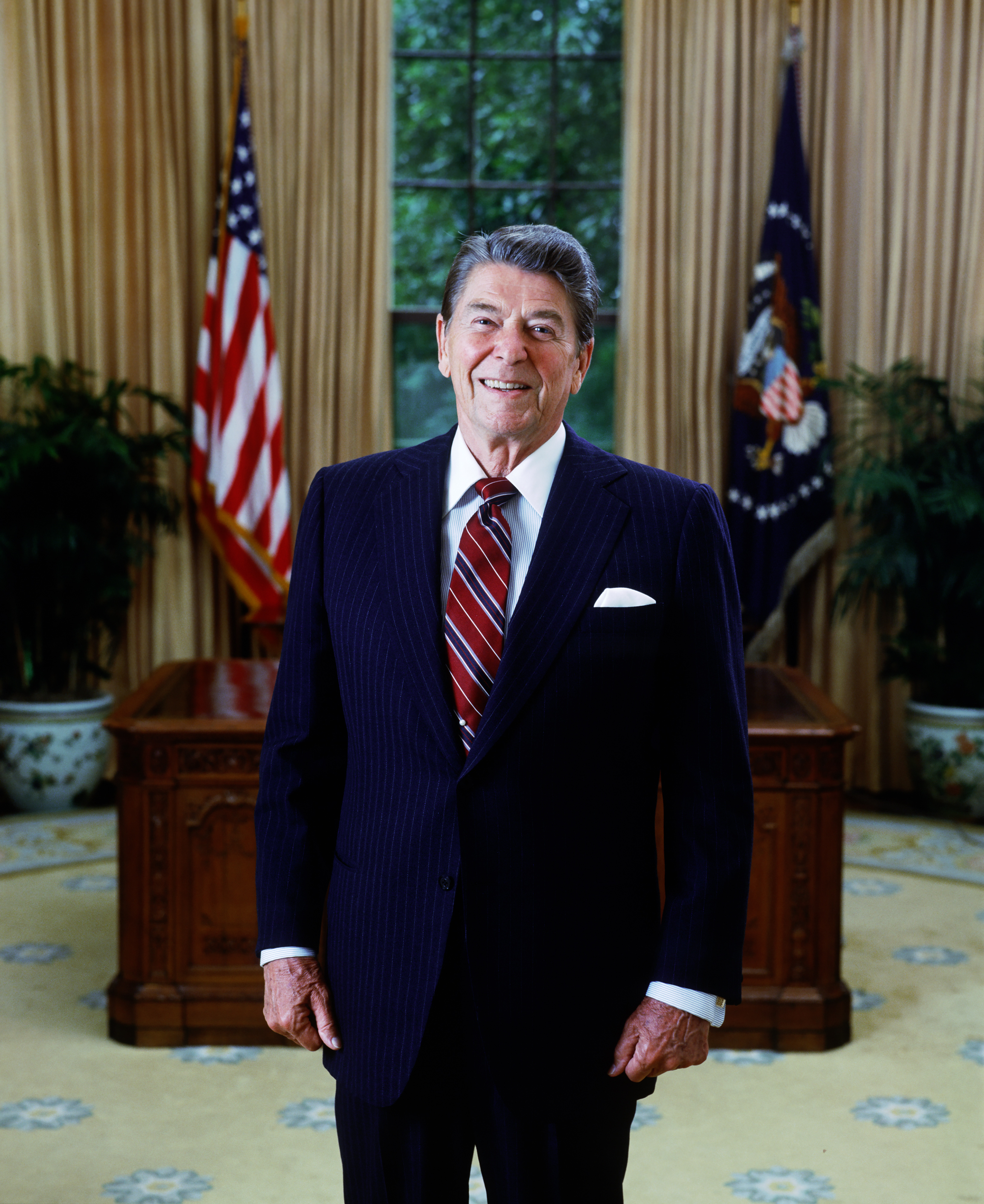
Second-term official portrait of Ronald Reagan, June 1985

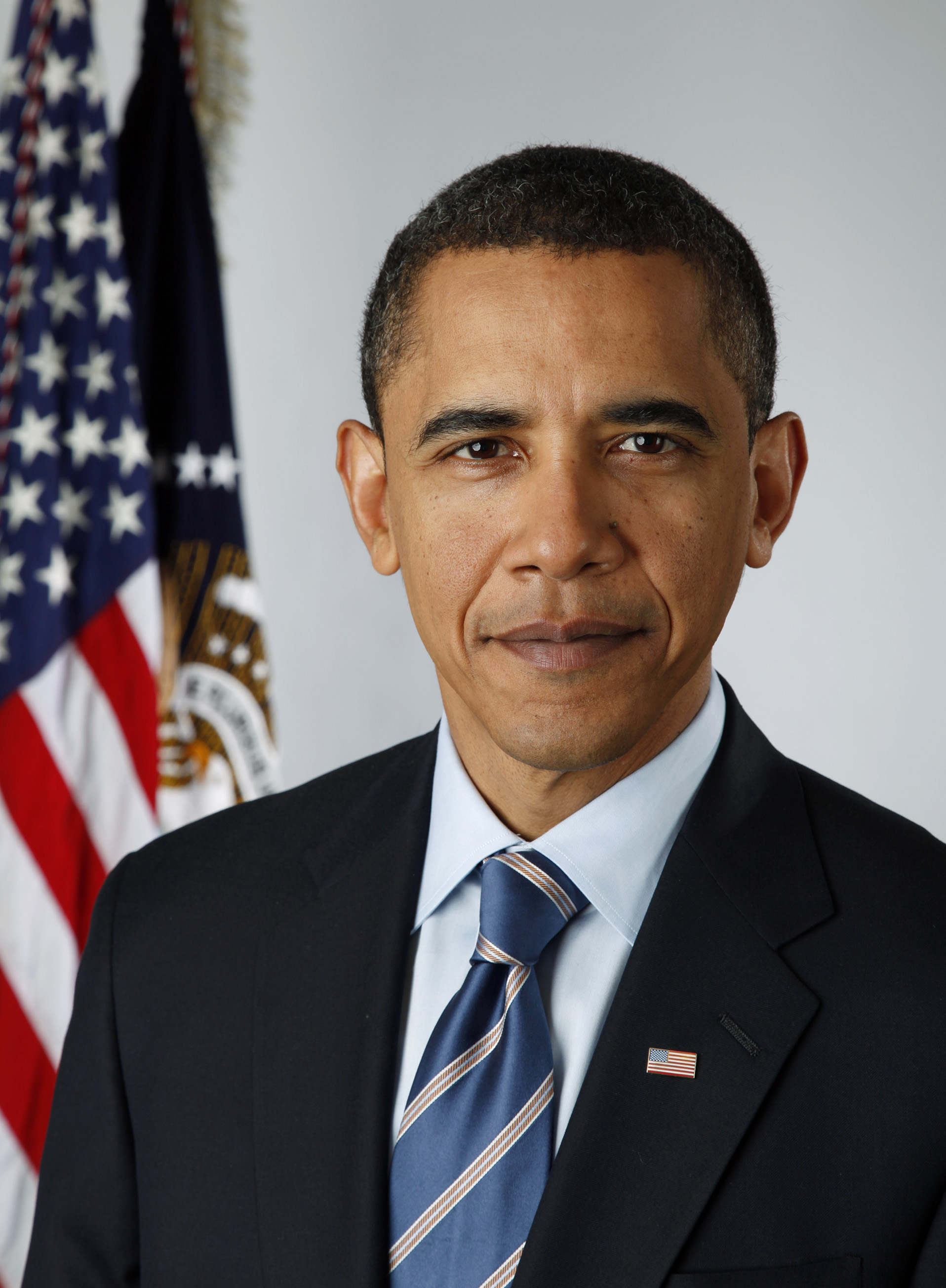
First-term official portrait of Barack Obama, January 2009

Hair Like Mine (2009) depicts Obama bending down to allow a child to touch his hair in the Oval Office

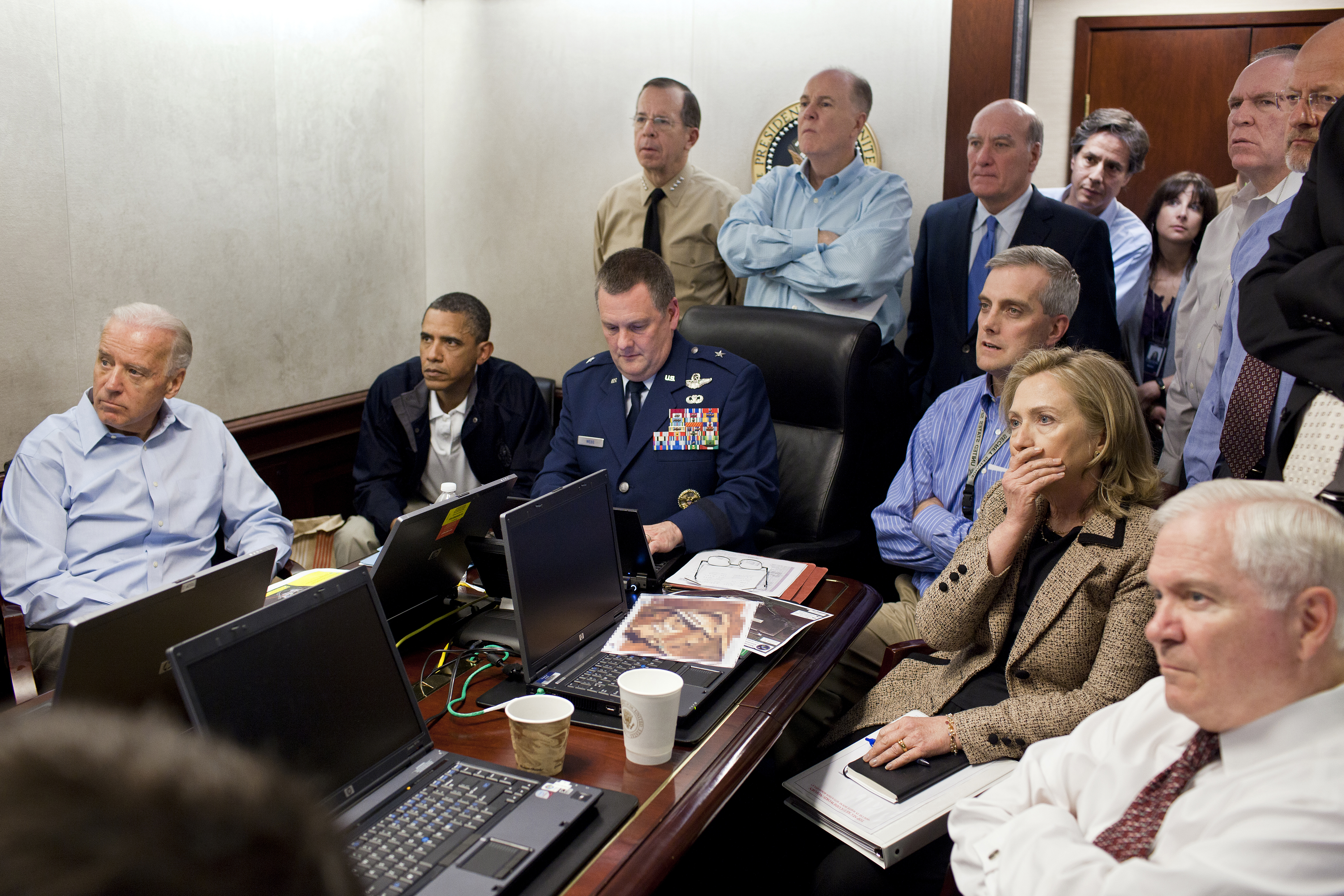
The Situation Room (2011) by Souza became one of the most-viewed on Flickr.

Second-term official portrait of Barack Obama, December 2012

== Books ==
- Unguarded Moments: Behind-the-scenes Photographs of President Reagan, Tapestry Pr, 1997. ISBN 1-930819-37-4
- Plebe summer at the U.S. Naval Academy: photographs. P. Souza, 2003. ISBN 0-9729426-0-2
- Images of Greatness: An Intimate Look at the Presidency of Ronald Reagan, Triumph Books, 2004. ISBN 1-57243-701-4.
- The Rise of Barack Obama, Triumph Books, 2009. ISBN 1-60078-313-9.
- The President's Photographer: Fifty Years Inside the Oval Office, with John Bredar. National Geographic, 2010. ISBN 1-4262-0676-3.
- Obama: An Intimate Portrait, Little, Brown and Company, 2017. ISBN 0-3165-1258-3.
- Shade: A Tale of Two Presidents, Little, Brown and Company, 2018. ISBN 0-3164-2182-0.
- The West Wing and Beyond: What I Saw Inside the Presidency, Pete Souza, Little, Brown and Company, 2022, ISBN 9780316383370.
