= David Lienemann =

American photographer

- Born: 1982 or 1983 (age 42–43)
- Education: Cornell College
- Occupation: Photographer
- Known for: Former official photographer for U.S. Vice President Joe Biden
- Spouse: Sydney
- Children: 1
- Website: www.davidlienemann.com

David Lienemann (born 1982 or 1983) is an American photographer. He was the official White House photographer for Joe Biden during the eight years that he served as Vice President of the United States. In the course of his role, Lienemann took nearly one million photographs.

== Education and career ==
Lienemann graduated from Cornell College with a BA in both economics and business in 2005. Prior to coming to work at the White House, Lienemann covered the 2008 United States presidential race for clients such as The New York Times, Chicago Tribune, Associated Press and Getty Images.

Lienemann published a book of his photographs titled Biden: The Obama Years and the Battle for the Soul of America in 2020. In her foreword to the book, Biden's wife Jill Biden writes that "As David seamlessly wove himself into the day-to-day of Joe’s life, he became something more than just a photographer — he became one of Joe’s most honest advisers. Our friend."

== Personal life and awards ==
Lienemann is based in New Mexico with his wife Sydney and daughter Millie.

In 2015 he received the Young Alumni Achievement Award from Cornell College.

== Gallery ==
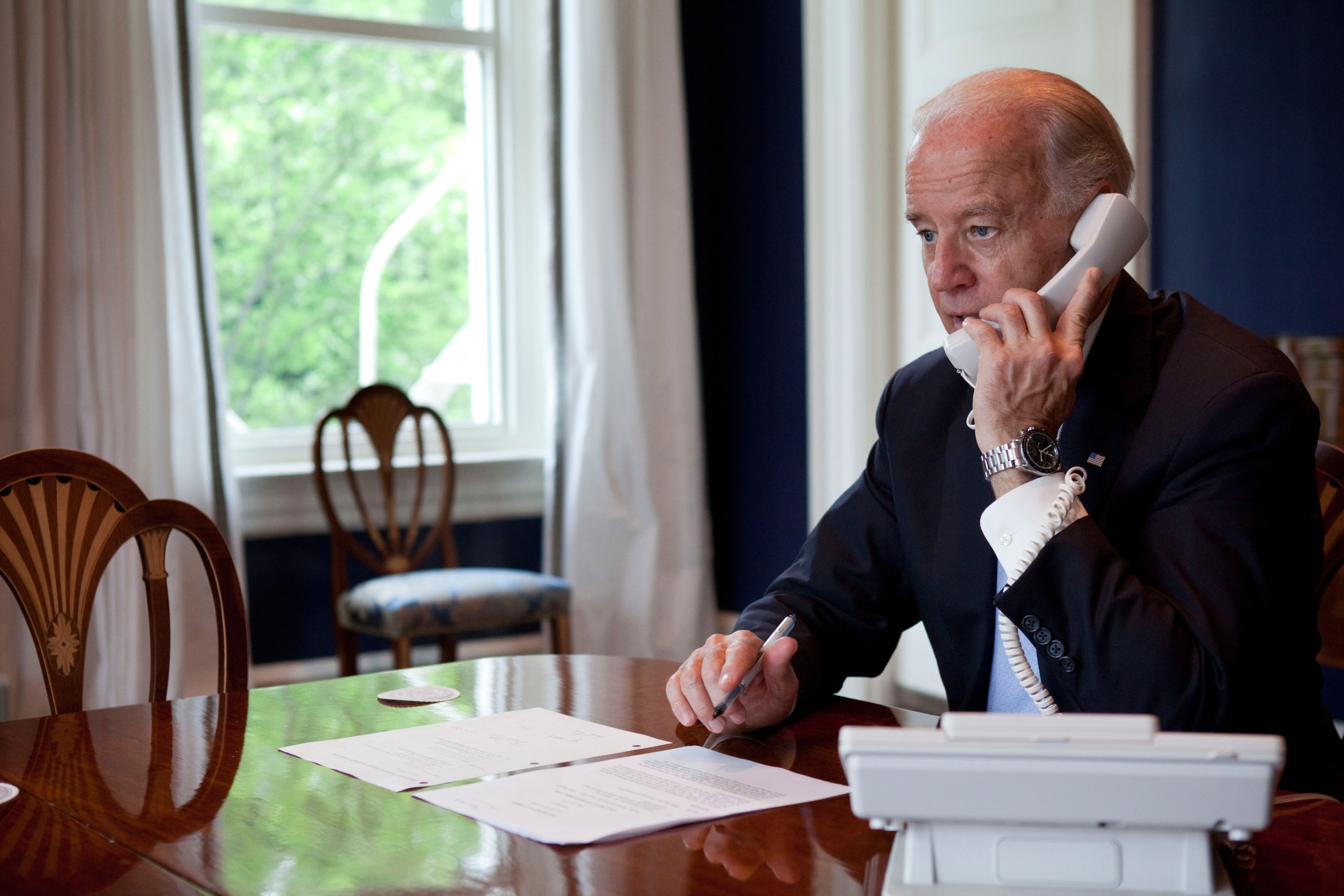
Biden in Number One Observatory Circle (2011)

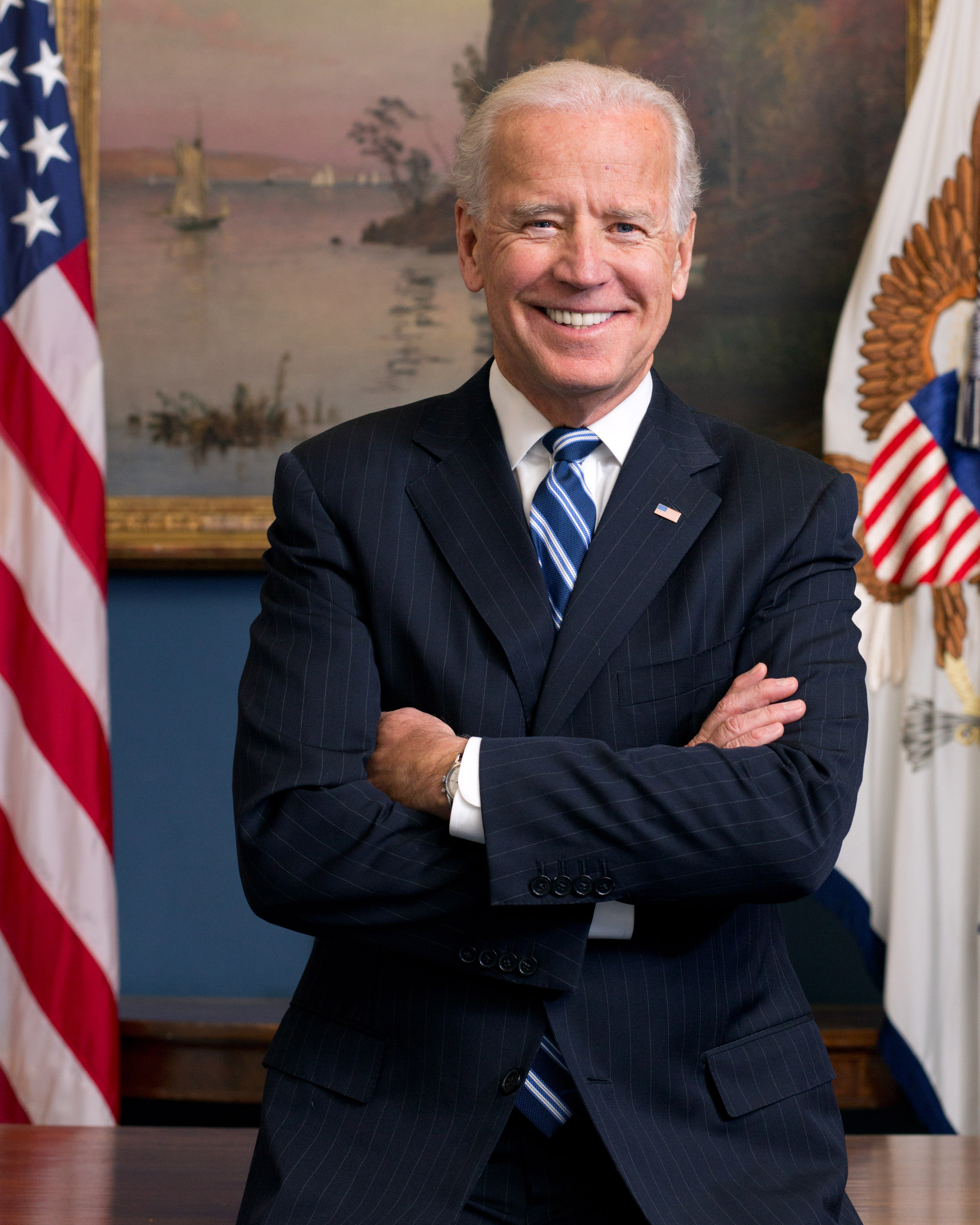
Joe Biden's official portrait (2013)

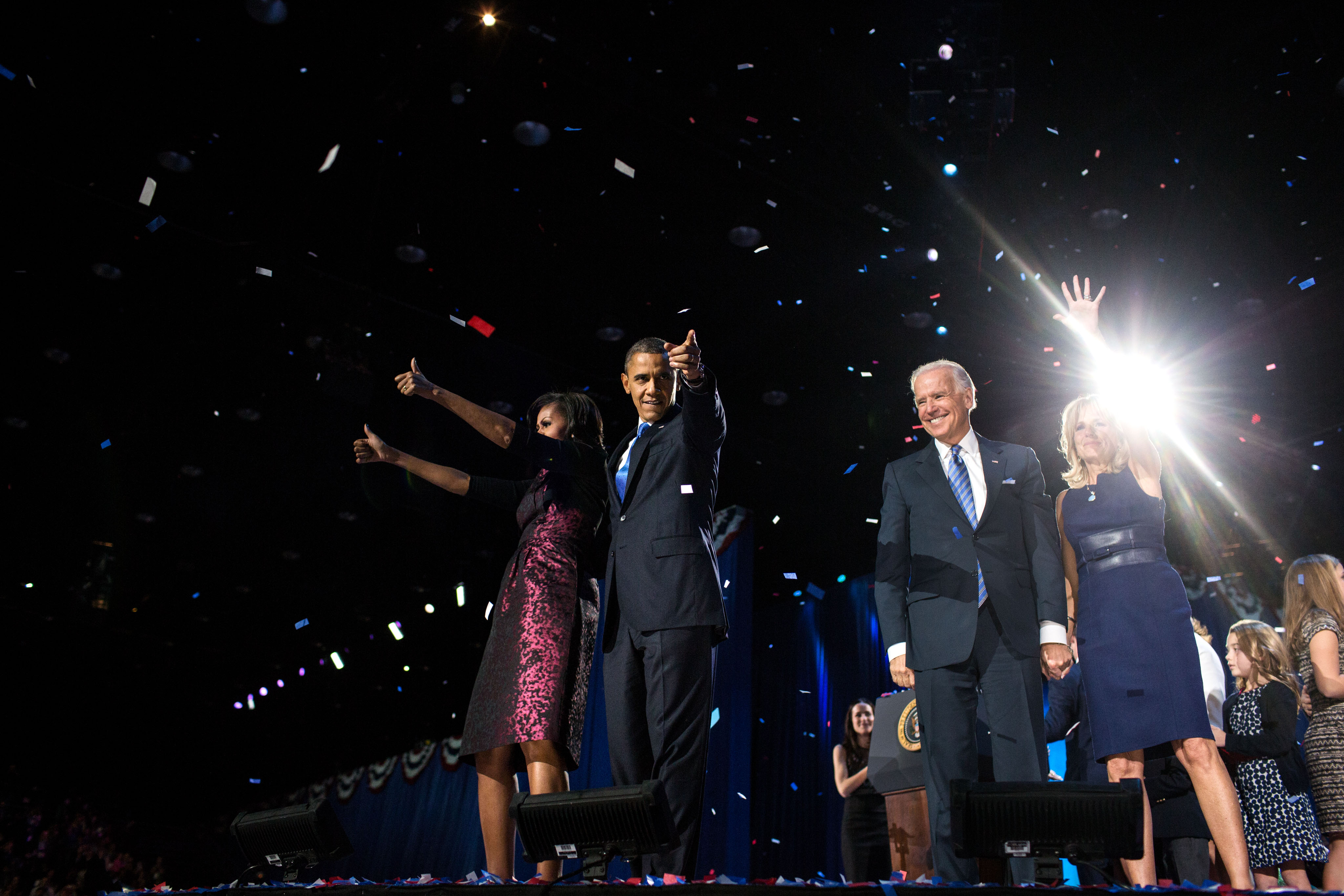
The Obamas and Bidens celebrate re-election (2012)

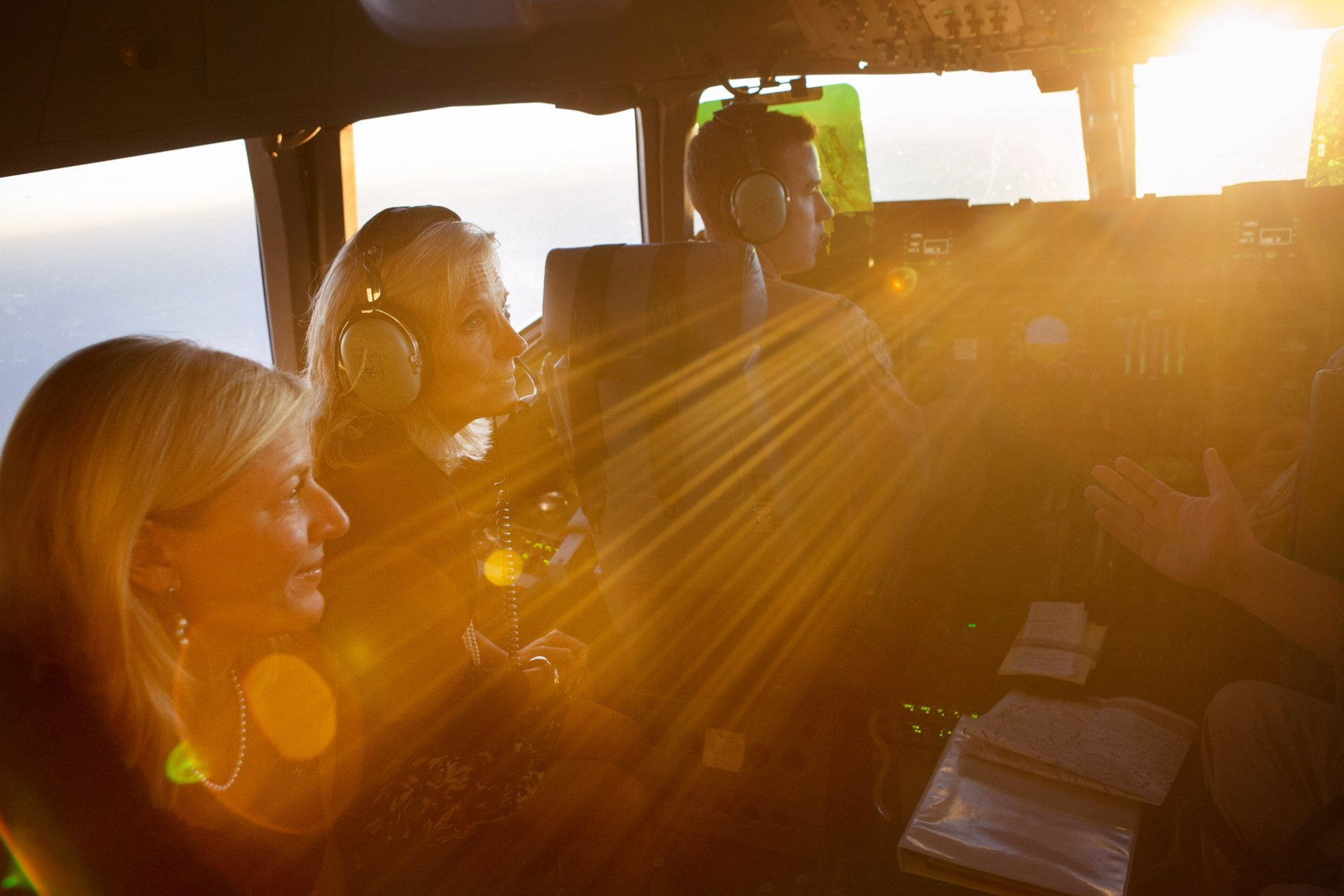
Second Lady Jill Biden in the cockpit of Air Force Two (2010)

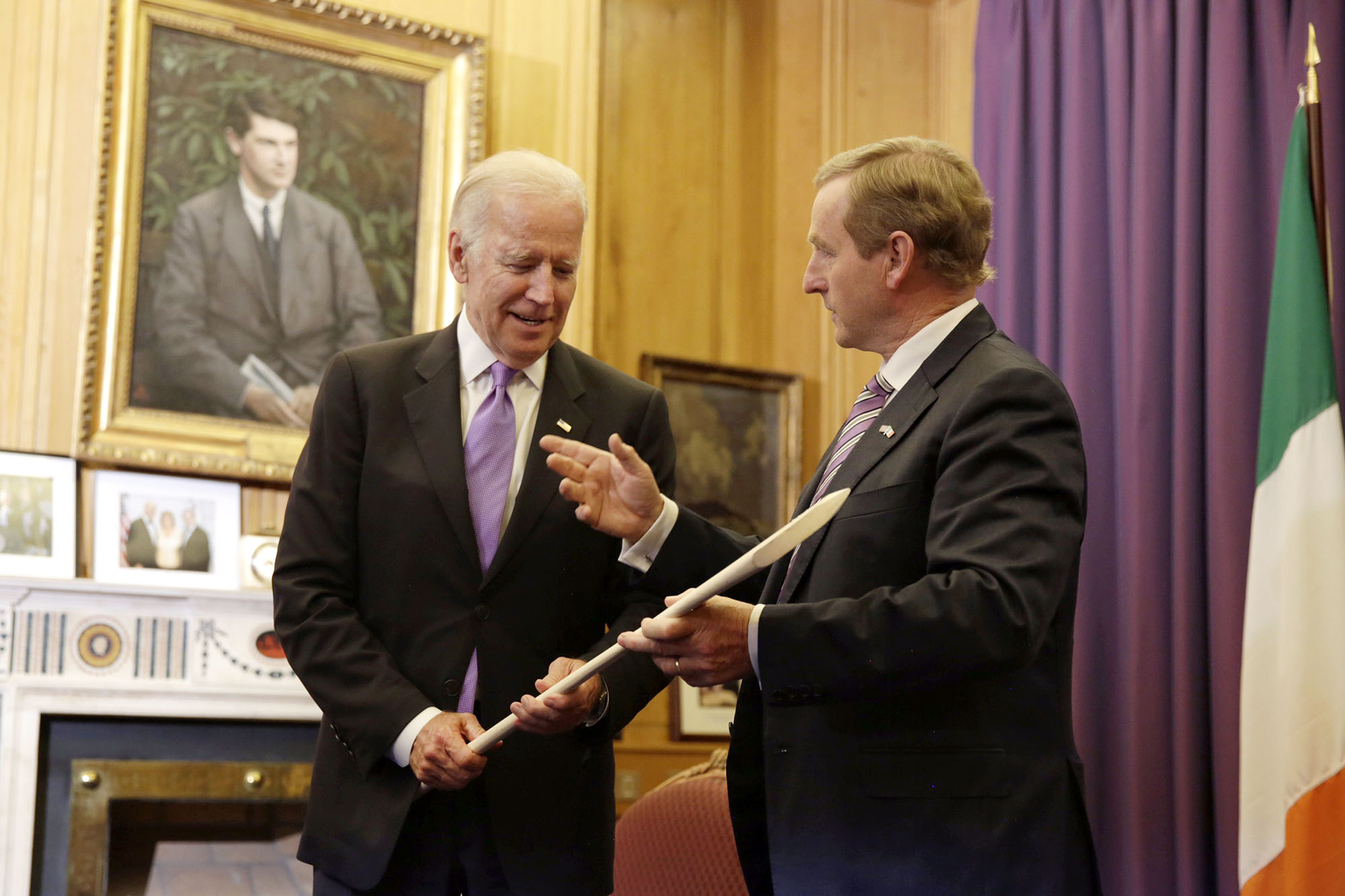
Irish Taoiseach Enda Kenny gives Biden a hurling stick (2016)

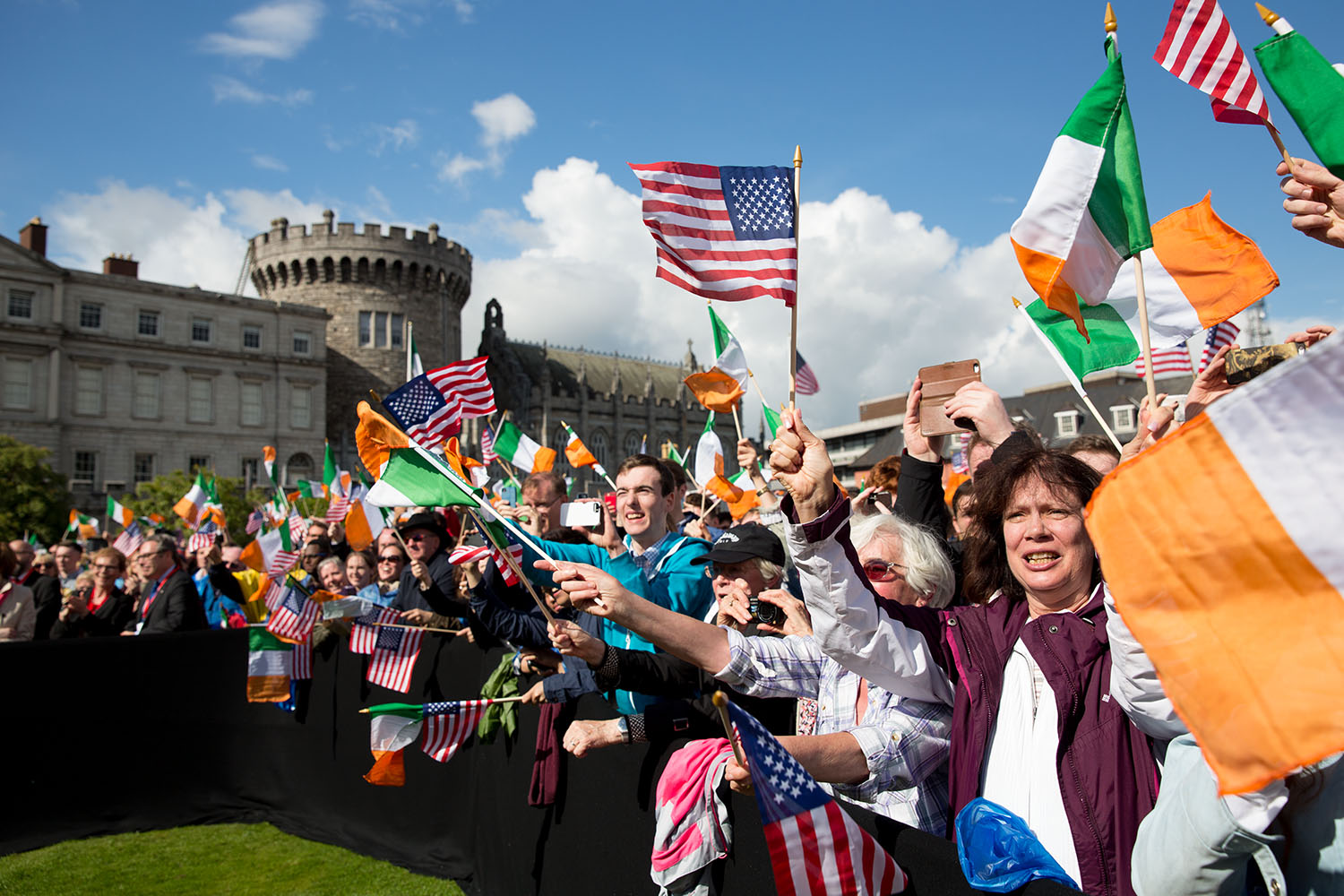
Audience for Biden's remarks at Dublin Castle, Ireland (2016)

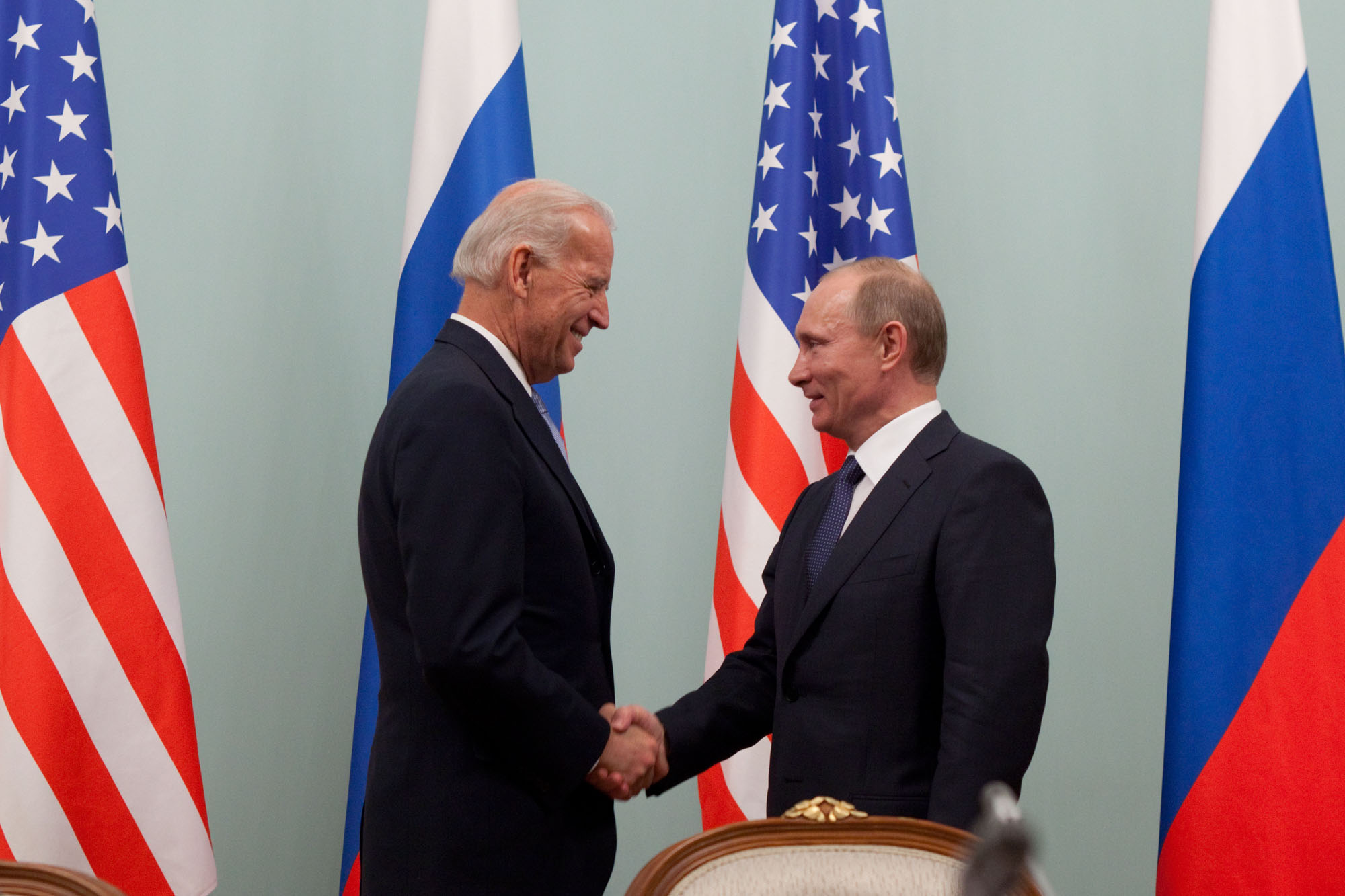
Biden greets Prime Minister of Russia, Vladimir Putin (2011)

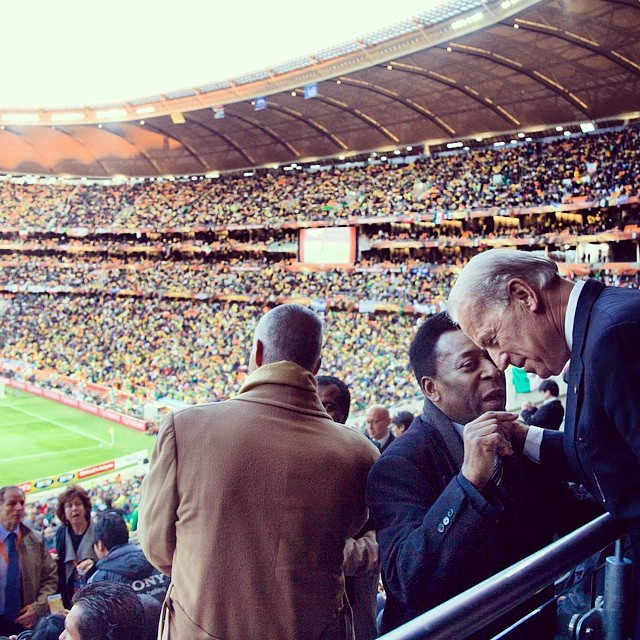
Biden meets Pelé at the 2010 FIFA World Cup

== See also ==
- Chief Official White House Photographer
- Pete Souza (former official photographer for Presidents Ronald Reagan and Barack Obama)
