= Maggie Betts =

American filmmaker

Margaret Betts
- Born: New York City, New York, United States
- Occupation: Filmmaker
- Notable work: Novitiate

Margaret Betts is an American filmmaker. Her debut feature Novitiate was nominated for the Grand Jury Prize at the Sundance Film Festival and received a Jury Award for her direction.

== Background ==
Her father is Roland W. Betts, who had a close personal relationship with former president George W. Bush. The themes of her films are largely inspired by the social consciousness she developed through interactions with former first lady Laura Bush and the work she has done with various United Nations organizations such as UNICEF.

== Career ==
Though she recently signed with CAA, she is also represented by Brillstein Entertainment Partners. She earned her BA in English from Princeton University, and though she was not ultimately selected, earned a coveted spot on Marvel's shortlist of potential directors for Black Widow.

== Films ==
=== The Carrier ===
Betts gained renown following the debut of her 2010 documentary, The Carrier, at the Tribeca Film Festival. This film was largely inspired by her experience fighting to eradicate AIDS in South Africa. The documentary was also selected for festivals such as Big Sky Documentary Film Festival (2012), Documentary Edge Film Festival (2012), One World International Film Festival (2012), Sedona Film Festival (2012), Women's Film Festival (2012), Minneapolis St. Paul Film Festival (2012), Lone Star Film Festival (2011), Zurich Film Festival (2011), The 15th Annual Docu Weeks, and Watch Docs Human Rights Film Festival (2011).

=== Engram ===
Betts wrote and directed the film, Engram (2014), a 25-minute short film featuring Isabel Lucas and Oliver Ackland. This film focuses on the story of two elderly strangers attempting to re-discover a mutual memory as they waited to board a subway train. Betts claimed that the original inspiration for Engram was derived from the experience her mother had as a survivor of a hit-and-run accident in her youth.

Oliver Ackland and Isabel Lucas in Engram

=== Novitiate ===
Betts also served as the writer and director of the film Novitiate (2017). After participation in the Sundance Film Festival in 2017, this film was nominated for the Grand Jury Prize. It explores the story of a young woman who struggles to understand her newly selected religion as she strives to become a nun.

=== The Burial ===
Betts also served as the director of the 2023 film The Burial, starring Tommy Lee Jones, Jamie Foxx, and Jurnee Smollett.

== Awards and recognition ==
- Special Jury Award for Breakthrough Director (2017), Sundance Film Festival for Novitiate
- Nominated, Bingham Ray Breakthrough Director Award (2017), Gotham Awards for Novitiate
