= The Way I See It (film) =

2020 American documentary film

- Theatrical release poster
- Directed by: Dawn Porter
- Produced by: Dawn Porter; Laura Dern; Evan Hayes; Jayme Lemons
- Starring: Pete Souza
- Cinematography: Clair Popkin; Keith Walker
- Edited by: Jessica Congdon
- Music by: Marco Beltrami; Buck Sanders; Brandon Roberts
- Production companies: Focus Features; MSNBC Films; ACE Content; Jaywalker Pictures; Platform One Media; Trilogy Films
- Distributed by: Focus Features (United States); Universal Pictures (International)
- Release dates: September 11, 2020 (TIFF); September 18, 2020 (United States)
- Running time: 102 minutes
- Country: United States
- Language: English
- Box office: $49,030

The Way I See It is a 2020 American documentary film directed and produced by Dawn Porter, revolving around Pete Souza, the former Chief Official White House Photographer. Laura Dern serves as the producer under her Jaywalker Pictures banner.

The film had its world premiere at the Toronto International Film Festival on September 11, 2020. It was released in a limited release on September 18, 2020, by Focus Features, followed by broadcast on MSNBC on October 16, 2020.

== Synopsis ==
The film follows the life of Pete Souza, the former Chief Official White House Photographer to former presidents Ronald Reagan and Barack Obama, as the photographer to the president as Souza uses his photography of Obama as commentary to understand where America is now.

== Production ==
In November 2019, it was announced Dawn Porter would direct and produce the film, with Laura Dern serving as producer under her Jaywalker Pictures banner, with Focus Features distributing. In July 2020, it was announced the film was titled The Way I See It.

== Release ==
The film had its world premiere at the Toronto International Film Festival on September 11, 2020. It was set to have its world premiere at the Telluride Film Festival in September 2020, prior to its cancellation due to the COVID-19 pandemic. It was released in a limited release on September 18, 2020, followed by broadcast on MSNBC on October 16, 2020.

== Critical reception ==
The Way I See It holds an 84% approval rating on review aggregator website Rotten Tomatoes, based on 70 reviews, with an average of 7.3/10. The site's critical consensus reads, "The Way I See It takes an engaging look back at a political era from the unique perspective of the photographer who documented it from the inside." On Metacritic, the film holds a rating of 67 out of 100 based on 17 critics, indicating "generally favorable reviews".
