= Klaus Lienemann =

German footballer (1947–2021)

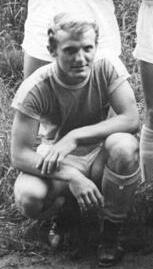
- Klaus Lienemann in 1971

Personal information
- Date of birth: 26 December 1947
- Place of birth: Soviet occupation zone in Germany
- Date of death: 7 June 2021 (aged 73)
- Place of death: Chemnitz, Germany
- Position: Defender

Senior career*
Years	Team	Apps	(Gls)
1970–1976	FC Karl-Marx-Stadt		
1976–1981	BSG Motor Karl-Marx-Stadt		
- * Club domestic league appearances and goals

Klaus Lienemann (26 December 1947 – 7 June 2021) was a German footballer who played as a defender.
