= Trapped (2016 American film) =

- Directed by: Dawn Porter
- Produced by: Marilyn Ness
- Starring: Willie Parker, Amy Hagstrom Miller
- Production company: Trilogy Films
- Distributed by: Abramorama
- Release date: January 28, 2016 (2016 Sundance Film Festival)
- Running time: 81 minutes
- Language: English

Trapped is a 2016 documentary film about doctors who perform abortions in some states in the United States who have been fighting against so-called "TRAP laws" that have been enacted in their states. The film was directed by Dawn Porter, and premiered at the 2016 Sundance Film Festival, where it won a special jury social impact prize. The clinics the film focuses on are mostly located in the South, where there have been a higher number of anti-abortion laws enacted than in any other region of the United States. It was released theatrically on March 4, 2016 in New York City and Washington, DC. It aired on PBS's Independent Lens in June, 2016.

== Reception ==
Trapped has received mostly favorable reviews from critics, with a 77/100 score on Metacritic and a 100% score on Rotten Tomatoes.
