= Sabaah Folayan =

American filmmaker and activist

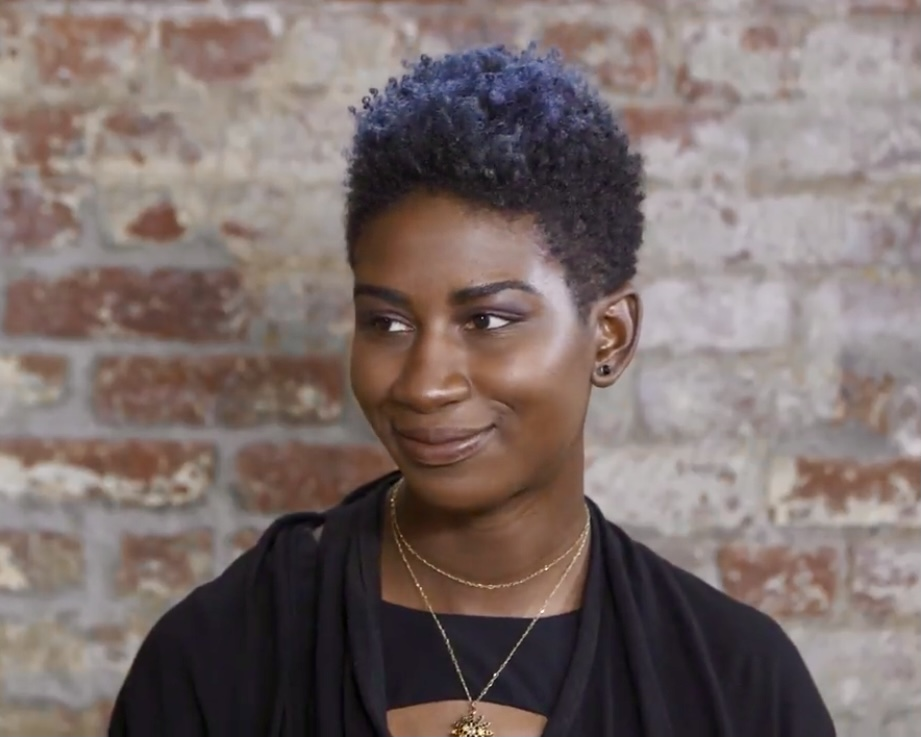
- Folayan in 2017
- Education: Marlborough School; Columbia University
- Occupations: Filmmaker, activist
- Notable work: Whose Streets? Look at Me
- Website: sabaah.is

Sabaah Folayan is an American filmmaker and activist. Her debut documentary feature, Whose Streets?, on the 2014 Ferguson protests, premiered in competition at the 2017 Sundance Film Festival.

== Early life ==
Raised by her mother, musician and visual artist Waberi, Folayan grew up in South Central Los Angeles, as well as spending five years living in a rural area in Hawaii. In Los Angeles, she attended the private, all-girls Marlborough School for middle school and high school and has described the contrast between that environment and the poverty and systemic racism she witnessed her own neighborhood experiencing as akin to growing up "between two worlds." After graduating from Marlborough in 2009, Folayan went on to Columbia University where she was pre-med and earned a degree in biology. She was also a student-athlete and pursued writing and theater in her free time.

Folayan resides in Crown Heights, Brooklyn.

== Career ==
=== Whose Streets? ===
In 2014, Folayan traveled to Ferguson, Missouri during the uprising that followed police officer Darren Wilson's killing of Michael Brown. She initially expected to document the experience via print journalism, but was struck by a sense of contrast between the city she was witnessing and the way it was being represented in the newsmedia, telling Filmmaker Magazine: "what was being put on the news was only catching the surface of the issues. Sensationalist, inflammatory language was hyping the story to get ratings, but as a society we needed to get to the truth and to positive dialogue." Seeking a longer format that would allow space for such an exploration, she set out to make a film, working with cinematographer Lucas Alvarado Farrar, a Columbia classmate of Folayan, and co-director Damon Davis, a St. Louis-based artist. Folayan felt her Ferguson project needed the perspective of someone inside the local community. Davis, already at work documenting the protests, was skeptical of media from outside St. Louis, but found Folayan an exception in her ability to empathize with the community; he was also persuaded to work together by her argument that perspectives of women were critical to telling the story of the protests.

The resulting documentary feature, Whose Streets?, directed and written by Folayan and co-directed by Davis, premiered in competition at the 2017 Sundance Film Festival as a Day One screening. The film received favorable reviews from critics, noting achievements in directing. In The Guardian, Jordan Hoffman gave the film five stars and praised Folayan and Davis's directorial choice to make a "tremendous end run around mainstream news outlets and the agenda-driven narratives that emerge, particularly on television" by not using "images...leaked by law enforcement or stage managed for the media, but [which] come directly from the people who lived through the violent events of 2014." In The Hollywood Reporter, David Rooney said Folayan's "raw connection to the material informs the film's entire approach, investing it with an urgency that never lets up." Reviewing the film for IndieWire, Jude Dry described "Folayan's presence [as] hardly seen, but can be felt in the easy shorthand her subjects use on camera. They have much to say and do so urgently, without fear of being misinterpreted. For comparison, Folayan’s interviews stand in stark contrast to the ones conducted by mainstream media outlets (and their largely white interviewers) she chooses to show."

In February 2017, Magnolia Pictures purchased the project for distribution, planning a summer release commemorating the anniversary of Brown's death. The film opened in theaters August 11, 2017.

=== Look at Me ===
On February 2, 2022, it was announced that Folayan would be the director for the 2022 documentary, Look at Me, about the late rapper and singer XXXTentacion. It was released on Hulu on May 26, 2022.

=== Other projects and influences ===
Folayan was a lead organizer of the New York City Millions March, the December 2014 demonstration protesting police killings in the wake of Eric Garner's death; attendance estimates ranged from 12,000 to 50,000 participants. Folayan has said her experience in Ferguson was pivotal in teaching her organizing skills, that the work should extend beyond attending demonstrations to include "going to meetings, creative acts, and long-term strategies."

Prior to traveling to Ferguson, Folayan worked with formerly incarcerated people, conducting interviews she has described as having a major influence on her approach to storytelling. Folayan has also cited Jehane Noujaim's film The Square, which depicts the 2011 Egyptian Revolution at Tahrir Square, as a significant influence on Whose Streets?

Folayan directed the inaugural episode of Get Schooled, Glamour Magazine's video series on girls overcoming major hurdles in pursuit of education; she interviewed Kylie, a teenager from Ottawa, Kansas.

=== Awards and accolades ===
In developing Whose Streets?, Folayan was selected for the Sundance Documentary Edit and Story Lab, its Music & Sound Design Lab: Documentary, and its Creative Producing Summit. She also won support from the MacArthur Foundation, the Ford Foundation, and the Tribeca Film Institute.

In 2016, Folayan was named one of Filmmaker Magazine's Twenty Five New Faces of Independent Film and Independent Magazine's 10 Filmmakers to Watch.

In 2017, Folayan was named the Vimeo Share the Screen Fellow at IFP's Made in NY Media Center.
