= Damon Davis =

American artist, musician, filmmaker

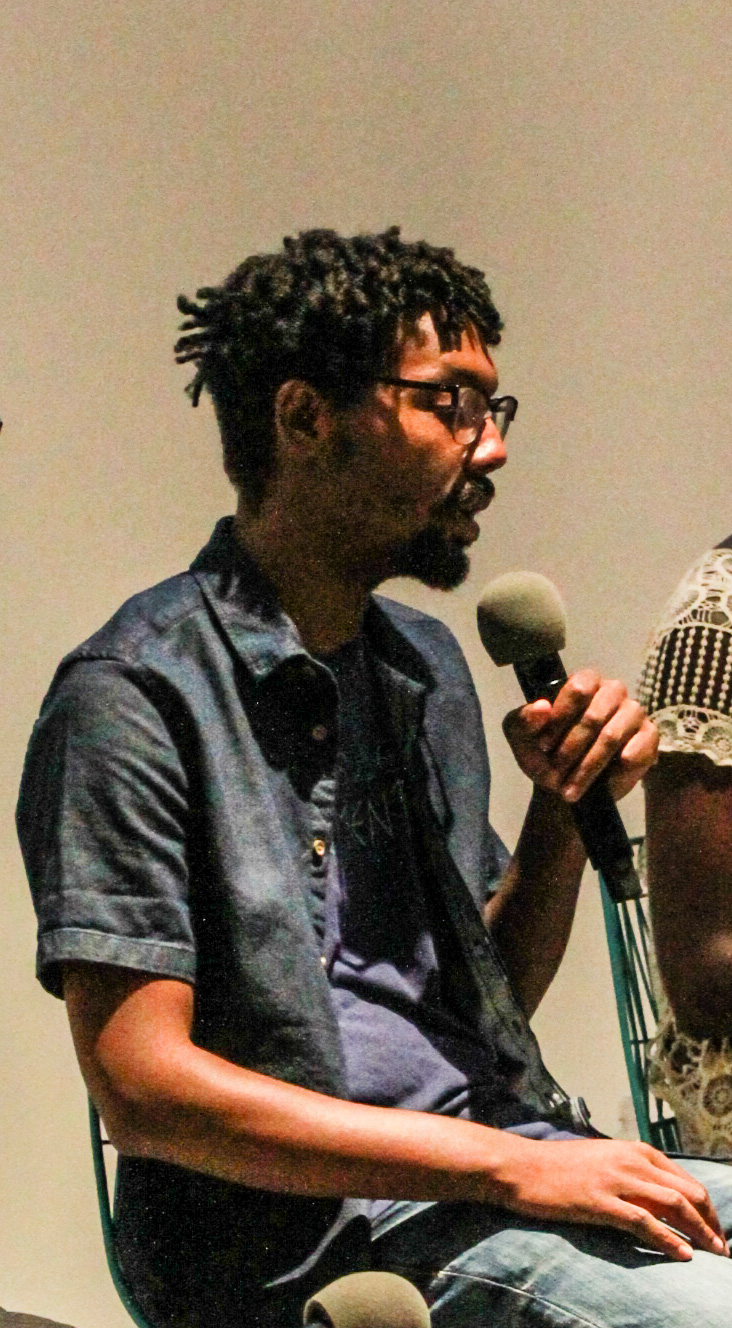
- Davis at a screening for Whose Streets?, July 2017
- Born: 1985 (age 40–41)
- Education: St. Louis University
- Occupations: Artist, musician, filmmaker
- Organization: Far-Fetched
- Notable work: "All Hands on Deck"; Whose Streets?
- Website: heartacheandpaint.com

Damon Davis (born 1985) is a multi-media American artist, musician and filmmaker based in St. Louis, Missouri. His 2014 public art installation "All Hands on Deck" has been collected in the National Museum of African American History and Culture. He is also a founder of Far-Fetched, a St. Louis–based artist collective, and co-director of Whose Streets?, a documentary on the Ferguson unrest following police officer Darren Wilson's fatal shooting of Michael Brown. The film premiered at the Sundance Film Festival in 2017.

== Early life ==
The child of a sharecropper (his mother) and a Black Panther (his father), Davis grew up in East St. Louis. He attended St. Louis University, initially majoring in fine arts but graduating with a degree in communications.

== Career ==
Davis has worked as a professional artist since 2010.

=== Music ===
Davis formed the hiphop duo Scriptz 'N Screwz in 2011, in which he participated using the stage name LooseScrewz. He next founded artist collective and record label Far-Fetched, in 2013 releasing an album eklektrip with collaborator Corey Williams (stage name Thelonius Kryptonite). In 2016, Davis began releasing music under his own name, with a three-part album cycle focused on Afrofuturist themes, including science fiction, Creole mysticism and "alternative blackness", in his words.

=== "All Hands on Deck" ===
In Ferguson, Missouri in 2014, while awaiting the grand jury decision on whether to indict police officer Darren Wilson for fatally shooting Michael Brown, Davis created a public art project on storefronts boarded up in anticipation of unrest. Working with store owners, he wheatpasted the plywood-covered windows of participating stores with a series of posters developed from his photographs of hands in the "hands up" gesture Brown was allegedly making when Wilson shot him. Davis described the project at aiming to create "something visually appealing, just to give the people hope, and let them know we stand with them." Mic called the project "the most powerful street art in America."

In 2016, the Museum of Contemporary Art San Diego showed the photographs from the project in an exhibit called "Damon Davis: All Hands on Deck." An original window board from the Ferguson installation is part of the permanent collection at the National Museum of African American History and Culture.

=== Whose Streets? ===
With Sabaah Folayan, Davis co-directed Whose Streets?, a documentary about the Ferguson uprising following the killing of Michael Brown. The film premiered in competition at the 2017 Sundance Film Festival as a Day One screening, where it received favorable reviews from critics. In a five-star review in The Guardian, Jordan Hoffman praised Folayan and Davis's "tremendous end run around mainstream news outlets and the agenda-driven narratives that emerge, particularly on television" in the directors' choice not to use "images...leaked by law enforcement or stage managed for the media, but [which] come directly from the people who lived through the violent events of 2014." On February 7, 2017, Magnolia Pictures purchased the film for theatrical distribution, with plans for a summer release on the anniversary of Brown's death. The film will be released on August 11, 2017.

Davis's previous filmmaking included a 2008 documentary called Borrowed Time.

=== Accolades ===
In 2016, he was named one of Filmmaker Magazine's Twenty Five New Faces of Independent Film and Independent Magazine's 10 Filmmakers to Watch.
