= John Lewis: Good Trouble =

2020 documentary by Dawn Porter

- Film poster
- Directed by: Dawn Porter
- Produced by: Laura Michalchyshyn; Dawn Porter; Erika Alexander; Ben Arnon
- Cinematography: Tony Hardmon; Keith Walker; Stefan Wiesen
- Edited by: Jessica Congdon
- Music by: Tamar-kali
- Production companies: Participant; CNN Films; AGC Studios; TIME Studios
- Distributed by: Magnolia Pictures
- Release dates: June 19, 2020 (Tulsa); July 3, 2020 (United States)
- Running time: 96 minutes
- Country: United States
- Language: English

John Lewis: Good Trouble is a 2020 American documentary film directed by Dawn Porter about the life of civil rights activist and United States congressman John Lewis.

The film was produced by CNN Films, AGC Studios and TIME Studios. It premiered in Tulsa, Oklahoma on June 19, 2020, and was released by Magnolia Pictures and Participant in the United States on July 3, 2020.

== Release ==
John Lewis: Good Trouble premiered at the Circle Cinema theater in Tulsa, Oklahoma, on June 19, 2020. The date and place were chosen to commemorate Juneteenth, the celebration of the emancipation of slaves in the United States, and to protest against a Donald Trump presidential re-election campaign rally planned in Tulsa for the same day; the rally was rescheduled for the following day after widespread criticism. The film was originally scheduled to premiere in April 2020 at the Tribeca Film Festival, before the festival was canceled due to the COVID-19 pandemic.

Magnolia Pictures and Participant released the film in the United States in select theaters and on video on demand services on July 3, 2020.

Lewis died shortly after the film was released. After his death, Apple, Inc. announced that it would donated all proceeds it received from the film to the National Civil Rights Museum and the National Museum of African American History and Culture.

== Reception ==
On the review aggregation website Rotten Tomatoes, the film holds an approval rating of 94% based on 71 reviews, with an average rating of 7.3/10. The website's critical consensus reads, "It's far more conventional than the life it honors, but John Lewis: Good Trouble remains a worthy tribute to an inspiring activist and public servant." On Metacritic, the film has a weighted average score of 70 out of 100 based on 19 critic reviews, indicating "generally favorable" reviews.

Ben Kenisberg, writing for The New York Times, said that "John Lewis surely requires no introduction", but the film "provides a solid one anyway, striking a good balance between revisiting Lewis’s most famous work as an activist and chronicling his life today". He concluded: "Although the film uses a conventional format, it makes an urgent argument: that a new wave of voter suppression has threatened the rights that Lewis labored to secure."

Brian Lowry, writing for CNN, described the film as a "fitting if slightly disjointed tribute", and said that the film is "somehow both timely and timeless in honoring a man who has spent his entire adult life in the public arena", but added that it "hopscotches around a bit too much, jumping back and forth in time -- a byproduct, perhaps, of the volume of ground there is to cover". He concluded: "Lewis -- who is battling pancreatic cancer -- was not much more than a kid when he marched alongside Martin Luther King Jr., and has seemingly lived three lives since then. That's why despite the documentary's uneven aspects, his legacy is ample motivation for any student of history to see "Good Trouble" as a good investment."

Vikram Murthi, writing for The A.V. Club, was more critical in his review of the film, giving it a grade of C. He wrote: "That everyone, from voters to fellow politicians, loves John Lewis may be the only salient takeaway from the scattered, by-the-numbers documentary John Lewis: Good Trouble", and added: "It’s no surprise that Good Trouble, a tribute to a secular saint, incorporates some hagiographic elements ... What’s stranger is how Porter will sporadically acknowledge criticism of Lewis or cover less flattering periods in his career, then undercut them with affecting footage or good publicity." He concluded that the film is "an uneven paean to a man who deserves a more complicated portrait."

== See also ==
- Civil rights movement in popular culture
