= Whose Streets? =

- Theatrical release poster
- Directed by: Sabaah Folayan; Damon Davis (co-director)
- Produced by: Sabaah Folayan; Damon Davis; Sabaah Jordan; Jennifer MacArthur; Flannery Miller; Chris Renteria
- Cinematography: Lucas Alvarado Farrar
- Edited by: Christopher McNabb
- Distributed by: Magnolia Pictures
- Release date: August 11, 2017
- Running time: 103 minutes
- Country: United States
- Language: English

Whose Streets? is a 2017 American documentary film about the killing of Michael Brown and the Ferguson uprising. Directed by Sabaah Folayan and co-directed by Damon Davis, Whose Streets? premiered in competition at the 2017 Sundance Film Festival, then was released theatrically in August, 2017, for the anniversary of Brown's death. It was a nominee for Critics' Choice and Gotham Independent Film awards.

== Development ==
Folayan, Davis and their cinematographer Lucas Alvarado Farrar (who had been one of Folayan's college classmates at Columbia University) began work on the project in 2014 when Folayan and Farrar traveled to Ferguson, Missouri during the protests and riots that followed police officer Darren Wilson's killing of Michael Brown. Davis, a St. Louis-based artist, was already at work documenting the events. Folayan expected to do so via print journalism, but was quickly struck by a sharp contrast between the depictions appearing in the newsmedia and what she was experiencing in person. Feeling "we couldn't keep up with the news cycle and maintain justice to what we were seeing", she decided instead to pursue a film project.

The project was selected for production support in a series of Sundance Institute programs: the Documentary Edit and Story Lab, its Music & Sound Design Lab: Documentary, and its Creative Producing Summit. It also won support from the MacArthur Foundation, the Ford Foundation, and the Tribeca Film Institute.

== Synopsis ==
The documentary film focuses on seven main characters, particularly Hands Up United's co-founder Tory Russell, Brittany Ferrell, a nurse and young mother, and David Whitt, a recruiter for civilian organization Cop Watch.

== Premiere, acquisition, and theatrical release ==
Whose Streets? premiered in competition at the 2017 Sundance Film Festival as a Day One film.

In February 2017, Magnolia Pictures acquired the film for distribution, planning a summer release for the third anniversary of Michael Brown's death. The film opened August 11, 2017.

== Critical reception ==
The film received strongly positive reviews, holding a score of 79 out of 100 on Metacritic (indicating "Generally favorable reviews") and a 98% approval rating among critics on Rotten Tomatoes. Reviewing the film at IndieWire, Jude Dry wrote, "Raw and unadorned, Whose Streets? is a documentary in the truest sense of the word; an actual moving document of events fresh in the country's memory, but never before laid as bare as they are here." Anthony Lane of The New Yorker questioned why more police (for instance the black policewoman featured in what he called "the movie's most potent close-up") hadn't been among the film's interviewees, but most reviewers praised the film as a portrait of activism, like David Rooney of The Hollywood Reporter who described Whose Streets? as "an essential testament to the commitment of activists whose credo is 'We have nothing to lose but our chains,' told in their own fervent voices."

== Awards ==
Award	Date of ceremony	Category	Recipient(s) and nominee(s)	Result	Ref.
Gotham Independent Film Awards	November 27, 2017	Best Documentary	Whose Streets?	Nominated	
Critics' Choice Movie Awards	November 2, 2017	Best First Documentary	Whose Streets?	Nominated	
