= Colton Moore =

American politician (born 1993)

- Official portrait, 2023

Member of the Georgia State Senate from the 53rd district
- In office January 9, 2023 – January 13, 2026
- Preceded by: Jeff Mullis
- Succeeded by: Lanny Thomas

Member of the Georgia House of Representatives from the 1st district
- In office January 14, 2019 – January 14, 2021
- Preceded by: John Deffenbaugh
- Succeeded by: Mike Cameron

Personal details
- Born: Colton Chase Moore; October 10, 1993 (age 33) Trenton, Georgia, U.S.
- Party: Republican
- Spouse: Hailey Ann Smith (2025)
- Education: University of Georgia (BA)
- Website: Campaign website

Colton Chase Moore (born October 10, 1993) is an American politician who represented the 53rd district in the Georgia State Senate from 2023 to 2026. He previously represented the 1st district in the Georgia House of Representatives from 2019 to 2021.

Moore was first elected to the Georgia House in 2018 after defeating incumbent John Deffenbaugh in the Republican primary with 67% of the vote. He unsuccessfully ran for Georgia Senate in 2020, unsuccessfully challenging incumbent Republican Jeff Mullis in the primary, but was later elected to the seat in 2022 after Mullis chose not to seek re-election. Moore was re-elected in 2024. Moore resigned in 2026 to unsuccessfully run in that year's special election for Georgia's 14th congressional district.

On September 28, 2023, the Georgia Senate Republican Caucus indefinitely suspended Moore after he was accused of publicly using false statements against fellow caucus members. He was banned from the House floor in March 2024 after criticizing the late House Speaker David Ralston during a day of remembrance for him.

== Personal life ==
=== Early life and education ===
Moore was born and raised on his family farm in Dade County, Georgia, where he resides today. As a child, Moore said he "idolized Teddy Roosevelt, seeing him as a figure who acted quickly and boldly". In high school, Moore was the state president of Georgia Future Business Leaders of America under Executive Director Monty Rhodes from March 2011 to March 2012. During that time he led an organization having more than 25,000 students and 320 advisers.

At age 18, Moore became a commercial truck driver, and started auctioneering while studying at the University of Georgia. While in college, Moore served as co-chair of the American Israel Public Affairs Committee chapter of the university and attended multiple policy conferences hosted by the committee. In 2016, Moore graduated from the University of Georgia with a double bachelors in political science and international affairs.

=== Marriage ===
In 2025, Moore married Hailey Ann Smith.

== Electoral history ==
=== Georgia House of Representatives campaign and election ===
Nineteen months after graduating college, Moore, then 24, qualified to run against incumbent John Deffenbaugh in the House race for District 1. Moore's budget was just $3,500 and completely self funded, a tenth of Deffenbaugh's campaign spending. With no declared Democratic opponent, Republican Moore was elected as the presumptive District 1 state representative on May 22, 2018, after defeating John Deffenbaugh by a margin of 326 votes with a final tally of 2,184 to 1,858.

=== Georgia State Senate campaigns and elections ===
In March 2020, Moore told the press that he would not be running for reelection for his house seat. Moore instead qualified to run for the State Senate seat for District 53 against Jeff Mullis.

In April 2020, Moore asked Senator Jeff Mullis to debate him in Dade County. Mullis refused, claiming to not wish to participate in a forum controlled by Moore.

Moore was endorsed by Young Americans for Liberty in 2020.

On June 9, 2020, Moore lost the Republican primary election to Mullis. Mullis was later re-elected in November, running uncontested.

Moore later launched his campaign for senator for the 2022 election, again running for Jeff Mullis's seat. In March 2022, Mullis announced he would withdraw from the election following medical issues, claiming he wished to spend more time with his family. Moore later won the Republican primary on May 24, 2022, with 51% of the vote against political newcomer Steven Henry. He was unopposed in the general election on November 8, 2022 and elected to the 53rd senate district.

On May 21, 2024, Moore won the Republican primary election for state senator with 70% of the vote against newcomer Angela Pence (29.8%). Moore utilized $274,000 in campaign donations while Pence utilized $3,600. Moore was challenged by Democrat Bart Bryant in the 2024 election. On November 5, 2024, Moore won the general election.

=== State senate resignation and 14th district congressional election ===
On January 14, 2026, Moore resigned from the senate to run in a special election to fill the 14th district congressional seat vacated by Republican Marjorie Taylor Greene. He did not obtain enough votes in the March 10, 2026, special election to enter the April 7, 2026, runoff for the 14th district that was won by Republican Clay Fuller.

== Policy and legislation ==
In 2019 Moore was rated by American Conservative Union as the seventh most conservative legislator in Georgia. He has supported and cosigned bills such as HB 2, HB 481, and the "Heartbeat Bill"; supported 10-year term limits; advocated for the end of film subsidies; and supported HB 179 (died in committee) "which would allow school teachers and administrators to utilize discipline in schools without having it negatively impact their school's climate ratings".

Moore is a vocal supporter of Israel, advocating for stronger relations between Israel and the United States. In 2022, Moore stated, "there is no Palestinian land, it is all the land of Israel" and served as a leader of the AIPAC chapter of the University of Georgia as a student.

=== House Resolution 328 ===
In 2019, Moore was among ten representatives who signed House Resolution 328, calling for Georgia House Speaker David Ralston to resign due to his alleged abuse of power and unethical behavior. Ralston, an attorney, leveraged his position as Speaker of the House to postpone his cases more than 900 times. Among Ralston's clients were accused molesters, rapists, and individuals that were accused of committing a violent crime. They confessed that they retained Ralston as their attorney because he could leverage his position in their favor to indefinitely postpone cases. David Shell, a man who has beaten many women, including having been charged by a grand jury as a repeat offender, told the Atlanta Journal-Constitution: "That's why I gave him 20,000 bucks… He's worth every penny of it". Moore wrote a letter to Speaker Ralston that read, "While legislative continuance is a right all legislators have access to, your use of this right has resulted in an unjust delay of violent criminal cases in our state… District 1 and many citizens across our great state believe you should no longer serve as the leader of Georgia's largest governing body".

=== Opposition to judicial complex renaming ===
In February 2019, Moore was one of two dissenting votes against naming the judicial complex after former Governor Nathan Deal. Moore said that it was not right for Deal to be "the symbol of justice in Georgia", as his reforms were "insufficient". Moore went on to write a memorandum to Kemp, listing the reasons why it would be an inappropriate choice to name the new judicial center after Deal.

== Controversies ==
=== Efforts to overturn the 2020 presidential election results ===
After the 2020 United States presidential election, Moore publicly called for all of Georgia's votes to be disregarded due to "treasonous allegations," and for Georgia's electoral votes to instead be chosen by himself and the other members of the state's general assembly.

=== Warnings of civil war ===
On August 29, 2023 while appearing on Steve Bannon's "War Room" podcast, Moore said that his constituents could be "fighting in the streets" if Fulton County District Attorney Fani Willis is not prevented from prosecuting former president Donald Trump and his 18 alleged co-conspirators for violations of Georgia's RICO statute and other offenses connected with the attempts to reverse the outcome of the 2020 presidential election. While recalling a conversation with another senator, Moore stated "I don't want a civil war, I don't want to have to draw my rifle." He also suggested that Georgia Republicans "have the legislative authority to call in the state troopers and bring [the Georgia State prosecutors] in."

=== Suspension by Georgia Senate Republican Caucus ===
On September 28, 2023, the Georgia Senate Republican Caucus indefinitely suspended Moore, after he was accused of publicly using false statements against fellow caucus members. In a letter to Governor Kemp, Moore called for an emergency session to investigate Fulton County District Attorney Fani Willis, who had indicted Donald Trump and 18 other people on felony charges. Moore said he had the support of 3/5 of both the Senate and House (required to investigate Willis). Governor Kemp's office later stated that Moore "has not provided evidence that he has the necessary support to call a special session". Moore later pleaded that he needed more of his colleagues to sign his petition. After Moore's assertions, Kemp called the move "political theater" and "some grifter scam that [Moore] is doing to help them raise a few dollars on their campaign account."

After the refusal of Republican lawmakers to investigate Willis, Moore made hostile statements against them. The caucus later issued a statement, saying "Moore has a right to his own opinion. However, during his advocacy for his ill-conceived proposal, Senator Moore has knowingly misled people across Georgia and our nation, causing unnecessary tension and hostility, while putting his caucus colleagues and their families at risk of personal harm".

At least two Republican lawmakers reported receiving online threats after refusing to launch an investigation into Willis.

Moore replied, "The Georgia RINOs responded to my call to fight back against the Trump witch hunts by acting like children and throwing me out of the caucus".

=== Exile from the Georgia House of Representatives ===
On March 14, 2024, Moore was banned from the House floor after criticizing late Speaker David Ralston in the Senate chamber. After remarks by Governor Kemp and former Governor Deal in honor of Ralston, who died in 2022, Moore spoke on the Senate floor, accusing the Georgia Assembly of memorializing "one of the most corrupt Georgia leaders we'll ever see in our lifetimes." After Moore's speech, Lieutenant Governor Burt Jones cut Moore off, and President Pro Tempore John Kennedy apologized to Ralston's family on the Senate balcony.

Moore's comments were based on journalistic revelations that Ralston had allegedly used his office for significant financial benefit. Journalists found that over the course of 21 cases, Ralston requested delays 57 times, and that on 76 of the 93 conflicting days, the legislature was not in session; he would commonly delay individual cases over a dozen times each. Charges against Ralston's clients who benefited from this include drunk driving, child molestation, and assault. Some of Ralston's clients retained him specifically for these reasons.

The comments were criticized by senators of both parties, including Republican Tim Bearden and Democrat Josh McLaurin. Speaker Jon Burns later denounced Moore's remarks, saying they were "some of the vilest you can say about a good man." Moore was then barred from entering the House floor. The decision was met with applause and a standing ovation by the House. Moore was the sole vote against the resolution to rename a University of North Georgia building after Ralston.

=== Arrest ===
On January 15, 2025, Moore posted on social media that he would ignore his ban from the House, citing his duty under the Georgia Constitution to attend a joint session of the legislature to hear the State of the State address. Moore followed through on his warning on January 16, 2025, when he attempted to enter the House floor to attend the State of the State address by Governor Brian Kemp. He was blocked from entering the House floor by staff and police, attempted to push past officers to enter, was pushed to the floor after a scuffle, and was led away in handcuffs. Moore stated his rights were denied and that he had "more authority than the doorkeeper of the House".

Moore was arrested and booked into the Fulton County Jail. He was charged with willful obstruction of law-enforcement officers.

The arrest of Moore was met with strong criticism. Many labeled the arrest as unconstitutional and tyrannical, saying Moore could not perform his job following Burns' order. Jackie Harling, a member of Walker County, likened the conflict to a "silly schoolyard fight".

Speaker Jon G. Burns stood by his decision, stating he would uphold the ban until Moore delivered a "sincere apology to the family, extended family, and loved ones of former Speaker David Ralston from the floor of the Senate." Lt. Governor Burt Jones defended Moore's right to attend the session stating "Whatever personal differences Senator Moore has with others, he is a member of the body over which I preside. All elected 56 senators and 180 representatives deserve the opportunity to fulfill their responsibility to attend joint sessions of the General Assembly. There is real work to be done this session and the focus should be on delivering for the people of Georgia instead of personal grievances and egos."

Jones reiterated his defense of Moore the next day, stating that he had discussed the situation with Speaker Burns, and that it would not be repeated "on my watch." Jones defended the rights of Moore and senators in his remarks. Burns confirmed that Moore would be permitted in future joint sessions of the legislature.

Moore later filed an application in Fulton County Magistrate Court for an arrest warrant against one of the House staffers who prevented him from entering the House floor, saying that the staffer had committed felonies. His application was denied by the judge.
