= Mug shot of Donald Trump =

2023 police booking photograph of U.S. President

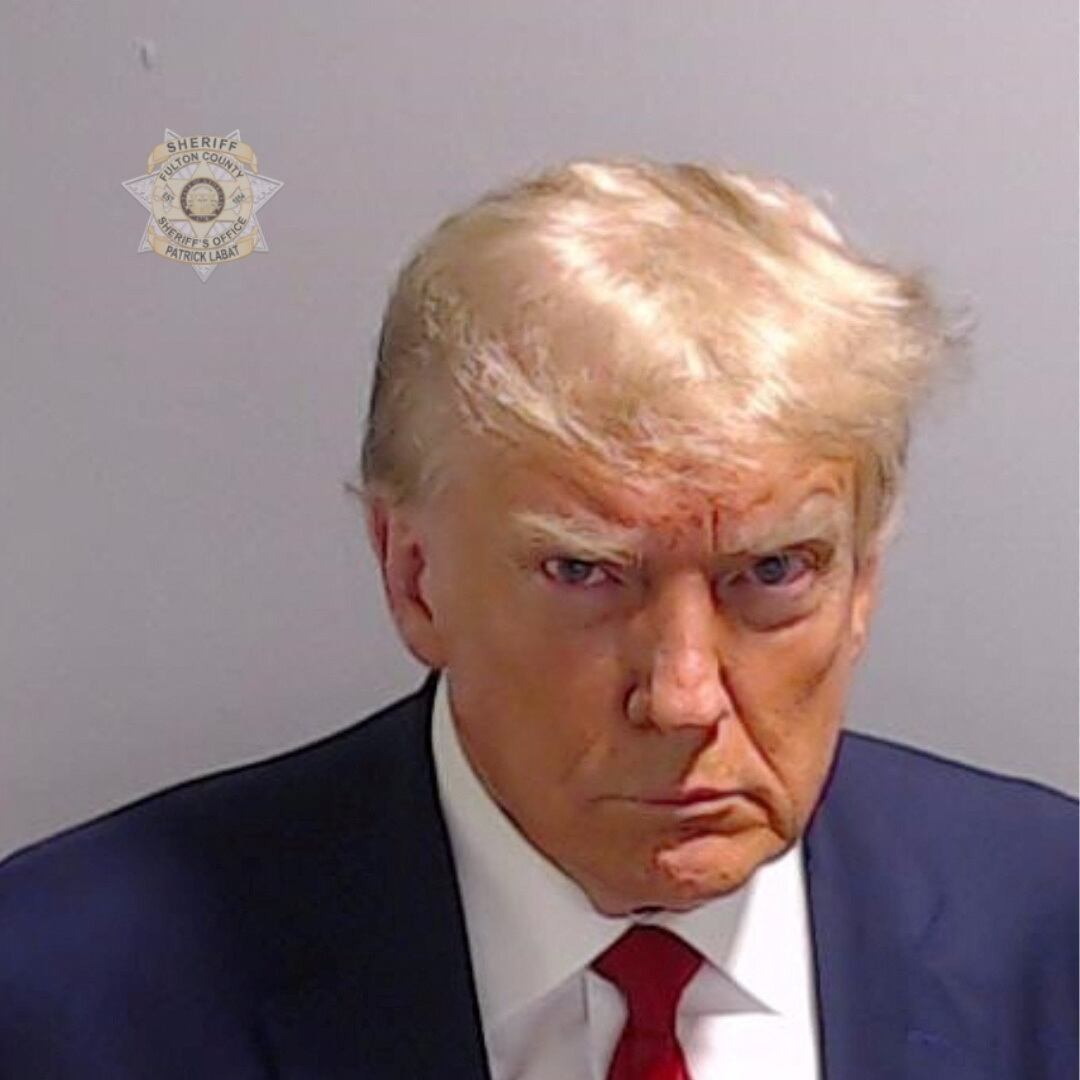
- Trump's booking photograph released by the Fulton County, Georgia, sheriff's office
- Completion date: August 24, 2023
- Medium: Photograph
- Subject: Donald Trump
- Location: Atlanta, Georgia, U.S.

On August 24, 2023, a mug shot of Donald Trump, then a former president of the United States who went on to win the 2024 presidential election, was taken at the Fulton County Jail in Atlanta, Georgia. The mug shot was taken after Trump was indicted on racketeering and related charges, and voluntarily surrendered himself to authorities at the Fulton County Jail. In the photograph, Trump, wearing a blue suit with a white shirt and a red tie, glowers at the camera in front of a gray backdrop. His face is lit from the side and from above. It is the first and thus far only police booking photograph of a U.S. president. After its publication, the mug shot was used on merchandise by the Trump 2024 presidential campaign, in Internet memes, and featured on various media reports worldwide. Since 2025, it has also been on display at an entrance to the Oval Office.

== Background ==
On August 14, 2023, a grand jury in Fulton County, Georgia, indicted Trump on charges of election racketeering and related offenses, and issued an arrest warrant. The county's district attorney Fani Willis offered him the option to surrender voluntarily. Shortly after 19:30 Eastern Daylight Time (EDT), August 24, Trump turned himself in at the Fulton County Jail in Atlanta, Georgia and was booked, given inmate number P01135809, processed and released on bond. At 20:05 EDT, a copy of the booking photograph without the Fulton County Jail watermark was posted on Twitter. CNN released the official image at 21:27.

At 21:38, Trump posted the photograph to X with the text "MUG SHOT - AUGUST 24, 2023, ELECTION INTERFERENCE, NEVER SURRENDER!" The post contained a link to a WinRed page soliciting contributions for his 2024 presidential campaign. The post was the first instance of Trump's activity on Twitter since his account was reinstated in November 2022 by Elon Musk following his acquisition of the platform.

== Usage ==
=== Fundraising ===
Before Trump's arraignment in April 2023 in New York City, his daughter-in-law, Lara Trump, said that any mug shot of Trump would "go down in history as the most famous mug shot ever to exist in America". Ex-Trump spokesman Hogan Gidley joked that such a photograph would be the "most manly, most masculine, most handsome mug shot of all time". No booking photograph was taken during the arraignment, and Trump's campaign website began selling T-shirts featuring a pretend mug shot.

Ninety minutes after Trump's release from the Fulton County Jail on August 24, the Trump campaign began selling T-shirts, mugs, and other merchandise with his booking photograph. On August 26, the campaign said it had raised $7.1 million since the release of the photo. The Lincoln Project, sellers on Etsy, and others also began selling merchandise with the booking photo. Despite the photo being public domain under Georgia law, the Trump campaign threatened to sue any user who did not obtain their prior authorization.

=== Monetization ===
In December 2023, Trump launched a set of digital trading cards as non-fungible tokens (NFTs), which he labeled the "Mugshot Edition". 100,000 digital cards were released at a price of $99 each. Customers who purchased 47 or more digital trading cards would receive one of 2,042 limited edition physical trading cards, 25 of which are hand-signed by Trump, along with a piece of the suit that he wore in the Fulton County Jail for the mug shot, and an invitation to dine with Trump at Mar-a-Lago. The first 200 customers who purchased at least 100 cards would receive a unique NFT, two tickets to a cocktail reception with Trump, a second physical card with pieces of Trump's suit and tie, and two additional commemorative cards.

=== News coverage ===
Many newspapers in the United States and other countries featured the mug shot "splashed across" or in articles on the front page of their print issues while others printed teasers with thumbnails of the booking photograph on the front page. Other news outlets reported on the reporting. Fox News featured the mug shot in an article on an exclusive interview Trump gave them soon after his release from jail. They cited him as saying that "officials in Georgia 'insisted' on a mugshot" and that he "agreed to do that".

=== In the White House ===
During the second presidency of Donald Trump an issue of the New York Post featuring the mug shot on its front cover was hung in a golden frame in a hallway just outside the Oval Office. One of the earliest photographs showing the framed cover was taken on February 4, 2025 during a visit by Israeli prime minister Benjamin Netanyahu.

== Reactions ==
Trump's 2025 inaugural portrait was inspired by the mug shot

The Associated Press called it "an American moment" and an "enduring image that will appear in history books long after Donald Trump is gone". They described the image as Trump glaring at the camera defiantly, as if he was "staring down a nemesis through the lens". The Guardian's Chris McGreal referred to it as the defining mug shot of the decade, and one that defines modern U.S. politics. He noted, "Trump's hostility shines through as he turns his eyes up toward the camera above him and in his taut, downturned mouth ... Dressed in a blue suit, white shirt and red tie, he makes no attempt to put on a smile like some of his co-defendants in their mugshots. The picture does not flatter but it does convey the message many of Trump's supporters want to hear—belligerence".

The New York Times fashion critic Vanessa Friedman called the image "a mug shot for history that is unprecedented" and noted that "his face is lit from above by a blinding white flash that hits his ash blond hair like a spotlight. ... He glowers out from beneath his brows, unsmiling, eyes rendered oddly bloodshot, brow furrowed, chin tucked in, as if he is about to head-butt the camera. The image is stark, shorn of the flags and fancy that have been Mr. Trump's preferred framings for photo ops at Mar-a-Lago or Trump Tower, or during his term in office, and that communicate power and the gilded glow of success". Friedman quoted historian Sean Wilentz as saying that, of the myriad of photos of Trump, it could be the most famous or notorious and serve as "the ultimate bookend to a political arc in the United States that began decades ago, with Richard Nixon's 'I am not a crook.'"

CNN called the image "one of the most iconic images of anyone who served as commander in chief" and "stark in its simplicity in a way that must surely grate for an ex-reality star for whom image is everything". The Independent observed that "the 45th president glowers straight into the camera, brow furrowed and sizable bushy eyebrows lowered as he faces his fate", adding "it is an undeniable fact that Trump's mug shot is both historically and culturally significant—and soon to be seen everywhere, forever".

The Telegraph stated, "The 45th president is pictured striking a hostile pose, with his eyebrows contracted, lips pursed and a menacing scowl on his face. His head and the top of his shoulders are visible in what is likely to become a world-famous image". Time commented, "His platinum blonde [sic] cotton candy wisp of hair shimmering in the harsh jailhouse lighting. His eyes locked in a hard stare. His mouth flattened in a grimace. Instead of smiling like some of his co-defendants, he appears to be scowling". BBC News referred to the composition of the picture as a "photographer's nightmare".

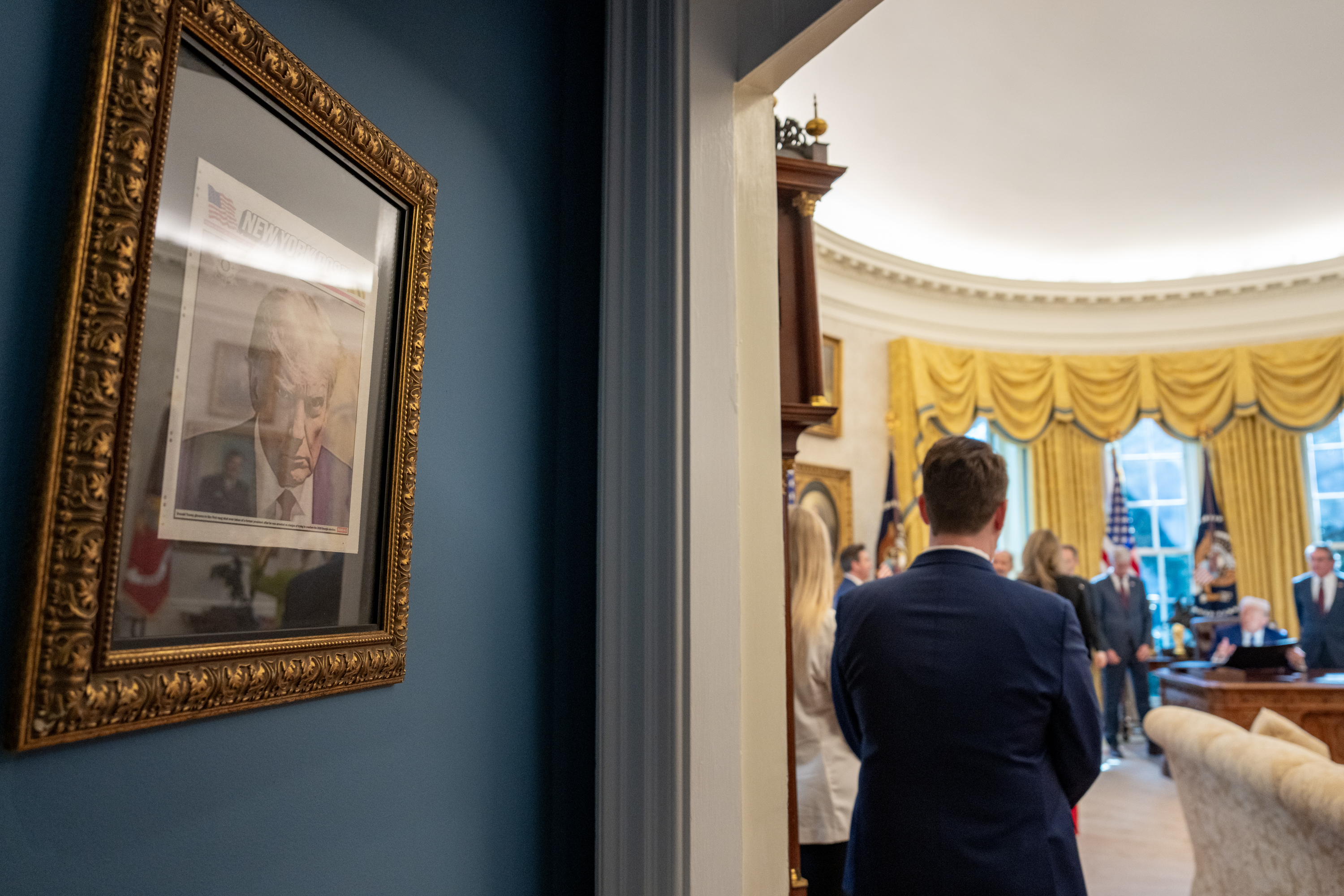
Trump's mug shot hanging outside the Oval Office in February 2025

British film critic Robbie Collin likened Trump's expression to the "Kubrick stare", emblematic of several memorable characters of American filmmaker Stanley Kubrick's films. In Internet memes and commentary, the booking photograph was also said to imitate character Vigo the Cruel's "menacing stare featured prominently in Ghostbusters II", as well as the eponymous character's "blue steel" pose in the movie Zoolander (Trump himself made a cameo appearance in the latter).

Columnist Maureen Dowd of The New York Times observed that "the Picture of Donald Trump should have been a 'foul parody,' a reflection of what the chancer has done with his life. It should have shown Trump's corroding soul rather than his truculent face. It should have revealed a man so cynical and depraved that he is willing to smash our nation’s soul—our democracy—and destroy faith in our institutions. All this simply to avoid being called a loser". On August 27, art critic Jerry Saltz called the mug shot "the most famous photograph in the world" and that "[a]lready the man with the scowl is using his portrait as both a statement of defiance and a claim of persecution—a symbol as diabolically ingenious as the red MAGA hat".

When asked by a journalist for his opinion of the photograph, then-president Joe Biden quipped "Handsome guy, wonderful guy." On February 23, 2024, Trump was criticized for comments during a campaign speech for saying his four criminal indictments and mug shot boosted his appeal among black voters and for comparing his legal jeopardy to historical anti-black discrimination, stating that "when I did the mug shot in Atlanta, that mug shot is No. 1. You know who embraced it more than anyone else? The Black population."

After being named Time's person of the year 2024, Trump humorously posted a meme with his mug shot below the text "How it started" next to his Time front cover below "How it's going". On January 17, 2025, three days before inauguration day, the Trump transition team released inaugural portraits of Trump and vice president-elect JD Vance. Whereas Vance smiled on his, Trump's expression was reportedly inspired by his 2023 mug shot.

== See also ==
- Donald Trump raised-fist photographs
- List of photographs considered the most important
- List of United States presidential firsts
- Public image of Donald Trump
