= Official portraits of Donald Trump =

As of 2025, Donald Trump, the 45th and 47th president of the United States, has been the subject of five official portraits, three of which were official presidential portraits for his first and second presidencies released in 2017, 2025, and 2026, and two of which were inaugural portraits for his first and second presidencies released in 2016 and 2025 which served as "placeholder" official portraits until the release of the official portraits.

The contemporary tradition of official presidential photographs dates back to Gerald Ford's 1974 portrait; all presidents since have been depicted smiling with a flag of the United States in the background in at least one official portrait.

Trump's first portrait was taken in December 2016 by an unnamed staff member, ahead of Trump's first inauguration in January 2017. The portrait was used as a placeholder official portrait until October 2017, when the White House Office released official portraits of Trump and Vice President Mike Pence, taken by Shealah Craighead, then the chief White House photographer. In this portrait, Trump is standing in the Oval Office with an American flag in the background and smiling broadly at the camera.

Before Trump's second inauguration in January 2025, official portraits of him and Vice President-elect JD Vance were taken and released by Daniel Torok, who became Trump's second chief White House photographer. Trump's portrait is more harshly lit than previous photographs, with a stern facial expression modeled after his appearance in his 2023 mugshot. Another official portrait, taken by Torok, was released in June 2025, featuring Trump on an empty, dark background staring at the camera with a more neutral expression. Another photo was taken in 2026 in the Oval Office, at the Resolute desk.

== Background ==
Official photographic portraits have been taken of every president of the United States since the American Civil War. Unlike a president's traditional painted portrait, their official photograph is used for everyday functions. Official photographs are printed by the U.S. Government Publishing Office, and are displayed at American federal government buildings, U.S. embassies, and points of entry to the United States. Since the Lansdowne Portrait of George Washington, U.S. presidents have generally sought to appear relatable in their portraits while representing strong leadership and American national pride. Official presidential photographs are designed to communicate openness and affability.

Traditional photographic portraits portray presidents framed at a straight angle, from the chest upwards, lit with even, neutral lighting, and smiling broadly. After Richard Nixon, all presidents have been photographed smiling with exposed teeth, except for Barack Obama, who smiled with his mouth closed in his first presidential portrait. Prior to Gerald Ford in 1974, most presidents were photographed against a blank background. Beginning with Ford, presidents have often been photographed in front of a wall or a bookcase. All presidents since Ford have been shown standing in front of a flag of the United States.

Donald Trump became the 45th president of the United States in 2017 and the 47th in 2025. A former reality television star, Trump is famously conscious of his appearance and public image. In both 2016–17 and 2025, Trump was the subject of two official portraits, with one taken of him as president-elect and the other as president. Shealah Craighead, his chief official White House photographer during his first presidency, said that Trump is "very hands-on" with his portraits and often asks to see them "in real time so he can decide if it's headed in the right direction".

== 2016 inaugural portrait ==
Trump's first inaugural portrait, taken in December 2016 by an unnamed staff member

In December 2016, Trump released his official portrait as president-elect. No person has been credited with taking the photograph, which was added to the White House website upon Trump's inauguration on January 20, 2017. Trump also briefly used the portrait on Twitter as his profile picture on the official @POTUS account. In the portrait, Trump is wearing his characteristic red tie. The flag of the United States and the portico of the White House are visible in the background; Trump is standing in front of what appears to be a green-screen image of the White House. Trump has a serious expression, and is staring at the camera without smiling. Trump is leaning forwards, and appears to be illuminated from below.

Before an official presidential portrait of Trump was created to replace it, Trump's portrait as president-elect was used as a substitute in several federal buildings. In February 2017, the absence of an official portrait of Trump at a Department of Veterans Affairs hospital in West Palm Beach, Florida, led Republican Party congressman Brian Mast to help hang the placeholder photographs of Trump. Veterans Affairs staff later took down the photographs out of concern that they were not official, so David Shulkin, the Secretary of Veterans Affairs, ordered Veterans Affairs hospitals and clinics to download the same portrait from the White House website and hang it.

Michael Martinez, a professor of photojournalism at the University of Tennessee Knoxville and former photo editor for the Associated Press, said the portrait of Trump reinforced the intimidating image that he had created during his 2016 presidential campaign.

== 2017 presidential portrait ==
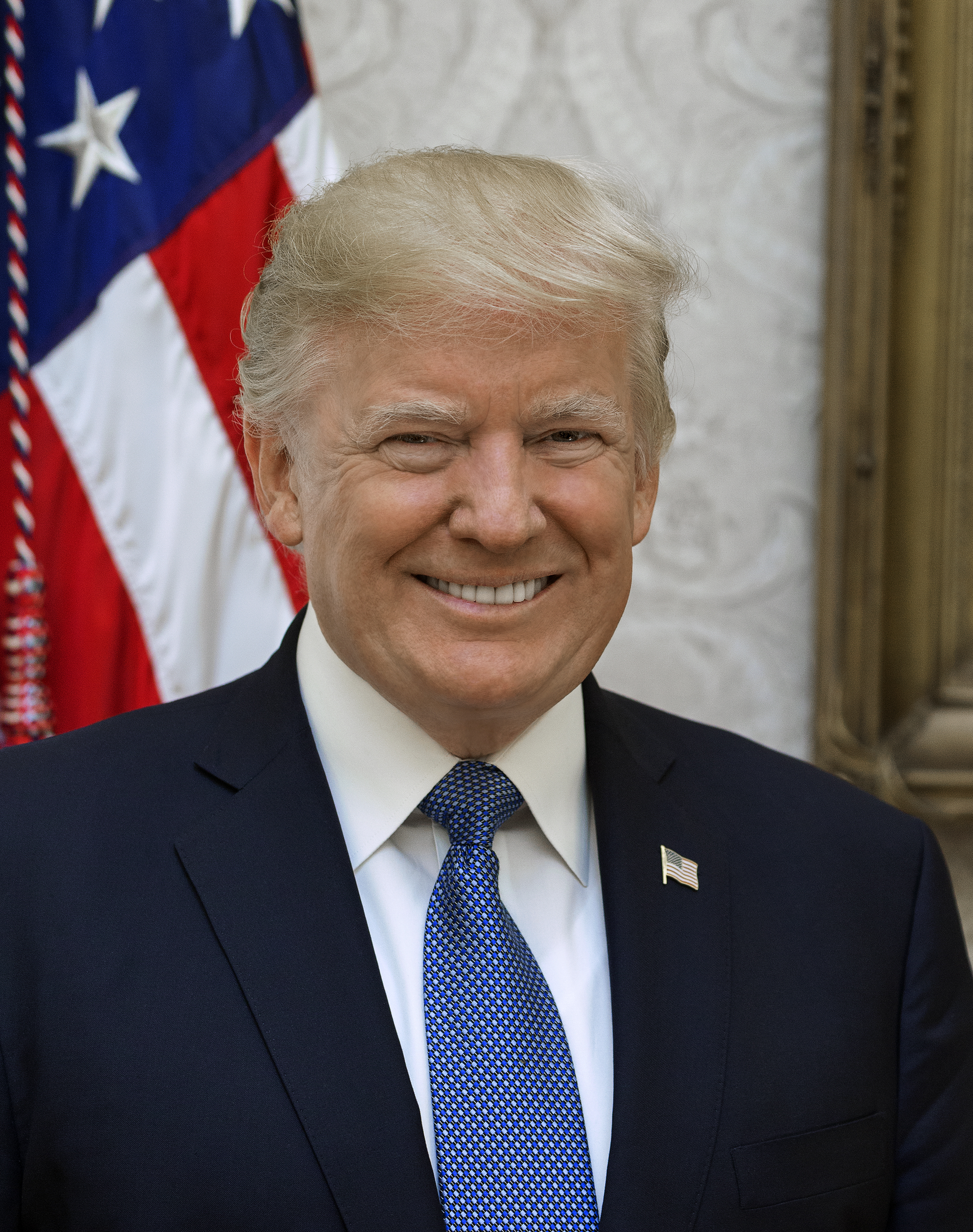
Trump's first presidential portrait, taken in October 2017 by Shealah Craighead

Over nine months after their inauguration, the White House revealed the official portraits of Trump and Vice President Mike Pence on October 31, 2017. The taking of the portraits was arranged hastily after months of delay; in September 2017, Trump and Pence had yet to decide when they would sit for their official portraits. The portraits were commissioned by the Government Publishing Office, and Trump was photographed by Shealah Craighead, the chief White House photographer. The White House said the portraits would be "distributed to federal facilities across the country and made available for sale to the public".

In his portrait, Trump is dressed in a white shirt and a blue or navy suit. He is wearing an American flag lapel pin, and a blue tie with a dotted pattern. Trump was photographed in the Oval Office, after a renovation of the office that was completed in August 2017. He is standing in front of an American flag. In the background is the Oval Office's gray damask print wallpaper, and a small piece of a golden picture frame that holds Rembrandt Peale's 1800 portrait of Thomas Jefferson. Trump is smiling broadly at the camera.

The room is evenly lit, with Trump brightly illuminated. He fills slightly less than half of the portrait's horizontal space, being shown at a traditional, level angle, and appearing slightly off-center. The portrait of Trump hewed closely to the historical style of portraits, being similarly composed to the official presidential portraits of George W. Bush and Barack Obama, and to the later portrait of Joe Biden. Trump's standard, smiling depiction was seen as a departure from his typical threatening persona; Craighead later said that Trump appeared to never particularly like the portrait.

== 2025 inaugural portrait ==
Trump's second inaugural portrait, taken in January 2025 by Daniel Torok

Several weeks prior to Trump's second inauguration, he and Vice President-elect JD Vance were photographed by Daniel Torok, who became Trump's chief White House photographer. Torok revealed the portraits on the social media website X (formerly Twitter) on January 15, 2025, and Trump's transition team released them the next day, ahead of the inauguration on January 20. Torok had roughly 20 minutes to take the photographs. The portraits were made specifically for the inauguration, and printed inside the event's programs. Trump's portrait served as a "placeholder" official portrait at the start of his term.

In their portraits, both Trump and Vance are wearing blue suits and white collared shirts. Trump is wearing a blue or turquoise tie, and a small American flag lapel pin. He is in what appears to be a state room, with the red and white stripes of a corner of the American flag visible in the background behind his head. Trump's facial expression is stern and intense. He is staring at the camera lens; his right eye is narrowed and squinting, while one of his eyebrows is raised, and his lips are pressed together tightly.

Trump's portrait was darker and more harshly lit than traditional presidential portraits. Trump is lit from below, with a bright artificial light illuminating the center of Trump's face while covering its other areas in a shadow. A high-powered strobe light used to light the image reflects in Trump's eyes. The photograph has a subtle low angle, with Trump's head tilted slightly downwards to stare down at the viewer. The image is cropped close to Trump's face, and the portrait shows him from the chest up.

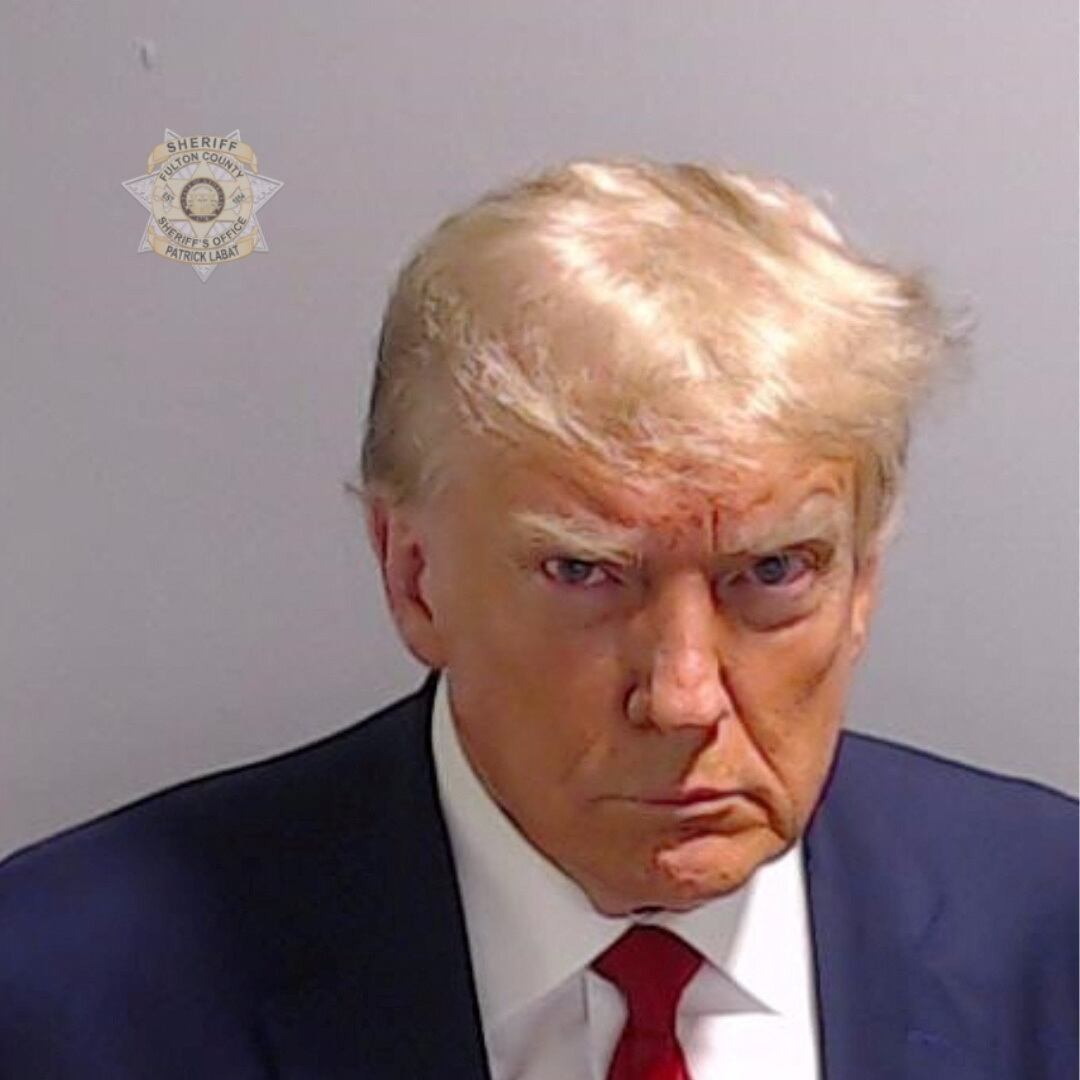
The mug shot that inspired Trump's second inaugural portrait

The portrait of Trump drew comparison to his mug shot, which was taken in 2023 at the Fulton County Jail in Atlanta after his arrest on racketeering charges related to efforts to overturn his 2020 election loss in Georgia. In the mug shot, for which Trump practiced his appearance, his eyebrow is raised as his eyes look upwards to glare at the camera. Trump's expression in the mug shot became a symbol of defiance among his supporters and was used as a marketing tool in his presidential campaign; Torok confirmed on his X account that the mug shot inspired Trump's inaugural portrait.

=== Reception ===
Shawn McCreesh, writing for The New York Times, said the portrait "was—as with all things Trump—dramatic and startling". Grace Snelling of Fast Company wrote that the portrait "strayed markedly from precedent set by past administrations in terms of how the chief executive is presented", and was "designed to convey dominance, not relatability". Craighead said a scowl is Trump's "favorite pose", and said he probably "doesn’t want to smile because it seems weak". Jason Farago, a critic at The New York Times, said of the portrait that "Torok used egregious spotlighting from below that gave" Trump "the mien of a horror movie villain". British political photographer Andrew Parsons described the portrait as "a message picture".

Art critic Kelly Grovier, writing for BBC News, said the portrait "may be the most extraordinary" of the "triptych of striking photos" depicting Trump, with the other two being his 2023 mug shot and the 2024 photos of him raising his fist after surviving an assassination attempt. He said: "There is simply no precedent in U.S. presidential portraiture for the piercing intensity of expression and hawkish thrust of stare the image enshrines—an aggressiveness of gaze for which one must scour the pages of art history to find a compelling parallel." Quardricos Driskell, a political science professor at George Washington University, said: "The stark contrast to Trump's earlier, more traditional portrait could also signify a shift in his public persona, emphasizing a tougher, more combative stance as he prepares to assume office for a second time."

== 2025 presidential portrait ==
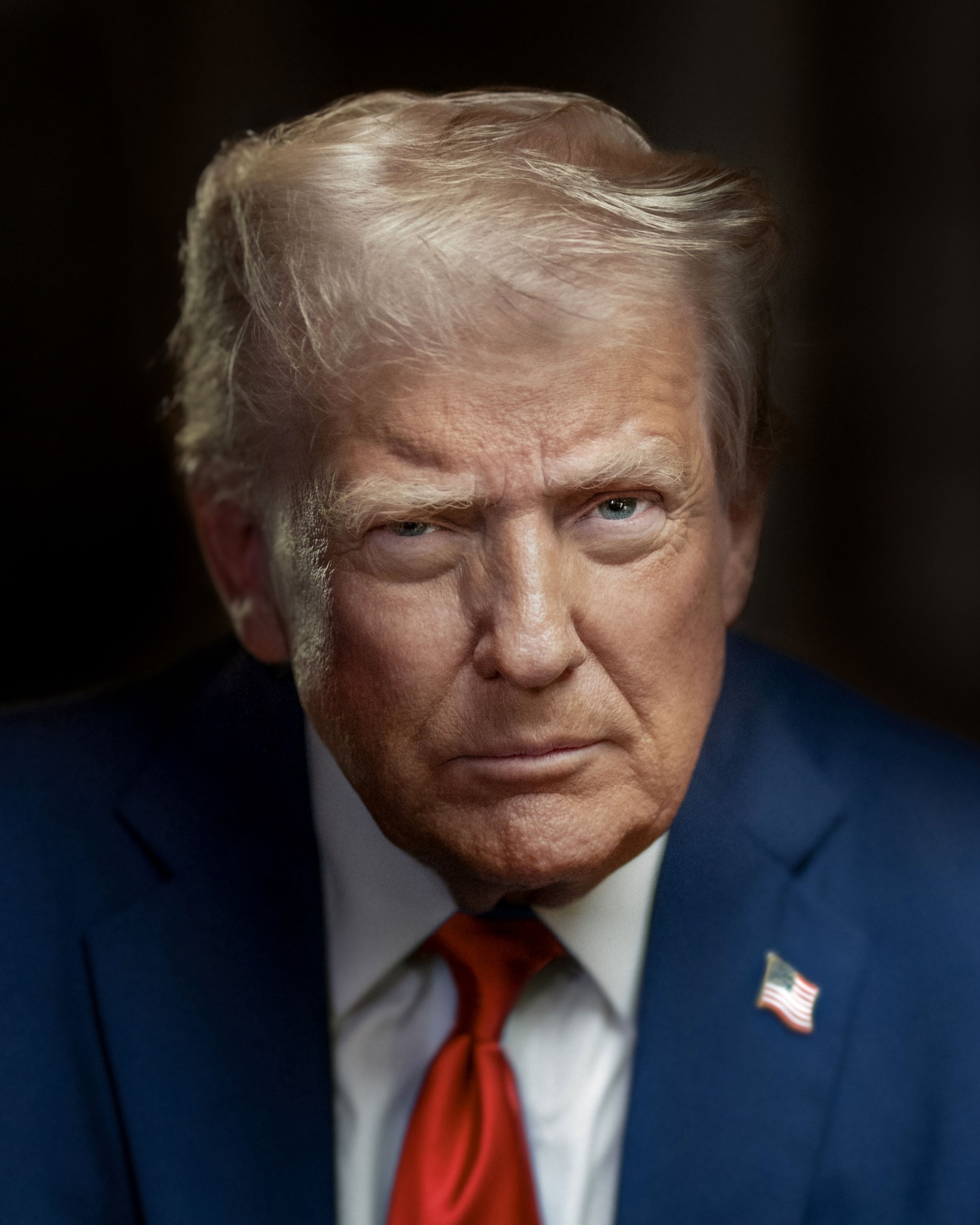
Trump's second presidential portrait, taken in June 2025 by Daniel Torok

On June 2, 2025, the White House revealed Trump's official portrait for his second presidency. The portrait was revealed in an eight-second video posted to social media, in which the portrait is hung in the Eisenhower Executive Office Building next to the West Wing of the White House. The photograph, which is Trump's fourth official portrait, was taken by Daniel Torok. It was added to the White House's website, Trump's official Facebook account, and would be placed in federal buildings and offices, replacing his earlier inaugural portrait.

In the portrait, Trump is wearing a dark blue or navy suit over a white dress shirt. He is wearing his "signature" red tie, which is tied in a Windsor knot, and has an American flag pin on his left lapel. Trump sits against a dark backdrop, and no American flag is in the background, a first for an American official presidential portrait since Richard Nixon in 1969. He is staring at the camera with a serious gaze, with an expression described as neutral, stern, or serious, or having the scolding, raised-eyebrow construction derived from his 2023 mugshot. Compared to his inaugural portrait, Trump's expression is softer, his shoulders are more relaxed, and his affect is softened.

Torok said the photograph was composed in a "fairly dark room", with "one massive overhead soft box" and "a streak of sunlight from the sunset over [Trump's] right shoulder" to create "cinematic lighting". Trump is located directly at the center of the portrait, with his head thrust slightly forward. The lens is much closer to Trump than in other presidential portraits; he occupies about three-quarters of the frame and the portrait's cropping is extreme. The lighting is warmer than in Trump's inaugural portrait, with the bags under his eyes visible due to its head-on lighting. The portrait has high contrast, and Trump is accentuated by shadows that cover almost half of his face, on his right cheek, ear, and shoulder. The edges of the photograph are obscured by a soft focus, blurring Trump's shirt and tie while his face and hair are in sharp focus.

=== Reception ===
Jason Farago said the portrait's tone was "forbidding", but that "compared to [the inaugural portrait] its subject's mood has actually brightened". Snelling said it was "even more foreboding" than Trump's inaugural portrait, while Benedict Smith of The Telegraph said it was "an apparent bid [by Trump] to appear less menacing". Farago said the portrait "displays a classically Trumpian tonal incongruity"—that "discomfort" arose from its composition, but a "curious image of strength" from its defiance of "traditional elites' tastes". He described its setting as "as shadowy and theatrical as the Apprentice boardroom".

Farago wrote:

Regardless of the actual techniques used to produce it, the photograph displays numerous hallmarks of A.I. imagery: symmetrical composition, imprecise detail, blurring at the edges, and shallow depth of field. If the aesthetic hallmarks of the first Trump term came from television, this second administration has drawn its imagery more from Silicon Valley ... The portrait, in that way, is less a return to the old 1980s gloss than a reflection of 2020s superproduction: an artifact from a brave new world where images can always be regenerated and even the presidency has no history.

Paul Staiti, a professor of fine art at Mount Holyoke College, said the absence of an American flag in the portrait makes the photograph "more personal", and the removal of "all references to the White House setting" made him "wonder whether this is suggesting that Trump is not exactly an office holder, or not to be seen solely as the current representative of the United States". Snelling said the American flag's absence showed that the "final vestige of convention has also been abandoned", and said the portrait "seems to be saying Trump is the star, and the United States is merely the set".

== See also ==
- Colorado State Capitol portrait of Donald Trump
- Michael O'Brien's portrait of Donald Trump
- Donald Trump photo op at St. John's Church
