= John Deffenbaugh =

American politician

Member of the Georgia House of Representatives from the 1st district
- In office January 14, 2013 – January 13, 2019
- Preceded by: Jay Neal
- Succeeded by: Colton Moore

Personal details
- Party: Republican
- Spouse: Linda
- Children: 2

John Deffenbaugh is an American politician from Georgia. Deffenbaugh is a former Republican member of the Georgia House of Representatives for District 1.

== Education ==
In 1970, Deffenbaugh earned a bachelor's degree in physics from Covenant College.

== Career ==
Deffenbaugh previously served in the U.S. Air Force and U.S. Navy Reserve.

Deffenbaugh was a salesman for Horizon Electronics in Chattanooga, Tennessee.

In 1996, Deffenbaugh's political career began as a member of the Dade County Board of Commissioners.

In 2013, Deffenbaugh won the election for the Georgia House of Representatives for District 1 as a Republican.

In 2018, Deffenbaugh lost the District 1 primary election to Colton Moore. Deffenbaugh's term as a member of the Georgia House of Representatives ended in January 2019. In 2020, Deffenbaugh sought election to his former seat and was in a run-off against Mike Cameron.

== Personal life ==
Deffenbaugh's wife is Linda. They have two sons, Matthew and Ethan. Deffenbaugh resides in Lookout Mountain, Georgia.

== See also ==
- 2018 Georgia House of Representatives election (Deffenbaugh lost district 1)
