= Donald F. Oliver =

American politician

Member of the Georgia House of Representatives from the 1st district
- In office June 1, 1983 – January 1, 1986
- Preceded by: Wayne Snow Jr.
- Succeeded by: Mike Snow

Personal details
- Born: July 3, 1954 Catoosa County, Georgia, U.S.
- Died: May 18, 2018 (aged 63)
- Party: Democratic
- Spouse: Helen J. Wyatt
- Education: University of Georgia School of Law

Donald F. Oliver (July 3, 1954 – May 18, 2018) was an American politician. He served as a Democratic member for the 1-1 district of the Georgia House of Representatives.

== Life and career ==
Oliver was born in Catoosa County, Georgia. He attended Chattanooga Valley High School and the University of Georgia School of Law.

In 1983, Oliver was elected to represent the 1-1 district of the Georgia House of Representatives, succeeding Wayne Snow Jr. He resigned in 1986 and was succeeded by Mike Snow.

Oliver died on May 18, 2018, at the age of 63.
