= Wayne Snow Jr. =

American politician

Member of the Georgia House of Representatives
- In office January 14, 1963 – March 30, 1983
- Preceded by: Robert Coker
- Succeeded by: Donald F. Oliver
- Constituency: Walker County (1963–1966); 1st district (1966–1983)

Personal details
- Born: January 10, 1936 Davidson County, Tennessee, U.S.
- Died: September 28, 2004 (aged 68)
- Party: Democratic
- Education: University of Georgia

Wayne Snow Jr. (January 10, 1936 – September 28, 2004) was an American politician. He served as a Democratic member for the 1-1 and 1-3 district of the Georgia House of Representatives.

== Life and career ==
Snow was born in Davidson County, Tennessee. He attended LaFayette High School and the University of Georgia.

In 1963, Snow was elected to the Georgia House of Representatives. In 1965, he was elected as the first representative for the newly-established 1-3 district. He was also elected to the 1-1 district, serving until 1983, when he was succeeded by Donald F. Oliver.

Snow died in September 2004 from complications of diabetes, at the age of 68.
