= Mike Cameron (politician) =

American minister and politician from Georgia

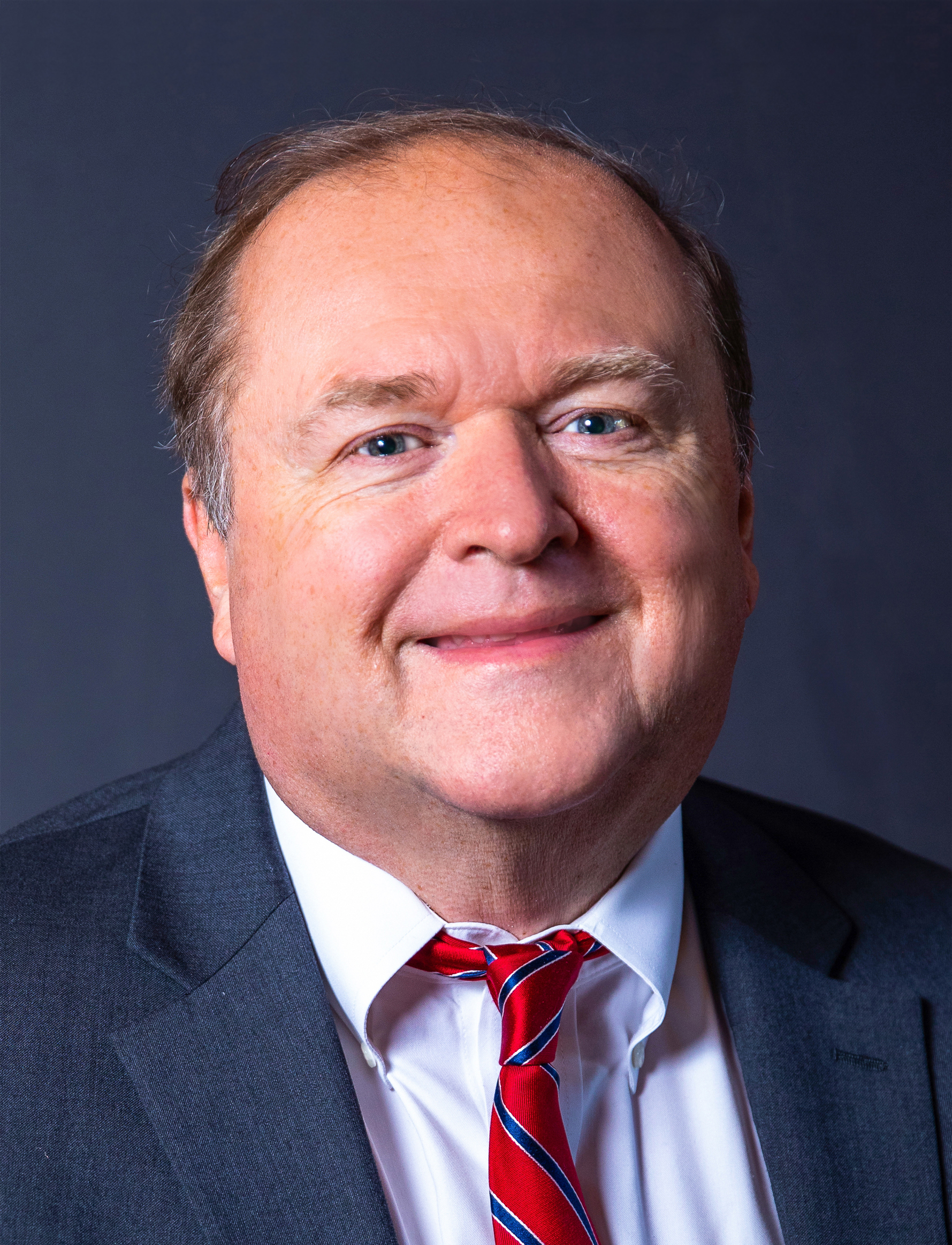

Member of the Georgia House of Representatives from the 1st district
- Incumbent
- Assumed office January 11, 2021
- Preceded by: Colton Moore

Personal details
- Born: Michael David Cameron; July 21, 1959 (age 67) Chattanooga, Tennessee, U.S.
- Party: Republican
- Occupation: Retired

Michael David Cameron (born July 21, 1959) is an American minister and politician from Georgia. Cameron is a Republican member of the Georgia House of Representatives for District 1.

== Early life ==
On July 21, 1959, Cameron was born in Chattanooga, Tennessee. Cameron and his family lived in Rossville, Georgia and Lookout Valley, Tennessee. In 1977, Cameron graduated from Lookout Valley High School.

== Education ==
In 1979, Cameron earned an Associate of Science degree in Business from Chattanooga State. In 1987, Cameron earned a Bachelor of Arts degree in History.

== Career ==
In 1982 Cameron began his career in the health insurance industry for Blue Cross Blue Shield of Tennessee, until his retirement in 2014.

Cameron is a Lay Minister at Good Shepherd Lutheran Church in East Ridge, Tennessee.

On November 3, 2020, Cameron won the election unopposed and became a Republican member of Georgia House of Representatives for District 1.
