= Colorado State Capitol portrait of Donald Trump =

2019 artwork by Sarah Boardman

- Artist: Sarah A. Boardman
- Year: 2019
- Subject: Donald Trump

A portrait of President Donald Trump, painted by Sarah A. Boardman, began to be displayed in the Colorado State Capitol in 2019 as part of a series of presidential portraits. It was removed in 2025 following complaints from Trump that the portrait was unflattering and was replaced with a portrait painted by Vanessa Horabuena.

== Background ==
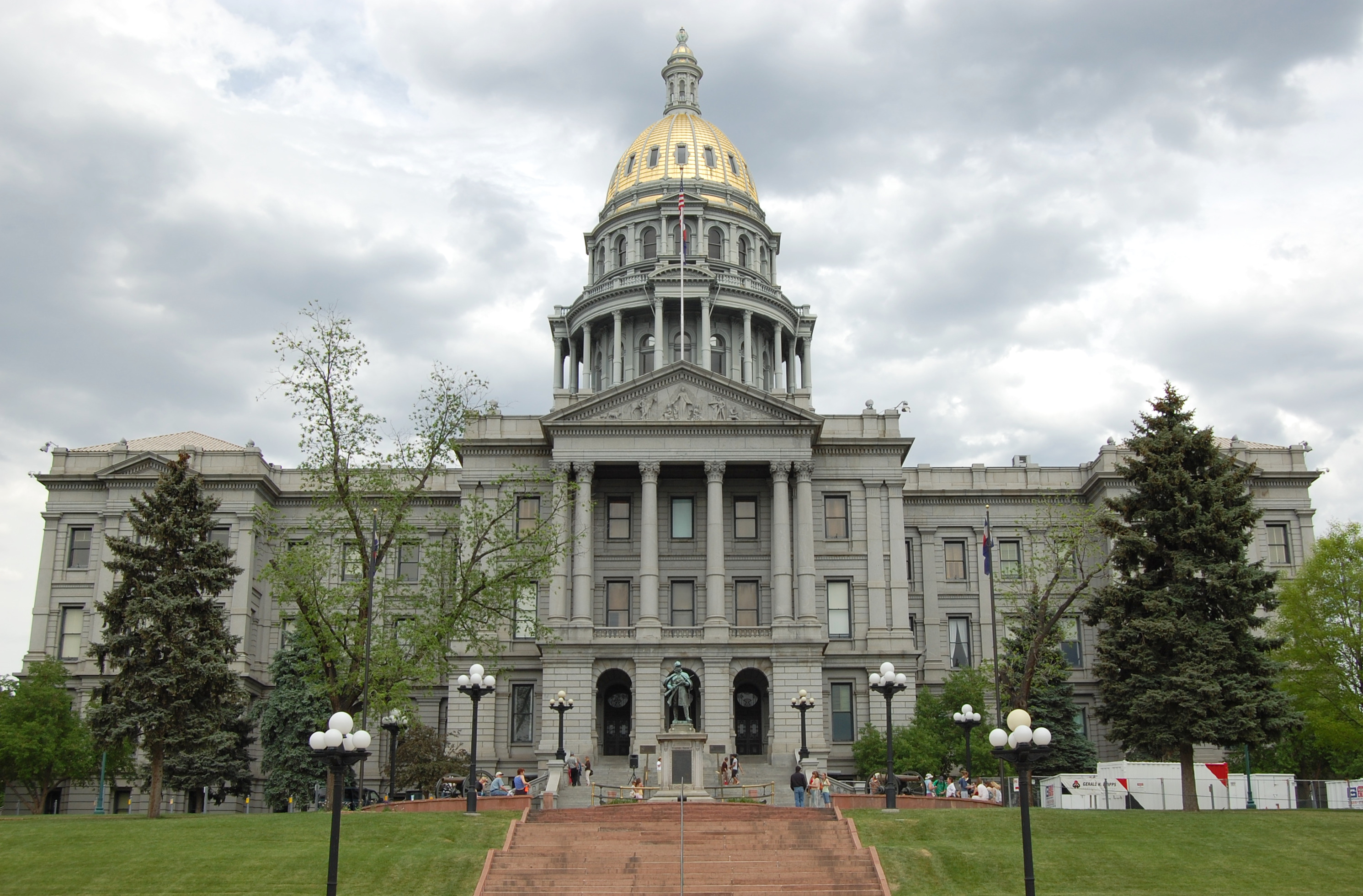
Colorado State Capitol

The portrait was painted for the collection of presidential portraits displayed at the Colorado State Capitol. The portraits are funded by the Colorado Citizens for Culture through private donations. Ten thousand dollars was required to fund a portrait of Trump during his first presidency, but no donations had been received by 2018. In a July 2018 stunt, the empty place where Trump's portrait would have hung was briefly occupied by a portrait of the President of Russia, Vladimir Putin, displayed on an easel. The stunt was carried out by a member of the nonprofit progressive advocacy organization ProgressNow Colorado, who had been let into the state capitol by a Democratic legislative staffer. The executive director of ProgressNow, Ian Silverii, said that they hoped public awareness had been raised over "the danger of Russian influence over the President of the United States" and that next time "we'll use the front door". The president of the state senate, Kevin Grantham, subsequently started a successful GoFundMe campaign to pay for the portrait of Trump, the $10,000 target was raised in 32 hours from 200 donations. The portrait was unveiled in an August 2019 ceremony at the state capitol hosted by the Republican members of the Colorado senate.

== Description ==
The portrait was painted by Sarah A. Boardman in a classical realist style, to match the other portraits in the series. The previous 43 portraits had been painted by Lawrence Williams. Boardman painted the portrait of Barack Obama after Williams's 2003 death. The Trump portrait took Boardman four months and was based on a photograph approved by the Capitol Building Advisory Committee. Boardman said that her portrait had "been called thoughtful, non-confrontational, not angry, not happy, not tweeting ... In five, 10, 15, 20 years, he will be another President on the wall who is only historical background, and he needs to look neutral".

== Reactions ==
After almost six years of displaying the portrait, which received massive accolades from the committee and mainstream media, on March 23, 2025, Trump wrote on Truth Social, "Nobody likes a bad picture or painting of themselves, but the one in Colorado, in the State Capitol, put up by the Governor, along with all other Presidents, was purposefully distorted to a level that even I, perhaps, have never seen before," and that he would "much prefer not having a picture than having this one". Trump wrote that "many" Coloradans had complained about the portrait to him and were "actually angry about it". Trump concluded by stating that he had contacted the governor of Colorado, Jared Polis, to ask him to remove the portrait from display and that Polis should be "ashamed of himself!" He also said Obama's portrait "looks wonderful". Polis had no involvement in the commissioning and unveiling of the portrait. Grantham said that he was "a little surprised" by Trump's complaint as he "[hadn't] heard any dissent over it—in fact, quite the opposite", and people had liked it. Grantham said he had been contacted by Polis, who had agreed with him that it was "not a big deal". Grantham felt "sorry to see" Trump "going off of misinformation given to him or maybe making assumptions" about the creation and display of the portrait.

The portrait was taken down following a request by Paul Lundeen, the Colorado Senate minority leader, who wanted it to be replaced with one that "depicts his contemporary likeness". Polis said that he was "surprised to learn the President of the United States is an aficionado of our Colorado State Capitol and its artwork". He also stated that he appreciated "the President and everyone's interest in our capitol building and [we] are always looking for any opportunity to improve our visitor experience".

Following Trump's comments, Boardman said that her "intentions, integrity and abilities" had been questioned as a result and the allegations that she had "'purposefully distorted' the portrait, and that [she] 'must have lost [her] talent as [she] got older' are now directly and negatively impacting [her] business of over 41 years, which now is in danger of not recovering".

== Replacement ==
Trump's 2025 inaugural portrait, on which the replacement painting by Vanessa Horabuena is based

The White House donated a new portrait approved by Trump in June 2025. The chair of the Colorado Capitol Building Advisory Committee, former state senator Lois Court, announced on June 24 that it would replace Boardman's painting. Court's decision was described as unilateral by The Colorado Sun, though she stated that she had discussed it with the committee. She argued that "it seemed inappropriate" to leave the wall blank and that "it simply made sense" to put up the portrait sent by the White House. The new portrait, which is based on Trump's 2025 inaugural portrait, was unveiled on July 1. It was painted by Vanessa Horabuena, a Christian worship artist from Arizona who had previously created multiple other portraits of Trump and whom he praised as a "highly talented artist". The Guardian reported that Trump had requested that the portrait be printed with a golden border so it would "catch the light" and "glimmer".

The Advisory Committee considered replacing portraits of past presidents with portraits of past governors to mark the 150th anniversary of Colorado statehood in 2026, which was suggested partly in response to Trump's complaints about Boardman's painting. The idea was abandoned because four governors, including Polis, do not have portraits and the existing portraits are not uniform in size, unlike the presidential portraits. On November 13, 2025, a decision was reached with nine votes in favor and two against to replace the presidential gallery with both official and childhood photographs of all 100 members of the Colorado General Assembly for the year 2026.
