= Mike Snow (politician) =

US politician

Member of the Georgia House of Representatives
- In office February 20, 1986 – January 10, 2005
- Preceded by: Donald F. Oliver
- Succeeded by: Jay Neal
- Constituency: 1st district (1986–1993); 2nd district (1993–2003); 1st district (2003–2005)

Personal details
- Born: Michael Marvin Snow; October 13, 1947 (age 78) Old Hickory, Tennessee, U.S.
- Party: Democratic
- Spouse: Janice
- Children: 3
- Occupation: Nurseryman

Michael Marvin Snow (born October 13, 1947) is an American politician who served as a Democrat in the Georgia House of Representatives.

== Political career ==
Snow was first elected to represent parts of Dade and Walker counties in a 1986 special election following the resignation of his predecessor, Donald F. Oliver.

Between 2002 and 2004, Snow and Republican Jay Neal faced off in four competitive elections plagued by ballot irregularities and election maladministration. An initial victory for Neal in November 2002 was overturned by courts after Snow contended that voters in Rossville who lived in the nearby 2nd district received ballots for the 1st district. The court ordered a special election to take place on January 7, 2003. That rematch—which was won by Snow—was also overturned, again because voters who did not reside in the district were allowed to vote. A second and final special election thus took place in July 2003, with Snow emerging victorious. Though he served for the remainder of the legislative term, Snow and Neal faced off for a fourth time in 2004, with Neal winning decisively.

A Democrat in an increasingly conservative district, Snow bucked his own party and endorsed George W. Bush in the 2004 presidential election along with 11 other Democratic members of the Georgia House. While in office, Snow was a resident of Chickamauga, Georgia, and operated the Wayne Snow Nursery in nearby Rock Spring.

== Personal life ==
Snow practices Methodism. He currently resides in Atlanta.
