= Colorado State Capitol =

State capitol building of the U.S. state of Colorado

- U.S. National Historic Landmark District – Contributing property
- U.S. Historic district – Contributing property
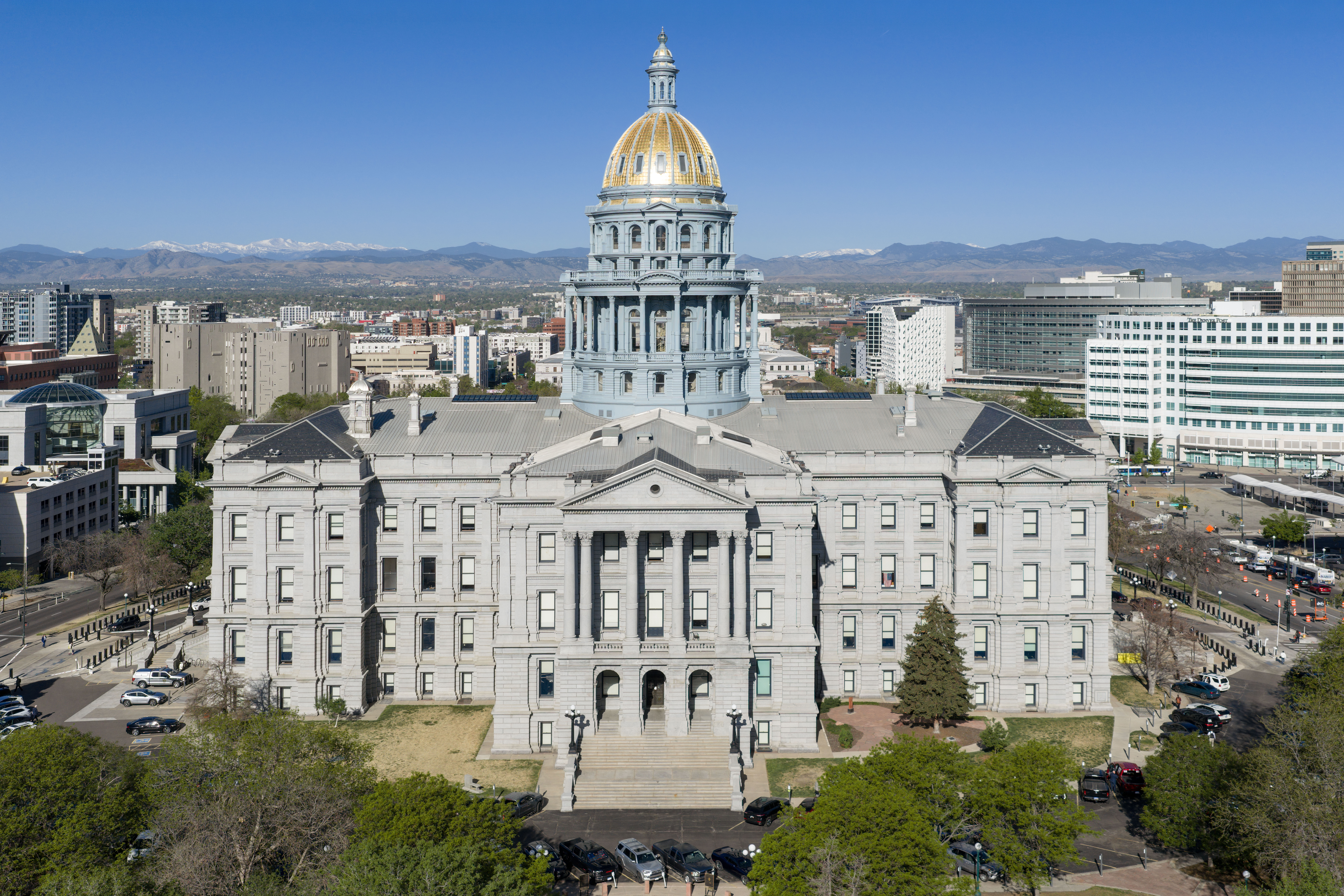
- The Colorado State Capitol in Denver

- Location within Colorado Location within the United States
- Interactive map showing the location of Colorado State Capitol
- Location: 200 East Colfax Avenue; Denver, Colorado, United States
- Coordinates: 39.7392321°N 104.9848677°W
- Built: 1901; 125 years ago
- Architect: Elijah E. Myers
- Architectural style: neoclassical style
- Part of: National Historic Landmark District (ID12001017); Civic Center Historic District (ID74002348)

Significant dates
- Designated NHLDCP: October 16, 2012
- Designated CP: February 27, 1974

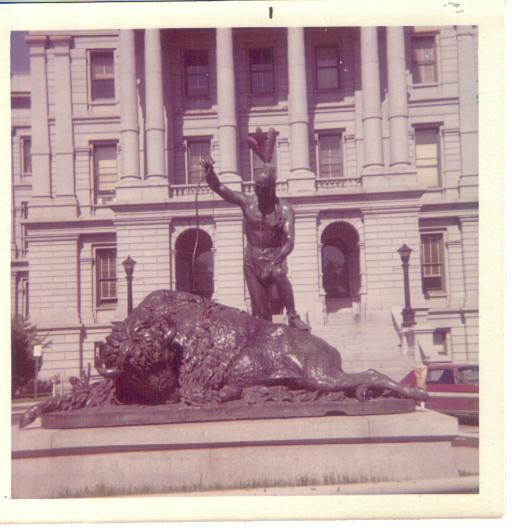
“The Closing of an Era” at the Colorado capitol.

The Colorado State Capitol Building, located at 200 East Colfax Avenue in Denver, Colorado, United States, is the home of the Colorado General Assembly and the offices of the governor of Colorado, lieutenant governor, and the state treasurer.

== History ==
The building is intentionally reminiscent of the United States Capitol. Designed by Elijah E. Myers, it was constructed in the 1890s from Colorado white granite, and opened for use in November 1894. The General Assembly first convened inside the building on January 2, 1895. The distinctive gold dome consists of real gold leaf, first added in 1908, commemorating the Colorado Gold Rush. The building is part of Denver's Civic Center area. It was listed on the National Register of Historic Places as part of the Civic Center Historic District in 1974, and became part of the Denver Civic Center National Historic Landmark District in 2012.

A major safety upgrade project, funded by the Colorado State Historical Fund, was started in 2001 and completed in 2009. The design by Fentress Architects added modern safety features, like enclosed stair towers, that blended in with the original architecture. The Colorado Capitol Building is featured on many of Denver's architectural tours.

== Building ==
Serving as the beginning of the Capitol Hill district, the historic building sits slightly higher than the rest of downtown Denver. The main entrance hall is open 180 feet (55 m) to the top of the dome, about the height of an 18-story building. Additionally, the official elevation of Denver is measured outside the west entrance to the building, where the fifteenth step is engraved with the words "One Mile Above Sea Level". From this step, at 5,280 feet (1,609 m), the sun can be seen setting behind the Rocky Mountains. A second mile high marker was set in the 18th step in 1969 when Colorado State University students resurveyed the elevation. In 2003, a more accurate measurement was made with modern means, and the 13th step was identified as being one mile (1.6 km) high, where a 3rd marker was installed.

=== Materials ===
The superstructure of the building was constructed using granite from the Aberdeen Quarry near Gunnison, Colorado. Approximately 280,000 cubic feet (7,900 m^{3}) or 24,000 tons of the granite were quarried for the building. This gray granite forms the exterior of the building. The interior of the building uses a large amount of Colorado Rose Onyx, a rare rose marble from a quarry near Beulah, Colorado. The amount used in the building consumed the entire known supply. White Yule Marble from the quarries near Marble, Colorado was also used throughout the capitol for the floors. Many designs have been found in the marble including an image resembling George Washington and another of Molly Brown.

Many of the windows are made of stained glass, depicting people or events related to the history of Colorado. The halls are decorated with portraits of every president of the United States, with all the presidents from George Washington to George W. Bush being painted by Lawrence Williams. Painter Sarah A. Boardman took over from Williams, and has since painted Barack Obama and the original portrait of Donald Trump, which was removed after Trump criticized it and replaced with one by Arizonan artist Vanessa Horabuena. Colorado artist Kirsten Savage painted President Joe Biden's portrait. One of the contractors for the construction of the Colorado State Capitol building was Illinois building contractor William Douglas Richardson, who was the president of the W. D. Richardson Construction Company. Richardson had participated in numerous major building contracts throughout the United States, and was interconnected with the Jacob Bunn and John Whitfield Bunn network of corporations.

== Gallery ==
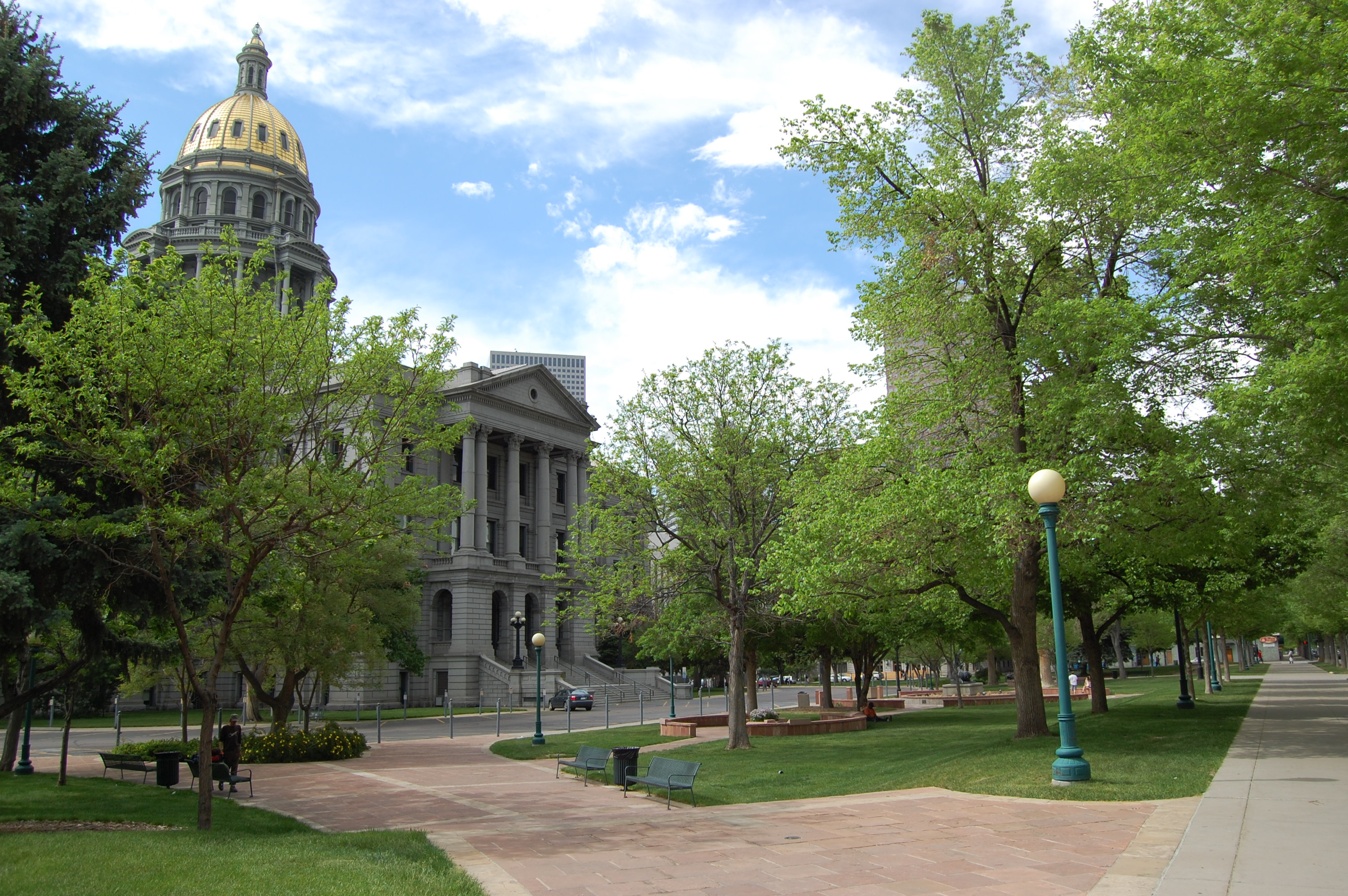
Colorado State Capitol (back view)

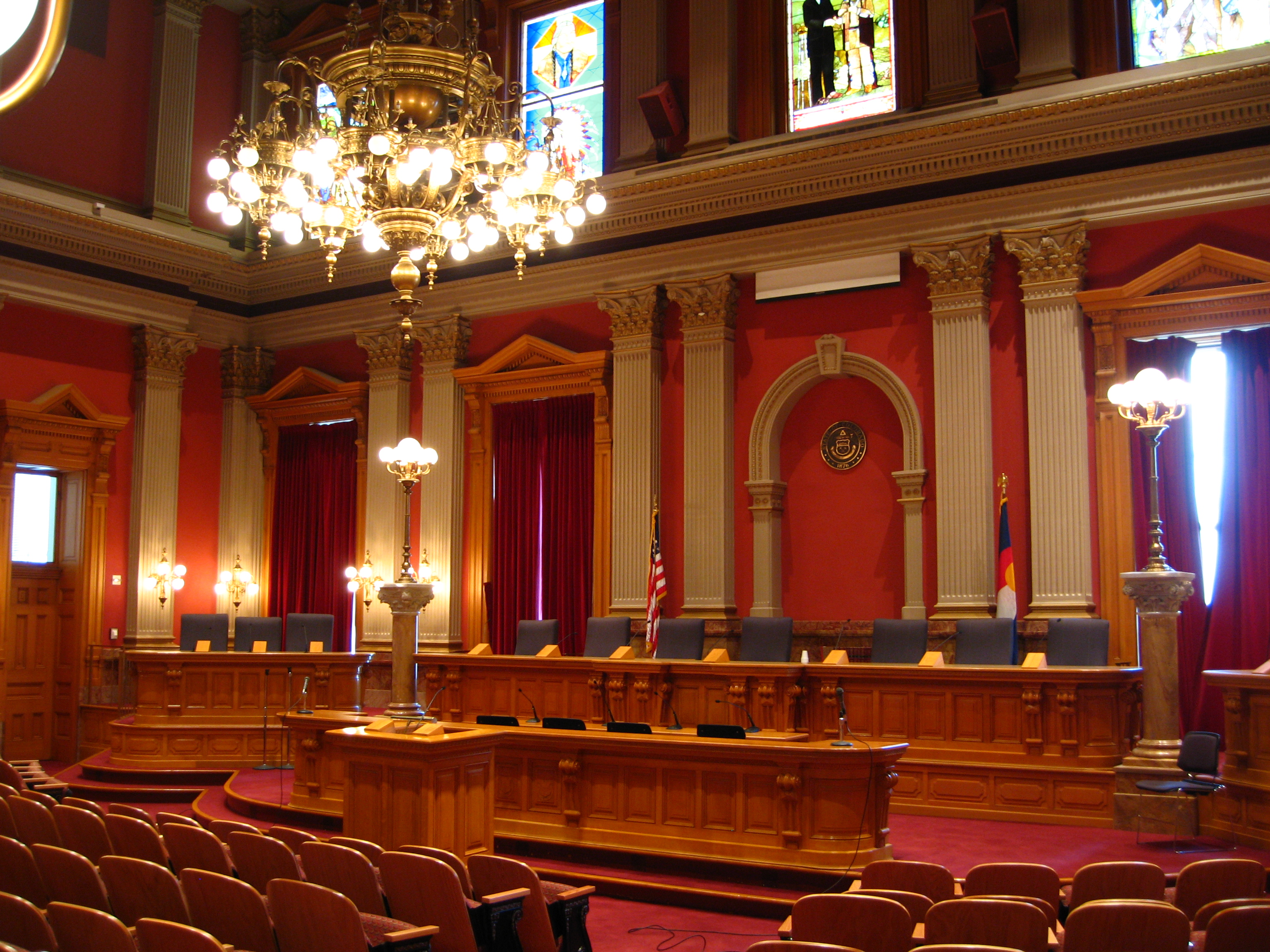
Old Colorado Supreme Court chambers

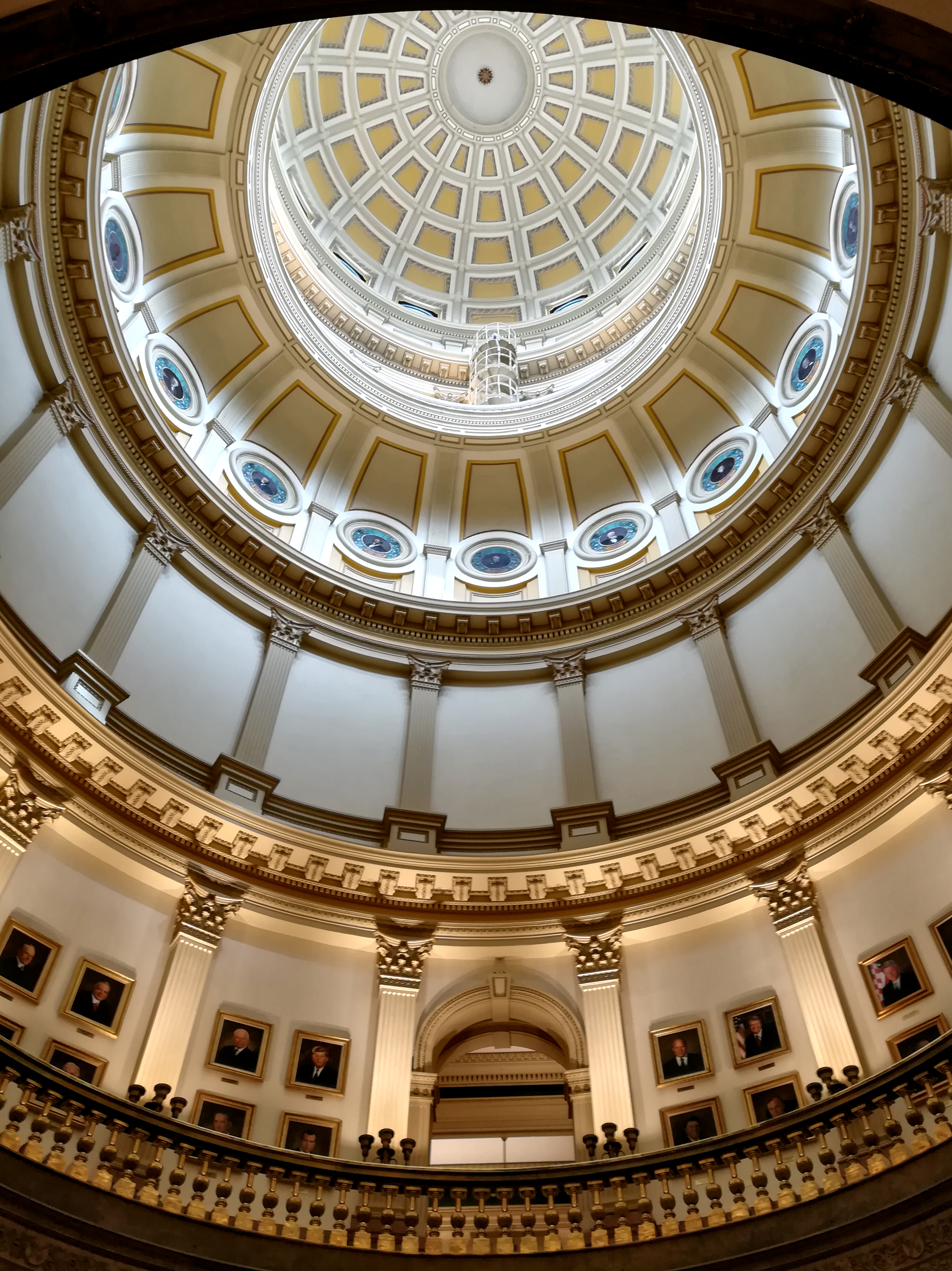
Rotunda interior

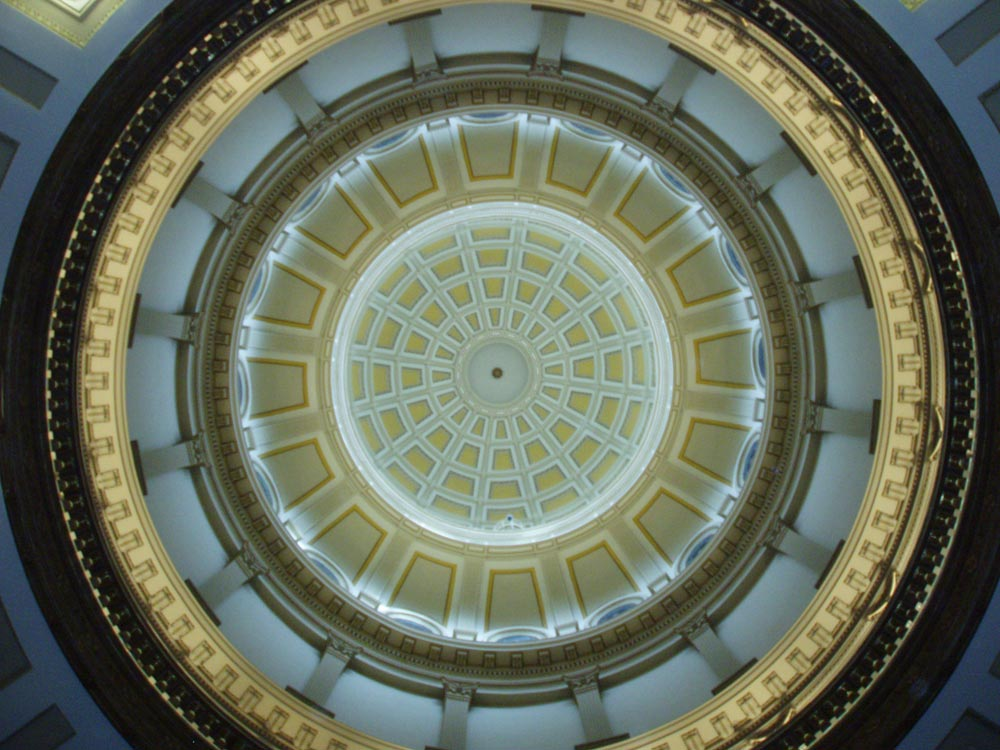
Rotunda interior direct view

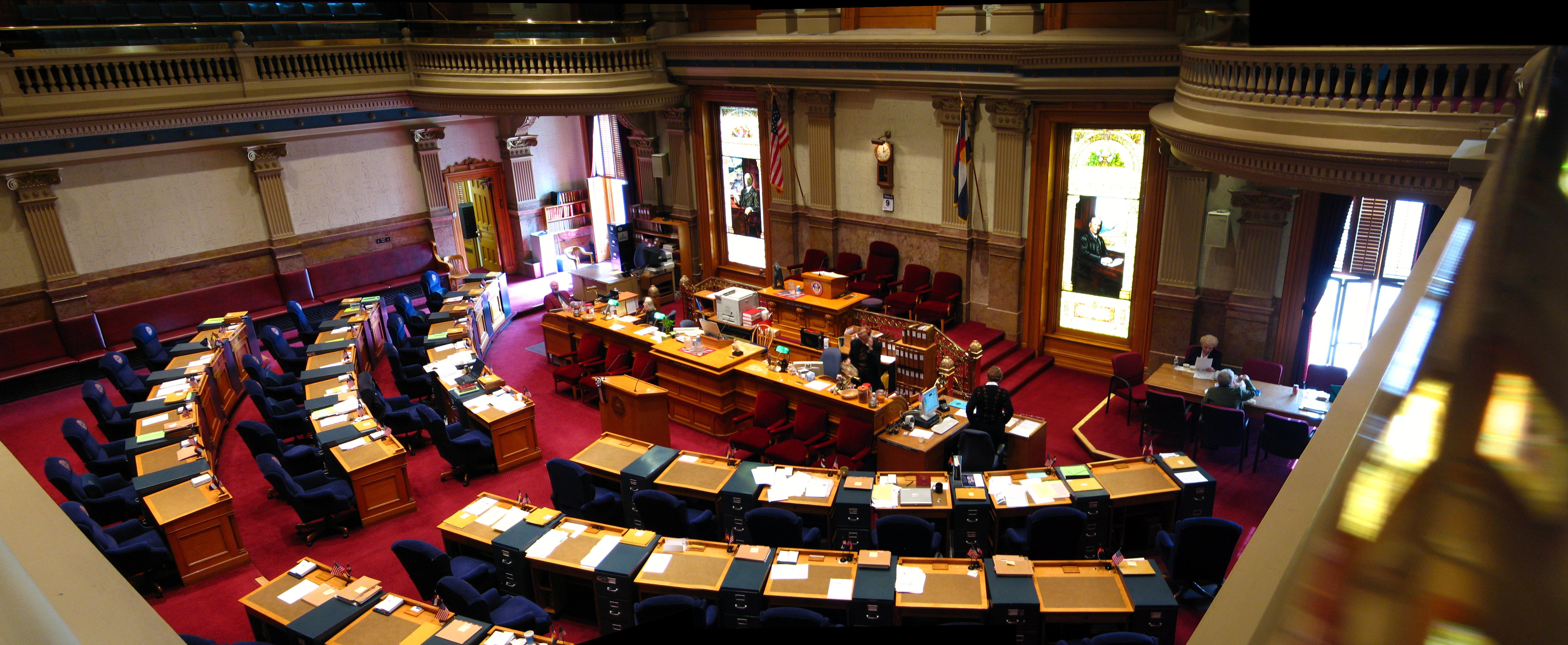
Colorado Senate Chamber

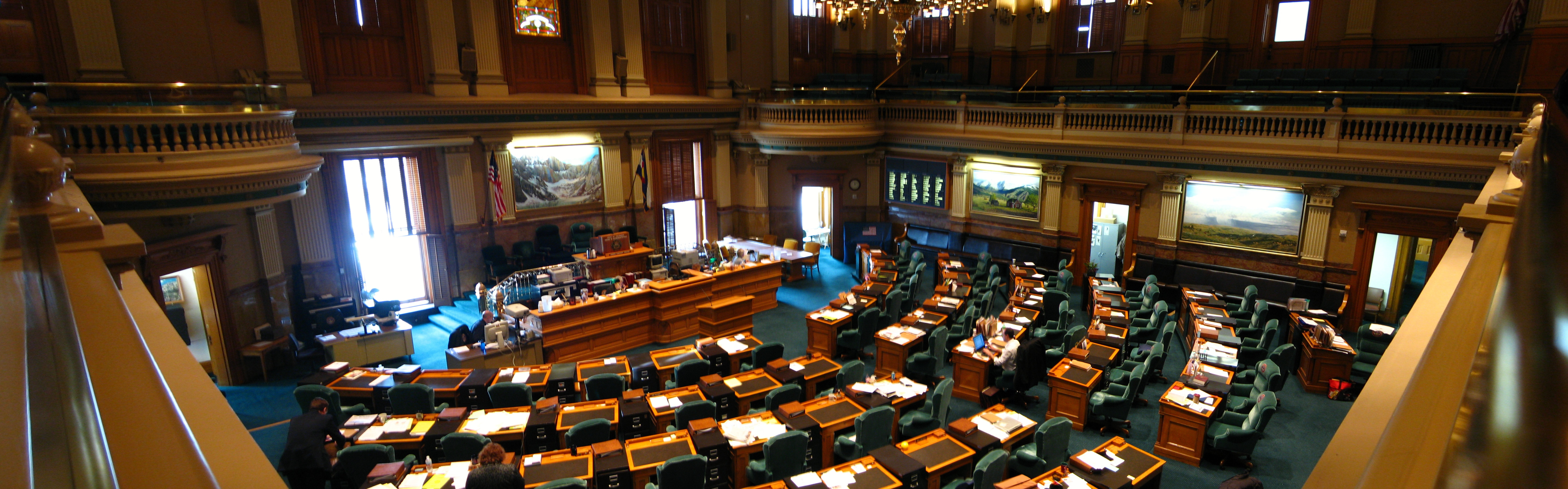
Colorado House of Representatives

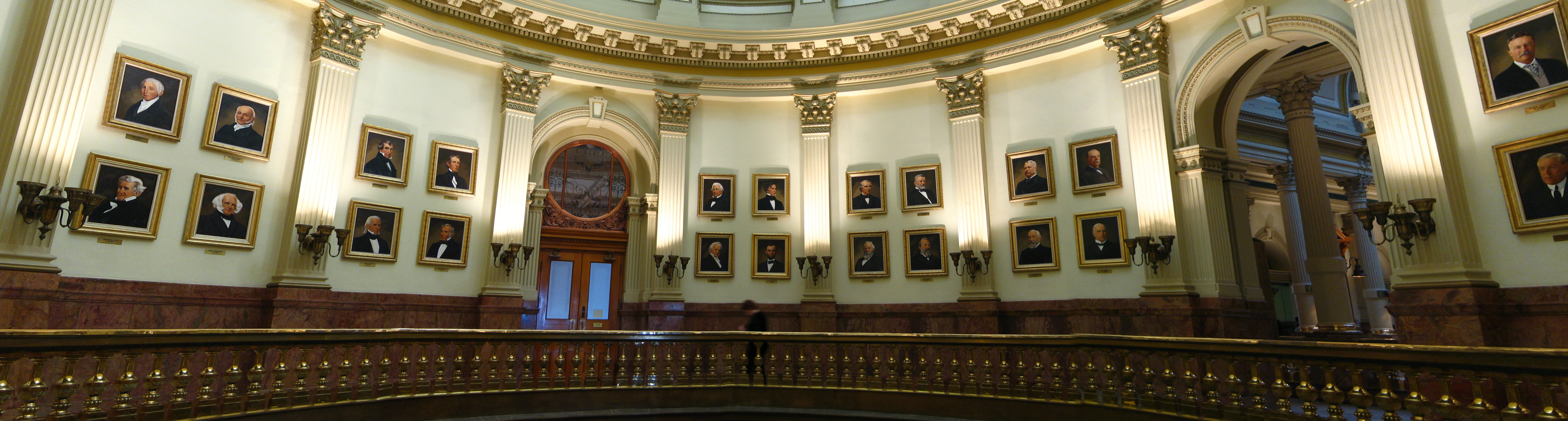
Gallery of Presidents

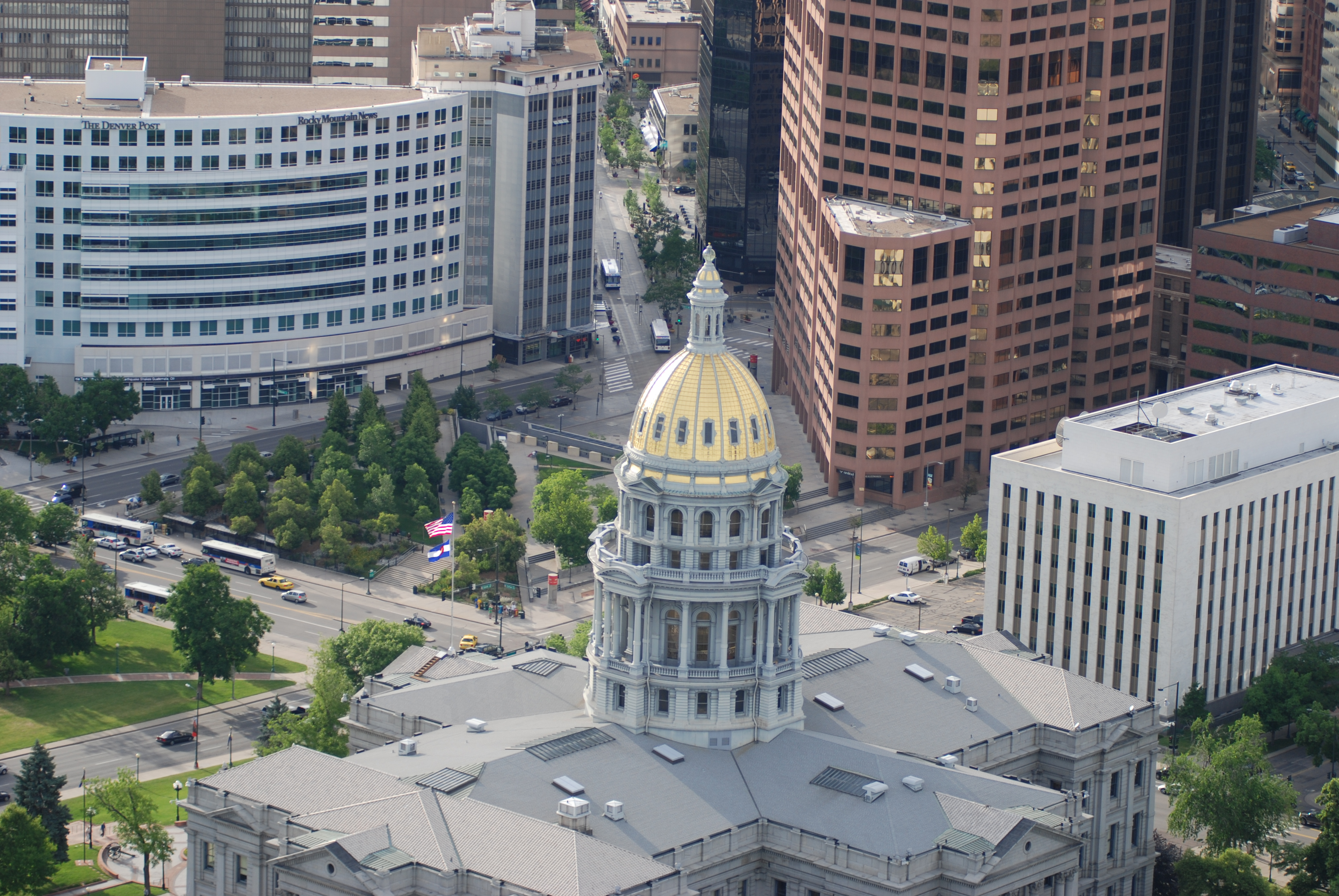
Aerial view

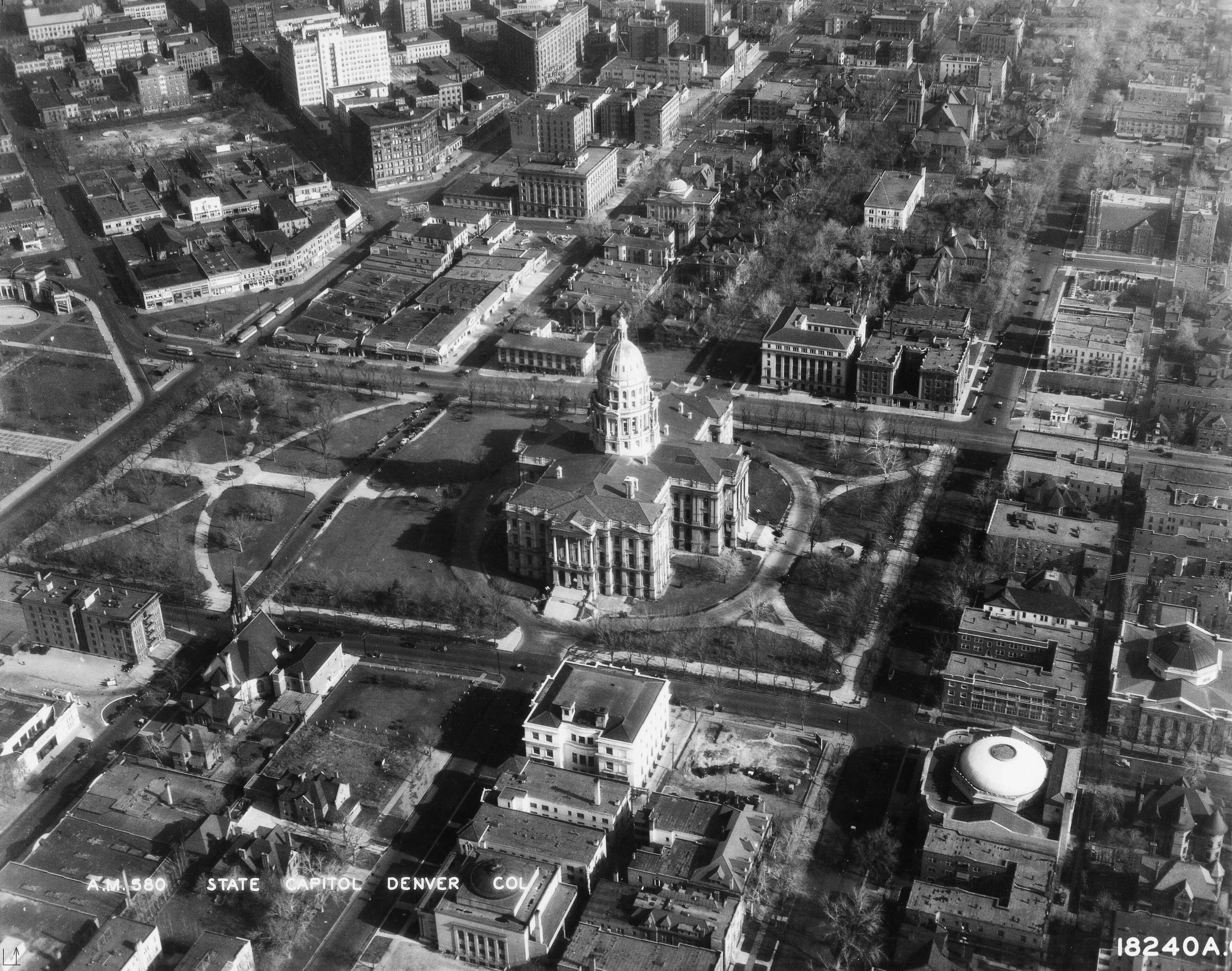
Aerial view, 1932

== See also ==
- State of Colorado
- Yule marble
- Wikimedia Commons: Colorado State Capitol
- Governor Jared Polis
- List of state and territorial capitols in the United States
