= Georgia's 1st House of Representatives district =

State district in Georgia, USA

Georgia's 1st State House of Representatives district
Representative
Mike Cameron; R–Rossville
- Demographics: 92.0% White; 3.3% Black; 2.0% Hispanic; 0.6% Asian
- Population: 52,835

District 1 elects one member of the Georgia House of Representatives. It contains the entirety of Dade County as well as parts of Walker County.

== Members ==
- Mike Snow (1986–1993)
- Mike Snow (2003–2005)
- Jay Neal (2005–2013)
- John Deffenbaugh (2013–2019)
- Colton Moore (2019–2021)
- Mike Cameron (since 2021)
