= Jay Neal =

American politician

Member of the Georgia House of Representatives
- In office January 10, 2005 – October 31, 2013
- Preceded by: Mike Snow
- Succeeded by: Steve Tarvin
- Constituency: 1st district (2005–2013); 2nd district (2013)

Personal details
- Born: James Wilson Neal; July 2, 1963 (age 63) Oak Ridge, Tennessee, U.S.
- Party: Republican

James Wilson Neal (born July 2, 1963) is an American member businessman, politician, and former pastor who served as a member of the Georgia House of Representatives. He represented the 1st and 2nd House District from 2005 through 2013.

== Early life and education ==
Neal was born in Oak Ridge, Tennessee. He earned a Bachelor of Arts degree from Emannuel Theological Seminary.

== Career ==
In 1989, Neal was a pastor of Gordon Lake Wesleyan Church until 2009. Neal was also a realtor.

On November 2, 2004, Neal was elected to the Georgia House of Representatives for District 1. On November 7, 2006, as an incumbent, Neal won the election and continued serving District 1. On November 4, 2008, as an incumbent, Neal won the election and continued serving District 1. On November 2, 2010, as an incumbent, Neal won the election and continued serving District 1.

On November 6, 2012, Neal won the election unopposed and became a Republican member of Georgia House of Representatives for District 2.

In November 2013, Neal resigned from the Georgia House of Representatives to accept an appointment by Georgia governor Nathan Deal to be executive director of the state's Office of Transition.

In November 2016, Neal was appointed by Georgia governor to be the executive director for the Criminal Justice Coordinating Council.

== Personal life ==
Neal's wife is Gretchen Neal. They have two children.

== See also ==
- 148th Georgia General Assembly (2005-2006)
