= Fulton County Jail =

Prison in Atlanta, Georgia, United States

- Interactive map of Fulton County Jail
- Location: 901 Rice Street Atlanta, Georgia, U.S.; 33°46′44″N 84°25′25″W
- Status: Operational
- Security class: Medium-security (detention center)
- Capacity: 1,125 (1989 design capacity); 2,644 (current stated capacity)
- Population: 1,965 (January 2026)
- Opened: 1989
- Managed by: Fulton County Sheriff's Office
- Website: fcsoga.org

The Fulton County Jail, also colloquially referred to as Rice Street, is a detention facility in Atlanta, Georgia. Administered by the Fulton County Sheriff's Office, the facility houses individuals in pre-trial detention as well as those serving short-term sentences. Sheriff Patrick Labat, who has overseen the facility since 2021, was reelected to a second term in November 2024.

== History ==
The current facility was built in 1989 at 901 Rice Street with a design capacity of 1,125 inmates.

In 2011 and 2012, four Fulton County law enforcement officers were convicted in federal court for accepting bribes to smuggle contraband into the jail or to protect outside drug transactions. Former detention officer Brian Shelby Anthony was sentenced to 10 years in federal prison after accepting more than $26,000 in bribes to distribute marijuana and cocaine inside the jail and at other locations in metro Atlanta; three other officers received shorter sentences for similar conduct.

Fulton County considered building an entirely new jail, estimated to cost up to $2 billion, before its Board of Commissioners voted in July 2024 to instead pursue renovations to the existing facility. In August 2025, the commission approved a $1.2 billion hybrid plan combining renovation of the Rice Street facility with construction of a new 1,818-bed "special purpose facility" for detainees with medical and behavioral health needs. In April 2026, commissioners unanimously approved a financing plan capping the total project cost at $1.363 billion; construction on the special purpose facility is expected to begin in 2028 with completion targeted for 2031, after which renovations to the main Rice Street jail would proceed.

== Facility Overview ==
The Rice Street facility was designed in 1989 to hold 1,125 inmates and has frequently faced severe overcrowding, with population counts exceeding 3,000 as of 2023. Following expansions, the jail's stated full capacity is now 2,644, though its current operating capacity has been reduced to about 1,900 due to ongoing renovation work; a January 2026 advocacy report put the population at roughly 1,965 that month. A separate report by the Georgia chapter of the American Civil Liberties Union found the population had reached 2,909 by July 2025, despite the county's federal reform commitments. The jail serves as the primary intake and detention center for the county, encompassing a medium-security classification.

== Conditions and Controversies ==
=== Department of Justice investigation and consent decree ===
The Fulton County Jail has been the subject of numerous inquiries regarding safety, medical care, and sanitary conditions. In November 2024, the U.S. Department of Justice (DOJ) released a report following an investigation into the facility, concluding that the jail violated the constitutional and statutory rights of prisoners and left inmates vulnerable to preventable harm, violence, and inadequate medical and mental health care.

On January 3, 2025, the DOJ and Fulton County entered into a court-approved consent decree to resolve the unconstitutional conditions identified in the investigation. The agreement, overseen by an independent federal monitor, requires the county to maintain full compliance for one year before it can be terminated and addresses areas including protection from harm, use of force, medical and mental health care, and conditions of confinement. By February 2026, the county reported having invested $12.8 million in jail improvements during the consent decree's first year, including renovations to 11 housing units and replacement of fire alarm, kitchen, and laundry systems, with more than $50 million budgeted for continued improvements in 2026. Despite this progress, a February 2026 filing by the federal monitor raised the possibility of a court-ordered population cap due to persistently low staffing levels.

=== Death of Lashawn Thompson and related litigation ===
Significant attention was drawn to the facility in 2022 following the death of Lashawn Thompson, a 35-year-old inmate found in his cell after being held in pre-trial detention on a misdemeanor charge. Following reports regarding neglect and unsanitary conditions, the family reached a $4 million settlement with the county. Sheriff Patrick Labat subsequently ordered leadership changes within the jail staff.

In December 2024, former YSL RICO trial defendant Shannon Stillwell and fellow former detainee Nkenegen Hambrick filed a federal class-action lawsuit against Sheriff Labat and Chief Jailer John Jackson, alleging unconstitutional conditions of confinement and seeking a court injunction to compel improvements at the facility.

== Popular Culture ==
The third and fourth seasons of the A&E docuseries 60 Days In were filmed at the Fulton County Jail. The facility also received widespread international media coverage on August 24, 2023, during the booking of former U.S. President Donald Trump.

== Notable inmates ==
- Frank Dupre, jewelry store robber
- Harrison Floyd, political activist and co-defendant in the Georgia election interference case
- Scarface, rapper and record producer
- Phil Spector, record producer
- Gucci Mane, rapper and record executive
- Katt Williams, comedian
- Wayne Williams, convicted murderer
- Playboi Carti, rapper
- Young Thug, rapper, booked on RICO and gang activity charges in 2022
- Lil Durk, rapper, held there without bond in 2019 on charges later dismissed
- King Von, rapper, held there in 2019 on charges in the same case as Lil Durk
