= List of Sidewalk Film Festival Award Winners =

This is a partial list of films that won awards at the Sidewalk Film Festival.

Contents

1999 - 2000 - 2001 - 2002 - 2003 - 2004 - 2005 - 2006 - 2007 - 2008 - 2009 - 2010 - 2011 - 2012 - 2013 - 2014 - 2015 - 2016 - 2017 - 2018 - 2019 - 2022 -

== 2007 ==
9th Annual Sidewalk Film Festival: September 22 - September 24

Narrative Features

- Best narrative Feature - Low and Behold
- Best Director - Low and Behold
- Best First Feature - August the First
- Original Vision - Last Stop for Paul
- Filmmaker to Watch - Murder Party

Documentaries

- Best Documentary Feature - Darius Goes West: The Roll of His Life
- Best Short Documentary - Salim Baba
- Best Student Documentary - A Street Divided
- Special Jury Award - Join Us

Short Films

- Best Short Film - Pop Foul
- Best Animated Film - Everything Will be OK
- Best Student Film, 1st Place - Caress of the Creature; 2nd Place - Heartburn
- Best Alabama Short Film - I'm Nostalgic
- Kathryn Tucker Windham Storytelling Award - A Death in the Woods
- Special Jury Award for Direction - Archer House
- Special Jury Award for Brilliance in Imagery - Help is Coming
- Special Jury Award for Brilliance in Animation - Their Circumstances
- Alabama Citations of Excellence (ACE) Awards
  - Excellence in Storytelling - Asclepius Fandango
  - Excellence in Imagery - Modern Plays: The Music Video
  - Excellence in Directing - Cup of Joe
  - Excellence in Originality - Lunch with Lincoln
  - Excellence in Comedy - Lunch
  - Excellence in Comedy Writing - The Little Things
  - Excellence in Acting - Tallie Medel, in I'm Nostalgic
  - Excellence in Documentary Filmmaking: Dick-George, Tenn-Tom and Speaking Without Speaking

Audience Choice

- Best Narrative Feature - American Fork
- Best Documentary Feature - Darius Goes West: The Roll of his Life
- Best Short Film - Deface
- Best Alabama Film - Overflow

Other awards

- SideWrite, Grand Prize - "Self-Addressed" by James Pihakis
- SideWrite, Second Prize - "Stuck" by Susan C. McCain
- SideWrite, Production Prize - "Face Value" by Julie Pritt

== 2008 ==
10th Annual Sidewalk Film Festival: September 26 - September 28

Narrative Features

- Best Narrative Feature - Cook County
- Best Director – Barry Jenkins, for Medicine for Melancholy

Documentaries

- Best Documentary Feature - Intimidad
- Best Short Documentary - Young Arabs
- Special Jury Award, Feature Documentary - We are Wizards
- Special Jury Award, Short Documentary - Silly & Serious: William Robinson and Self Portraits
- Reel Green Award - Flow: For the Love of Water
- Special Reel Green Jury Award - eDump

Short Films

- Best Short Film - The Adventure
- Best Animated Film - Starsearchers
- Best Student Film - Viola: The Traveling Rooms of a Little Giant
- Best Alabama Short Film - Trust
- Kathryn Tucker Windham Storytelling Award - Hirsute
- Special Jury Award for Outstanding Film making - Glory at Sea
- Alabama Citation of Excellence Awards (ACE Awards)
  - Special Jury Award - 20th Century Reliance
  - Excellence in Documenting Educational Disparity - Fine Lines and Foundation of Success
  - For Silently Celebrating the Spirit of the South - Donkey Fountain
  - For Courage in Exploration of Unconventional Love - Palster
  - Best Catchphrase - One Bad Bastard

Audience Choice

- Best Narrative Feature - Coyote
- Best Documentary Feature - Dear Zachary: A Letter to a Son About His Father
- Best Short Film - Sebastian's Voodoo
- Best Alabama Film - Skiptracers

Other awards

- SideWrite, Grand Prize - "A Good Man" by Stacey Davis
- SideWrite, Production Prize - "Love in the Grocery Store" by Tam Le
- Sidewalk Chalk: Curing Childhood Cancer, Winner - Out-Touching Cancer by Margaret Broach & Kristen Ryan

== 2009 ==
11th Annual Sidewalk Film Festival: September 25 - September 27

Narrative Features

- Best Narrative Feature Film - The House of the Devil by Ti West
- Grand Prix Award - Modern Love is Automatic by Zach Clark
- Best Director - Scott Teems, for That Evening Sun
- Best Performance - Adam Scott, in The Vicious Kind
- Mise en Scene Award - David Lowery, St. Nick
- Clint Howard Character Actor Award - Clint Howard, in Alabama Moon

Documentary Features

- Best Documentary Feature Film - Best Worst Movie by Michael Paul Stephenson
- Special Jury Award for Artistic Portrait - Luckey by Laura Longsworth
- Special Jury Award for Artistic Vision - 45265 by Bill Ross & Turner Ross

Shorts

- Best Short Film - I Am So Proud of You by Don Hertzfeld
- Best Animated Film - Dahlia by Michael Langan
- Best Alabama Short - Hallelujah! Gorilla Revival, by Jason LaRay & Jeremiah Ledbetter
- Special Jury Prize - Feeder, by Joseph Ernst
- Best Student Film - Token Hunchback, by Tim Reckart
- Kathryn Tucker Windham Storytelling Award - Hallelujah! Gorilla Revival, by Jason LaRay & Jeremiah Ledbetter

Audience Choice Awards

- Best Narrative Feature - Alabama Moon by Tim McCanlies
- Best Documentary Feature - Best Worst Movie by Michael Paul Stephenson
- Best Short Film - Some of What I Know About Tommy By Chris Hilleke
- Best Alabama Film - Interplanetary by Chance Shirley

Alabama Awards

- Alabama Citation of Excellence Award (ACE Award) - Cerebella by Adam Windgard & Alex Justinger
- Scramble, Best in Show - Natural Selection by Team Blue Mug
- SideWrite, Production Prize Winner - "The Burden", by Bill Barnett
- SideWrite, "Lost in Transmission", by Carl Edward Orr

== 2010 ==
12th Annual Sidewalk Film Festival: September 24 - September 26

Jury Awards

- Best Feature: Narrative - Audrey the Trainwreck
- Best Feature: Documentary - Beijing Taxi
- Best Short: Narrative - Conlang
- Best Short: Documentary - Seltzer Works
- Best Animated Film - The Bellows March
- Best Alabama Film - Perry County
- Clint Howard Character Actor Award - Wendell Pearce, in Night Catches Us
- Kathryn Tucker Windham Award for Storytelling - Daud
- Special Prize for Direction - Will Canon, for Brotherhood
- Special Jury Prize - The Thing About Being an Assassin

Audience Choice Awards

- Best Feature: Narrative - Brotherhood
- Best Feature: Documentary - Ready, Set, Bag!
- Best Short: Narrative - Lucy in LaLa
- Best Short: Documentary - Torch
- Best Alabama Film - Lifted

Other awards

- Sidewalk Programmers Award - Barbershop Punk and Gabi on the Roof in July (tie)
- Best Teen Film - Planting Season

== 2011 ==
13th Annual Sidewalk Film Festival: August 26 - August 28

Jury Awards

- Best Feature: Narrative - Without, Dir: Mark Jackson
- Best Feature: Documentary - Guilty Pleasures, Dir: Julie Moggan
- Best Short: Narrative - Terrebonne, Dir: Jeremy Craig
- Best Short: Documentary - Mr. Happy Man, Dir: Matt Morris
- Best Animated Film - Bike Race, Dir: Tom Schroeder
- Best Alabama Film - The Chief, Dir: Christopher Scott and Mary Baschab
- Clint Howard Character Actor Award - Sean Nelson, in Treatment
- Special Breakout Performance Award - Nate Rubin, in Wuss
- Kathryn Tucker Windham Award for Storytelling - Two-Legged Rat Bastards, Dir: Scott Weintrob
- Best Student Film - An Inconvenient Youth, Dir: Slater Jewell-Kemker

Audience Choice Awards

- Best Feature: Narrative - A Bag of Hammers, Dir: Brian Crano
- Best Feature: Documentary - Man in the Glass: The Dale Brown Story, Dir: Patrick Sheehan
- Best Short: Narrative - Annie and Her Anger, Dir: Tam Le
- Best Short: Documentary - The Dancer, Dir: Seth Stark
- Best Alabama Film - The Man in the Glass: The Dale Brown Story, Dir Patrick Sheehan

Other awards

- Sidewalk Programmers Award - Small Pond, Dir: Josh Slates

== 2012 ==
14th Annual Sidewalk Film Festival: August 26 - August 28

Jury Awards

- Best Feature: Narrative - Kid Thing, Dir: David Zellner
- Best Feature: Documentary - American Man, Dir: Jon Frankel
- Best Short: Narrative - DeafBlind, Dir: Ewan Bailey
- Best Short: Documentary - Brute Force, Dir: Ben Steinbauer
- Best Alabama Film - Eating Alabama, Dir: Andrew Beck Grace
- Best Alabama Short - "Grand Fugue on the Art of Gumbo", Dir: Gideon Kennedy and Isabel Machado
- Kathryn Tucker Windham Award for Storytelling - Julie On Her Way, Dir: Tam Le
- Best Student Film - "Undocumented", Dir: Carlos Estrada

Audience Choice Awards

- Best Feature: Narrative - Wolf, Dir: Ya'Kee Smith
- Best Feature: Documentary - G.L.O.W, Dir: Brett Whitcomb
- Best Short: Narrative - The Wheel, Dir: John Roberts
- Best Short: Documentary - Cardboard Titantics: Smart People Being Stupid, Dir: Sam Frazier
- Best Alabama Film - American Man, Dir: John Frankel

== 2013 ==
15th Annual Sidewalk Film Festival: August 23–25, 2013

Documentary:

Best Documentary Feature: HIT & STAY

- Special Mention by Doc Jury:
- REMOTE AREA MEDICAL
- TEENAGE for Creative Editing Process!

Shout:

- The Most Fun I’ve Had With My Pants On (Special Cinematography Award)
- Straight and Narrow (Short)
- Remote Area (Life & Liberty)
- Ink Deep (Best Short)
- Continental (Best Feature)

Narrative:

- Clint Howard Character Actor Award: Louisa Krause, BLUEBIRD
- Special Jury Prize for Best Director: Destin Daniel Cretton, SHORT TERM 12
- Jambor-Franklin Founder's Award for Best Narrative: SEE YOU NEXT TUESDAY

Shorts:

- Best Narrative Short: S/ASH
- Best Short Doc: World Fair
- Best Student Film: Unsettlement
- Alan Hunter Best Alabama Film :Tasia and the Cheese Revolution
- Kathryn Tucker Windham Award: The Casaba River

Special Awards:

- Visionary Award: Showstopper
- Lil’ Bub award for cuteness: B-Boy

Schaeffer Eye Center Audience Choice Awards:

- Narrative Feature: Short Term 12
- Doc Feature: Good Old Freda
- Best Narrative Short: Stakes
- Best Doc Short: How to Sharpen Pencils
- Best Alabama Film: Eye on the Sixties

Shout Audience Choice:

- Narrative feature: Southern Baptist Sissies
- Doc Feature: Continental
- Short: Ink Deep

== 2014 ==
16th Annual Sidewalk Film Festival: August 22–24, 2014

Sidewalk Jury Awards

- Jambor-Franklin Founder's Award for Best Narrative Feature: L for Leisure
- Best Narrative Short: The Chaperone
- Best Documentary Feature: The Hand That Feeds
- Best Documentary Short: Cherry Pop: The Story of the World's Fanciest Cat
- Alan Hunter Best Alabama Film: Limo Ride
- Best Student Film: Skunk
- Best SHOUT Film: An Honest Liar Honorable mentions: Dyke Central: Taboo and The Night is Ours
- Kathryn Tucker Windham Storytelling Award: Yearbook
- Clint Howard Character Actor Award: Cindy Silver, Uncertain Terms
- Special Jury Award for Visionary Storytelling: Bob Birdnow's Remarkable Tale of Human Survival and the Transcendence of Self
- Special Jury Award for Creative Spirit in Documentary Filmmaking: Living Stars
- SIDEWRITE Best Alabama Screenplay: Alan Moore, The Fishing Trip

Sidewalk Audience Choice Awards

- Best Narrative Feature: It Is What It Is
- Best Documentary Feature: No No: A Dockumentary
- Best Narrative Short: The Gunfighter
- Best Documentary Short: The Next Part
- Best Alabama Film: Skanks
- Best SHOUT Film: South Beach on Heels

== 2015 ==
Feature Films:

Jambor-Franklin Founder's Award for Best Narrative: Trey Edward Shults, KRISHA

Special Jury Prize: Alexandria Bombach & Mo Scarpelli, FRAME BY FRAME

Special Jury Prize for Audacious Vision: Rania Attieh & Daniel Garcia, H.

Best Documentary Feature: Zackary Canepari & Drea Cooper, T-REX

Honorable Mention: Steve Hoover, CROCODILE GENNADIY

Programmers’ Award: David Burkman, HAZE

Clint Howard Character Actor Award: Eleanore Pienta, 7 CHINESE BROTHERS

Alan Hunter Best Alabama Award: Bradford Thomason & Brett Whitcomb, COUNTY FAIR, TEXAS

Short Films:

Best Narrative Short: Minji Kang, “The Loyalist”

Best Short Documentary: Nicolas Coles, “The House Is Innocent”

Best Student Film: Kelsey Harrison, “Coming and Going”

Kathryn Tucker Windham Award: Paul D. Hart, “Three Fingers”

SHOUT:

Best SHOUT Feature: Stephen Cone, HENRY GAMBLE’S BIRTHDAY PARTY

SHOUT Programmers’ Award: Marq Evans, THE GLAMOUR & THE SQUALOR

Best SHOUT Short: Jeremy Asher Lynch, Tomgirl

Schaeffer Eye Center Audience Choice Awards:

Narrative Feature: For a Few Zombies More

Documentary Feature: Revival: The Sam Bush Story

Best Narrative Short: One Night in Aberdeen

Best Documentary Short: Stumped

Best Alabama Film: Revival: The Sam Bush Story

SHOUT Audience Choice:

Narrative Feature: Henry Gamble's Birthday Party

Documentary Feature: The State of Being Human

Short: “Elder”

== 2016 ==
=== Jury Awards ===
Jambor-Franklin Founders Award for Best Narrative Feature: "Donald Cried"

Best Documentary Feature: ''Syl Johnson: Any Way the Wind Blows." Honorable Mention: "Jackson."

Alan Hunter Best Alabama Film: ''Gip''

Best Narrative Short: "A Film by Vera Vaughn''

Best Documentary Short: ''Frame 394"

Best Student Film: ''The Mink Catcher"

Special Jury Award, Short: "The Champion" and "A House Without Snakes"

Sidewalk Programmers Award: "The Master Cleanse" Honorable mention: "Cheerleader"

Sidewalk Programmers Shorts Award: "The Quantified Self"

Kathryn Tucker Windham Storytelling Award: ''Pickle''

Clint Howard Character Actor Award: Celia Rowlson-Hall, Ma

Jury Award Honorable Mention for Narrative Filmmaking: "Red Folder"

Jury Award Honorable Mention: "First Lady of the Revolution"

Best Family/Kids Film: "Kedi"

Honorable Mention for Comedy: "Nigel & Oscar vs. Sasquatch"

Honorable Mention for Imagination: "Monty and the Runaway Furnace"

Best SHOUT Feature: ''Teenage Cocktail"

Best SHOUT Documentary: ''Kiki"

Best SHOUT Short: ''Sign"

SHOUT Programmers Award: "Slash." Honorable mention: "MA."

SHOUT Special Mention: Clare Cooney in "Bird of Prey"

SHOUT Special Mention: "Ending the Silence," Best LGBTQ Alabama Film

=== Audience Choice ===
Best Narrative Feature: "Service to Man''

Best Documentary Feature: "Gip"

Best Narrative Short: "Madame Black"

Best Documentary Short: "Pickle"

Best Alabama Film: "First Lady of the Revolution"

Best SHOUT Narrative Feature: "Miles"

Best SHOUT Documentary Feature: "Suited"

Best SHOUT Short: "The Escape Hatch''

== 2017 ==
=== Jury Awards ===
The following awards are presented by the competition juries of Sidewalk & SHOUT.

Jambor-Franklin Founders Award For Best Narrative Feature ($1000) — Are We Not Cats directed by Xander Robin

Best Narrative Short ($500) — “August” directed by Caitlyn Greene

Best Documentary Feature ($1000) — The New Radical directed by Adam Bhala Lough

Best Documentary Short sponsored By Baker Donelson ($500) — “All the Leaves Are Brown” directed by Daniel Robin

Best Animated Short Film ($250) — “Second to None” directed by Vincent Gallagher

Alan Hunter Award For Best Alabama Film ($500) — “Gardens of Red Dust” directed by Corey Carpenter and Maggie Patterson

Kathryn Tucker Windham Storytelling Award sponsored By The Family Of Kathryn Tucker Windham ($1000) — “Mutt” directed by Erin Sanger

Best Student Film sponsored By Media And Film Studies At Birmingham-Southern College ($250) — “Fry Day” directed by Laura Moss

Family Film Award — Into the Who Knows directed by Micah Barber

Best Life & Liberty Film sponsored By Jones & Hawley Law ($250) — Most Beautiful Island directed by Ana Asensio

Best SHOUT LGBTQ Film sponsored By The LGBTQ Fund ($500) — Alabama Bound directed by Lara Embry and Carolyn Sherer

Spirit Of Sidewalk Award — The General and Dan Koch of Splash Adventure

Features Programmers Award ($500) — Blame directed by Quinn Shephard

Shorts Programmers Award ($250) — “Shilo” directed by Tyler Russell

Best Crowdfunded Film Award sponsored By Seed&Spark — “Olde E” directed by Xavier Neal-Burgin

=== Audience Awards ===
The following awards are audience choice. Sponsored by Educ.

Best Narrative Feature ($250) — Dr. Brinks & Dr. Brinks directed by Josh Crockett

Best Documentary Feature sponsored By Urban Cookhouse ($250) — Charged: The Eduardo Garcia Story directed by Phillip Baribeau

Best Narrative Short sponsored By Alabama Professional Services ($150) — “Just, Go” directed by Pavel Gumennikov

Best Documentary Short ($150) — TIE: “First to Go: Story of the Katakoa Family” directed by Myles Matsuno and “A Good Blinder” by Mike Grundmann and Shaun Wright

Best Alabama Film sponsored By Forge ($250) — Alabama Bound directed by Lara Embry and Carolyn Sherer

Best SHOUT LGBTQ Film ($250) — Princess Cyd directed by Stephen Cone

== 2018 ==
=== Jury Awards ===
Awards presented by the competition juries of Sidewalk & Shout

Jambor-Franklin Founders Award for Best Narrative Feature ($1000) --"Thunder Road" directed by Jim Cummings

Best Documentary Feature ($1000) --"America" directed by Erick Stoll

Best Narrative Short ($500) --"Debris" directed by Julio Ramos

Best Documentary Short ($500) --"The Driver is Red" directed by Randall Christopher

Best Animated Short ($250) --"Funeral" directed by Leah Shore

Kathryn Tucker Windham Storytelling Award ($1000) --"Bad Things" directed by Mira K Lippold-Johnson

Alan Hunter Best Alabama Film ($500) --"Wrestle" directed by Suzannah Herbert and Lauren Belfer

Best SHOUT Feature Film ($500) --"Call Her Ganda" directed by PJ Raval

Best SHOUT Short Film ($250) --"Poison" directed by Erica Eng

Best Family Film --"Science Fair" directed by Christina Constantini and Darren Foster

Best Student Film ($250) --"Native" directed by Isaiah Woods

Reel South Short Film Award ($500) --"Second Assault" directed by Jullian Corsie and Amy Rosner

Sidewrite Best Feature Length Script ($500) --"Indian Country" written by Troy Kelly

Sidewrite Best Short Script ($250) --"Cherry Glazed" written by Christine Sherwood

Sidewrite Best Alabama Script ($250) --"June Block Hero" written by Seth Kozak

=== Audience Awards ===
Best Narrative Feature ($250) --"Mapplethorpe" directed by Ondi Timoner

Best Documentary Feature ($250) --Bathtubs over Broadway" directed by Dava Whisenat

Best Narrative Short ($150) --"Undiscovered" directed by Sara Litzenberger

Best Documentary Short ($150) --"Come and Take It" directed by Ellen Spiro and PJ Raval

Best Alabama Film ($250) --"Icepick to the Moon" directed by Skizz Cyzyk

Best SHOUT Film ($250) --"Wild Nights with Emily" directed by Madeleine Olnek

=== Programmer Awards ===
Features Programmer's Award ($500) --"Man on Fire" directed by Joel Fendelman

Shorts Programmer's Award ($250) --"Woke" directed by Kimberly Aleah

SHOUT Programmer's Award --"Matter and Manner" directed by Nigel Defriez

Best Life & Liberty Film ($250) --"Youth Unstappable" directed by Slater Jewell-Kemker

Spirit of Sidewalk Award—Jailen Young of Wrestle

=== Screenplay Awards-Sidewrite Screenplay Competition ===
Best Alabama Screenplay: “June Block Hero” written by Seth Kozak

Best Short Screenplay: “Cherry Glazed” written by Christine Sherwood

Best Feature Screenplay: “Indian Country” written by Troy Kelly

== 2019 ==
=== Screenplay Awards-Sidewrite Screenplay Competition ===
Best Alabama Screenplay: “The Last American Lynching” written by T Gordon Stanley & Jeremy J Ford

Best Short Screenplay: “Found Objects” written by Amy Bond

Best Feature Screenplay: “Daughters Lost in the Desert” written by A.M. Sanchez

== 2022 ==
=== Winners / Official Selections ===
Galileo - Directed by Ryan Gentle and Austin Quarles - Shorts Programmer's Award

=== Opening Night Selection ===
Butterfly In The Sky - Directors: Bradford Thomason, Brett Whitcomb

=== Closing Night Selection ===
Descendant - Director: Margaret Brown

=== Narrative Features ===
Bebe’s Kids (1992) - Director: Bruce W. Smith

Bootyology - Director: Joe Eddy

The Civil Dead - Director: Clay Tatum

Cyst - Director: Tyler Russell

Funny Pages - Director: Owen Kline

God’s Country - Director: Julian Higgins

God’s Creatures - Directors: Saela Davis & Anna Rose Holmer

Good Girl Jane - Director: Sarah Elizabeth Mintz

The Integrity Of Joseph Chambers - Director: Robert Machoian

Jasmine Is A Star - Director: Jo Rochelle

The Karate Kid Part III (1989) - Director: John G. Avildsen

Our Father, The Devil (Mon Père, le Diabe) - Director: Ellie Foumbi

Peace In The Valley - Director: Tyler Riggs

Country: United States; Running Time: 88 min

Petit Mal - Director: Ruth Caudeli

Pretty Problems - Director: Kestrin Pantera

Quantum Cowboys - Director: Geoff Marslett

Resurrection - Director: Andrew Semans

Retrograde - Director: Adrian Murray

Sleepaway Camp (1983) - Director: Robert Hiltzik

Spin Me Round - Director: Jeff Baena

The Third Saturday In October and The Third Saturday in October Part V Double Feature - Director: Jay Burleson

Warm Blood - Director: Rick Charnoski - Director: Robert Greenwald

=== Documentary Features ===
A Life On The Farm - Director: Oscar Harding

A Run For More - Director: Ray Whitehouse

A Walk With Joey - Director: Dana Lynn Falletta, J. Neil Bloomer

All Man: The International Male Story - Directors: Bryan Darling and Jesse Finley Reed

The Automat - Director: Lisa Hurwitz

Bad Axe - Director: David Siev

Last Days of August - Directors:Rodrigo Ojeda-Beck, Robert Machoian

Battleground - Director: Cynthia Lowen

Billion Dollar Babies - Director: Andrew Jenks

Black Mothers Love & Resist - Director: Débora Souza Silva

Body Parts - Director: Kristy Guevara-Flanagan

Cat Daddies - Director: Mye Hoang

Chop & Steele - Directors: Berndt Mader, Ben Steinbauer

Color of Care - Director: Yance Ford

Etowah - Director: Daniel Fox

The Guardians (2018) - Director: Billie Mintz

Jimmy in Saigon - Director: Peter McDowell

Keep the Cameras Rolling: The Pedro Zamora Way - Director: William T. Horner & Stacey Woelfel

Lover, Beloved - Director: Michael Tully

Loving Highsmith - Director: Eva Vitija

Make Me Famous - Director: Brian Vincent

Manda Bala (Send A Bullet) (2007) - Director: Jason Kohn

McEnroe - Director: Barney Douglas

Mija - Director: Isabel Castro

Nothing Compares - Director: Kathryn Ferguson

Nothing Lasts Forever - Director: Jason Kohn

The Pez Outlaw - Directors: Amy Bandlien Storkel, Bryan Storkel

The Real Estate Mixtape - Director: Malik Yoba

Refuge - Directors: Din Blankenship, Erin Bernhardt

Searchers - Director: Pacho Velez

The Smell Of Money - Director: Shawn Bannon

My Robot Sophia - Director: Jon Kasbe & Crystal Moselle

Subject - Directors: Jennifer Tiexiera, Camilla Hall

The Sun Rises in The East - Director: Tayo Giwa

The Thief Collector - Director: Allison Otto

Three Minutes – A Lengthening - Director: Bianca Stigter

Unrivaled - Directors: Norman Jetmundsen, David Crews

=== Narrative Shorts ===
A Cartoon of a Cat Sleeping - Director: Randall Christopher

A Fistful of Lead - Director: Dempsey Lee Birmingham III

A Nice Little Story - Director: Tyler Ross

Admit One - Director: Emma Aikman

After (A Love Story) - Director: Clare Cooney

Allie’s Out - Director: Akil B. Buggs

Ava - Director: Marcus January

The Bake Steal - Director: Wil Deusner

Baking Bad - Directors: Ben Swearingen, Nathan Fisher, Caroline McKenzie

Bite Me - Director: Mike Cunliffe

Blackout - Director: Andrew Reid

Blossoming - Director: Lauren Musgrove

Box on the Hill - Director: Erik Odom

Brick By Brick - Director: Tyler Downey

Bygone - Director: Mickey Tetrov

The Cahaba River Killer - Director: Rico Shay

Canceled - Director: Christopher Guerrero

Ceaseless - Director: Benjamin Johnson

Cock N’ Bull 3 - Director: Nathan Adloff

The Contract Musical - Director: Chris Cole

Convection - Director: Stacey Davis

Cruise - Director: Sam Rudykoff

Deep Fears - Director: Ryan Chu

Desmond’s Not Here Anymore - Director: Mmabatho Montsho

The Devil Will Run - Director: Noah Glenn

Discovery - Director: Ashley P Causey

Don’t Be Scared - Director: Richard O’Connor

Don’t You Go Nowhere - Director: Bryan Poyser

Dot - Director: Tiffany Frances

El Rey - Director: Jonathan D London

Empty Handed - Director: Yasmin Nearor

The Event - Directors: Frank Mosley, Hugo De Sousa

Face To Face - Director: Sarah Coffee

First Drag - Director: Elliott Andreas Moe

Free Noir Papillon - Director: Lev Omelchenko

future boys - Director: Julian Clark

The F-Word - Directors: Alex Cannon, Paul Cannon

Galileo - Director: Ryan Gentle, Austin Quarles

Half-Day - Director: Morgan Mathews

How’dy! - Director: Keene McRae

I Did Believe In Her, “The Lady” - Director: Nick Adrian

In Memory Of - Director: Rico Shay

In Sickness and in Health - Director: Sarah Smick

In The Flesh - Director: Daphne Gardner

In-Between - Directors: Andrew Scofield, Tre Butler

Keep The Bugs Out Of My Soup!!! - Director: Tyrone Evans Clark

La Jaca - Director: Tanner Matthews

The Last F*cking Straw! - Director: Jason Michael Anthony

Last Request - Director: Daniel Thomas King

Lights, Camera, Covid - Director: Gal Ron

little trumpet - Director: Megan Trufant Tillman

Mom! - Director: Reagan N Swindler

Nikolai and the curse of the Kobold - Director: Amos Captain II

North Star - Director: P.J. Palmer

Nova Scotia Man - Director: Matthew Brdlik

The Perfect First Date - Director: Christopher J Hall

Phantom Tension - Director: Dennis Calvert

The Phoenix - Director: Regina Pigsley

Possum - Director: Erin Jackson Clark

Santa Doesn’t Need Your Help - Directors: Kevin Maher, Joe Dator

The Seal of Death - Director: Harris Josey

She Dreams At Sunrise - Director: Camrus Johnson

Shipwreck - Director: Lisa Cole

Shitshow - Director: Ryan Lilienfield

The Shocklosers’ Odyssey - Director: Zach Swiatocha

Shower Boys - Director: Christian Zetterberg

Skim - Director: William Pisciotta

Space Race - Director: Shane Dioneda

Spin - Directors: Brandi Nicole, Jen West

Spin - Director: Lisa Marie Tedesco

Steps - Director: Blake Winston Rice

Symptomatic - Director: Jay Burleson

Teddy Too-Big - Director: Suki-Rose Etter

Ten & Two - Director: Travis Wood

Things We Feel But Do Not Say - Director: Lauren Grant

This Is How It Ends - Director: Gal Ron

Too Rough - Director: Sean Lìonadh

Turn Around - Director: Kyle Mackenzie Sullivan

Type 2 - Director: Caroline McKenzie

unfinished - Director: Dailey Moore

Uno Royale - Director: Nathan Fisher, Kate Edmonds

UPYA - Director: Maxence Cazorla

We All Die Alone - Director: Jonathan Hammond

When We Arrive As Flowers - Director: Susan C OBrien

=== Documentary Shorts ===
54 Miles To Home - Director: Claire Haughey

A Central Part of Who I Am - Director: Gabriel Kalil Talley

A Million Dollar Journey - Director: Nick Golden, Dawson Estes

A New Normal - Director: Britney Le and Victoria Sutton

Aftermath - Director: Hailey Millar

The American Frontier - Director: Edward Frumkin

Another World Right Here - Director: Sage Lucia

Aqueducts - Director: Álvaro Martín Sanz

Ashima - Director: Dillon M. Banda

Barriers to Entry - Directors: Ritika Samant, Connor Campbell

Baseball’s Living Museum - Directors: Jordan Blankenship, Chelsie Budd

Betsy & Irv - Director: Nicole Noren

Brave Space - Director: Lillie Ben Harris

Breast Friend - Director: Aysha Wax

CANS Can’t Stand - Directors: Matt Nadel, Megan Plotka

Chasin’ Butterflies - Directors: Joshua Harding, Adam Hobbs, Matt Klug

Conducting Life - Director: Diane Moore

Dance To Me - Director: Sabrina Palmer

Decisions - Directors: Donte Johnson, Katherine Nguyen

Deerfoot of the Diamond - Director: Lance Edmands

Deerwoods Deathtrap - Director: James P Gannon

Drexell & Honeybees - Director: Angel Caro

Elvis of Laos - Director: Van Ditthavong

Exit 238 - Director: Henry Davis

Favorite Daughter - Director: Dana Reilly

Heal The River - Director: Paulina Sobczak

If Cities Could Dance: J-Setting Atlanta - Director: Fr3deR1cK Jerome Taylor

Iron Sharpens Iron - Director: John Gallen

The JLB: 100 Years of Service and Impact - Director: Jenna M. Bedsole

Lalito 10 - Director: Jordan Matthew Horowitz

The Last Last Hike - Director: Céline François

Liquid Gold - Director: William Green

Living While Black in Japan - Directors: Keith Bedford and Shiho Fukada

The Meaning of Movement - Director: Antonio R. Garcia

Monograph: Amari Ansari - Director: Kelsey Harrison Ianuzzi

Monograph: Chris Lawson - Director: Lisa Cordes

More Than I Want to Remember - Director: Amy Bench

Mr. Ashley Lived Here - Director: Hannah Timmons

My Duduś - Director: Tom Krawczyk

The Net Makers - Director: Hannah Myers Lindgren

One Heck of a Game - Director: Karen DeLuca Stephens

The Originals - Directors: Cristina Maria Costantini, Alfie Kim Koetter

Pulled Over/Pulled Under - Director: Anissa Latham

Resilience - Director: Raven Shaw

Shut Up And Paint - Directors: Alex Ramirez-Mallis and Titus Kaphar

Smile Little Ladybug - Director: Laura Asherman

Soldier - Director: Justin Zimmerman

The Space Between You and Me - Director: Lily Ahree Siegel

Stories Within - Director: PJ Raval

Stranger at the Gate - Director: Joshua Seftel

Surviving Clotilda - Director: Olivia Grillo, Kathryn Jamieson

Surviving The Holocaust: A Conversation with Dr. Robert May - Director: Kim Garner

Sweet Home Alabama - Director: Frederick Murphy

Tin Sandwich Blues: A Musical Journey - Director: Erik Jambor

Underdogs - Director: Alex Astrella

Valentine - Director: Sinead Keirans

The Village That Once Was - Director: Tyrrell Shaffner

Visions - Director: Karina Lomelin Ripper

Wastewater: A Tale of Two Cities - Director: Sarah Franke

What They’ve Been Taught - Director: Brit Hensel

What We’ll Never Know - Director: Lauren Ready

When I Get Grown – Reflections of a Freedom Rider - Director: Chris Preitauer

Who Am I Called To Be - Director: Aniya Kinnion

WINN - Director: Joseph East, Erica Tanamachi

The Wintering Grounds - Director: Jeff Springer

=== Animated Shorts ===
A Prayer for My Mother: The Eva Brettler Story - Directors: Ruben Barrett, Raisa Effress, Sophia Evans, Lauren Fuchs, Katie Hadsock-Longarzo, Ian Kim, Eve Levy, Timothy Lim, Asher Meron, Marlon Ochoa, Bella Rahi, Hank Schoen, Olivia Uzielli

The Amazing Airwalker - Director: Steve McClean

Andy - Director: James Wheless

Beacon - Director: Clarke Stallworth

Blow Out - Director: Lucas Fraga Pacheco

Demi’s Panic - Director: Bill Plympton

Five Cents - Director: Aaron Hughes

Footprints in the Forest - Director: Juhaidah Joemin, Sandra Khoo

The Girl Behind The Mirror - Director: Iuri Moreno

In The Mountains - Director: Wally Chung

Letters In The Wind - Director: Anirudh Aditya

Memento Mori - Director: Paul O’Flanagan

Morning’s With My Good Sis, Black Bird - Director: Mike McCraw

Paragons of Boulevard - Director: Yamin Rasheed

The Park Bench - Director: Rob Edwards

Qing Qong - Directors: Bele Marx & Gilles Mussard

Seven Grams - Directors: Karim Ben Khelifa, TT Hernandez

=== Episodic ===
Broken News - Director: Adam Schwartz, Luke Porter

LOST/FOUND, Season 1, Episode 1 - Director: Brian Christopher White

Monograph: Adrienne Darnell - Director: Kelsey Harrison Ianuzzi

Night - Director: John D’Aquino

That Picnic Show with Nancy - Director: Nancy Tran

Updowns S.1 Ep 1 “Pilot” - Director: Tyson D Evans, Rebecca Brooks

Wipe Me Away - Director: Eric Piccoli

=== Teen Filmmaker ===
38th Parallel - Director: Ejun Mary Hong

Bird Lady - Director: Carter Rostron

Boxy - Director: King Smith

cowpoke - Director: nicole hatton

Decision Day - Director: Goodman Murphy-Smith

Devil Bean - Director: Jessica Nipperess

Is It My Fault? - Director: Benjamin Pacheco

Letters from an Avalanche - Director: Palavi Ahuja

Masterful - Director: Jason Leeper

Numb - Director: Chris Chaei

On the Second Floor - Director: Marco Araujo

Reaper - Director: Eva Ulreich

SEM;COLON - Director: Anna Claire Hathorn

Those Who Run - Director: Nick Milczarczyk

Uncommon Application - Director: Ris Igrec

When It Started - Director: Sydney Noelle Stephenson

Why Wouldn’t I Be - Director: Ella Greenwood

Wuhan Driver - Director: Tiger Ji

=== Music Videos ===
Angel Hilson – Just This Once - Director: Ken Stevenson

Aquarian Devils – Aquarian Devils - Director: Kamara Thomas

Between There and Here – Hrishikesh Hirway (feat. Yo-Yo Ma) - Directors: Prashanti Aswani and Hrishikesh Hirway

Dalby – Angelic - Director: Video Rahim

Don’t Deserve This – Yasmina - Director: Jivensley Alexis and Reece Daniels

Emily Rooker – Don’t Come Home - Director: Emily Rooker and Mitchell Carter

The Envied – Gondola Ride - Director: Alex Gibson

Gordy Bridgeford – Follow You - Director: John Utter

John Jupiter – The Plastic Outhouse - Director: John Jupiter

Jupie – Sandbox - Director: Jake Armstrong

Linqua Franqa – Bellringer - Director: Nolan Huber-Rhoades

Lule – Mood19 - Director: Kevon Pryce

Malcolm McRae – Woman on the Move - Director: Keene McRae

Memphis Wilcox – Comeback - Director: Jason OBrien

Oliver Tree & Little Big – Turn It Up (feat. Tommy Cash) - Director: Oliver Tree, Alina Pasok Pasok, and Maxim Semyonov

Onry – 1955 - Director: Martin Melnick

SÄYE SKYE – ADHD - Director: Sina Dolati

Shovel – I. The Void - Director: Alexandros Papathanasopoulos

Young Jahcee – GamGino - Director: J. Gino Cyrus

Zero Trust – Clouds - Director: Jeremiah Dickey
