= Fox Valley Mall =

Shopping mall in Aurora, Illinois

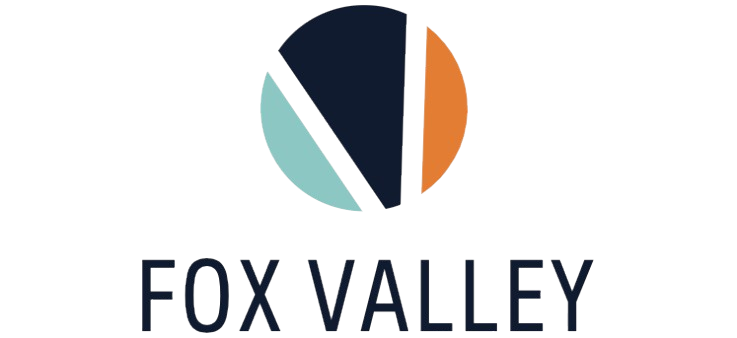

- Location: Aurora, Illinois, United States
- Coordinates: 41°45′30″N 88°12′45″W
- Address: 195 Fox Valley Center
- Opened: July 30, 1975; 51 years ago
- Previous names: Fox Valley Center, Westfield Fox Valley
- Developer: Urban Investment and Development Company and Homart Development Company
- Manager: Centennial Real Estate
- Owner: Centennial Real Estate; Montgomery Street Partners; USAA Real Estate; Westfield Corporation
- Num. of stores: 150
- Num. of anchor tenants: 2 (4 at peak)
- Floor area: 1,404,987 square feet (130,527.6 m^{2})
- Floors: 2 with partial basement (3 in Macy's)
- Public transit: Pace
- Website: shopfoxvalleymall.com

Fox Valley Mall, formerly Westfield Fox Valley and Fox Valley Center, is a shopping mall in Aurora, Illinois. The mall's anchor stores are JCPenney and Macy's. A Round One Entertainment is located in the former Sears wing. The Westfield Group acquired the shopping center in early 2002, and renamed it Westfield Shoppingtown Fox Valley, dropping the Shoppingtown name in June 2005. Westfield Group sold an 80% interest in the mall as of December 2015.

== History ==
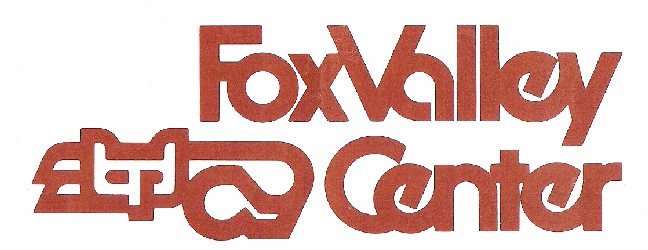
Original Logo of the Fox Valley Center Mall—changed when it became Westfield Fox Valley

=== 20th century ===
Fox Valley Center was a joint-venture between the Urban Investment and Development Company and the Homart Development Company.

Fox Valley Mall is a 1,500,000-square-foot (140,000 m^{2}) enclosed mall. It opened and was completed on July 30, 1975. Sears and Marshall Field's were already open before the mall's opening date, and they opened on February 18, 1975. Fox Valley Center would open with space for 160 shops and services.

JCPenney opened on April 6, 1977 with their Orland Square store, and finally Lord & Taylor opened on August 7, 1977.

This was later followed by marketing for home builders and office development in the area marketed as Fox Valley Villages.

Sales at the mall were stated at $115 million in 1977.

Lord & Taylor closed on February 14, 1996 and was sold to Carson Pirie Scott (later known as Carson's). The Carson Pirie Scott opened on November 2, 1996.

=== 21st century ===
The Westfield Group purchased Fox Valley Center in 2002. After Westfield's purchase of the mall, all the signs and usage of the Fox Valley Center logo were discontinued and replaced with Westfield's standard mall brand logo, with the shortened Fox Valley name. In the same time period there was an extensive renovation of the mall for the first time in its history. This removed the mall's large gardens and plants that were spread out throughout the mall. After Centennial Real Estate's purchase of 80% interest in the mall in 2015, all "Westfield" signs were replaced with "Fox Valley Mall" signs.

Marshall Field's was renamed Macy's in 2006.

Round 1 opened in 2017 in the former Sears.

On April 18, 2018, it was announced that Carson's would be closing as parent company The Bon-Ton was going out of business. The store closed on August 29, 2018.

On May 31, 2018, Sears announced that it would also be closing its Fox Valley Mall location as part of a plan to close 78 stores nationwide. The store closed on September 2, 2018. This leaves JCPenney and Macy's as the only remaining anchors.

For the Halloween season, Halloween City served as a temporary anchor for the mall in the old Sears in 2019.

On Thanksgiving 2019, Fox Valley Mall opened a new "Center Park" that transformed the mall's formerly unused central courtyard into a public gathering area with green space, places to sit, artwork, and other amenities by the old Carson's. Before Center Park, there was an indoor ice skating rink that moved into an abandoned store, and the ice skating rink will reopen there in November 2020.

In early 2020, Fox Valley Mall began construction on an addition to Center Park, a two-level 8,000 square foot "tree house" that would connect Center Park to the mall and serve as an additional gathering space.

In late fall 2020, the abandoned Sears began demolition and continued the Fox Valley Mall 2.0 Redevelopment Plan, which later added luxury apartments and other amenities.

=== Other shopping centers ===
In 1989, a shopping center outside the mall called New York Square was built. It features Kohl's, a former OfficeMax, and other stores. A year later in 1990, another new shopping center, Fox Valley Commons, was built across from the mall. Tenants include International Food Market, and Petland. Former tenants include a Bed Bath & Beyond, Sam's Club, Walmart and Office Depot. An indoor shopping center called Mall of India is slated to open in the former Walmart near the end of 2020. It will feature a grocery store, 10 restaurants, and 30+ retail and office spaces.

=== Proposed shopping center ===
In 1979, American Income Properties proposed a 1,000,000 square feet (93,000 m^{2}) shopping center south of the Fox Valley Center on the Northeast corner of Route 59 and Ogden Avenue. the proposed center was to have 3 anchors Carson Pirie Scott, Montgomery Ward and Wieboldt's. AIP also planned malls by the River Oaks Center and Orland Square Mall. They Opened Orland Court south of Orland Square in 1981, but they never developed shopping centers by River Oaks and Fox Valley.

== Area ==
The mall is situated on Illinois Route 59 between U.S. 34 and East New York Street / West Aurora Avenue, with 8,006 car parking spaces. The area around the mall has been developed on the east and west sides of the road, with Westridge Court featuring over 30 stores on the Naperville side of Route 59. Other stores in the area include Meijer, Target, Guitar Center, Petsmart, At Home, Marshalls, Ross Stores, Dollar Tree, Jo-Ann Fabrics (now closed), Burlington Coat Factory, and other retailers and restaurants.

== Gallery ==
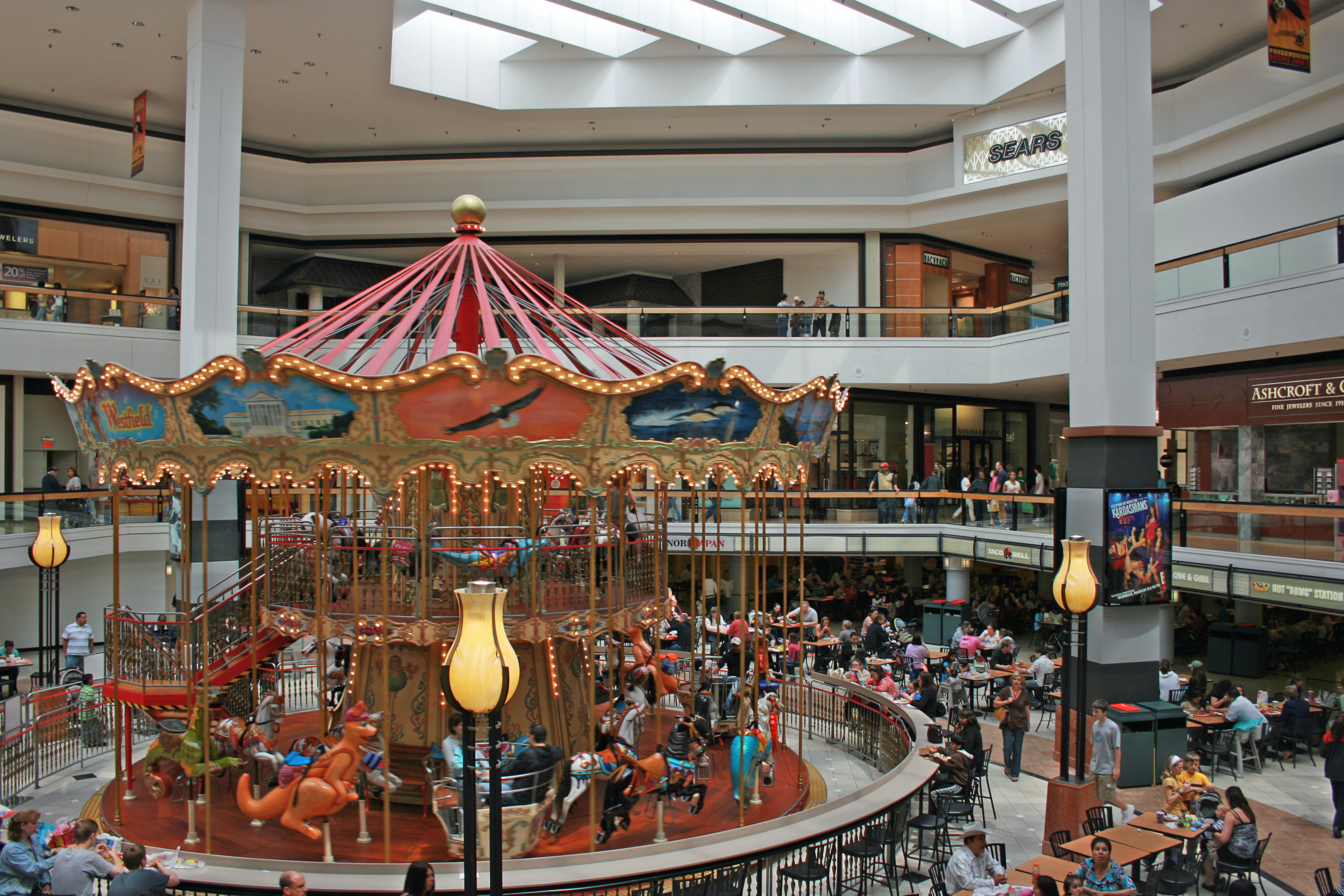
The carousel and food court

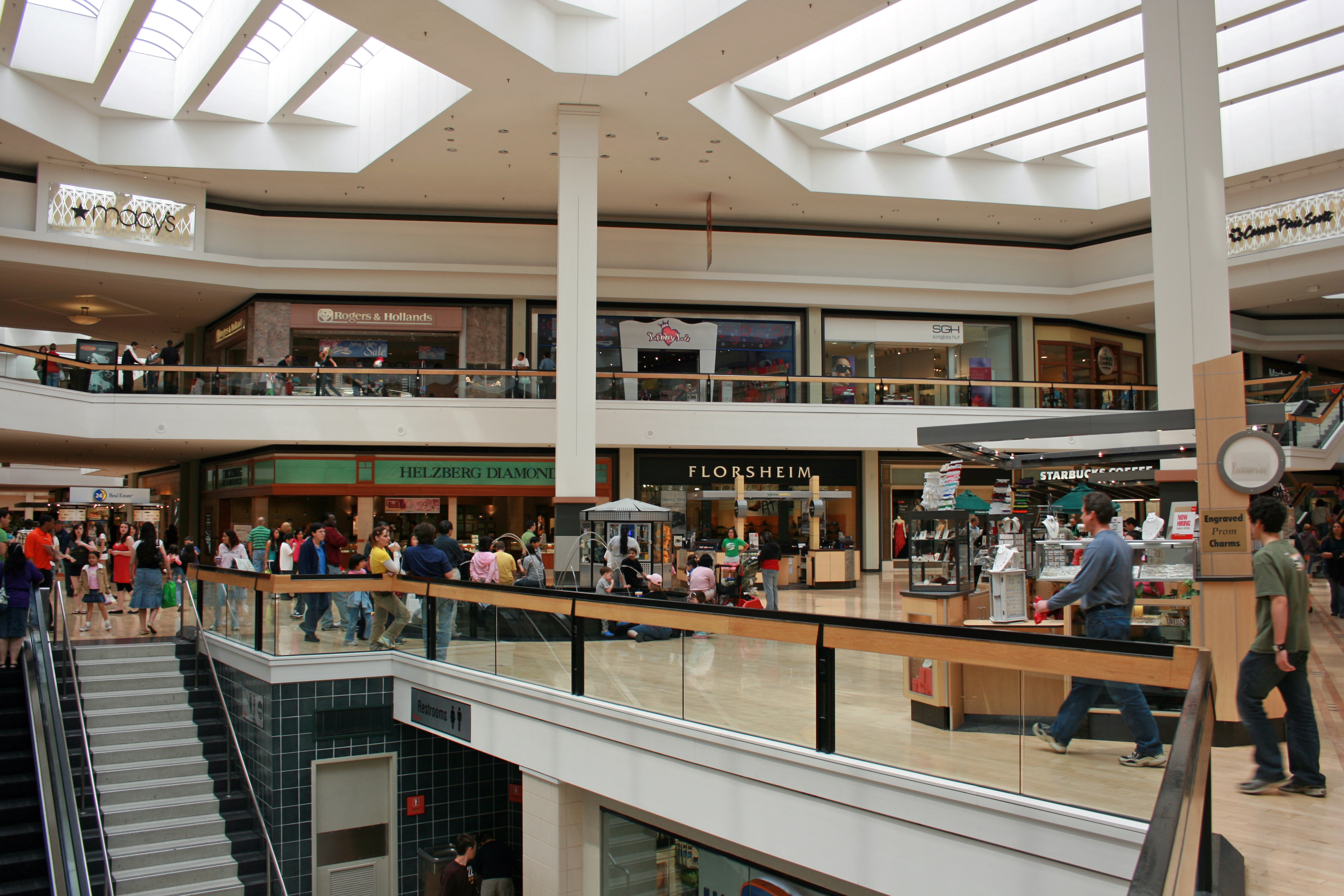
View from the lower level

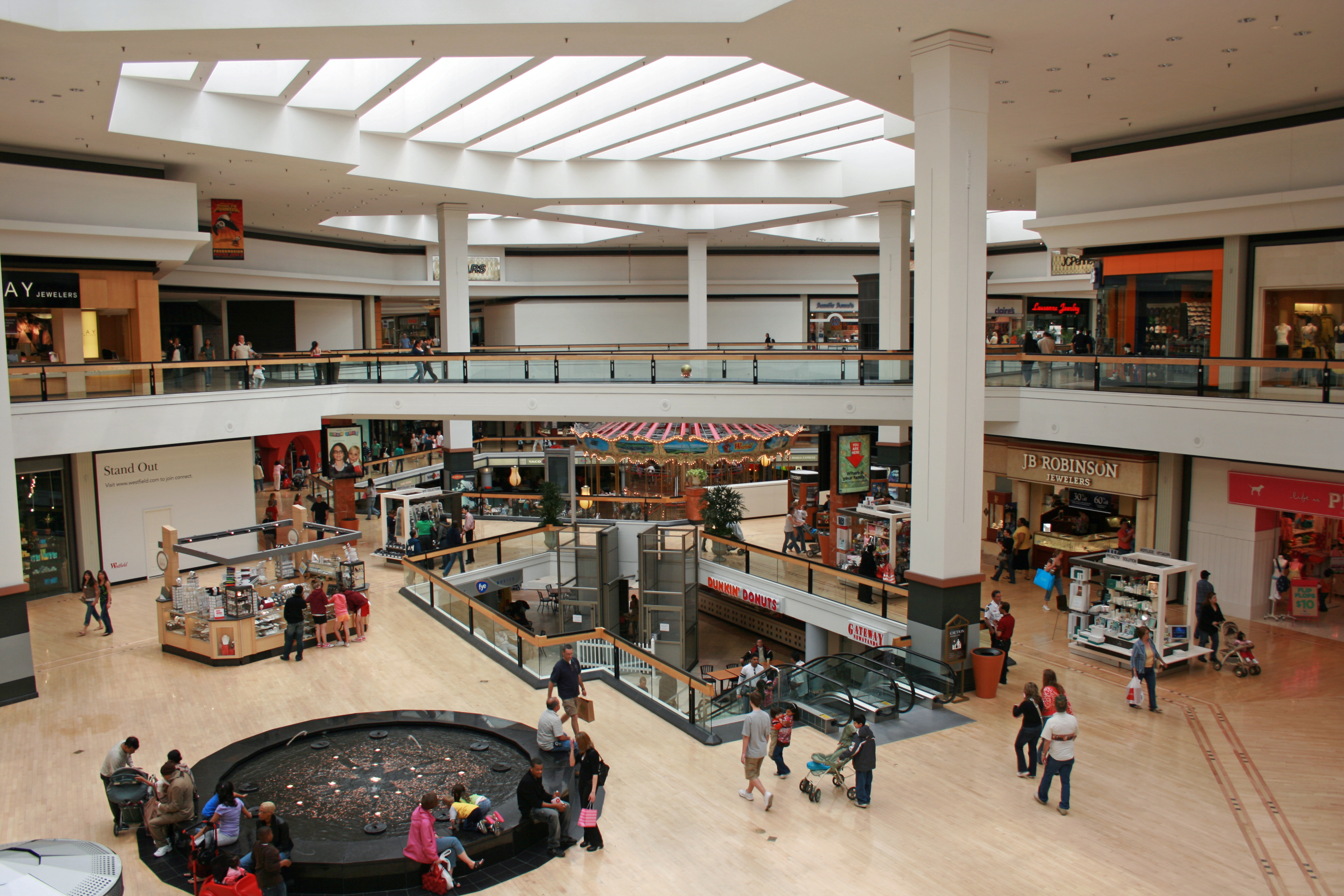
View from the upper level looking down at the animated water fountain

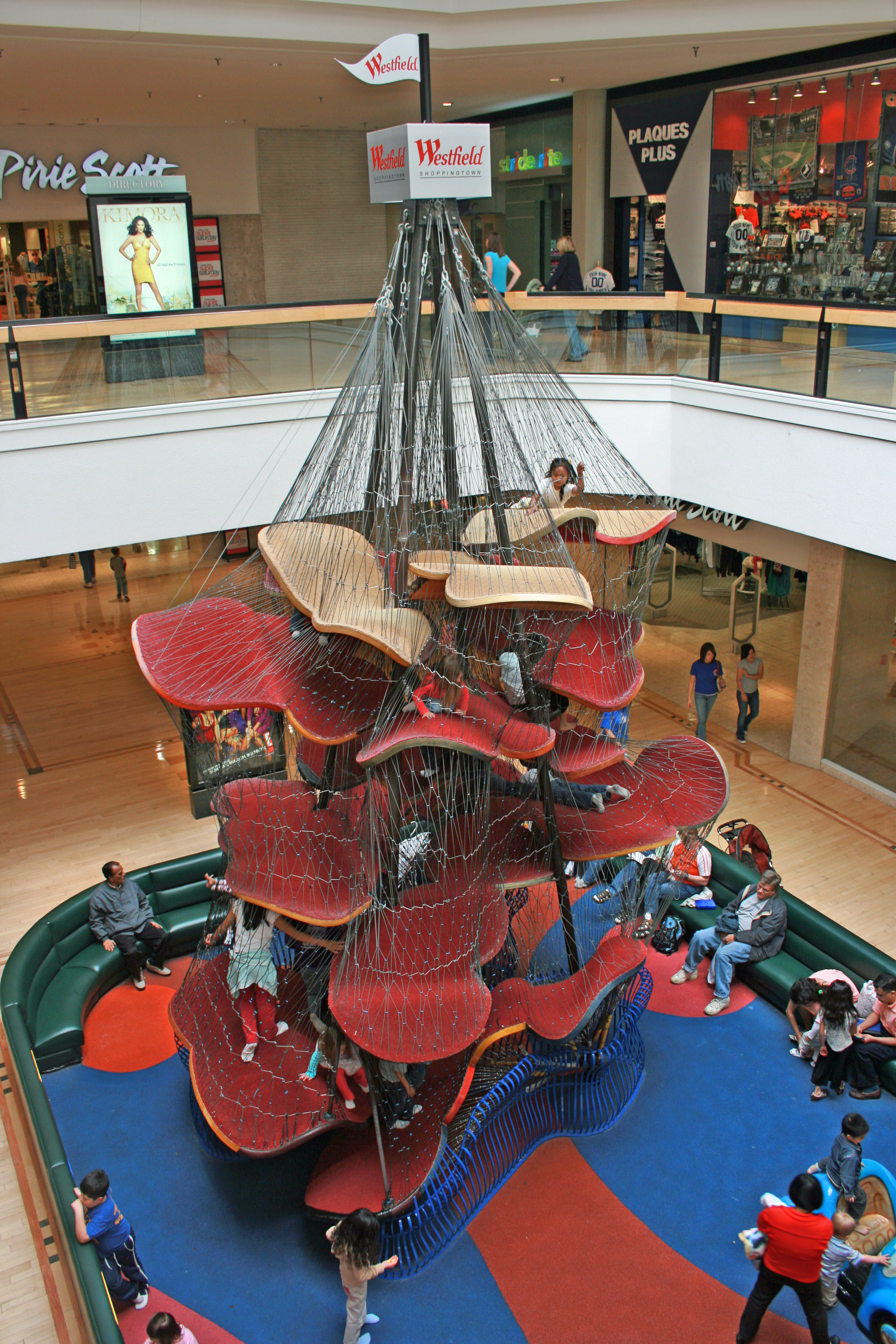
A Luckey Climber in the children's play area

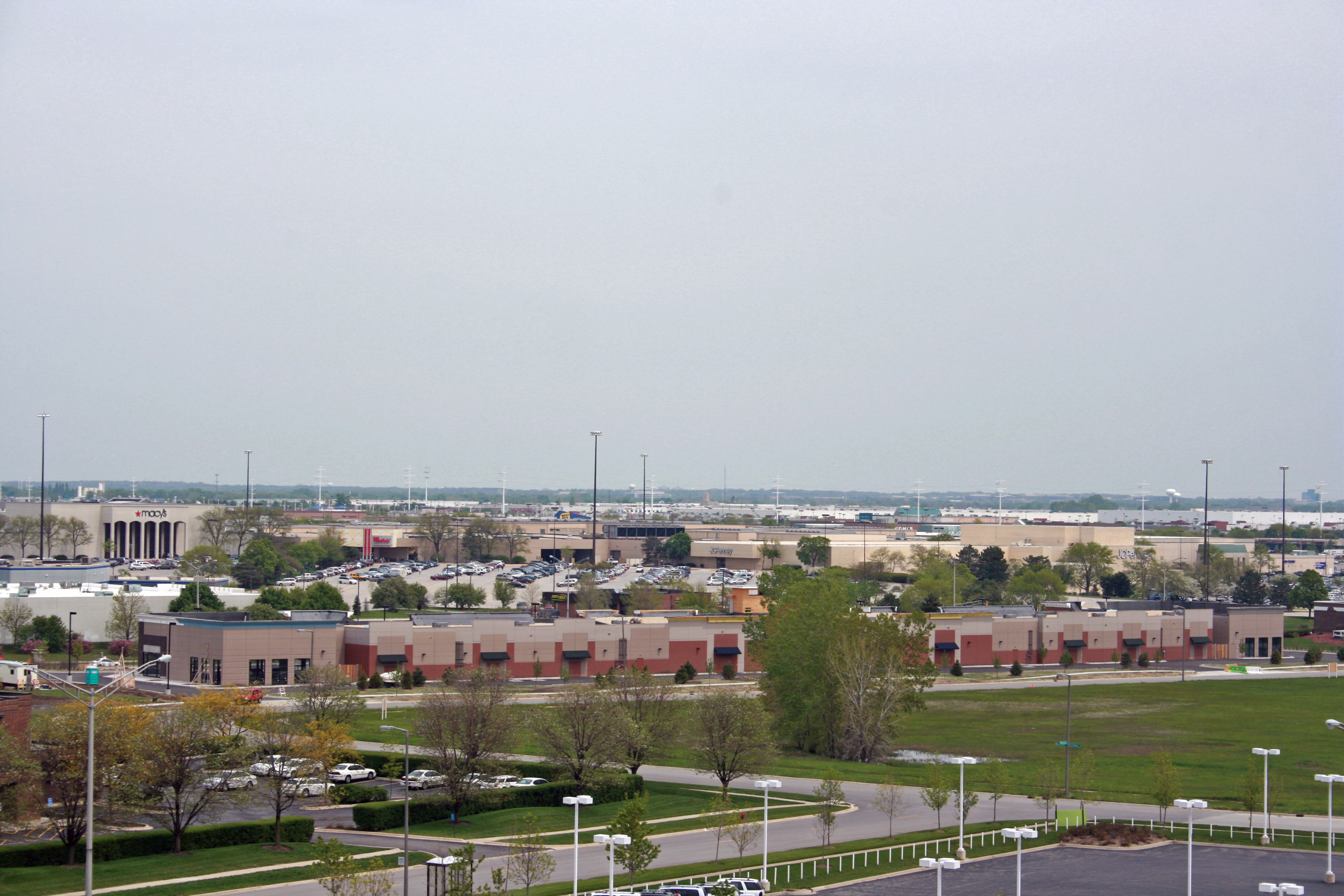
Distant view from the Southwest

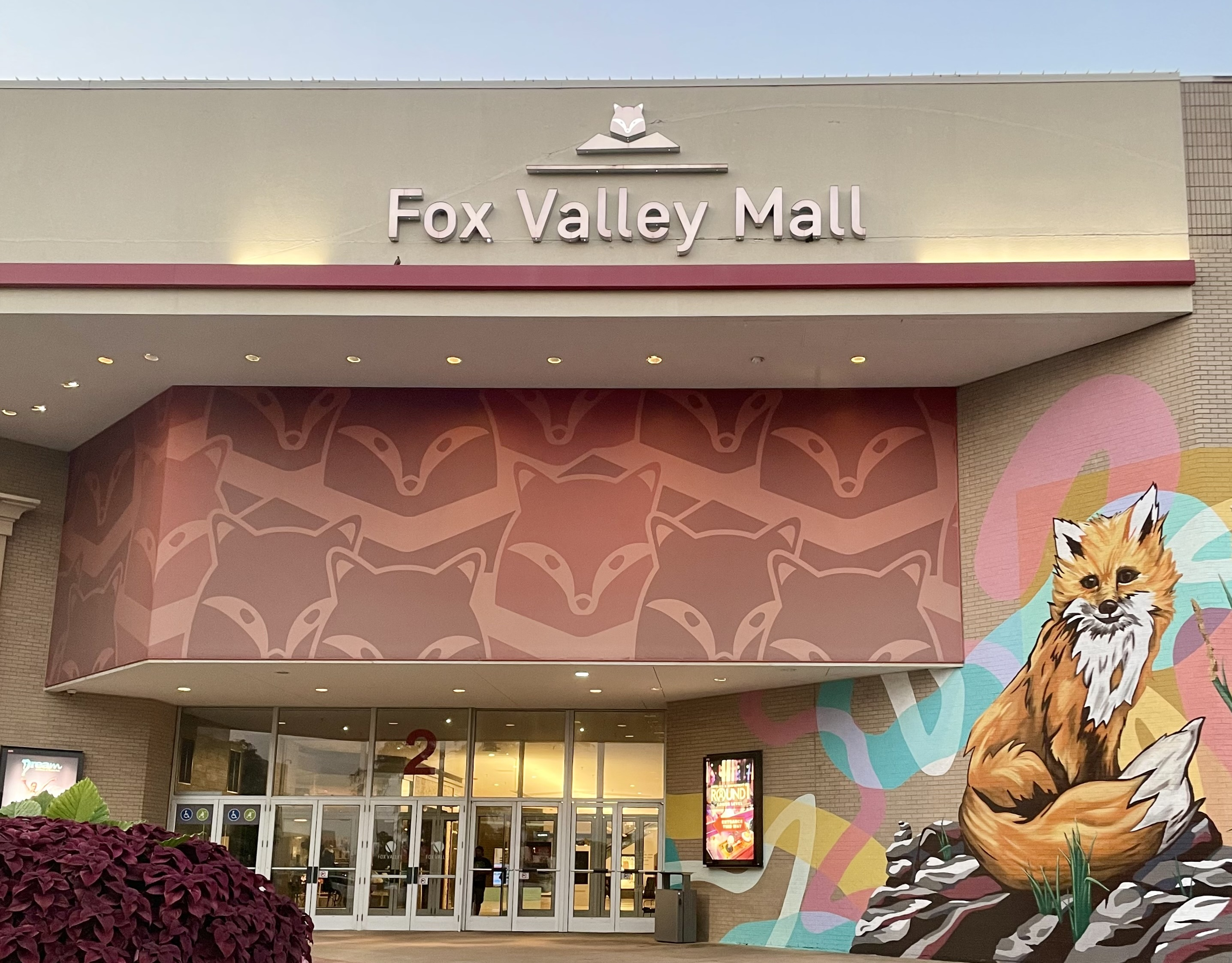
View of entrance 2
