= Leckey =

Leckey is a surname. Notable people with the surname include:

- Dolores R. Leckey (1933–2023), founding director of the Secretariat for Family, Laity, Women, and Youth
- Mark Leckey (born 1964), British artist
- Nick Leckey (born 1982), American football player
- Robert Leckey (born 1975), Canadian law professor

== See also ==
- Lackey (surname)
- Lecky
- Luckey
