= Luckey =

Luckey is a surname. Notable people with the surname include:

== People ==
- Andy Luckey (born 1965), American television producer and author
- Bud Luckey (1934–2018), American cartoonist and animator
- Diane Luckey (1960–2022), American singer
- Henry Carl Luckey (1868–1956), American politician
- Hugh M. Luckey (1873–1946), American farmer and politician
- Lillian Luckey (1919–2021), All-American Girls Professional Baseball League player
- Palmer Luckey (born 1992), American entrepreneur, founder of Oculus VR and designer of the Oculus Rift
- Spencer Luckey (born 1970), American sculptor and architect of children's climbing structures
- Susan Luckey (1938–2012), American actress
- Tom Luckey (1940–2012), American architect and sculptor

== Fictional characters ==
- Dennis Luckey, on the American TV series The Leftovers

== See also ==
- Lucky (disambiguation)
