= Stephanie Tavares-Rance =

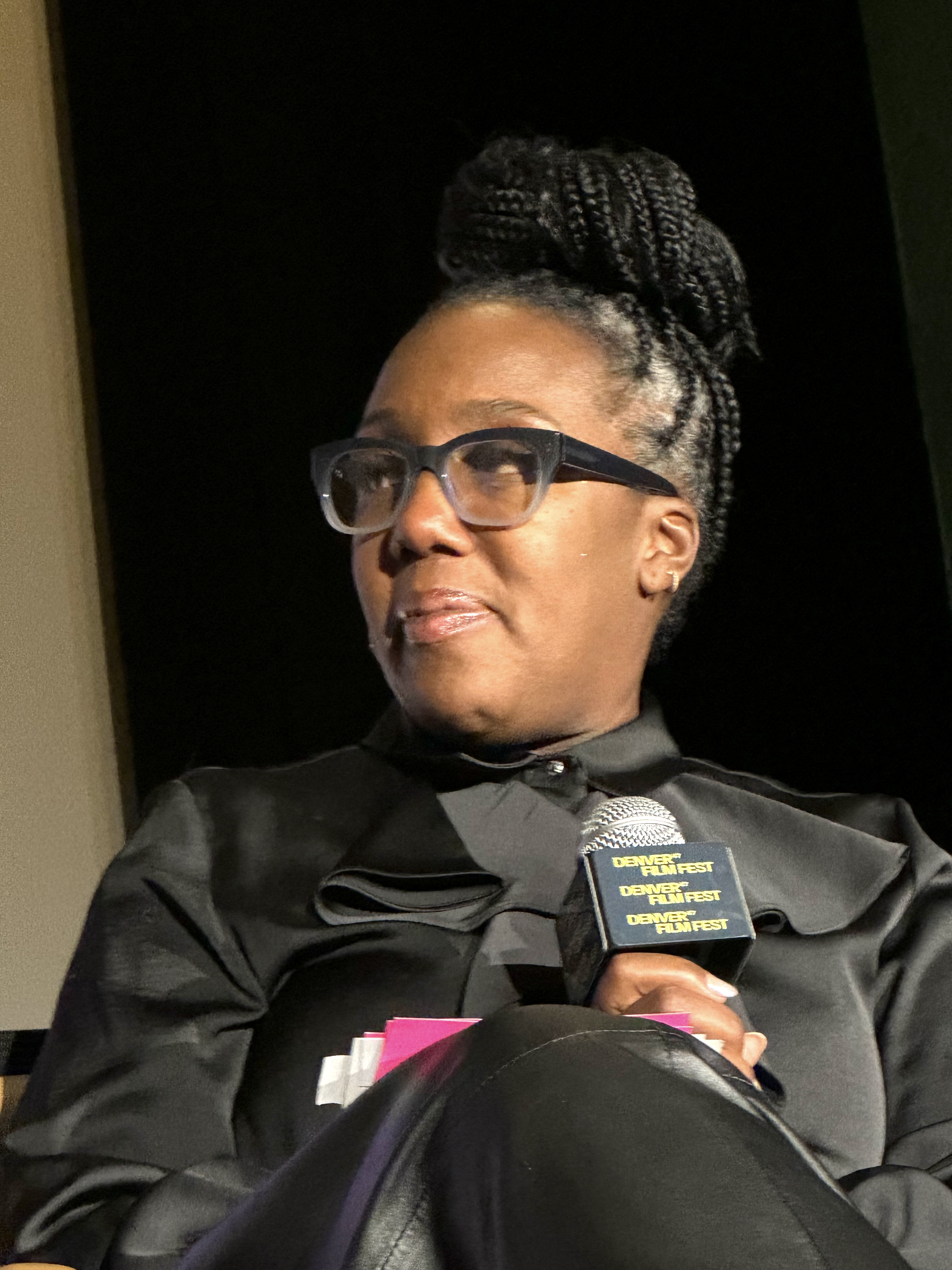
- Stephanie Tavares-Rance at the 2025 Denver Film Festival
- Occupation: Film festival founder
- Organization: Martha's Vineyard African American Film Festival
- Spouse: Floyd Rance

Stephanie Tavares-Rance is one of the founders of the Martha's Vineyard African American Film Festival, along with her husband, Floyd Rance.

The festival, which takes place in August in the town of Oak Bluffs, is now widely seen as a magnet for the American black elite.

Former president Barack Obama has credited the couple and the festival for elevating Black storytelling. In 2022, while introducing a movie at the festival he said, “One of the powers of this festival, and the work that the Rances have done, is to lift up stories that too often have been lost in the flow of time.”

== Career ==
Tavarnes-Rance studied fashion merchandising at Pratt Institute, started her career at SBK Records, and had done event planning for Martell Cognac. She was also the director of public relations and then started her own marketing firm. In the early 2000s she was working in marketing while her husband was a filmmaker. At the time, they lived in Brooklyn, New York and decided to organize a one-time film festival in Barbados, where Floyd Rance was filming a movie. But after 9/11 attacks, they could not hold the festival overseas and instead moved it to Martha's Vineyard, where the two had a number of contacts.

The first film festival was modest, with minimal promotion or marketing, attracting just half a dozen people in a conference room, the couple told The Washington Post. Deciding to persist, she and Rance moved the festival to smaller venues until it attracted significant interest, with over 2,000 attendees participating by 2017.

In August 2017, the couple were awarded with a citation from the State of Massachusetts Governor's Office for their contributions to the economy of Martha's Vineyard.
