= Kaleideum =

- Location of the museum
- Established: July 1, 2016
- Location: Winston-Salem, North Carolina
- Coordinates: 36.0915034°N 80.2438006°W
- Type: Children's museum, Science centre
- Visitors: 200,000 annually
- Website: kaleideum.org

Kaleideum in Winston-Salem, North Carolina was created from the July 2016 merger of Children's Museum of Winston-Salem and SciWorks, the Science Center and Environmental Park of Forsyth County. The two old properties were closed in December 2023, and the new unified museum opened in downtown Winston-Salem on February 7, 2024.

== History ==
=== Nature Science Center & SciWorks ===
Kaleideum North began in 1964 as the Nature Science Center, started by the local Junior League; the museum was originally housed in a barn at Reynolda Village. In 1972, the Nature Science Center moved to its second location at 400 West Hanes Mill Road, into a campus that originally housed the Forsyth County Home and Hospital, the precursor to Forsyth Medical Center. In 1992, the Nature Science Center closed and underwent a major renovation, re-opening under the name SciWorks. In 2001, the museum upgraded the facilities by doubling the space of one of the main galleries and adding an indoor eating area to the building.

SciWorks consisted of a building with 30,000 square feet (2,800 m^{2}) of exhibit space, a 15-acre (61,000 m^{2}) environmental park, and a planetarium. The exhibit galleries covered a wide range of topics such as North Carolina geography and geology, the human body, physics (featuring a Foucault pendulum), sound, and technology. In addition, there was a traveling exhibit gallery that featured both nationally touring exhibits and exhibits created in-house. The BioWorks exhibit, focusing on animals both local and exotic, was renovated in 2010.

The environmental park featured white-tailed deer and river otters, as well as a barnyard that had donkeys, sheep, and cows. It also had outdoor exhibits on sound and fluids, as well as a garden of native vegetation. The museum ran several interactive education programs for elementary and middle school students. and offered special summer camps, as well as camp-ins for Boy Scouts and Girl Scouts.

=== The Children's Museum of Winston-Salem ===
The former logo for the Kaleideum from when it was the Children's Museum.

The Children's Museum of Winston-Salem, later renamed to Kaleideum Downtown after the merger deal, was originally located at 390 South Liberty Street in Winston-Salem. The museum was created by the Junior League of Winston-Salem as a gift to the city to celebrate the league's 75th anniversary. The museum opened its doors during November 2004 as a safe place for young children and their families to learn and play together. Designed with a literature-based theme, the museum focused on experiential learning and the educational benefits of play through literature, storytelling, and the arts, while offering birthday parties, summer camps, field trips, workshops, storytime programming, theatre performances, and special community events. The Junior League pledged that 10 percent of its active members would volunteer at the museum until at least 2020.

In November 2014, the Children's Museum acquired Peppercorn Theatre, which was founded in 2010 by John Bowhers and Anna Rooney. Peppercorn became a programming arm of the museum and produces high quality, original theatre works and puppet shows to entertain and educate.

Kaleideum Downtown featured many permanent and rotating exhibits. The permanent exhibits include: "Kaleidoscape", a crocheted climbing structure by fiber artist Toshiko MacAdam; two multi-level climbing structures by playground designer Tom Luckey; "The Enchanted Forest", an imaginative play area with a folklore theme; "The Amazing Library", a library for young readers; "Food Lion Supermarket", a child-sized supermarket area with plush food; "Amazing Airways", a series of air tubes that are designed to allow children to test hypotheses about air flow; " The Prop Shop", a recreated theater backstage that provides craft materials and suggested art activities; and "Krispy Kreme Doughnut Factory", a recreated doughnut assembly line and delivery truck.

== Merger between Children's Museum and SciWorks ==
Due to cost issues with both museums, a merger between the Children's Museum and SciWorks was first discussed in 2015. In July 2016 they officially merged, and Forsyth County commissioners approved $17 million for a new museum building where the sheriff's office used to be. On February 7, 2017, the name Kaleideum, combining kaleidoscope and museum, was announced for the museum.

Kaleideum announced on July 6, 2017, that Stitch Design Shop and Gensler would be the architectural firms designing its new building.

On June 24, 2021, Forsyth County commissioners approved spending as much as $27.2 million on the new four-story building. The grand opening of the $48 million museum took place February 17, 2024.

== Current Location ==
The new four-story museum downtown features several newly designed exhibit halls that contain a mix of new attractions as well as old favorite features brought in from the two older museums. By Design encourages creativity through construction toys and computer simulations. In Motion features interactive exhibits and toys revolving around energy, motion, and physics. Feature Hall features rotating and traveling exhibits every six months; past exhibits have included topics like healthy feelings, winter weather, and old-time toys. Storytelling is designed around language, creative writing, plays, puppets, and film. Wonders of Water features several interactive water features to play with the properties of fluids and learn about aquatic habitats. Our Nature has information on animals, habitats, and wild environments. The Try-It Studio includes puzzles, crafts, and quieter activities that encourage fine motor skills and analytical thinking.

In addition to the regular exhibits, Kaleideum also boasts a Digital Dome for planetarium shows, laser shows, and films; the Rooftop Adventure, a large outdoor playground covering two stories; and several Learning Labs for activities and classes with a special focus. There is also an in-house eatery, the Kaleidoscope Cafe.
