= Martha's Vineyard African American Film Festival =

Festival with focus on Black storytelling

- Location: Oak Bluffs, Massachusetts, U.S.
- Founded: 2002; 24 years ago
- Most recent: 2025
- Festival date: Opening: 1 August 2025; Closing: 9 August 2025
- Language: English
- Website: www.mvaaff.com

Current: 23rd
- 24th 22nd

The Martha's Vineyard African American Film Festival is a film festival annually held in Oak Bluffs on Martha's Vineyard, Massachusetts, every August. It screens films with a curatorial focus on Black storytelling.

In addition to films, the festival hosts panels like the Color of Conversations series and throws events such as the annual White Party, Director’s Brunch, the Black Excellence Brunch, and the Women's C-Suite lunches.

== History ==
The festival was founded by Stephanie Tavares-Rance and Floyd Rance in 2002. Before then, Rance had been a filmmaker leading Run & Shoot Filmworks, while Tavares-Rance worked in marketing; In 2001, both of them were working on a film together in Barbados, after which Tavares-Rance thought about possible events to host there. A film festival was one of them, but Barbados withdrew itself from consideration as a site after the September 11 attacks. By 2002, they decided on Martha's Vineyard, which "was actually Plan B"; however, Tavares-Rance and Rance ultimately found it to be "the right plan" after all, given Martha's Vineyard's significance to the Black community. It was also inspired by a film screening at a house party in Martha's Vineyard organized by Tavares-Rance during the Fourth of July weekend in 2000.

The very first festival, in August 2002, was held in a local high school on Martha's Vineyard with ten attendees; the following year, it was moved to the Mansion House Inn. Since then, the festival has annually screened over 60 films, at the Performing Arts Center in Edgartown, and attracted numerous community and industry leaders in the Black community. Notable attendees include Barack and Michelle Obama, Eric Holder, Loretta Lynch, Charles Ogletree, Henry Louis Gates Jr., Khalil Gibran Muhammad, Slick Rick, Spike Lee, Jennifer Hudson, Natasha Rothwell, Gayle King, Ketanji Brown Jackson and Jasmine Crockett. Annual turnout is usually over 2,000 attendees.

As of 2018, Tavares-Rance also hosts a sister festival in Washington, D.C. The couple had also briefly hosted a spinoff festival in Charlotte, North Carolina for two years.

In 2020, the festival was hosted virtually on Facebook due to the COVID-19 pandemic.

During the 2023 SAG-AFTRA strike, the festival showcased the perspectives of choreographers and authors.

Starting in 2023, the Library of Congress began hosting on-site events and programming at the festival, largely based around the preservation of African American history and cinema, as well as the promotion of its Of the People program.

As of 2025, other festivals also held in Martha's Vineyard aimed at Black audiences during the first two weeks of August include the Martha's Vineyard Comedy Fest (since 2010) and the Black Book Festival (since 2024).

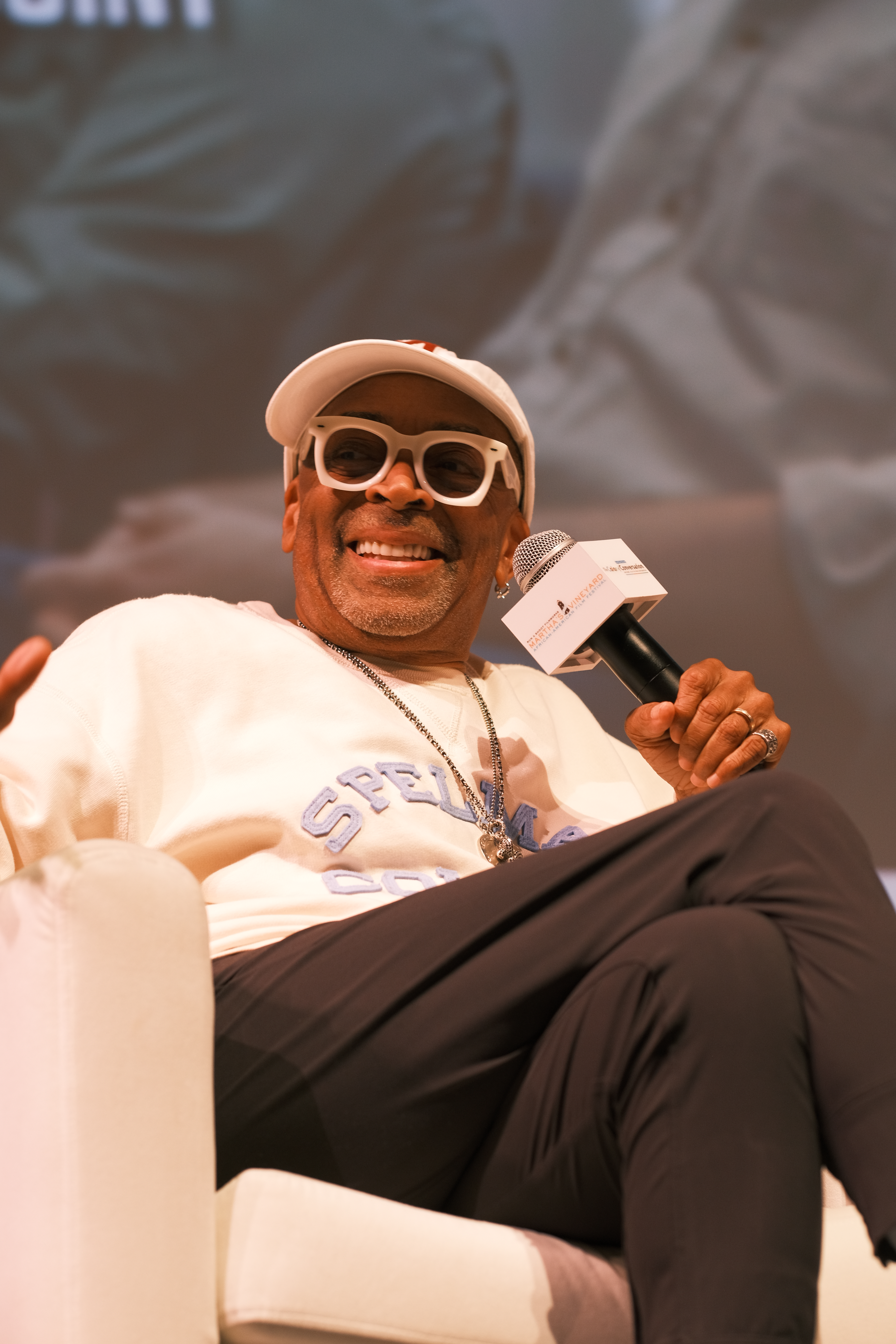
Spike Lee at 2025 MVAAFF

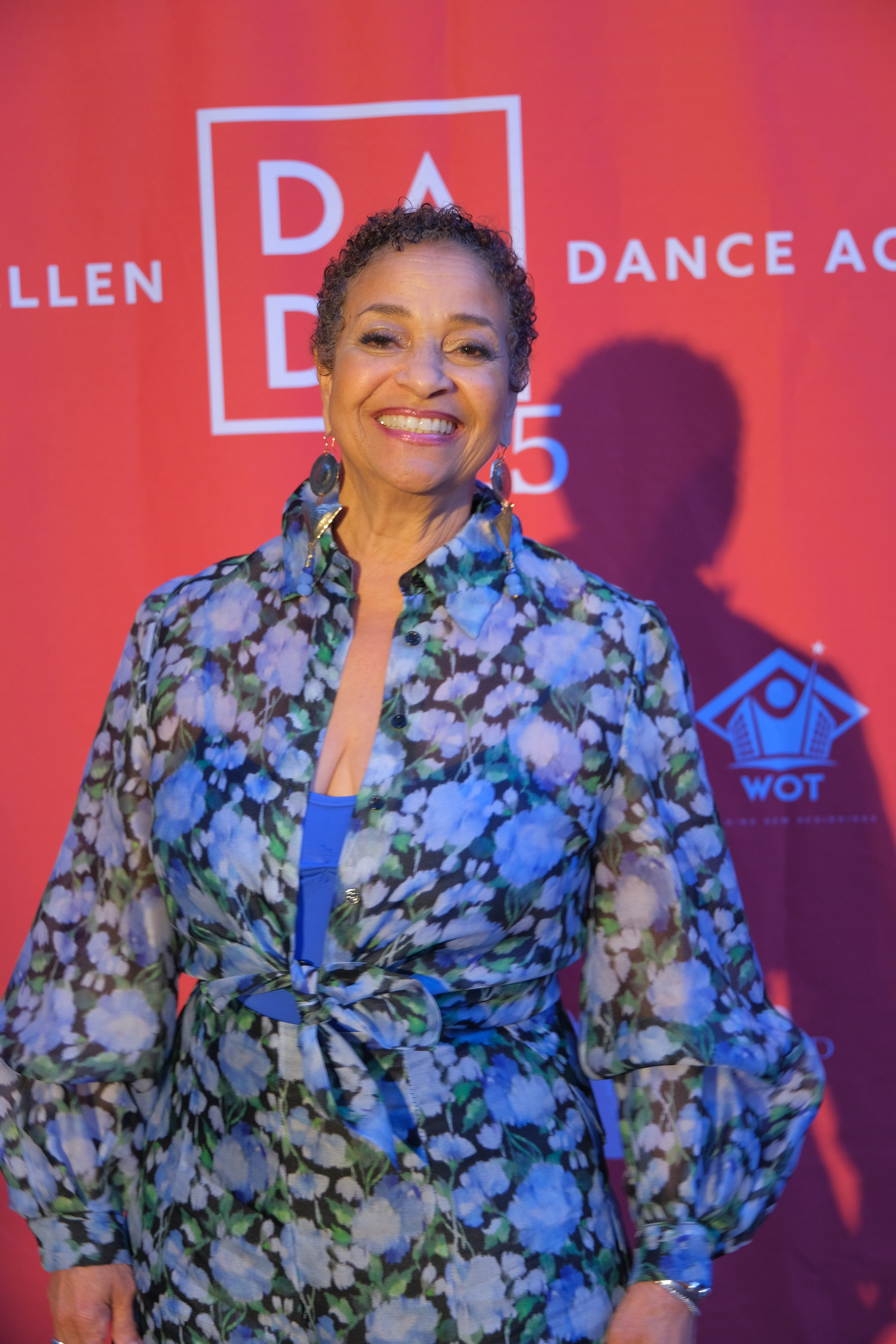
Debbie Allen at 2025 MVAAFF

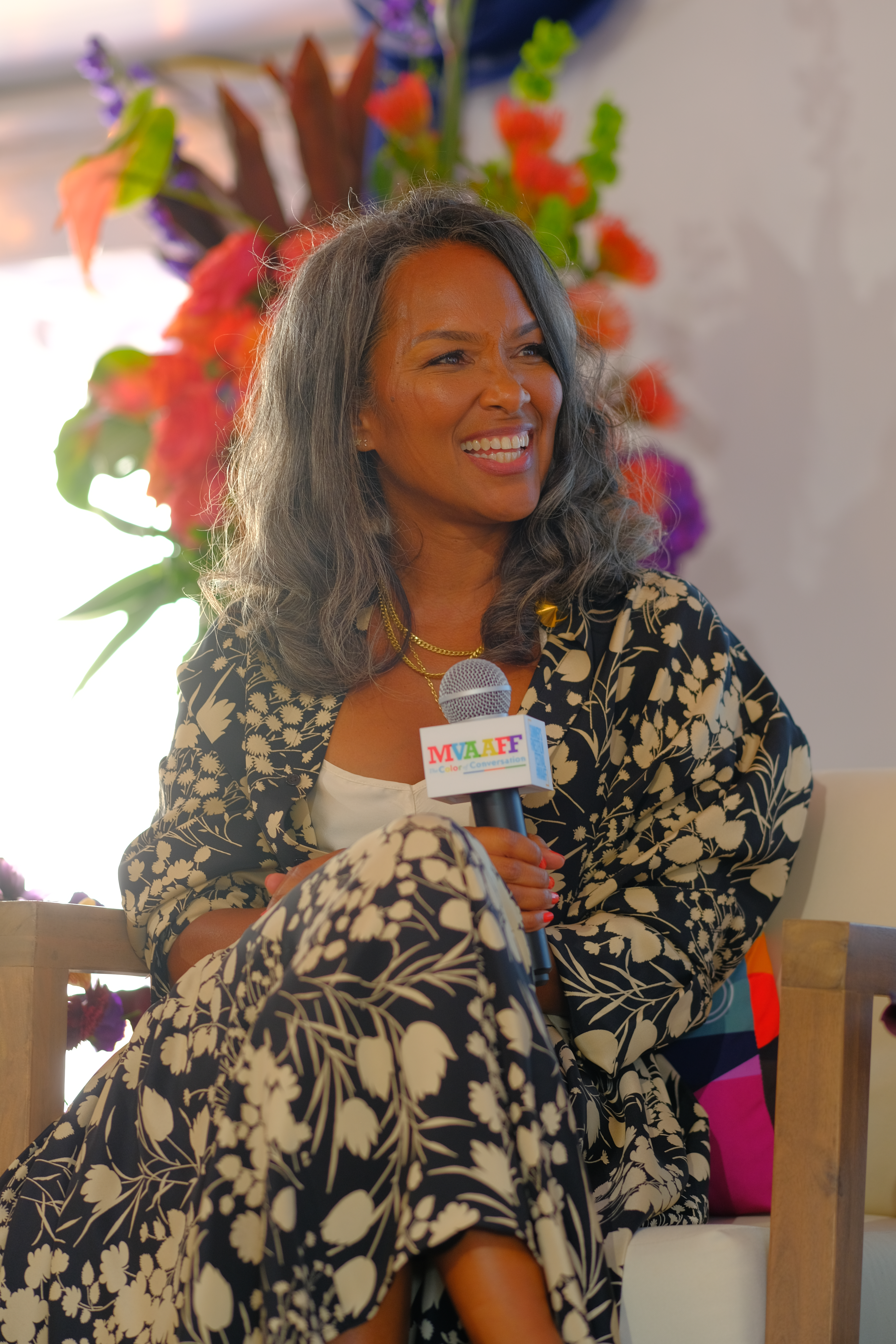
Mara Brock Akil at MVAAFF 2025

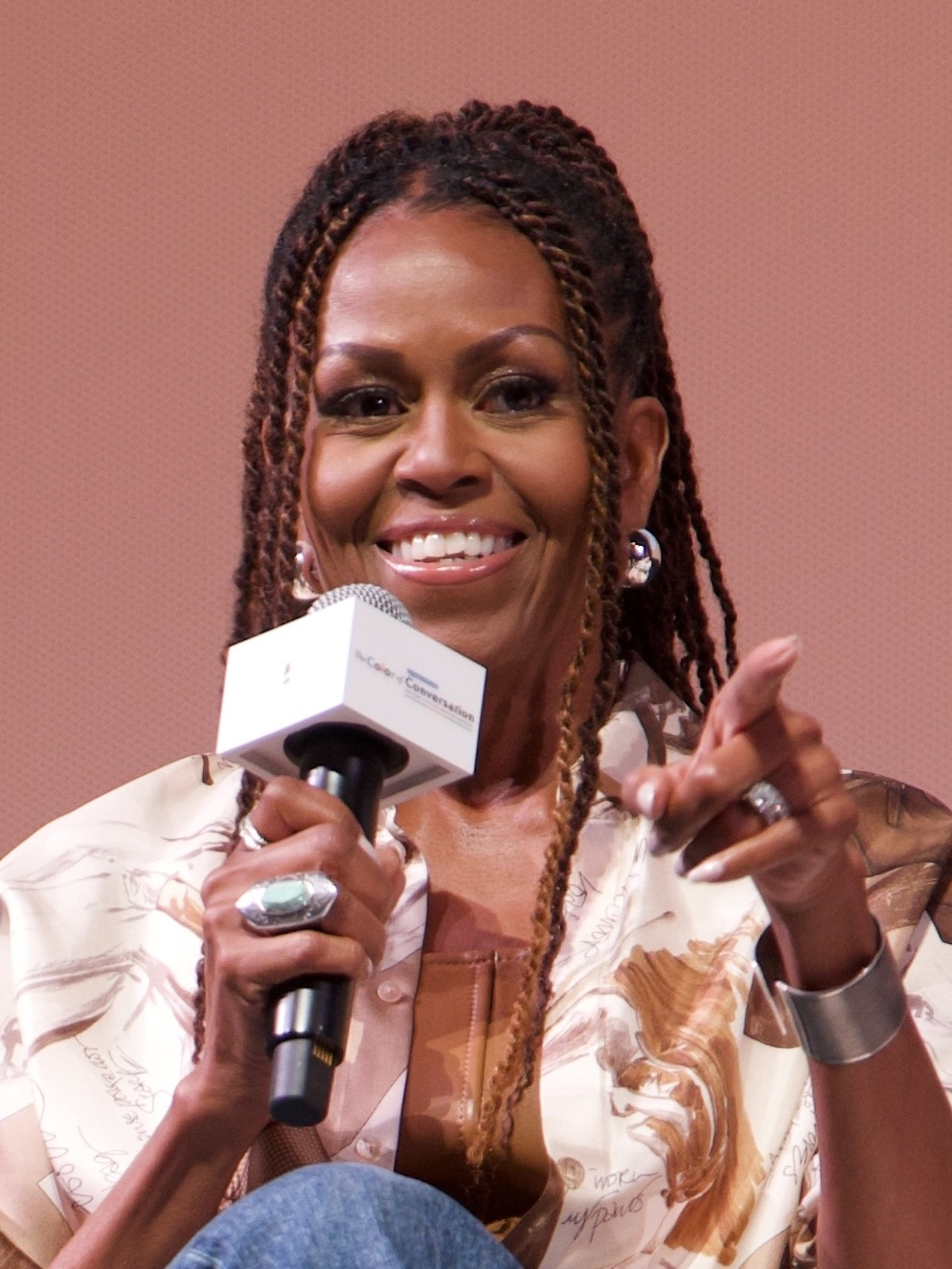
Michelle Obama at 2025 MVAAFF

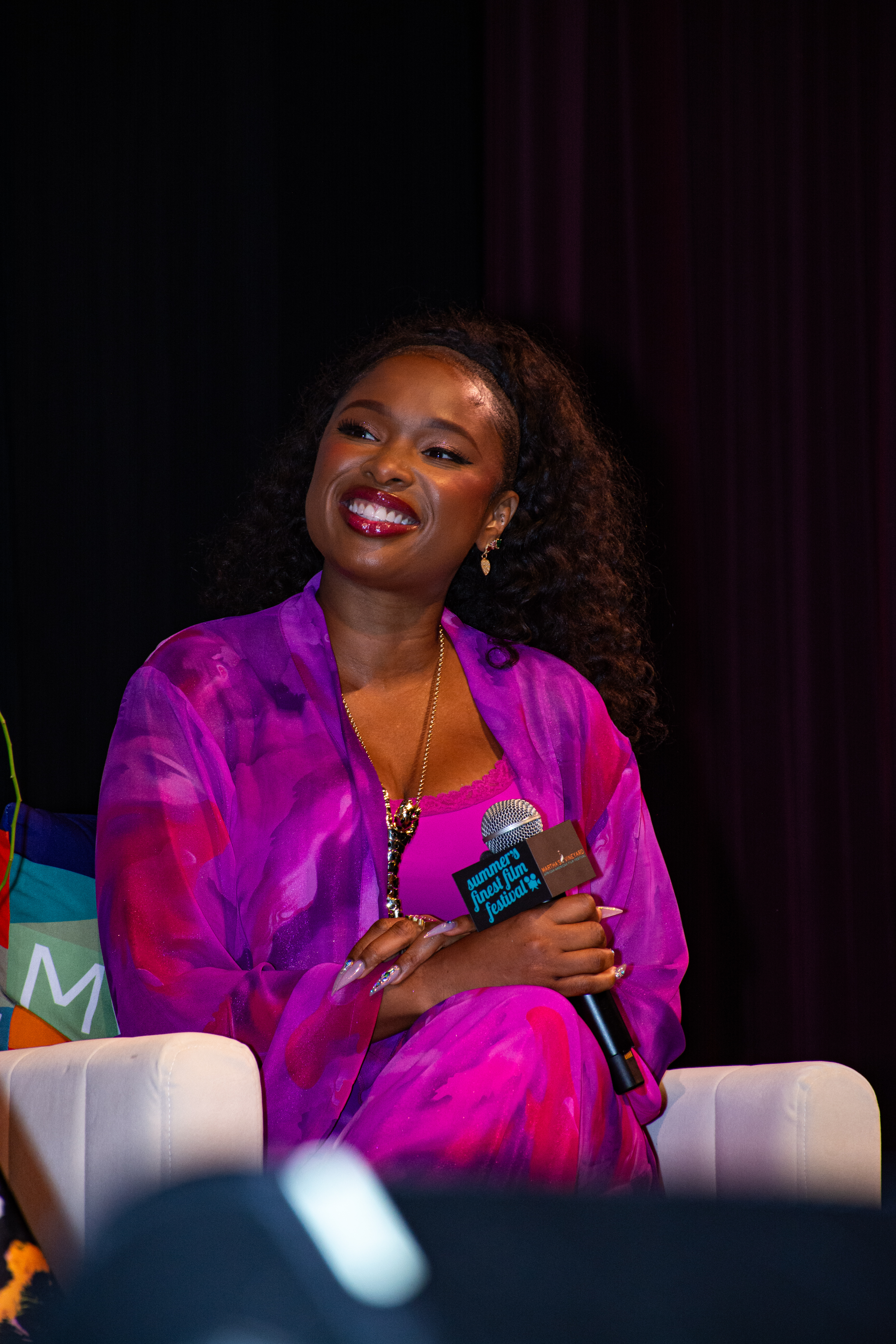
Jennifer Hudson at 2025 MVAAFF

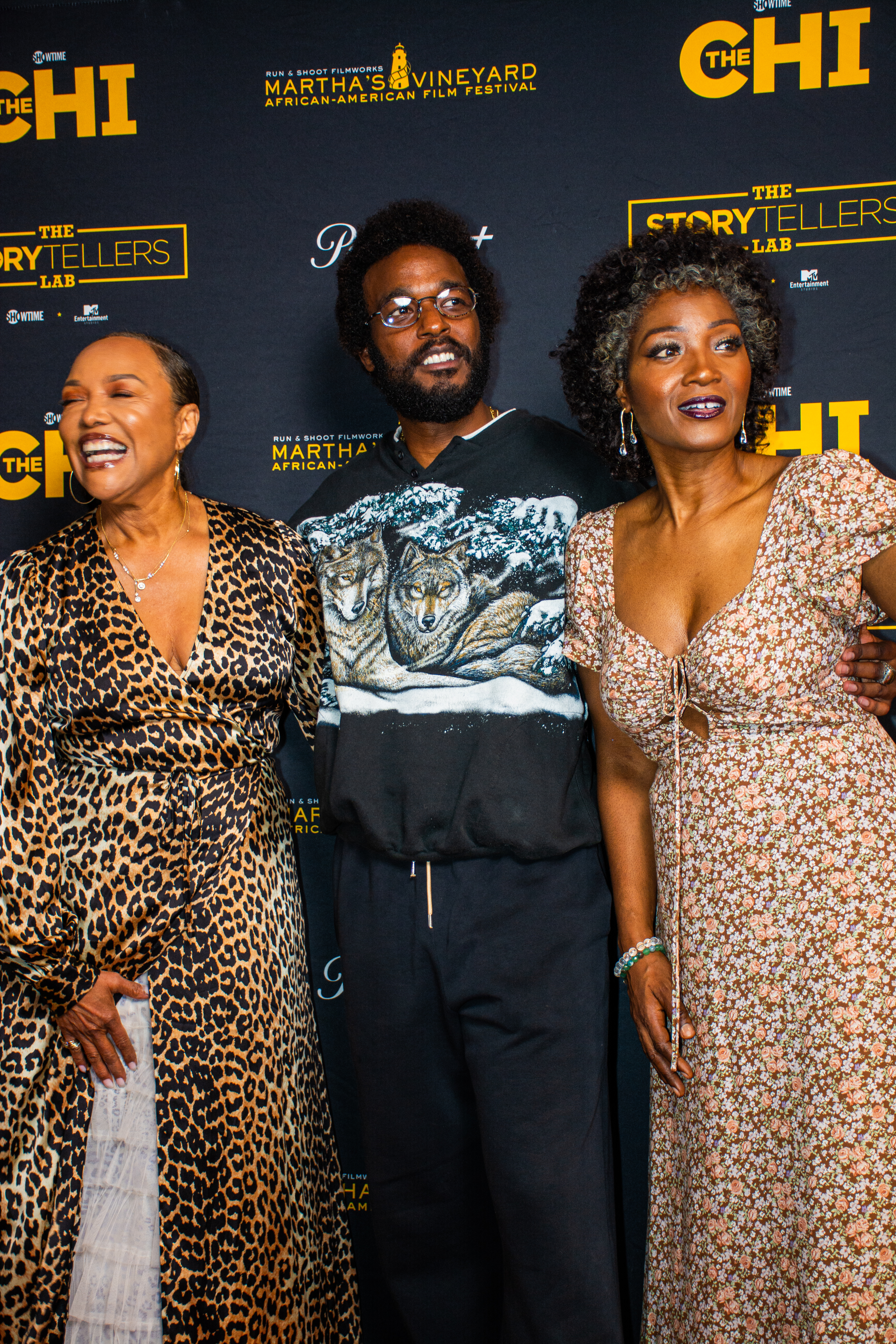
Cast of “The Chi” at 2025 MVAAFF

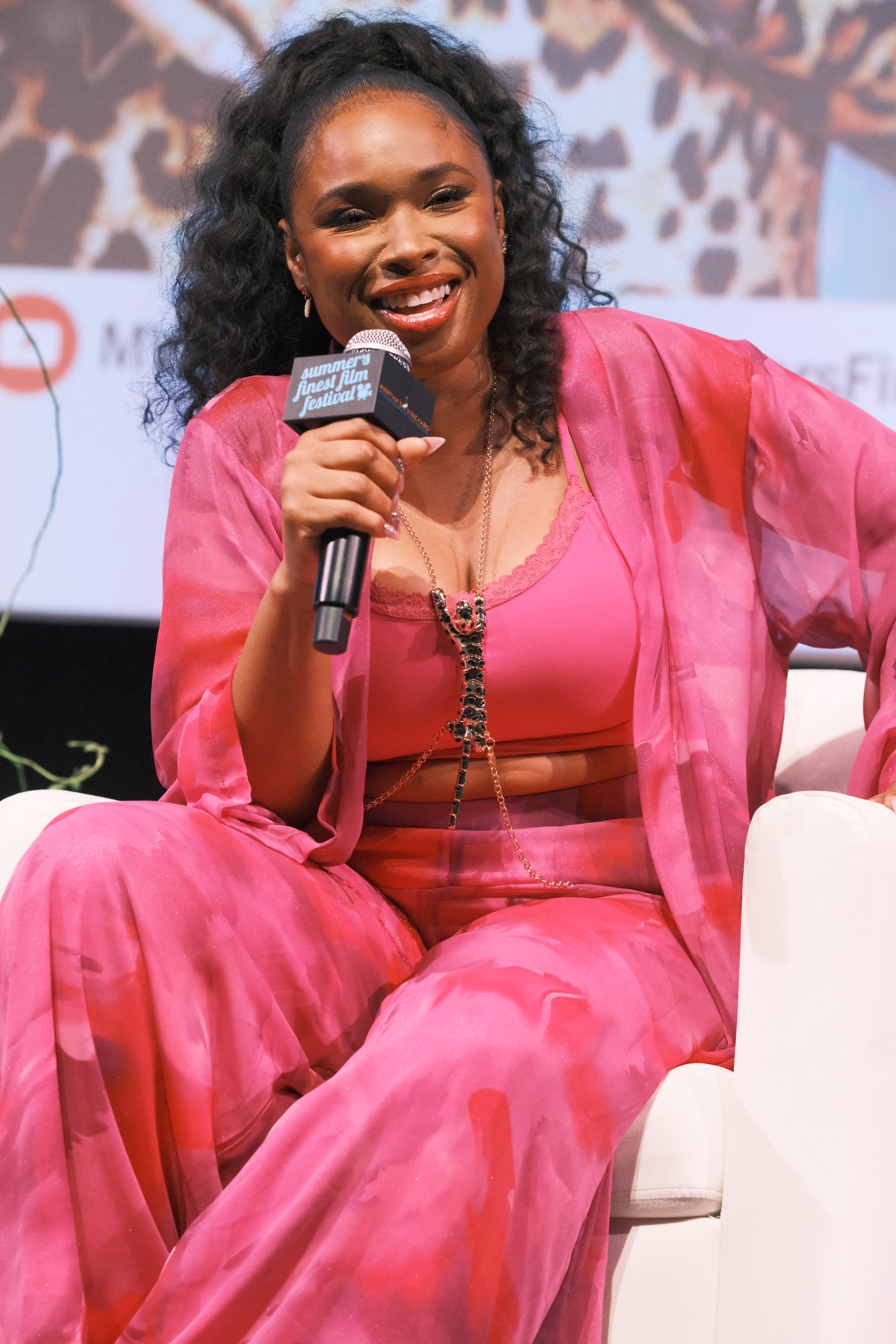
Jennifer Hudson at 2025 MVAAFF 2025

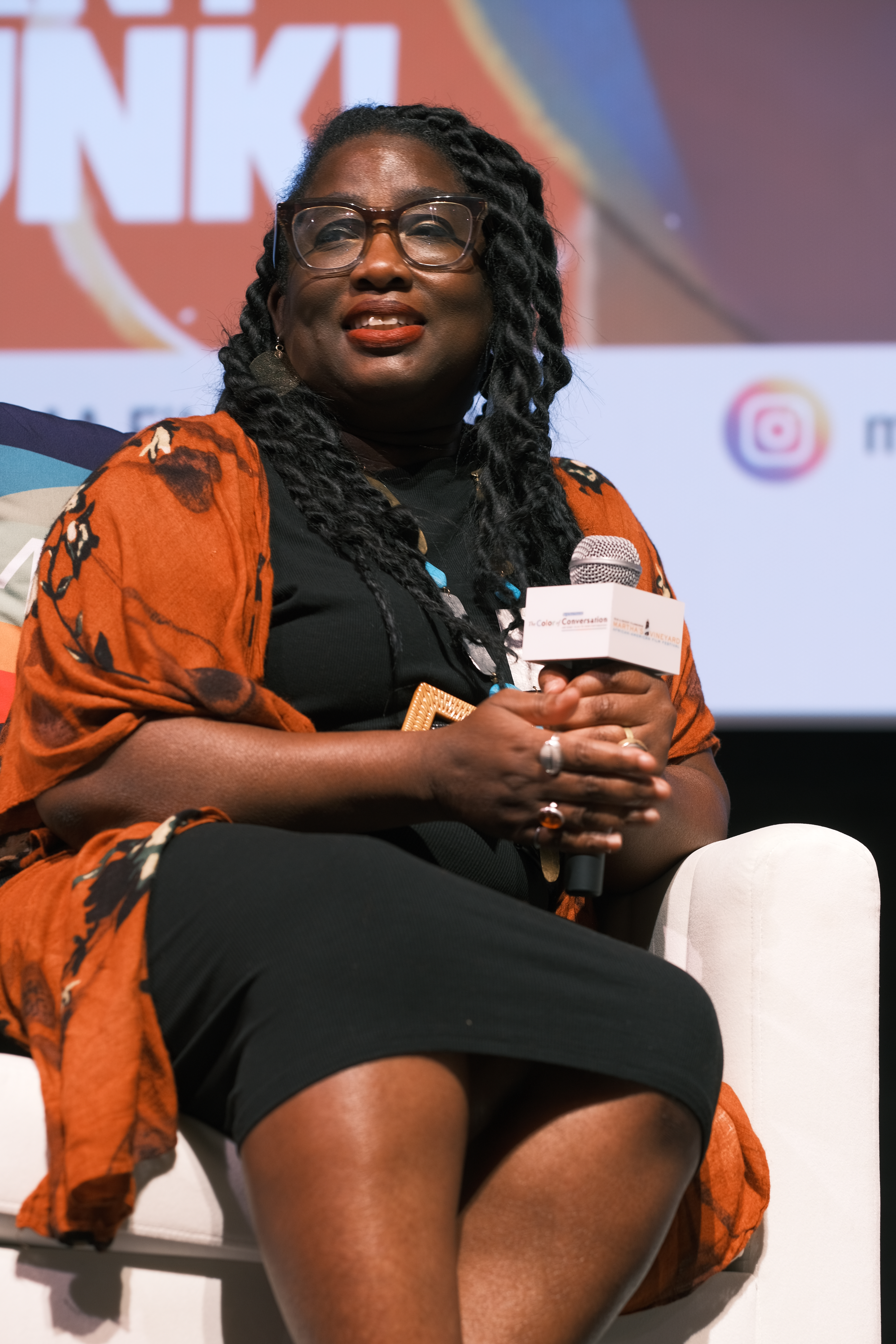
Nicole London 2025 MVAAFF

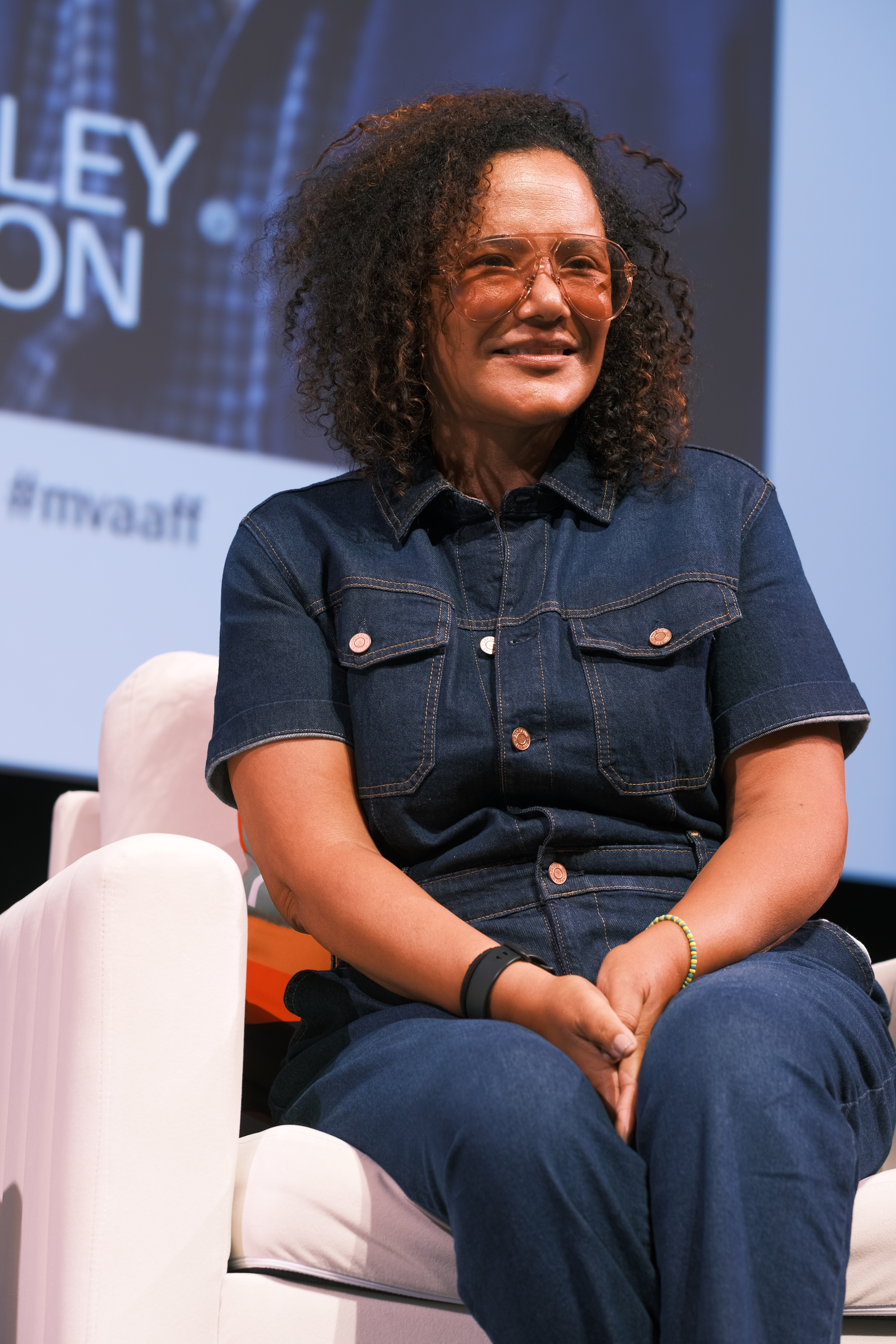
Dream Hampton at 2025 MVAAFF

== Criteria ==
Films submitted to the festival qualify for screening if they are either created by a writer, director or producer who self-identifies as a person of color; or if they cast people of color in prominent roles.

== Awards ==
Every year, the festival gives out prizes: Best Feature, Best Short Film, and Best Documentary.

As of 2018, the festival has been accredited by the Academy of Motion Picture Arts and Sciences as a qualifying festival for the short film category at the Oscars.

=== Winners ===
==== 2010 ====
- The Roe Effect
- Joy Road
- Good Intentions
- Race

==== 2024 ====
- Best Feature: Albany Road
- Best Short Film: Rebel Girls
- Best Documentary: A King Like Me

== Programming ==
There are many events that take place in addition to the screenings. The festival hosts numerous events each year, both official and off-site.

=== Color of Conversation ===
After film screenings, dialogue events are held, in which filmmakers and cast members speak about the preceding film amongst each other and answer questions.

=== White Party ===
At the festival, a White Party is thrown outdoors wherein guests must wear all-white.

=== Other activities ===
As of 2025, other activities at the festival include culinary events, theater, workshops, and children's programming.

== Notable films featured ==
=== 2002 ===
- The Murder of Emmett Till

=== 2003 ===
- 30 Years to Life
- Cuban Roots/Bronx Stories
- Crazy as Hell
- The Murder of Emmett Till

=== 2006 ===
- Idlewild

=== 2009 ===
- The Princess and the Frog

=== 2010 ===
- Breaking Up Is Hard to Do
- Everyday Black Man
- Tinker Bell

=== 2014 ===
- The Knick
- Black-ish
- A Ballerina's Tale
- Little White Lie

=== 2015 ===
- Mavis!
- Chi-Raq
- 3 1/2 Minutes, 10 Bullets
- Finding Samuel Lowe: From Harlem to China

=== 2016 ===
- The Birth of a Nation
- Southside with You
- Insecure

=== 2017 ===
- Marshall
- Detroit
- Crown Heights
- Rodney King
- She's Gotta Have It
- Insecure

=== 2018 ===
- Bruce!!!
- BlacKkKlansman
- United Skates
- Evolutionary Blues: West Oakland's Music Legacy
- The Carter Effect
- Mr. Soul!
- The Hate U Give
- Greenleaf
- Insecure
- If Beale Street Could Talk

=== 2019 ===
- The Black Godfather
- Godfather of Harlem
- First Wives Club
- Brian Banks
- Greenleaf
- Just Mercy
- David Makes Man
- The Remix: Hip Hop X Fashion
- The Apollo

=== 2021 ===
- Respect
- The Wonder Years
- Don't Go Tellin' Your Momma
- Passing
- I Promise
- Summer of Soul
- Blood Brothers: Malcolm X & Muhammad Ali
- All Boys Aren't Blue
- My Name Is Pauli Murray
- The Legend of the Underground
- Death of a Telemarketer
- The One and Only Dick Gregory
- Obama: In Pursuit of a More Perfect Union
- Our Kind of People

=== 2022 ===
- Power Book III: Raising Kanan
- Descendant
- Eve's Bayou
- Reasonable Doubt
- A Jazzman's Blues
- Aftershock
- From Scratch
- The Best Man: The Final Chapters
- Bel-Air
- Black Mothers Love & Resist
- Remember Me: The Mahalia Jackson Story
- Honk for Jesus. Save Your Soul.
- Katrina Babies
- The Hair Tales
- Till
- The Woman King

=== 2023 ===
- Ladies First: A Story of Women in Hip-Hop
- Stamped from the Beginning
- Black Barbie: A Documentary
- Fight the Power: How Hip-Hop Changed the World
- Rustin
- Going to Mars: The Nikki Giovanni Project
- Swagger
- The Changeling
- Young Love

=== 2024 ===
- Sing Sing
- Abbott Elementary
- She Taught Love
- How to Die Alone
- Stax: Soulsville U.S.A.
- The Supremes at Earl's All-You-Can-Eat
- The Emperor of Ocean Park
- Luther: Never Too Much
- Albany Road
- Fight Night: The Million Dollar Heist
- Cross

=== 2025 ===
- Highest 2 Lowest
- Love, Brooklyn
- The Disappearance of Miss Scott
- Invisible Beauty
- Sinners
- Magic City: An American Fantasy
- The Perfect Neighbor
- The Gilded Age
- Dave Chappelle: Live in Real Life
- Victory
- Forever
- Solo Traveling with Tracee Ellis Ross
