= Dr. Brinks & Dr. Brinks =

- Directed by: Josh Crockett
- Written by: Josh Crockett; Jonathan Pappas
- Produced by: Dan Riesser; Kristin Slaysman; Ted Speaker
- Starring: Scott Rodgers; Kristin Slaysman; Ashley Spillers; Robert Longstreet
- Cinematography: Daryl Pittman
- Edited by: Josh Crockett
- Music by: Donald Ian Black
- Production companies: Explosive Bolts Films; Cervidea Films; Salem Street Entertainment
- Distributed by: Gravitas Ventures
- Release dates: 4 May 2017 (Maryland Film Festival); 17 August 2018 (limited)
- Running time: 86 minutes
- Country: United States
- Language: English

Dr. Brinks & Dr. Brinks is a 2017 American comedy-drama film directed by Josh Crockett, starring Scott Rodgers, Kristin Slaysman, Ashley Spillers and Robert Longstreet.

== Premise ==
In this off-kilter comedy, estranged siblings Marcus & Michelle Brinks reunite after the death of their globe-trotting, aid-worker parents. The homecoming goes haywire when they choose to revel in dysfunction rather than face their grief.

== Cast ==
- Scott Rodgers as Marcus Brinks
- Kristin Slaysman as Michelle Brinks
- Ashley Spillers as Alex Brinks
- Robert Longstreet as Bill Tully
- Aalok Mehta as Reggie
- Craig Ng as Barry Joyce
- Anna Rose Hopkins as Connie
- Kate Freund as Pamela
- Donald Ian Black as Don
- DeMorge Brown as Mikey

== Release ==
The film was released in theatres in the United States on 17 August 2018.

== Reception ==
Chris Salce of Film Threat gave the film a score of 8/10 and wrote that it has a "very good" cast that "really fit together", as well as "pretty well-done cinematography, an interesting plot and a pretty decent script."

Gary M. Kramer of Salon.com wrote that the film "yields moments that are enjoyable and meaningful as the adept cast members play up their characters' foibles and insecurities", and that it "lands as a mostly successful tragicomedy."

Gary Goldstein of the Los Angeles Times called the film "uninvolving" and "ill-conceived" and wrote that it "plays more like a tedious, ad-hoc collection of indie-ironic scenes and moments than as any kind of fully baked narrative."

Frank Scheck of The Hollywood Reporter wrote that the film is "so understated in both its dramatic and comedic aspects that it fails to make any real impression whatsoever", but praised Slaysman's performance.
