= Tom Luckey =

American architect (1940–2012)

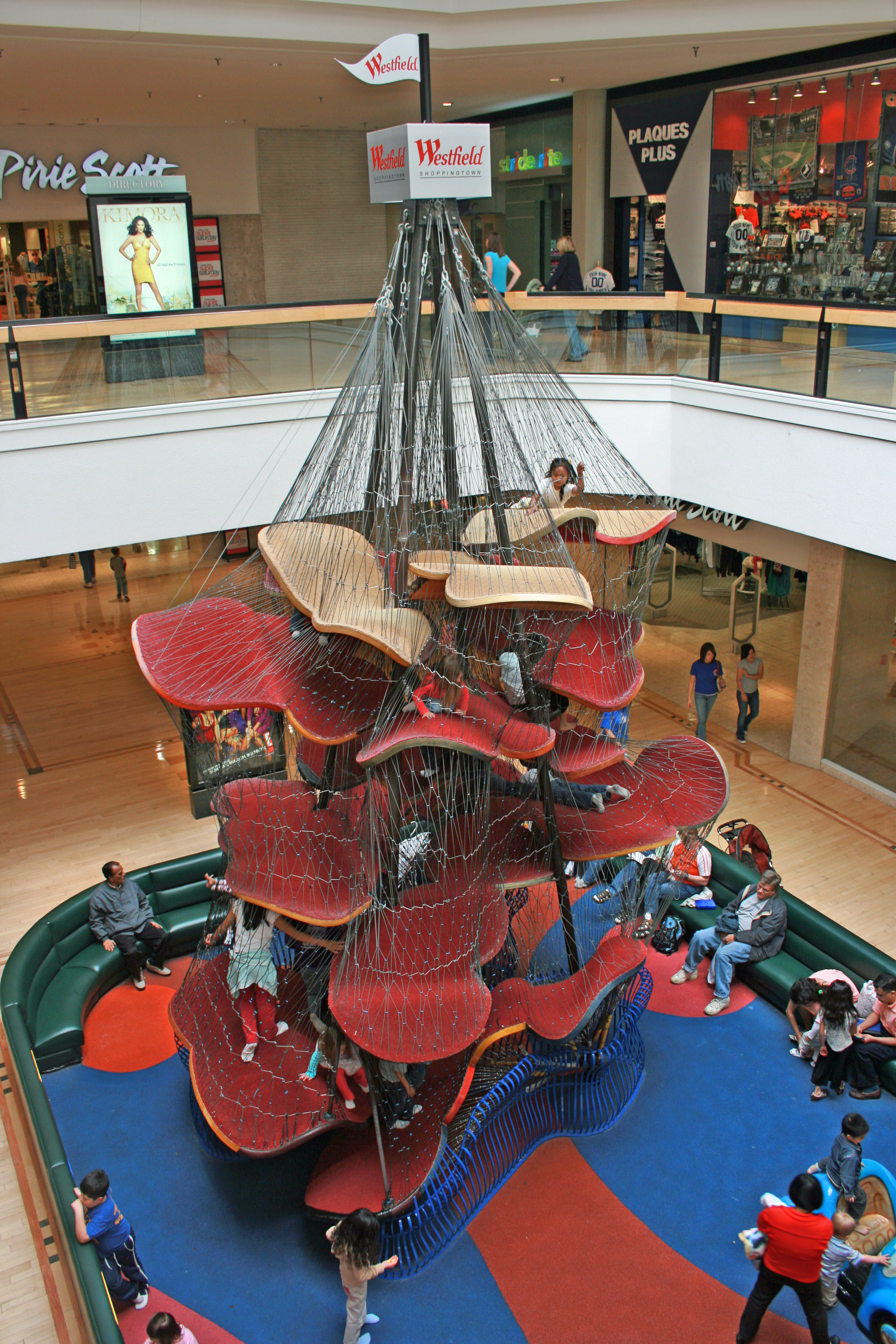
- Luckey Climber at Westfield Fox Valley
- Born: Thomas Walker Luckey; January 6, 1940; Quantico, VA
- Died: August 19, 2012 (aged 72); New Haven, CT
- Education: Yale School of Architecture
- Occupations: Architect, sculptor
- Known for: Luckey Climbers
- Spouse: Ettie
- Children: Spencer, Kit, Walker, Owen
- Parent: General Robert Luckey
- Website: www.luckeyclimbers.com

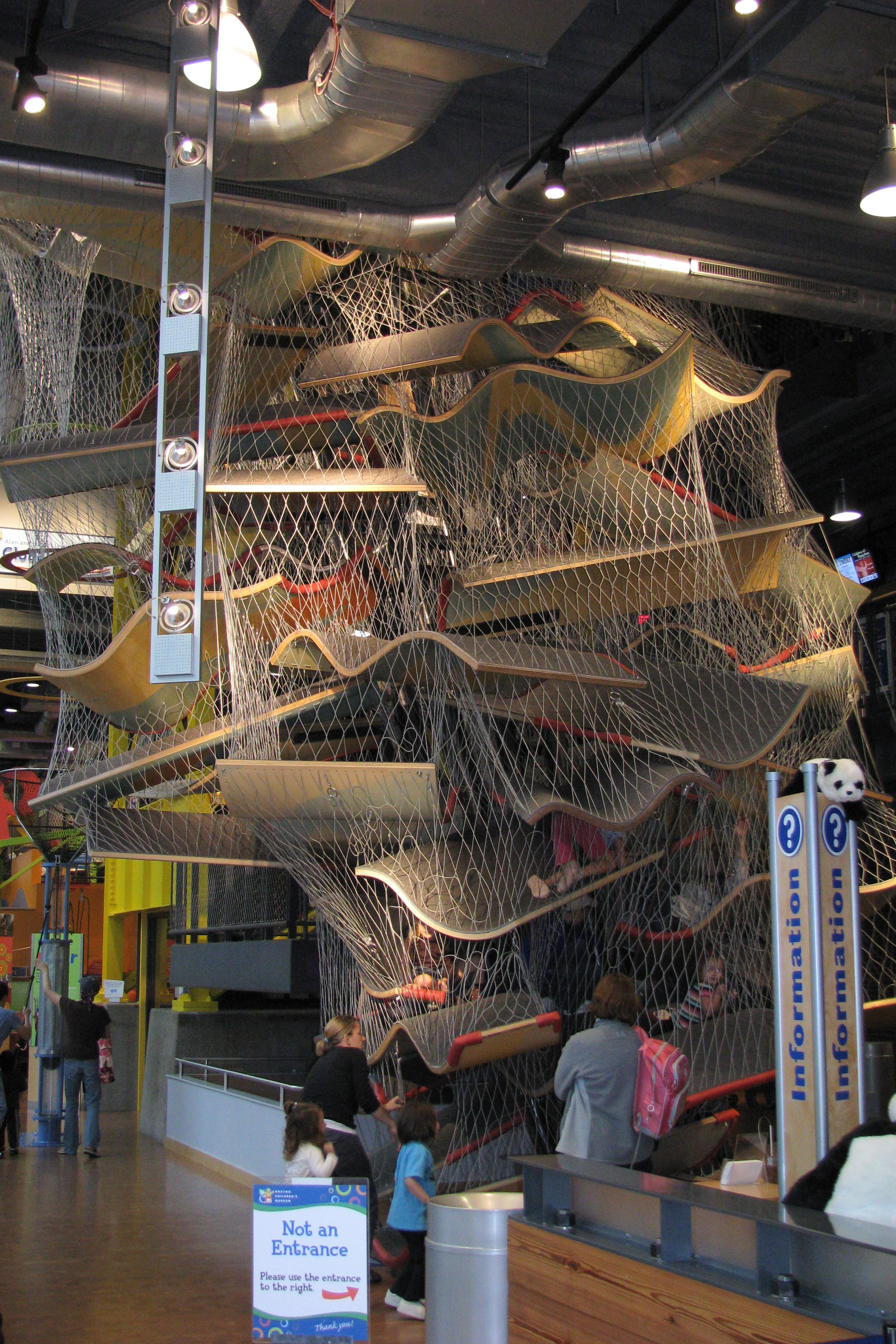
Boston Children's Museum

Thomas Walker Luckey (January 6, 1940 – August 19, 2012) was an American architect and sculptor, best known for inventing abstract playgrounds called Luckey Climbers. Luckey also created furniture, merry-go-rounds, and interiors.

== Life and career ==
After graduating from the Yale School of Architecture in the late 1960s, Luckey began remodeling friends' houses and doing experimental projects, including one described as transforming:

... part of a Vermont house into a "spooky space landscape," as one critic described it. Randomly placed steps, ramps, and terraces ascended to the ceiling, and surfaces were sheathed in woolly orange carpet. Elsewhere in the house, a cylindrical rotating room replicated the spatial transmutations of LSD with a bed that became the back of a sofa, a table that morphed into a seating platform that became a desk, and so on.

— Alastair Gordon, Spaced Out: Radical Environments of the Psychedelic Sixties

In addition to interiors and furniture, he also designed merry-go-rounds; one, inspired by square dances, moves riders from one seat to another as they go around.

A mutual friend introduced Luckey to Agnes Gund, who insisted he contact the Boston Children's Museum. After he persuaded officials to let him build his first Luckey Climber, the structure turned out to be one of the museum's most popular exhibits, and has now been replaced with a new version.

In 2005, Luckey fell out of a second-story bathroom window and landed on his head. He fractured his cervical vertebra and was paralyzed from the neck down.

Luckey died on August 19, 2012, at Yale–New Haven Hospital due to complications from pneumonia. He was 72.

=== Luckey Climbers ===
Luckey Climbers are multi-story climbing structures crossed with mazes and jungle gyms. In appearance, they have been compared to "a Calder mobile fashioned from Monet's lily pads". They have been installed in locations across North America that include:

Venue	Location
Boston Children's Museum	Boston, Massachusetts
Children's Museum of Pittsburgh	Pittsburgh, Pennsylvania
Young at Art Museum	Davie, Florida
Papalote museo del niño (Papalote Children's Museum)	Mexico City, Mexico
Children's Discovery Museum	Normal, Illinois
Children's Museum of Winston-Salem	Winston-Salem, North Carolina
Westfield Fox Valley	Aurora, Illinois
Lincoln Park Zoo	Chicago, Illinois
WonderLab	Bloomington, Indiana
Long Island Children's Museum	Garden City, New York
Children's Museum at Holyoke	Holyoke, Massachusetts
Children's Museum of Memphis	Memphis, Tennessee
The Commons	Columbus, Indiana
Children's Museum of Alamance County	Graham, North Carolina
Westfield Century City	Los Angeles, California
Terry Lee Wells Nevada Discovery Museum	Reno, Nevada
Children's Museum of South Dakota	Brookings, South Dakota
Providence Children's Museum	Providence, Rhode Island
Delaware Children's Museum	Wilmington, Delaware
Children's Museum of the Upstate	Greenville, South Carolina
Children's Museum of Houston	Houston, Texas
The Magic House	Kirkwood, Missouri
Kidspace Children's Museum	Pasadena, California
Discovery Place	Charlotte, North Carolina
Christ Community Church	St. Charles, Illinois

== Luckey (documentary) ==
Filmmaker Laura Longsworth made a 2008 documentary, Luckey. The film appeared at a number of festivals, including SxSW and the Independent Film Festival of Boston, and garnered the Special Jury Award for Artistic Portrait at the Sidewalk Moving Picture Festival and Best Documentary Feature at the Indie Memphis Film Festival. The film has also been shown on the Sundance Channel.
