= Black Mothers Love & Resist =

Documentary Film

- Directed by: Débora Souza Silva
- Based on: Killings of Oscar Grant and Ulysses Wilkerson
- Produced by: Débora Souza Silva
- Release date: 2022
- Country: United States

Black Mothers Love & Resist is an American documentary film released in 2022.

== Description ==
The documentary film follows Wanda Johnson, mother of Oscar Grant III who was killed by police at Fruitvale BART Station in 2009, and Angela Williams, mother of Ulysses Wilkerson who was beaten by Troy police officers in 2017. The film shows the two mothers coming together and building a network among mothers from Oakland to the American South.

The film was directed and produced by Débora Souza Silva.

== Funding & Support ==
The film received funding and support from Sundance Institute Documentary Fund, International Documentary Association, Creative Capital Awards, Fork Films Documentary Grant, California Council for the Humanities, Catapult Film Fund, and Chicken And Egg Pictures.

== Awards ==
• Best Black Lens Film, Sidewalk Film Festival, 2022 • Best Documentary Feature, Denton Black Film Festival, 2023 • Breakthrough Award, Athena Film Festival, 2023

== Nomination ==
• Best of the Best Awards in the Documentary Category, 20th Annual Run&Shoot Filmworks Martha's Vineyard African-American Film Festival, 2022

== Festival Selections ==
2022

• 65th San Francisco International Film Festival

• 20th Annual Run&Shoot Filmworks Martha's Vineyard African-American Film Festival

• 24th Annual Sidewalk Film Festival

• St. John's International Women's Film Festival

• Twin Cities Film Fest

• 33rd New Orleans Film Festival

2023

• Cinematters: NY Social Justice Film Festival

• Denton Black Film Festival

• Winter Film Awards International Film Festival

• Pan African Film & Arts Festival

• Big Sky Documentary Film Festival

• Athena Film Festival

• Freep Film Festival

• 47th Atlanta Film Festival
