= Spencer Luckey =

American sculptor

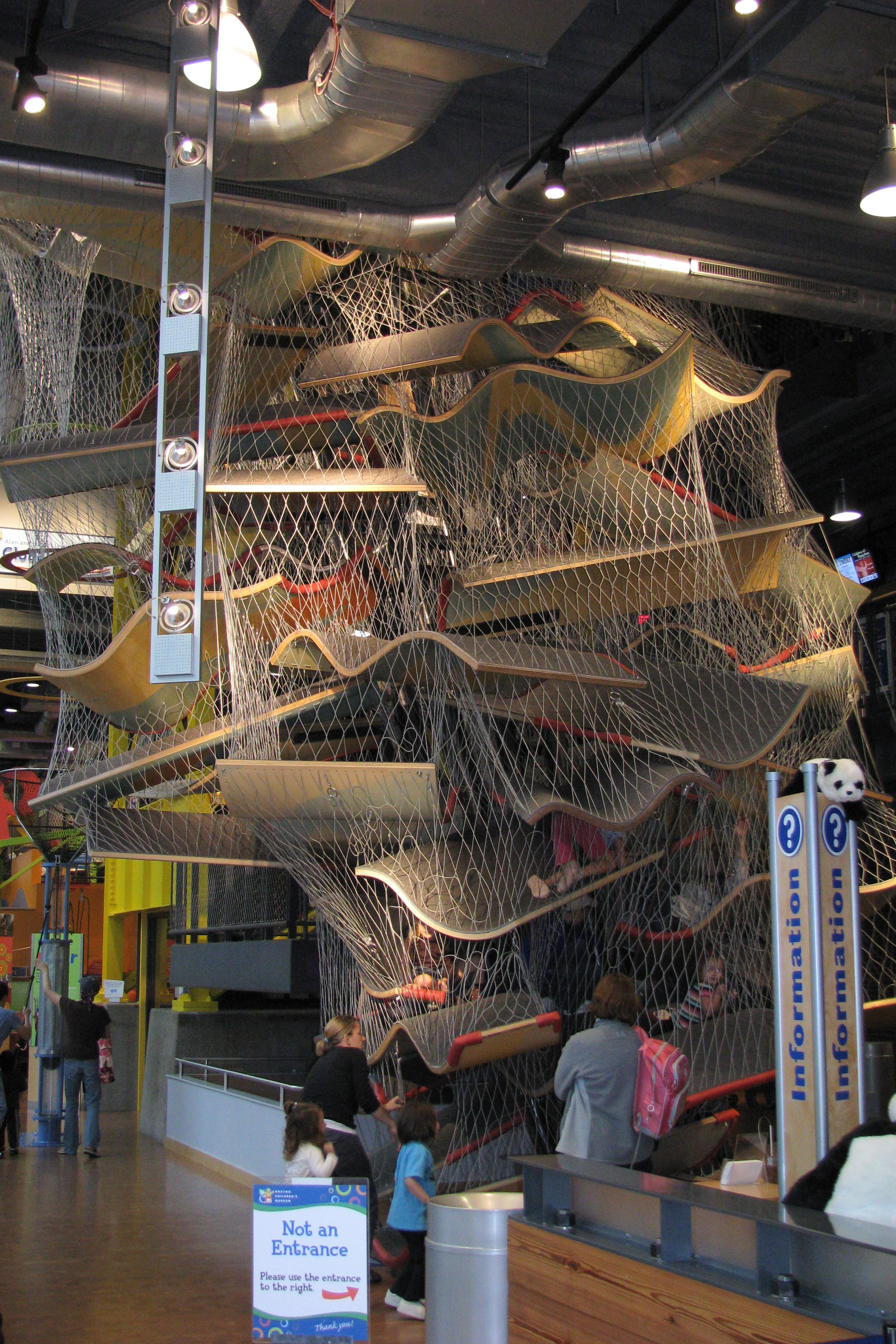
- Born: Spencer Walker Luckey; New Haven, CT
- Education: Yale School of Architecture
- Occupation: Sculptor
- Known for: Luckey Climbers
- Parent(s): Tom Luckey, Elizabeth Mason
- Website: www.luckeyclimbers.com

Spencer Walker Luckey is an American artist, "Kid Architect", and president of Luckey Climbers, a design/fabrication firm that specializes in climbing sculptures for children's museums and other institutions world-wide.

== Biography ==
Spencer was raised in Short Beach, Connecticut by artist Tom Luckey and Elizabeth Mason. He attended the Foote School, followed by Northfield Mount Hermon and is a graduate of Connecticut College and Yale School of Architecture. He is married to artist Briah Uhl, and they have a son, Clyde.

== Luckey Climbers ==
Spencer took over operations in 2006 after his father, Tom Luckey, became paralyzed. Spencer has been responsible for the design, fabrication and installation of the climbers. While the head of Luckey Climbers, Spencer has introduced digitally-based techniques of shaping and structural analysis, his work marks a departure from the analog mode of his father. Luckey Climbers has expanded internationally. Works installed under Spencer include:

Project	Location	Client	Date
Ala Moana Center	Honolulu, Hawaii	Brookfield Properties	2016
Aquarium at the Boardwalk	Branson, Missouri	Kuvera and Partners	2021
Boston Children's Museum	Boston, Massachusetts	Boston Children's Museum	2016
Children's Discovery Museum	Normal, Illinois	City of Normal, Illinois	2022
Children's Museum of La Crosse	La Crosse, Wisconsin	Children's Museum of La Crosse	2016
The Franklin Institute	Philadelphia, Pennsylvania	The Franklin Institute	2016
Irvine Spectrum Center	Irvine, California	The Irvine Company	2017
Liberty Science Center	Jersey City, New Jersey	Liberty Science Center	2018
Museum of Solutions	Mumbai, India	Museum of Solutions	2023
River Pointe Church	Midland, Texas	River Pointe Church	2017
Symphony of the Seas, Harmony of the Seas, Mariner of the Seas, Freedom of the Seas, Independence of the Seas	International	Royal Caribbean International	2016, 2017, 2018, 2021
Trapiche Museo Interactivo	Los Mochis, Mexico	Trapiche Museo Interactivo	2016
W5	Belfast, Northern Ireland	Odyssey Place	2016

== Luckey (2008) ==
Spencer and his family are featured in the documentary Luckey, which focuses on Luckey Climbers in the aftermath of the accident which left Tom Luckey paralyzed. The film was shown at SxSW and other festivals, as well as on the Sundance Channel.
