= Westridge Court =

Coordinates: 41°46′4″N 88°12′16″W

- Location: Naperville, Illinois, US
- Address: 204 IL-59, Naperville, IL 60540
- Opened: 1990; 36 years ago
- Num. of stores: 30+
- Num. of anchor tenants: 6
- Floors: 1 (2 in Hollywood Palms)
- Public transit: Pace

Westridge Court is a large shopping center in Naperville, Illinois, that opened in 1990. It features nearly 30 stores, including Buy Buy Baby, Petco, and Bed Bath and Beyond. Prior to the Linens N Things/Savers, Old Navy, and Marshalls, there was a Kmart located on property.

Arby's, Chili's, and Portillo's were built in 1991. Carson's Furniture Gallery, Homemakers and Circuit City opened in 1992. Taco Bell opened in 1993. The Kmart closed in October 1998 due to a relocation of the store to the former Venture building at 510 South Route 59 (which closed in 2000 due to failing sales and being part of 72 stores scheduled to close in November). in 2004, Michaels opened across the street from the shopping center on Aurora Avenue. in 2005, Homemakers closed its Naperville Location. in 2006, Cub Foods closed all of its Chicago area locations and in 2007, CompUSA closed its Naperville store. DSW moved to Springbrook Prairie Pavilion in 2008.

in 2009, Hollywood Palms Cinema opened while Circuit City and Linens N Things closed all locations after both companies filed for bankruptcy. In 2011, HHGregg opened in the former Circuit City location. That same year, Borders closed all stores and an Old Country Buffett on site closed. In 2012, Gordmans opened in the former Cub Foods Location. In April of that same year, Buy Buy Baby opened in the former CompUSA Location.

On January 16, 2013, Turk Furniture opened in the former DSW. Around this time Big Lots moved from Iroquois Center on the other side of Naperville. In 2014, 2nd & Charles opened in the former Borders location. In 2015, Carson's Furniture Gallery was converted into Art Van Furniture. Savers and Shoe Carnival closed around 2016. In 2017, Gordmans and HHGregg closed as part of bankruptcy. Spirit Halloween opened in the former HHGregg.Funtopia opened in Summer 2018. Turk Furniture closed, and Furniture Resource + Rugs opened.

Construction began on the former site of Shoe Carnival, to make way for World Market at the end of 2018. 2nd and Charles closed on January 6. 2019. Marshalls moved to High Grove Plaza in the former Golf Galaxy during the summer of 2019. In 2020, Bed Bath & Beyond moved from Fox Valley Commons into the former the 2nd & Charles location. That same year, it was announced Art Van Furniture would close all of its stores. Edge Fitness announced it would open in the former Gordmans. Old Navy moved to Springbrook Prairie Pavilion around October 2020.

In 2024, the shops composing the northeast corner were demolished in order to make way for a new section titled "Block 59" which will feature several upscale dining options.
