= Débora Souza Silva =

Afro-Brazilian filmmaker

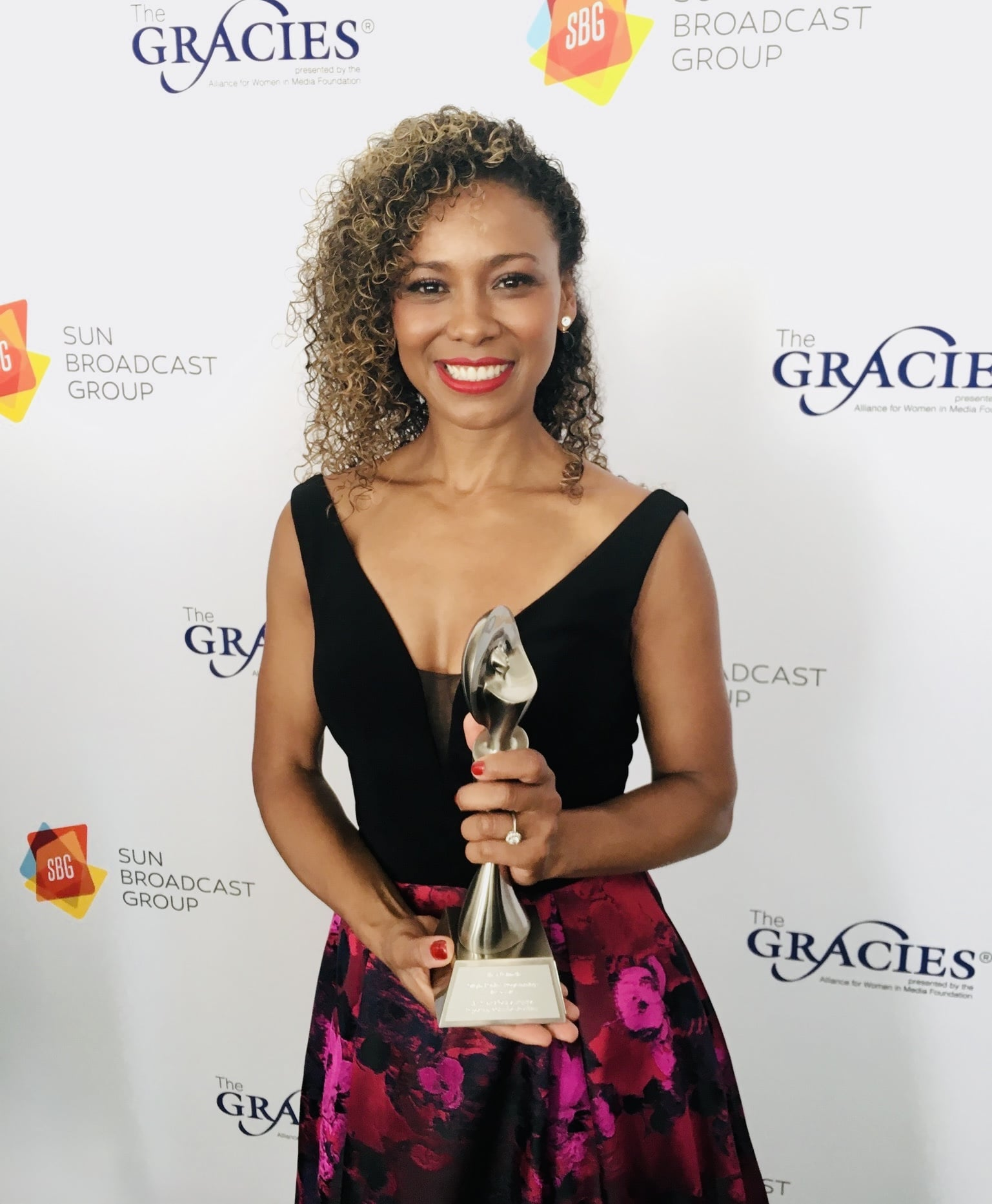
- Débora Souza Silva at The Gracie Awards ceremony.
- Citizenship: Brazilian
- Notable work: For Our Children, Fractured
- Website: debsilva.com

Débora Souza Silva is an Afro-Brazilian director, producer, writer, journalist, and filmmaker. She is best known for her feature documentary For Our Children (Netflix), and Fractured (Frontline |PBS). She received the Les Payne Founder's Award from the National Association of Black Journalists, the Creative Capital Award, and was selected for a New York Times Institute Fellowship.

== Career ==
Silva began her career as an on-air television reporter and producer in Brazil, covering stories about race and social inequality. In 2016, she was awarded a fellowship with The Center for Investigative Reporting, where she produced a series of short documentaries focused on immigration and social justice. Her work addresses social issues, exploring themes of identity, cultural memory, and the experiences of women of color, and has been featured by several news outlets, including PBS, BBC, The New York Times, TIME, Reveal News, KQED, and Fusion.

=== Filmmaker ===
Silva wrote, directed, and produced For Our Children, a documentary that chronicles the powerful convergence of two mothers, Reverend Wanda Johnson and Angela Williams, whose lives were forever altered by police brutality against young Black men. The film premiered at the 2022 San Francisco International Film Festival under its original title Black Mothers Love & Resist, was later acquired by Ava DuVernay's Array Releasing, and was released on Netflix on May 10, 2024, under the new title, For Our Children.

Directed, produced, and co-written by Silva, Fractured examines the mental health crisis in jails across the United States. The documentary is based on a radio and digital series released in 2023 by WFAE and FRONTLINE.

Silva has been awarded funding by the Sundance Institute, the Tribeca Film Institute, California Humanities, Firelight Media, and Chicken & Egg Pictures.

== Awards ==
Silva was named one of the winners of the 2021 Creative Capital Awards for her Black Mothers project.

In 2022, she received the Sidewalk Film Festival Award for Best Black Lens Film and was nominated for Best Documentary at the Martha's Vineyard African-American Film Festival.

In 2023, she was honored with the Athena Film Festival Breakthrough Award, nominated for Best Documentary Feature at the Winter Film Awards, and won the Best Documentary Film award at the Denton Black Film Festival for Black Mothers Love & Resist.

In 2024, her documentary For Our Children was a finalist for the inaugural Sing Sing Film Festival award, an initiative by The Marshall Project.

In 2025, her film Sol in the Garden was recognized as an Athena Rising Stars selection at the Athena Film Festival.

== Filmography ==
=== Featured documentary (debut) ===
Year	Title	Director	Producer	Writer	Network(s)	Ref.
2024	For Our Children (formerly Black Mothers Love & Resist)	Yes	Yes	Yes	Netflix	

=== Short films ===
Year	Title	Director	Producer	Writer	Network(s)	Ref.
2018	Luna	Yes	Yes	Yes	Glamour	
2019	Based on a True Story	Yes	Yes	Yes	PBS	
2023	Sol in the Garden	Yes	Yes	No	PBS | POV	
2024	Fractured	Yes	Yes	Yes	PBS | Frontline	
