= Christian Habicht =

Christian Habicht may refer to:

- Christian Habicht (actor) (1952–2010), German actor
- Christian Habicht (historian) (1926–2018), German historian of ancient Greece

== See also ==
- Habicht (surname)
- Habicht (disambiguation)
