= Habicht (surname) =

Habicht is a German surname. Notable people with the surname include:

- Theodor Habicht (1898–1944) leading political figure in Nazi Germany
- Christian Habicht (historian) (1926–2018)
- Christian Habicht (actor)
- Florian Habicht (born 1975) German born New Zealand film director
- Frank Habicht, German-born New Zealand photographer
- Werner Habicht (1930–2022) German scholar of Shakespeare

== See also ==
- Habicht (disambiguation)
