= Oscilloscope Laboratories =

American film and recording company

- Type: Privately held company
- Industry: Motion picture
- Founded: 2006
- Founder: Adam Yauch; David Fenkel
- Key people: Dan Berger
- Website: oscilloscope.net

Oscilloscope Laboratories is an independent film company, distributor, recording studio, and production facility. It was founded in 2006 by Adam Yauch and former TH!NKFilm executive David Fenkel, with Fenkel initially serving as president.

Two years later, in 2008, Dan Berger was named president of Oscilloscope.

In May 2012, Fenkel left the company to co-found A24.

== Releases ==
| Film | Year | Country | Director(s) | Notes | Spine Number |
|---|---|---|---|---|---|
| Shame and Money | 2027 | Albania | Visar Morina | | |
| Act One | 2027 | U.S. | Sophia Takal | | |
| Game | 2027 | U.K. | John Minton | | |
| The Travel Companion | 2026 | U.S. | Alex Mallis Travis Wood | | |
| Mistress Dispeller | 2025 | U.S.–China | Elizabeth Lo | | 154 |
| Universal Language | 2024 | Canada | Matthew Rankin | | 153 |
| God & Country | 2024 | U.S. | Dan Partland | | 151 |
| Wildcat | 2024 | U.S. | Ethan Hawke | | 152 |
| Sometimes I Think About Dying | 2024 | U.S. | Rachel Lambert | | 150 |
| Canary | 2023 | U.S. | Danny O'Malley Alex Rivest | | 144 |
| Piaffe | 2022 | Germany | Ann Oren | | 145 |
| Shortbus | 2022 | U.S. | John Cameron Mitchell | re-release (2006) | 128 |
| Claydream | 2021 | U.S. | Marq Evans | | 133 |
| Poser | 2021 | U.S. | Ori Segev, Noah Dixon | | 132 |
| The Tale of King Crab | 2021 | Italy | Alessio Rigo de Righi, Matteo Zoppis | | 130 |
| Anonymous Club | 2021 | Australia | Danny Cohen | | 136 |
| Clara Sola | 2021 | Costa Rica | Nathalie Álvarez Mesén | | 135 |
| Stanleyville | 2021 | Canada | Maxwell McCabe-Lokos | | 131 |
| So Late So Soon | 2021 | U.S. | Daniel Hymanson | | 123 |
| The Velvet Queen | 2021 | France | Marie Amiguet | | 129 |
| No Ordinary Man | 2021 | Canada | Aisling Chin-Yee, Chase Joynt | | 126 |
| Les Nôtres | 2021 | Canada | Jeanne Leblanc | | 125 |
| Silo | 2021 | U.S. | Marshall Burnette | | 124 |
| Sophie Jones | 2021 | U.S. | Jessie Barr | | 122 |
| Truth to Power | 2021 | U.S. | Garin Hovannisian | | 121 |
| What Happened Was... | 2021 | U.S. | Tom Noonan | re-release | 116 |
| Billy the Kid | 2020 | U.S. | Jennifer Venditti | re-release (2007) | |
| The Twentieth Century | 2020 | Canada | Matthew Rankin | | 115 |
| Martin Margiela: In His Own Words | 2020 | Belgium, Germany | Reiner Holzemer | | 120 |
| We Are Little Zombies | 2020 | Japan | Makoto Nagahisa | | 114 |
| All I Can Say | 2020 | U.S. | Danny Clinch, Taryn Gould, Colleen Hennessy, Shannon Hoon | | |
| Clementine | 2020 | U.S. | Lara Jean Gallagher | | 117 |
| The Infiltrators | 2020 | Canada | Cristina Ibarra, Alex Rivera | | 112 |
| Run This Town | 2020 | Canada | Ricky Tollman | | |
| Saint Frances | 2020 | U.S. | Alex Thompson | | |
| Cane River | 2020 | U.S. | Horace B. Jenkins | re-release (1982) | 111 |
| VHYES | 2020 | U.S. | Jack Henry Robbins | | |
| Midnight Traveler | 2019 | U.S. | Hassan Fazili | | |
| Ms. Purple | 2019 | U.S. | Justin Chon | | |
| Jay Myself | 2019 | U.S. | Stephen Wilkes | | |
| The Hours and Times | 2019 | U.S. | Christopher Munch | re-release (1991) | |
| Relaxer | 2019 | U.S. | Joel Potrykus | | |
| Combat Obscura | 2019 | U.S. | Miles Lagoze | | |
| Wrestle | 2019 | U.S. | Lauren Belfer, Suzannah Herbert | | |
| Hal | 2018 | U.S. | Amy Scott | | |
| John McEnroe: In the Realm of Perfection | 2018 | U.S. | Julien Faraut | | |
| Madeline's Madeline | 2018 | U.S. | Josephine Decker | | |
| Searching for Ingmar Bergman | 2018 | France, Germany | Felix Moeller, Margarethe von Trotta | | |
| The King | 2018 | U.S. | Eugene Jarecki | | |
| On Her Shoulders | 2018 | U.S. | Alexandria Bombach | | |
| Summer 1993 | 2018 | Spain, U.S. | Carla Simón | | |
| Sollers Point | 2018 | U.S. | Matthew Porterfield | | |
| November | 2018 | Estonia, Poland, Netherlands | Rainer Sarnet | | |
| Song of Granite | 2017 | U.S. | Pat Collins | | |
| Beauty and the Dogs | 2017 | France, U.S. | Kaouther Ben Hania | | |
| May It Last: A Portrait of The Avett Brothers | 2017 | U.S. | Judd Apatow, Michael Bonfiglio | | |
| Bobbi Jene | 2017 | U.S. | Elvira Lind | | |
| Brimstone & Glory | 2017 | U.S. | Viktor Jakloveski | | |
| The Road Movie | 2017 | Belarus, U.S. | Dmitrii Kalashnikov | | |
| Polina | 2017 | France | Valérie Müller and Angelin Preljocaj | | |
| Santoalla | 2017 | Spain, U.S. | Andrew Becker, Daniel Mehrer | | |
| Kedi | 2017 | U.S. | Ceyda Torun | | |
| Always Shine | 2017 | U.S. | Sophia Takal | | 78 |
| Contemporary Color | 2017 | U.S. | Bill Ross IV, Turner Ross | | 80 |
| The Love Witch | 2016 | U.S. | Anna Biller | | |
| Girl Asleep | 2016 | U.S. | Rosemary Myers | | |
| Lost in Paris | 2016 | U.S. | Dominique Abel, Fiona Gordon | | |
| The Alchemist Cookbook | 2016 | U.S. | Joel Potrykus | | |
| Notes on Blindness | 2016 | U.K. | Peter Middleton, James Spinney | Short film | |
| One Week and a Day | 2016 | Israel | Asaph Polonsky | | |
| Pickle (short film) | 2016 | U.S. | Amy Nicholson | | |
| The Fits | 2016 | U.S. | Anna Rose Holmer | | |
| Ma Ma | 2016 | Spain, France | Julio Medem | | |
| The Wait | 2016 | Italy, France | Piero Messina | | |
| Embrace of the Serpent | 2015 | Colombia, Venezuela, Argentina | Ciro Guerra | | |
| What Our Fathers Did: A Nazi Legacy | 2015 | U.K. | David Evans | | |
| Above and Below | 2015 | Switzerland, Germany | Nicholas Steiner | | |
| Body | 2015 | U.S. | Dan Berk, Robert Olsen | | |
| The Second Mother | 2015 | Brazil | Anna Muylaert | | |
| Félix & Meira | 2015 | Canada | Maxime Giroux | | |
| El Elefante Desaparecido (The Vanished Elephant) | 2015 | Peru, Colombia, Spain | Javier Fuentes-León | | |
| The Past is a Grotesque Animal | 2015 | U.S. | Jason Miller | | |
| The Wonders | 2015 | Italy, Switzerland, Germany | Alice Rohrwacher | | 85 |
| Catch Me Daddy | 2015 | U.K. | Daniel Wolfe | | 83 |
| Mad as Hell | 2015 | U.S. | Andrew Napier | | 88 |
| The Kill Team | 2014 | U.S. | Dan Krauss | | 78 |
| Art and Craft | 2014 | U.S. | Sam Cullman, Jennifer Grausman; co-directed by Mark Becker | | 79 |
| Gabriel | 2014 | U.S. | Lou Howe | | |
| Low Down | 2014 | U.S. | Jeff Preiss | | 80 |
| Soul of a Banquet | 2014 | U.S. | Wayne Wang | | 81 |
| Buzzard | 2014 | U.S. | Joel Potrykus | | 82 |
| Animals | 2014 | U.S. | Collin Schiffi | | 87 |
| Pulp: A Film About Life, Death & Supermarkets | 2014 | U.K. | Florian Habicht | | 86 |
| Big Significant Things | 2014 | U.S. | Bryan Reisberg | | 84 |
| Whitewash | 2014 | Canada | Emanuel Hoss-Desmarais | | 71 |
| 12 O'Clock Boys | 2014 | U.S. | Lotfy Nathan | | 56 |
| Teenage | 2014 | Germany | Matt Wolf | | 57 |
| Stand Clear of the Closing Doors | 2013 | U.S. | Sam Fleischner | | 72 |
| Coherence | 2013 | U.K. | James Ward Byrkit | | 77 |
| About Sunny | 2013 | U.S. | Bryan Wizemann | | 62 |
| Dying to do Letterman | 2013 | U.S. | Joke Fincioen, Biagio Messina | | 63 |
| Welcome to Pine Hill | 2013 | U.S. | Keith Miller | | 64 |
| Wasteland | 2013 | U.K. | Rowan Athale | | 65 |
| A Teacher | 2013 | U.S. | Hannah Fidell | | 67 |
| Breakup at a Wedding | 2013 | U.S. | Victor Quinaz | | 68 |
| Off Label | 2013 | U.S. | Michael Palmieri, Donal Mosher | | 69 |
| Our Day Will Come | 2013 | France | Romain Gavras | | 70 |
| Tim and Susan Have Matching Handguns | 2013 | U.S. | Joe Callander | Short film | 73 |
| It's a Disaster | 2013 | U.S. | Todd Berger | | 52 |
| These Birds Walk | 2013 | Pakistan, U.S. | Omar Mullick, Bassam Tariq | | 53 |
| Mother of George | 2013 | Nigeria | Andrew Dosunmu | | 54 |
| After Tiller | 2013 | U.S. | Martha Shane, Lana Wilson | | 55 |
| The Brooklyn Brothers Beat the Best | 2013 | U.S. | Ryan O'Nan | | 47 |
| Jingle Bell Rocks! | 2013 | Canada | Mitchell Kezin | | 58 |
| Bunohan: Return to Murder | 2013 | Malaysia | Dain Said | | 60 |
| Metro Manila | 2013 | U.K. | Sean Ellis | | |
| The Rise | 2012 | U.S. | Rowan Athale | | |
| We Need to Talk About Kevin | 2012 | U.K. | Lynne Ramsay | | 43 |
| Happy Few | 2012 | France | Antony Cordier | Released as Four Lovers | |
| Shut Up and Play the Hits | 2012 | U.S. | Will Lovelace, Dylan Southern | | 45 |
| Hello I Must Be Going | 2012 | U.S. | Todd Louiso | | 46 |
| The Apple Pushers | 2012 | U.S. | Mary Mazzio | | 75 |
| Only the Young | 2012 | U.S. | Jason Tippet, Elizabeth Mims | | 48 |
| Tchoupitoulas | 2012 | U.S. | Bill Ross IV, Turner Ross | | 49 |
| Reality | 2012 | Italy | Matteo Garrone | | 50 |
| Wuthering Heights | 2012 | U.K. | Andrea Arnold | | 51 |
| We Can't Go Home Again | 2012 | U.S. | Nicholas Ray | | 39 |
| Samsara | 2012 | U.S. | Ron Fricke | | 59 |
| Oma & Bella | 2012 | Germany | Alexa Karolinski | | 61 |
| 28 Hotel Rooms | 2012 | U.S. | Matt Ross | | 35 |
| Dark Days | 2011 | U.S. | Marc Singer | re-release (2000) | 36 |
| Don't Expect Too Much | 2011 | U.S. | Susan Ray | | 92 |
| Compassion in Emptiness | 2011 | U.S. | Dalai Lama | | 37 |
| If a Tree Falls: A Story of the Earth Liberation Front | 2011 | U.S. | Marshall Curry | | 38 |
| Bellflower | 2011 | U.S. | Evan Glodell | | 40 |
| Rebirth | 2011 | U.S. | Jim Whitaker | | 41 |
| The Other F Word | 2011 | U.S. | Andrea Blaugrund Nevins | | 42 |
| Monogamy | 2011 | U.S. | Dana Adam Shapiro | | 29 |
| The Unloved | 2011 | U.K. | Samantha Morton | | 30 |
| Meek's Cutoff | 2011 | U.S. | Kelly Reichardt | | 31 |
| Who Took The Bomp? Le Tigre On Tour | 2011 | U.S. | Kerthy Fix | | 33 |
| Bananas!* | 2011 | Sweden | Fredrik Gertten | | 24 |
| Youssou N'Dour: I Bring What I Love | 2010 | U.S. | Elizabeth Chai Vasarhelyi | | 20 |
| The Maid (La Nana) | 2010 | Chile | Sebastián Silva | | 21 |
| Tell Them Anything You Want: A Portrait of Maurice Sendak | 2010 | U.S. | Lance Bangs, Spike Jonze | Companion to Where the Wild Things Are | 22 |
| The Exploding Girl | 2010 | U.S. | Bradley Rust Gray | | 23 |
| A Film Unfinished | 2010 | Israel | Yael Hersonski | | 25 |
| Howl | 2010 | U.S. | Rob Epstein, Jeffrey Friedman | | 26 |
| William S. Burroughs: A Man Within | 2010 | U.S. | Yony Leyser | | 27 |
| I Knew It Was You: Rediscovering John Cazale | 2010 | U.S. | Richard Shepard | | 28 |
| Exit Through the Gift Shop | 2010 | U.S. | Banksy | Home release only | 32 |
| Kisses | 2010 | Ireland | Lance Daly | | 9 |
| Rare Exports: A Christmas Tale | 2010 | Finland | Jalmari Helander | | 34 |
| The Paranoids | 2010 | Argentina | Gabriel Medina | | 14 |
| The Thorn in the Heart (L’Epine dans le Coeur) | 2010 | France | Michel Gondry | | 16 |
| Polytechnique | 2009 | Canada | Denis Villeneuve | | 91 |
| Terribly Happy (Frygtelig lykkelig) | 2009 | Denmark | Henrik Ruben Genz | | 17 |
| Treeless Mountain | 2009 | Korea | So Yong Kim | | 7 |
| Scott Walker: 30 Century Man | 2009 | U.S. | Stephen Kijak | | 8 |
| The Garden | 2009 | U.S. | Scott Hamilton Kennedy | | 10 |
| The Law (La Loi) | 2009 | U.S. | Jules Dassin | re-release (1959) | 11 |
| Burma VJ | 2009 | Denmark | Anders Østergaard | | 12 |
| Unmistaken Child | 2009 | Israel | Nati Baratz | | 13 |
| No Impact Man | 2009 | U.S. | Laura Gabbert and Justin Schein | | 15 |
| The Messenger | 2009 | U.S. | Oren Moverman | | 18 |
| Beautiful Losers | 2009 | U.S. | Aaron Rose | | 19 |
| Wild Combination: A Portrait of Arthur Russell | 2008 | U.S. | Matt Wolf | | 74 |
| Gunnin' for That No. 1 Spot | 2008 | U.S. | Adam Yauch | | 1 |
| FLOW: For Love of Water | 2008 | France | Irena Salina | | 2 |
| Dear Zachary: A Letter to a Son About His Father | 2008 | U.S. | Kurt Kuenne | | 3 |
| Wendy and Lucy | 2008 | U.S. | Kelly Reichardt | | 4 |
| Frontrunners | 2008 | U.S. | Caroline Suh | | 5 |
| Not Your Typical Bigfoot Movie | 2008 | U.S. | Jay Delaney | | 6 |
