= Royal Commission on Genetic Modification =

Royal Comission in New Zealand

The Royal Commission on Genetic Modification was established by the New Zealand Government to look into and report on the issues surrounding genetic modification in New Zealand. The overall conclusion recommended a 'proceed, with caution' approach to the industry, which was subsequently reflected in the Hazardous Substances and New Organisms Act (HSNO Act),1996.

The commission was chaired by Thomas Eichelbaum and it produced the Report of the Royal Commission on Genetic Modification in 2001.

== See also ==
- Genetic engineering in New Zealand
