= Love Story (2011 New Zealand film) =

- Directed by: Florian Habicht
- Written by: Florian Habicht; Peter O'Donoghue
- Produced by: Pictures for Anna
- Starring: Masha Yakovenko; Florian Habicht; Frank Habicht
- Cinematography: Maria Ines Manchego
- Release date: 14 July 2011 (New Zealand International Film Festival)
- Running time: 91 minutes
- Country: New Zealand
- Language: English

Love Story is a 2011 New Zealand film directed by and starring Florian Habicht. Set in New York City, the film combines real-life scenes where members of the public dictate the love story with those of Florian (as himself) and Masha Yakovenko as they act it out.

The film's world premiere was held at the opening night of the New Zealand International Film Festival 2011. Love Story has screened in numerous international film festivals, and won the Audience Choice Award at the Pluk de Nacht Outdoor film festival in Amsterdam 2013. Jarvis Cocker of Pulp saw the film during the London International Film Festival, and invited Habicht to make a film about his group.
