= Steve Abel =

New Zealand political candidate and singer-songwriter

Steve Abel MP
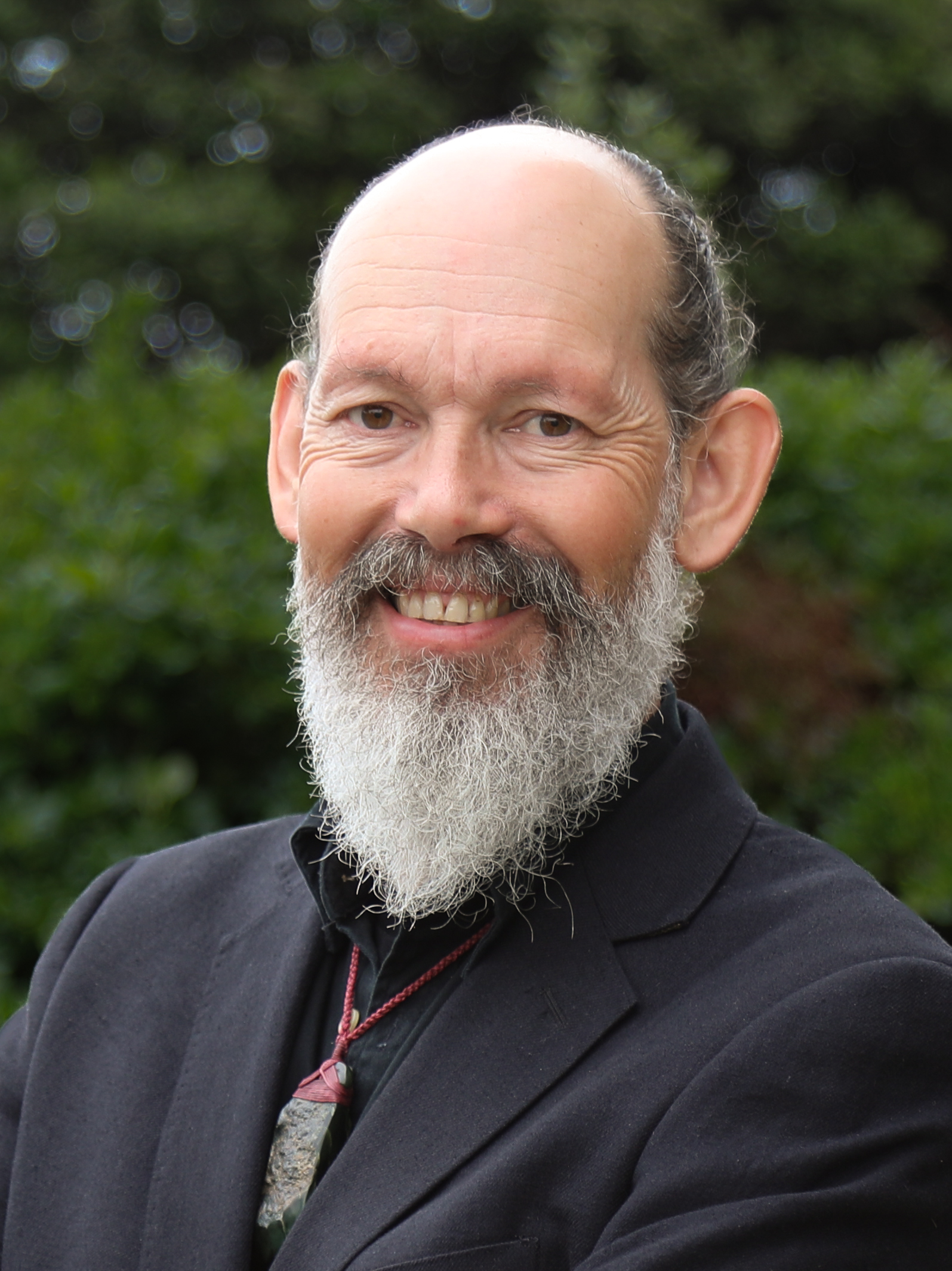
- Abel in 2026

Member of the New Zealand Parliament for Green party list
- Incumbent
- Assumed office 14 October 2023

Personal details
- Born: Stephen George Bremner Abel
- Party: Green

Stephen George Bremner Abel is a New Zealand politician, environmental activist and musician who is involved with Greenpeace. Since 2023 he has served as a list member of parliament for the Green Party of Aotearoa New Zealand.

== Activism ==
Abel was involved from 1998 to 2000 in the successful campaign by Native Forest Action to stop native logging on the West Coast of New Zealand's South Island. He later worked as a campaigner for Greenpeace from 2002 to 2006 during which time he was prominent in the New Zealand movement against genetically engineered food crops. He was also involved in actions against the proposed coal-fired power station Marsden B in Northland, New Zealand including a nine-day occupation in 2005 and the operation of a pirate radio station Heatwave FM which broadcast from Ruakaka in November 2006. The Marsden B proposal was later abandoned. Abel was one of the coordinators of the re-recording of the Don McGlashan song "Anchor Me" in 2005 to mark the twentieth anniversary of the bombing of the Rainbow Warrior.

Returning to Greenpeace in 2010, he helped coordinate the historic March Against Mining which took place in Queen Street Auckland on 1 May 2010. The march, later contributing to a government back-down on proposed mining of high-value conservation estate, was reported as the "biggest protest in a generation". He campaigned in 2011 with Te Whānau-a-Apanui against the Brazilian oil company Petrobras' plans for deep sea oil drilling in the Raukumara Basin which included a flotilla that spent 42 days at sea. Petrobras relinquished their drill permits in December 2012. Abel has publicly advocated for peaceful civil disobedience as a means to resisting the oil industry and achieving political action to address climate change.

On 21 July 2020 Abel was arrested when protesting the removal of a stand of native trees on a Canal Road property in Avondale, Auckland, in what would become New Zealand’s longest-running live-in tree protest, lasting 245 days and out of which arose urban tree protection group Mana Rakau.

In 2021 and 2022, as Senior Campaigner for Greenpeace, Abel led a free mail-in and town-hall water testing service focussed on rural communities impacted by nitrate water contamination in dairy intense regions. Abel has described access to safe drinking water as a “a basic human right that is currently not being met for people living outside of cities.”

== Political career ==
New Zealand Parliament
Years	Term	Electorate	List	Party
2023–2026	54th	List	9	Green
2026–present	54th	List	12	Green

At the 1999 general election he stood as a list candidate as well as in the Titirangi electorate as a Green Party candidate, but was not elected. At the next election in 2002 he was again unsuccessful as a list candidate and in the seat of Mangere. In February 2020, Steve Abel announced that he would be contesting the New Lynn electorate as a Green Party candidate during the 2020 general election. During the 2020 election that was held on 17 October, Abel came third place with a final result of 3,701 votes. On preliminary results, Abel was ranked one place too low to enter Parliament on the Green party list, but took part in the induction for new MPs in case he was elected after the counting of special votes. The Greens' share of the party vote increased when the final results were released, but not enough to bring Abel into Parliament.

=== First term, 2023–2026 ===
He contested New Lynn again at the 2023 New Zealand general election. While he failed to capture New Lynn, Abel was elected to Parliament on the party list.

In late November 2023, Abel assumed the Green Party's agriculture, animal welfare, food safety, Māori-Crown relations: Te Arawhiti, Just Transitions, resources and racing spokesperson portfolios. In May 2025, he introduced a member's bill to apply New Zealand animal welfare standards to imported agricultural products, including prohibitions on the use of battery cages and gestation crates.

During the Gaza war, Abel attended a Palestinian solidarity rally where he joined fellow Green MPs Chlöe Swarbrick, Ricardo Menéndez March and Darleen Tana in chanting "From the river to the sea, Palestine will be free."

=== Second term, 2026– present ===
During the 2026 New Zealand general election, Abel was ranked 12th on the Green Party list. He contested the Waitākere electorate.

Based on preliminary results, Abel came third place in the Waitākere contest, winning 4,625 votes. However, he was able to return to Parliament on the Green Party list.

== Musical career ==
Abel contributed his song Hospice for Destitute Lovers, and voice, as the character of Gert, to Florian Habicht's art-noir feature film Woodenhead (2003). His debut album Little Death, recorded by Nick Abbott at Montage Studios in Grey Lynn, garnered favourable reviews when released in February 2006. It featured a "Kiwi supergroup" of notable New Zealand musicians including Geoff Maddock of Goldenhorse and Bressa Creeting Cake; Mike Hall and Milan Borich of Pluto; and Gareth Thomas of Goodshirt; and guest vocals by Kirsten Morell, also of Goldenhorse. Little Death was awarded the Alternatui for 2006 Album of the Year.

Abel's second album Flax Happy, featured the same band as his debut under the name The Chrysalids (after the 1955 novel by John Wyndham). It was recorded mainly at Roundhead Studios by Dale Cotton in July 2007. Two songs featuring Texan chanteuse Jolie Holland were recorded by Lee Prebble at The Surgery in Wellington. Flax Happy was released in 2008 (NZ) and 2009 (UK) to critical acclaim in both territories. Journalist Graham Reid described Abel as, "A refined writer whose lyrics have a bone-bare quality – the sound of someone writing and singing from a place where there is no guile, just hard truth and clear eyes."

Having moved to live in Geneva in 2008, and encouraged by fellow musician Delaney Davidson, Abel entered and won The Saddest Song in the World Competition in Berlin in May 2009. He played at the CMJ music festival in New York later that year, and in November began recording his third album Luck/Hope with Jolie Holland, Shahzad Ismaily and Grey Gersten at Manhattan's Rivington 66 Studio.

== Discography ==
=== Studio albums ===
- 2006: Little Death by Steve Abel
- 2008: Flax Happy by Steve Abel & The Chrysalids
- 2016: Luck/Hope by Steve Abel
