= Genetically modified food in Oceania =

Since the 1980s New Zealand and Australia have used genetic engineering for different purposes, including the production of food. Each country has faced controversy in this area and used a variety of legal measures to allay concerns and move toward the safe implementation of the technology. As of 2024 many issues requiring ongoing review remain in Oceania, in line with European data that showed "questions of consumer confidence and trust" and negative perceptions of genetically modified food as unhealthy and the technology as a process likely to damage the environment. Australian and New Zealand both require labeling so consumers can exercise choice between foods that have genetically modified, conventional, or organic origins.

== Australia ==
Genetic engineering in Australia was originally (since 1987) overseen by the Genetic Manipulation Advisory Committee, before the Office of the Gene Technology Regulator (OGTR) and Food Standards Australia New Zealand took over in 2001. The OTGR is a Commonwealth Government Authority within the Department of Health and Ageing and reports directly to Parliament through a Ministerial Council on Gene Technology and has legislative powers. It was established as part of the Gene Technology Act 2003 and operates according to the Gene Technology Regulations 2001. The OGTR reports directly to Parliament through a Ministerial Council on Gene Technology and has legislative powers. The OGTR decides on license applications for the release of all genetically modified organisms, while regulation is provided by the Therapeutic Goods Administration for GM medicines or Food Standards Australia New Zealand for GM food. The individual state governments are then able to assess the impact of release on markets and trade and apply further legislation to control approved genetically modified products.

Genetically modified cotton, canola, and carnations are grown in Australia. Genetically modified cotton has been grown commercially in New South Wales and Queensland since 1996. GM canola was approved in 2003 and was first grown in 2008 and was first approved in Western Australia in 2010.

In 2011 genetically modified plants were grown in all states except South Australia and Tasmania, who have extended their moratoriums until 2019 and 2014. The Queensland and Northern Territory Governments have not implemented any further legislation beyond the national level, but several other states placed bans on planting certain GM crops. In 2007 the New South Wales government extended a blanket moratorium on GM food crops until 2011, but allowed groups to apply for exemptions. New South Wales approved GM Canola for commercial cultivation in 2008, while the Victorian government let the moratorium on GM Canola expire in 2007. Western Australia passed the Genetically Modified Crops Free Areas Act in 2003 and was declared a GM free area in 2004. In 2008 an exception was made for the commercial cultivation of GM cotton in the Ord River Irrigation Areas. Trials of GM canola were carried out in 2003 and in 2010 the Western Australian government allowed the commercialisation of GM canola.

== New Zealand ==
=== Early management ===
By the early 1980s technologies involving recombinant bacteria were being applied in laboratories in New Zealand mostly for biological and medical research. There had already been a move at a governmental level to manage genetic modification in the country and in 1978 the government placed a moratorium on field releases and established the Advisory Committee on Novel Genetic Techniques (ACNGT). The setting up of this body reflected concerns at the time of some scientists and the community of New Zealand "about the possible ecological and public health consequences of release of a GMO into the environment...[being concerned with]...laboratory experiments involving novel genetic techniques and [giving] advice to researchers on contained laboratory and glasshouse experiments." Research in this field advanced rapidly and by 1986 when there was more demand for field trials, the New Zealand government setup the Field Release Working Party (FRWP) to monitor the regulation of field testing and release of GMOs. In 1987, the FRWP recommended the establishment of a committee to assess all proposals to field test or release GMOs and the Minister for the Environment established the GMO Interim Assessment Group (IAG) under Section 33 of the Environment Act 1986 and at this point, the moratorium on field release was lifted. Researchers, funded either by the private sector or the Government, were required to submit proposals to the IAG for assessment and after meeting the required guidelines, these were publicly posted in several New Zealand newspapers and the public had thirty days to make submissions.

=== Hazardous Substances and New Organisms Act (1996) ===
Neither the IAG or ACNGT had any legislative authority and as the public became more aware of field testing of genetically modified organisms, there was a call for legislation to monitor the process. The Environmental Minister at the time, Simon Upton who was also Minister for Crown Research Institutes, sponsored what was to become the Hazardous Substances and New Organisms Act (HSNO Act) which was passed on 16 April 1996. Upton saw the debate about genetically modified crops as significant as the controversy when New Zealand became nuclear-free in the 1980s. The Act defined genetically modified organism as "any organism in which any of the genes or other genetic material have been modified by in vitro techniques; or are inherited or otherwise derived, through any number of replications, from any genes or other genetic material which has been modified by in vitro techniques". It also noted that regulations could be made "(a) specifying the procedures and methods for assessing the probability that an adverse effect will occur from genetic modification of an organism: (b) specifying the probability that adverse effects will occur from specified development procedures:(c) specifying the circumstances in which genetic modification of an organism is a low risk genetic modification". Other sections covered assessments of projects for low risk genetic modification, and for the importation of genetically modified organisms with "any person importing any organism to declare, by statutory declaration, that the organism is not a genetically modified organism". Under the HSNO Act the Environmental Risk Management (ERMA) was also established as the body responsible for the management of the development or importation of genetically modified organisms (GMOs) into New Zealand.

=== Growing public concerns ===
By the late 1990s, the potential risks of GE technology emerged as an issue of public concern in New Zealand "fuelled by ethical concerns and health risks from inserting human genes into cattle, international concerns about the health effects of GM foods, and the potential environmental impacts of GM crops and other field uses." Greenpeace called for a moratorium on the release of GE organisms into the environment in 1996 and in 1997 established a consumer network that urged supermarkets not to sell GE foods. The government responded by setting up the Independent Biotechnology Advisory Group (IBAC) to focus on the human biotechnology and "provide independent advice to Government on its environmental, economic, ethical, social and health implications".

=== Royal Commission into Genetic Modification (2000) ===
The New Zealand Government was made fully aware of the concerns about genetic modification when in October 1999, a petition, signed by 92,000 New Zealanders, was presented to Parliament by the Green Party. Accordingly, on 21 December 1999, the government announced in its Speech from the Throne Opening of Parliament:

It is recognised that one area of research and development has led to significant public concerns. That is the area of genetic modification. A Royal Commission into Genetic Modification will be established. Until it has reported, a moratorium will be imposed on the commercial planting of genetically modified crops. Very strict conditions will apply to the consideration of any application for field trials until such time as the Commission reports on the wider issues.

Australian science broadcaster and writer Pete Pockley claimed that while the New Zealand Prime Minister at the time Helen Clark was justified in saying the "scope and processes [of the Commission] had been unique", some of the Commission's recommendations would require further resourcing, [to] "consolidate the commission’s good work [and] the New Zealand government will need to legislate with determination". Pockley further commented on some of the key recommendations of the Commission concluding that while the government was not bound by these, Helen Clarke and the environmental minister Marian Hobbs welcomed the commission and set a deadline for when plans would be in place to enact recommendations. A conclusion of the Commission was that while New Zealand should not rule out genetic modification, it recommended proceeding very cautiously.

=== Response to the Commission's Report ===
==== Government ====
The report of the Royal Commission into Genetic Modification made forty nine recommendations to the New Zealand Government. Marian Hobbs, the Minister for the Environment, noted that she was delighted the commission had [inquired] "into and report on the strategic options available to enable New Zealand to address genetic modification now and in the future...[and]...the concerns of New Zealanders [were] heard and evaluated". The same press release contained an overview and summary of the Commission's report including details of the recommendations and a timeline for the government to respond. The main conclusion of the Commission's report was that New Zealand should keep its options open with regard to genetic engineering and proceed carefully in order to minimise and manage any risks. [adopting] "a strategy of preserving opportunities and proceeding to use genetic modification selectively and with appropriate care...[rejecting]...the idea of a New Zealand free of all genetically modified material at one extreme and the option of unrestricted use of genetic modification at the other". In this formal acknowledgement of the Commission's Report in October 2001, the New Zealand Government committed to responding to the recommendations within three months. It noted the Commission's expectation that the food industry "must be subject to rigorous standards, properly enforced and carefully managed", with better publicity about the rules and a suggested introduction of a voluntary labelling scheme to allow identification of foods that are "free of genetically modified content or processes". The government confirmed on 31 October 2001 that it would legislate to stop genetically modified organisms being released into the country for the next two years, but it would lift a 16-month ban on field trials of the organisms which Helen Clark said "would go hand-in-hand with new rules to ensure materials used in the research were later destroyed or locked away". The Prime Minister stated in the same press release that there was not unanimous support for the policy from all members of her centre-left Labour Party, including some Māori MPs who "objected to genetic modification for religious and cultural reasons".

Early in 2002, following public consultation, the New Zealand government drafted a series of proposals for legislative changes, notably some to amend the Hazardous Substances and New Organisms act. These were not only to provide practical frameworks for managing new organisms but were an important part of the government's response to the Commission's report. Key elements included addressing changes in line with increased scientific knowledge, streamlining the process for contained research and for approval of new organisms that are medicines, ensuring effective compliance and enforcement and "extending the Minister’s ability to call in specific applications to include significant cultural, ethical and spiritual effects". These changes were presented as the New Organisms and Others Matters Bill. In the first reading of the Bill, Marian Hobbs concluded: "The changes proposed in this Bill will ensure that the Hazardous Substances and New Organisms Act is pitched at the right level to allow genetic modification developments to proceed cautiously while preserving opportunities."

In 2003, as part of its response to the Commission's report, the government commissioned Business and Economic Research Limited (BERL) to investigate the possible impact of the release of genetically modified organisms on the New Zealand economy. The research methodology used "the modelling of four hypothetical scenarios and a snapshot consumer survey" with the aim of providing an "economic analysis of the risks and opportunities that may arise from the use of genetic modification and non-genetic modification technologies". The research identified that New Zealand's 'clean, green image' overseas could be affected by the introduction of GMOs with the risk of changing the intentions of potential foreign purchasers of New Zealand's goods and services, but did note that some of the scenarios showed genetic modification had the potential "to create entirely new products and sectors of economic activity".

As of 2004 no genetically modified food was grown in New Zealand, and no medicines containing live genetically modified organisms had been approved for use. However, medicines manufactured using genetically modified organisms that do not contain live organisms had been approved for sale, and imported foods with genetically modified components were sold. Food Standards Australia New Zealand (FSANZ) were required to approve any food produced from GM crops, or made using genetically engineered enzymes, before it could be marketed in Australia or New Zealand. FSANZ made a list of such approvals available on its website.

==== Published reviews ====
An independent review analysed the level of implementation of the Commission's recommendations by the New Zealand Government mainly during the period 2001-2003. The findings showed that 41% of all recommendations had been fully implemented, mostly in the area of 'Research', while 'Te Tiriti o Waitangi' and 'Preserving Opportunities' were in the 59% of those partially or not implemented. Daniel Pollak, an Ian Axford Fellow in Public Policy, wrote a paper in 2003 that assessed the effectiveness of the Royal Commission's report both in facilitating public participation, and shaping policies that were developed to identify and manage the environmental risks and co-existence of crops due to GMOs within New Zealand. The paper concluded that while the Royal Commission used adequate consultation tools, more processes could have been considered to empower people to be involved in collaborative decision making. It was suggested that the Environmental Risk Management Authority (ERMA) would find it difficult to satisfy everyone because it was confronted with a "lack of universally agreed methods for doing environmental risk assessment" and conflicting demands to avoid being risk-averse, while taking "more intangible considerations beyond science into account". The author contended that crop co-existence and zero tolerance of GM contamination could be costly with some legal uncertainties about the legal status of GMOs that might be introduced to New Zealand inadvertently through seed imports, concluding that "dealing with GMOs will continue to be controversial, and as long as that is the case there will be many trade-offs and balances to manage. New Zealand will have to try to avoid both over-regulating GMOs and under-regulating them".

The New Zealand Society for Risk Management, a group of professionals from the private, government and academic sectors established in 2000, responded to the report of the Commission on 3 August 2001. The Society questioned the degree to which the Commission had been constrained by the Terms of Order in Council provided by the Executive Council of New Zealand in specifying the principles of risk management and concluded there were still issues to be resolved. These included more thorough identification, assessment and prioritising of the risks posed by different forms and uses of genetic technology and further consultation with the community to discuss and inform on the risks and how they could be managed.

A report by The Sustainability Council of New Zealand noted in a 2003 report that many markets rejected GM food, contamination during harvesting and transport was a problem, and there were risks to the environment from GM agriculture. The report concluded that the actions required by the Government were to protect the country's interests, declare New Zealand a GM-free food producer for five years and make appropriate changes to the law for possible releases of GM in the future.

==== Public protests ====
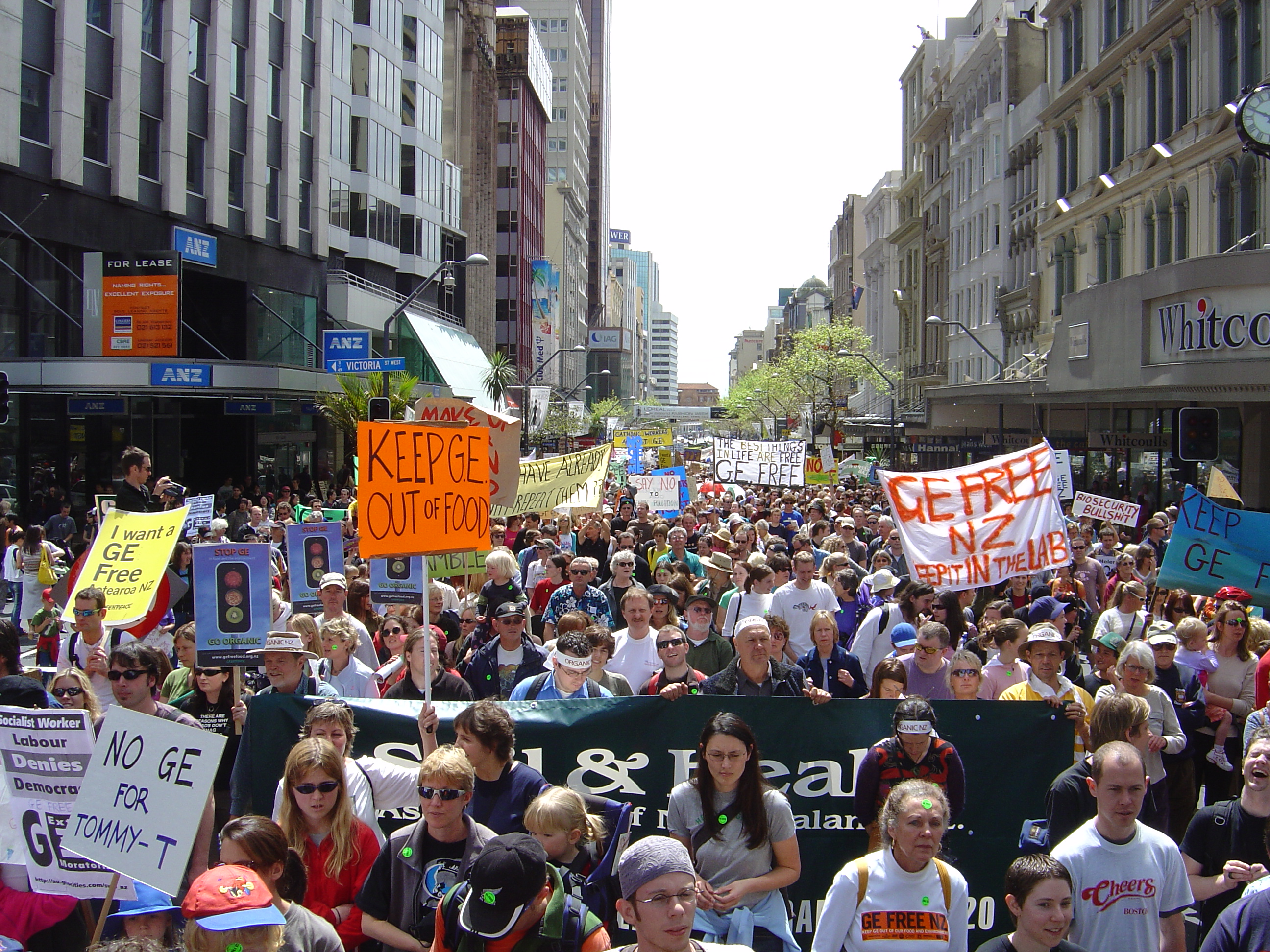
Part of a protest march held in 2003 voicing opposition to genetic engineering, making its way up Queen St, the main thoroughfare of Auckland.

The findings of the Royal Commission and the response of the government led to several protest activities by the public of New Zealand. The GE-Free Day of Action organised by a coalition of GE-Free groups resulted in an estimated 15,000 people gathering in cities around the country on 6 October 2000 and in September 2001 the Auckland GE-Free Coalition organised a rally in Aotea Square, Auckland in which around 10,000 people participated. Jeanette Fitzsimons said the rally demonstrated that in marching for a GE-free future the issue was now a "mainstream concern...[and]...this march was not a negative protest, but a positive celebration of our unique GE-free status and a demonstration of the determination of many New Zealanders to keep it this way".

On 1 November 2001 over two hundred people arrived at Parliament in Wellington after travelling from Northland to protest genetically modified tamarillo field trials carried out by HortResearch in Kerikeri. Sue Bradford welcomed the protesters and noted [that] "many indigenous people in this country, as in other parts of the world, are deeply uncomfortable with the prospect of genetically engineered contamination of the natural world". Another march that began on 22 August 2003 and ended with hundreds of protesters gathering at Parliament on 23 October called for a complete ban on GM in New Zealand and presenting a petition that read:

We, the undersigned, request that Parliament ensure that genetic engineering research takes place only in contained laboratories, that genetically modified organisms are not released into the environment or food chain, and that the moratorium continues for at least five more years until 2008

The hīkoi became known the 'Seed Carriers', because the participants collected seeds on the march and later presented these to the government "in protest at the harm GM could cause to New Zealand’s seed varieties, including native plants.

As part of a nation-wide initiative, an estimated 9000 people marched through the centre of Auckland on 12 October 2003 to protest against the lifting of the moratorium on the commercial release of genetically engineered organisms. Elvira Dommisse, a New Zealand scientist who resigned from her position at the state-owned New Zealand Institute for Crop and Food Research in 1993 because she disagreed with the direction being taken, spoke at one of the rallies. She claimed that there were scientists within New Zealand research institutes and universities who felt that there was too much emphasis on GM research, and she knew some [who were] "totally opposed to the lifting of the moratorium and others who are unhappy about GE but see it as inevitable".

=== Ongoing issues ===
Prior to the 2002 general election, the book Seeds of Distrust was published which highlighted possible contamination of imported corn seed with GMO seeds. During the election campaign the book caused an amount of friction between the Labour and Green Parties, referred to as "Corngate" in the media.

In 2004, the New Zealand Government announced it was going to ratify the Cartagena Protocol on Biosafety. Australian diplomat Alan Oxley quoted Marian Hobbs as saying that New Zealand was doing this to be "a good international citizen" but claimed ratification would undermine the role of the World Trade Organization in protecting New Zealand because the Cartegena Protocol "unequivocally gives parties the right to ban an import of a living modified organism 'without scientific justification'". Alexander Gillespie however, said that "no such language existed in the protocol...what it does allow is for the implementation of the precautionary approach." He further suggested that "as a signatory to the protocol New Zealand will at least be given the chance to change aspects of the international law that it might not like".

A field trial was installed in 2003 for SCION, a Crown Research Institute to look at the impact of genetically altered Pinus radiata trees on the environment. In January 2008 Environmental activists breached the security at the site and damaged 19 of the trees. The media noted that GE Free New Zealand national spokesman Jon Carapiet cautioned that the action could have "caused the spread of contaminated material and harmed New Zealand's green image." Scion's acting chief executive, Elspeth MacRae, said it was "confident no genetically modified material was moved outside the site during the break in...[and]...there [were] no concerns surrounding contamination". No organisation claimed responsibility, but a spade left on the site had a 'GE-free New Zealand' sticker attached to it.

GE-Free New Zealand asked in January 2009 for the withdrawal of the ten-year consent for field trials on broccoli, cabbage, cauliflower and forage kale because it was claimed there had been "two environmental control breaches at the site by not preventing open flowering and not killing living brassica material after the trial finished...[and a]...Biosecurity NZ spokeswoman said yesterday the incident was regarded as serious non-compliance and it was reviewing a range of enforcements".

New Zealand citizens took part in the first global protest against genetically modified food in May 2013. The protest, known as the 'March against Monsanto', was in opposition to the genetically modified food produced by Monsanto. Held across the country, the marches drew attention to Monsanto selling genetically-engineered seeds which were claimed to "resist insecticides and herbicides, add nutritional benefits or otherwise improve crop yields and increase the global food supply".

An Environment Court decision in December 2013 empowered local councils to put policies in place around GMOs in land-based activities, allowing communities to make submissions and raise concerns about the issue in all New Zealand local authorities.

When a group of Nobel Prize winners sent an open letter to Greenpeace in 2016 urging an "end its opposition to genetically-modified food, in particular a new rice which has the potential to reduce disease in third-world countries", several New Zealand scientists came out in support of the letter. Professor and Associate Dean (Research), University of Otago Peter Dearden held "it is time for us to stop believing that all GM is bad and to see that the benefits can far outweigh the risks," and Barry Scott, Professor of Molecular Genetics at Massey University, suggested the report showed how the extreme view of Greenpeace could be challenged by "new technologies associated with gene and genome editing...given changes can now be made to the genome that are similar to those made by non-GM methods such as radiation treatment".

A 2017 paper by a researcher at Lincoln University explored the implications of the controversy around genetic modification for research practices and risk management policies. The point was made that although the HSNO Act determined outdoor research was safe in containing GMOs, public opposition to this resulted in most research being conducted indoors. This required a change of focus to identifying and managing the significant risks associated with GMO research in indoor containment facilities. The author held that because of the overt focus on risks associated with outdoor research, little attention was paid to those in indoor facilities and wondered whether people understood this when debating the issue of GE research. The conclusion was [it]..."is likely that the complexities of this situation will remain hidden as long as the use of outdoor containment facilities remains central to the controversy over GMO research in New Zealand".

=== Calls for review ===
In 2018 a paper in the journal Frontiers in Plant Science made the case that New Zealand's economy was led by the export of plant-based commodities and well-managed integration of gene editing into plant breeding programmes could have potential benefits, [suggesting]..."gene editing offer[ed] the potential to produce a step change in NZ primary industry productivity, biosecurity and speed of innovation". The authors acknowledged why the New Zealand Government took a cautious approach to regulating gene editing but suggested that it "prevents rapid implementation of non-transgenic gene editing" which may be an effective innovation solution necessary to keep the country competitive in international markets. The paper concluded: "The three largest importers of NZ primary products, China, Australia and USA all currently grow GM crops and Australia and China seem likely to follow the lead of USA in not regulating gene edited crops."

Peter Gluckman, a former science advisor to the New Zealand Government suggested in 2018 that a reconsideration of genetic engineering was "long overdue...[and]...the issue needs re-addressing because there have been significant developments over the last 15 years". In the same piece a range of views were shared. Jon Carapiet, the national spokesman for GE-Free New Zealand, urged caution and suggested that while industries can respond "creatively" to regulation, others are "driven by deliberate ignorance to practical proven alternatives such as climate-smart agri-ecology". Bruno Chambers, chair of The Hastings District Council which had a 10-year moratorium in place on genetically modified crops, said he had an open mind about possible benefits from the technology but believed the New Zealand brand in the market would be compromised if the country's crops were not GM-Free. Andrew Allan, professor of plant biology at Auckland University cautioned against a lost opportunity, concluding "without the ability to use gene-editing, New Zealand will be prevented from growing food that is better for the environment and our industries will fall behind our trading partner and competitors". AgResearch principal plant biotechnology scientist Greg Bryan held that the ryegrass that has been developed "could transform farming by reducing its environmental footprint and improving animal productivity". The Prime Minister's chief science advisor Professor Juliet Gerrard, said in July 2019 that the legal and regulatory frameworks around genetic modification did not take new technologies into account and Environment Minister David Parker agreed that some of the new GMO techniques may not be covered by the HSNO Act and he was seeking advice before making changes. Agriculture Minister Damien O'Connor said at the time that New Zealand needed to have a "sensible, mature conversation" about of the opportunities genetic engineering could bring to the country.

Gene editing from a Māori perspective was explored in an article published by Frontiers Media in 2019 at a time when the New Zealand Government was convening a public consultation process to consider possible changes of the regulations around gene editing technologies. The study showed Māori had held strong views about genetically modified organisms and were informed on the effects of biotechnology by cultural values such as whakapapa, mauri (life force), mana, and kaitiakitanga to provide a "cultural scaffold for considering the philosophical, moral, ethical and technical dimensions relevant to the use of gene editing technologies". The paper cautioned that gene-editing technologies can "prioritize commercial interests over community benefit" resulting in "societal sensitivities about inequities", but concluded that "the participants in this study wanted to engage in a constructive discussion to create a robust regulatory framework that addresses gene editing on a case-by-case basis and utilizes Māori values within the decision-making process". Agriculture Minister Damien O'Connor said at the time that New Zealand needed to have a "sensible, mature conversation" about of the opportunities genetic engineering could bring to the country.

In 2019 a group of New Zealand scientists called for a full review of the country's laws related to genetically modified organisms claiming there was now "scientific consensus about the safety of GM crops". Work done by the Royal Society Te Apārangi in the same year also took the position that there needed to be an urgent review of gene editing in New Zealand. The panel co-chair David Penman said that New Zealand [needed] "to have its own perspective given our unique cultural heritage and environment, the special challenges we face in maintaining our biodiversity and a viable and productive primary industry, and our unique regulatory environment". The Society produced a series of scenarios that identified and assessed the possible risks and benefits of gene editing technologies in the primary sector in New Zealand. The case studies considered how the technology could be used "within and outside the human food chain...[and with]...agricultural plants and animals".A further paper, Gene Editing Legal and Regulatory Implications presented six recommendations if New Zealand was to have a regulatory framework that recognized the principles of Te Tiriti o Waitangi, met its ethical obligation as a global citizen, and reflected strong relationships between New Zealand industries, research communities and local and central government.

By 2020 there were calls for the New Zealand Government to appreciate the role of biotechnology, including some genetic engineering, in addressing the issues of climate change, in particular the reduction of emissions. One of a series of recommendations in a report by Biotech New Zealand was to "increase public discussion and understanding of genetic modification and its various methods, their safety and practical application...[and]...undertake review of regulations relating to biotechnology and genetics".. The document also noted that forty eight percent of the country's greenhouse gas emissions were from agriculture but there were important developments in the use of biotechnology tools that could mitigate some of this. The report identified research by AgResearch to develop a genetically modified ryegrass, that "strikes a balance between reductions in greenhouse gas emissions, greater tolerance to drought and farm productivity" and work by the same organisation on white clover using genetic transformation to "increase the levels of condensed tannins (CT) as they are highly desirable in forage as they sequester dietary protein and reduce bloat and methane emissions in ruminants". Modelling from the study also predicted that less nitrogen would be excreted into the environment by animals feeding on the ryegrass, and therefore less leaching of nitrate and lower emissions of nitrous oxide. This work by AgResearch had been discussed in 2019 in an article claiming that it reflected the progress New Zealand was making in the area of genetically modified crops that were likely to reduce emissions. A principal scientist working on the ryegrass project said it would "produce 23% less methane from dairy livestock it feeds". An Auckland academic took the position that the possibility of genetic modification helping New Zealand's respond to climate change was a key driver in shifting the debate about the issue. The contention was that some genetically modified plants could be better suited to rising temperatures and grasses produced using this technology reduced emissions from animals that eat them. The author concluded: "the climate crisis is here, and we and our primary industries will need all the science-based tools we have to fight against, and survive, rising temperatures".

=== Political responses ===
==== Labour government ====
The New Zealand Government authorised The New Zealand Productivity Commission to investigate factors that could be inhibiting or detracting from the productivity of firms in the country and the Commission's report in April 2021 identified a full review of the regulation of genetic modification as key to enhancing innovation. Specifically, the report noted [that] "timely access to new plant genetic material is critical for New Zealand’s primary sector to retain and build its competitive advantage in international markets". In his response to the report, Stuart Nash the Economic Development Minister, did not note food directly, but acknowledged the importance of [supporting] "internationally-focussed growth and innovation...[and retaining]...links to global research, science and technology". The release of the Commission's report prompted debate in the New Zealand media. Radio New Zealand detailed the recommendations of the report, particularly those aimed at removing constraints to innovation in line with new techniques reflecting the precision of gene editing. The article noted that the Ministry for the Environment had also stated the "regulatory settings were quickly becoming outdated and hard to enforce in 2018, referring to a 2014 court decision that adopted a strict definition of the not-GM regulations", and there was a move amongst countries toward less regulation based on scientific risk assessments. Another commentator claimed that despite the Commission's report there was little public interest in changing the regulations although there were still two sides to the argument, from defending the legislation because it controlled the spread of GMOs to how it could be modified to help cut agricultural emissions. An item in Newshub on 25 June 2022 quoted a scientist who said he was frustrated that it was not possible to use new genetic technology to explore options with plants. The article also put the position of those who claim that genetic modification would not be effective in lowering emissions, citing Steve Abel from Greenpeace who said: "the time frames that it takes to develop these technologies and test them and prove them are not the timeframes we have. We need to act now on what we know will address the problem of climate change".

Emily King, a former environmental lawyer and author of Re-food, urged a continuation of the cautious approach New Zealand had taken to regulation of gene modification and editing. In her book, King advocates for a "food systems approach...to consider the full process of getting food from farm to table" as a context for reducing emissions during food production, noting that "while farmers and growers create emissions, manufacturers and consumers do too through food waste".

Research by John Caradus in 2022, assessed the risks, opportunities and impacts of using GM crops concluding:

GM crops provide considerable benefits and are a valuable option that needs to be employed to solve many of the current challenges facing mankind and as a result improve not simply economic outcomes but also the environment. GM technologies like many non-GM technologies can bring risks, but these can be monitored and quantified and allow decisions to be made about commercial, societal and environmental benefits versus real risks.

A spokesperson for one pro-Gm New Zealand organisation BioTechNZ, said public attitudes toward GM might have shifted, but GE-Free NZ questioned the motives for a review and feared it could lead to deregulation putting people and nature at risk. Andrew Hoggard from Federated Farmers suggested the agriculture sector needed to partake in research being done elsewhere in the world because there were "big gains for them and the environment." The Environment Minister David Parker clarified that the debate would be "restricted to just medicines, saying there is still a suspicion around genetically-modified food".

Parker confirmed with Newshub on 26 June 2022 that the government was going to review genetic modification regulations to see if they aligned with new biomedical and laboratory research. He said the goal was to make research easier but there was no intention to change regulations around the release of genetically modified organisms into the environment. In February 2023 Science New Zealand stressed the importance of New Zealand having an informed debate about genetic technologies to ensure that any regulations to control it are developed from an informed approach to both the risks and benefits. The article suggested that modern gene-editing tools can potentially more quickly develop "new varieties of plants providing sustainable and nutritious food or organisms that grow the materials needed for a sustainable low-carbon bioeconomy", but the current legislation makes research expensive for CRIs. The paper acknowledged that the Prime Minister’s Chief Science Adviser has noted that there is a need for different approaches to a "spectrum of genetic modification technologies", and concluded: "In the view of the Crown Research Institutes, it is time to...consider how New Zealand may appropriately take advantage of new knowledge to advance the wellbeing of the people and the country."

Tony Conner, New Zealand biochemist and geneticist, made the case for a review of the regulations to allow field testing and the release of GM crops. He claimed that there were significant benefits from industries in the country growing genetically modified crops, including more nutritious food with a longer storage life, less waste from fruit and vegetables with "fewer blemishes from pest and disease damage", higher yields for producers and the development of plants that could reduce greenhouse gas emissions and be "better adapted to the forthcoming constraints of climate change (e.g. winter chilling for fruit production)".

On 27 June 2023 the New Zealand Government announced a consultation process to get feedback on proposed changes to the regulations around genetically modified organisms. David Parker said the changes would remove barriers to laboratory research but would not change rules for field trials or regulations to the release of GMOs such as plants or animals into the environment. Ten proposed changes were identified for consideration during the consultation beginning on 3 July 2023 and closing on 25 August 2023. The response to the proposed changes was generally positive but one scientist did question the rationale for allowing the use of genetic modification for medical purposes but not to "make genetically-modified foods, or even give genetically-modified grass to cows".

As New Zealand approached a general election scheduled for October 2023, gene editing and genetic modification became a political issue in the media. Denise Conroy, a programme leader at Plant & Food Research told Kathryn Ryan on Radio New Zealand that focus groups her organisation were running showed that people in the country wanted to get clear information about gene editing and genetic modification as the debate had only recently become a discussion in the media, and they "didn't have the tools or knowledge to make informed decisions". Conroy said people understood the technology could be beneficial, but needed reassurance that the benefits were "much more convincing than the perceived risks". Surveys conducted by Plant & Food Research showed that consumers in Australia and New Zealand had similar levels of acceptance of food produced using genetic engineering, with "about 43 percent willing to purchase this type of produce".

==== Coalition government ====
On 13 August 24 Minister of Science, Innovation and Technology Judith Collins announced that the National-led coalition government would end the ban on gene technology outside of the laboratory, removing "restrictive rules and time-consuming processes...[bringing]...New Zealand up to global best practice and ensure we can capitalise on the benefits". Prime Minister Christopher Luxon said legislation and "a dedicated new regulator [would] oversee the new technology to ensure it is used safely". One media commentator explained a range of activities that the changes would enable, noted public responses from an earlier poll and summarised counter-arguments. Political responses were mixed. Speaking on behalf of the Act Party, Parmjeet Parmar claimed the move will mean the "brightest scientific minds will be freer to make advancements that will lift human flourishing, improve environmental outcomes, and create major commercial opportunities", while in the same piece Labour's Deborah Russell urged the government to be transparent as the change was "new territory". Steve Abel put the Green Party's position "that a wide-ranging and robust public discussion is required about scientific developments in gene-editing and related technology before any changes can be considered to the regulatory framework in the Hazardous Substances and New Organism Act". A report presenting research findings into how New Zealanders perceived genetic technologies for environmental and conservation purposes was published in July 2024. Following the announcement of the Government's plan, the authors backgrounded the research, noting it had been carried out in two streams: The Māori Biodiversity Network engaging with Māori, while social scientists engaged with the general public and interest groups. The purpose of the research was to gain insights into what "safe and responsible environmental genetic innovation [meant] for New Zealanders", and the researchers concluded that conversations with a diverse community were complex because "discussions about gene technology bring strong reactions based on people’s values and beliefs...[being]...especially pointed when talking about the use of these technologies in conservation, environmental protection and food". All participants discussed the risks and potential of the new technologies and the need for "high levels of regulation and oversight...and continuous research, particularly in contained environments, to monitor and evaluate the impacts of genetic technology". Issues of trust and who might control the technologies were raised in both groups.

In November 2024, Organics Aotearoa New Zealand (OANZ) raised concerns about the proposed reforms to regulate genetic engineering. OANZ chief Executive Tiffany Tompkins said that the proposed changes were not likely to be adopted by New Zealand's major trading partners, [making the country] "an international outlier, risking environmental and economic consequences", evidence that after thirty years of research, "the supposed benefits of GE have not been realised, and its risks remain unresolved". Mark Patterson, in his capacity as Minister for Rural Communities, agreed that OANZ should have been engaged with earlier because of the importance of organic farmers and growers in New Zealand's primary sector and Judith Collins explained that legislative changes were consistent with regulations in other countries. In the same piece, it was noted that the Ministry for Business, Innovations and Employment (MBIE) had provided assurance to the organic sector that there would be full risk assessment and public consultation before licences were confirmed. OANZ however, questioned the government's "economic benefits data", remaining concerned that any rewards might not outweigh the risks.
