= Woodenhead =

- Directed by: Florian Habicht
- Written by: Florian Habicht
- Produced by: Florian Habicht
- Starring: Nicholas Butler (NZ); Teresa Peters; Steve Abel; Mardi Potter
- Cinematography: Christopher Pryor
- Music by: Marc Chesterman; Steve Abel; Mardi Potter
- Distributed by: Olive Films
- Release date: 2003
- Running time: 90 minutes
- Country: New Zealand
- Language: English

Woodenhead is a 2003 New Zealand film directed by Florian Habicht.

The film is a dark fairy tale in the style of the Brothers Grimm, and recounts the story of a dump-hand called Gert escorting a princess called Plum to her wedding. The two wander into the forest with a donkey and mysterious things start to happen. The film explores the dark sexual material in this mythic context.

The film is unusual in that the sound and music were recorded before the film was shot, and does not match the visuals. It is in crisp black and white and was shot in the Northland Region. The voices of the main two characters are musicians Steve Abel and Mardi Potter and the actors are Nicholas Butler and Teresa Peters.

The film was shown at the 2003 Auckland, Wellington, Melbourne, and Sitges international film festivals, and screened again, in colourised form, at New Zealand International Film Festival 2021 and 2022. Woodenhead was released on DVD by Olive Films. TV Guide rated the film 3 out of 4 stars. Composer Marc Chesterman released the soundtrack on double vinyl in 2022. Woodenhead Reimagined contains the soundtrack on one album and a bonus album of Reimagined songs, inspired by the soundtrack and music of 'Woodenhead'. Contributing artists include Scott Mannion, Charlotte Yates, epsilon-blue, Mimi Gilbert, Demarnia Lloyd, Hermione Johnson, Chris Winter & Gram Antler, Ryan Smith, Jeff Holdaway, Somme, Jeremy Veal, Craig Sengelow, Sebastian Macaulay & Zoe Iannou, and Shaun D Wilson. Director Florian Habicht and Woodenhead Production Designer Teresa Peters made new and original artwork for the album cover and insert booklet.

Florian Habicht has also made a film called Kaikohe Demolition, a loving look at the demolition derby in his hometown Kaikohe, and Rubbings from a Live Man, an intimate documentary about New Zealand actor, writer and director Warwick Broadhead.

== Trivia ==
Habicht states on the DVD that the film was inspired by a dream in which two angels appearing as Milli Vanilli fly into a stadium and tell him that the band lip-synched their music, apparently unaware that this is common knowledge. They then tell him to make a film where the sound is recorded before the visuals.

While it would have been hard to resist such a disarming directive, Habicht realised there were also some definite advantages in making a low-budget film in this way. It enabled him to focus separately on the visual and aural components of the film, allowing him, for example, to cast people who had the look he wanted but who weren't necessarily trained as actors. With a limited amount of money to spend on the film (around $30,000), Habicht also realised that he could achieve much higher quality results by taking care of the sound in a recording studio, rather than on location. He didn't need to take a sound recordist with him on the shoot, and normal concerns such as traffic noise were a non-issue.

Furthermore, this style of filmmaking suited the filmmaker's intuitive style perfectly, giving the film a surreal, otherworldly feel. As well as being literally out of synch, he also accentuated the oddness by mismatching the soundtrack with what you see – often you'll find sweet and innocent dialogue accompanying grotesque and sometimes violent visuals or a South Island kea screeching on a North Auckland road. He also enjoyed giving the actors voices that were incongruous with the way they looked.
