= The Travel Companion =

2025 film directed by Alex Mallis and Travis Wood

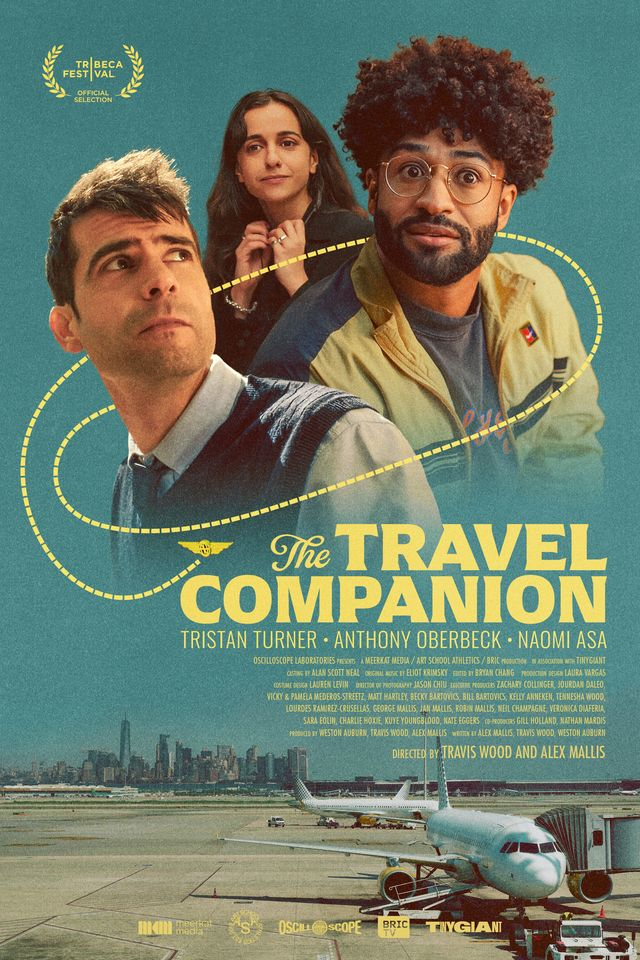
- Directed by: Travis Wood; Alex Mallis
- Written by: Alex Mallis; Travis Wood; Weston Auburn
- Produced by: Weston Auburn; Travis Wood; Alex Mallis
- Starring: Tristan Turner; Anthony Oberbeck; Naomi Asa
- Cinematography: Jason Chiu
- Edited by: Bryan Chang
- Music by: Eliot Krimsky
- Production companies: Meerkat Media; BRIC TV; Art School Athletics; Tinygiant
- Distributed by: Oscilloscope Laboratories
- Release dates: June 5, 2025 (Tribeca Festival); April 10, 2026 (United States)
- Running time: 91 minutes
- Country: United States
- Language: English

The Travel Companion is a 2025 American comedy drama film directed by Travis Wood and Alex Mallis in their directorial debut, co-written with Weston Auburn. The film stars Tristan Turner, Anthony Oberbeck and Naomi Asa. The film follows Simon (Tristan Turner), a struggling documentary filmmaker, who enjoys free flights courtesy of his best friend and roommate, Bruce (Anthony Oberbeck), who works for an airlines. However, when Beatrice (Naomi Asa), a more successful filmmaker, enters the picture and starts dating Bruce, Simon risks flying to close to the sun.

The film premiered at the 2025 Tribeca Festival on June 5, 2025, and received a limited theatrical release in the United States on April 10, 2026.

== Plot ==
Simon (Tristan Turner), a struggling independent documentary filmmaker, lives in New York City with his best friend and roommate Bruce (Anthony Oberbeck), who works for an airline. As Bruce's designated travel companion, Simon has access to free standby flights, which he frequently uses to gather footage for his ambitious but loosely defined documentary project about humanity.

When Bruce begins dating Beatrice (Naomi Asa), a fellow independent filmmaker, Simon becomes increasingly anxious that he will lose his travel privileges. His growing obsession with maintaining the arrangement strains his friendship and leads to escalating tension.

== Cast ==
- Tristan Turner as Simon
- Anthony Oberbeck as Bruce
- Naomi Asa as Beatrice
- Anil Joseph as Jafar, taxi driver
- Dara Messinger as Renee, film programmer
- Raheem Roher as Junior
- Peter Davis as Tour Guide
- Peter Fairman as Simon's Manager
- Daryush Parsi as Ali, deli owner
- Joanna Arnow as Jess, Q&A filmmaker
- Steven Phillips-Horst as Steven, Q&A filmmaker

== Production ==
The film was shot in New York City in just 15 days during the fall of 2024. It marks the feature directorial debut of both Alex Mallis and Travis Wood. The story was inspired by a real-life experience of co-director Travis Wood, who received a friends airline employee benefits for standby travel. Mallis, Wood and Weston Auburn co-wrote the screenplay and also produced the film.

The film is a production of Meerkat Media, BRIC and Art School Athletics, in association with Tinygiant. Executive producers include Neil Champagne, Veronica Diaferia, Sara Eolin, Nate Eggers, Charlie Hoxie, Kuye Youngblood, Zachary Collinger, Jourdan Daleo, Vicky & Pamela Mederos-Streetz, Matt Hartley, Becky Bartovics, Bill Bartovics, Kelly Anneken, Tennesha Wood, Lourdes Ramirez-Crusellas, George Mallis, Jan Mallis and Robin Mallis. Co-producers are Gill Holland and Nathan Mardis.

== Release ==
The film had its world premiere in the U.S. Narrative Competition at the 2025 Tribeca Festival. Oscilloscope Laboratories acquired North American distribution rights. The film received a limited theatrical release in the United States beginning April 10, 2026, with initial screenings at BAM Rose Cinemas in Brooklyn, New York, followed by additional markets.

== Reception ==
On the review aggregator website Rotten Tomatoes, 93% of 41 critics' reviews are positive. The website's consensus reads: "Despite brushing against familiar indie clichés, The Travel Companion remains a sharply observed, quirky character study that evolves into a bittersweet and incisive critique of creative ambition." On Metacritic, the film has a weighted average score of 69 out of 100 based on 4 critics, which the site labels as "generally favorable" reviews.

Jason Delgado of Film Threat gave the film a score of 7.5 out of 10, writing, "a friendship that has changed in dynamics due to the other person entering a romantic relationship." Stephen Saito for Moveable Fest described the score as "a gently amusing satire about coping with the frustrating waiting game that usually eludes detection as a part of filmmaking."
