= Seeds of Distrust =

Book by Nicky Hager

Seeds of Distrust: The Story of a GE Cover-up
- Author: Nicky Hager
- Subject: Politics, genetic engineering, New Zealand
- Publisher: Craig Potton Publishing
- Publication date: 2002
- Publication place: New Zealand
- ISBN: 0-908802-92-7

Seeds of Distrust: The Story of a GE Cover-up was a study of government processes and decision making under New Zealand's Labour-led government written by Nicky Hager. The setting was an incident in November 2000, during the Royal Commission on Genetic Modification, when government officials were alerted to evidence of an accidental release of genetically modified corn plants, which was illegal under New Zealand law. The book traces the stages of industry lobbying and government decision making leading up to a decision to regard the incident as insignificant and keep it secret from the public.

The book was released in July 2002, ahead of the general election, and helped make genetically modified organisms a major election issue. In denying Hager's claims, the Minister for the Environment, Marian Hobbs, accused him of writing "conspiracy theories". At a media conference of government officials convened immediately after the book's release, the Chief Executive of the Ministry for the Environment, Barry Carbon, conceded that the book was largely accurate but disputed the interpretation of the material.

The Christchurch newspaper The Press studied the official documents and concluded: "So who's telling the truth, Hager or the Government? Officials at a special briefing for journalists last week memorably commented that they did not disagree with most of Hager's facts, just his conclusions. That is unsurprising, given that the conclusions that can be drawn are not palatable ones. The documents raise some serious questions about the level of open government New Zealand really has and the strength of our much-vaunted biosecurity regime."

There was further intensity when news anchor John Campbell interviewed Prime Minister Helen Clark about the issue. It ended with Clark labelling Campbell a "sanctimonious little creep" due to what she considered the ambush style of the interview. The Broadcasting Standards Authority (BSA) later ruled that the infamous "Corngate" interview was unbalanced, unfair and lacked impartiality and objectivity.

== See also ==
- Genetic engineering in New Zealand
