= Not Your Typical Bigfoot Movie =

- Directed by: Jay Delaney
- Produced by: Jay Delaney
- Starring: Dallas Gilbert; Wayne Burton
- Cinematography: Shane Allen Davis
- Edited by: Jay Delaney
- Music by: Justin Riley; Ben Colburn
- Distributed by: Oscilloscope Laboratories
- Release date: October 17, 2008 (Pioneer Theater)
- Running time: 63 minutes
- Country: United States
- Language: English

Not Your Typical Bigfoot Movie is a 2008 American documentary film about Dallas Gilbert and Wayne Burton, two Bigfoot researchers from Portsmouth, Ohio. The documentary was directed by Jay Delaney.

== Release ==
The film was released at the Pioneer Theater in New York on October 17, 2008.

== Reception ==
The film has an 80% rating on Rotten Tomatoes. Ed Gonzalez of Slant Magazine awarded the film two stars out of four. Mel Valentin of Slash Film gave it a 6 out of 10.
