= May It Last: A Portrait of The Avett Brothers =

- Directed by: Judd Apatow; Michael Bonfiglio
- Produced by: Judd Apatow; Michael Bonfiglio
- Starring: The Avett Brothers
- Cinematography: Jonathan Furmanski
- Edited by: Paul Little
- Distributed by: Oscilloscope Laboratories
- Release date: September 12, 2017
- Running time: 103 minutes
- Country: United States
- Language: English

May It Last: A Portrait of The Avett Brothers is a 2017 American documentary film about the Avett Brothers. The documentary was directed by Judd Apatow and Michael Bonfiglio.

== Release ==
The film was released on September 12, 2017. The film also premiered on HBO on January 29, 2018.

== Reception ==
The film has an 89% rating on Rotten Tomatoes based on nine reviews.

Linda Holmes of NPR gave the film a positive review and wrote, "It's a fine film, both as a music documentary and as a family story."

The Hollywood Reporter also gave the film a positive review: "An excellent blend of musical behind-the-scenes, open-hearted interviews and performance."
