= Report of the Royal Commission on Genetic Modification =

Book by Royal Commission on Genetic Modification

- Author: Royal Commission on Genetic Modification, Chairperson: Thomas Eichelbaum
- Language: English
- Subject: Genetic engineering
- Genre: Non-fiction, report
- Publisher: Royal Commission on Genetic Modification
- Publication date: 2001
- Publication place: New Zealand
- ISBN: 0-477-01943-9 (set); ISBN 0-477-01944-7 (report); ISBN 0-477-01945-5 (app. 1); ISBN 0-477-01946-3 (app. 2); ISBN 0-477-01947-1 (app. 3); ISBN 0-477-01952-8 (CD-ROM)
- OCLC: 47921663
- Dewey Decimal: 354.5 21
- LC Class: TP248.6 .N49 2001

Report of the Royal Commission on Genetic Modification was published in 2001 by the government appointed Royal Commission on Genetic Modification.

Thomas Eichelbaum chaired the Royal Commission on Genetic Modification.

== See also ==
- Genetic engineering in New Zealand
