= Travis Wood (filmmaker) =

American filmmaker

- Born: U.S.
- Occupations: Director, screenwriter and producer
- Years active: 2019–present

Travis Wood is an American filmmaker. He is known for his debut feature The Travel Companion.

== Career ==
Wood directed several short films including Kayla in 1A, It's Called Gentrification, and Dollar Pizza Documentary, all of which received Vimeo Staff Picks. His 2020 short documentary Affurmative Action, was selected for the SXSW film festival, the film examines workplace diversity by scrolling through company "meet the team" pages and notes the frequent inclusion of dogs while having no Black employees.

In 2022, Wood was selected as one of ten filmmakers for Lena Waithe’s Rising Voices program. As part of the program he directed the short film Black Santa (2022), which premiered at 2022 Tribeca Festival and follows a father who works as a mall Santa with his son while addressing themes of representation. The film won the Black & Unlimited Fatherhood Project Award at the 2024 American Black Film Festival.

In 2025, Wood’s debut feature, The Travel Companion, co-directed with Alex Mallis, premiered in the U.S. Narrative Competition at the Tribeca Festival. Inspired by his experience with standby flight benefits, the film follows a filmmaker whose free travel access is threatened when his roommate begins a new relationship.

Wood was named a recipient of the 2026 McKnight Fellowships for Media Artists, administered by FilmNorth in partnership with the McKnight Foundation. He is a member of Meerkat Media, a filmmaking collective and cooperative.

== Filmography ==
=== Short film ===
Year	Title	Director	Writer	Producer	Editor	Notes	Ref.
2017	Hello Nostrand	Yes	Yes	Yes	Yes		
2017	One Peg Boss	Yes	Yes	Yes	Yes		
2018	It's Called Gentrification	Yes	Yes	Yes	Yes		
2018	Kayla in 1A	Yes	Yes	Yes	Yes		
2020	Affurmative Action	Yes	Yes	Yes	Yes		
2022	Ten & Two	Yes	Yes	Yes	No		
2022	Black Santa	Yes	Yes	Yes	No	Co-written with Weston Auburn	
2023	Dollar Pizza Pizza Documentary	Yes	Yes	Yes	Yes	Co-Directed with Alex Mallis	

=== Documentary series ===
Year	Title	Director	Notes
2025	Art in the Twenty-First Century	Yes	Dyani White-Hawk segment

=== Feature film ===
Year	Title	Director	Writer	Producer	Editor	Notes	Ref.
2025	The Travel Companion	Yes	Yes	Yes	No	Co-Directed with Alex Mallis	

== Awards and nominations ==
Year	Result	Award	Category	Work	Ref.
2020	Nominated	SXSW Film Festival	Documentary Short	Affurmative Action	
2023	Nominated	BlackStar Film Festival	Best Short Narrative	Black Santa	
2025	Nominated	Tribeca Festival	Best U.S. Narrative Feature	The Travel Companion	
2025	Won	New Hampshire Film Festival	Best NH Narrative Feature	The Travel Companion	
