= Combat Obscura =

- Directed by: Miles Lagoze
- Produced by: Miles Lagoze
- Cinematography: Miles Lagoze
- Edited by: Eric Schuman
- Distributed by: Oscilloscope Laboratories
- Release dates: March 1, 2018 (True/False); March 15, 2019 (United States)
- Running time: 70 minutes
- Country: United States
- Language: English
- Box office: $10,100 (United States)

Combat Obscura is a 2018 documentary film about the War in Afghanistan, and the directorial debut of Miles Lagoze.

== Background ==
Combat Obscura is composed of video footage taken from 2011 to 2012 by lance corporal Miles Lagoze and other cameramen from the 1st Battalion, 6th Marines, in Sangin-Kajaki, Afghanistan. As a combat photographer, the footage was originally shot for recruitment and propaganda purposes. After realising the film would have been unsuitable for propaganda due to its depiction of Marines swearing and smoking cannabis, Lagoze proceeded to get it declassified so that he could keep it as a memory of his time in Afghanistan. Lagoze left the Marines in 2013, and when studying film at Columbia University in 2018, he decided to start compiling the footage into a documentary. As the documentary was shot with government-owned cameras, the Marine Corps threatened to take legal action against Lagoze, but did not follow through, officially withdrawing their threat on February 28, 2019.

== Synopsis ==
Combat Obscura does not feature an overarching narrative, instead being composed of various disjointed scenes showing Marines in combat and R&R. The film lacks a narrator, as Lagoze wanted to show an unfiltered view of war, saying "I think we’re at a point as veterans that we want to show war as it is. We’re kind of sick of the hero-worshipping."

This whole myth of the trauma hero of American war narratives — I didn’t want to do that. Every American war narrative tends to revolve around, Johnny’s got this naive notion of war, and he goes over and it’s not what he expected, and it’s total chaos and horror, and then he comes back, and he has no way to express what it was like. When I first set out to make the film, I did interviews with a lot of the guys that were in the film, in the present. When I started to get rid of that, I think that’s when it became more honest.

— Miles Lagoze

== Release ==
Combat Obscura premiered on March 1, 2018, at the True/False Film Festival, AFI Docs and FIDMarseille, among others, wherein "the audience loved it." It was released for select screening and video on demand on March 15, 2019.

== Reception ==
On Rotten Tomatoes, Combat Obscura has a 100% score, whereas on Metacritic, it has an average of 56%, indicating "mixed or average" reviews. Some reviewers contrasted the film negatively with Restrepo, another war documentary which employed a similar style of filmmaking, but included interviews, and suggested that Combat Obscura's lack of context made it difficult to understand. Conversely, The Daily Beast called it "one of the best documentaries in years". Garcia Lawrence of The A.V. Club compared the film to The 15:17 to Paris, a war film released the previous year: "If The 15:17 To Paris saw three men who managed, against all odds, to fulfill their deeply ingrained ideals and become American heroes (“We got lucky,” one of them says toward the end), then Combat Obscura observes the countless others for whom heroism is no longer in the cards."
