= Sophie Jones (film) =

2020 American drama film by Jessie Barr

- Poster
- Directed by: Jessie Barr
- Written by: Jessica Barr; Jessie Barr
- Produced by: Jessie Barr; Joe Dinnen; Lindsay Guerrero; Jessica Barr
- Starring: Jessica Barr; Skyler Verity; Claire Manning; Charlie Jackson; Dave Roberts
- Cinematography: Scott Miller
- Edited by: Naomi Sunrise Filoramo
- Music by: Nate Heller
- Production company: Sounding Board
- Distributed by: Oscilloscope
- Release dates: September 2020 (Deauville); March 2, 2021
- Running time: 85 minutes
- Country: United States
- Language: English

Sophie Jones is a 2020 American drama film directed, co-written, and produced by Jessie Barr. The film is executive produced by Nicole Holofcener and stars Jessica Barr as a 16-year-old navigating grief, girlhood, and growing up in Portland, Oregon. It also stars Skyler Verity, Claire Manning, Charlie Jackson, and Dave Roberts. The film premiered at the 2020 Deauville Film Festival and had a limited release on March 2, 2021, by Oscilloscope Laboratories. It won Best Feature Film (NEXT Section) at the Americana Film Festival 2022 in Barcelona, Spain. The original motion picture soundtrack was released on April 1, 2022, by Gardener Recordings, featuring an original score by Grammy-nominated composer Nate Heller.

== Plot ==
Stunned by the untimely death of her mother and struggling with the myriad challenges of teendom, Sophie tries everything she can to feel something again, while holding herself together.

== Cast ==
- Jessica Barr as Sophie Jones
- Syler Verity as Kevin
- Claire Manning as Claire
- Charlie Jackson as Lucy
- Dave Roberts as Aaron

== Release ==
In January 2021, it was announced that Oscilloscope acquired North American distribution rights to the film, which was released in select theaters and on VOD on March 2, 2021.

== Reception ==
The film has a 100% rating on Rotten Tomatoes based on 19 reviews.

Courtney Howard of Variety gave the film a positive review and wrote, "it’s a poignant exploration of this arduous age, rooted in staggering authenticity."

Roxana Hadadi of RogerEbert.com awarded the film three stars and wrote that the film "feels deeply authentic in its understanding of grief."

Kate Erbland of IndieWire graded the film a B− and wrote, "It’s moments like that one which speak to the film’s real power: honesty, even when it hurts. Grief, maybe even the good kind."

Lena Wilson of The Playlist called the film “A refreshing, deeply human meditation on girlhood, sex, and grief…coming-of-age at its best. A quiet, brilliant film.”
