= Germania Bank Building (New York City) =

Historic building in Manhattan, New York

- U.S. Historic district – Contributing property
- New York City Landmark
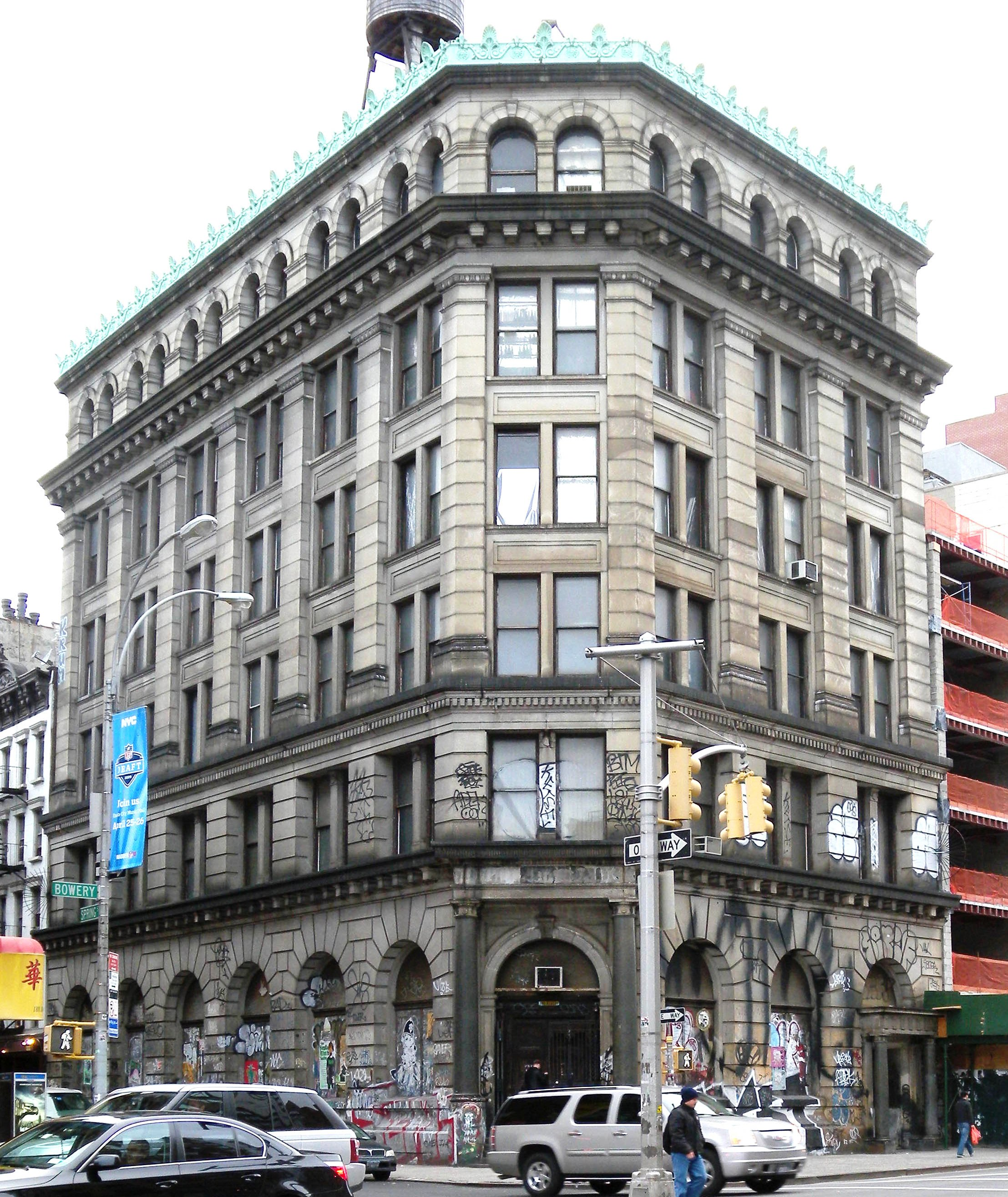
- Germania Bank Building in 2009

- Location within Manhattan Location within New York City Location within New York Location within the United States
- Location: 190 Bowery, Manhattan, New York, US
- Coordinates: 40°43′16″N 73°59′39″W
- Built: 1898–99
- Architect: Robert Maynicke
- Architectural style: Renaissance Revival or Beaux Arts
- Part of: The Bowery Historic District (ID13000027)
- NYCL No.: 2162

Significant dates
- Designated CP: February 20, 2013
- Designated NYCL: March 29, 2005

The Germania Bank Building is a historic building at 190 Bowery, on the northwest corner of the intersection with Spring Street in Manhattan, New York City. It was the third building of the Germania Bank, which was founded in New York City in 1869. The building was designed in a Renaissance Revival or Beaux Arts style by Robert Maynicke and was built in 1898–99. The building became a New York City designated landmark on March 29, 2005. Widely known for the "Supreme" store on the first floor. The floors above formerly held studio residencies for renowned artists such as Keith Haring, Jean-Michel Basquiat, and Lucine Kaplan.

== Description ==
The building has six stories, built of brick supported by steel girders over a concrete basement. The Bowery and Spring Street facades are both clad in Maine granite, with the original public spaces contained in a rusticated base with large, deep-set windows surmounted by rounded arches. Above this, the facades consist of banded stonework with three identical bays of paired windows facing the Bowery and six facing Spring Street. The third, fourth, and fifth floors have projecting piers and paneled spandrels between the windows; the sixth-floor windows have round arches. A cornice with modillions runs above the first story, and a heavier cornice decorated with fillets, ovolos, and cyma moldings above the fifth. At the roofline is a copper parapet, in the style of a classical sima, which features anthemia, rosettes, and waves and would have been noticeable including from elevated trains.

The main entrance is in an angled corner bay and consists of a projecting portico with bluestone steps, while a second entrance in a portico facing the Bowery is at street level. Both porticos have free-standing Tuscan columns and elaborate wrought-iron gates; the main doorway also has paneled pilasters on either side and is topped by an arched transom.

The other two facades are of brick, as are the roof parapets. The north side has windows protected by steel shutters. The original sash windows were in place as of 2005, but transoms over the main entrance and ground-floor windows were blocked with acrylic panels. Interior changes include modification of the banking hall in 1922, the addition of more stairs in 1924, additional fireproofing by the 1960s to accommodate storage of records on the upper floors, and later alterations for residential use, including the creation of a basketball court in the former banking hall.

== History ==
During the middle decades of the 19th century, rising numbers of German immigrants in New York led to the development of a neighborhood called Kleindeutschland or Little Germany, which became the most important German-American center in the United States. It had a commercial center on the Bowery north of Division Street. The Germania Bank of the City of New York was established by local businessmen in 1869 in leased premises at 185 Bowery; its first president was Christian Schwarzwaelder, owner of a furniture store on East Broadway, and the vice-president, Joseph Kuntz, owned a brewery on Houston Street and lived on the Bowery.

In 1878 the Germania Bank moved to a purchased loft building at 215 Bowery; in the early 1890s it expanded into 217 Bowery next door. To accommodate continued growth, in December 1896 the bank bought three lots at the northwest corner of the Bowery and Spring Street. Plans for a new freestanding, fireproof building were filed on January 3, 1898; it was designed by the German-born architect Robert Maynicke and is considered one of his major works. The construction firm of Marc Eidlitz, an American of German descent, built it at a cost of around $200,000. Construction began on February 4, 1898, and was certified complete on January 21, 1899. The bank had already opened for public inspection on December 28, 1898, and for business on January 3, 1899, the one-year anniversary of the plans being filed.

The president of the Germania Bank at the time was Edward C. Schaefer. The building originally contained a public banking hall on the first floor, safe deposit vaults in the basement, and office spaces including the president's office and the meeting room for the Board of Directors. In 1900 the bank published a promotional pamphlet emphasizing the security of the vaults.

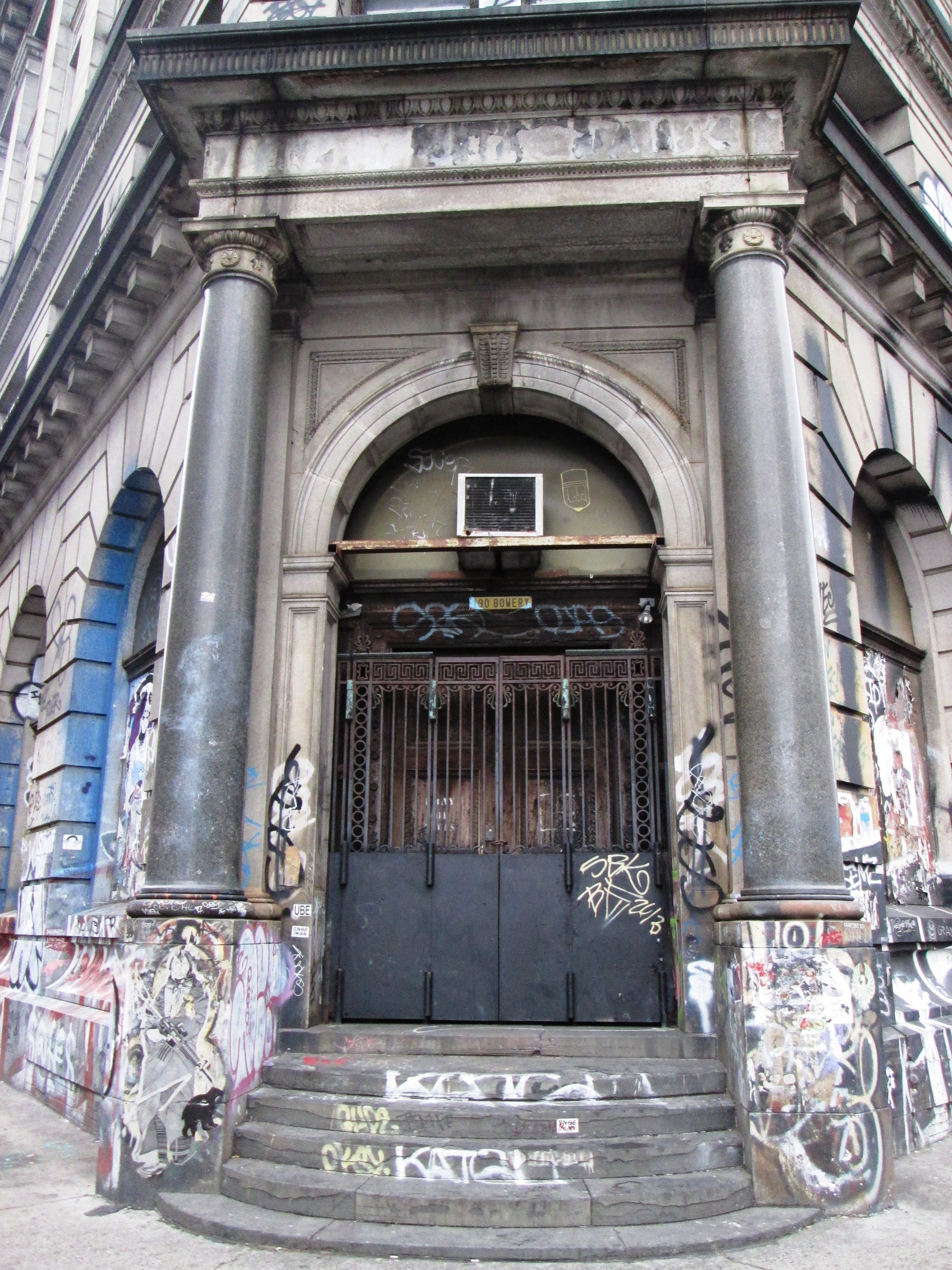
Main entrance in 2013

The Germania Bank changed its name to the Commonwealth Bank in early 1918, probably as a result of rising anti-German sentiment during World War I. In the mid-1920s, the Bowery was the location of several banks, the Commonwealth Bank being one of five between Division and Houston Streets. Starting in 1923 with the opening of a branch on Lexington Avenue, Commonwealth expanded to other parts of Manhattan and to the Bronx and Brooklyn. It was then acquired in 1927 by the Manufacturers Trust Company, which became the Manufacturers Hanover Trust Company following a 1961 merger.

Manufacturers Hanover operated 190 Bowery as a branch bank up to the mid-1960s. In 1966, it sold the building to Jay Maisel, a commercial photographer, who purchased it under the name Archival, Inc. Maisel maintained his residence, studio, and gallery there, was married there in 1989, and between 1966 and 1968 rented the second and fourth floors to artists Adolph Gottlieb and Roy Lichtenstein, respectively. The building, known locally as "The Bank", was widely thought to be abandoned. The building cost $300,000 annually to maintain, including heat and taxes. In August 2014, it was quietly put up for sale; on February 5, 2015, it was sold to Aby Rosen. Rosen tried to resell the building in 2016.

A 2019 film by Stephen Wilkes, Jay Myself, documents Maisel's move from the building after 49 years. The same year, clothing brand Supreme opened a store within 190 Bowery. By 2022, the Germania Bank Building was home to EmpireDAO, a co-working space for cryptocurrency and blockchain ventures. J. Crew hosted a pop-up shop at 190 Bowery in September 2025, and Industrious leased the office space the next month.

== See also ==
- National Register of Historic Places listings in Manhattan below 14th Street
- List of New York City Designated Landmarks in Manhattan below 14th Street
