= Stephen Wilkes =

American photographer (born 1957)

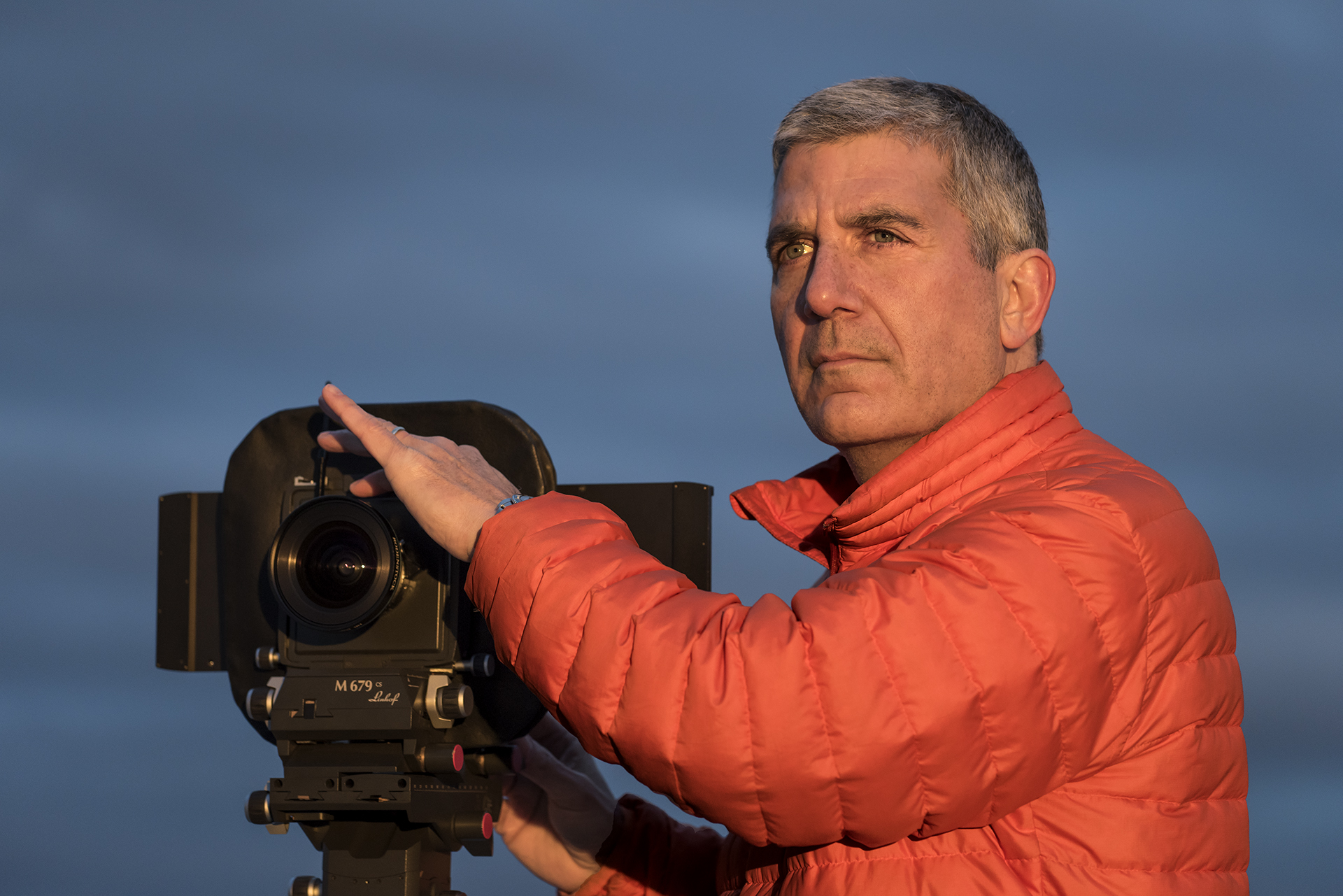
Stephen Wilkes in 2016

Stephen Wilkes (born October 28, 1957) is an American photographer, photojournalist, director and fine artist.

== Life and work ==
Wilkes was born in 1957 in New York. He received his BS in photography from Syracuse University's S.I. Newhouse School of Public Communications with a minor in business management from the Whitman School of Management in 1980. Since opening his New York studio in 1983, Stephen Wilkes has built a sizable body of work, gaining him notoriety as a photographer and wide recognition for his fine art, editorial and commercial work.

Wilkes’ early career interpretations of mainland China, California's Highway One, and impressionistic Burned Objects set the tone for a series of career-defining projects.

In 1998, a one-day assignment to the south side of Ellis Island led to a 5-year photographic study of the island's long-abandoned medical wards where immigrants were detained before they could enter America. His photographs and video helped secure donations upwards of $6 million for the restoration of the south side of Ellis Island. A monograph based on the work, Ellis Island: Ghosts of Freedom, was published in 2006 and was named one of TIME magazine's 5 Best Photography Books of the Year. The work was also featured on NPR and CBS Sunday Morning.

In 2000, Epson America commissioned Wilkes to create a millennial portrait of the United States. America In Detail— a 52-day odyssey was exhibited in New York, Chicago, Los Angeles, and San Francisco.

In 2009 he began work on the project, Day to Night. Featuring epic cityscapes and landscapes portrayed from a fixed camera angle for up to 30 hours, the work was designed to capture fleeting moments of humanity over the course of a full day. Day to Night was featured on CBS Sunday Morning as well as several other prominent media outlets and earned Wilkes a grant from the National Geographic Society, to extend the project to include America's National Parks in celebration of their centennial anniversary and Bird Migration for the 2018 Year of the Bird. This was followed by an additional grant from the National Geographic Society allowing Wilkes to extend the series yet again with Day to Night of Canadian Iconic Species and Habitats at Risk in collaboration with The Royal Canadian Geographic Society. Day to Night: In the Field with Stephen Wilkes, a solo exhibition was exhibited at The National Geographic Museum in 2018. Day to Night was published by TASCHEN as a monograph in 2019.

Wilkes’ work documenting the ravages of Hurricanes Katrina and Sandy were intended to heighten awareness and draw attention to the realities of global climate change. He was commissioned by the Annenberg Space for Photography to revisit New Orleans in 2013 after documenting Hurricane Katrina for the World Monuments Fund. His photographs on Hurricane Sandy were exhibited in 2014 at the Annenberg Center for Photography.

Wilkes' directorial debut, the documentary film, Jay Myself, world premiered at DOCNYC in November 2018. The film is an in-depth look into the world of photographer Jay Maisel and his move out of his 35,000 sq. foot building at 190 Bowery. Oscilloscope Laboratories acquired the North American rights and the film opened at Film Forum in NYC in July 2019. Wilkes was a speaker at the TED2016: Dream Conference on his Day to Night series and he participated in the TED Countdown Summit in October 2020.

In 2017 Wilkes was commissioned by the US Embassy, Ottawa to create a Day to Night photograph of Canada's 150th anniversary of Confederation. In 2021 Wilkes, now a National Geographic Explorer, was once again commissioned by the National Geographic Society to create a Day to Night of the Biden/Harris Presidential Inauguration. The photograph was featured in National Geographic and exhibited at Bryce Wolkowitz Gallery in NYC.

In addition to his work in the worlds of fine art and photography, Wilkes has also shot numerous advertising campaigns for companies such as: Netflix, Zillow, OppenheimerFunds, Gallup, SAP, IBM, Capital One, The New Yorker, Johnson & Johnson, DHL, American Express, Nike, Sony, Verizon, IBM, AT&T, Rolex and Honda.

== Awards ==
- American Photography, Selected Winner, 2014, 2015, 2017, 2018
- PDN Award of Excellence, Advertising, 2018
- Prix Pictet, Consumption, Honorable Mention, 2015
- PDN Award of Excellence, Photojournalism, Vanity Fair 2014
- PDN Award of Excellence, Photojournalism, Sandy 2013
- PDN Award of Excellence, Fine Art, Day to Night Shanghai 2013
- Time Magazine Top 10 Photographers of 2012
- Communication Arts Photography Award of Excellence 2012, 2013
- Sony World Photography Professional Award, 2012
- Adobe Breakthrough Photography Award, 2012
- Photo District News Award of Excellence, 2011
- PX3 Prix de la Photographie Paris Fine Art Series 2nd Place & 3rd Place, Photojournalism 2010 World in Focus PDN, Portraits/Sense of Place 1st, Place, 2008
- Prix De La Photographie Paris, Honorable Mention; Human Condition, 2007
- Lucie Awards 1st. Place, Professional Photographer, Editorial, The Rise of Big Water, 2007
- Lucie Awards 1st. Place, Fine Art, Ellis Island: Ghost of Freedom Lucie Awards, 2007 American Photography, Award of Excellence, 2005, 2007, 2009, 2010, 2011, 2013, 2014
- Photo District News Award of Excellence: 2002, 2005, 2006, 2008, 2009, 2010
- Graphis, 1992
- The Art Directors Club Distinctive Merit, 1992
- Communication Arts Award of Excellence 2000, 2001, 2002, 2004, 2006, 2007, 2008, 2010
- Epson Creativity Award, 2004
- Lucie Award Fine Art Photographer of the Year, 2004
- Adweek Magazine Photographer of the Year, 1992
- Alfred Eisenstaedt Award for Magazine Photography, 2000

== Solo exhibitions museums ==
- Day to Night, The Erarta Museum of Contemporary Art, St. Petersburg, Russia, January 2023
- Day to Night, Florida Museum of Photographic Arts, September, 2019
- Bird Migration, National Museum of Wildlife Art of The United States, May, 2019
- Day to Night: In the Field with Stephen Wilkes, National Geographic Museum, Washington, DC 2018
- Connecticut Responds & Reflects: 9/11, Fairfield Museum, Fairfield, CT, September 2011
- Ellis Island, Ghosts of Freedom, James A. Michener Art Museum, Doylestown, PA, June 2010
- Stephen Wilkes, Ellis Island, Griffin Museum of Photography, Winchester, MA, January 2008
- In Katrina’s Wake, World Monuments Fund Gallery, New York, NY, 2006

== Solo Gallery Exhibitions ==
- Stephen Wilkes, 'New York : From Vivaldi to Monet', Galerie GADCOLLECTION-Paris, Nov -Dec 2026
- Stephen Wilkes, 'Ellis Island - Land of Hopes and Dreams', Galerie GADCOLLECTION - Paris, March - May 2022
- Stephen Wilkes, 'A Journey', Galerie GADCOLLECTION - Paris, Dec 2018 - Jan 2019
- Stephen Wilkes, 'Day to Night series', Galerie GADCOLLECTION - Paris, Oct - Nov 2017
- Stephen Wilkes, A Witness to Change, Jackson Fine Arts, Atlanta, May, 2020
- Stephen Wilkes: Day to Night, Monroe Gallery, Santa Fe, NM, October __, 2019
- Stephen Wilkes: Day to Night, Fahey Klein Gallery, Los Angeles, October 2019
- Stephen Wilkes: A Witness to Change, Bryce Wolkowitz, September, 2019
- Day to Night: Holden Luntz Gallery, Palm Beach, Florida, January, 2019
- Day to Night: ProjectB Gallery, Milan, Italy, November, 2018
- Day to Night, Galerie GADCOLLECTION, Paris, France, October 2017
- Day to Night, Bryce Wolkowitz Gallery, New York, NY, September 2017
- Ellis Island Ghosts of Freedom, Peter Fetterman Gallery, Santa Monica, Ca. March 2017
- Day to Night, Robert Klein Gallery, Boston, MA. August 2016
- Day to Night, Bryce Wolkowitz Gallery, New York, NY, November 2015
- Remnants, Monroe Gallery of Photography, Santa Fe, NM, 2015
- Day to Night, Peter Fetterman Gallery, Santa Monica, CA, September 2014
- Bethlehem Steel, ArtsQuest Center at SteelStacks, PA 2013
- Day to Night, Monroe Gallery of Photography, Santa Fe, NM, April 2012
- Connecticut Responds & Reflects: 9/11, Fairfield Museum, Fairfield, CT, September 2011
- Day to Night, Clampart Gallery, New York, NY, September 2011
- Steuben Glass Gallery, Ellis Island, New York, NY, November 2009
- Monroe Gallery of Photography, China, Santa Fe, NM, October 2008
- Fairfield Museum, Images, Fairfield, CT, April 2009
- The Construction of the Olympic Stadium and other Chinese Public Works, ClampArt, New York, NY, June 2008
- China, David Gallery, Los Angeles, CA, January 2008
- Stephen Wilkes, Ellis Island, Chicago Cultural Arts, Chicago, IL, July 2008
- Stephen Wilkes, Ellis Island, Griffin Museum of Photography, Winchester, MA, January 2008
- Stephen Wilkes, China, ClampArt, New York, NY, April 2007
- Stephen Wilkes, Ellis Island, ClampArt, New York, NY, April 2007
- Ellis Island Revisited, Monroe Gallery of Photography, Santa Fe, NM, 2006
- Ellis Island Revisited, David Gallery, Los Angeles, CA, 2006
- Bethlehem Steel, Monroe Gallery of Photography, Santa Fe, NM, 2005
- Bethlehem Steel, Apex Fine Art, Los Angeles, CA, 2004
- Ellis Island, Monroe Gallery of Photography, Santa Fe, NM, 2004
- Ellis Island, Apex Fine Art, Los Angeles, CA, 2003
- The Female Form on the Lava Beds of Hawaii, Soho Triad Fine Arts, New York, NY, 2002 Ellis Island, Soho Triad Fine Arts, New York, NY, 2001
- America in Detail, Chicago, New York, Los Angeles and San Francisco, 2000

== Group Museum Exhibitions ==
- Who Shot Sports: A photographic History, 1843–Present, Brooklyn Museum, NY, 2017
- Arts in Embassies: Ottawa, Canada, 2015
- Annenberg Space for Photography, Sink or Swim, Designing for a Sea of Change, December, 2014
- Museum of the City of New York, Rising Waters, Photographs of Hurricane Sandy, 2013–2014
- George Eastman House: The Art of Persuasion, Rochester, NY, 1992

== Collections ==
- The Erarta Museum of Contemporary Art, St. Petersburg, Russia George Eastman House International Museum of Film and Photography Dow Jones Collection
- The Museum of Fine Arts, Houston
- Library of Congress
- Carl and Marilynn Thoma Art Foundation
- Griffin Museum of Photography
- Jewish Museum New York
- Barclays Bank Corporate Collection
- James A. Michener Art Museum
- The Historic New Orleans Collection
- Museum of the City of New York
- Snite Museum of Art
- 9/11 Memorial & Museum
- New Mexico Arts Division, Department of Cultural Affairs
