= Poser (film) =

- Theatrical release poster
- Directed by: Ori Segev; Noah Dixon
- Screenplay by: Noah Dixon
- Produced by: Drew Johnson; Juli Sasaki; Brett Reiter; Josh Nowak
- Starring: Sylvie Mix; Bobbi Kitten; Abdul Seidu; Rachel Keefe; Z-Wolf
- Cinematography: Logan Floyd
- Edited by: Noah Dixon; Ori Segev
- Music by: Adam Rob; Shawn Sutta
- Production company: Loose Films
- Distributed by: Oscilloscope Laboratories
- Release dates: June 9, 2021 (Tribeca); June 3, 2022 (United States)
- Running time: 87 minutes
- Country: United States
- Language: English
- Box office: $42,179

Poser is a 2021 American drama film directed by Noah Dixon and Ori Segev and starring Sylvie Mix and Bobbi Kitten.

== Cast ==
- Sylvie Mix as Lennon Gates
- Bobbi Kitten as Herself

== Release ==
The film premiered at the Tribeca Film Festival on June 9, 2021. In September 2021, it was announced that Oscilloscope acquired North American distribution rights to the film.

The film was released theatrically in Columbus, Ohio on June 3, 2022 and in New York City and Los Angeles on June 17, 2022.

== Reception ==
=== Box office ===
In the United States and Canada, the film earned an estimated $15,250 from one theater in its opening weekend.

=== Critical response ===
The film has a 92% rating on Rotten Tomatoes based on 25 reviews.

Kate Erbland of IndieWire graded the film a B and described it as "Spiky, funny, feverish, and more than a little nail-biting..." Tomris Laffly of Variety gave the film a positive review, writing that "the whole thing is oddly beautiful, absurdly compelling and even freakishly watchable."
