= Pulp: A Film About Life, Death & Supermarkets =

- Poster
- Directed by: Florian Habicht
- Written by: Florian Habicht; Peter O'Donoghue
- Produced by: Alex Boden
- Starring: Pulp
- Cinematography: Maria Ines Manchego
- Edited by: Peter O'Donoghue
- Production company: Pistachio Pictures
- Distributed by: Oscilloscope Laboratories
- Release date: June 6, 2014
- Running time: 90 minutes
- Country: United Kingdom
- Language: English

Pulp: A Film About Life, Death & Supermarkets is a 2014 British documentary about the rock band Pulp. It was directed by Florian Habicht.

== Participants ==
- Jarvis Cocker
- Nick Banks
- Candida Doyle
- Richard Hawley
- Steve Mackey
- Mark Webber
- Leo Abrahams

== Release ==
In April 2014, it was announced that the American distribution rights to the film were acquired by Oscilloscope Laboratories. The film was released in theaters in the United Kingdom on June 6, 2014. It was also released in select theaters in the United States on November 19, 2014.

== Reception ==
The film has an 85% rating on Rotten Tomatoes based on 34 reviews. Simon Abrams of RogerEbert.com awarded the film two stars out of four. Drew Hunt of Slant Magazine awarded the film two stars out of four.

Judy Berman of Flavorwire gave the film a positive review and wrote, "Whatever the reason, this truly is a film about life, death, and supermarkets, which means it’s a far better film about Pulp than any mere record of their final concert would have been."

Melissa Weller of Paste also gave the film a positive review and wrote, "It’s the miraculous in the mundane, and the celebration of a united kingdom of common people."

Mark Jenkins of NPR also gave the film a positive review and wrote, "The abbreviated history may mystify people who don't already know the basics. But the film does offer a vivid portrait of Cocker — wit, unlikely casanova and quite possibly hypochondriac — and an intriguing if glancing one of Doyle."

Stephen Dalton of The Hollywood Reporter also gave the film a positive review, calling it "A witty, warmhearted, imaginative documentary about the British rock band Pulp’s farewell hometown show."

Charles Gant of Variety also gave the film a positive review and wrote, "The appealing essence of the titular Britpop band is explored in “Pulp,” an artfully witty documentary that captures the “Common People” stars as they reunite for one final concert in their hometown of Sheffield, northern England, in December 2012."

Mayer Nissim of Digital Spy also gave the film a positive review and wrote, "By not foolishly trying to tell The Whole Story, Habicht has done so much more."
