= Jay Myself =

- Poster
- Directed by: Stephen Wilkes
- Written by: Josh Alexander
- Produced by: Henry Jacobson; Emma Tammi; Bette Wilkes
- Starring: Jay Maisel
- Cinematography: Stephen Wilkes; Jason Greene
- Edited by: Armando Croda; Daniel Haworth
- Music by: Joel Goodman
- Production companies: Mind Hive Films; Crooked Mile
- Distributed by: Oscilloscope
- Release date: November 11, 2018 (Doc NYC)
- Running time: 78 minutes
- Country: United States
- Language: English
- Box office: $151,331

Jay Myself is a 2018 American documentary film directed by Stephen Wilkes, produced by his wife, Bette Wilkes, and written by Josh Alexander.

== Synopsis ==
The film chronicles the days during which photographer Jay Maisel decides to sell his long-time New York home, the historic six-story former Germania Bank Building on the Bowery, for $55 million. The documentary tells the story of how Maisel obtained this property in 1967. The film starts with Maisel having only five months left until his building will be sold. During these months he is sorting through 72 rooms, showcasing a collection of VHS tapes, special-sized screws, and the photographs for which he was famous.

== Cast ==
- Jay Maisel as himself
- Stephen Wilkes as himself
- Amanda Maisel as herself
- Linda Maisel as herself

== Production and screening ==
The production began with Wilkes, back then a photographer himself, getting acquainted with Maisel in 1979, and soon after becoming his close friend, assistant and mentee. The film was shot in 2015.

Jay Myself premiered at 2018 Doc NYC. It was screened at numerous other film festivals, including the Atlanta Jewish Film Festival, the Cleveland International Film Festival, the Newport Beach Film Festival and OTR Film Festival. It also was screened domestically at the 2019 Milwaukee and at the Sedona Film Festivals.

== Reception ==
On review aggregator website Rotten Tomatoes, the film has an 89% approval rating based on 18 reviews, with an average ranking of 7.7/10. On Metacritic, Jay Myself have a rank of 74 out of a 100 based on 8 critics, indicating "generally favorable" reviews.

John DeFore of The Hollywood Reporter called Jay Myself "A fascinating look at an artist's life", while Glenn Kenny of The New York Times stated simply "It's a fun journey".

Variety's Owen Gleiberman praised the narration, writing "Wilke[s] views his old mentor with affection, but with a supreme awareness of what a crazy-charismatic crank he can be".

Nick Allen of RogerEbert.com had a different opinion. He wrote: "Whether this is all for the sake of art or not, it can be too nauseating to peer into from the outside".

According to Derek Smith of Slant Magazine, "Jay Maisel's former home suggests a bastion of creativity in a neighborhood whose rough edges have been completely sanded down".

Leah Pickett of Chicago Reader wrote in her closing comments that "[i]n the end, the viewer might find herself both feeling the loss at the center of Maisel and Wilkes's letting-go process and craving a similar grotto of her own".
