= Rubbings from a Live Man =

- Directed by: Florian Habicht
- Produced by: Florian Habicht; Philippa Campbell
- Starring: Warwick Broadhead
- Cinematography: Christopher Pryor
- Edited by: Florian Habicht; Christopher Pryor
- Music by: Marc Chesterman
- Release date: July 20, 2008
- Running time: 65 minutes
- Country: New Zealand
- Language: English

Rubbings from a Live Man is a 2008 New Zealand documentary film about performing artist Warwick Broadhead. It featured him performing and talking about his life. It was the first time he allowed his performances to be recorded.

== Reception ==
The Press's James Croot gave the film 3 stars, writing, "it affords Broadhead the opportunity to re-enact the high and low points of his life through alter-egos and vignettes." His review concludes, "Rubbings' obtuseness is destined to divide audiences."

== Awards ==
2008 Qantas Film and Television Awards

- Best Picture – Budget under $1 Million - Philippa Campbell & Florian Habicht - nominated
- Outstanding Technical Contribution in Film - budget under $1 million - Christopher Pryor (Director of Photography) - nominated
