= Hazardous Substances and New Organisms Act 1996 =

Act of Parliament in New Zealand

New Zealand Parliament
- Long title: Hazardous Substances and New Organisms Act 1996
- Passed: 1996
- Royal assent: 10 June 1996

Related legislation
- Hazardous Substances and New Organisms (Genetically Modified Organisms) Amendment Act 2002 Hazardous Substances and New Organisms (Approvals and Enforcement) Amendment Act 2005 Hazardous Substances and New Organisms Amendment Act 2010
- Status: Current legislation

The Hazardous Substances and New Organisms Act (HSNO) is an Act of Parliament passed in New Zealand in 1996. The New Zealand Environmental Protection Authority (EPA) administers the Act.

== History ==
Before 1996, the management of hazardous substances and new organisms in New Zealand was spread across several separate statutes: the Explosives Act 1957, the Dangerous Goods Act 1974, the Toxic Substances Act 1979, the Pesticides Act 1979, and parts of the Animals Act 1967 and Plants Act 1970 covering the deliberate introduction of new species. The HSNO Act consolidated these into a single approvals-based regime under one administering authority.

The Act received royal assent on 10 June 1996 but was brought into force in stages: provisions relating to new organisms took effect in July 1998, and provisions relating to hazardous substances did not take effect until July 2001. Administration of the Act was initially vested in the Environmental Risk Management Authority (ERMA), a Crown entity created by the Act.

== Purpose and principles ==
Part 2 of the Act sets out its purpose and the principles decision-makers must apply. Section 4 states that the Act's purpose is to protect the environment and the health and safety of people and communities by preventing or managing the adverse effects of hazardous substances and new organisms. Section 5 lists principles relevant to that purpose, including safeguarding the environment's life-supporting capacity and providing for the reasonably foreseeable needs of future generations. Section 6 sets out further matters decision-makers must have regard to, section 7 requires a precautionary approach where scientific information is uncertain or incomplete, and section 8 requires all persons exercising functions under the Act to take into account the principles of the Treaty of Waitangi / Te Tiriti o Waitangi.

These Treaty provisions were strengthened following a 2001 recommendation of the Royal Commission on Genetic Modification (see Controversies below), implemented through the 2003 amendments described in the next section.

== Structure and content ==
The Act operates two linked approval-based regimes: one for hazardous substances, and one for new organisms, set out together in Part 5 ("Assessment of hazardous substances and new organisms"). Under both regimes, no hazardous substance or new organism may be imported, manufactured, developed, field-tested, or released in New Zealand without prior approval, and approvals can carry conditions and controls on use.

For hazardous substances, New Zealand introduced a hazard-classification system loosely aligned with United Nations dangerous-goods and hazard-classification approaches from 2001, extended it to cover all hazardous chemicals from July 2006, and then replaced the HSNO-specific classification system entirely with the seventh revision of the UN Globally Harmonised System of Classification and Labelling of Chemicals (GHS 7) from 30 April 2021, with a four-year transition period for existing approvals to update labelling and safety data sheets.

For new organisms, the Act distinguishes between organisms held in containment, those given conditional release, and those granted full release, and separately regulates genetically modified organisms (GMOs) within each category. The Act's definition of "organism" does not include a human being, but includes a human cell such as an ovum, which is a part of the definition that has been a matter of contention.

The Act was administered by the Environmental Risk Management Authority (ERMA) from 1996 until the Environmental Protection Authority Act 2011 disestablished ERMA and transferred its functions and decision-making role to the newly created Environmental Protection Authority (EPA). Section 24A of the HSNO Act, inserted in 2003, established Ngā Kaihautū Tikanga Taiao as a standing Māori advisory committee; this section was repealed from the HSNO Act in 2011 and re-enacted without substantive change in the Environmental Protection Authority Act 2011, under which the committee continues to advise the EPA today.

== Amendments ==
In response to the ongoing debate over genetic modification, the Hazardous Substances and New Organisms (Genetically Modified Organisms) Amendment Act 2002 (2002 No 13) imposed a temporary restriction on ERMA's ability to approve the environmental release of GMOs while the Royal Commission's recommendations were worked through, with narrow exceptions for human and animal medicines and for organisms unable to persist outside containment.

The Hazardous Substances and New Organisms Amendment Act 2003 (2003 No 54), most of which came into force on 30 October 2003, then implemented the bulk of the Royal Commission's recommendations: it introduced a conditional-release approval category for new organisms, established a pecuniary-penalty and civil-liability regime for breaches involving new organisms, added provisions for the use of hazardous substances and new organisms in emergencies and for rapid assessment of agricultural compounds and medicines in special emergencies, and inserted Part 4A (sections 24A–24D) establishing the Māori advisory committee discussed under Institutions above.

Subsequent amendments have included the Hazardous Substances and New Organisms (Stockholm Convention) Amendment Act 2003 (2003 No 37), the Hazardous Substances and New Organisms (Approvals and Enforcement) Amendment Act 2005 (2005 No 123), a 2007 amendment updating container, tracking, and fireworks provisions, the Hazardous Substances and New Organisms Amendment Act 2010 (2010 No 18), and the Hazardous Substances and New Organisms Amendment Act 2015 (2015 No 72).

Two further reform processes were under way as of mid-2026:

- The Gene Technology Bill, introduced in 2024, proposes to remove gene technology and GMO regulation from the HSNO Act entirely and establish a separate, standalone regulatory regime with its own regulator within the EPA. The Gene Technology Bill 2024 proposes to remove much of the guardrails around GMOs the HSNO Act manages. The HSNO Act largely maintained New Zealand's GE free status, yet the proposed Gene Technology Bill seeks to change New Zealand GMO legislation to have one of the weakest observations of the precautionary principle in the world and as such it has faced strong opposition, with genetic engineering experts commenting that it is unscientific, New Zealand industries disagreeing on its principles, and it having general unpopularity amongst New Zealanders with 15,000 Parliamentary submissions made with the majority disapproving.
- The Hazardous Substances and New Organisms Amendment Bill (304–1), introduced in 2026, proposes to "streamline" approval pathways for hazardous substances and new organisms more broadly.

== Controversies ==
=== The Royal Commission and the GMO moratorium (2000–2003) ===
Genetic modification became one of the most contested applications of the HSNO Act soon after it came into force. A voluntary moratorium on new GMO approvals was maintained while a government-appointed Royal Commission on Genetic Modification, chaired by Thomas Eichelbaum, examined the issue; its 2001 report concluded that New Zealand should keep its options open by allowing genetic modification to proceed under caution rather than adopting an outright ban, a "proceed with caution" position that has remained the broad basis of New Zealand's approach since.

=== "Corngate" (2002) ===
The HSNO Act's approval regime became a flashpoint in the 2002 general election, when investigative journalist Nicky Hager's book Seeds of Distrust alleged that a shipment of corn seed contaminated with genetically modified material had been imported and sown without adequate disclosure; a controversy that became known as "Corngate." A televised interview between Prime Minister Helen Clark and journalist John Campbell over the allegations became one of the defining moments of that election campaign, and the episode is frequently cited as illustrative of how politically contentious GMO regulation under the Act became in New Zealand.

=== Refining the HSNO Act to account for new gene-editing technologies ===
From around 2018, some scientists and a government minister argued that the Act's approval framework designed before the development of new genomic techniques, such as the so-called, precision gene-editing technique, CRISPR-Cas, made it practically very difficult to gain approval for gene-edited organisms and left New Zealand without a clear regulatory pathway for such technologies. Others, including organic-sector and environmental groups, have argued that the Act's precautionary, case-by-case approach protects New Zealand's reputation for GMO-free agriculture and food exports, and should be preserved.
