= Environmental Risk Management Authority =

Former New Zealand government agency

The Environmental Risk Management Authority (ERMA; Māori: Ngā Kaiwhakatūpato Whakararu Taiao) was a New Zealand government agency that controlled the introduction of hazardous substances and new organisms (invasive species and genetically modified organisms). It was disestablished on 30 June 2011 and its functions taken over by the Environmental Protection Authority.

ERMA was principally responsible for implementing the Hazardous Substances and New Organisms Act 1996 (HSNO).

The aim of ERMA was stated as:

"Achieve effective prevention or management of risks to the environment, public health and safety associated with importing or manufacturing hazardous substances and introducing new organisms, and their use."

ERMA made decisions on applications under Part V of the Hazardous Substances and New Organisms Act, by evaluating risks, costs and benefits, placing conditions on approvals; and making decisions on transitional licences and other approvals. ERMA used risk management principles contained in the Methodology to guide its work.

Under the Hazardous Substances and New Organisms Act, the Authority was required to consider and weigh up the adverse and beneficial effects of a new organism or substance. The detailed decisions of the Authority also give an insight into how it has dealt with different aspects of risks, costs and benefits.

To mitigate any risks they applied controls (where relevant and possible) to the application, just as in everyday life we wear seatbelts to reduce the risks associated with driving. The controls might include housing the organism or substance in a specially designed laboratory or they may be to wear protective equipment when handling a certain hazardous chemical.

The Authority's role was to manage risks to the environment and to public health, and they did this through their decision-making processes on applications. When ERMA received an application to import a new organism or a new substance they weighed up the adverse and beneficial effects on society, the environment, public health etc. and in many cases asked the general public to make submissions as to whether the new organism or substance should be allowed into New Zealand.

== See also ==
- Environmental management
- Richard Woods - former Chairman of ERMA
