= Habicht (disambiguation) =

Habicht is the German word for the Eurasian goshawk, accipiter gentilis. It can also refer to:

== People ==
- Habicht (surname)

== Places ==
- Habicht, mountain in the Stubai Alps in Austria

== Planes ==
- DFS Habicht, 1936 aerobatic sailplane
- Messerschmitt Me 163S "Habicht", trainer version of Me 163
- Focke-Wulf A 20 "Habicht"

== Boats ==
- de:SMS Habicht (1860), Prussian gunboat
- SMS Habicht (1879), German gunboat
- de:S69 Habicht, Albatros-Klasse speedboat of the German Navy
- de:Habicht (1953), motorboat of German Railways on the Bodensee

== Other ==
- Operation Habicht 1940 List of Axis named operations in the European Theatre: German diversionary attack on Mulhouse
- de:Simson Habicht, a motorbike
