= Jay Maisel =

American photographer (1931–2026)

- Born: January 18, 1931; New York City, U.S.
- Died: August 20, 2026 (aged 95); New York City, U.S.
- Occupation: Photographer
- Website: www.jaymaisel.com

Jay Nathan Maisel (January 18, 1931 – August 20, 2026) was an American photographer.

His awards include the Art Directors Club Hall of Fame, the Lifetime Achievement Award from the American Society of Media Photographers, and the Infinity Award from the International Center of Photography.

== Life and career ==
Maisel was born in Brooklyn, New York City, on January 18, 1931, and attended Abraham Lincoln High School where he studied under Leon Friend. He studied painting and graphic design at Manhattan's Cooper Union and at Yale University in New Haven, Connecticut, and became a photographer in 1954.

One of Maisel's most notable images is his photograph of Miles Davis that appears on the cover of Davis's album Kind of Blue (1959). In 2009, Andy Baio commissioned an image based on the original Kind of Blue album cover for the cover of a chiptune tribute album titled Kind of Bloop. Attorneys representing Maisel demanded damages and that the resulting image be removed from the chiptune album, resulting in an out-of-court settlement of $32,500 from Baio.

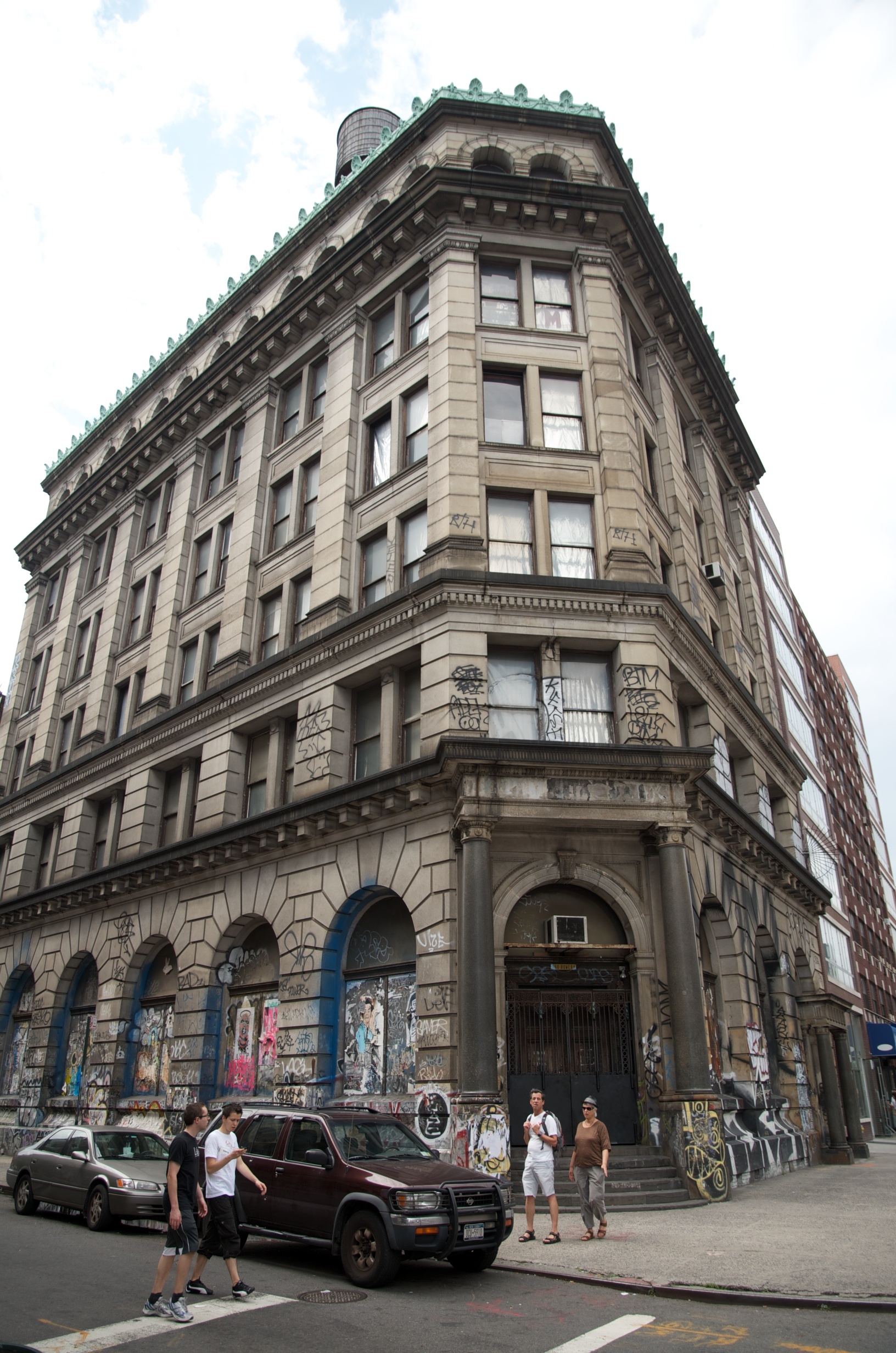
The Germania Bank Building in 2011

For almost 50 years, Maisel lived with his family in the historic Germania Bank Building on the Bowery in lower Manhattan. Built in 1898, the 35,000-square-foot (3,300 m^{2}) building contains 72 rooms over six floors. Maisel purchased the building in 1966 for $102,000 when the neighborhood was in severe decline. He used it as a single-family residence and studio. The building's value was estimated at $30 to $50 million in 2008. It cost $300,000 annually to maintain, including heat and taxes. In February 2015, the building was sold for $55 million to developer Aby Rosen. A 2019 film, Jay Myself, documents Maisel's life and his move from the building.

Maisel died in New York City on August 20, 2026 from cancer, at the age of 95.

== Awards ==
- Art Directors Club Hall of Fame
- Lifetime Achievement Award from the American Society of Media Photographers
- Infinity Award from the International Center of Photography
- In 2020 Maisel was inducted into the International Photography Hall of Fame and Museum.
