= Frank Habicht =

German-born New Zealand photographer

The cover of Habicht's book In The Sixties features a photo titled "Live it to the hilt — Renee, Westminster Bridge, 1968". This closeup portrait (somewhat unusual for Habicht) shows his eye for capturing some of the varying currents of the time. Here, Habicht, as typical with his photos, allows the young woman Renee to speak for herself, displaying an edgy and even menacing leather-biker look, knocking stereotyped sex roles for six, but yet combining in exaggerated female-signaling eye makeup common at the time. The dangling hand-rolled smoke (possibly a reefer, demonstrating the newly emergent drug culture, but even if just a cigarette, still slightly outré for women of the dominant culture) and blasé devil-may-care side-eye expression creates a general air of contumacious insouciance to the concerns, restraints, and mores of the conservative post-war British culture formed by war, depression, rationing, and antique values instilled by parents born in the previous century.

Frank Erich Habicht (9 December 1938 – 8 October 2024) was a German-born photographer, best known for his photographs of the emergent new fashions and lifestyles of the young baby boomers of "Swinging London" in the 1960s, documenting the libertarian attitudes which were expressed through fashion, design and political activism, and the class and political divides of that time and place, as the conservative postwar British culture was shouldered aside to make way for a younger generation wanting an unconstrained life with free love, peace and harmony.

== Biography ==
Born in Hamburg on 9 December 1938, Habicht attended the Hamburg School of Photography in 1962, and soon relocated to London. There, Habicht worked as a freelance photographer (for publications including Esquire, The Sunday Times, and The Guardian), still photographer for movies, and as photographer for the London Playboy Club and Top of the Pops. He took his black-and-photographs with, usually, a compact Rolleiflex. He took his photos in the street, at concerts, at rallies. Some were crowd shots, some close-ups of individuals. Most were candid photography of street denizens, but he also staged photos with models, sometimes nude (and sometimes in public places), and some of celebrities he had met in his movie and other work, such as Mick Jagger and Vanessa Redgrave.

Habicht's book Young London, Permissive Paradise was published in the late 1960s, and In the Sixties in 1997. His film still photographer work included The Virgin and the Gypsy (1970) and Mesmerized (1985), and he had a small acting role in What We Do in the Shadows (2014).

Habicht moved to New Zealand in 1981 and photographed the life and landscapes of Bay of Islands where he lived. He published the books Bay of Islands: Where the Sunday Grass is Greener (a satirical pictorial of the area) and Bay of Islands: A Paradise Found.

His "Karma Sixties" collection was exhibited in 2004 at the Colette Gallery in Paris, and other exhibitions of his photographs were at the Arterium Gallery in Moscow (2008), the Barbican Centre in London (2016), the Manchester Art Gallery (2016–2017), and the Beetles and Huxley Gallery in London.

Habicht and his wife, Christine, had two sons, including New Zealand film director Florian Habicht.

Habicht died in Kawakawa on 8 October 2024, at the age of 85.
