= Christian Habicht (actor) =

German actor (1952–2010)

Christian Habicht (24 December 1952; Bad Segeberg – 15 May 2010; Dresden) was a German actor.

== Plays ==
- Hundert Jahre Einsamkeit
- Die Sanfte
- Popcorn
- An der Arche um acht, Stück: Ulrich Hub
- Das Katzenhaus
- Nathans Kinder, Stück & Regie: Ulrich Hub
- Der Teufel mit den drei goldenen Haaren
- Hase Hasev
- Emilia Galotti, Regie: Dominik Günther
- Desaparecidos
- Die Kuh Rosmarie
- Der kleine Horrorladen
- Zement
- Faust Episode 2
- Glaube Liebe Hoffnung

== Filmography ==
- 1994: Der König – Die zwölfte Nonne
- 1995: Alles außer Mord – Hals über Kopf
- 1995: Auf Achse
- 1996: Der König – Madonna
- 2005: Hänsel und Gretel (Märchenfilm, TV)
- 2005: Familie Dr. Kleist
- 2005–2006: Sophie – Braut wider Willen
- 2006: Leipzig Homicide
- 2007: Gute Zeiten, schlechte Zeiten
