= Christian Habicht (historian) =

German historian and epigrapher (1926–2018)

- Born: February 23, 1926
- Died: August 6, 2018 (aged 92)
- Education: University of Hamburg
- Known for: Epigrapher in Ancient Greek
- Scientific career
- Fields: History

Christian Habicht (23 February 1926 – 6 August 2018) was a German historian of ancient Greece and an epigrapher in Ancient Greek.

== Biography ==
After his Promotion (PhD) at the University of Hamburg in 1952, Habicht was an assistant professor there and after his Habilitation degree in 1957 Privatdozent. In 1961, he became ordentlicher Professor at the University of Marburg and then in 1965 moved to the University of Heidelberg. In 1973, Habicht went as a faculty professor to the Institute for Advanced Study in Princeton, where he had already belonged, since the previous year, as a permanent member. At Heidelberg he remained "Honorar" professor. After 1983 he additionally taught at Princeton University as a visiting professor; he retired in 1998.

Habicht's work focused on Greek epigraphy and Athenian history in Hellenistic times. He wrote extensively on Pausanias and Cicero.

In 1982 Habicht was Sather Professor in Classics at the University of California, Berkeley. In 1991 he received the Reuchlin Prize of the city of Pforzheim, in 1996 the Moe Prize of the American Philosophical Society and in 1998 the Criticos Prize of the Society for the Promotion of Hellenic Studies in London. He is a member of the Heidelberg Academy of Sciences (since 1970), the German and Austrian Archaeological Institutes, the American Philosophical Society, the British Academy. and the Academy of Athens. Habicht was co-editor of the series of publications Hypomnemata (1962 to 1996) and the American Journal of Ancient History (1976 to 2000).

== Selected works ==
A complete bibliography of Habicht's writings up to 2002 can be found in volume 32 (2002) of the journal Chiron.

- Gottmenschentum und griechische Städte. Beck, München 1956; 2. Auflage 1970.
- Altertümer von Pergamon Bd. 8, 3. Die Inschriften des Asklepieions. de Gruyter, Berlin 1969.
- Untersuchungen zur politischen Geschichte Athens im 3. Jahrhundert v. Chr. Beck, München 1979, ISBN 3-406-04800-5.
- Studien zur Geschichte Athens in hellenistischer Zeit. Vandenhoeck und Ruprecht, Göttingen 1983, ISBN 3-525-25171-8.
- Pausanias und seine „Beschreibung Griechenlands“. Beck, München 1985, ISBN 3-406-30829-5.
- Cicero der Politiker. Beck, München 1990, ISBN 3-406-34355-4.
- Athen in hellenistischer Zeit. Gesammelte Aufsätze. Beck, München 1994, ISBN 3-406-38164-2.
- Athen. Die Geschichte der Stadt in hellenistischer Zeit. Beck, München 1995, ISBN 3-406-39758-1.
- Athens from Alexander to Antony, Harvard University Press, 1997, ISBN 9780674051119.
- The Hellenistic Monarchies: Selected Papers. University of Michigan Press 2006, ISBN 978-0-472-11109-1.
