= Florian Habicht =

New Zealand film director

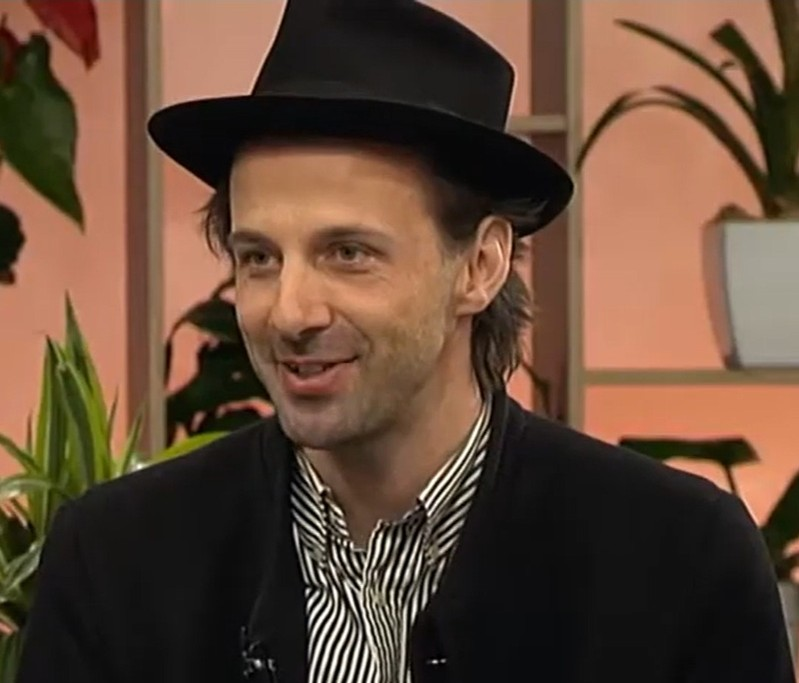
Habicht in 2017

Florian Habicht is a New Zealand film director.

== Biography ==
Habicht was born in Berlin, Germany in 1975, and moved with his family to Kerikeri in the Bay of Islands, New Zealand, when he was eight. He attended the University of Auckland's Elam School of Fine Arts. There he began to make films using his classmates as actors and collaborators. The first of these to gain recognition was Liebesträume (2000), about eccentric musician Killer Ray (Ramon Ronald Edmundson).

In 2003, Habicht made the digital feature Woodenhead, a surreal musical fairytale for which the entire soundtrack was recorded first and then the visuals were shot to match (and not match). Woodenhead was nominated in the Best Digital Feature section of the New Zealand Film and TV Awards and the film screened at a range of international festivals as well as being distributed in the US by Olive Films. His next film Kaikohe Demolition (2004) was a portrayal of Kaikohe's demolition derby, the film won Best Digital Feature at the New Zealand Screen Awards.

In 2003, Habicht attended the Binger Filmlab in Amsterdam to develop his feature script Permissive Paradise. In 2008, he completed Rubbings from a Live Man, a documentary performed by its subject, theatre practitioner and artist Warwick Broadhead. The film was produced by Philippa Campbell (Top of the Lake, Rain)

In 2009 Habicht was the recipient of the inaugural Harriet Friedlander New York Artist Residency. During his stay in New York City he filmed and performed in Love Story, which premiered at the opening night of the New Zealand International Film Festival in 2011. Love Story won Best Film, Best Director and Best editor at the New Zealand Film Awards that year. The film toured international festivals and in 2012 won the Audience Choice Award at the Pluk de Nacht Outdoor Film Festival in Amsterdam.

Jarvis Cocker saw Love Story at the London International Film Festival and his British rock group Pulp have since collaborated with Habicht and British producer Alex Boden (Cloud Atlas) on a feature documentary about Pulp and their home town Sheffield. Pulp: A Film About Life, Death & Supermarkets was released in 2014.

Habicht's father was the 1960s photographer Frank Habicht (9 December 1938 – 8 October 2024), whose work, produced mostly in London and Berlin, has recently regained critical and popular interest.

== Filmography (director) ==
- Liebesträume - The Absurd Dreams of Killer Ray (2000)
- Woodenhead (2003)
- Kaikohe Demolition (2004)
- Rubbings from a Live Man (2008)
- Land of the Long White Cloud (2009)
- Love Story (2011)
- Pulp: A Film About Life, Death & Supermarkets (2014)
- Spookers (2017)
- James & Isey (2021)
