= The Arches =

The Arches may mean:

- The Arches (Glasgow), a former theatre, arts venue and nightclub in Glasgow
- The Arches (London nightclub), a nightclub in London
- The Arches (Sheffield nightclub), a nightclub in Sheffield
- The Arches, a location in the fictional borough of Walford, in the BBC soap opera EastEnders
- The Arches Provincial Park, a public park on the western coastline of Newfoundland and Labrador, Canada
- The Arches, Norfolk Island, Australia
- A nickname for McDonald's, a fast food chain
