= Murders of Andrew Bagby and Zachary Turner =

2001 murder and 2003 child murder

Coordinates: 47.513769°N 52.995733°W

Zachary Turner
- Born: Zachary Andrew; 18 July 2002; St. John's, Newfoundland and Labrador, Canada
- Died: 18 August 2003 (aged 1); Conception Bay South, Newfoundland and Labrador, Canada
- Cause of death: Murder by drowning
- Resting place: Parson's Pond, Newfoundland and Labrador, Canada
- Other name: Zachary Andrew Bagby
- Known for: Murder victim
- Parent(s): Andrew David Bagby; Shirley Jane Turner; David Bagby; Kate Bagby

Murders of Andrew Bagby and Zachary Bagby
- Location: Murder of Bagby: Latrobe, Pennsylvania, U.S. Murder of Zachary: Conception Bay South, Newfoundland and Labrador, Canada
- Date: Murder of Bagby: 5 November 2001; 25 years ago Murder of Zachary: 18 August 2003; 23 years ago
- Attack type: Murder of Bagby: Murder by shooting Murder of Zachary: Child murder by drowning, infanticide, filicide, murder-suicide
- Weapons: Murder of Bagby: Handgun
- Deaths: 3 (including the perpetrator)
- Victims: Andrew David Bagby, aged 28; Zachary Andrew Turner, aged 1
- Perpetrator: Shirley Jane Turner
- Motive: Unknown, possibly revenge or to escape legal culpability
- Charges: Murder of Bagby: Shirley Jane Turner: First-degree murder (died before standing trial)
- Convictions: John Doucet: Professional misconduct (Note: For illegally funding Shirley Turner's bail.)

Zachary Andrew Turner (18 July 2002 – 18 August 2003) was a Canadian child from St. John's, Newfoundland and Labrador, who was killed by his mother, Shirley Jane Turner, in a murder–suicide. At the time, Shirley had been released on bail and awarded custody of the infant, even though she was in the process of being extradited to the United States to stand trial for the murder of Zachary's father, Andrew Bagby. The case led to a critical overview of Newfoundland's legal and child welfare systems as well as Canada's bail laws.

A 2006 inquiry found serious shortcomings in how the province's social services system handled the case, suggesting that the judges, prosecutors, and child welfare agencies involved were more concerned with presuming Shirley's innocence than with protecting Zachary. The inquiry concluded that Zachary's death had been preventable. The case led to the passage of Bill C-464, or "Zachary's Bill", strengthening the conditions for bail in Canadian courts in cases involving the well-being of children.

The deaths of Andrew Bagby and Zachary Turner became the basis for the 2008 documentary film Dear Zachary: A Letter to a Son About His Father, directed by Kurt Kuenne.

== Perpetrator ==
Shirley Jane Turner
- Born: 28 January 1961; St. Anthony, Newfoundland, Canada
- Died: 18 August 2003 (aged 42); Conception Bay South, Newfoundland and Labrador, Canada
- Cause of death: Suicide by drowning
- Known for: Murder-suicide of herself and her son, murder of her ex-boyfriend
- Children: 4 (1 deceased)
- Status: Deceased
- Criminal charge: First-degree murder (for the murder of Bagby)

Details
- Victims: Andrew David Bagby, (aged 28); Zachary Andrew Turner, (aged 1)
- Span of crimes: 2001–2003
- Country: United States and Canada
- States: Pennsylvania and the Province of Newfoundland and Labrador
- Killed: 2

Shirley Jane Turner (28 January 1961 – 18 August 2003) was a Canadian-American daughter of a U.S. serviceman and a local woman from St. Anthony, Newfoundland and Labrador. She was raised with three siblings in Wichita, Kansas, but moved to Newfoundland with her mother after her parents separated; the parents later divorced. In 1980, Turner enrolled at Memorial University of Newfoundland in St. John's, seeking to embark on a medical career.

=== Marriages and children ===
Upon becoming pregnant, Turner married a long-time boyfriend during Memorial University's 1981 winter recess. The child, a boy, was born on 9 July 1982. Turner's husband raised the child as a stay-at-home dad while Turner continued her studies. In 1983, Turner moved to Labrador City and worked as a science teacher. Two years later, she gave birth to a daughter. During this period, she resumed a previous relationship with a fisherman from Corner Brook.

Following the end of her first marriage on 29 January 1988, Turner married her boyfriend from Corner Brook the following July. She also had an abortion that July, but the father was not known. Turner gave birth to her second daughter on 8 March 1990, one year before she and her second husband separated. Turner completed her undergraduate education while raising her children with help from her second husband.

In October 1993, a man boarding with Turner confided to his therapist that he had witnessed Turner physically and emotionally abusing two of her children. Newfoundland social service workers interviewed the children, who stated that their "disciplinarian" mother punished them with spankings and beatings by belt. Turner's second husband claimed that she only used the belt as a threat in his interview. The case was closed on 11 January 1994 without an interview with Turner. Three years later, Turner and her second husband divorced, and she was granted custody of their daughter. Within days of the ruling, however, Turner sent her daughter back to live with her father in Portland Creek while her other two children were sent to Parson's Pond to live with their paternal grandmother.

Since 1982, Turner had taken out baby bonuses for her children from a scholarship fund, expecting to send them to college. However, in the summer of 2000, Turner confessed to a relative that she had spent the baby bonuses on her own living expenses and doctoral education. Turner insisted that she would earn "big money" after completing her post-residency training and would repay the savings for her children's post-secondary education.

=== Medical residencies ===
Turner received her undergraduate degree from Memorial University in May 1994; four years later, she earned her medical degree. Between 1998 and 2000, she served as a resident physician at teaching hospitals across Newfoundland.

During a 1999 residency at a family practice in St. John's, Turner's professionalism drew harsh criticism by her supervising physician, who stated she would become "quite hostile, yelling, crying, and accusing me of treating her unfairly." During her remedial second residency period in early 2000, Turner missed nine days of her three-month rotation and falsified clinical reports. A patient of the clinic refused to return after an encounter with Turner. The staff became "so concerned about Shirley Turner's approach to confrontation and the truth that we would never give her feedback or hold any major discussion [with her] alone." These incidents left the supervising physician with the impression that:

I felt I was being manipulated whenever I spoke with Shirley Turner. When negative items would come up[,] she would change the topic to one of my failings. She could be charming[,] friendly and lively, but when caught in an untruth, she would become angry, accusatory, and loud. I always felt Shirley Turner was putting on a show as if she were playing the role but had no feeling for her work. I cannot recall a trainee like Shirley Turner in that her approach lacked personal commitment, and her relationships with people seemed, at least to me, to be superficial when compared to the over 400 residents I have supervised during the past 21 years.

In a later interview with an assessment officer at the Office of the Child and Youth Advocate, the supervising physician, in hindsight, described Turner as "a manipulative, guiltless psychopath." The experience with Turner led that St. John's practice to make "constructive changes" in its residency evaluation process. By the summer of 2000, Turner had completed the requirements of her residency training and was qualified to practice medicine.

=== Stalking case ===
In March 1996, Turner began a relationship with a St. John's resident, Miles Doucet, who was thirteen years her junior. After Doucet broke up with Turner and moved elsewhere in Newfoundland, she began inundating him with phone calls. In November 1997, Turner confronted him in Halifax, Nova Scotia, and struck him in the jaw with her high-heeled shoe. After consulting with his parents, Doucet moved to Westtown Township, Pennsylvania, United States in 1998. Turner followed the man to Pennsylvania, leaving threatening voicemails over the following year and making unannounced visits to his apartment. On several occasions, he had summoned state troopers to order her to leave. He expressed fear to police of "what Dr. Turner would do next."

On 7 April 1999, Doucet found Turner lying semi-conscious outside of his apartment, having ingested a combined 65 milligrams of over-the-counter drugs in a suicide attempt. Turner was wearing a black dress, carried a bouquet of red roses and had two suicide notes on her. One note had been addressed to Doucet and the other to her psychiatrist; the latter read, "I am not evil, just sick." Turner was rushed to a hospital, where she received a gastric lavage. The following day Doucet received a voicemail from a female caller who stated, "Dr. Turner died last night."

== Andrew Bagby murder ==
=== Background ===
Andrew Bagby
- Born: Andrew David Bagby; September 25, 1973; Sunnyvale, California, U.S.
- Died: November 5, 2001 (aged 28); Latrobe, Pennsylvania, U.S.
- Cause of death: Murder by shooting
- Occupation: Doctor
- Known for: Murder victim
- Children: Zachary Turner (2002–2003)

Beginning in early 1999, Turner began dating Andrew David Bagby (September 25, 1973 – November 5, 2001), an American medical student studying at Memorial University for his third year. Bagby came from Sunnyvale, California, United States, and was the son and only child of Kathleen Daphne Bagby (née Barnard), a registered nurse and midwife from Chatham, Kent; and David Franklin Bagby, a United States Navy veteran and computer engineer.

In August 2000, Turner moved to Sac City, Iowa, to begin work for Trimark Physicians Corporation. Meanwhile, after graduating from Memorial University in May 2000, Bagby landed a surgical residency at the State University of New York Upstate Medical University at Syracuse, New York. Despite the distance between states, Turner and Bagby initially tried to maintain a long-distance relationship. By Turner's account, she visited Bagby's residence in Syracuse seven times while he visited her once in Sac City. During one of these visits, Turner is believed to have burglarized Bagby's apartment. In the fall of 2001, Bagby moved to Latrobe, Pennsylvania, and began his residency at a family practice under the supervision of T. Clark Simpson.

On 10 July 2001, less than a year into her ten-year contract with Trimark, Turner left their Sac City clinic and moved to Council Bluffs, Iowa, where she was hired by Alegent Health System of Omaha, Nebraska. In October 2001, Turner obtained a permit to buy a firearm and purchased a Phoenix Arms HP22 handgun and .22 ammunition, which she used during firearms lessons.

Meanwhile, Turner exhibited possessive behaviour towards Bagby and harassed him over the phone. On 13 October, Turner told Bagby that she was three months pregnant. Bagby agreed to talk with her about the pregnancy during a wedding that Bagby was scheduled to attend. When Turner visited him in Latrobe in late October 2001—immediately after the last of her firearms lessons in Omaha—the two frequently argued over his relationship with a new girlfriend. On 3 November 2001, Turner confessed that she had been lying about her pregnancy in an effort to remain with Bagby permanently. Furious about this, Bagby drove Turner to the Arnold Palmer Regional Airport and broke up with her over lunch, sending her on a plane back to Iowa.

=== Murder and investigation ===
On 4 November 2001, Turner made a total of three phone calls to Bagby's residence in Latrobe. At approximately 1:00 p.m. local time, Turner embarked on a 16-hour, 1,523-kilometre (946 mi) drive to Latrobe with her gun and ammunition inside a gun box in her Toyota RAV4. In the early morning of 5 November 2001, she confronted Bagby at his residence, located across the street from his practice. Bagby arrived at work in an "agitated" state and told Simpson about her appearance but dismissed Simpson's advice to not meet with her in private; Bagby subsequently promised to visit Simpson's house after talking to Turner that evening, but he never showed up. Turner later drove home and left a message on Bagby's answering machine.

The following morning, Bagby's body was found in a day-use parking lot at Keystone State Park in Derry Township, Pennsylvania. He had been shot five times in the face, the chest, the buttocks, and the back of the head with CCI .22 bullets. Acting on statements by Simpson and others, the Pennsylvania State Police contacted Turner. Despite her claim to have been in bed sick on 5 November, cell phone and Internet records showed that she had made cross-country calls both to and from Latrobe, accessed eBay and Hotmail from Bagby's home computer, and used his home phone to call in sick. When confronted with this evidence, Turner claimed that she met with Bagby at Keystone State Park but that he put the gun in his trunk. However, Turner told her shooting instructor that her gun had been stolen.

Investigators interviewed Turner's shooting instructor, who explained that her handgun ejected live rounds during lessons; this was consistent with an unspent round recovered near Bagby's body. Later, a Derry resident reported having seen Bagby's Toyota Corolla parked next to Turner's RAV4 ten minutes after Bagby made his last phone call to Simpson and the Corolla parked alone the following morning. The lot number on a box of condoms found in Turner's Council Bluffs apartment matched a box purchased by Bagby in Latrobe on the night of the break-up. Also in Turner's apartment were MapQuest printouts for road directions to Latrobe. Turner had fled the country by the time authorities obtained a warrant for her arrest.

== Legal proceedings ==
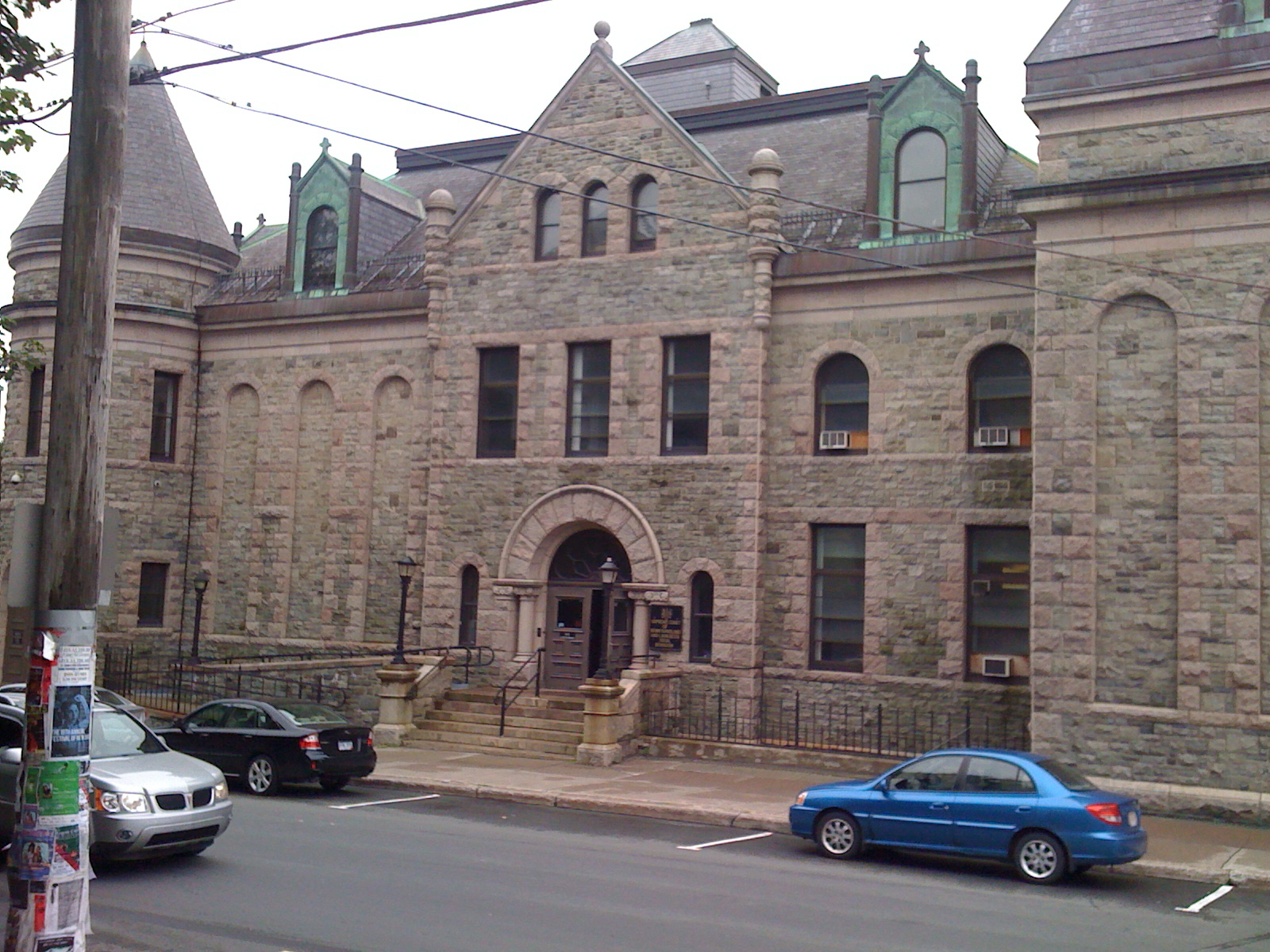
The Supreme Court of Newfoundland and Labrador, where Shirley Turner's extradition proceedings were conducted

On 12 November 2001, Turner abandoned her residence in Council Bluffs and flew to Toronto, eventually resettling in St. John's with her oldest son. Acting in collaboration with the Pennsylvania State Police, the Royal Newfoundland Constabulary's (RNC) Intelligence Unit conducted surveillance on her movements. On 2 December, the Unit seized her trash and discovered printouts for an ultrasound taken on 29 November, showing a fetus that was conceived with Bagby the previous month.

The RNC arrested Turner on 12 December, the same day extradition proceedings commenced against her. However, Newfoundland Justice Gale Welsh believed Turner, then 40, was not a threat to society, despite the murder charges awaiting her in Pennsylvania. Turner was released from Her Majesty's Penitentiary's Clarenville Correctional Centre for Women, and was required to post CAD$75,000 bail, turn in her passports, pay weekly visits to the RNC, promise not to leave the area, and make no attempt to contact Bagby's family. Turner posted bail with help from her psychiatrist, John Doucet, a former co-worker from Memorial University.

The news that Turner was pregnant with Bagby's child turned the extradition case into one involving child custody, and subsequently led to a complicated legal saga. David and Kathleen Bagby moved to St. John's, Newfoundland, in order to fight for custody of their son's child, while Turner eventually moved into her own apartment on Pleasant Street in St. John's.

=== Custody case ===
After Zachary's birth on 18 July 2002, Turner initially refused to allow David and Kathleen Bagby to see their grandson, fearing they would kidnap him. She went so far as to discharge her family law lawyer because of his positive attitude towards the Bagbys.

On several occasions, it was noted that Zachary had poor attachment to his mother and preferred the company of other adults, particularly his grandparents. This preference was made especially clear during Zachary's first birthday party at a St. John's McDonald's, after which Turner said to Kathleen, "He obviously loves you more than me, so why don't you take him?"

Turner was returned to jail in November 2002 pending a decision by the federal justice minister regarding whether she should be extradited to the United States. However, in January 2003 Justice Welsh again released her, arguing that the murder "was not directed at the public at large" and that Turner was presumed to be innocent.

== Murder–suicide ==
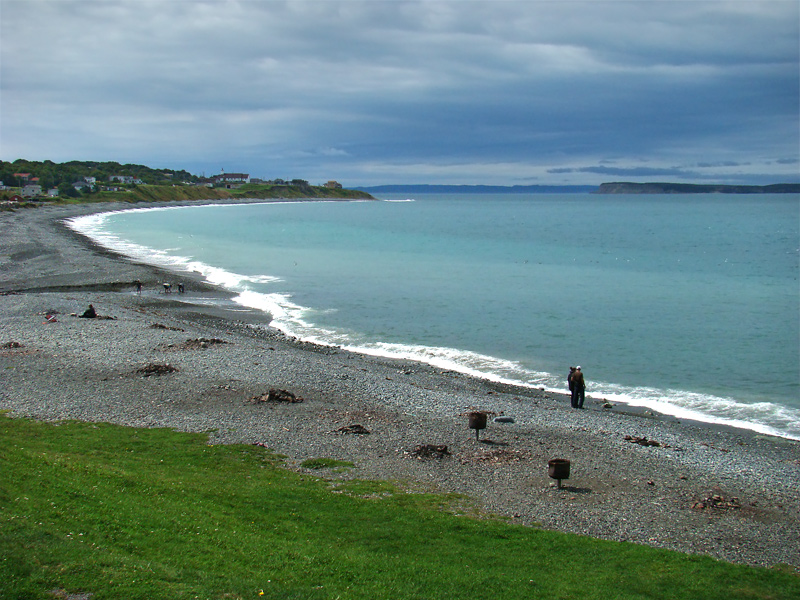
Conception Bay South, where Shirley Turner drowned herself and her son Zachary

On 18 August 2003, Zachary was scheduled to be in his mother's custody. Turner first purchased her prescription of lorazepam from a St. John's pharmacy. After mixing her lorazepam into Zachary's baby formula and ingesting a toxic dosage herself, Turner strapped the infant to her chest with her sweater and jumped off a fishing wharf at Foxtrap Marina into the Atlantic Ocean. Turner drowned. It was determined that Zachary Turner was rendered unconscious by the lorazepam and did not suffer.

Turner's body was found on a beach by a vacationing couple, with Zachary's body discovered nearby.

== Subsequent events ==
=== Investigations and findings ===
On 3 May 2006, a disciplinary board convened by the College of Physicians and Surgeons of Newfoundland and Labrador found Doucet guilty of professional misconduct for his involvement in helping to post Turner's $75,000 bail. He was ordered to pay a fine of $10,000—covering one-third of the $30,000 incurred by the college for the inquiry—and was ordered to undergo psychiatric counseling. Doucet said he was "disappointed" by the verdict, while David Bagby stated that he was happy with the precedent his case would be setting. According to filmmaker Kurt Kuenne, Doucet later left Newfoundland and relocated elsewhere in Canada.

Dr. John Doucet would pass away in 2026 in Nova Scotia.

In October 2006, Winnipeg-based coroner Peter Markesteyn released the Turner Review and Investigation, which concluded that Zachary's death was preventable and criticised Newfoundland and Labrador's social services system for failing to protect the child from his mother, stating, "Nowhere did I find any ongoing assessment of the safety needs of the children." Markesteyn specifically cited poor communication between social services officials, who worked on the presumption of Turner's innocence throughout the case and became more concerned for her welfare than for Zachary's. Markesteyn ultimately concluded that internal disagreements between caseworkers and managers weren't openly discussed and that an intervention by an outside office should have been made. The provincial Government of Newfoundland and Labrador accepted the report's conclusions and its 29 recommendations.

=== Bagbys' activism ===
On 23 October 2009, Scott Andrews, then a Liberal MP from Newfoundland and Labrador, introduced Bill C-464, or "Zachary's Bill", which would change the Criminal Code of Canada to allow the courts to justify refusing bail to those accused of serious crimes in the name of protecting their children. The bill received unanimous support in the Canadian House of Commons, and received support from Liberal Senator Tommy Banks. It was finally signed into law by Governor-General David Johnston on 16 December 2010. Andrews later said that the law "gives [the Bagbys] some sense that someone has heard their cries so this will not happen again, to change the law to make sure something this tragic will never happen again."

David Bagby penned a book about the case, Dance with the Devil: A Memoir of Murder and Loss, which was published in 2007.

=== Dear Zachary film ===
Written and directed by Kurt Kuenne, Dear Zachary: A Letter to a Son About His Father was released by MSNBC Films and Oscilloscope Laboratories on 31 October 2008. The film is partly composed of home movies Kuenne and Bagby shot together as teenagers in California, and features interviews with Bagby's parents, extended family, friends, classmates, and colleagues, both before and after Zachary's murder. A portion of the film also shows Kuenne meeting Zachary in Newfoundland in July 2003 to celebrate his first birthday, one month before his death; Shirley Turner does not at any point gain the information that Kurt is there, and at any point she might pop up, he hides for Zachary's safety. The film premiered at the Slamdance Film Festival, and was broadcast by MSNBC on 7 December 2008.

The National Board of Review of Motion Pictures named the film one of the five top documentaries of 2008. The organizations that named it one of the best films of 2008 included: Time Out Chicago, The Oregonian, the Times Herald-Record, Slant Magazine, and WGN Radio Chicago. The website Film School Rejects placed the film third in their "30 Best Films of the Decade" list. The Film Vault included the film on their list of the "Top 5 Good Movies You Never Want to See Again".

The Chicago Film Critics Association nominated Dear Zachary for its Best Documentary award, and the Society of Professional Journalists presented the film with its Sigma Delta Chi Award for Best Documentary. The film also received the Special Jury and Audience Awards at the Cinequest Film Festival, was named an Audience Favorite at Hot Docs, received the Audience Awards at the St. Louis International Film Festival and the Sidewalk Moving Picture Festival, and was named Best Documentary at the Orlando Film Festival.

=== Scholarships ===
Two scholarships have been established in tribute to Andrew David Bagby and his son. The Dr. Andrew David Bagby Family Medicine Scholarship is for medical students at Excela Health Latrobe Hospital, and almost four dozen students pursuing Bagby's speciality of family practice have benefited from the award. The Dr. Andrew Bagby and son Zachary Bursary Fund supports students at the Memorial University of Newfoundland.
