= Parson's Pond =

Parson's Pond Sandy Bay
- Town
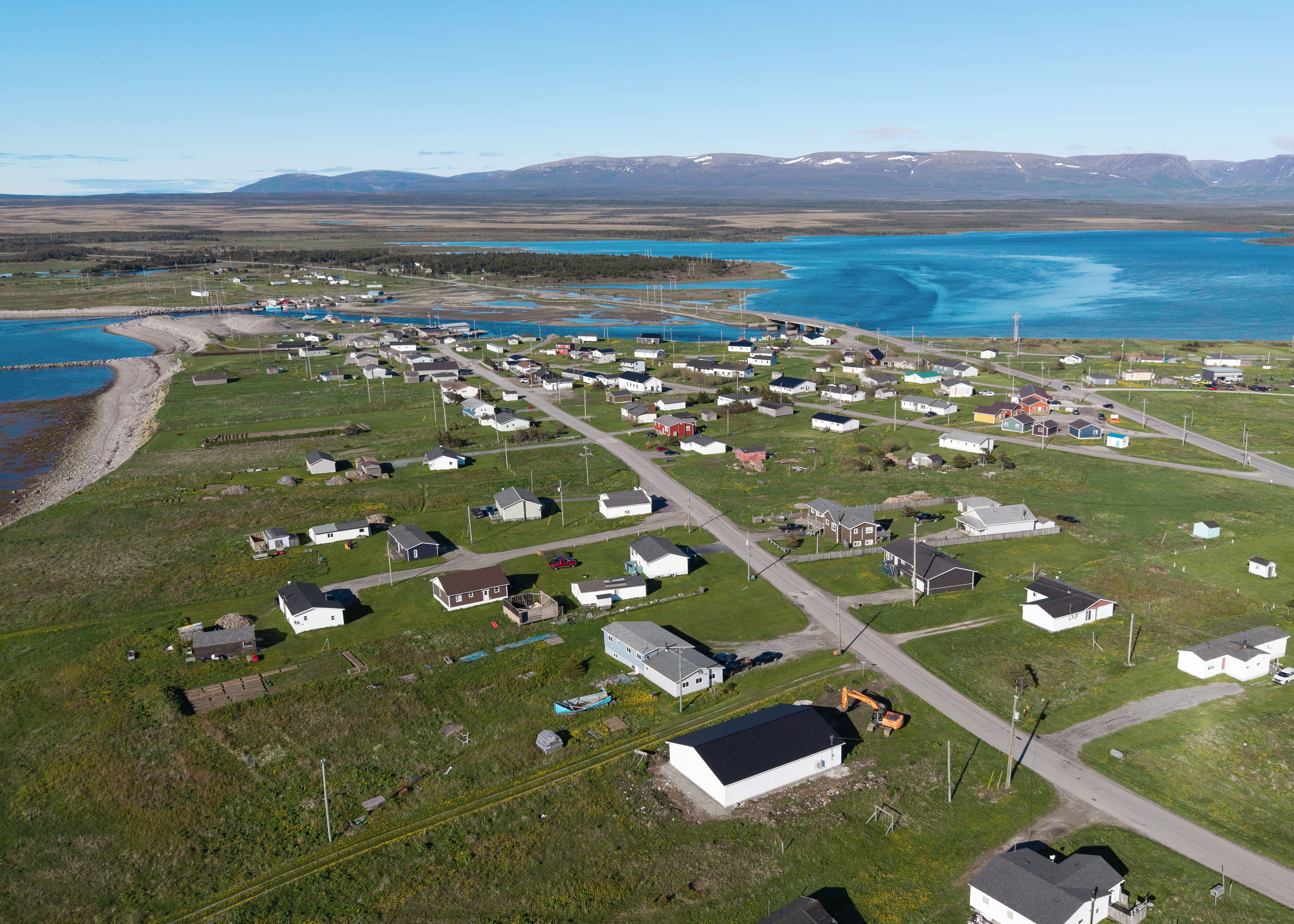
- Aerial view, 2026

- Location of Parson's Pond in Newfoundland
- Coordinates: 50°02′13″N 57°41′49″W
- Country: Canada
- Province: Newfoundland and Labrador

Population (2021)
  - Total: 368
- Time zone: UTC-3:30 (NST)
  - Summer (DST): UTC-2:30 (NDT)
- Area code: 709
- Highways: Route 430

Parson's Pond is a community in the province of Newfoundland and Labrador in Canada.

== History ==
Parson's Pond was originally called Sandy Bay. It is located on the Great Northern Peninsula. The first census was in the late 19th century and had a population of just 18, by 2001 the population was 427.

== Demographics ==
In the 2021 Census of Population conducted by Statistics Canada, Parson's Pond had a population of 368 living in 177 of its 216 total private dwellings, a change of 6.7% from its 2016 population of 345. With a land area of 12.34 km^{2} (4.76 sq mi), it had a population density of 29.8/km^{2} (77.2/sq mi) in 2021.

== Tourism ==
Parson's Pond, which has a small harbour, is on route 430 which is known as the Viking Trail. From the town there is a scenic view to Gros Morne National Park which is just 5 km to the south. The Arches Provincial Park with an interesting geological formation of limestone formed by glacial action, wind and water erosion is 10 km north of the town.

Parson's Pond is also known as the final resting place of Zachary Turner after being involved with a murder-suicide with his mother, Shirley Jane Turner.

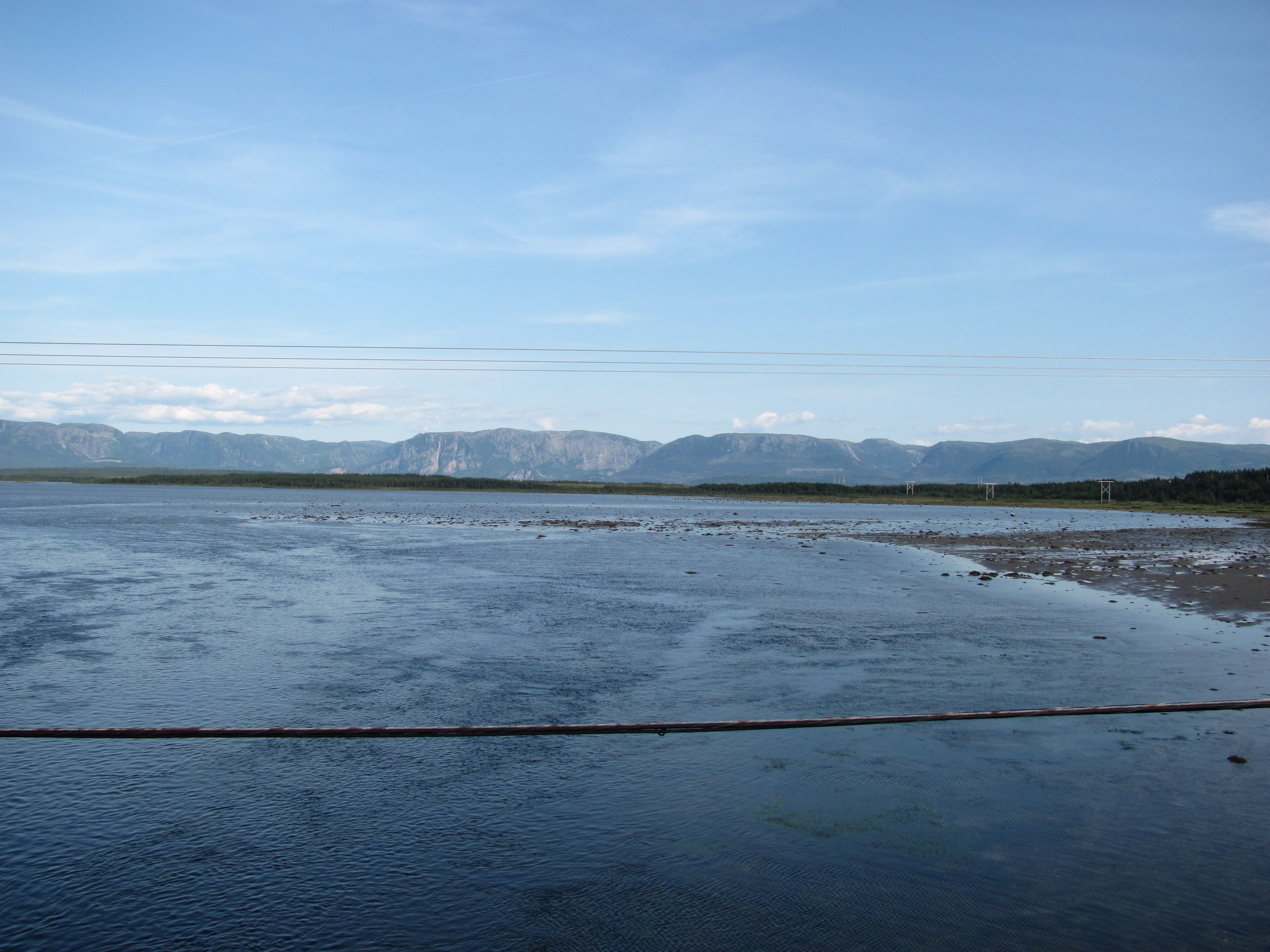
View to Gros Morne National Park

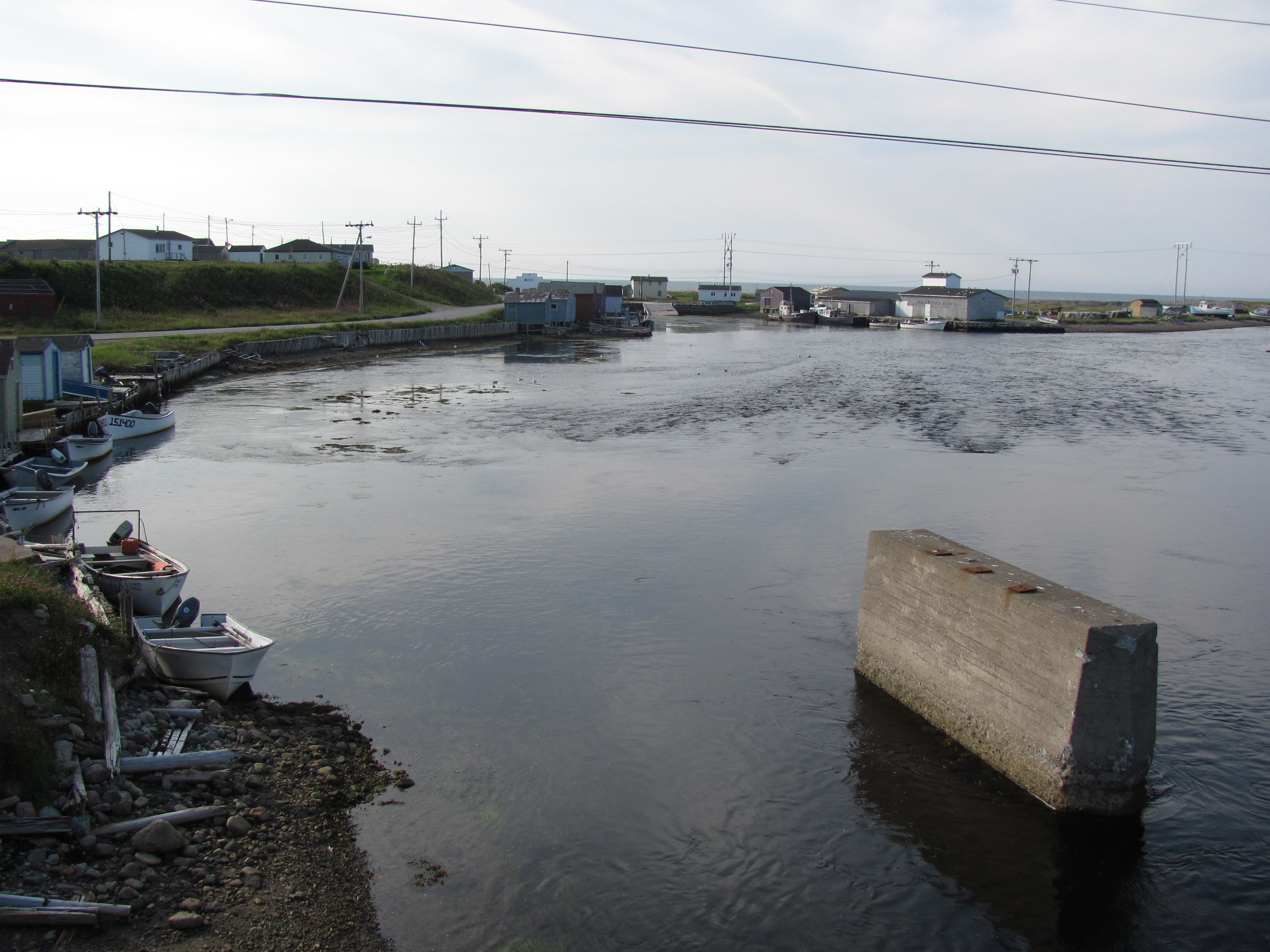
Harbour

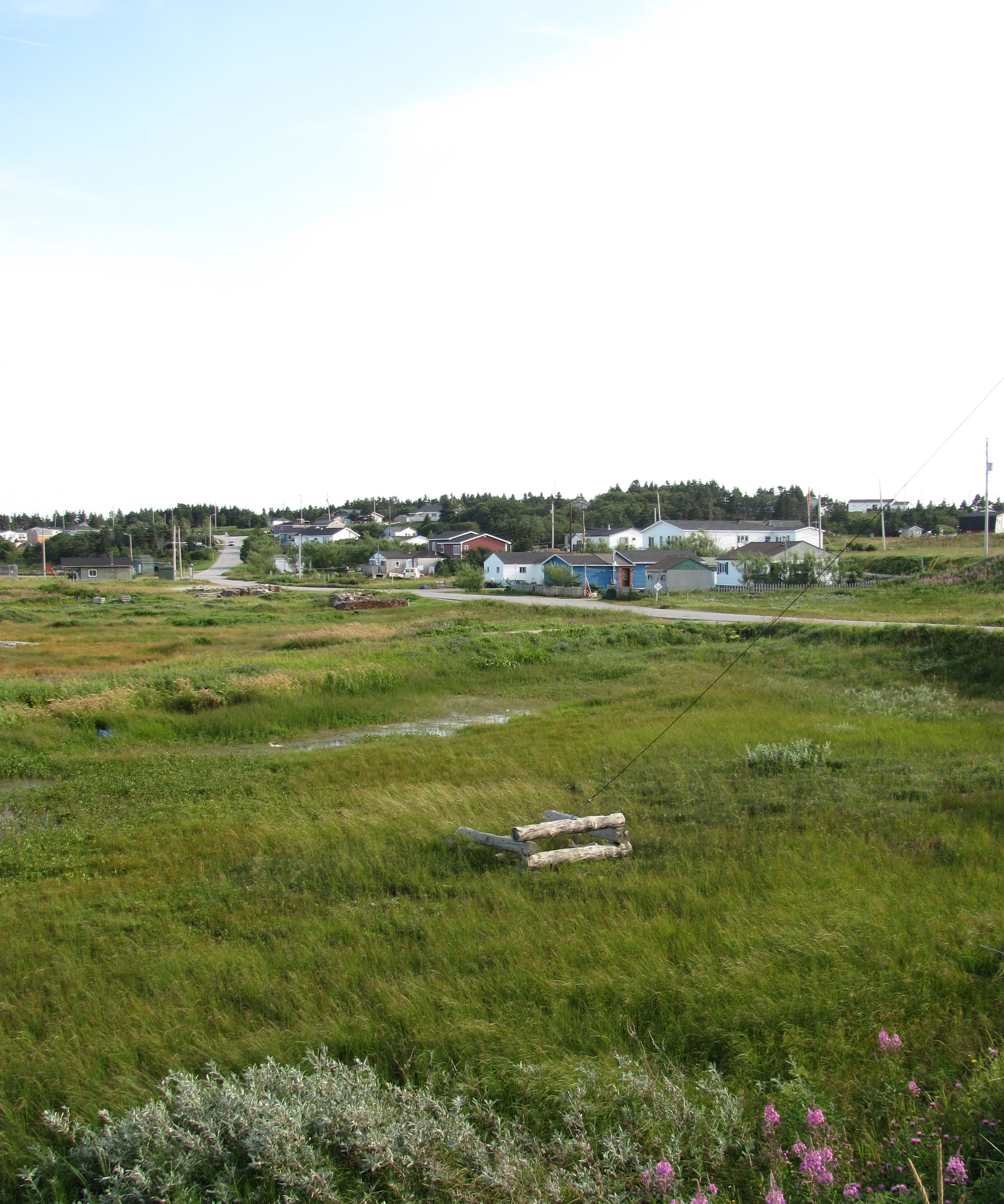
General view of Parson's Pond
