= Keystone State Park (Pennsylvania) =

State park in Westmoreland County, Pennsylvania, United States

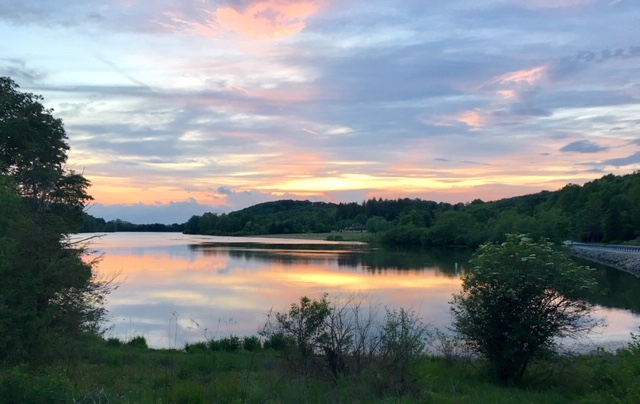

- Location within Pennsylvania Location within the United States
- Interactive map of Keystone State Park
- Location: Derry Township, Westmoreland County, Pennsylvania, United States
- Coordinates: 40°22′34″N 79°22′48″W
- Area: 1,200 acres (490 ha)
- Elevation: 1,096 feet (334 m)
- Established: 1945
- Administrator: Pennsylvania Department of Conservation and Natural Resources
- Visitors: 285,113 (in 2008)
- Website: Official website
- Pennsylvania State Parks

Keystone State Park is a 1,200-acre (486 ha) Pennsylvania state park in Derry Township, Westmoreland County, Pennsylvania in the United States. Located off U.S. Route 22 near New Alexandria, the park opened in 1945. Its main attraction is the man-made 78-acre (32 ha) Keystone Lake. The park also has extensive picnic areas and several miles of hiking trails.

== History ==
In 1909, Keystone Coal and Coke Company purchased land at the meeting of McCune and Davis runs and constructed a dam to create Keystone Lake. Water was used to wash coal extracted from the nearby Salem #1 Mine and quench coke from the coke ovens. A second mine, a drift mine called Salem #2, opened in 1938.

Even before it was a state park, Keystone Lake was used for recreation. Company executives used the lake for fishing, swimming, and boating. The company built a stone lodge for business meetings, hunting, and executives' family vacations. The lodge is now the James A. Kell Visitor Center.

In 1945, the Commonwealth of Pennsylvania acquired the lake, lodge, and surrounding land from the Keystone Coal and Coke Company to create Keystone State Park. The Salem #2 Mine operated until 1953 and its surrounding land was later acquired by the park.

Abandoned mine tunnels lie beneath Hillside Campground and the cabin area. A mine entrance, now sealed, is located east of Pavilion #2 and north of the cabin entrance road.

== Recreation ==
=== Camping ===
Keystone State Park is open to camping from the first Friday in April to the third Sunday of October. There are two campgrounds. Lakeside Campground is on the shores of Keystone Lake. It has 40 campsites for tents or campers. Hillside Campground is in a more remote part of the park. It has 60 campsites, also for tents or campers. Each campground has some sites with an electric hook-up, a modern bathhouse and a sanitary dump station.

=== Lodging ===
There are several overnight lodging options at Keystone State Park. Eleven modern cabins are located near the dam and between the campgrounds. Each cabin can sleep up to six guests in two bedrooms. The cabins are equipped with a modern bathroom, a kitchen with a stove, microwave and refrigerator. The yard areas have picnic tables, grills and fire rings.

There are three camping cottages located in Lakeside Campground, which sleep five guests in bunk beds. One cottage is ADA accessible. The cottages have a porch, electricity, a fire ring, and a picnic table, but no indoor kitchen or plumbing.

There are two yurts made located in Lakeside Campground, which sleep five guests in bunk beds. One yurt is ADA accessible. The yurts are round structures made of canvas and wood-walled tents and feature a wooden deck. The yurts have electricity, a cooking stove, microwave oven, refrigerator, fire ring, and picnic table. There is no indoor plumbing but both yurts are adjacent to a water pump.

=== Hiking ===
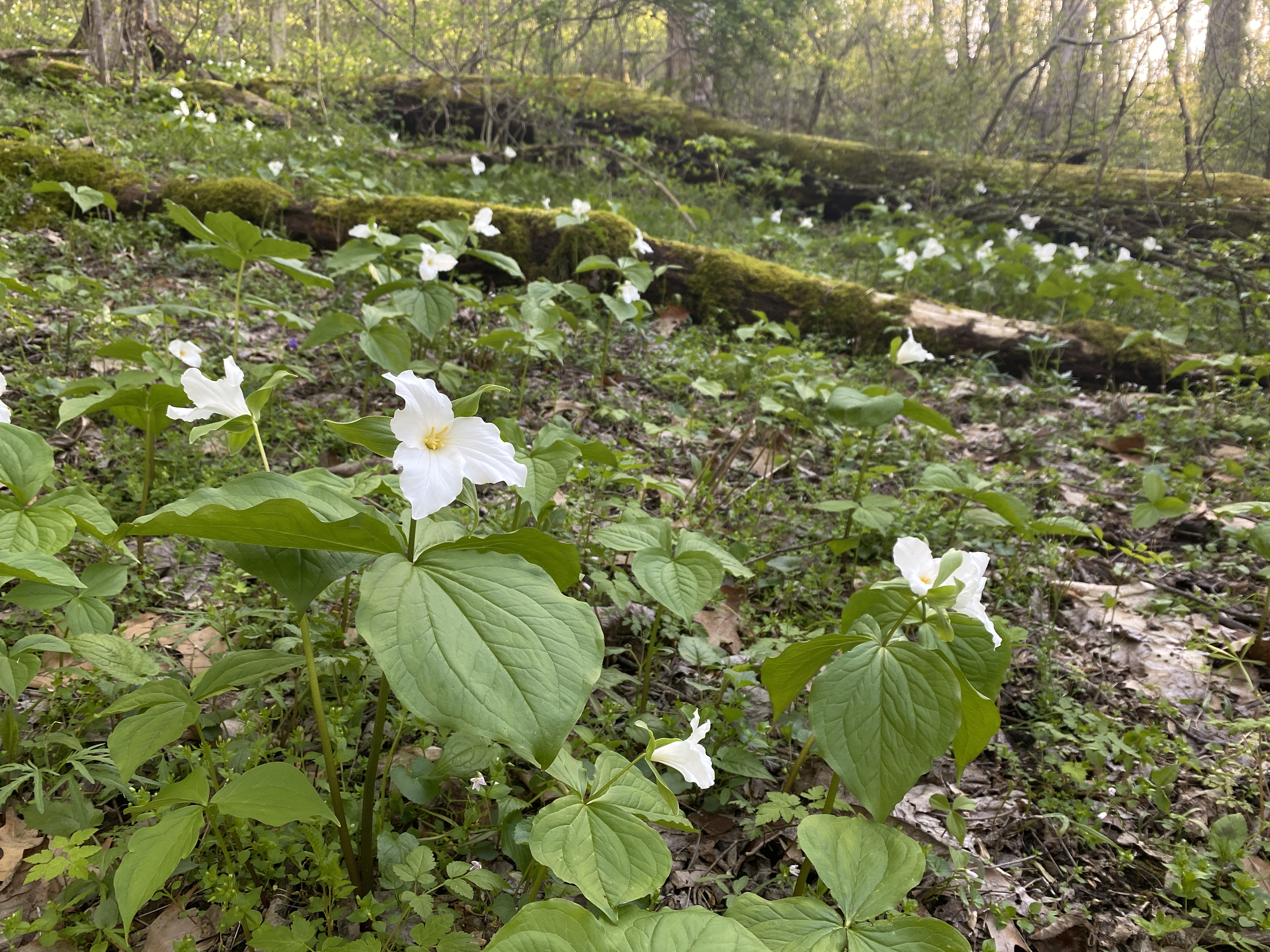
Large white trillium (Trillium grandiflorum) along Stone Lodge Trail

Keystone State Park maintains 8 miles of trails that are open year-round.

- Lakeside Loop is a 2.0 mile (3.2 km) path that encircles the lake and passes through various ecosystems. This path ADA accessible and ideal for families.
- Pine Trail is a 0.3 mile (0.48 km) trail that branches off the Lakeside Loop. It features red, white, and table mountain pine trees and views of farm fields and chestnut oak trees.
- Stone Lodge Trail is a 1.8 mile (2.9 km) trail that begins at the James A. Kell Visitor Center parking lot and climbs up the steep, forested hillside, making this the most difficult trail at the park. Remnants of an old homestead and springhouse are located in the forest. Spring ephemeral wildflowers bloom in abundance along this trail before leaves emerge on the trees.
- Davis Run Trail is a 1.25 mile (2.0 km) more difficult hiking trail that passes through wetlands and an upland forest.
- McCune Run Trail is a 1.8 mile (2.9 km) more difficult hiking trail that connects with Strawcutter and Davis Run trails.
- Strawcutter Trail is 2.0 miles (3.2 km) and passes through wetland, meadow, and pine forest. It is an easier trail with native wildflowers and butterflies in the summer. It connects with McCune Run and Davis Run Trails.

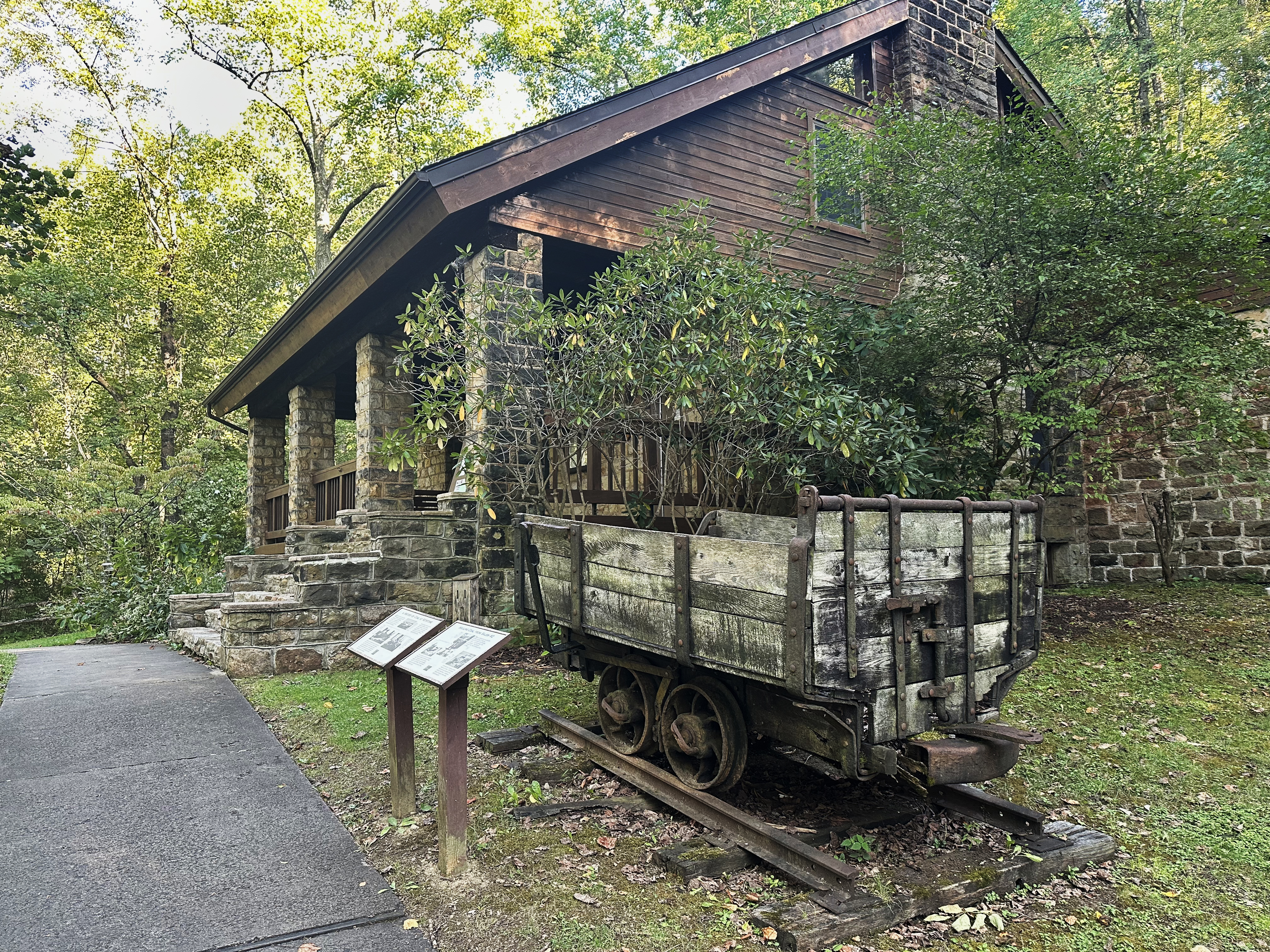
James A. Kell Visitor Center (the former coal company lodge) and a historic coal wagon

=== Hunting ===
Hunting is permitted on about half of Keystone State Park. The most common game species are eastern cottontail rabbits, common pheasant, eastern gray squirrels, wild turkey, ruffed grouse and white-tailed deer. The hunting of groundhogs is prohibited. Hunters are expected to follow the rules and regulations of the Pennsylvania Game Commission.

=== James A. Kell Visitor Center ===
The James A. Kell Visitor Center, located in the former lodge of the Keystone Coal and Coke Company, houses mining artifacts and natural history exhibits.

== Lake ==
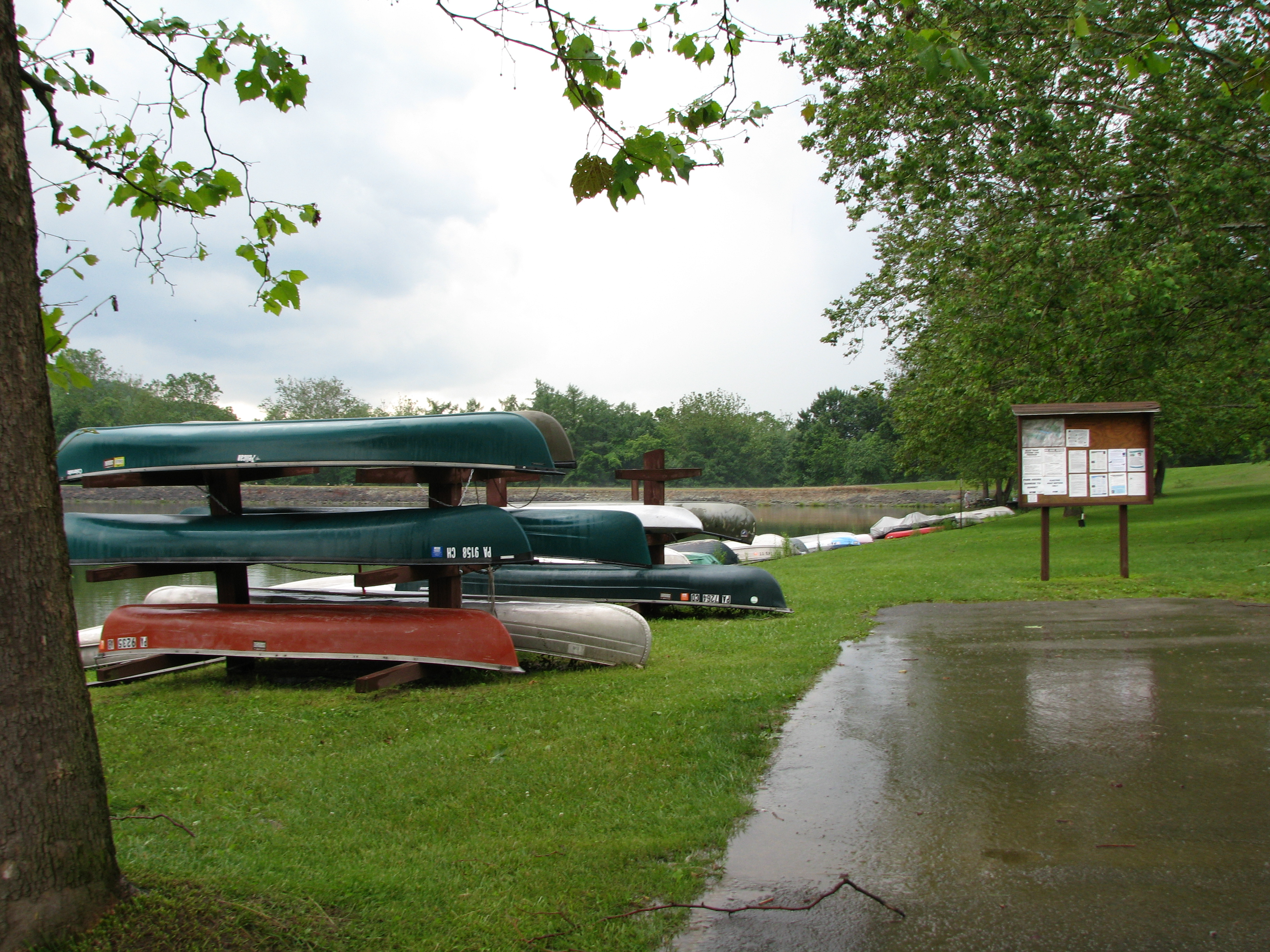
The park is a popular canoeing location.

=== Fishing ===
Keystone Lake provides a habitat for both warm and cold water species of fish. The common game fish in Keystone Lake are carp, northern pike, tiger muskellunge, largemouth bass, black crappie, yellow perch and bullhead catfish. The Pennsylvania Fish and Boat Commission stocks the lake with trout prior to the start of trout season in April. The lake is also open to ice fishing when the conditions permit.

=== Boating ===
Gas powered boats are prohibited on Keystone Lake. Non-powered and electric powered boats must display a current registration from any state or a launch permit from the Pennsylvania Fish and Boat Commission. Boat rentals and a shop with basic camping and fishing supplies are located at the main boat launch.

=== Swimming ===
A beach on the lake is open for swimming daily from 8:00am until sunset. The swimming season begins on Memorial Day weekend and ends Labor Day weekend. Lifeguards are not provided.

== See also ==
Dear Zachary: A Letter to a Son About His Father is a documentary film about Andrew and Zachary Bagby. Andrew was murdered at the park by Zachary's mother, Shirley Turner, who later murdered Zachary in a murder-suicide in Newfoundland.
