= Dear Zachary: A Letter to a Son About His Father =

2008 American documentary film

- Theatrical release poster
- Directed by: Kurt Kuenne
- Written by: Kurt Kuenne
- Produced by: Kurt Kuenne
- Cinematography: Kurt Kuenne
- Edited by: Kurt Kuenne
- Music by: Kurt Kuenne
- Production company: MSNBC Films
- Distributed by: Oscilloscope Laboratories
- Release dates: January 2008 (Slamdance Film Festival); October 31, 2008
- Running time: 93 minutes
- Country: United States
- Language: English
- Box office: $18,334

Dear Zachary: A Letter to a Son About His Father is a 2008 American documentary film written, produced, directed, edited, shot and scored by Kurt Kuenne. It is about Kuenne's close friend Andrew Bagby, who was murdered after ending a relationship with a woman named Shirley Jane Turner. Turner was arrested as a suspect, and, shortly thereafter, announced she was pregnant with Bagby's child, a boy she named Zachary Turner.

The film premiered at the Slamdance Film Festival in 2008 and received a limited theatrical release before being acquired for distribution by MSNBC. It received critical acclaim, particularly for its editing and emotional weight. Kuenne donated all profits from the film to scholarships established in the names of Andrew and Zachary Bagby.

In 2009, after watching the film, Canadian MP Scott Andrews introduced Bill C-464 (also known as "Zachary's Bill") to the Parliament of Canada. The bill, which helps protect children in relation to bail hearings and custody disputes, was signed into law the following year.

== Synopsis ==
Kurt Kuenne and Andrew Bagby grew up as close friends in the suburbs of San Jose, California. Bagby acted in many of Kuenne's amateur movies and, as these films became more professional in quality, he invested in them with some of the money he was saving up for medical school.

Near the end of his time at Memorial University in Newfoundland, Bagby began a relationship with Shirley Turner, a twice-divorced recent graduate of MUN's medical school who was nearly thirteen years his senior. Bagby's parents, friends, and associates were uneasy about the relationship because of what they saw as Turner's off-putting behavior. After graduating in 2000, Bagby moved to New York to work as a surgical resident, and Turner moved to Iowa, also for work, but they maintained a long-distance relationship. Not enjoying his surgical residency, in 2001 Bagby switched to a family practice residency in Latrobe, Pennsylvania, which he felt was a better fit for him.

Bagby's and Turner's relationship began to crumble, and Turner became increasingly possessive. On November 3, 2001, Bagby broke up with Turner at the end of a visit she made to Pennsylvania. She took her return flight to Iowa, but then, the next day, drove the almost 1,000 miles back to Latrobe, arriving early on the morning of November 5. She arranged to meet Bagby at Keystone State Park that evening, where Bagby was found dead the following morning, having been shot five times. When Turner learned she was a suspect in the murder investigation, she fled home to St. John's, Newfoundland. Kuenne began collecting footage from his old home movies and interviewed Bagby's parents, David and Kathleen, for a documentary about his friend's life.

In St. John's, Turner discovered, and later revealed, that she was pregnant with Bagby's child. She was arrested in December 2001, but released on bail while her extradition to the United States worked its way through the Canadian courts. The extradition process was repeatedly prolonged by Turner's lawyers based on legal technicalities, and Turner gave birth to a boy she named Zachary on July 18, 2002. Bagby's parents moved to Canada to attempt to gain custody of their grandson. When, in November 2002, a provincial court ruled that enough evidence pointed to Turner as Bagby's killer, Turner was again arrested, and Bagby's parents were awarded custody of Zachary.

Turner wrote to the judge who locked her up and, contrary to normal legal procedure, received advice on how to appeal her arrest and imprisonment. She was released on bail in January 2003 by Judge Gale Welsh, who felt Turner did not pose a threat to society in general. The Bagbys had to give Zachary back to Turner, but they were able to arrange a visitation schedule. While this situation dragged on, Kuenne traveled to the United Kingdom and across the U.S. to interview Bagby's friends and extended family. He went to Newfoundland and visited Zachary in July 2003.

On August 18, 2003, Turner jumped into the Atlantic Ocean with thirteen-month-old Zachary strapped to her stomach, drowning them both in a murder–suicide. Distraught over Zachary's death, and outraged at the Canadian legal system's failure to protect the child, David and Kathleen mounted a campaign to reform the country's bail laws, which they believed had helped allow Turner to kill her child and herself. Kuenne's attempts to arrange interviews with the prosecutors and judges who facilitated Turner's freedom were denied, but, in 2006, a panel convened by Newfoundland's Ministry of Justice released a report calling Zachary's death preventable and the government's handling of the case inadequate. Turner's psychiatrist was found guilty of misconduct for helping her post bail, and the director of Newfoundland's child welfare agency resigned. David Bagby wrote Dance with the Devil: A Memoir of Murder and Loss, a best-seller in Canada in 2007, about his family's ordeal. Kuenne finished his documentary and dedicated it to the memories of both Bagby and Zachary. The film ends with the Bagbys and their relatives, friends, and colleagues reflecting on the father and son, as well as the impact that Kathleen and David, whom Kurt realizes the film is really for, had on all of them.

== Production ==
Kuenne interviewed numerous relatives, friends, and associates of Andrew Bagby and incorporated their loving remembrances into a film meant to serve as a cinematic scrapbook for the son who would never know his father. Although Dear Zachary began as a project that was only intended to be shown to friends and family of Andrew Bagby, owing to the way events unfolded, Kuenne decided to release the film to the general public.

== Release ==
The film was submitted to the Toronto International Film Festival and the Sundance Film Festival, but was rejected by both. It premiered at the Slamdance Film Festival in January 2008. It was screened at Cinequest Film Festival, South by Southwest, the Hot Docs Canadian International Documentary Festival, the Sarasota Film Festival, the Sidewalk Moving Picture Festival, the Calgary International Film Festival, and the Edmonton International Film Festival, among others, before receiving a limited theatrical release in the United States, opening in one city at a time in select metropolitan areas. It was broadcast by MSNBC on December 7, 2008, and has been reaired several times since.

Dear Zachary was released on DVD on February 24, 2009, by Oscilloscope Laboratories. In December 2019, a digitally remastered "10th Anniversary Edition" of Dear Zachary was released on DVD and Blu-ray.

== Reception ==
=== Critical response ===
On the review aggregator website Rotten Tomatoes, Dear Zachary has an approval rating of 94% based on 51 reviews, with an average score of 8.10/10; the site's critical consensus reads: "Dear Zachary is both a touching tribute to a fallen friend and a heart-wrenching account of justice gone astray, skillfully put to film with no emotion spared." On Metacritic, the film has a weighted average score of 82 out of 100 based on 11 critic reviews .

Peter Debruge of Variety called the film "a virtuoso feat in editing" and noted: "The way Kuenne presents the material, with an aggressive style that lingers less than a second on most shots, it's impossible not to feel emotionally exhausted." Scott Mendelson of Film Threat called it "a one of a kind film, a searingly sad but utterly fascinating glimpse into the human wreckage left behind by a single act of violence." He liked that it focused "not on the details of death, but on the effects of life, both the life lost and those left behind to mourn." Fredrik Falk of Newser wrote of the film's importance because "it became a catalyst for change", adding "in my view, the Bagbys are among the most resilient and courageous people to ever walk this earth."

Martin Tsai of the New York Sun said the film "has so many unexpected developments that it plays like a first-rate thriller. ... and the film is so unsettling that it will stay with viewers for a long time. Like The Thin Blue Line, Dear Zachary borrows some narrative dramatic tricks, and they pay off remarkably well. It's hands down one of the most mind-blowing true-crime movies in recent memory, fiction or nonfiction."

The National Board of Review of Motion Pictures named the film one of the five top documentaries of the year. Among those who named it one of the best films of 2008 were Time Out Chicago, The Oregonian, the Times Herald-Record, Slant Magazine, and WGN Radio Chicago. The website Film School Rejects place the film third in their list of the "30 Best Films of the Decade".

=== Awards and nominations ===
The Chicago Film Critics Association nominated the film for its award for Best Documentary, and the Society of Professional Journalists presented the film with its Sigma Delta Chi Award for Best Television Documentary (Network). It also received the Special Jury and Audience Awards at the Cinequest Film Festival, was named an Audience Favorite at Hot Docs, received the Audience Awards at the St. Louis International Film Festival and the Sidewalk Moving Picture Festival, was named Best Documentary at the Orlando Film Festival, and was awarded the Jury Award for Best International Documentary at Docville (Belgium).

== Impact ==
As part of a campaign to change federal bail laws, Kuenne sent a copy of Dear Zachary to each of the over 400 members of Canada's Parliament. On October 23, 2009, MP Scott Andrews of Avalon, moved after attending a screening of the film, introduced Bill C-464 (also known as "Zachary's Bill") to the House of Commons of Canada. The goal of the bill was to protect children and force "judicial decision makers" to keep the safety of children in mind during bail hearings and in custody disputes, particularly when a child is in the custody of someone who has been charged with a "serious crime". It was introduced to the Senate of Canada on March 23, 2010, and signed into law on December 16—over seven years after Zachary's death, and over two years after the film was released.

On April 4, 2013, Kuenne released a short documentary titled The Legacy of Dear Zachary: A Journey to Change the Law on YouTube. It chronicles the completion and release of Dear Zachary and the subsequent efforts to amend Canadian law.
