= Kurt Kuenne =

American filmmaker and composer (born 1973)

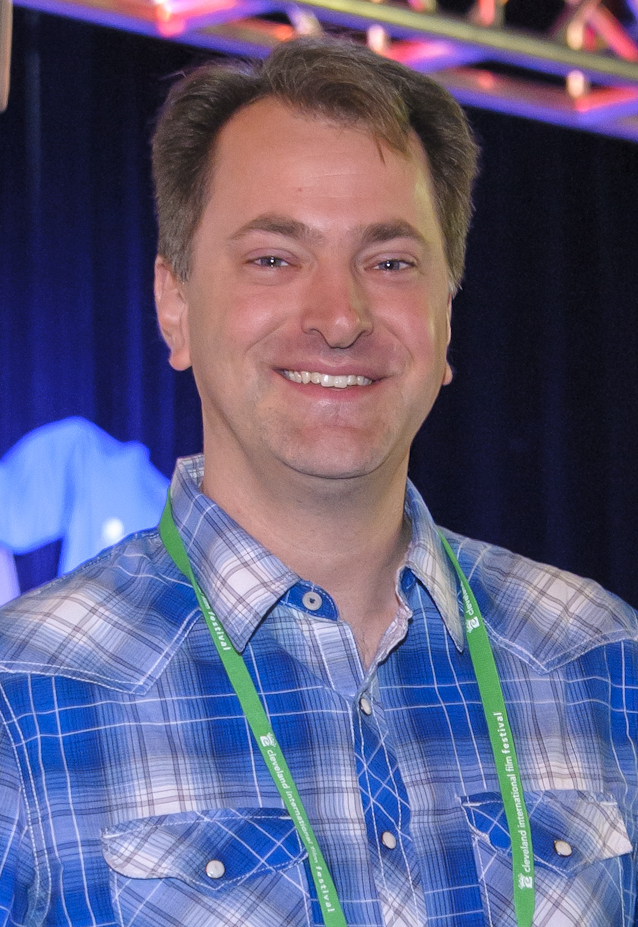
- Kurt Kuenne at the Cleveland International Film Festival 2012
- Born: October 24, 1973 (age 52); Mountain View, California, U.S.
- Education: University of Southern California
- Occupations: Filmmaker, composer, writer
- Years active: 1995–present
- Notable work: Dear Zachary: A Letter to a Son About His Father
- Website: kurtkuenne.com

Kurt Kuenne (born October 24, 1973) is an American filmmaker and composer. He has directed a number of short and feature films, including Rent-a-Person, the YouTube film Validation, described as "a romantic epic in miniature", and the documentary Dear Zachary: A Letter to a Son About His Father.

== Life ==
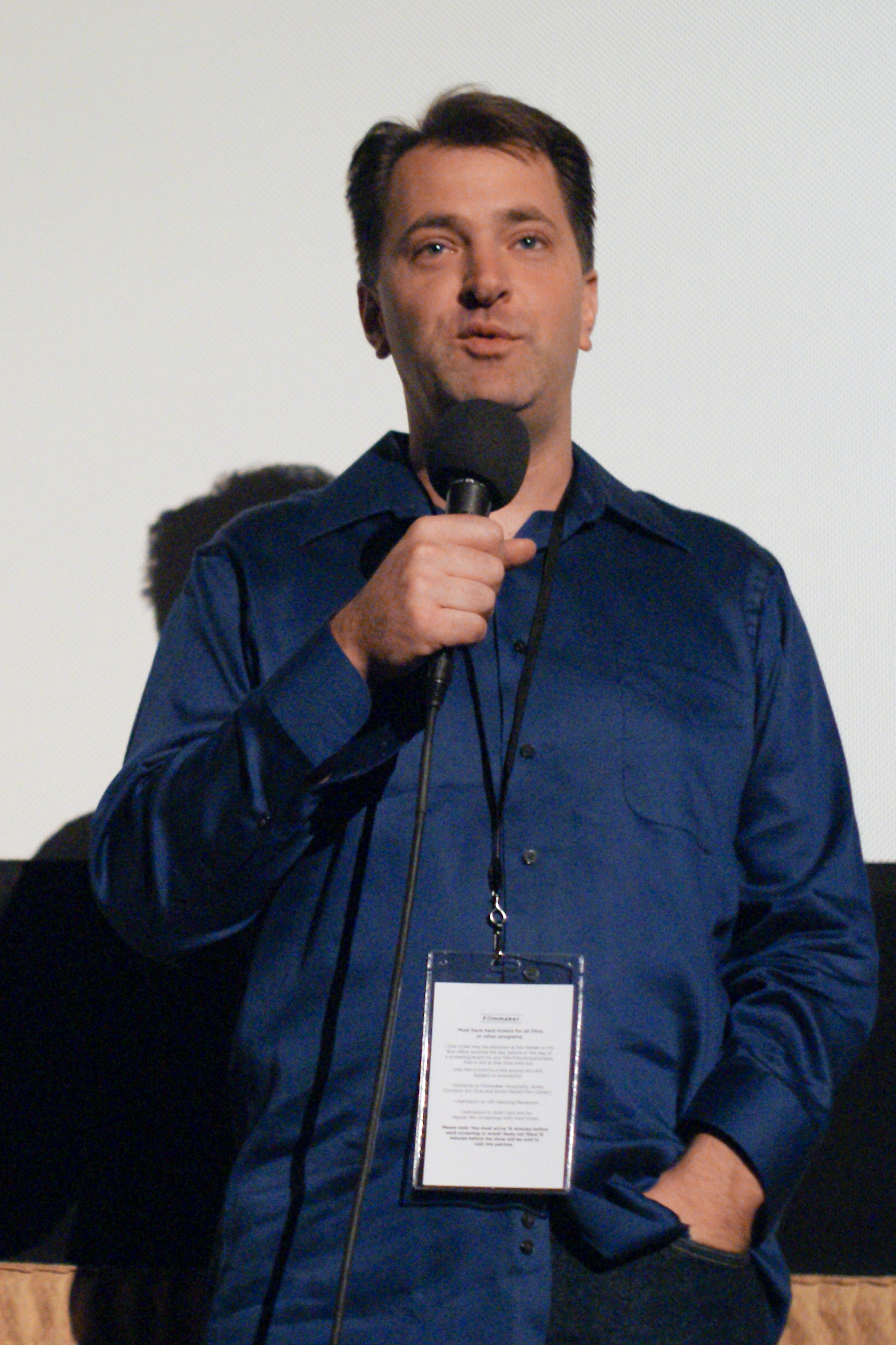
Kurt Kuenne in 2008

Kuenne was born October 24, 1973, in Mountain View, California He grew up in Northern California and began making films at aged seven on Super 8 film and later video. He attended Lynbrook High School and then studied film at University of Southern California's School of Cinema-Television, where he made Remembrances (1995) and was awarded the Harold Lloyd Scholarship in Film Editing. Kuenne then studied film composing, but returned to directing with feature Scrapbook (1999). In 2002 he was awarded an Academy of Motion Picture Arts and Sciences Nicholl Fellowship in Screenwriting for a script titled Mason Mule.

== Career ==
=== Validation ===
Validation (2007), written, directed, and scored by Kuenne, was distributed through Gay Hendricks's Spiritual Cinema Circle and is a short film about a parking attendant (played by T. J. Thyne) who dispenses compliments to his customers. It won Best Short Grand Prize at the 2007 Heartland Film Festival, and The Independent Critic rated it A+. It has received more than 10 million views on YouTube.

=== Dear Zachary ===
Kuenne's documentary Dear Zachary (2008), about the murder of his childhood friend Andrew Bagby, was received as a documentary that "will rip you apart inside and pour your guts out through your tear ducts". Kuenne produced, directed, and scored the movie by himself. The only financial help given were donations to expand the YouTube short film into a full length feature.

=== Shuffle ===
His feature film Shuffle (2011) again stars T. J. Thyne, playing a man who finds his life running out of sequence. It won the Jury Award for Best Feature at the 17th Stony Brook Film Festival.

=== Cyrano de Bergerac ===
Kuenne revised and updated his 1999 orchestral score for the 1923 silent film Cyrano de Bergerac for the premiere of the film’s 4K restoration at the Pordenone Silent Film Festival in Italy, which will be performed live to picture by the Orchestra da Camera di Pordenone, conducted by Maestro Ben Palmer. Cyrano de Bergerac was the festival’s opening event on October 4, 2025.
