= The Arches, Norfolk Island =

The Arches
- Location within Earth
- 29.0466°S 167.9421°E
- Location: Rocky Point Road, Norfolk Island, Australia

Commonwealth Heritage List
- Official name: Arched Building, Longridge
- Type: Listed place (Historic)
- Designated: 22 June 2004
- Reference no.: 105623

The Arches is a heritage-listed ruin at Rocky Point Road in the former settlement of Longridge in the Australian territory of Norfolk Island. It was added to the Australian Commonwealth Heritage List on 22 June 2004.

== History ==
A substantial agricultural station was developed at Longridge during the Second Settlement of Norfolk Island (1825-1855), during which time it was used as a penitentiary for doubly-convicted British felons. During the 1830s and 40s large gaols and barracks were built at Kingston and Longridge together with the buildings necessary for the storage of crops and other goods.

Longridge was established about nine months after the beginning of the Second Settlement in 1825. The lands here were used for corn and wheat growing and pig-raising, and had been used for some farming during the First Settlement period. Longridge became a complex of farm buildings, barracks, barns and yards, and by 1846 there were 35 structures here. The Arches, was erected after 1846 because it is not shown on the map by Mountney. It was built near the Prisoners' Barracks No 2. In 1966 the Commonwealth obtained the portion on which the building stands from members of the Brancher Nobbs family.

== Description ==
The surviving sections of the building consist of stone walling, the main wall having ten arches, with another series of openings above the arches. The rest of the structure is understood to have been constructed of timber. On the southern side there was a hipped roof, with eaves a little above the window heads. Internal floor levels, and the way in which rooms were arranged, is not known. Although the building is said by some to have been a prisoners' barrack, this is not confirmed, and may be a confusion with the Prisoners' Barracks No 2. There is a possibility that the building was used to store or load carts with farm produce, was used as stables, or that grain may have been stored in the building. There is a large drain at one end, and this is seen as evidence for the building's agricultural purposes.

The scale and design of the building are intriguing as they reflect a level of extravagance not often seen in penal settlements (Port Arthur being the primary exception). The building commands a view of a lush valley which evidently was the site of an old garden.

The ruined building, on account of its large size and dramatic appearance and its ability to evoke the past, is of notable aesthetic value in the Longridge landscape.

It is close to a number of surviving buildings outside of the heritage boundary, including a former cookhouse and a ration store and bakehouse, and Branka House, as well as plants introduced during the First and Second Settlement periods, including red cedar, citrus trees, banana trees and a Moreton Bay Fig.

== Condition ==
The building was mortared over much of its surface around 1962 and was still stable in 1984. By 2002 it was considered unstable and cracks were evident. The top section of the north wall is missing.

== Heritage listing ==
The Arches was listed on the Australian Commonwealth Heritage List on 22 June 2004 on the following basis:

The ruined building known as The Arches, at Longridge, dates from the 1840s and is historically highly significant. It is directly associated with the Second Settlement of Norfolk Island, when the Island became a prison for re-offending convicts. It is this harsh period which predominates in the Australian public's perception of Norfolk's history. Longridge was a major agricultural station on the Island at the time, and the building, constructed toward the end of the Second Settlement, was evidently an important part of the station's agricultural infrastructure. The building, with its substantial stone walling and its ten large arches and other openings, is of a scale and design which is intriguing as it reflects a level of extravagance not often seen in penal settlements.) The ruined building, on account of its large size and dramatic appearance and its ability to evoke a sense of the past in onlookers, is of notable aesthetic value in the Longridge landscape.
