= The Arches Provincial Park =

Provincial park in Newfoundland and Labrador, Canada

Coordinates: 50°06′49″N 57°39′47″W

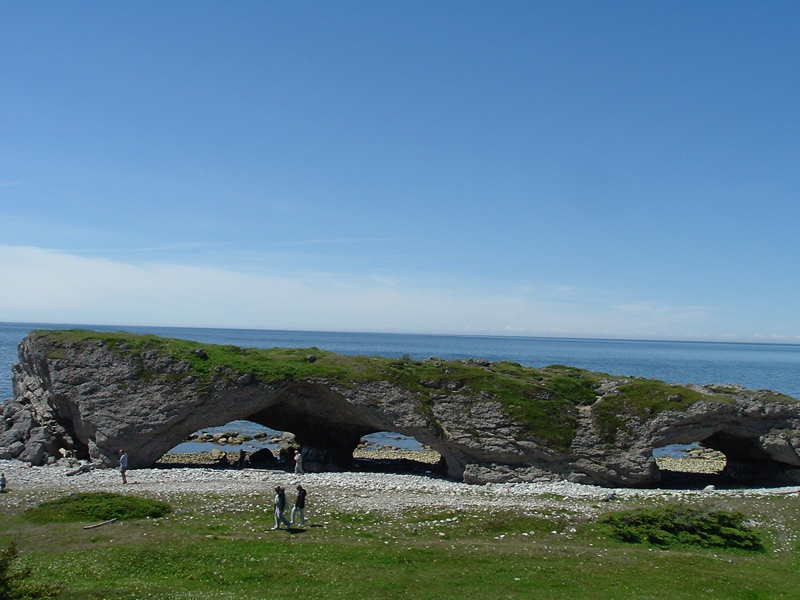

The Arches Provincial Park is a public park on the western coastline of Newfoundland and Labrador, Canada that features a photogenic rock formation.

The park is north of Gros Morne National Park near Parson's Pond along the Viking Trail, and includes a parking lot, boardwalk, and picnic area. The rock formation is composed of Ordovician aged dolomitic conglomerates of the Daniels Harbour Member of the Cow Head Group which has been eroded by sea wave action. These porous conglomerates can be oil-bearing, and areas near The Arches Provincial Park have seen some oil exploration activity.

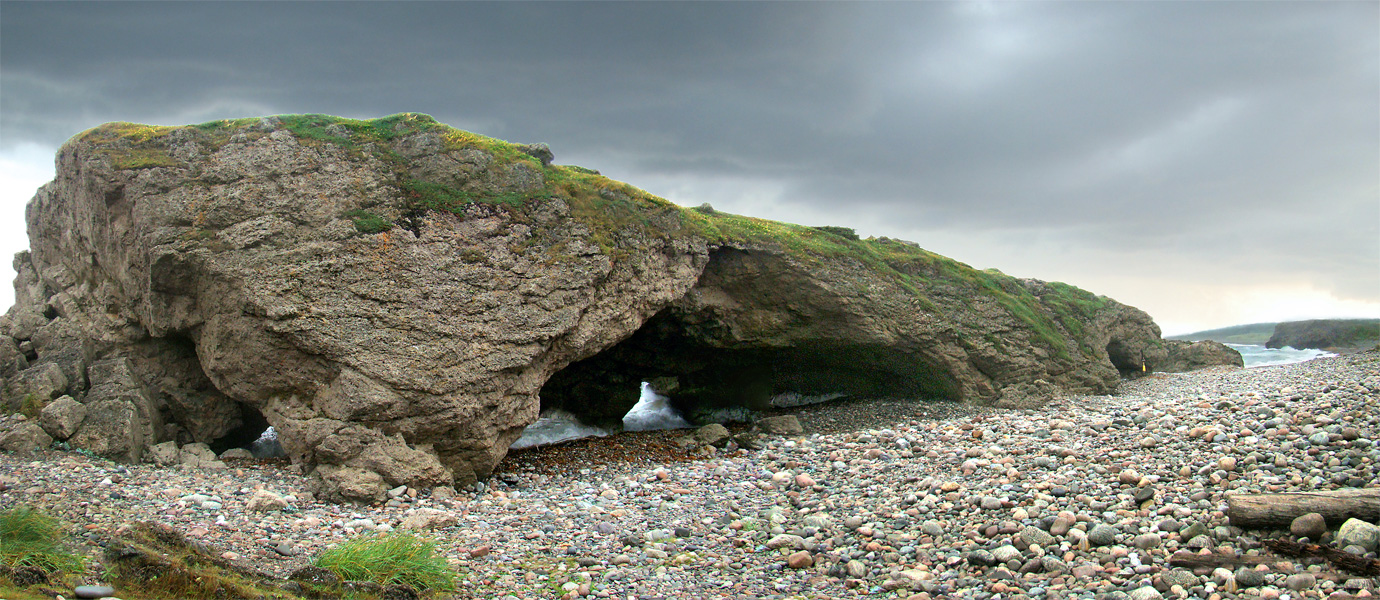

== Gallery ==
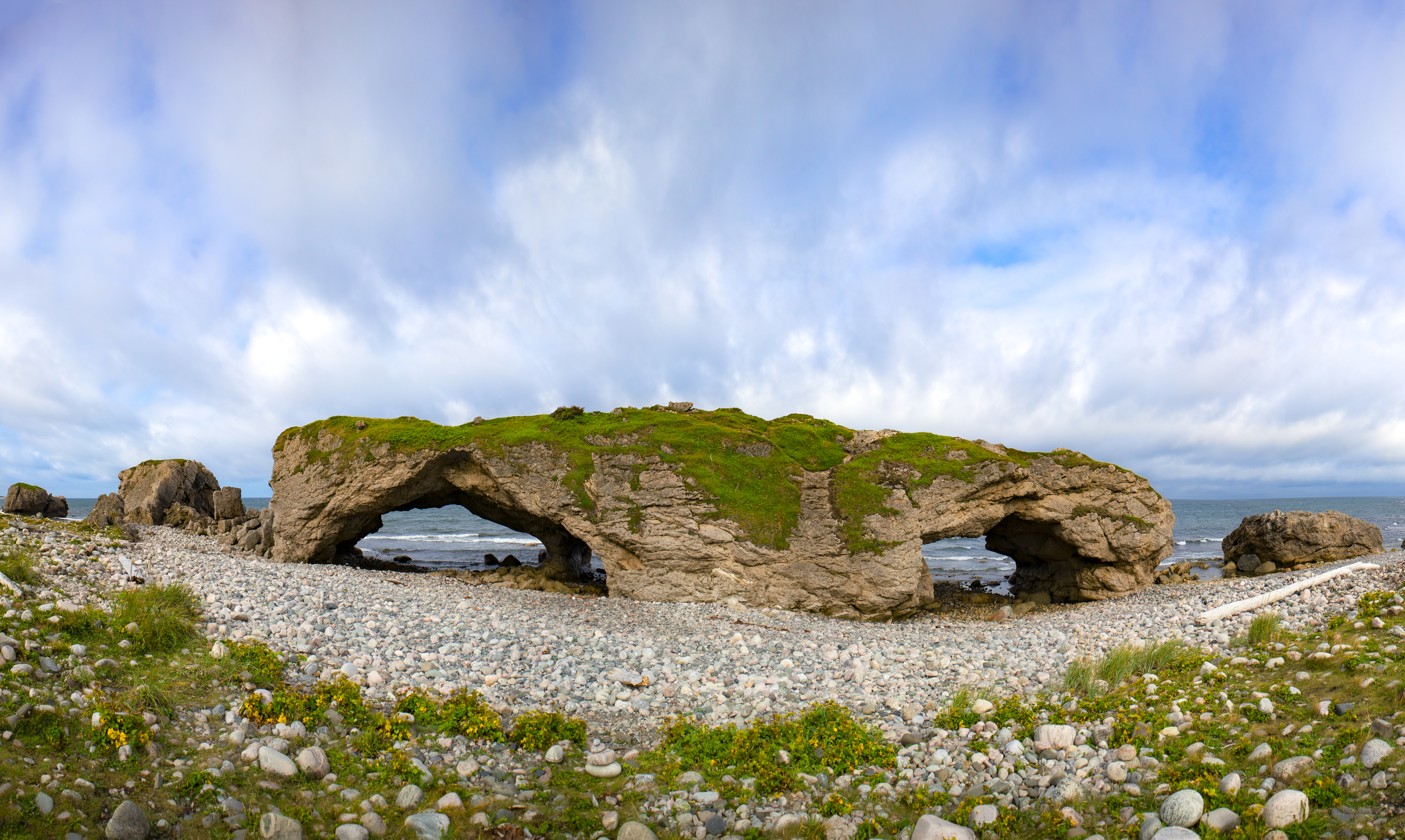
Arches Provincial Park, Newfoundland

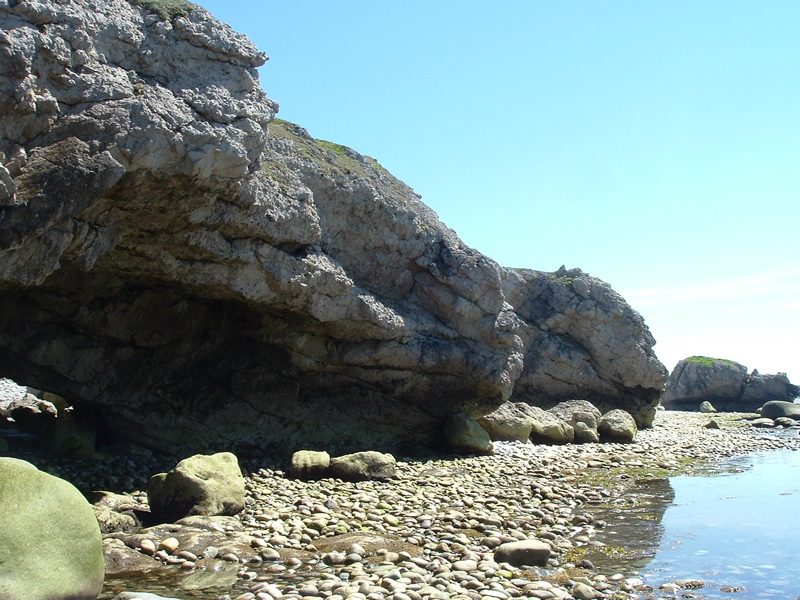

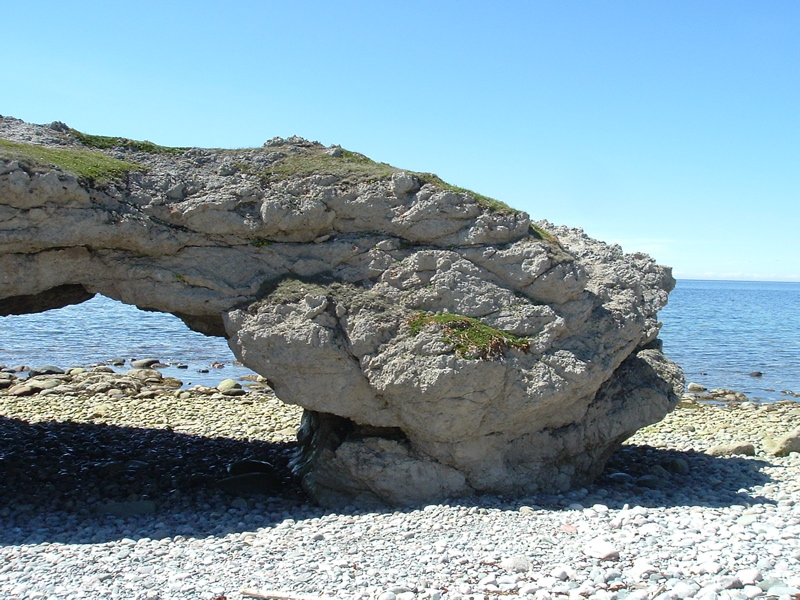

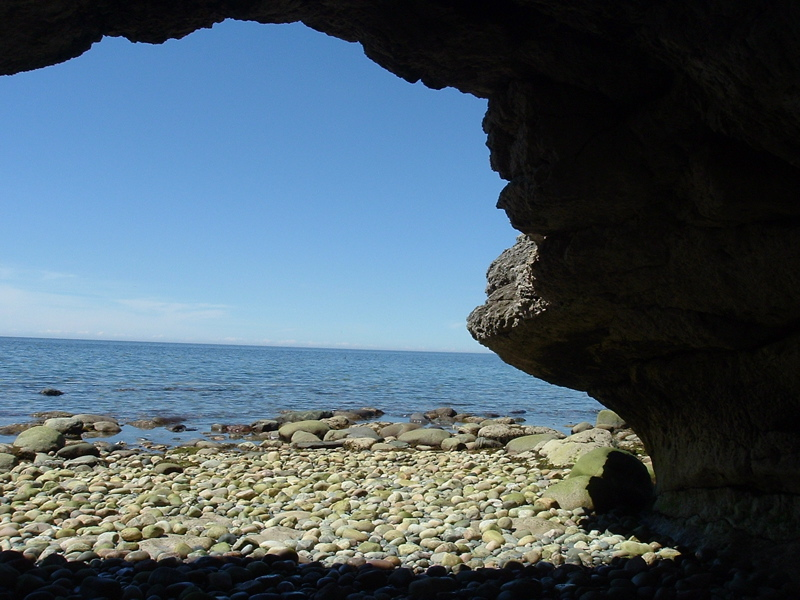

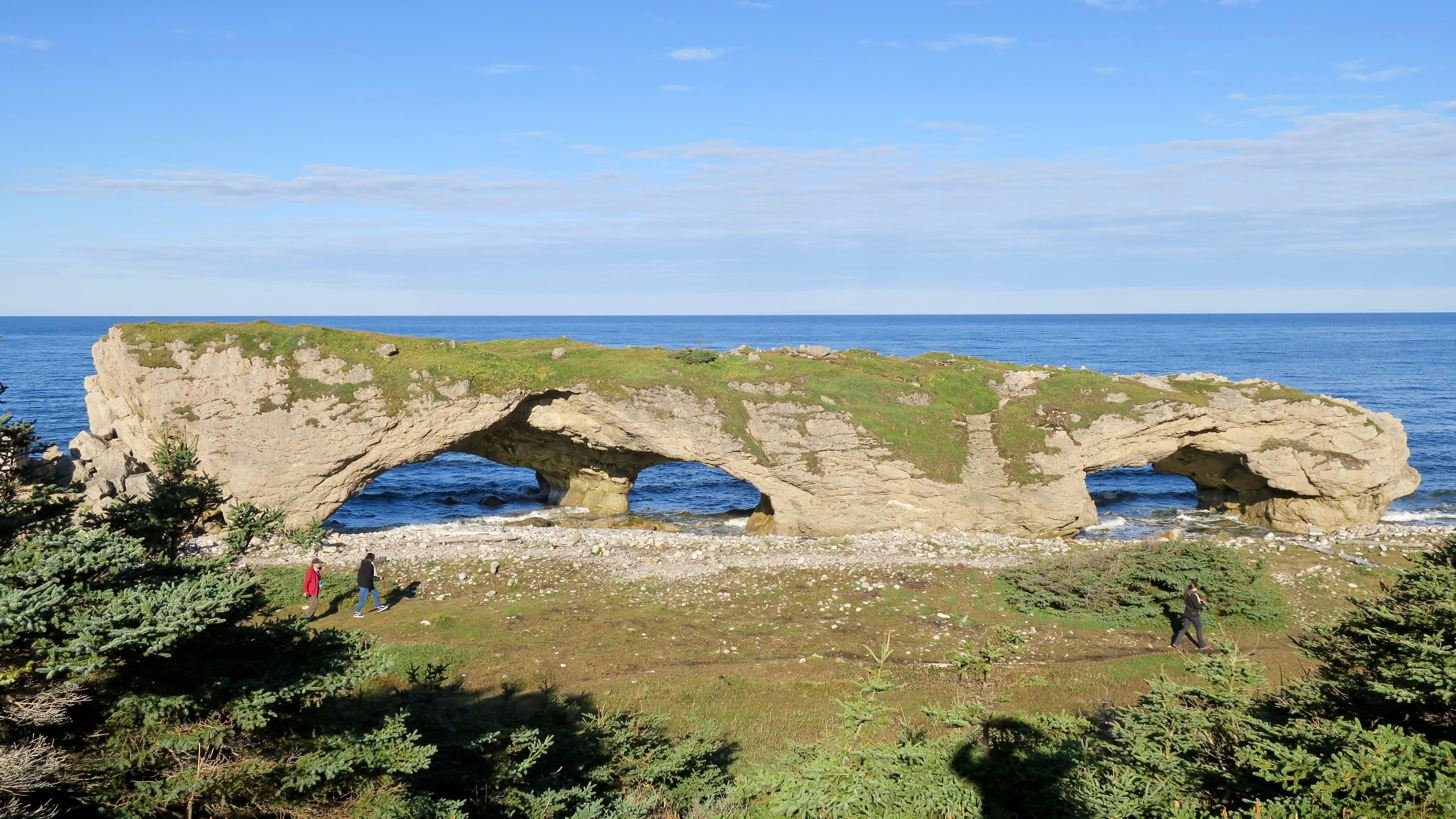

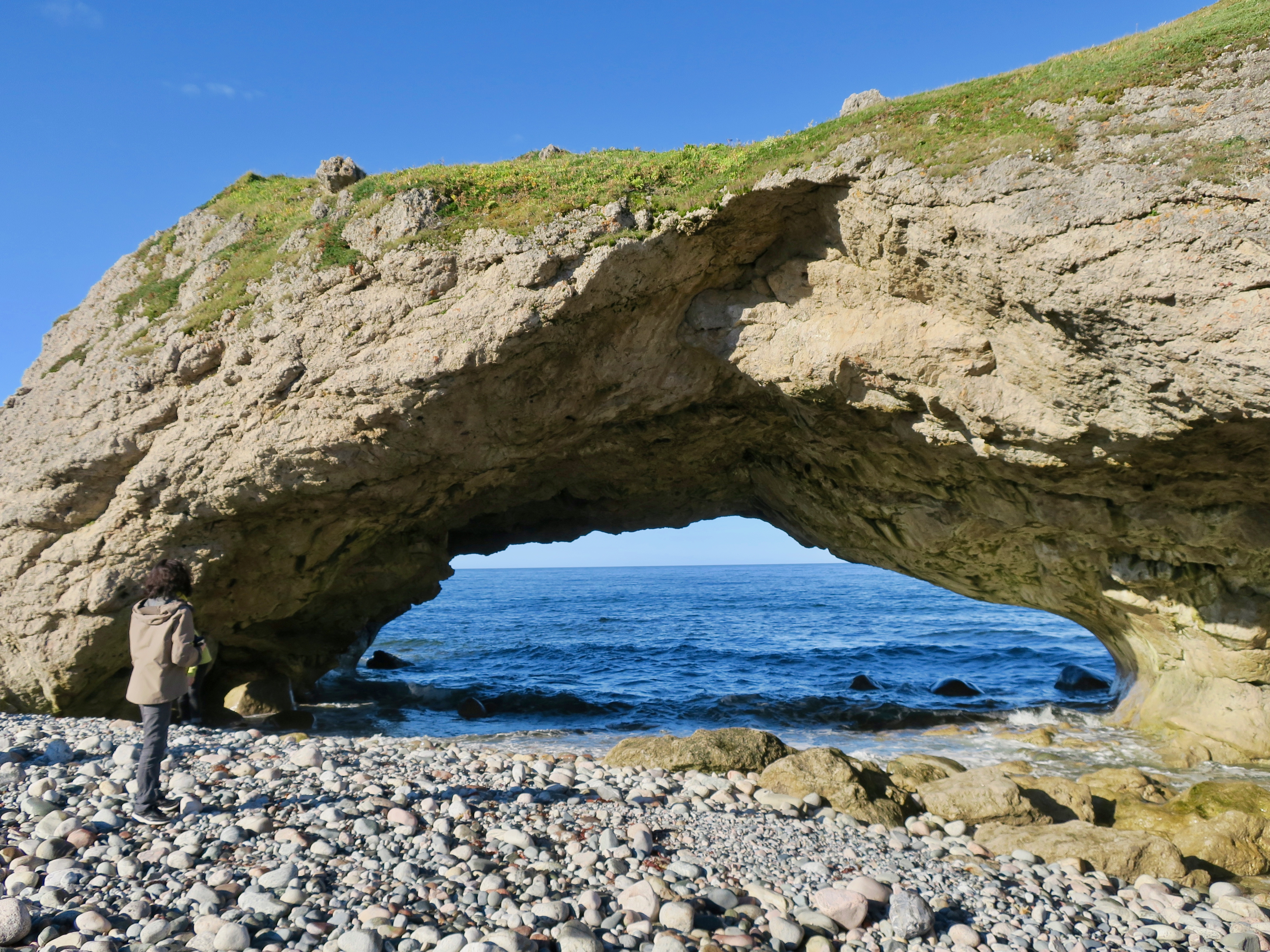

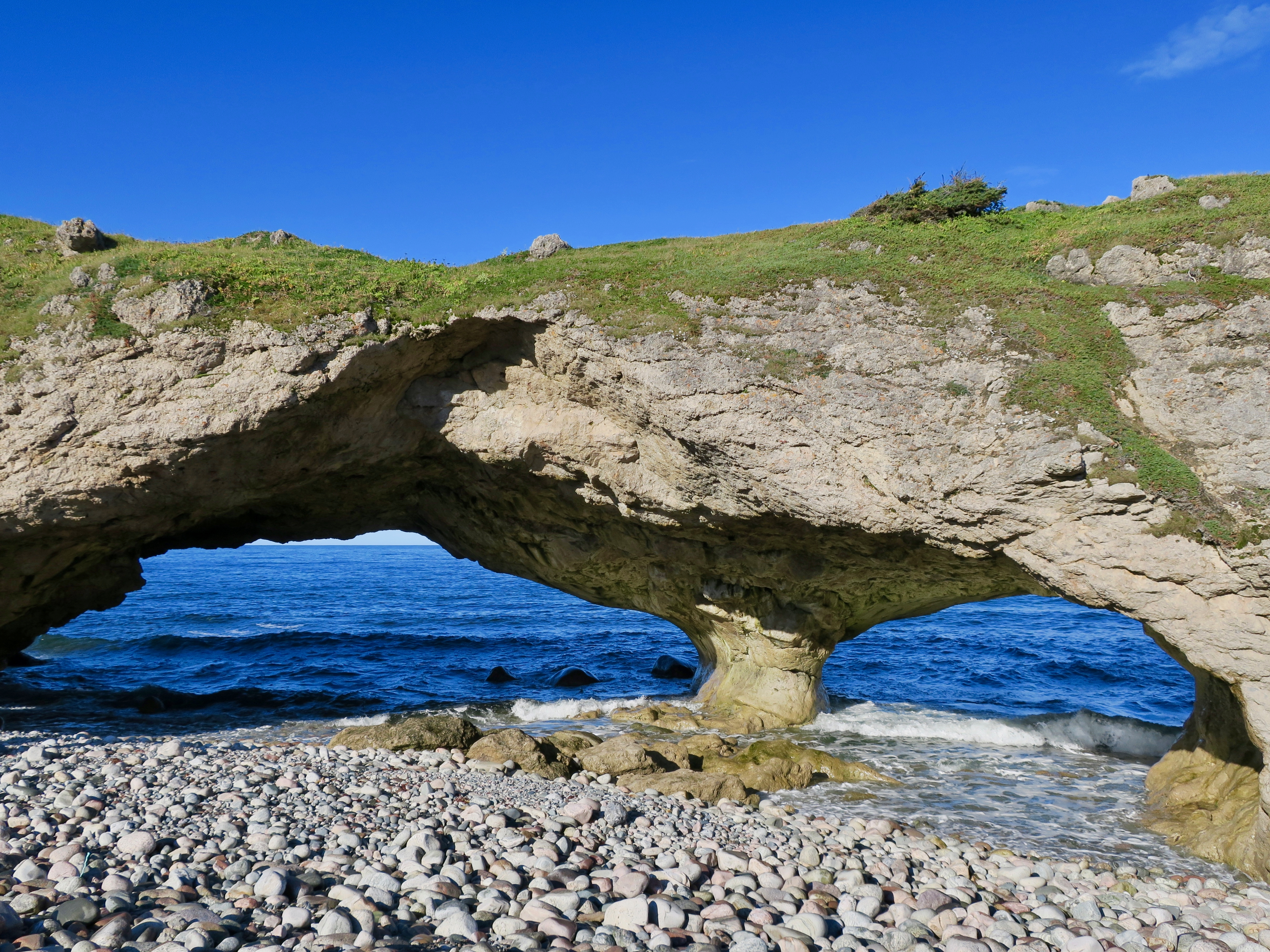

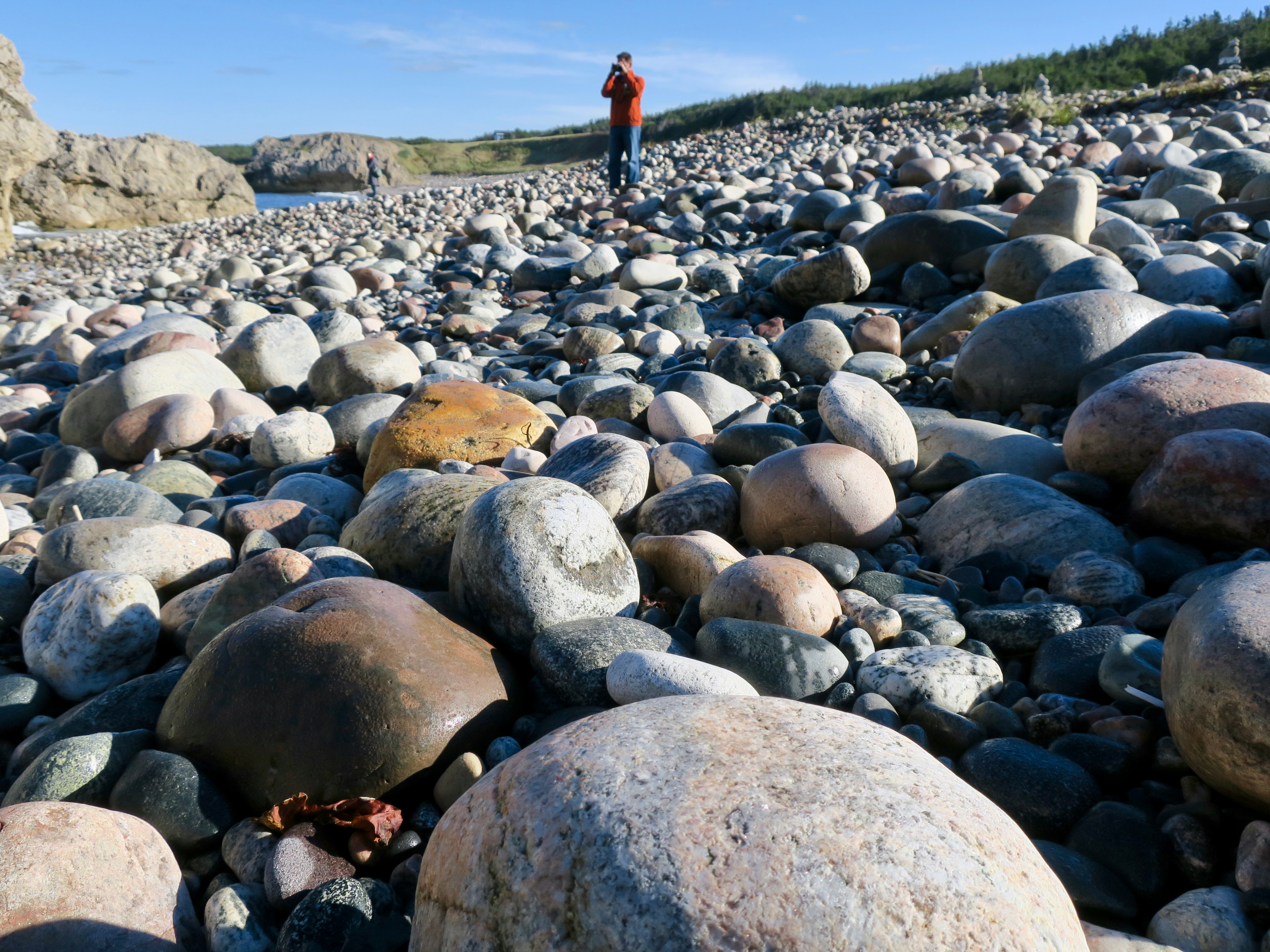
