= Use of X by Donald Trump =

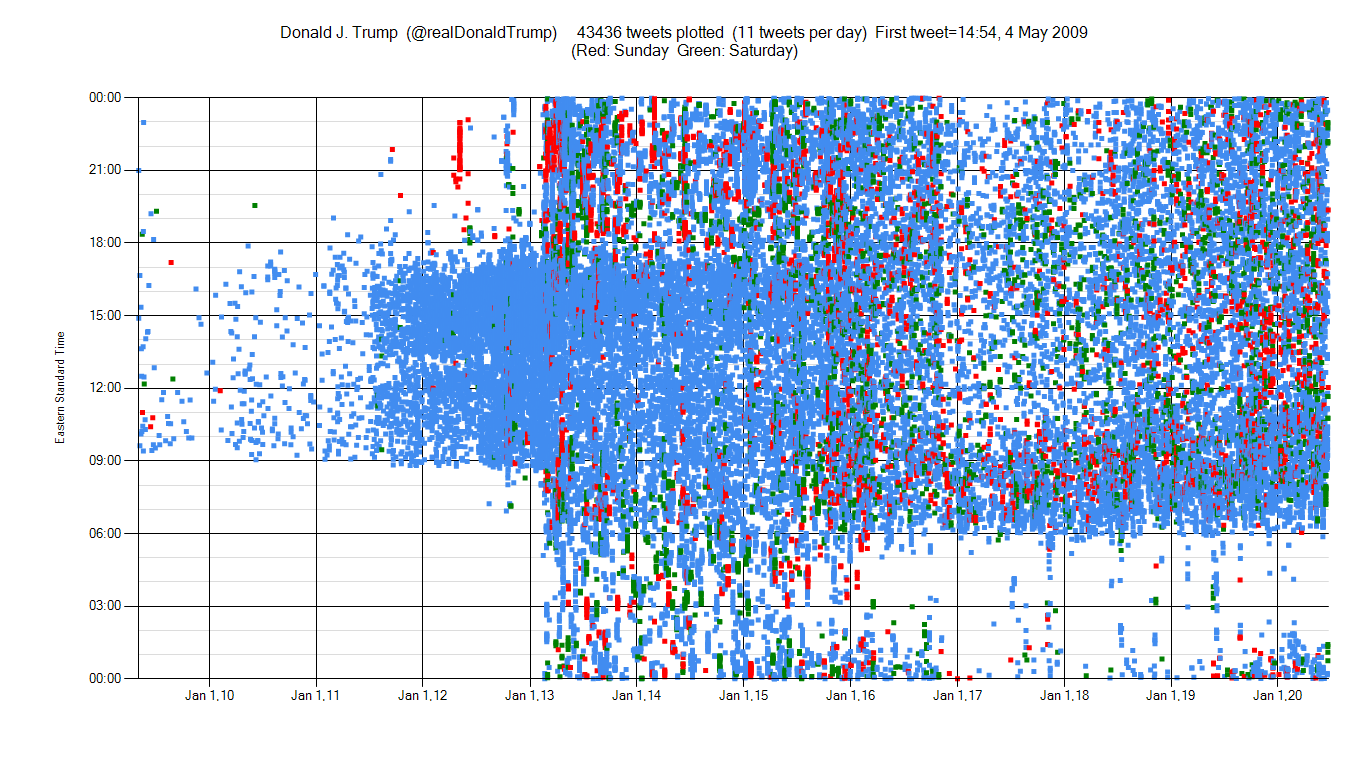
Trump's tweet activity from his first tweet in May 2009 until June 2020

Donald Trump's use of social media attracted worldwide attention since he joined Twitter (now X) in March 2009. Over nearly twelve years, Trump tweeted around 57,000 times, including about 8,000 times during the 2016 election campaign and over 25,000 times during his first presidency. The White House said the tweets should be considered official statements. When Twitter banned Trump from the platform in January 2021 during the final days of his first term, his handle @realDonaldTrump had over 88.9 million followers.

For most of Trump's first term, his account on Twitter, where he often posted controversial and false statements, remained unmoderated in the name of "public interest". Congress performed its own form of moderation: in July 2019, the House of Representatives voted mostly along party lines to censure him for "racist comments" he had tweeted. Following the censure, his tweets only accelerated. An investigation by The New York Times published in November 2019, found that, during his time in office to date, Trump had retweeted numerous conspiracy theories or fringe content.

During his 2020 reelection campaign, he falsely suggested that postal voting or electoral fraud may compromise the election, prompting Twitter to either remove such tweets or label them as disputed. After his election loss, Trump persistently undermined the election results in the weeks leading to Joe Biden's inauguration. His tweets played a role in inciting the January 2021, attack of the US Capitol during the formal counting of electoral votes. Though the Senate eventually acquitted Trump during his second impeachment, Twitter permanently suspended his @realDonaldTrump handle, followed by the official account of his campaign (@TeamTrump) and the accounts of allies who posted on his behalf, such as the Trump campaign digital director. Twitter also deleted three tweets by Trump on the @POTUS handle and barred access to the presidential account until Joe Biden's inauguration.

In November 2022, Twitter's new owner, Elon Musk, reinstated his account, and the first tweet since 2021 was made in August 2023 about his mugshot from Fulton County Jail, but the account remained inactive until he tweeted again in August 2024. In February 2025, his account surpassed 100 million followers on X.

== Background ==
From his official declaration of candidacy in 2015, Donald Trump benefited from large numbers of supporters active on social media. Some supporters called themselves "Centipedes" online.

As president, Trump preferred to communicate over social media, announcing policy changes and the dismissals of staff members there. Trump largely bypassed the White House Press Secretary, and his administration ended the daily White House press briefing. Trump preferred "to dictate and dominate the news cycle"; his communications emphasized his political grievances, promoted conspiracy theories, and attacked those he regarded as enemies.

Trump used the retweet feature on Twitter to forward messages he agreed with (often posts praising him), no matter how obscure their authors were. At times, Trump retweeted himself, and sometimes commented "so true" while doing so.

An investigation by The New York Times published in November 2019, found that, during his time in office to date, Trump had already retweeted at least 145 accounts that "have pushed conspiracy or fringe content, including more than two dozen that have since been suspended."

As Trump continued to issue brief statements, his spokesperson Liz Harrington tweeted screenshots of them under the Save America logo from June 2021 to June 2022. Since then, however, her Twitter handle @realLizUSA has been infrequently used. In April 2023, at his arraignment hearing, Trump was warned by Acting New York Supreme Court Justice Juan Merchan not to use social media to incite violence.

== Followers ==
By the time Twitter suspended Trump's Twitter account in January 2021 as a consequence of the 2021 United States Capitol attack, @realDonaldTrump had been followed by 88.7 million users.

When Trump announced his presidential campaign in 2015, he had 2.98 million followers; his follower count thereafter increased rapidly. Many of his followers, however, were fake accounts and Twitter bots: a May 2017 analysis concluded that, of the then-30.9 million followers of Trump's personal Twitter account, 51 percent were real and 49 percent were fake. In mid-2018, Twitter conducted a site-wide crackdown on fake accounts, reducing the total number of users of the site by about 6 percent; as a result, Trump lost about 100,000 of his then-53.4 million followers. Trump repeatedly complained about reductions in the number of followers, claiming that Twitter was biased against him, and raised his complaints in tweets and in a private meeting with Twitter CEO Jack Dorsey. In October 2018, the research group SparkToro estimated that more than 6 percent of Trump's followers were "bots, spam, inactive or propaganda"—a significantly higher percentage than for followers of other American politician Twitter accounts. On 2 February 2025, Trump surpassed 100 million followers.

== Public opinion ==
Trump's advisors warned him that his tweets may alienate some of his supporters. In a June 2017 Fox News poll, 70 percent of respondents said Trump's tweets hurt his agenda. In a January 2019 UMass Lowell poll, 68 percent of all respondents aged 18–37 said Trump tweeted too much.

== Rate of tweets ==
In November 2016, shortly after winning the election, Trump said in a 60 Minutes interview that, as president, his use of social media would be "very restrained, if I use it at all." Trump went on to Tweet more than 25,000 times during his presidency; by the first half of 2019, he was tweeting as frequently as he had as a candidate, and he doubled this rate during the second half of 2019 and the first half of 2020. On his most prolific day, June 5, 2020, he tweeted 200 times.

Tweets counted through Trump Twitter Archive are shown below.

Date range	Tweets	Daily average
2009 (May 4 – December 31, 2009)	56	0.2
2010 (January 1 – December 31, 2010)	142	0.4
2011 (January 1 – December 31, 2011)	774	2.1
2012 (January 1 – December 31, 2012)	3,531	9.6
2013 (January 1 – December 31, 2013)	8,138	22.3
2014 (January 1 – December 31, 2014)	5,773	15.8
2015, pre-candidacy (January 1 – June 15, 2015)	3,701	22.3
Candidacy (June 16, 2015 – November 8, 2016)	7,794	15.2
Transition (November 9, 2016 – January 19, 2017)	364	5.1
Presidency, Year 1, first half (January 20 – July 19, 2017)	1,027	5.7
Presidency, Year 1, second half (July 20, 2017 – January 19, 2018)	1,576	8.6
Presidency, Year 2, first half (January 20, 2018 – July 19, 2018)	1,472	8.1
Presidency, Year 2, second half (July 20, 2018 – January 19, 2019)	2,146	11.7
Presidency, Year 3, first half (January 20 – July 19, 2019)	2,814	15.6
Presidency, Year 3, second half (July 20 – January 19, 2020)	5,151	28.1
Presidency, Year 4, first half (January 20 – July 19, 2020)	6,014	33.2
Presidency, Year 4, second half, until account suspension (July 20, 2020 – January 8, 2021)	5,993	34.8
Candidacy, from account reinstatement (November 20, 2022 – present)	27	0

In addition to the tweets he put out, he was also the intended recipient of tweets by others. In 2019, Donald Trump was tagged on Twitter at a rate of 1,000 times per minute, according to The New York Times.

== Device security ==
After Trump's first inauguration, the White House would not comment on whether he was using a secure phone.

Before, he had been using a Samsung Galaxy S3 which only had Android 4.3.1 as its latest OS, a version of Android which Google marked as unsupported and discontinued as of Trump's inauguration. Since then, he has used an iPhone to use Twitter.

The iPhone Twitter app used by Trump in 2018 lacked certain security features, and Politico reported in May 2018 that Trump's phone "has gone as long as five months" without being checked by security experts.

On October 24, 2018, The New York Times reported that Trump was still using his personal iPhones for phone calls, even though his aides and US intelligence officials have warned him that Russian and Chinese spies are listening. Trump responded by tweeting: "I only use Government Phones." The tweet was sent from an iPhone. (In the same tweet, he claimed that he has only one such government phone and that it is "seldom used".)

Trump's @realDonaldTrump Twitter account was breached twice by Dutch hacker Victor Gevers, both times by guessing weak passwords. The first incident took place in 2016, using the guessed password "yourefired". The password was guessed because it had previously been discovered in a 2012 LinkedIn password breach. The second incident took place in October 2020, when his account was breached by guessing the password "maga2020!". Although reports of the second attack were denied by Twitter and the White House, they were later confirmed by Dutch prosecutors in December 2020.

== As official statements ==
Throughout his presidency, Trump frequently appeared to issue orders through his tweets. Whether these tweets were official directives was unclear. A US National Archives spokesman said that Trump's tweets are considered presidential records.

In 2017, the Department of Justice argued in one court case that Trump's tweets were "official statements of the President of the United States". In another case, the DOJ argued they were official policy statements but that the tweets were also "personal conduct that is not an exercise of state power". The ABA Journal wrote in 2017, "There's little caselaw on to what extent government use of social media can be considered official or a 'public forum,' which affords First Amendment protection to people who might be excluded based on their viewpoints."

In 2019, the Secretary of the US Navy said he did not interpret a Trump tweet as a "formal order to act" after Trump tweeted that the Navy should not take away Chief Petty Officer Edward Gallagher's status as a Navy SEAL.

In 2020, a court asked that Trump clarify his intention after he tweeted what appeared to be an order calling for the disclosure of documents related to Russian interference in the 2016 election. In a court filing, White House chief of staff Mark Meadows said that: "The President indicated to me that his statements on Twitter were not self-executing declassification orders and do not require the declassification or release of any particular documents."

== Timeline ==
In 2009, marketing staffer Peter Costanzo suggested to Trump that he could use social media to draw attention to his book, Think Like a Champion, which was due to be released later that year. He was unable to use the username @DonaldTrump, as it was already being used by a parody account. He and his marketing team decided to use the username @realDonaldTrump. Trump joined Twitter in March 2009 and sent out his first tweet on May 4, 2009, advertising his upcoming appearance on the Late Show with David Letterman, which was due to air a couple of days later.

From 2009 to 2011, tweets posted by the @realDonaldTrump account included the phrase "from Donald Trump" to distinguish them from those written by his staff, but by about June 2011, as Trump's use of the platform increased, those identifying labels disappeared. During the 2016 campaign, some tweets were sent from an Android phone, and others from an iPhone. The Android tweets were more likely to be sent outside of business hours and to take a more combative tone. The iPhone tweets were suspected to be written and sent by members of Trump's staff, a suspicion that was largely confirmed using sentiment analysis; machine learning and natural language processing could still frequently distinguish Trump's tweets from others sent in his name, even when staffers attempted to emulate his writing style.

In 2012, following the victory of Obama in the presidential election, Trump tweeted a chain of disparaging comments about Obama's win. He mocked Obama for playing basketball and blamed the Chinese for creating "the concept of global warming". Trump tweeted the next day, "but we'll have to live with it!" and: "We have to make America great again!" In response, Obama sarcastically quipped on The Tonight Show with Jay Leno: "this all dates back to when [he and Trump] were growing up together in Kenya", referring to the birther conspiracy.

Trump's Twitter activity significantly increased beginning in 2013; he tweeted more frequently and with more politically charged rhetoric.

Twitter was an important tool in Trump's 2016 presidential election campaign, and has been credited as contributing to his victory. Former White House communications director Anthony Scaramucci recalled that Trump: "felt that there was no separation between his brand and the media, that there was an intersection of value for himself personally between his brand and saturating it in the media". Daniel Pfeiffer, Obama's former strategy communications advisor, commented that Trump is: "way better at the internet than anyone else in the GOP which is partly why he is winning". According to The New York Times, other presidential aides have described Trump "as a sophisticated version of a parrot, given his penchant for repeating information almost unfiltered, as soon as he had processed it".

In October 2017, Trump was described as "possibly the first 'social media' and 'reality TV' president" in an article by Van Jones on CNN's website. Following Trump's inauguration, he gained control of the official US presidential Twitter account (@POTUS), which had been created by Obama. Trump's first tweets as president were made from his personal account, but he used both accounts. After Joe Biden won the 2020 presidential election, Twitter handed over the @POTUS account to Biden upon his inauguration on January 20, 2021.

== Fox & Friends ==
Trump frequently watched the Fox News show Fox & Friends and often tweeted reactions to what he had seen on the show. For example, on January 2, 2018, Trump tweeted that his "Nuclear Button" was "much bigger & more powerful" than Kim Jong-un's, following a Fox News segment about Kim's "nuclear button" minutes before. During his presidency, Trump watched several hours of cable news shows each day, using the "Super TiVo" he had installed at the White House. In 2018, news organizations had compiled lists of Trump tweets directly repeating what he was watching. The result was that stories that Fox concentrates on became nationally important stories by virtue of the fact that they appear in presidential tweets, setting up a feedback loop. During his first year in office, he mentioned the Fox & Friends Twitter account more than any other account.

== Insults ==
In January 2016, a review by The New York Times found that one in every eight posts by Trump on Twitter "was a personal insult of some kind". From the beginning of his term until May 2019, Trump had insulted 598 people (including private citizens), places, and things on Twitter; targets of insults included politicians, journalists, news outlets, television hosts and programs, former staffers and associates, government agencies, business leaders, books critical of him, the State of California and State of New York, and entire countries. The New York Times published an inventory of all of Trump's Twitter insults from 2015 until January 2021.

Trump often gave opponents nicknames such as "Crooked Hillary" for Hillary Clinton and "Lyin' Ted" for Ted Cruz. In 2015, he tweeted against an 18-year-old college student who had challenged him at a New Hampshire political forum, which led to a wave of online harassment against her. In December 2016, as president-elect, he responded to criticism from the president of United Steelworkers Local 1999 in Indiana by tweeting that the local union leader "has done a terrible job representing workers"; the union president received threatening phone calls afterward.

== International threats ==
=== 2017–2019 Qatar diplomatic crisis ===
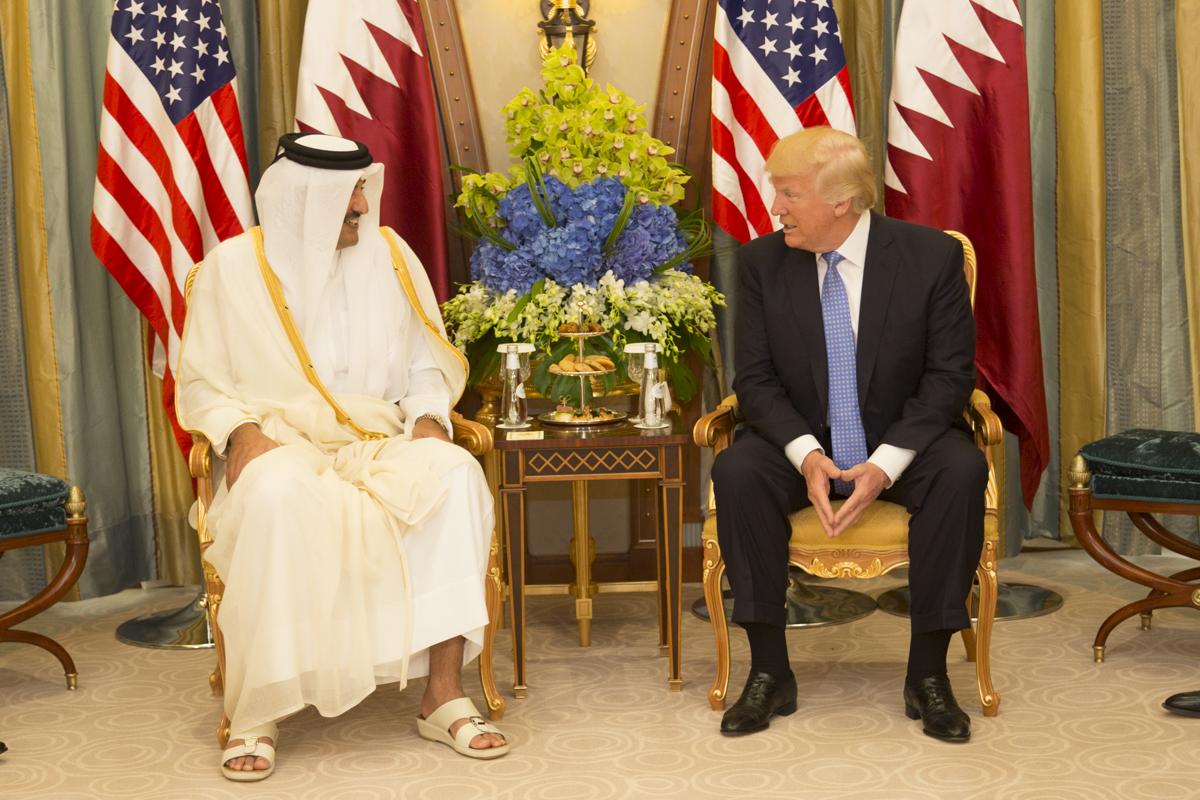
Trump with the emir of Qatar Tamim bin Hamad Al Thani, May 2017

In 2017, the Qatar diplomatic crisis erupted. An escalation of the Qatar–Saudi Arabia diplomatic conflict, it began when Saudi Arabia, United Arab Emirates, Bahrain, and Egypt abruptly cut off diplomatic relations with Qatar, alleging that the Qatari government supported terrorists. The severing of relations included withdrawing ambassadors, and imposing trade and travel bans. In a series of tweets, Trump praised the Gulf nations' move against Qatar, took credit for engineering the crisis, and repeatedly criticized Qatar, undermining simultaneous efforts by Trump's Secretary of State Rex Tillerson, US ambassador to Qatar Dana Shell Smith, and Secretary of Defense James Mattis, all of whom took a neutral stance, called for dialogue and compromise in the interests of regional security, and noted that Qatar hosted the Al Udeid Air Base.

=== Threat to destroy North Korea ===
Avatar of Donald J. Trump

Donald J. Trump
(@realDonaldTrump)
tweeted:

The🇺🇸has great strength & patience, but if it is forced to defend itself or its allies, we will have no choice but to totally destroy #NoKo.

September 19, 2017

In September 2017, Trump posted tweets about North Korea that some saw as violating Twitter's rule against making threats of violence. On September 19, he stated that under certain circumstances, "we will have no choice but to totally destroy #NoKo", and on September 23, "Just heard Foreign Minister of North Korea speak at U.N. If he echoes thoughts of Little Rocket Man, they won't be around much longer!" ("Little Rocket Man" was Trump's nickname for North Korean leader Kim Jong-un). In response to user concerns, Twitter cited newsworthiness and whether the tweet is of public interest as factors they consider in whether a tweet violates their rules. The company acknowledged that these guidelines are internal, and stated they would update their public-facing rules to reflect them.

=== Threat to destroy Iran's cultural sites ===
On January 4, 2020, Trump threatened in a tweet that "if Iran strikes any Americans, or American assets", it could expect that "52 Iranian sites (representing the 52 American hostages taken by Iran many years ago)...important to Iran & the Iranian culture" would be "HIT VERY FAST AND VERY HARD". Deliberately targeting cultural sites would have been a war crime. The next day, he tweeted: "Should Iran strike any U.S. person or target, the United States will quickly & fully strike back, & perhaps in a disproportionate manner."

== Sharing of violent, far-right, white supremacist, and extremist content ==
Trump has been criticized for his practice of retweeting or copying material from social media accounts posting antisemitic, racist, or false information, such as claims exaggerating the number of crimes committed by black people.

=== During campaign ===
PolitiFact singled out as particularly obviously false an image retweeted by Trump that claimed that 81 percent of white murder victims are killed by black people. PolitiFact noted that, besides being a five-fold exaggeration, the claim was sourced to the non-existent "Crime Statistics Bureau, San Francisco"; it later highlighted this retweet when awarding its 2015 "Lie of the Year" badge to Trump's entire presidential campaign. The fake statistics were first posted by a neo-Nazi Twitter account.

An image posted by Trump on July 2, 2016, called Hillary Clinton the "Most Corrupt Candidate Ever!" and featured a six-pointed star reminiscent of the Jewish Star of David; the image first appeared in a June 15 tweet by @FishBoneHead1, a Twitter account described by the Associated Press as being known for "anti-Clinton and right-leaning messages and images" and by Mic as promoting "violent, racist memes", before making its way to 8chan's /pol/ on June 22. Trump's social media manager Dan Scavino responded that the image had been sourced by him from a Twitter page "where countless images appear" and that he had assumed that the star referred to a sheriff's badge. Less than two hours later, the tweet was deleted from Trump's account in favor of a nearly identical tweet with a circle in place of the star, but Trump later blamed the deletion on his staff, stating: "I would've rather defended it." Jeremy Diamond of CNN observed: "It wasn't the six-pointed star alone that evoked anti-Semitism – it's the combination of the star with a background of money and an accusation of corruption, which suggests stereotypical views of Jews and money and raises conspiracy theories that Jews control political systems." The episode led Dana Schwartz, a Jewish employee of Trump's son-in-law Jared Kushner, to write an open letter to him in protest, to which he responded.

=== CNN wrestling video ===
On July 2, 2017, Trump tweeted a video of himself attacking Vince McMahon during WrestleMania 23 with the CNN logo over McMahon's face. In response, Brian Stelter of CNN issued a statement saying that Trump was "encouraging violence against reporters" and "involved in juvenile behavior far below the dignity of his office". CNN also responded to the tweet by quoting Sarah Huckabee Sanders who claimed the previous week "The president in no way form or fashion has ever promoted or encouraged violence." Homeland Security Advisor Tom Bossert said that "no one would perceive [the tweet] as a threat". Trump subsequently said that CNN took the post too seriously, adding that CNN has "hurt themselves very badly".

The clip appeared on pro-Trump subreddit, r/The Donald, about four days earlier, and was created by a Reddit account which had previously posted racist, antisemitic and bigoted content. A White House official later denied that the video came from Reddit; the official "declined to respond to questions about where the president obtained the clip". As of December 20, 2017, the tweet had been retweeted over 330,000 times, making it Trump's most retweeted post.

=== Britain First videos ===
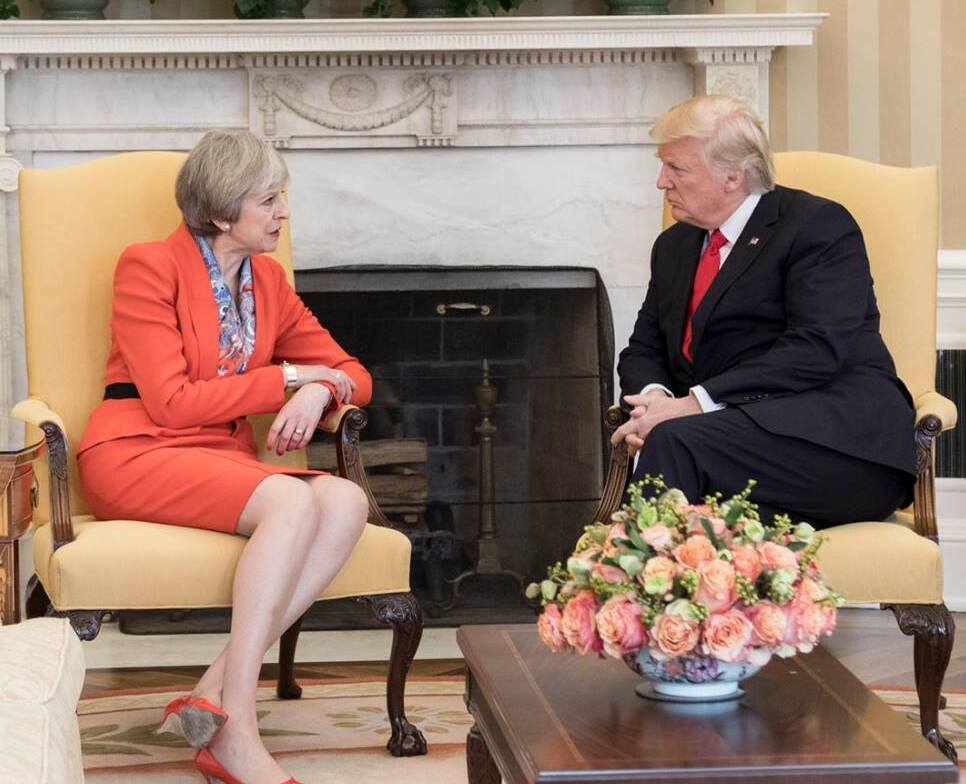
Trump with Prime Minister Theresa May in the Oval Office at the White House in January 2017. The May government condemned Trump's tweets and Britain First.

On November 29, 2017, Trump retweeted three inflammatory and unverified anti-Muslim videos from Britain First, a British far-right and ultranationalist group that has a history of posting misleading videos. One of the videos purported to show an assault by a Muslim immigrant, but the assailant was neither a Muslim nor an immigrant. Another video was filmed in 2013 during the Syrian Civil War, showing a man, who is believed to be an Al-Nusra supporter, destroying a statue of Mary and stating: "No-one but Allah will be worshipped in the land of the Levant." A third video contains footage filmed during a period of violent unrest in Egypt following the 2013 overthrow of that country's president Mohamed Morsi. The videos had been shared by Britain First deputy leader Jayda Fransen, who was convicted of religiously aggravated harassment in Britain in 2016. Trump's promoting inflammatory content from an extremist group was without precedent among modern American presidents.

Trump's actions were widely condemned both in the US and abroad by politicians, commentators and religious leaders of various faiths and across the political spectrum; also by several civil rights and advocacy groups and organizations. The incident resulted in calls for Trump to be banned from the UK, but his invitation to visit the United Kingdom was not withdrawn. When asked by PBS NewsHour, 29 Democratic and four Republican senators criticized the tweets. Prime Minister of the United Kingdom Theresa May said in a statement, "it is wrong for the president to have done this" and "Britain First seeks to divide communities through their use of hateful narratives which peddle lies and stoke tensions." Then Foreign Secretary Boris Johnson called Britain First a "hateful" organization which does not reflect British values. However, he did abstain from calling out Trump for sharing the videos.

Trump's sharing of the tweets was praised across far-right circles, increased Islamophobic comment on social media, and elevated the profile of Britain First. In Britain, Fransen and Britain First leader Paul Golding hailed Trump's re-tweets, saying: "Donald Trump himself has retweeted these videos and has around 44 million followers! God Bless You Trump!"

White House press secretary Sarah Huckabee Sanders defended Trump's tweets, saying "Whether it's a real video [sic], the threat is real and that is what the president is talking about." On November 30, 2017, Sanders said that Trump's actions "elevate the conversation to talk about a real issue and a real threat, that's extreme violence and extreme terrorism'. Trump responded to criticism from May by publicly rebuking her on Twitter, sparking a rare rift between the United Kingdom and the United States. On December 18, almost three weeks after being retweeted by Trump, the accounts of Britain First, Paul Golding and Jayda Fransen were all suspended by Twitter.

In a January 2018 interview with Piers Morgan for Good Morning Britain, Trump said he was not familiar with Britain First when he retweeted them, stating, "If you are telling me they're horrible people, horrible, racist people, I would certainly apologise if you'd like me to do that."

=== South Africa ===
In August 2018, Trump tweeted that he had asked Secretary of State Mike Pompeo to "closely study the South Africa land and farm seizures and expropriations and the large scale killing of farmers". The tweet was sent shortly after a segment by Fox News where Tucker Carlson claimed that the "racist government of South Africa" was targeting white-owned farms for land reform due to anti-white racism. In response, South Africa's Minister for International Relations and Cooperation Lindiwe Sisulu claimed that Trump was expressing "right-wing ideology" and also added that the South African government had requested an explanation for the tweet from the US chargé d'affaires. The US Embassy in South Africa rebuked Trump's tweet, claiming that there is "no evidence that murders on farms specifically target white people or are politically motivated". There were no reliable figures that suggested white farmers were at greater risk of being killed than the average South African, and the fact-checking organization Afri-Check claimed that "whites are less likely to be murdered than any other race group" in South Africa. The talking point is often used by far-right groups as evidence for a white genocide in South Africa. This has been condemned as false by Genocide Watch.

=== Katie Hopkins ===
In July and August 2019, Trump retweeted British commentator Katie Hopkins. In one of these tweets, Hopkins praised four right-wing politicians: Jair Bolsonaro of Brazil, Matteo Salvini of Italy, Victor Orban of Hungary and Jarosław Kaczyński of Poland. In that same tweet, Hopkins said that, "god-willing/jihadi-failing", she would be alive to see "Boris Johnson in Number 10", "Trump in the White House", and "Netanyahu building Israel". Another comment that Trump retweeted was Hopkins' attack on London mayor Sadiq Khan, in which she blamed him for the city's violent crime rate. Twitter permanently suspended Hopkins' account in June 2020 for violating its "Hateful Conduct" policy.

=== Allusions to violence in May 2020 ===
Trump made violent allusions in two late-night tweets in May 2020. In one message, Trump retweeted a video in which one of his supporters (Couy Griffin, a county commissioner in New Mexico and founder of "Cowboys for Trump") says, "The only good Democrat is a dead Democrat." Griffin subsequently said that he was speaking of a "political death" rather than a literal death, but then spoke of an uprising if Democrats win the election and suggested executing Democrats. Twenty-five hours later, Trump tweeted, in reference to violence in Minneapolis, "When the looting starts, the shooting starts." This message was subsequently flagged by Twitter as "glorifying violence" (see below).

=== OANN conspiracy theory ===
Avatar of Donald J. Trump

Donald J. Trump
(@realDonaldTrump)
tweeted:

Buffalo protester shoved by Police could be an ANTIFA provocateur. 75 year old Martin Gugino was pushed away after appearing to scan police communications in order to black out the equipment. @OANN I watched, he fell harder than was pushed. Was aiming scanner. Could be a set up?

June 9, 2020

In a tweet on June 9, 2020, Trump falsely claimed that a 75-year-old George Floyd protester in Buffalo, New York, who was knocked to the ground by two police officers, "fell harder than he was pushed", and could be an "antifa provocateur". Trump's tweet referred to a conspiracy theory promoted by the far-right One America News Network (OANN) channel and Kristian Rouz of OANN, who has also worked for the Russian propaganda outlet Sputnik News. The OANN claim was itself based on a claim on an anonymous right-wing blog. No evidence supported Trump's claims that the man was an "antifa" member, that the incident was a setup, that the man fell "harder than he was pushed", or that the man was attempting to "scan" police devices.

=== "White power" video clip ===
On June 28, 2020, Trump retweeted a video showing profane arguments between anti-Trump and pro-Trump protesters in The Villages, Florida, a retirement community. In the video, a pro-Trump protester can twice be heard yelling "white power" at the anti-Trump protesters. In his tweet, Trump thanked the pro-Trump protesters shown in the video, calling them "great people".

The tweet was widely criticized as racist. Senator Tim Scott of South Carolina (the Senate's sole black Republican) called the tweet "indefensible" and asked Trump to delete it. Trump subsequently deleted the post, without condemning the "white power" statement or disavowing his supporter's act. White House Deputy Press Secretary Judd Deere defended Trump, claiming "President Trump is a big fan of The Villages. He did not hear the one statement made on the video. What he did see was tremendous enthusiasm from his many supporters."

Many White House officials claimed to have tried to reach out to Trump while the tweet was still up asking him to delete it, but that they couldn't reach him because he had put his phone down while playing golf at his Virginia golf club.

== Election claims and grievances ==
=== 2016 campaign: Trump Tower wiretapping allegations ===
Avatar of Donald J. Trump

Donald J. Trump
(@realDonaldTrump)
tweeted:

Terrible! Just found out that Obama had my "wires tapped" in Trump Tower just before the victory. Nothing found. This is McCarthyism!

March 4, 2017 (Note: The original tweets about wiretapping are, in chronological order: Trump, Donald J. [@realDonaldTrump] (March 4, 2017). "Terrible! Just found out that Obama had my "wires tapped" in Trump Tower just before the victory. Nothing found. This is McCarthyism!" (Tweet). Archived from the original on January 7, 2021 – via Twitter.; Trump, Donald J. [@realDonaldTrump] (March 4, 2017). "Is it legal for a sitting President to be "wire tapping" a race for president prior to an election? Turned down by court earlier. A NEW LOW!" (Tweet). Archived from the original on January 7, 2021 – via Twitter.; Trump, Donald J. [@realDonaldTrump] (March 4, 2017). "I'd bet a good lawyer could make a great case out of the fact that President Obama was tapping my phones in October, just prior to Election!" (Tweet). Archived from the original on January 7, 2021 – via Twitter.; Trump, Donald J. [@realDonaldTrump] (March 4, 2017). "How low has President Obama gone to tapp my phones during the very sacred election process. This is Nixon/Watergate. Bad (or sick) guy!" (Tweet). Archived from the original on January 7, 2021 – via Twitter.)

In a succession of tweets on March 4, 2017, Trump stated he had "just found out" that his predecessor Obama had wiretapped the phones in his offices at Trump Tower during the last months of the 2016 election. Trump did not say where he had obtained the information and offered no evidence to support it. Trump compared the alleged intrusion to McCarthyism and Watergate. Anonymous White House officials told The Washington Post that Trump did not appear to coordinate his comments with other White House officials.

Although no evidence supported Trump's claims, the tweets resulted in a week of media attention. Fake news websites also took up the allegations, and one falsely claimed that a warrant for Obama's arrest had been given.

=== 2016 campaign: Investigation into Russian influence ===
Trump repeatedly attacked former FBI director James Comey, whom Trump dismissed from office, via Twitter. He also posted a number of angry tweets directed at Robert Mueller, who was appointed as a special prosecutor to investigate Russian interference in the 2016 presidential election.

=== 2020 campaign: Suggestion of delaying election ===
On July 30, 2020, Trump claimed that universal mail-in ballots for the 2020 election will lead to widespread fraud. He then suggested that the election should be "delayed"—something that Trump lacked the power to do. Trump's proposal came with widespread backlash from leaders across the political spectrum, including from Democratic House speaker Nancy Pelosi (who noted that only Congress could change the date of the election) and Senate Republicans who rarely criticized Trump. Later that day, Trump said in a press conference that he does not want to see a delay in the election but repeated his claims about voter fraud.

=== 2020 election: Attempt to overturn results ===
Avatar of Donald J. Trump

Donald J. Trump
(@realdonaldtrump)
tweeted:

The Vice President has the power to reject fraudulently chosen electors.

January 5, 2021

On January 5, 2021—the day before Congress convened in joint session to count the electoral votes and formalize Biden's victory in the presidential election—Trump falsely claimed on Twitter that Vice President Mike Pence had the power to toss out "fraudulent" electoral votes.

On January 6, after a violent pro-Trump mob stormed the Capitol and disrupted the counting of electoral votes, Twitter declared that they had indefinitely locked Trump's account for "repeated and severe violations" of the site's Civic Integrity policy. "Locking" meant that Trump could not post new tweets, although his existing tweets could still be viewed by the public. Twitter Safety said that, if Trump deleted three specific tweets, a 12-hour waiting period would go into effect and then his account would be unlocked. The tweets were immediately deleted. Overnight, while Trump's account was still locked, a message from him was posted to his assistant Dan Scavino's account. In that message, Trump promised "an orderly transition on January 20th" but also emphasized that "I totally disagree with the outcome of the election" and that this moment was "only the beginning of our fight".

Trump would only tweet three more times from his personal account. His next tweet was on January 7 at 7:10 p.m. Eastern; it was a brief video that was widely reported in the news as his concession speech. In the video, he acknowledged that a new administration would be sworn into office and that he would no longer be president. On January 8 at 9:46 a.m. Eastern, he called the people who voted for him "American Patriots", assured they would have a "GIANT VOICE", and affirmed they would not tolerate disrespect. At 10:44 a.m. Eastern, he tweeted "I will not be going to the Inauguration on January 20th." Later that day, Twitter permanently suspended Trump's account, stating that Trump's continued tweeting was "likely to inspire others to replicate the violent acts that took place on January 6, 2021" and that there were "multiple indicators that they are being received and understood as encouragement to do so".

On December 3, 2022, Trump called for "the termination of all rules, regulations, and articles, even those found in the Constitution" to allow him to be declared winner of the 2020 election or to rerun the election. He was complaining about a new revelation that, several weeks before the election, Twitter's corporate policy teams had debated whether to allow distribution of a particular story unfavorable to Biden; a newspaper claimed to have information about a computer belonging to Biden's son, and Twitter leaders had discussed whether it ran afoul of their content rules about "hacked materials". Trump posted his complaint about the U.S. Constitution to his own platform, Truth Social. At this time, Twitter had already reinstated his account, but Trump had not resumed posting to that platform.

== Other controversial tweets ==
=== Comments on Sadiq Khan ===
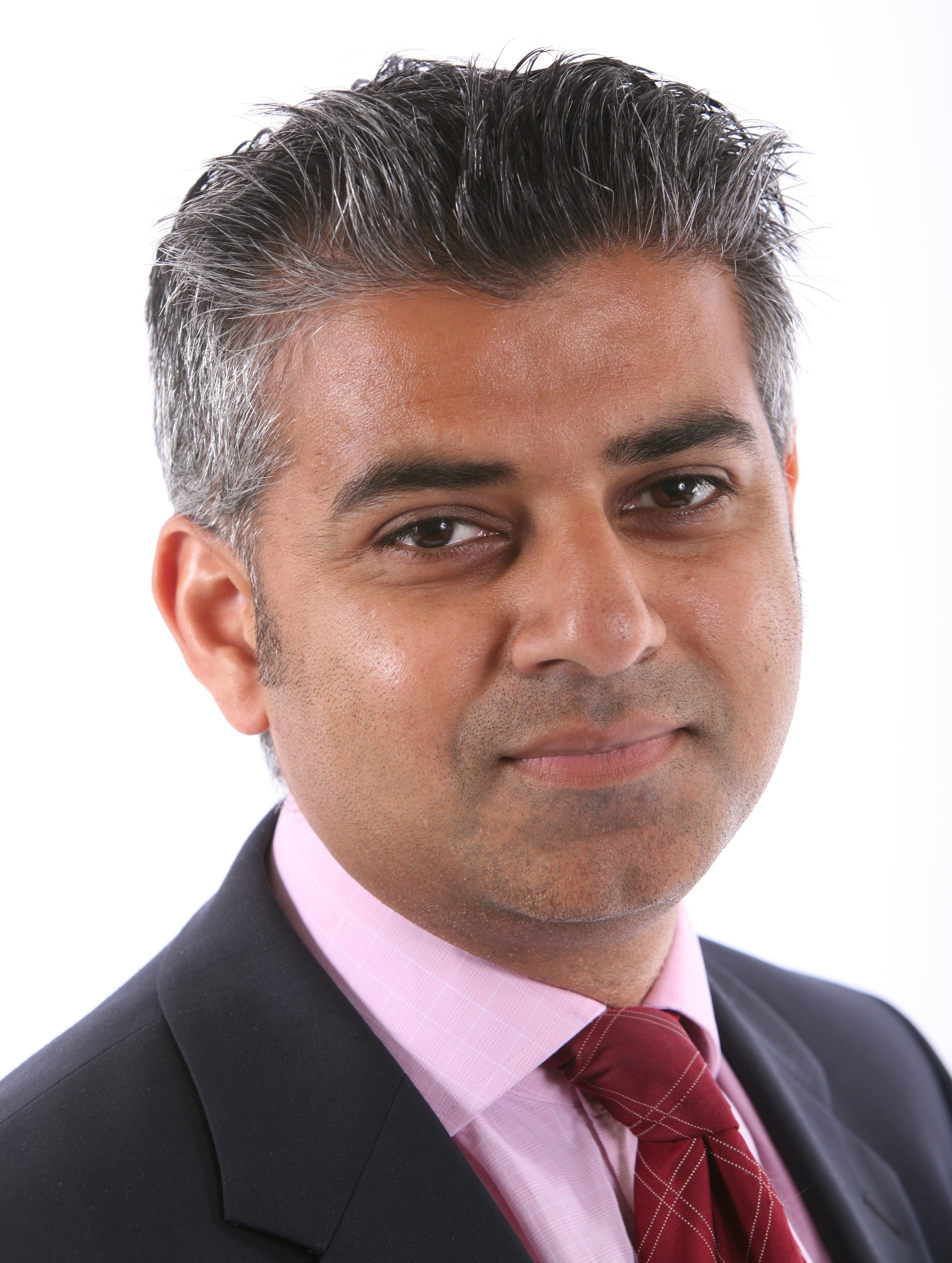
Mayor of London Sadiq Khan

After the 2017 London Bridge attack, Mayor of London Sadiq Khan condemned it and said that "the city remains one of the safest in the world" and there was "no reason to be alarmed" over the increased police presence around the city. The latter comment was taken out of context and criticized by Trump in a tweet: "At least 7 dead and 48 wounded in terror attack and Mayor of London says there is 'no reason to be alarmed!'"

Trump's comments were described as a deliberate misrepresentation of Khan's remarks by Khan's spokesman, as well as by former US vice president Al Gore. Prime Minister Theresa May said that "Sadiq Khan is doing a good job and it is wrong to say anything else". Conservative minister Penny Mordaunt and Liberal Democrat leader Tim Farron also backed Khan. Farron said, "Sadiq Khan has shown calm and dignified resolve in the face of these cowardly terrorist attacks. He is more of a statesman than Donald Trump will ever be." Lewis Lukens, the former US ambassador to the UK, and the United States Conference of Mayors declared their support, with Lukens commending Khan's "strong leadership" in leading London forward after the attack and also praising the "extraordinary response" from the law enforcement community. Trump tweeted the following day that the London Mayor was offering a "pathetic excuse" for his statement, and alleging that the mainstream media were "working hard to sell" Khan's explanation. When asked about these comments following a vigil held near Tower Bridge, Khan stated that he was busy dealing with the aftermath of the attack and declared that he has not "got the time to respond to tweets from Donald Trump".

Trump's sons, Donald Jr. and Eric Trump, defended his comments and claimed that Khan, who worked along with the security services and held a vigil for victims of the attack, was not doing enough to combat terrorism. Trump Jr. stated that Khan should stop attacking his father, despite the fact that Khan did not respond to Trump's comments.

Senator John McCain criticized the comments made by Trump, stating that America was "not showing leadership around the world." During the same discussion, McCain also commented that the former president Barack Obama and his administration had offered better leadership. He later partially retracted by stating that only certain "different aspects" were better during Obama's presidency, but still stood by his criticism of Trump's social media views.

=== Comments on Morning Joe hosts ===
Avatar of Donald J. Trump

Donald J. Trump
(@realDonaldTrump)
tweeted:

I heard poorly rated @Morning_Joe speaks badly of me (don't watch anymore). Then how come low I.Q. Crazy Mika, along with Psycho Joe, came..

June 29, 2017

Avatar of Donald J. Trump

Donald J. Trump
(@realDonaldTrump)
tweeted:

...to Mar-a-Lago 3 nights in a row around New Year's Eve, and insisted on joining me. She was bleeding badly from a face-lift. I said no!

June 29, 2017

On June 29, 2017, Trump tweeted about Morning Joe hosts Mika Brzezinski and Joe Scarborough, who earlier in the day had talked about Trump on their show. The tweets referred to the hosts as "low I.Q. Crazy Mika, along with Psycho Joe", and claimed that Brzezinski tried to join Trump on New Year's Eve but was declined because she was bleeding from a facelift.

The comments were quickly met with condemnation from both the left and the right. Paul Ryan, Speaker of the US House of Representatives, stated, "Obviously, I don't see that as an appropriate comment." Nancy Pelosi, Minority Leader of the House, stated that the tweet "really saddens me because it is so beneath the dignity of the president of the United States to engage in such behavior". Maine Republican Senator Susan Collins tweeted, "This has to stop – we all have a job – 3 branches of gov't and media. We don't have to get along, but we must show respect and civility." Rebukes also came from Oklahoma Republican senator James Lankford, New York Democratic representative Nita Lowey, and Kansas Republican representative Lynn Jenkins.

MSNBC stated, "It's a sad day for America when the president spends his time bullying, lying and spewing petty personal attacks instead of doing his job." Aaron Blake of The Washington Post wrote an article titled "Trump's very bad tweets about Mika Brzezinski are a microcosm of his struggling presidency."

Seemingly in defense of Trump, Melania Trump's spokeswoman Stephanie Grisham released the statement: "As the First Lady has stated publicly in the past, when her husband gets attacked, he will punch back 10 times harder." Sarah Huckabee Sanders stated, "Look, I don't think that the president's ever been someone who gets attacked and doesn't push back. ... This is a president who fights fire with fire and certainly will not be allowed to be bullied by liberal media and the liberal elites in Hollywood or anywhere else."

On July 1, 2017, Trump tweeted "Crazy Joe Scarborough and dumb as a rock Mika are not bad people, but their low rated show is dominated by their NBC bosses. Too bad!"

After these tweets, Trump's approval rating decreased from 40 percent to 37 percent, according to a Gallup poll. However, the RealClearPolitics average of polls showed his approval rating remained virtually unchanged in the same time period.

=== Joe Scarborough smear ===
Avatar of Donald J. Trump

Donald J. Trump
(@realDonaldTrump)
tweeted:

When will they open a Cold Case on the Psycho Joe Scarborough matter in Florida. Did he get away with murder? Some people think so. Why did he leave Congress so quietly and quickly? Isn't it obvious? What's happening now? A total nut job!

May 12, 2020

Trump repeatedly used Twitter to smear Scarborough by falsely suggesting that he was involved in the 2001 death of Lori Klausutis, who had been one of Scarborough's congressional aides. Klausutis died in Scarborough's district office in Fort Walton Beach, Florida, after she fainted and hit her head; the medical examiner's autopsy revealed that she had had an undiagnosed heart condition that caused the death, which occurred when Scarborough was in Washington, and there was no evidence of any foul play. In 2017, Trump suggested that Scarborough to be fired "based on the 'unsolved mystery' that took place in Florida years ago" and wrote "Investigate!" In a series of tweets in May 2020, Trump called Scarborough a "psycho" and again suggested that he had murdered Klausutis.

Twitter refused to delete the tweet, despite a request from Timothy Klausutis, Lori's widower, who in May 2020 wrote a letter to Twitter CEO Jack Dorsey (subsequently published by The New York Times), calling upon Twitter to remove Trump's tweets. Klausutis pointed out that "an ordinary user like me would be banished from the platform for such a tweet" and wrote, "These conspiracy theorists, including most recently the President of the United States, continue to spread their bile and misinformation on your platform disparaging the memory of my wife and our marriage. ... the President of the United States has taken something that does not belong to him — the memory of my dead wife — and perverted it for perceived political gain." Trump's promotion of the debunked conspiracy drew rare rebukes from some Republican officials such as Adam Kinzinger, Liz Cheney, and Mitt Romney. as well as some conservative media outlets, including The Wall Street Journal and the Washington Examiner.

=== Attacks on federal judges, officials, departments and FBI ===
As president, Trump frequently tweeted personal attacks against federal judges who have ruled against him in court cases. In February 2017, Trump referred to US district judge James Robart, who had enjoined Trump's travel ban from taking effect, as a "so-called judge" and wrote, "If something happens blame him and court system. People pouring in. Bad!" Legal experts expressed concerns that such comments undermined the federal judiciary and could "undermine public confidence in an institution capable checking his power."

In June 2017, Trump criticized his own United States Department of Justice for defending his "watered down, politically correct version" of a travel ban (which Trump signed in March 2017) in court, rather than an initial version of the ban that Trump has signed in January 2017 (and was later declared unconstitutional by federal courts). In January 2018, Trump tweeted that his Justice Department is part of the American "deep state". In March 2018, Trump tweeted that "there was tremendous leaking, lying and corruption at the highest levels of the FBI, Justice & State" Departments. Previously in December 2017, Trump tweeted that the FBI's "reputation" was at its worst ever after years under James Comey.

In June 2017, Trump tweeted that Deputy Attorney General Rod Rosenstein's investigation of Trump (via a special counsel Robert Mueller) was a "witch hunt". In March 2018, Trump reiterated that the "Mueller probe should never have been started" and was a "WITCH HUNT!"

Trump has tweeted disapproval of Attorney General Jeff Sessions on various occasions.

In October 2017, Trump tweeted that Secretary of State Rex Tillerson was "wasting his time trying to negotiate with" North Korean leader Kim Jong-un. In March 2018, Trump fired Tillerson via a tweet.

In February 2018, after National Security Advisor H. R. McMaster said there was "incontrovertible" evidence that Russia had interfered in the 2016 election, Trump tweeted that McMaster "forgot to say" that the Russians had colluded with the Democrats and that the Russians had not impacted the election results.

=== Comments on the Squad ===
On July 14, 2019, Trump tweeted that certain Democratic congresswomen—freshmen representatives Alexandria Ocasio-Cortez, Rashida Tlaib, Ayanna Pressley, and Ilhan Omar, an informal grouping known as "the Squad", all of whom have been critical of Trump—should "go back and help fix the totally broken and crime infested places from which they came" rather than criticize the American government. Trump's tweet was widely described as racist.

Ocasio-Cortez, Tlaib, and Pressley are all native-born citizens of the United States, and Omar has been a naturalized citizen since 2000. Trump's "go back" Tweet was an example of false attribution of foreignness. House speaker Nancy Pelosi described Trump's tweets as xenophobic. Several Republican senators and representatives condemned Trump's tweets as xenophobic and not representative of the party's values and requested that he disavow them. Two days after Trump's tweet, the House of Representatives voted 240–187 to condemn Trump's "racist comments"; all Democrats voted to pass the resolution of condemnation, but only 4 of the 197 House Republicans joined them. Many white nationalists/white supremacists praised Trump's tweet. Commentators pointed out that during the campaign, Trump had criticized America in far stronger terms than those now used by Squad members. Trump's remarks were condemned by many world leaders including Canadian prime minister Justin Trudeau (who said that the comments were "hurtful, wrong and completely unacceptable"), German chancellor Angela Merkel (who expressed "solidarity with the attacked women"), and president of the European Council Donald Tusk ("sometimes if you feel that something is totally unacceptable you have to react despite business, despite interests").

Trump denied that his tweets were racist and did not apologize for his remarks, saying at a White House press conference, "If somebody has a problem with our country, if someone doesn't want to be in our country, they should leave."

In August 2019, Trump tweeted that Omar and Tlaib resolutely "hate Israel & all Jewish people", and that Israel permitting them to visit the country would "show great weakness". Less than two hours later, Israel blocked the entry of Omar and Tlaib, which was a reversal from statements made in July 2019 by Israeli Ambassador to the United States Ron Dermer. Spokesmen for Israeli ministers did not cite Trump as contributing to the blockage. Trump applauded Israel's decision while continuing his criticism of Omar and Tlaib; he described them as "the face of the Democrat Party, and they HATE Israel".

=== Jeffrey Epstein conspiracy theory ===
In August 2019, after the death of Jeffrey Epstein, Trump retweeted a video from right-wing comedian Terrence K. Williams that baselessly accused the Clintons of murdering Epstein. Trump's promotion of false conspiracy theories was condemned; US senator Cory Booker of New Jersey, then a candidate for the Democratic presidential nomination, warned that Trump's "whipping people into anger" could lead to violence. Trump defended the retweet, calling Williams "a highly respected conservative pundit" and then repeated his suggestion that the Clintons might have murdered Epstein.

=== "Liberate" ===
During the COVID-19 pandemic, several people protested the lockdowns and demanded that states be reopened. On April 17, Trump tweeted calling for the "liberation" of Michigan, Minnesota, and Virginia in all caps. The tweets were widely criticized and "Liberate America" soon trended on Twitter after Trump's remarks.

=== Unlicensed Linkin Park song ===
In July 2020, Linkin Park issued a cease and desist letter to Donald Trump for retweeting a campaign video that featured an unlicensed song. Twitter soon disabled the video.

=== Calling Trending section illegal ===
Avatar of Donald J. Trump

Donald J. Trump
(@realDonaldTrump)
tweeted:

So disgusting to watch Twitter's so-called "Trending", where sooo many trends are about me, and never a good one. They look for anything they can find, make it as bad as possible, and blow it up, trying to make it trend. Really ridiculous, illegal, and, of course, very unfair!

July 27, 2020

On July 27, 2020, Trump criticized the Twitter Trending section for spreading trends that negatively portrayed him, calling it "really ridiculous, illegal, and, of course, very unfair!" Many Twitter users condemned this tweet, claiming that users were simply exercising First Amendment rights. In response to the tweet, "#TrumpleThinSkin" and "#ThePresidentIsACrybaby" became trending hashtags in the United States.

=== Illegal immigrants ===
In an effort to press his campaign for the border wall between the US and Mexico, Trump repeatedly posted tweets seeking "to paint a portrait of widespread criminal conduct by undocumented immigrants." His tweets on illegal immigration contained nonsensical and exaggerated figures, and lacked significant context. For example, in January 2019, Trump complained that "the cost of illegal immigration" for the four weeks of the year "is $18,959,495,168" and that the "at least 25,772,342 illegal aliens" were in the US; neither claim was accurate, and the administration did not respond to requests to explain these figures. In other tweets, Trump exaggerated the percentage of federal prison inmates who were unauthorized immigrants and the number of the illegal border-crossings (which had been declining for almost 20 years by the time Trump took office). Trump also seized upon high-profile crimes committed by illegal immigrants, such as Wilbur Ernesto Martinez-Guzman, Gustavo Arriaga Perez, and Cristhian Bahena Rivera.

=== American suburbs ===
On July 23, 2020, Trump tweeted that the "suburban housewives of America" must read an article from the New York Post, claiming that his Democratic rival Joe Biden would "destroy your neighborhood and the American dream" if elected.

Also in July 2020, the Trump administration had made changes to the Affirmatively Furthering Fair Housing implemented by the Obama administration. This act mandated local communities to fix any prejudices regarding building low-income housing before receiving federal funds. Trump tweeted that "people living their Suburban Lifestyle Dream" would "no longer be bothered" by low-income housing being built in their communities.

=== Spread of COVID-19 misinformation ===
On October 5, 2020, Trump tweeted that he would be leaving Walter Reed Army Medical Center, 3 days after being admitted after testing positive for COVID-19, writing "Don't be afraid of Covid. Don't let it dominate your life. We have developed, under the Trump Administration, some really great drugs & knowledge. I feel better than I did 20 years ago!" Trump's tweet undermined public health messaging and encouraged followers to disregard recommendations to prevent the spread of COVID-19. Scientific, medical, public health, and ethical experts, pandemic survivors, and the families those killed by COVID-19 expressed horror and dismay at Trump's attempt to downplay the COVID-19 pandemic in the United States, which at the time of Trump's tweet had killed at least 210,000 Americans.

In Twitter and Facebook posts early the next morning, Trump falsely claimed that seasonal flu was more lethal than COVID-19; Twitter placed a warning message over the tweet, while Facebook deleted it entirely, based on the sites' policies against the spread of COVID-19 misinformation. Several hours later, Trump reacted by tweeting: "REPEAL SECTION 230!!!"—a reference to section 230 of Title 47 of the US Code, which immunizes technology companies from liability for moderation decisions.

== Other notable tweets ==
=== Announcing positive test for COVID ===
Trump's public statement in the form of a tweet announcing he tested positive for coronavirus was his most-liked tweet ever.

=== "Covfefe" ===
Avatar of Donald J. Trump

Donald J. Trump
(@realDonaldTrump)
tweeted:

Despite the constant negative press covfefe

May 30, 2017 (Note: The "covfefe" tweets are, in chronological order: Trump, Donald J. [@realDonaldTrump] (May 31, 2017). "Despite the constant negative press covfefe" (Tweet). Archived from the original on May 31, 2017 – via Twitter.; Trump, Donald J. [@realDonaldTrump] (May 31, 2017). "Who can figure out the true meaning of "covfefe" ??? Enjoy!" (Tweet). Archived from the original on January 7, 2021 – via Twitter.)

The COVFEFE Act

On May 31, 2017, Trump sent a tweet that read, in its entirety, "Despite the constant negative press covfefe". It immediately went viral as an Internet meme and a source of jokes. It got over 127,000 retweets and 162,000 likes, making it one of Trump's most popular tweets in months. Six hours later, Trump deleted it and issued a new tweet asking what people thought covfefe might mean. The Independent later speculated that covfefe was a typo for coverage.

Off-camera, at a press briefing later the same day, White House press secretary Sean Spicer explained that "the president and a small group of people know exactly what he meant". No further explanation was given during the briefing. Some reporters said that Spicer did not appear to be joking. Conservative columnist Jonah Goldberg suggested in the National Review that "Spicer feels compelled to protect the myth of Trumpian infallibility at all costs". The Atlantic's Megan Garber felt that Spicer's response further divided the White House from the public by unnecessarily creating a "whiff of conspiracy" around a likely typo. At The Washington Post, Callum Borchers argued that Spicer's response had been deliberately obscure to distract the public from other controversies.

Leonid Bershidsky, writing for Bloomberg View, compared the phenomenon to President Ronald Reagan's joke on a live microphone, "We begin bombing in five minutes." Bill Coffin of Compliance Week compared the two incidents: "In Reagan's case, he immediately admitted the error and squashed it. In Trump's case, he sent a wrong message and then allowed it to sit for hours untended."

About a year later, on May 17, 2018, Trump jokingly said "I hear covfefe" in response to the Yanny or Laurel meme.

== First impeachment ==
Trump made several controversial tweets during his impeachment inquiry, first impeachment by the House (December 2019), and first Senate trial and acquittal (February 2020).

=== "Civil War" tweet ===
In a late September 2019 tweet, Trump controversially quoted Texas pastor Robert Jeffress, who stated that if Trump was removed from office, it would cause a "Civil War like fracture, from which this country would never heal". His comments were criticized by Senator Kamala Harris (Democrat of California), who urged Twitter to suspend Trump's account, and Representative Adam Kinzinger (Republican of Illinois), who called it "beyond repugnant." Harvard Law School professor John Coates argued that "a sitting president threatening civil war if Congress exercises its constitutionally authorized power" constituted an independent ground for impeachment. Mary B. McCord of Georgetown University Law School, a former Justice Department national security official, said that armed militia-movement groups were likely to take Trump's "civil war" tweets seriously. #CivilWar2 trended on Twitter soon after Trump's tweet.

=== Threats against Representative Adam Schiff and whistleblower ===
Trump repeatedly used Twitter to attack and threaten US representative Adam Schiff, the chairman of the House Intelligence Committee, who led the investigation into the Trump–Ukraine scandal and served as the lead House impeachment manager during Trump's Senate trial. In a September 30, 2019, tweet, Trump suggested that Schiff be arrested for treason. In a January 26, 2020, tweet, during his Senate trial, Trump called Schiff "a CORRUPT POLITICIAN, and probably a very sick man" who "has not paid the price, yet, for what he has done to our Country!" When asked about the apparent veiled threat on Meet the Press, Schiff said he believed that Trump intended to threaten him and said that Trump was a "wrathful and vindictive president" who "wants to at least give the suggestion that the retribution should be of a kind other than at the ballot box."

Trump also repeatedly used Twitter to attack and threaten the whistleblower who submitted a report to the Intelligence Community inspector general about Trump's conduct; Trump also used Twitter to spread conspiracy theories about the whistleblower. In December 2019, Trump retweeted a link to an unconfirmed Washington Examiner story that purported to identify the whistleblower, although whistle-blowers' identifies are protected by federal law. Trump was criticized for this.

=== Lynching ===
In late October 2019, Trump tweeted that the impeachment inquiry against him was "a lynching" and that he lacked "due process or fairness or any legal rights." The tweet, and especially its racially charged language, drew widespread backlash, with Democrats condemning the remarks and some Republicans issuing mild criticism. (House Minority Leader Kevin McCarthy called it "not the language I would use" and Senate Majority Leader Mitch McConnell called it an "unfortunate choice of words.") Some Republicans supported Trump's comparison to a "lynching" or defended his comments, such as Senator Lindsey Graham of South Carolina and Congressman Jim Jordan of Ohio.

== Blocking of Twitter users ==
The @realDonaldTrump account has blocked an unknown number of Twitter accounts from viewing his Twitter feed, including individuals such as Rosie O'Donnell, Anne Rice, Chrissy Teigen, Stephen King, Bess Kalb, Andy Signore, Angelo Carusone, Laura Packard and Daniel Dale, and organizations such as VoteVets.org.

In July 2017, a lawsuit was brought by the Knight First Amendment Institute at Columbia University in the US District Court for the Southern District of New York. The plaintiffs were seven Twitter users – Philip N. Cohen, Eugene Gu, Holly Figueroa O'Reilly, Nicholas Pappas, Joseph M. Papp, Rebecca Buckwalter-Poza, and Brandon Neely – whose accounts had been blocked by Trump's personal Twitter account, alleging that the @realDonaldTrump account constitutes a public forum. The lawsuit argued that blocking access to the @realDonaldTrump account is a violation of constitutional rights and a violation of the plaintiff's First Amendment rights. The lawsuit also named as defendants White House press secretary Sean Spicer and social media director Dan Scavino.

In 2018, Judge Naomi Reice Buchwald ruled that the plaintiffs "were indisputably blocked as a result of viewpoint discrimination"; that elements of @realDonaldTrump constitute a public forum; and that viewpoint discrimination in those elements that are public forums violated the First Amendment. After this ruling, the 7 Twitter users that were a part of the lawsuit were unblocked. In August, the Knight First Amendment Institute sent a letter to the US Justice Department requesting that the president comply with the judge's ruling and unblock a list of 41 additional Twitter users, including Danny Zuker, MoveOn activist Jordan Uhl, health care activist Laura Packard, and journalists like Alex Kotch and Jules Suzdaltsev. Those users were then unblocked by @realDonaldTrump.

In 2019, the Second Circuit upheld Buchwald's ruling, stating that because Trump has conducted official government business over Twitter, he cannot block Americans from the account based on viewpoint.

In July 2020, The Knight First Amendment Institute at Columbia University sued Donald Trump again, on behalf of users that were blocked before Trump's inauguration, or who were not able to identify which tweet prompted Trump to block them.

Trump petitioned the Supreme Court in August 2020 to hear his appeal of the Second Circuit's decision to uphold Judge Buchwald's opinion. Trump's petition requested the Supreme Court to answer the question "Whether the First Amendment deprives a government official of his right to control his personal Twitter account by blocking third-party accounts if he uses that personal account in part to announce official actions and policies." Post-election, this case is still pending before the Supreme Court.

== Effects on litigation ==
Trump's statements in tweets have been cited in court challenges against his actions as president; his Twitter posts on Muslims have been significant in legal challenges to Executive Order 13769 (which Trump has called a "travel ban"), as courts have considered Trump's statements in their assessments of the motivations and purpose of the order. In 2017, Trump's tweets were cited by both the US Court of Appeals for the Fourth Circuit and the US Court of Appeals for the Ninth Circuit, which upheld rulings blocking Trump's executive order as unconstitutional. In its opinion, the Fourth Circuit cited the "backdrop of public statements by the President and his advisers and representatives" as evidence that the order "drips with religious intolerance, animus, and discrimination"; the Ninth Circuit wrote that "throughout these judicial proceedings, the president has continued to make generalized, often inflammatory, statements about the Muslim faith and its adherents," including through Tweets. Peter J. Spiro, a legal scholar at Temple University, noted that Trump's November 2017 tweets of anti-Muslim videos would almost certainly be cited by challengers to Trump's third version of a travel ban as evidence that the orders were unconstitutionally motivated by anti-Muslim animus.

Trump's tweets were also cited by the US District Court for the District of Columbia in its ruling in Jane Doe v. Trump issuing a preliminary injunction blocking Trump's ban on service by transgender people in the military from going into effect. The court determined that Trump's sudden policy announcement on Twitter comment undermined his claim that the ban was motivated by genuine concern for military efficiency. The court wrote:

[Trump] abruptly announced, via Twitter – without any of the formality or deliberative processes that generally accompany the development and announcement of major policy changes that will gravely affect the lives of many Americans – that all transgender individuals would be precluded from participating in the military in any capacity. These circumstances provide additional support for Plaintiffs' claim that the decision to exclude transgender individuals was not driven by genuine concerns regarding military efficacy.

== Effects on the stock market ==
Avatar of Donald J. Trump

Donald J. Trump
(@realDonaldTrump)
tweeted:

Don't buy GOODYEAR TIRES – They announced a BAN ON MAGA HATS. Get better tires for far less! (This is what the Radical Left Democrats do. Two can play the same game, and we have to start playing it now!).

August 19, 2020

On December 22, 2016, Trump posted: "Based on the tremendous cost and cost overruns of the Lockheed Martin F-35, I have asked Boeing to price-out a comparable F-18 Super Hornet!" After this post, the stock price of Lockheed Martin dropped significantly and the stock price of Boeing increased slightly. Another example is the on August 17, 2017, post on Amazon: "Amazon is doing great damage to tax paying retailers. Towns, cities and states throughout the U.S. are being hurt – many jobs being lost!" Afterwards, the market capitalization of Amazon declined by $6 billion. However, there are also contrary examples: The New York Times stock remained stable or even rose when Trump posted about 'failing The New York Times.'

On August 19, 2020, Trump called for a boycott for Goodyear Tires on Twitter after an image of a Goodyear employee training leaked displaying a slide showing that "Black Lives Matter" and LGBT gear are allowed to be worn, however, "Blue Lives Matter" and "MAGA" gear are not allowed to be worn. Goodyear stock fell six percent shortly after the tweet. In addition, stocks from several of Goodyear's rivals, such as Bridgestone, gained value. Goodyear later released a statement stating that the Goodyear corporation did not create the slide and asked all employees to remain apolitical.

== Deletions ==
While the National Archives and Records Administration has recommended archiving all social media postings to comply with the Presidential Records Act, the Trump administration has deleted multiple public posts. In June 2017, the watchdog group CREW and the National Security Archive filed suit against Trump, contending that deletion of tweets is the destruction of presidential records in violation of the Presidential Records Act of 1981.

Following Alabama senator Luther Strange's loss to Justice Roy Moore in the September 2017 primary for the Senate special election, Trump deleted at least two tweets previously posted in support of Strange. In November 2017, following criticism from the office of the British Prime Minister regarding Trump's retweeting of several videos from far-right British nationalist group Britain First (see § Britain First videos), Trump tweeted at Twitter user @theresamay, while presumably intending to target @theresa_may; Trump later deleted the original tweet, and sent a new tweet targeting @theresa_may with the same content.

== Cautions ==
Under its "civic integrity" policy created in 2018 and expanded in May 2020, Twitter scrutinizes statements that may affect participation in democracy. Twitter has invited certain nonprofits to flag problematic tweets in this subject area. Twitter also announced on May 11 that it would begin to flag "misleading information." In November 2020, Twitter clarified that, while it may choose to merely flag the offensive tweets of "current world leaders and candidates for office," when those people leave office and become "private citizens" again, they will be treated like everyone else and their accounts can be suspended.

=== "Get the facts about mail-in ballots" ===
Twitter placed a fact-check advisory on Trump's tweets for the first time on May 26, 2020. That morning, in two tweets, Trump alleged that mail-in ballots would be "substantially fraudulent," resulting in a "Rigged Election." Hours later, Twitter placed an exclamation-point icon on each of these tweets with the text "Get the facts about mail-in ballots," linking to a page that said that Trump's allegations of fraud were "unsubstantiated". This type of fact-checking moderation had been introduced earlier in response to misinformation spread during the COVID-19 pandemic to help Twitter users get correct information, and was the first time Twitter staff opted to use it on Trump's tweets.

In response, on May 28, Trump signed an executive order challenging the liability protections currently given to social media platforms. Section 230 of the Communications Decency Act, sometimes referred to as "the 26 words that created the internet", treats social media companies as "platforms" rather than "publishers" and thereby reduces their responsibility for what their users say. Trump sought to increase the legal responsibility of social media companies for what their users say, thereby exposing them to lawsuits. Experts challenged the legality of many sections of the executive order as running afoul of the First Amendment, as well as making demands of independent agencies of the United States government that are statutorily outside presidential control.

=== "Glorifying violence" ===
Avatar of Donald J. Trump

Donald J. Trump
(@realDonaldTrump)
tweeted:

Replying to @realDonaldTrump

....These THUGS are dishonoring the memory of George Floyd, and I won't let that happen. Just spoke to Governor Tim Walz and told him that the Military is with him all the way. Any difficulty and we will assume control but, when the looting starts, the shooting starts. Thank you!

May 29, 2020

Protests broke out in Minneapolis and throughout the United States after the May 25 murder of George Floyd, an African-American man, by Derek Chauvin, a white Minneapolis police officer. Trump, in both Twitter and Facebook posts in the late evening on May 28, said he had talked to Minnesota governor Tim Walz about bringing the National Guard to help secure the city. He said the government was prepared to "assume control." "When the looting starts, the shooting starts," Trump warned, using a phrase made infamous by Miami Police Chief Walter E. Headley in 1967 that was believed to have inflamed violence in that city. Twitter decided to mark the tweet with a "public interest notice" deeming it as "glorifying violence"; they acknowledged they could have removed the tweet entirely but maintained that "it is important that the public still be able to see the Tweet given its relevance to ongoing matters of public importance." Facebook opted to take no action about the equivalent post made on its platform; CEO Mark Zuckerberg said that this message and similar ones did not violate Facebook's acceptable use policies. Journalists and civil rights leaders criticized the company's standards, and Facebook employees staged a virtual walkout on June 1 to demand that management deal with Trump's posts.

Several days later the White House Twitter account posted a series of videos falsely accusing antifa groups of placing bricks on sidewalks in order to instigate violence during the protests, including one which falsely suggested a barrier situated outside a synagogue in Sherman Oaks, California, to prevent anti-Semitic attacks had been placed on the street by terrorists. Trump also used Twitter to share a letter by his former legal advisor John M. Dowd, which described peaceful protesters in Washington, DC, as "terrorists".

A tweet posted by Trump's reelection campaign on June 3, 2020 (as well as posted to other social media sites), in the wake of the Floyd protests had included a video with several segments of Trump speaking about Floyd's murder, along with several other images. Twitter was forced to remove the video after it had received a Digital Millennium Copyright Act (DMCA) takedown request for one of the images used in the video though it was unclear to journalists which image this was. Trump called out the action as "illegal" in a following tweet but Jack Dorsey of Twitter reiterated that they had to follow the DMCA in removing the video.

=== "Manipulated media" ===
On June 18, 2020, Trump tweeted a satirical video with the CNN logo and the chyron caption "Terrified todler [sic] runs from racist baby; racist baby probably a Trump voter." The implication was that news organizations unfairly malign white people and conservatives. CNN had never run that caption. Twitter applied a fact-check advisory with the words "manipulated media."

=== "Abusive behavior" ===
On June 23, 2020, Trump tweeted that protesters "will be met with serious force." Twitter applied a warning that the comment "violated the Twitter Rules about abusive behavior."

=== "Misleading health claims" ===
On August 23, 2020, Trump tweeted that "Mail Drop Boxes...are not Covid sanitized." He claimed that the Democratic Party was "using" mailboxes despite alleged "voter security" and "fraud" problems with postal voting; he claimed that voting by mail enables "a person to vote multiple times," and he questioned "who controls" mailboxes. Twitter applied a warning that the comment violated "our Civic Integrity Policy for making misleading health claims that could potentially dissuade people from participation in voting."

=== "Misleading about an election" ===
Twitter applied a warning to over a third of Trump's tweets made between election night 2020 (November 3) and his rival Joe Biden's victory speech (November 7), stating: "some or all of the content shared in this Tweet is disputed and might be misleading about an election or other civic process." Twitter then said it would no longer use this election-specific flag given that the election had already been decided.

== Suspensions and deactivations ==
=== 2017 ===
Trump's personal Twitter account was deactivated for eleven minutes on November 2, 2017. The official @POTUS account remained online during the period that the personal account was taken offline. In a tweet the next day, Trump referred to Bahtiyar Duysak, who deactivated the account on his last day of work at Twitter before returning to his home country of Germany, as a "rogue employee." Twitter responded by adding protection to Trump's account.

=== 2021 ===
On January 6, 2021, shortly after Trump uploaded a video message in which he repeated the false claims that the presidential election had been stolen, the video was removed by Twitter, Facebook, and YouTube for violating site policies on "civil integrity" and election misinformation. Facebook executive Guy Rosen said the video was removed because "it contributes to rather than diminishes the risk of ongoing violence." Twitter locked Trump's account for twelve hours and threatened a permanent suspension for "repeated and severe violations of our Civic Integrity policy." Twitter also required him to remove three of his tweets. He was warned his account would be terminated if he continued to make posts they deemed as inciting violence, or spread conspiracy theories about election integrity (false claims which were said to be fuelling the violence). His account was unlocked, and he tweeted three more times from it. Snapchat indefinitely suspended Trump's account on the platform the same day, while Shopify terminated shops that sold Trump campaign paraphernalia and merchandise from his personal TrumpStore brand.

The following day, Facebook and its platforms, including Instagram, announced they had banned Trump indefinitely, at least until the end of his presidential term. Facebook CEO Mark Zuckerberg wrote, "The shocking events of the last 24 hours clearly demonstrate that President Donald Trump intends to use his remaining time in office to undermine the peaceful and lawful transition of power to his elected successor." On January 7, Twitch announced it had disabled Trump's channel on the platform. TikTok announced it would restrict videos of the Capitol attack and Trump's January 6 address, other than those providing factual information, criticism or journalistic value. Pinterest began limiting hashtags related to pro-Trump topics such as #StopTheSteal since around the November election.

On January 12, YouTube announced that it had temporarily banned Trump's channel for seven days, restricting it from uploading any new videos or live-streams. YouTube said the decision came after the president violated the platform's policies by posting content that incited violence. All the previous content on the channel was removed. YouTube also said that the ban could be extended.

A Zignal Labs analysis determined that in the week after several social media sites (Twitter, Facebook, Instagram, Snapchat, Twitch, Spotify, Shopify, and others) suspended Trump's and key allies' accounts, online misinformation about election fraud plunged 73 percent, dropping from 2.5 million mentions to 688,000 mentions.

=== Reactions to suspension ===
Civil rights groups said that Trump's Twitter and Facebook bans were "long overdue" and that social media companies had excessively delayed in taking steps to counter political violence. The co-CEO of the civil rights and advocacy group Free Press said the bans were "a day late and a dollar short" but welcomed the move. Many Democratic officials welcomed the ban. Yaël Eisenstat, a former CIA officer who previously worked on election policy at Facebook, said: "I'm not going to applaud the move now when it is politically the most obvious, easy and – let's be frank – good business decision. Inciting your followers to engage in insurrection is a high form of treason and allowing your platform to be used for that purpose makes you complicit." The ban was also criticised by many US officials supportive of Trump, with Republican senator Ted Cruz stating the ban was "absurd and profoundly dangerous", and former United States Ambassador to the United Nations Nikki Haley likening the ban to political censorship in China.

A survey of Americans taken after the Capitol attack and Twitter's permanent suspension of Trump's account showed that 61 percent agreed with the decision to ban Trump, while 39 percent were opposed. Support was sharply split by party: 80 percent of Democrats, 59 percent of independents, and 36 percent of Republicans supported the ban. Of those surveyed, 58 percent agreed with the statement "President Trump's actions this week were dangerous and removing him from Twitter was the correct thing to do", while 42 percent agreed with the statement "I am concerned that Twitter permanently suspending President Trump sets a dangerous precedent with technology companies censoring free speech and government officials."

Some foreign leaders criticized Twitter's ban of Trump. A spokesman for German chancellor Angela Merkel said that Twitter was correct to flag false statements in Trump's posts, but that she viewed the permanent suspension as "problematic" due to her view that restrictions on the "right to freedom of opinion" should be decided by governments rather than private companies. Mexican president Andrés Manuel López Obrador blasted the decision to ban Trump, saying that he favored prohibiting private companies from banning government officials and had directed officials to explore the possibility of creating a Mexican state-run social network; López Obrador compared such action by websites to the "Spanish Inquisition" while Polish prime minister Mateusz Morawiecki said that Poland's conservative government planned to introduce a bill to limit how social media companies could moderate content. However, Margrethe Vestager, the executive vice president of the European Commission for a Europe Fit for the Digital Age, suggested that the bans were justifiable, saying: "This is, of course, the most extreme of extreme situations, that the president of the United States is inciting people to go toward Congress. So I completely accept that this is an extreme situation, and lines have been crossed."

According to the South China Morning Post, Chinese state media commentators and academics have also criticized Trump being banned from social media platforms, calling the bans "a cautionary tale of social media platforms wielding too much power" and have also claimed "that the ban hypocritically goes against US advocacy of free speech."

== Satire and memes ==
In June 2017, the satirical news program The Daily Show and its network, Comedy Central, set up a temporary museum space on West 57th Street, next to Trump Tower in Manhattan, that was dedicated to Trump's tweets.

In January 2019, Trump served hamburgers to the Clemson Tigers champion football team due to the White House's catering staff being furloughed during the federal government shutdown of 2018–2019. His misspelling on Twitter of hamburger as "hamberder" was ridiculed on the internet. It soon became a meme as well, and was parodied on Saturday Night Live with Trump (played by Alec Baldwin) competing for "hamberders" on the Deal or No Deal game show.

== Archival ==
In June 2017, Democratic US representative Mike Quigley filed legislation in the United States House of Representatives, titled the Communications Over Various Feeds Electronically for Engagement (COVFEFE) Act (H.R. 2883), to Presidential Records Act to cover social media, thus requiring tweets and other social media posts by the US president to be preserved under law and stored by the National Archives. The bill did not advance in committee and died at the end of the 115th Congress.

Regardless of the failure of the bill, the National Archives confirmed that Trump's tweets are considered presidential records. However, as of August 20, 2024, they were not available on the webpage regarding archived social media at the National Archives website, trumplibrary.gov. The page contains the statement, "A number of Trump administration officials, including President Trump, used personal accounts when conducting government business. The National Archives will make the social media content from those designated accounts publicly available as soon as possible."

== Reactions and analysis ==
Some commentators view Trump's tweets as having either the purpose or effect of distracting from issues. Such tweets are sometimes described as "shiny objects" intended to divert attention from other news. Dan Mahaffee of the Center for the Study of the Presidency and Congress opined that Trump's tweets distracted from pressing national issues, writing that to dismiss Trump's tweets "as intemperate outbursts or merely stream-of-consciousness responses to current events would thus greatly underestimate their impact and reach" and opining that Trump's tweets elevated "the trivial at the expense of the consequential." Financial Times columnist Courtney Weaver viewed Trump's Twitter attacks against NFL players kneeling during the national anthem as "weapons of mass distraction" that diverted attention from the humanitarian crisis in Puerto Rico following Hurricane Maria, and wrote that "The more time that is spent discussing the president's latest stand-off with the NFL, the less time is spent discussing the Republicans' latest failed efforts to repeal and replace Obamacare, and other administration shortcomings." Analyst Philip Bump of The Washington Post views Trump's Tweets as attempts to distract in times of unfavorable news related to the investigation by special counsel Robert S. Mueller III.

A 2020 study published in Nature Communications assessed Trump's tweets in the context of agenda-setting theory, analyzing the hypothesis that Trump uses tweets strategically to divert the attention of the media and the public from issues and topics he considers to be potentially threatening or harmful to him. The research found that increased media coverage of Russian interference in the 2016 election and the Mueller investigation was "immediately followed by Trump tweeting increasingly about unrelated issues" which led to "a reduction in coverage of the Mueller investigation," providing support for the diversionary hypothesis. The research found that this pattern was "absent in placebo analyses involving Brexit coverage and several other topics that do not present a political risk to the president" and that the finding was "robust to the inclusion of numerous control variables and examination of several alternative explanations, although the generality of the successful diversion must be established by further investigation."

Essayist Frank Rich of New York magazine argued in 2017 that Trump's tweets are not purely distractions, but rather (1) are frequently news in themselves; (2) indicate a heightened instability within the Trump administration; and (3) are not aimed at news consumers, but rather "are intended to rally his base" of supporters.

In a February 2021 analysis, Michael Humphrey, a journalism and communications professor at Colorado State University, wrote that Trump's tweets were characterized by an emphasis on storytelling and "re-scripting" the world, and were based on five themes: "The true version of the United States is beset with invaders"; "Real Americans can see this"; "I (Trump) am uniquely qualified to stop this invasion"; "The establishment and its agents are hindering me"; and "The U.S. is in mortal danger because of this." Because these elements were flexible, "the establishment" and "the invaders" could be anyone. Trump's tweets were also marked by contradiction: for example, he depicted China variously as a partner and then a foe.

=== SuspendThePres ===
SuspendThePres, also known as Will They Suspend Me?, is a Twitter account created by Bizzare Lazar. The account re-posted every tweet by Donald Trump. The account was suspended and flagged multiple times. There is also a SuspendThePres account on Facebook. The Twitter account was created back in 2015, but only started posting on May 29, 2020. The Facebook account was created on June 4. Less than three days after the Twitter account started, it was suspended for 12 hours. The account was suspended a second time for another 12 hours. One of the posts on the Facebook account was censored, but later restored.

== Suspension ==
Avatar of ((Twitter Safety))

((Twitter Safety))
(@TwitterSafety)
tweeted:

After close review of recent Tweets from the @realDonaldTrump account and the context around them we have permanently suspended the account due to the risk of further incitement of violence.

January 8, 2021

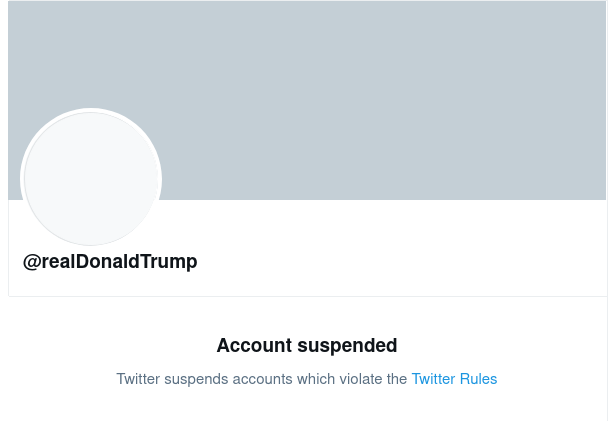
Trump's suspended account

Trump was indefinitely banned from Twitter on January 8, 2021, at 6:21 p.m. EST. According to Twitter, Trump was suspended "due to the risk of further incitement of violence" from his tweets, writing that specific tweets by Trump that "are likely to inspire others to replicate the violent acts that took place on January 6, 2021, and that there are multiple indicators that they are being received and understood as encouragement to do so." The company also noted: "Plans for future armed protests have already begun proliferating on and off-Twitter, including a proposed secondary attack on the US Capitol and state capitol buildings on January 17, 2021." Twitter's decision came after his account had been locked for 12-hour intervals twice and after he had had three of his tweets removed during the 2021 United States Capitol attack. The suspension caused Trump to lose over 88 million followers. In his final tweet before the permanent ban, Trump announced that he would not attend the inauguration of Joe Biden on January 20, 2021.

Twitter said it would not ban government accounts like @POTUS or @WhiteHouse, but would "take action to limit their use"; the company said that sock puppet accounts created for Trump in an attempt to evade the ban would be permanently suspended "at first detection". Trump attempted to circumvent the ban on January 8 by using the @POTUS account, but his posts were deleted within minutes. Trump also tried to circumvent the suspension by posting a statement on his official campaign Twitter account @TeamTrump, in which he complained about Twitter's suspension and accused the social media platform, without evidence, of colluding in a conspiracy with the Democratic Party and "the Radical Left" to get him banned, while repeating the rhetoric that first got him banned from his main Twitter account. This account was also suspended after the statement from Trump was posted. Twitter also suspended Trump campaign digital director Gary Coby's account after he forwarded his account information to Trump's deputy chief of staff, Dan Scavino, in an attempt to transfer it for Trump's use. Then-CEO of Twitter Jack Dorsey defended banning Trump on January 14, but also said it "sets a precedent I feel is dangerous".

The @POTUS account was transferred shortly before noon on January 20, 2021 to Biden and the follower count of @POTUS was reset.

Twitter CFO Ned Segal said in a February 2021 interview with CNN that the ban of the Twitter account is permanent, even if Trump runs for office again.

The CEOs of Alphabet, Twitter, and Facebook were set to appear before a House panel in March 2021 to be questioned about social media platforms' involvement in the US Capitol attack and their following decision to remove or ban Trump from their platforms. The hearing related to Section 230, a controversial law that gives large technology companies power to determine what information is allowed on their platforms.

Twitter suspended an account named "From the desk of Donald J. Trump" on May 6, 2021, which was also the name of a blog started by Trump the same week. Twitter ruled it a ban evasion.

Trump filed a class action lawsuit against Twitter and its CEO on July 7, 2021. He requested a preliminary injunction to force Twitter to reinstate his account on October 1, 2021. A hearing was held in the case Trump v. Twitter, in the US District Court for the Northern District of California, San Francisco in February 2022. Twitter requested at this hearing that the lawsuit be dismissed. Federal judge James Donato dismissed the case on May 6, 2022, citing a "failure to plausibly state a claim". Trump appealed to the US Court of Appeals for the Ninth Circuit, also in May. The case never made it to trial; Twitter settled with Trump for $10 million, on February 12, 2025.

Avatar of Elon Musk

Elon Musk
(@elonmusk)
tweeted:

Replying to @elonmusk

The people have spoken.

Trump will be reinstated.

Vox Populi, Vox Dei.

November 20, 2022

Elon Musk announced his planned acquisition of Twitter in April 2022, with observers speculating that Trump may have his account reinstated. The same day Twitter agreed to the acquisition, on April 25, Trump told Fox News he would not return to Twitter and would instead remain on his own social media platform, Truth Social. Musk told the Financial Times in a May 10 interview that he would lift Twitter's ban on Trump if his takeover was successful. A Truth Social federal securities filing on May 16 stated that it would have first dibs on any non-political posts by Trump for a period of six hours, after which Trump would be allowed to post the same content to other platforms like Twitter.

When Musk completed his acquisition of Twitter on October 27, Trump praised the closure and it appeared Musk was still considering reinstating Trump's account. On November 2, Musk tweeted that he would need "at least a few more weeks" to set a "clear process" for reinstating accounts. Musk then put the reinstatement up to a Twitter poll on November 18. The poll ran for 24 hours and ended with around 52% of over 15 million respondents voting "Yes" to reinstate Trump's account. Once the poll ended, Musk quote tweeting his poll to confirm that he would reinstate Trump's account, citing the Latin phrase Vox populi, vox Dei ("The voice of the people is the voice of God"). Trump's account was then reinstated, on November 19.

Trump's first tweet to Twitter (now called X) was made on August 24, 2023, appealing for campaign donations with a photo of his mugshot in the Georgia election racketeering prosecution. Trump did not tweet again until August 12, 2024, when he posted ahead of an interview with Elon Musk.

In February 2025, X settled with Trump in his lawsuit against the company for his suspension, paying him approximately $10 million.

== Warrant ==
In January 2023, special counsel Jack Smith obtained a search warrant for records of Trump's Twitter account activity in relation to the federal prosecution of Trump's alleged role in the January 6 United States Capitol attack. Twitter, which had been acquired by Elon Musk three months earlier, objected to a nondisclosure provision that prevented them from informing Trump about the search warrant. Because Twitter did not comply with the warrant by the deadline, a judge fined the company $350,000. In February 2023, Twitter complied with the warrant. However, in April 2023, prosecutors complained to the court that Twitter had provided only 32 direct messages. Twitter's appeals failed on January 16, 2024, at the U.S. Court of Appeals for the District of Columbia Circuit and on October 7, 2024, at the U.S. Supreme Court.
