= Zombie liberalism =

Political phrase

Zombie liberalism, or zombie neoliberalism, is a pejorative phrase used in left-wing politics to describe the current state of liberalism in general and neoliberalism in particular. According to users of the phrase, liberalism is like a zombie, in that it has "died", but "keeps stumbling on."

== Usage ==
The phrase "zombie liberalism" was used in a 2011 article in The Washington Post to describe liberalism as "half-dead, half-alive", citing examples of American liberalism's successes (such as the expansion of same-sex marriage in the United States) and failures (such as a rise in income inequality in the United States) in recent years. That same year, the phrase (as well as the similar phrase "the zombie of neoliberalism") was used in an article of The Guardian that described it as such: "Neoliberalism no longer 'makes sense', but its logic keeps stumbling on, without conscious direction, like a zombie: ugly, persistent and dangerous." The article goes on to describe the News International phone hacking scandal and other scandals as "symptoms not of renewal but rather of neoliberalism's zombie status. The scandals represent the zombie's body decomposing even as it continues its habitual operation."

In a 2016 article published in the progressive news website Common Dreams, British political activist George Monbiot called neoliberalism "The 'Zombie Doctrine' at the Root of All Our Problems" and elaborates that "when neoliberalism fell apart in 2008 there was … nothing. This is why the zombie walks. The left and centre have produced no new general framework of economic thought for 80 years." A 2017 article in Dissent published after the 2016 United States presidential election argued that Hillary Clinton's loss and the election of Donald Trump as part of neoliberalism's "collapse" and its "zombie existence now as an ideology and political project discredited but not displaced." A 2020 article in the New Statesman argues that the fate of the "liberal order" is "a kind of sustainable decadence, a zombie existence punctuated by periods of temporary crisis and alarm that continues indefinitely because all of its plausible rivals and inheritors have too many challenges and weaknesses of their own to effectively exploit its incompetence, torpor and stagnation."
