= Common Dreams =

American progressive news website

- Website type: News, political analysis, and commentary for the progressive community
- Headquarters: Portland, Maine
- Website: www.commondreams.org
- Commercial: No
- Registration: Optional
- Launched: 1997
- Current status: Active

Common Dreams NewsCenter, often referred to simply as Common Dreams, is a 501(c)(3) nonprofit, U.S.-based news website with a stated goal of serving the progressive community. Common Dreams publishes news stories, editorials, and a newswire of current, breaking news.

Common Dreams also re-publishes relevant content from other sources such as the Associated Press and has published writers such as Robert Reich and Molly Ivins. The website also provides links to other relevant columnists, periodicals, radio outlets, news services, and websites.

== History ==
Inspiration for the name, "Common Dreams", came from the book title, The Twilight of Common Dreams: Why America Is Wracked by Culture Wars, written by Todd Gitlin and published in 1995.

The nonprofit organization, Common Dreams, was founded in 1996 by political consultant Craig Brown, and the News Center was launched the following year, in May 1997, by Brown and his wife, Lina Newhouser (1951–2008). Brown, a native of Massachusetts, has a long history in progressive politics. He was the director of the Maine Public Interest Research Group from 1973 to 1977 and worked on the presidential campaigns of U.S. Senator Alan Cranston and U.S. Senator Paul Simon. Brown also served from 1990 to 1994 as chief of staff for Tom Andrews. Part of Brown's job was to compile news for Representative Andrews, which gave Brown the impetus to do the same on the internet.

During the Kosovo War, Common Dreams hosted the "Drumbeats of War" site which, according to the BBC, presented "a round-up of interesting articles with wide-ranging points of view that have previously appeared in newspapers and journals across the United States." Common Dreams is also known for its strong anti-war stance.

Common Dreams is funded through subscriptions and donations from its readers and does not have advertising.

== Featured authors ==
Common Dreams has featured original articles by the following authors:

- Eric Alterman
- Noam Chomsky
- Alexander Cockburn
- Jeff Cohen
- Juan Cole
- Joe Conason
- David Corn
- Linh Dinh
- Robert Fisk
- Amy Goodman
- Tom Hayden
- Bob Herbert
- Jim Hightower
- Arianna Huffington
- Molly Ivins
- Jesse Jackson
- Kathy Kelly
- Naomi Klein
- Paul Krugman
- Michael Lerner
- Michael Moore
- Ralph Nader
- Laura Packard
- Harold Pinter
- Ted Rall
- Robert Reich
- Frank Rich
- Arundhati Roy
- Jeffrey Sachs
- Bernie Sanders
- Robert Scheer
- Cindy Sheehan
- Katrina vanden Heuvel
- Howard Zinn

== See also ==
- List of anti-war organizations
