= List of United States presidential visits to the United Kingdom and Ireland =

An orthographic projection map featuring the United Kingdom and Ireland (highlighted in dark green)

Thirteen United States presidents have made presidential visits to the United Kingdom and Ireland; the first visit by an incumbent president to the United Kingdom was made in December 1918 by Woodrow Wilson, and was an offshoot of American diplomatic interactions with the Principal Allied Powers at the conclusion of World War I prior to the Paris Peace Conference. The first visit by an incumbent president to the island of Ireland was made in June 1963 by John F. Kennedy when he visited Ireland. To date, 43 visits have been made to the United Kingdom and 13 to Ireland.

The United States is bound together with both the island of Ireland and the island of Great Britain by shared history, an overlap in religion and a common language and legal system, plus kinship ties that reach back hundreds of years, including kindred, ancestral lines among Cornish Americans, English Americans, Manx Americans, Irish Americans, Scotch-Irish Americans, Scottish Americans, Welsh Americans, and American Britons respectively.

== Table of visits ==
President	Dates	Country	Locations	Key events
Woodrow Wilson	December 26–28, 1918	United Kingdom	London, Carlisle, Manchester	Met with King George V and Prime Minister David Lloyd George.
Harry S. Truman	August 2, 1945	United Kingdom	Plymouth	Informal meeting with King George VI.
Dwight D. Eisenhower	August 27 – September 2, 1959	United Kingdom	London, Balmoral, Chequers	Informal visit. Met with Prime Minister Harold Macmillan and Queen Elizabeth II.
Dwight D. Eisenhower	September 4–7, 1959	United Kingdom	Culzean Castle	Rested before returning to the United States.
John F. Kennedy	June 4–5, 1961	United Kingdom	London	Private visit. Met with Prime Minister Harold Macmillan and Queen Elizabeth II.
John F. Kennedy	June 26–29, 1963	Ireland	Dublin, Wexford, Cork, Galway, Limerick	First visit to the island of Ireland by an incumbent U.S. President. Addressed the Oireachtas. Visited ancestral home.
John F. Kennedy	June 29–30, 1963	United Kingdom	Birch Grove	Informal visit with Prime Minister Harold Macmillan at his home.
Richard Nixon	February 24–26, 1969	United Kingdom	London	Informal visit. Delivered several public addresses.
Richard Nixon	August 3, 1969	United Kingdom	RAF Mildenhall	Informal meeting with Prime Minister Harold Wilson.
Richard Nixon	October 3, 1970	United Kingdom	Chequers	Met informally with Queen Elizabeth II and Prime Minister Edward Heath.
Richard Nixon	October 3–5, 1970	Ireland	Limerick, Timahoe, Dublin	State visit. Met with Taoiseach Jack Lynch.
Jimmy Carter	May 5–11, 1977	United Kingdom	London, Newcastle, Sunderland	Attended the 3rd G7 summit. Also met with the Prime Ministers of Greece, Belgium, Turkey, Norway, the Netherlands, and Luxembourg, and with the President of Portugal. Addressed the NATO Ministers meeting.
Ronald Reagan	June 7–9, 1982	United Kingdom	London, Windsor Castle	Met with Queen Elizabeth II and Prime Minister Margaret Thatcher. Addressed Parliament.
Ronald Reagan	June 1–4, 1984	Ireland	Shannon, Galway, Ballyporeen, Dublin	Met with President Patrick Hillery and Taoiseach Garret FitzGerald. Visited ancestral home. Addressed the Oireachtas.
Ronald Reagan	June 4–10, 1984	United Kingdom	London	Met with Queen Elizabeth II and Prime Minister Margaret Thatcher. Attended the 10th G7 summit.
Ronald Reagan	June 2–3, 1988	United Kingdom	London	Met with Queen Elizabeth II, Prime Minister Margaret Thatcher and Japanese Prime Minister Noboru Takeshita.
George H. W. Bush	May 31–June 2, 1989	United Kingdom	London	Met with Queen Elizabeth II and Prime Minister Margaret Thatcher.
George H. W. Bush	July 5–6, 1990	United Kingdom	London	Attended NATO Summit Meeting.
George H. W. Bush	July 14–18, 1991	United Kingdom	London	Attended the 17th G7 summit. Also met with Soviet President Mikhail Gorbachev.
Bill Clinton	June 4–5, 1994	United Kingdom	Cambridge, London, Portsmouth	Visited U.S. Military Cemetery. Met with Prime Minister John Major. Attended state dinner with Queen Elizabeth II and heads of state and government of Canada, Poland, the Czech Republic, Slovakia, Australia, New Zealand, Norway and Belgium. Attended the 50th anniversary of D-Day commemorative ceremonies.
Bill Clinton	June 8, 1994	United Kingdom	Oxford	Received honorary degree from Oxford University.
Bill Clinton	November 28– December 1, 1995	United Kingdom	London, Belfast, Derry	Met with Queen Elizabeth II and Prime Minister John Major. Laid a wreath at the Tomb of the Unknown Warrior in Westminster Abbey. Addressed a joint session of the British Parliament. Became the first incumbent President to visit Northern Ireland, where he made several public addresses before travelling on to Ireland.
Bill Clinton	December 1–2, 1995	Ireland	Dublin	Arrived from Northern Ireland. He met with President Mary Robinson and Taoiseach John Bruton.
Bill Clinton	May 28–29, 1997	United Kingdom	London	Met with Prime Minister Tony Blair and attended a Cabinet meeting.
Bill Clinton	May 14–18, 1998	United Kingdom	Birmingham, Weston-under-Lizard, London	Attended the 24th G8 summit and the U.S.-EU Summit Meeting.
Bill Clinton	September 3, 1998	United Kingdom	Belfast, Armagh, Omagh	Part of a general visit to the island of Ireland. Met with Prime Minister Tony Blair and Northern Irish political leaders. Addressed the Northern Ireland Assembly.
Bill Clinton	September 3–5, 1998	Ireland	Dublin, Adare, Limerick, Ballybunion	Met with Taoiseach Bertie Ahern. Delivered several public addresses and played golf.
Bill Clinton	December 12, 2000	Ireland	Dublin, Dundalk	Met with Taoiseach Bertie Ahern. Delivered several public addresses.
Bill Clinton	December 12–14, 2000	United Kingdom	Belfast, London, Coventry	Met with Prime Minister Tony Blair and Northern Irish political leaders in Belfast. Met with Queen Elizabeth II; made a speech at the University of Warwick.
George W. Bush	July 18–20, 2001	United Kingdom	London, Chequers, Halton, Brize Norton	Met with Prime Minister Tony Blair and Queen Elizabeth II.
George W. Bush	April 7–8, 2003	United Kingdom	Belfast, Hillsborough	Only visited Northern Ireland. Met with Prime Minister Tony Blair at Hillsborough Castle to discuss the reconstruction of Iraq. Also met with the Irish Taoiseach Bertie Ahern and Northern Irish political leaders.
George W. Bush	November 18–21, 2003	United Kingdom	London, Sedgefield	State visit. Met with Queen Elizabeth II, laid a wreath at the Tomb of the Unknown Warrior in Westminster Abbey, gave an address at Banqueting House, and accompanied Prime Minister Blair on a tour of the latter's constituency in Sedgefield.
George W. Bush	June 25–26, 2004	Ireland	Shannon, Dromoland Castle	Attended the U.S.-EU summit meeting. Met with Taoiseach Bertie Ahern.
George W. Bush	July 6–8, 2005	United Kingdom	Gleneagles	Attended the 31st G8 summit.
George W. Bush	February 28, 2006	Ireland	Shannon	Met with U.S. Marines who were en route to Iraq.
George W. Bush	June 15–16, 2008	United Kingdom	London, Windsor Castle, Belfast	Met with Queen Elizabeth II at Windsor Castle. Met with Prime Minister Gordon Brown and Quartet Representative Tony Blair. In Belfast, met with the Northern Ireland First Minister Peter Robinson and the Deputy First Minister Martin McGuinness.
Barack Obama	March 31–April 3, 2009	United Kingdom	London	Met with Queen Elizabeth II and Prime Minister Gordon Brown. Attended the G20 summit meeting.
Barack Obama	May 23, 2011	Ireland	Dublin, Moneygall	Met with President Mary McAleese and Taoiseach Enda Kenny. Visited ancestral home.
Barack Obama	May 23–26, 2011	United Kingdom	London	State visit. Met with Queen Elizabeth II. Laid a wreath at the Tomb of the Unknown Warrior in Westminster Abbey. Addressed a joint session of the British Parliament. Met with Prime Minister David Cameron and Labour Party leader Ed Miliband.
Barack Obama	June 17–18, 2013	United Kingdom	Belfast, Lough Erne	Attended the 39th G8 summit in County Fermanagh, Northern Ireland.
Barack Obama	September 4–5, 2014	United Kingdom	Newport	Attended the NATO Summit Meeting.
Barack Obama	April 21–24, 2016	United Kingdom	London, Windsor Castle, Watford	Met with Queen Elizabeth II at Windsor Castle. Met with Prime Minister David Cameron and Labour Party leader Jeremy Corbyn.
Donald Trump	July 12–15, 2018	United Kingdom	London, Blenheim Palace, Chequers, Windsor Castle, Turnberry	Met with Prime Minister Theresa May. Met with Queen Elizabeth II at Windsor Castle. Spent weekend at his golf course in Turnberry.
Donald Trump	June 3–5, 2019	United Kingdom	London, Portsmouth	State visit. Met with Queen Elizabeth II. Laid a wreath at the Tomb of the Unknown Warrior in Westminster Abbey. Met with Prime Minister Theresa May. Attended the 75th anniversary of D-Day commemorative ceremonies.
Donald Trump	June 5–6, 2019	Ireland	Shannon, County Clare	Met with Taoiseach Leo Varadkar. Spent one night at his international golf resort in Doonbeg, County Clare.
Donald Trump	June 6–7, 2019	Ireland	Shannon, County Clare	Spent another night at his international golf resort in Doonbeg.
Donald Trump	December 2–4, 2019	United Kingdom	Watford, London	Attended the NATO Summit Meeting.
Joe Biden	June 10–13, 2021	United Kingdom	London, Carbis Bay, Windsor Castle	Attended the 47th G7 summit. Met with Queen Elizabeth II at Windsor Castle.
Joe Biden	November 1–2, 2021	United Kingdom	Glasgow	Attended the United Nations Climate Change Conference.
Joe Biden	September 17–19, 2022	United Kingdom	London	Attended the state funeral of Queen Elizabeth II. Met with King Charles III.
Joe Biden	April 11–12, 2023	United Kingdom	Belfast	Arrived at Belfast International Airport at Aldergrove. Visited Belfast as part of the 25th anniversary celebrations of the Good Friday Agreement (GFA). Met with Prime Minister Rishi Sunak. Spoke at the new Ulster University campus at York Street in Belfast city centre.
Joe Biden	April 12–14, 2023	Ireland	Dublin, Carlingford, Dundalk, Knock, Ballina	Met with President Michael D. Higgins, at Áras an Uachtaráin, and Taoiseach Leo Varadkar, at Farmleigh House. Addressed the Oireachtas. Visited ancestral homes in County Louth and County Mayo.
Joe Biden	July 10–12, 2023	United Kingdom	London, Windsor	Met with Prime Minister Rishi Sunak. Met with King Charles III at Windsor Castle.
Donald Trump	July 25–29, 2025	United Kingdom	Turnberry	Visited his golf course in Turnberry as well as his property in Aberdeenshire. Also met with Prime Minister Keir Starmer.
Donald Trump	September 16–18, 2025	United Kingdom	Windsor Castle, Chequers	State visit. Met King Charles III at Windsor Castle and Prime Minister Keir Starmer at Chequers.
Donald Trump	September 12–13, 2026	Ireland	Dublin, County Clare	Participated in a courtesy call with President Catherine Connolly at Áras an Uachtaráin and met with Taoiseach Micheál Martin at Farmleigh. Also met with business leaders and embassy workers at Deerfield Residence and visited his golf resort near Doonbeg for the 2026 Irish Open.

== Gallery ==
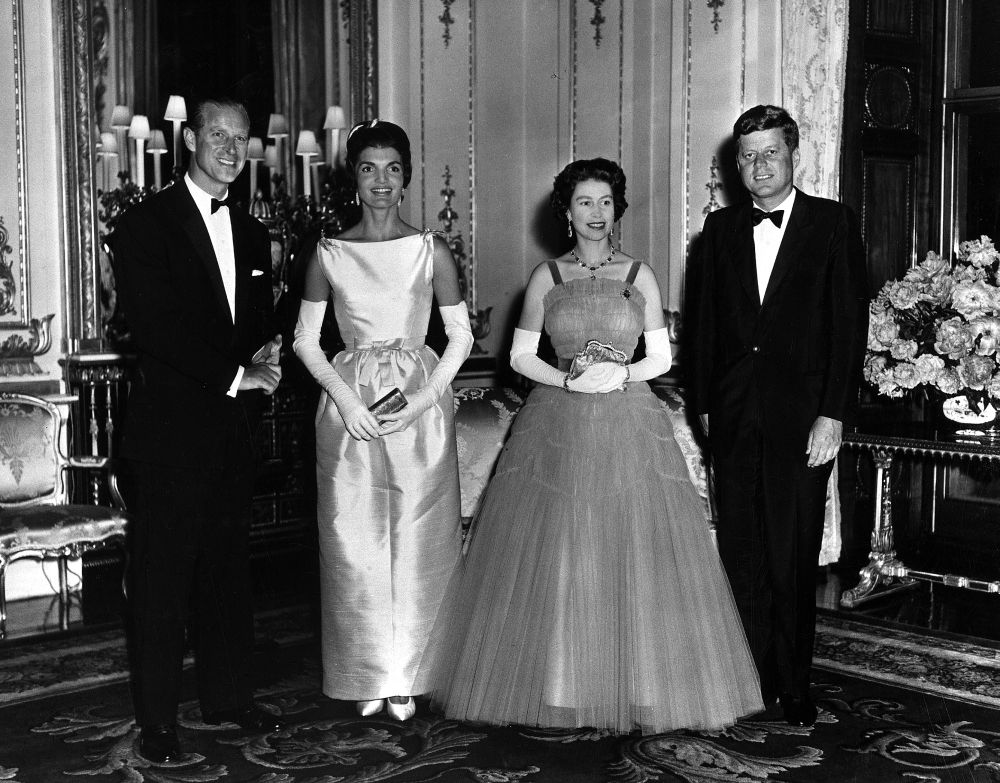
President John F. Kennedy and First Lady Jacqueline Kennedy meet with Queen Elizabeth II and Prince Philip at Buckingham Palace, London, England (1961).

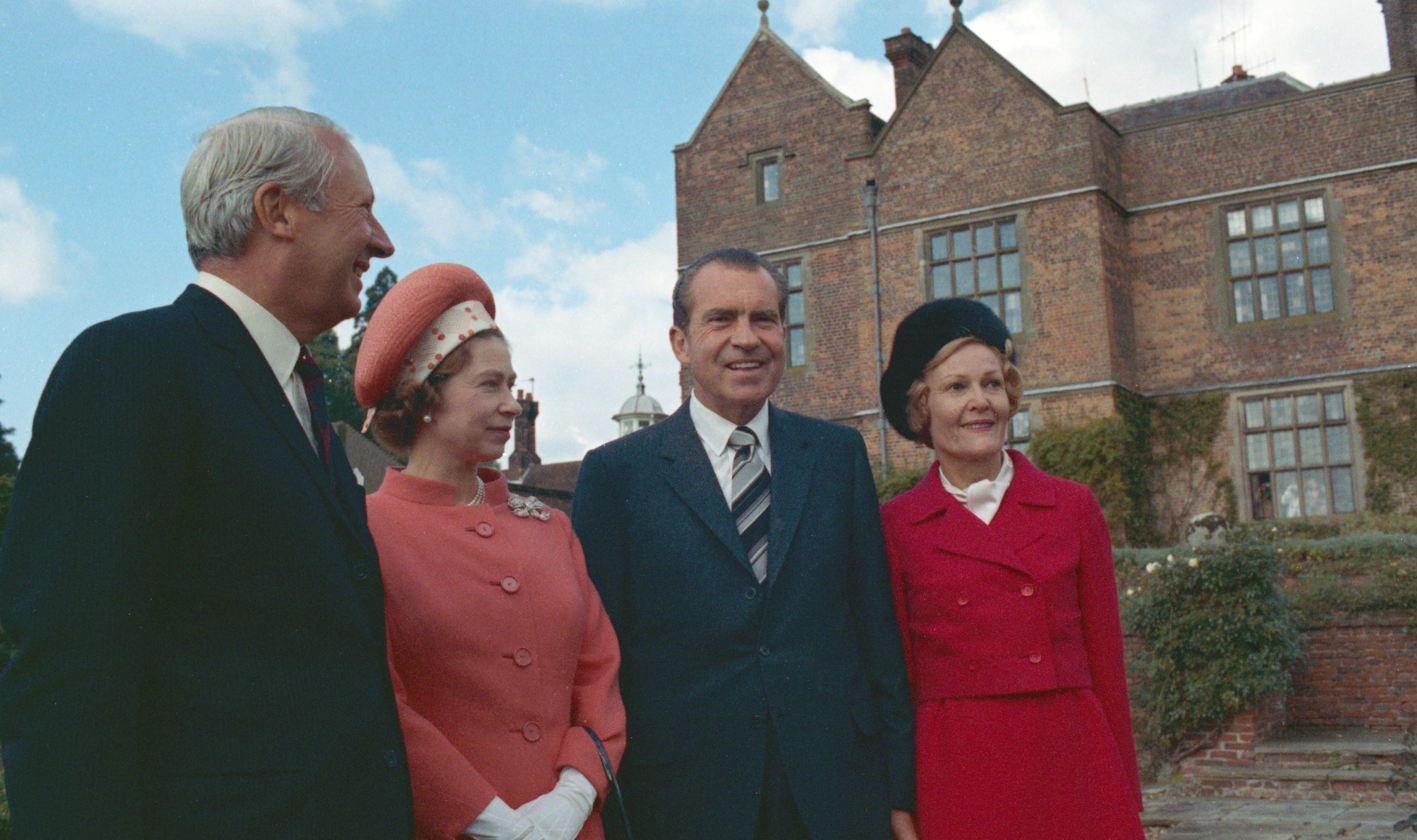
President Richard Nixon and First Lady Pat Nixon meet with Prime Minister Edward Heath and Queen Elizabeth II at Chequers (1970).

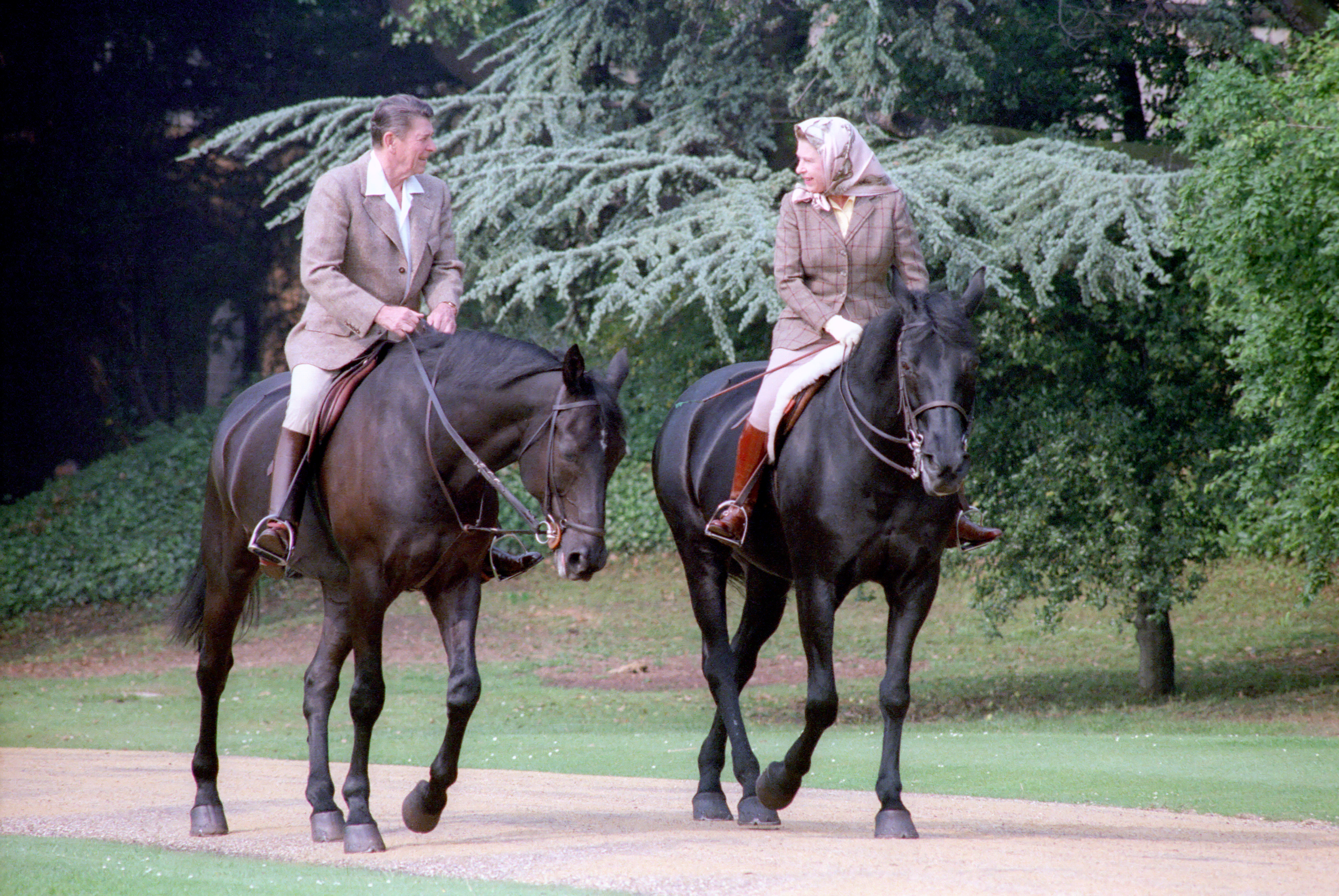
President Ronald Reagan and Queen Elizabeth II at Windsor Castle, Windsor, England (1982)

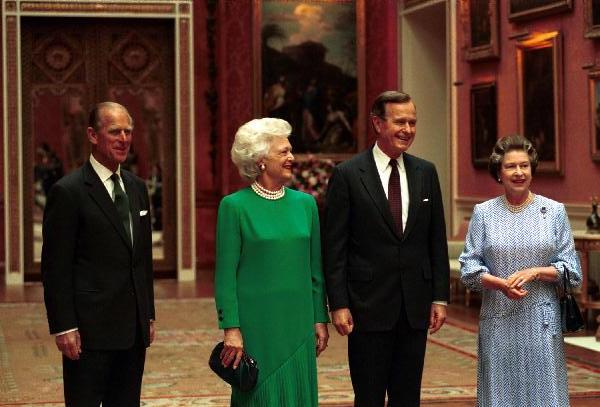
President George H. W. Bush and First Lady Barbara Bush with Queen Elizabeth II and Prince Philip at Buckingham Palace, London, England (1989)

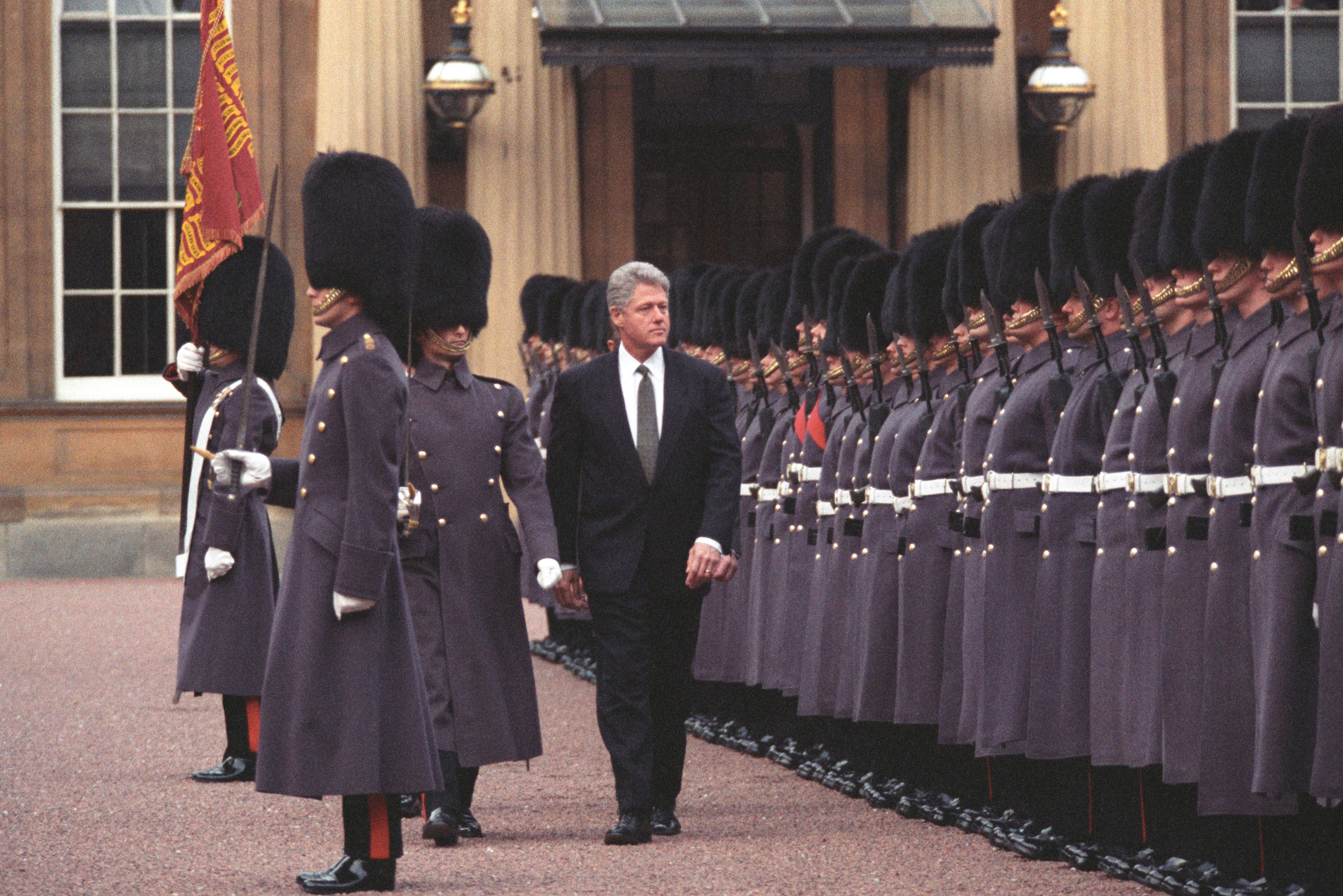
President Bill Clinton and Prince Philip inspect the Queen's Guard at Buckingham Palace, London, England (1995).

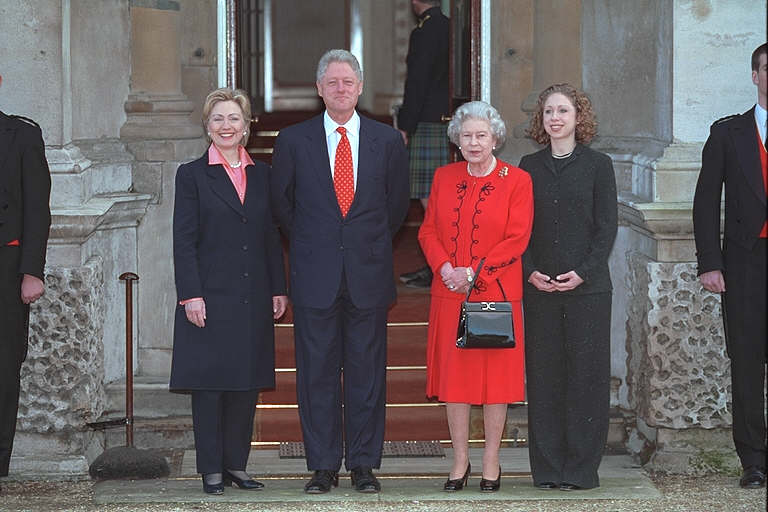
President Bill Clinton, First Lady Hillary Clinton, and Chelsea Clinton meet with Queen Elizabeth II at Buckingham Palace, London, England (2000).

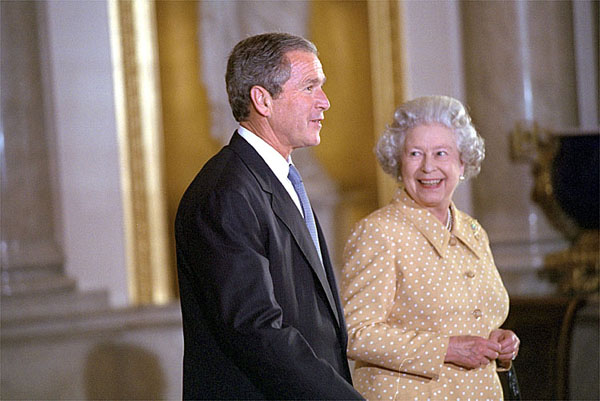
President George W. Bush with Queen Elizabeth II at Buckingham Palace, London, England (2001)

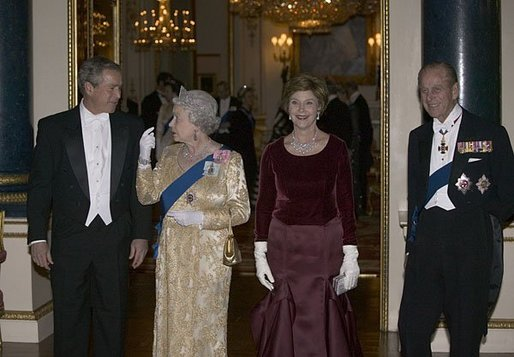
President George W. Bush and First Lady Laura Bush with Queen Elizabeth II and Prince Philip at Buckingham Palace, London, England (2003)

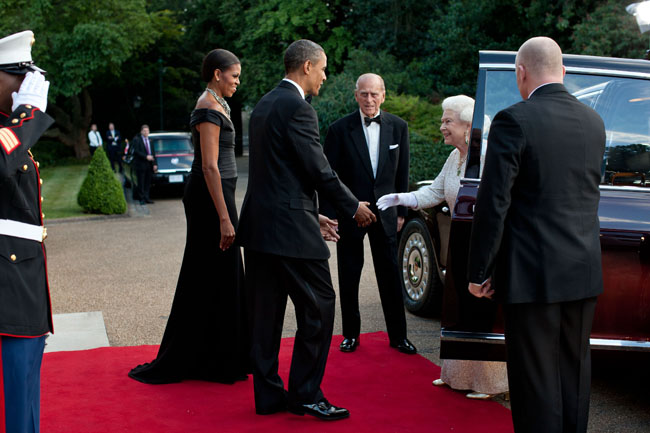
President Barack Obama and First Lady Michelle Obama receive Queen Elizabeth II and Prince Philip at Winfield House, London, England (2011).

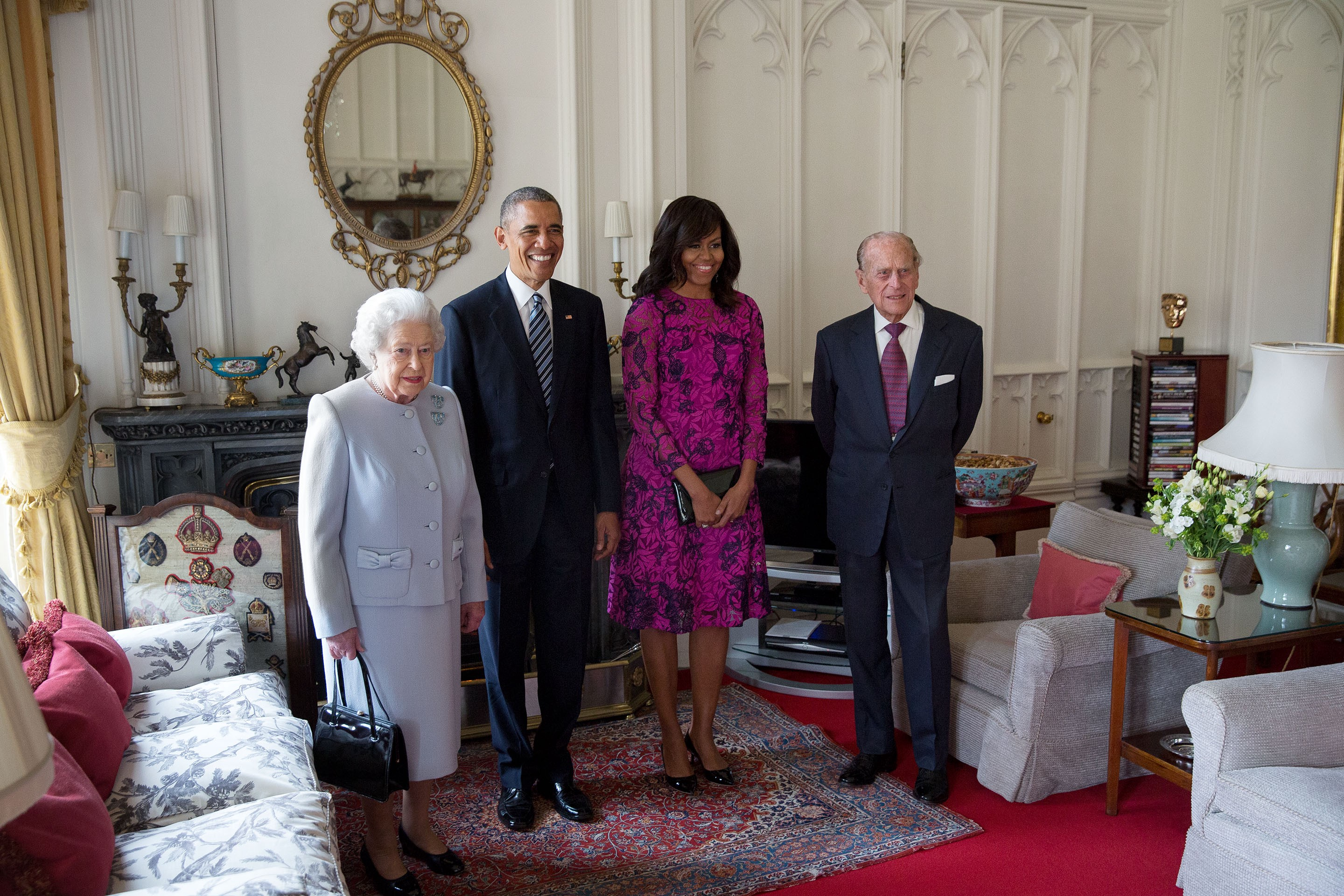
President Barack Obama and First Lady Michelle Obama meet with Queen Elizabeth II and Prince Philip at Windsor Castle, Windsor, England (2016).

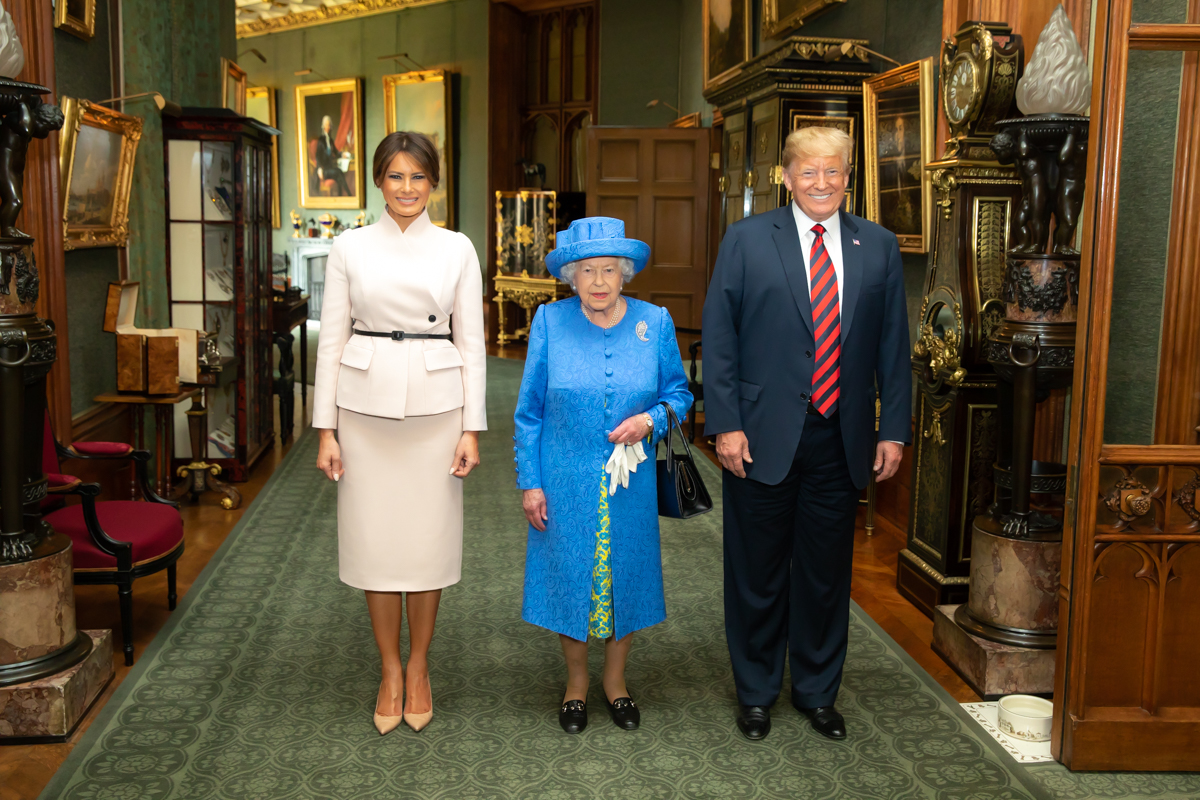
President Donald Trump and First Lady Melania Trump meet with Queen Elizabeth II at Windsor Castle, Windsor, England (2018).

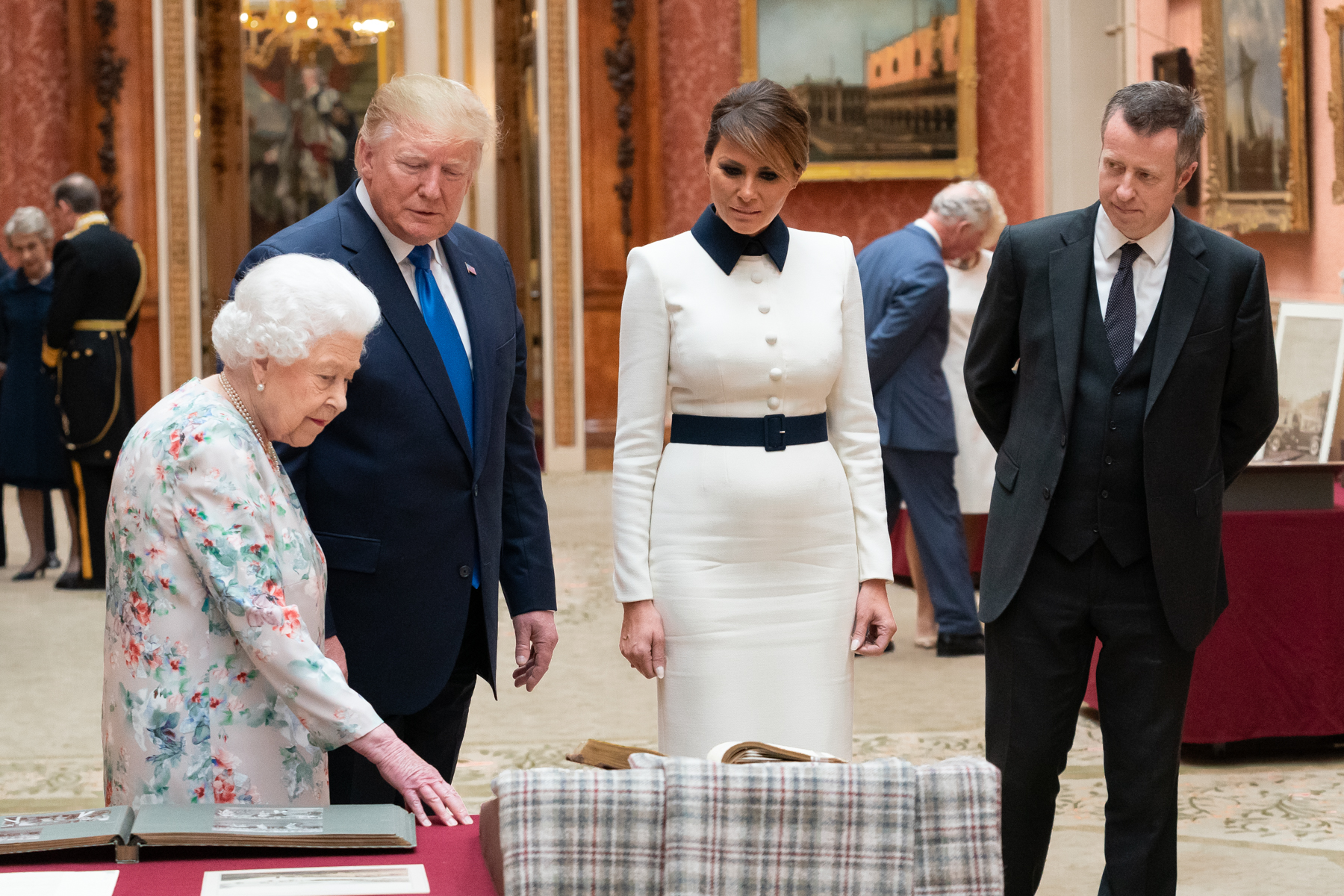
President Donald Trump and First Lady Melania Trump meet with Queen Elizabeth II at Buckingham Palace, London, England (2019).

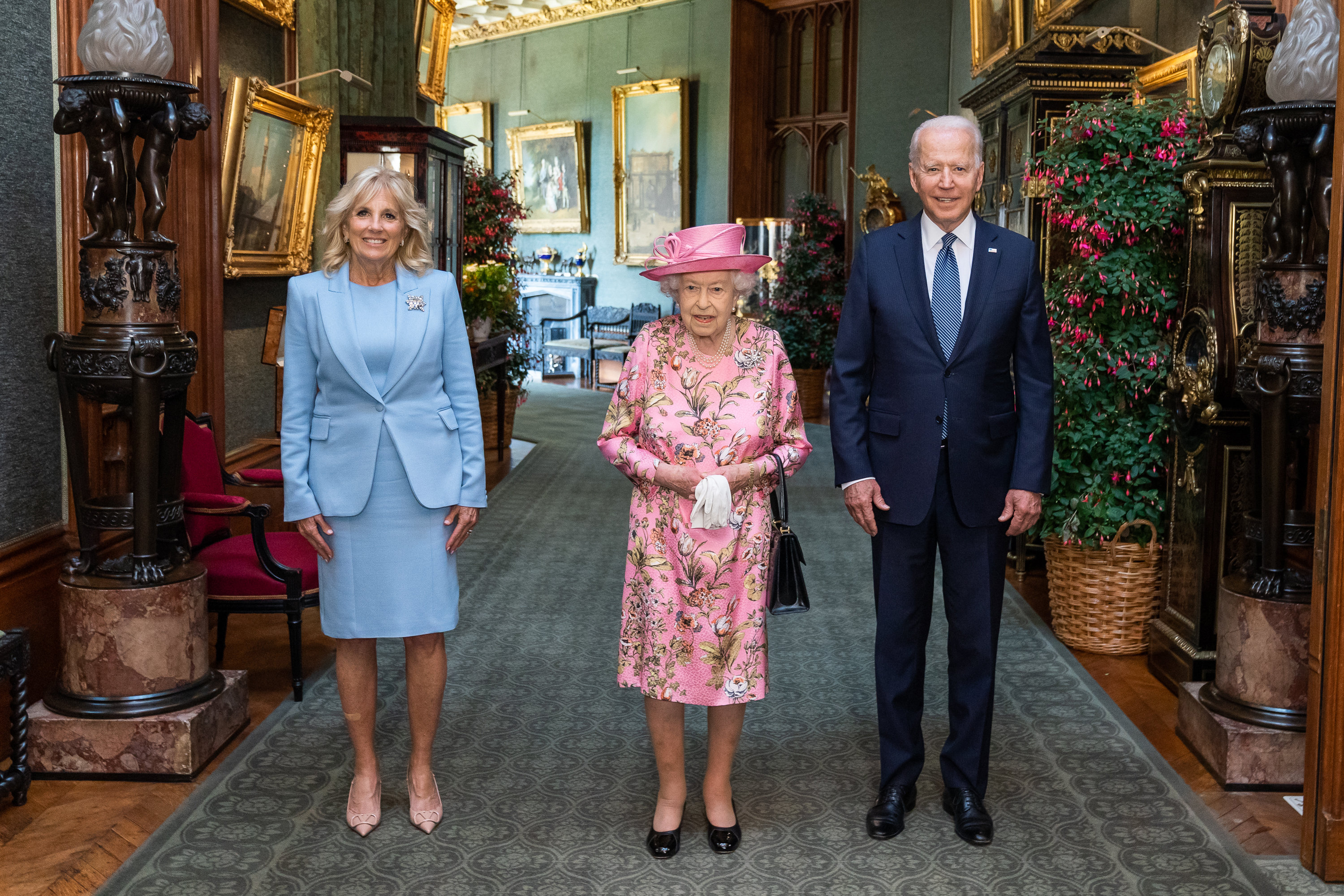
President Joe Biden and First Lady Jill Biden meet with Queen Elizabeth II at Windsor Castle, Windsor, England (2021).

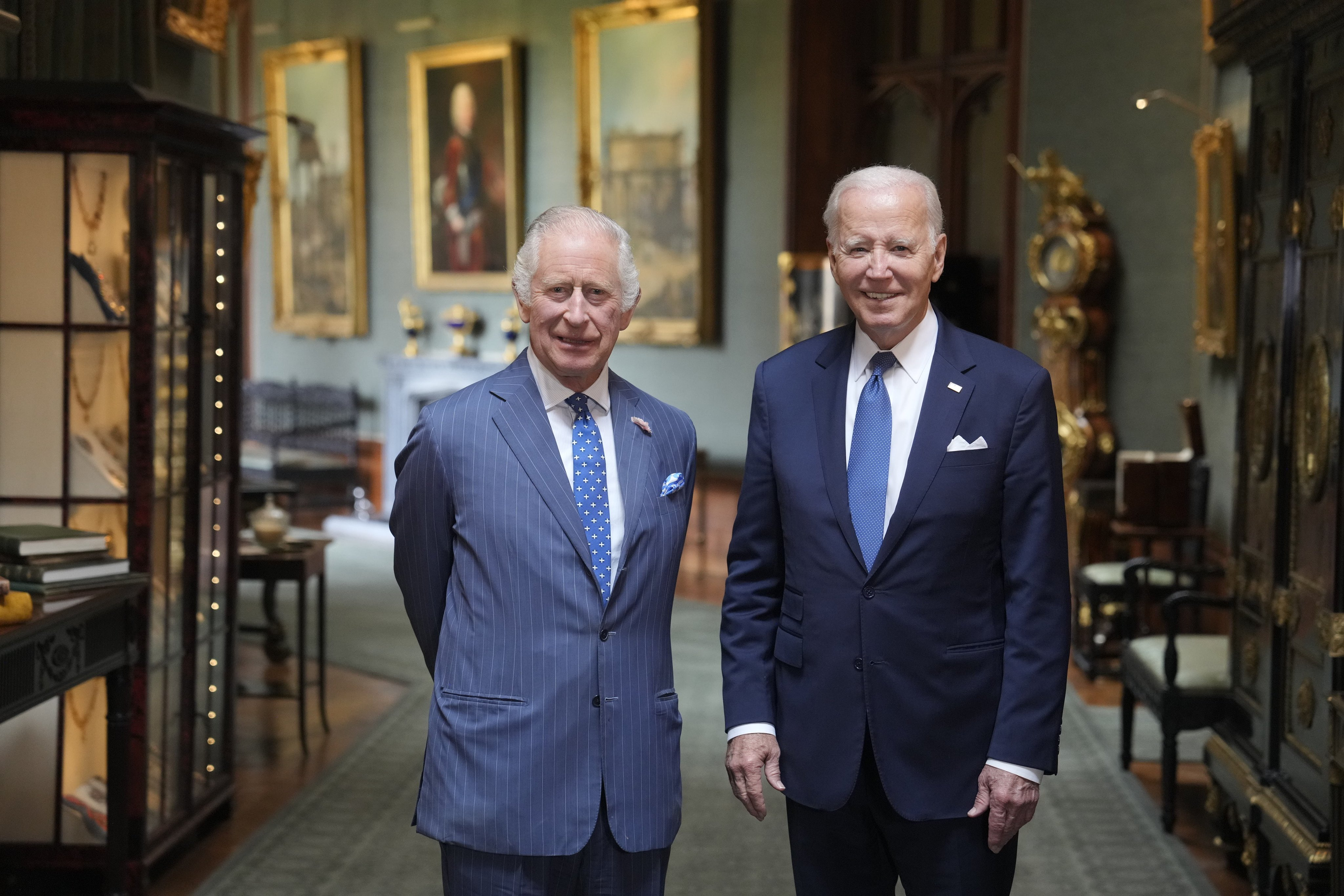
President Joe Biden meets with King Charles III at Windsor Castle, Windsor, England (2023).

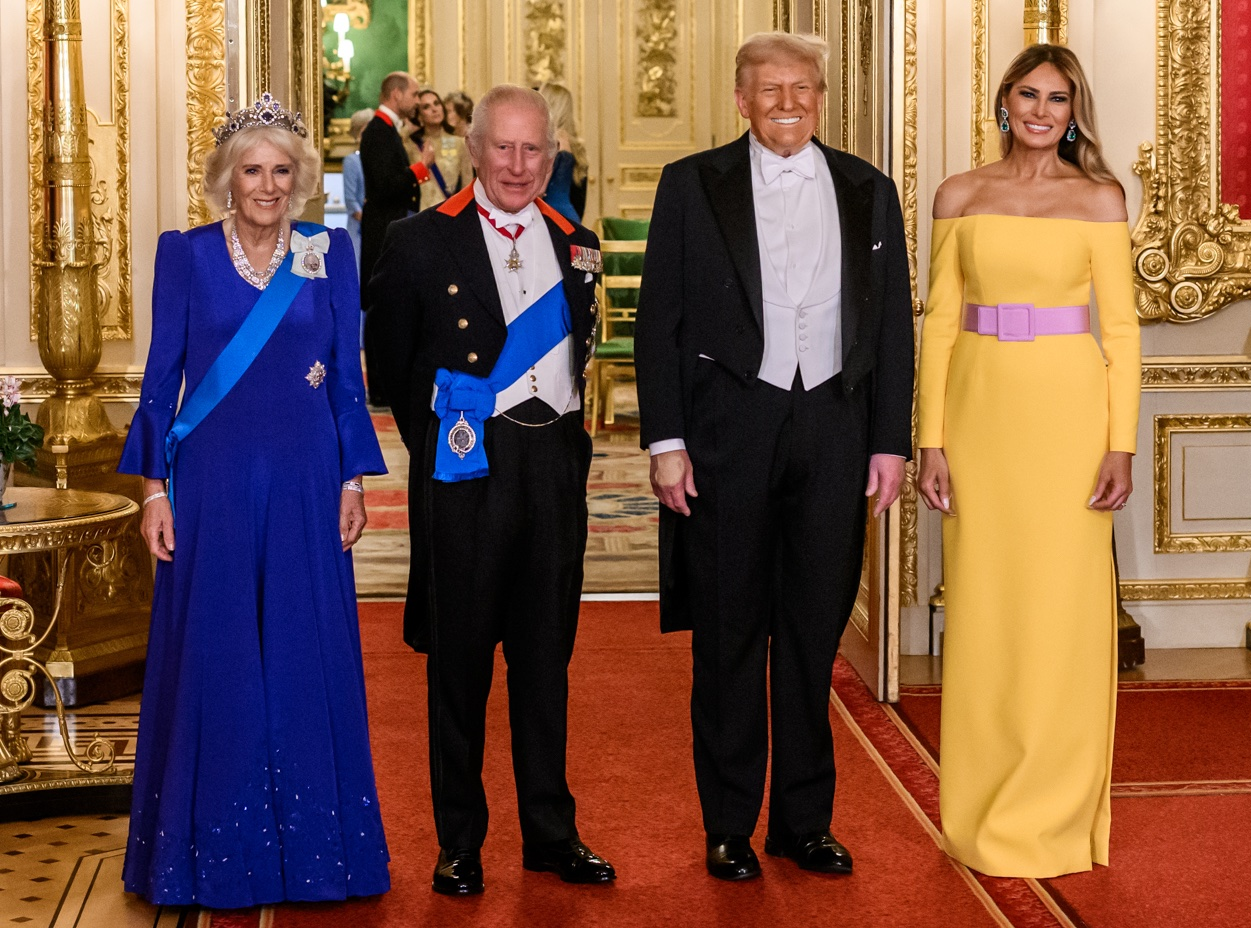
President Donald Trump and First Lady Melania Trump with King Charles III and Queen Camilla at Windsor Castle, Windsor, England (2025).

== See also ==
- United Kingdom–United States relations
- Ireland–United States relations
- Foreign policy of the United States
- Foreign relations of the United States
