= Laura Packard =

American health care activist and political commentator

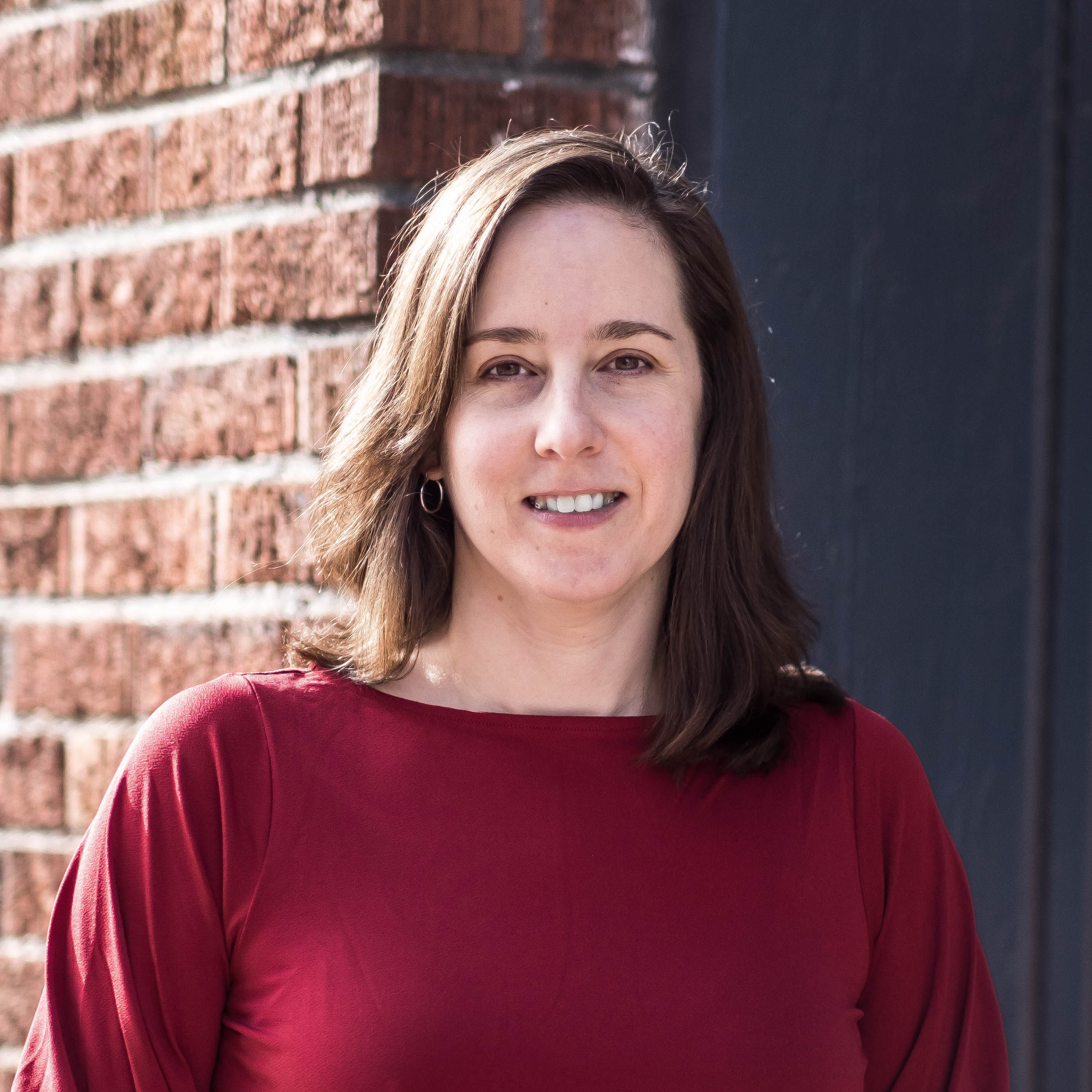
- Packard in 2020
- Born: 1976 (age 49–50)
- Education: University of Michigan (BS, Computer Science)
- Occupations: Health policy and health justice advocate
- Known for: Health Care Voices, Voices of Health Care Action, Health Care Voter
- Website: www.laurapackard.com

Laura Packard (born 1976) is an American health care activist and political commentator. She is the founder of Health Care Voices and Voices of Health Care Action, non-profit grassroots organizations for adults with serious medical conditions. Packard is executive director of the group Health Care Voter, with actress Alyssa Milano, singer T-Boz, politicians Donna Edwards and Anton Gunn, activists Ady Barkan and Brad Woodhouse, and others as co-chairs. She hosts a weekly call-in streaming show and podcast for Americans with health care and health insurance questions, Care Talk.

Packard was a featured speaker at the 2020 Democratic National Convention with Joe Biden, sharing her personal health care story.

A self-employed small business owner in Nevada, she was diagnosed with stage-4 Hodgkin lymphoma in 2017. Believing that the Affordable Care Act saved her life and that without it she would be bankrupt or dead without the care she received through her insurance, Packard became an outspoken critic of repeal attempts. Her sharp questioning led United States Senator Dean Heller to eject her from a public event, and her criticism of President Donald Trump resulted in him blocking her on Twitter. A 2018 lawsuit, Knight First Amendment Institute v. Trump, forced President Donald Trump to reinstate her access to his social media accounts, along with that of 40 others.

Packard spoke on six national bus tours with progressive health care advocacy organization Protect Our Care in 2018, 2019, 2021, 2022, 2023, and 2024, and a national bus tour with advocacy organization Courage for America on the debt ceiling crisis in 2023.

Moving to Colorado in 2019, her political advocacy broadened to include challenges to United States Senator Cory Gardner’s community engagement, and she went on a statewide bus tour with “Cardboard Cory” to accentuate his purported inaccessibility. She also challenged United States Representative Lauren Boebert's health care record. and was blocked by Boebert on Twitter in February 2022.

In 2018, Packard was noted for her outspoken opposition to the nomination of Justice Brett Kavanaugh. She was included again in media coverage for her 2020 opposition to the nomination of Justice Amy Coney Barrett.
