= Social media use by Donald Trump =

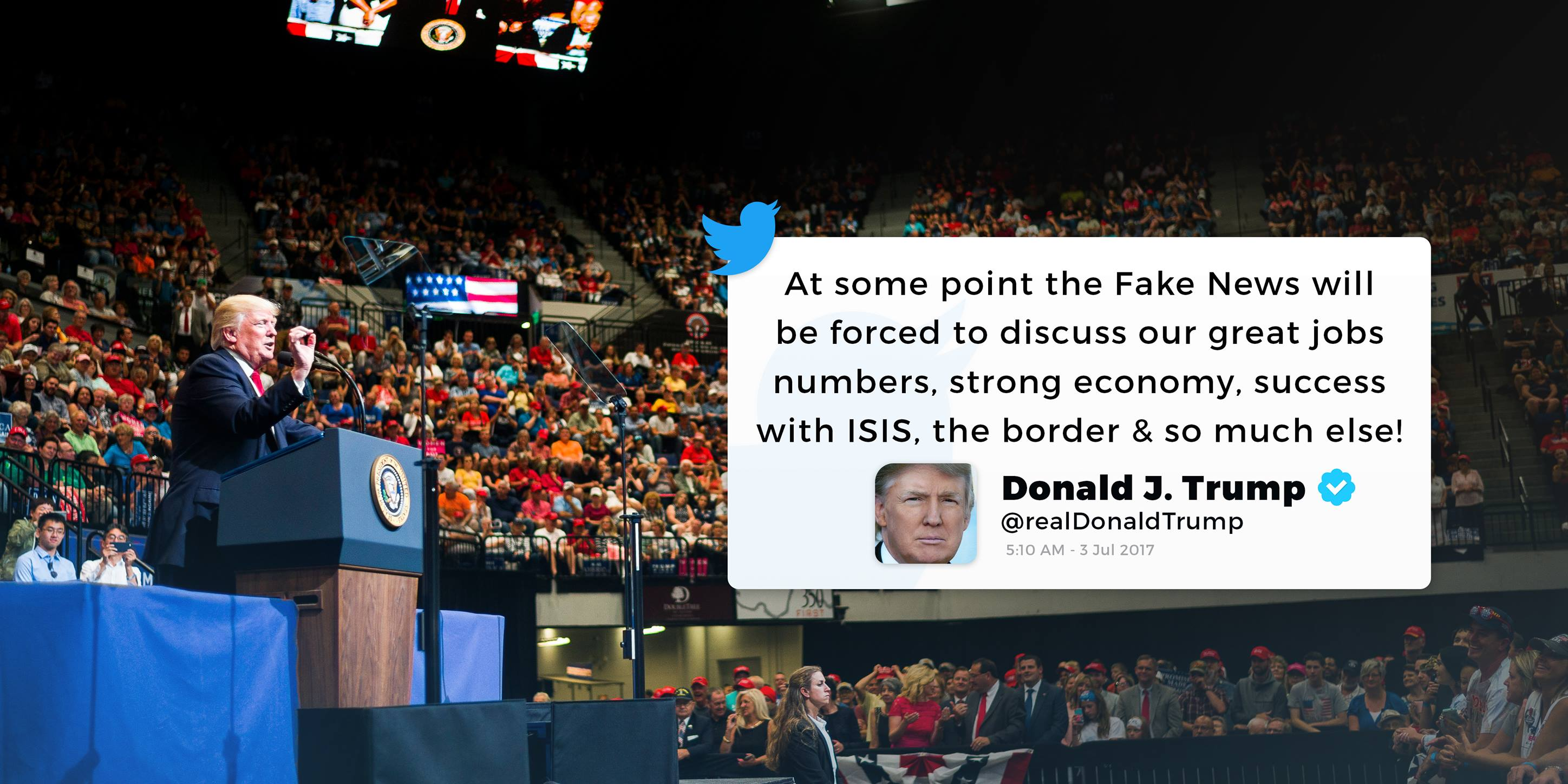
A 2017 Twitter post from Donald Trump

Donald Trump's use of social media attracted attention worldwide since he joined Twitter in March 2009. Over nearly twelve years, Trump tweeted around 57,000 times, including about 8,000 times during the 2016 election campaign and over 25,000 times during his presidency. The White House said the tweets should be considered official statements. When Twitter banned Trump from the platform in January 2021 during the final days of his term, his handle @realDonaldTrump had over 88.9 million followers. For most of Trump's first presidency, his account on Twitter, where he often posted controversial and false statements, remained unmoderated in the name of "public interest". Congress performed its own form of moderation, and in the face of this political censure, his tweets only accelerated.

During his 2020 reelection campaign, he falsely suggested that postal voting or electoral fraud may compromise the election, and after his election loss, Trump persistently undermined the election results, and his tweets played a role in inciting the attack of the US Capitol. Though the Senate eventually acquitted Trump during his second impeachment, social media companies swiftly banned him. Facebook and Instagram banned him for two years. During the first week in January 2021 that Trump was banned on several platforms, election-related misinformation declined 73 percent, according to research analytics firm Zignal Labs. In November 2022, Twitter's new owner, Elon Musk, reinstated his account, although Trump had stated he would not use it in favor of his own social media platform, Truth Social. In April 2023, at his arraignment hearing, Trump was warned by Acting New York Supreme Court Justice Juan Merchan not to use social media to incite violence.

== Background ==
The emergence of social media has changed the way in which political communication takes place in the United States. Political institutions such as politicians, political parties, foundations, institutions, and political think tanks are all using social media platforms, like Facebook and Twitter, to communicate with and engage voters. Regular individuals, politicians, "pundits" and thought leaders alike are able to voice their opinions, engage with a wide network, and connect with other likeminded individuals. Trump used narrowcasting as well as broadcasting on traditional media to good effect. His 2024 campaign and second presidency made frequent use of AI-generated content and memes to attract attention, many of them portraying Trump as outlandish pop-culture icons. Several posts received criticism for being insensitive and dehumanizing, such as in images portraying himself as the Pope or mocking immigrants being deported.

== Platforms ==
=== Twitter ===
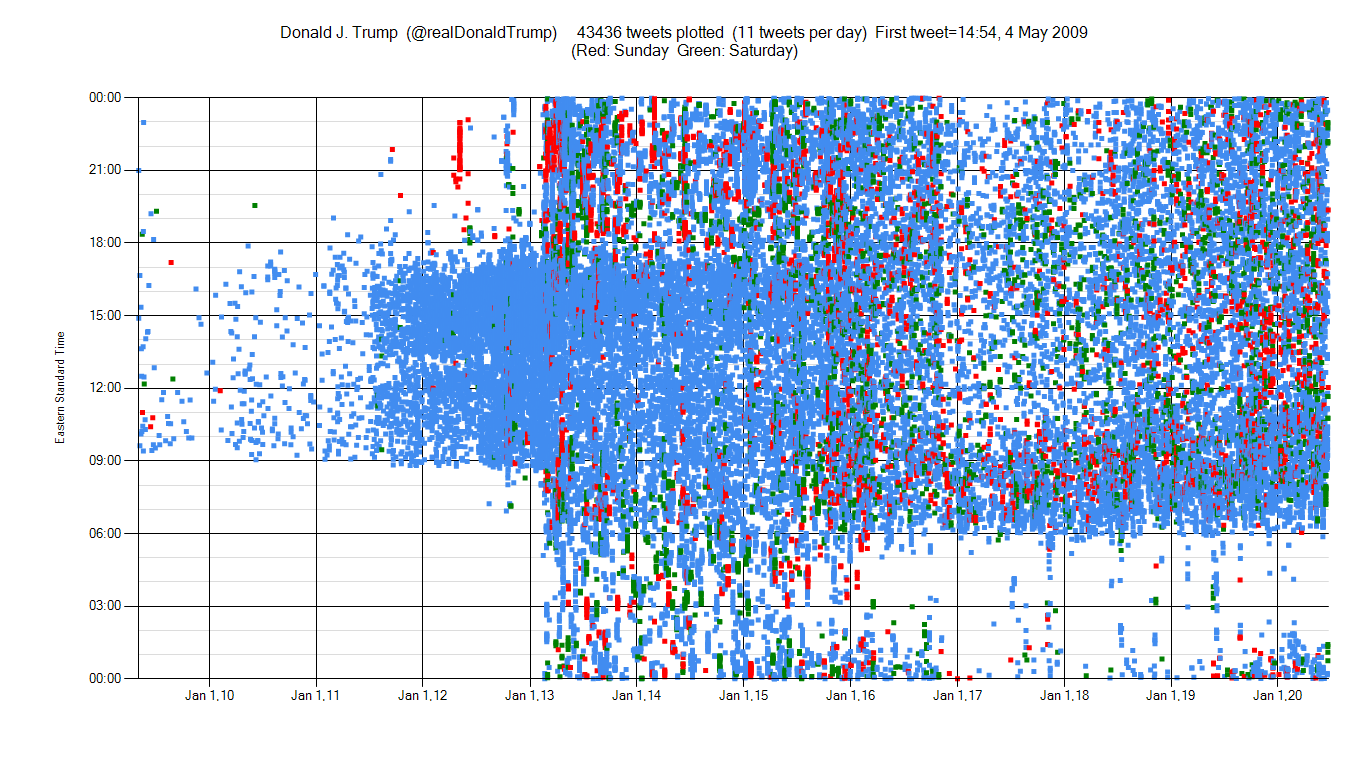
Trump's tweet activity from his first tweet in May 2009. His tweet activity pattern has changed from 2013.

For most of Trump's first term, his account on Twitter, where he often posted controversial and false statements, remained unmoderated in the name of "public interest". Congress performed its own form of moderation in June 2019, the House of Representatives voted mostly along party lines to censure him for "racist comments" he had tweeted two days previously. In the face of this political censure, his tweets only accelerated. An investigation by The New York Times published November 2, 2019, found that, during his time in office to date, Trump had already retweeted at least 145 accounts that "have pushed conspiracy or fringe content, including more than two dozen that have since been suspended."

After years of criticism for allowing Trump to post misinformation and falsehoods, Twitter began to tag some of his tweets with fact-checks in May 2020. In response, he said social media platforms "totally silence" conservatives and he would "strongly regulate, or close them down". During his 2020 reelection campaign, he falsely suggested that postal voting or electoral fraud may compromise the election, prompting Twitter to either remove such tweets or label them as disputed. After his election loss, Trump persistently undermined the election results in the weeks leading to Joe Biden's inauguration. His tweets played a role in inciting the January 2021, attack of the US Capitol during the formal counting of electoral votes. After his second impeachment, Twitter permanently suspended his @realDonaldTrump handle, followed by the official account of his campaign (@TeamTrump) and the accounts of allies who posted on his behalf, like Trump campaign digital director Gary Coby. Twitter also deleted three tweets by Trump on the @POTUS handle and barred access to the presidential account until Joe Biden's inauguration.

As Trump continued to issue brief statements, his spokesperson Liz Harrington tweeted screenshots of them under the Save America logo from June 2021 to June 2022. In November 2022, Twitter's new owner, Elon Musk, reinstated his account, and the first tweet since 2021 was made in August 2023 about his mugshot from Fulton County Jail, but the account remained inactive until he tweeted again in August 2024. In April 2023, at his arraignment hearing, Trump was warned by Acting New York Supreme Court Justice Juan Merchan not to use social media to incite violence.

=== Facebook and Instagram ===
==== Banned from both platforms ====
On January 6, 2021, amidst an attack at the Capitol while Congress was counting the electoral votes, Trump posted a short video. Facebook removed it and blocked Trump's ability to post new content to both platforms. Facebook's vice president of integrity, Guy Rosen, explained that the video "contributes to rather than diminishes the risk of ongoing violence." (YouTube also removed the same video. Twitter at first disabled comments; later, the Tweet was deleted.) The next day, Facebook said the block would remain at least until the end of Trump's term on January 20. On May 5, 2021, after considering whether to reinstate Trump's account, Facebook's Oversight Board upheld Trump's suspensions on Facebook and Instagram but instructed Meta Platforms to reassess the indefinite ban within six months, stating that "it is not permissible for Facebook to keep a user off the platform for an undefined period, with no criteria for when or whether the account will be restored." One month later, Facebook decided to extend Trump's ban to two years, as his actions "merit the highest penalty available under the new enforcement protocols," and reconsider his case no earlier than January 7, 2023.

On July 7, 2021, Trump announced class action lawsuits against Facebook, Twitter, and Google for alleged censorship of conservative voices. In January 2025, Meta Platforms agreed to pay $25 million to settle the lawsuit against Facebook, with $22 million going to Trump's future presidential library and the remainder to legal fees and other litigants.

On February 7, 2023, Meta reinstated Trump on Facebook and Instagram, having announced two weeks earlier that the risk to public safety had "sufficiently receded." Meta said there would be “new guardrails in place to deter repeat offenses" and that Trump could be banned for up to two years at a time in the future if he reoffends.

On March 17, 2023, Trump made his first Facebook post since his reinstatement: a video clip of his victory speech following the 2016 presidential election in which he stated, "Sorry to keep you waiting. Complicated business. Complicated."

==== Facebook ====
During his 2016 campaign, Trump posted a number of ads on his Facebook page attacking Hillary Clinton. The ads included parodies of Pokémon Go and Ms. Pac-Man, portraying Hillary Clinton as a Pokémon and as Ms. Pac-Man. Trump was charged less per ad than Clinton was, Wired claimed, but Facebook countered that Trump had been charged more.

Trump also used the platform to issue an apology for the Access Hollywood tape. As president, he was criticized for posting a news story about a purported Kuwaiti travel ban similar to Executive Order 13769; Kuwait's foreign minister confirmed that no such ban existed.

In 2017, Facebook briefed the House and Senate committees in their investigations of Russian interference in the US election. At the hearings, Facebook revealed that accounts linked to the Russian government had bought approximately $100,000 of Facebook advertisements during the election campaign. In response, Trump criticized Facebook in a series of tweets on September 27, 2017. "Facebook was always anti-Trump," he said, simultaneously extending the same criticism to "the Networks," The New York Times, and The Washington Post. Facebook CEO Mark Zuckerberg posted a statement to Facebook: "Trump says Facebook is against him. Liberals say we helped Trump. Both sides are upset about ideas and content they don't like. That's what running a platform for all ideas looks like."

A large Facebook group called "Stop the Steal" was dedicated to the idea that the November 2020 election was "stolen" from Trump by some type of fraud. Two days after the election, Facebook banned the group and its hashtags.

==== Instagram ====
Trump initially used his personal account on Instagram (@realDonaldTrump) primarily to share personal pictures, including images of himself with his grandchildren. In September 2015 – then with approximately 377 thousand followers– he used the platform to release a political advertisement. This ad, "Act of Love", attacked primary opponent Jeb Bush on the topic of immigration. Along with Bush's responses, it demonstrated that Instagram could be a political tool rather than merely a personal photo-sharing application. Trump also used the platform to contribute to the controversy regarding the 2016 film Ghostbusters by posting a video criticizing the all-female cast. In response, director Paul Feig claimed that "Trump supporters" were responsible for some of the "internet hate" directed at the film.

When Trump became president, his personal account had grown to over 5 million followers. He also assumed control of an official account (@whitehouse), where he posted pictures from his inauguration. At that time, it was expected that the official account would primarily feature the work of the Chief Official White House Photographer once one was selected; however, Shealah Craighead has contributed relatively little, especially in comparison to Pete Souza's work during the Obama administration.

=== Reddit ===
On July 27, 2016, Trump took part in an Ask Me Anything (AMA), where he responded to user-submitted questions from Reddit's r/The_Donald community. He offered replies on topics that varied from media bias and voter fraud to NASA, including a question about H-1B visas posed by far-right media personality Milo Yiannopoulos. Trump also posted several pre-debate messages on the subreddit.

=== YouTube ===
From 2011 until 2013 or 2014, Trump created over 80 installments of a vlog on YouTube called "From the Desk of Donald Trump". (Note: Cody Johnston reports that there were 96 installments from 2011 to 2014, including one duplicate. Olivia Nuzzi described the series as only running until 2013, with 83 installments.) In it, he discussed a variety of topics, ranging from serious issues such as the Libyan Civil War, Obamacare, and the American job market to less weighty matters, including the Vanity Fair Oscar party and his dislike of Mike McGlone's Rhetorical Questions advertisements for GEICO. In several installments, he speculated on a possible presidential candidacy in 2012 that never came to pass, but many of the themes featured in the vlog were part of his successful campaign in 2016. By June 2017, most of these videos were no longer available on YouTube under Trump's account.

Trump's YouTube account was suspended for policy violations for at least seven days on January 13, 2021, following the attack at the United States Capitol; for this period it was no longer possible for new videos to be uploaded to the site. On January 26, 2021, YouTube extended the ban stating, "In light of concerns about the ongoing potential for violence, the Donald J. Trump channel will remain suspended. Our teams are staying vigilant and closely monitoring for any new developments." On March 4, 2021, YouTube CEO Susan Wojcicki stated that YouTube will lift the suspension on Donald Trump's channel when "the risk of violence has decreased." On July 7, 2021, Trump filed a class action lawsuit against YouTube and its CEO. On March 17, 2023, YouTube reinstated Trump's YouTube account.

=== Snapchat ===
On June 3, 2020, Snapchat announced that it would no longer promote Trump's account on its "Discover" page, which curates stories from celebrities and politicians. This followed the President's sharing of his controversial June 1 photo outside St. John's Church, which had been taken after dispersing protestors from the area using tear gas. He had also shared screenshots of several tweets. Three days earlier, co-founder and CEO Evan Spiegel had sent a company memo stating that "we simply cannot promote accounts in America that are linked to people who incite racial violence, whether they do so on or off our platform."

On January 6, 2021, following the attack at the United States Capitol, Snapchat locked Trump's account. The company announced on January 13, 2021, that it would keep his account blocked permanently.

As of 2026, Snapchat is the only platform not to have reinstated Trump.

=== Twitch ===
Trump has a Twitch account used primarily to broadcast his rallies. On June 29, 2020, his account was temporarily banned. Twitch stated the ban was made because of violations in their rules against hate speech. They pointed out an incident in 2016 where Trump falsely made comments about rapists, drug dealers, and criminals coming to America from Mexico and an incident in his rally in Tulsa, Oklahoma, in 2020 where he told a fictional story of a "tough hombre" breaking into someone's home as proof of these violations. This ban was lifted two weeks later.

On January 7, 2021, Trump's Twitch account was disabled indefinitely. This was done in response to Trump's alleged incitement of the Capitol attack. On July 19, 2024, Twitch reinstated Trump's Twitch account.

=== Triller ===
In August 2020, Trump joined Triller and was immediately verified and promoted on the app. His action was interpreted by many as a move against TikTok, a Chinese competitor of Triller's. Trump had previously threatened to ban TikTok.

=== Parler ===
Parler, a social media platform that launched in 2018, attracted supporters of Donald Trump from its beginning. The Trump campaign has a Parler account, although Trump himself does not have a personal account as of early January 2021. Other Parler users include Trump's former campaign director Brad Parscale; Trump's son, Eric Trump; Senator Ted Cruz; and White House press secretary Kayleigh McEnany. After Facebook banned the "Stop the Steal" group several days after the November 2020 election, many of those people moved to Parler. There had been speculation that Donald Trump might move to Parler, although the platform remained relatively small compared to the Twitter platform he was accustomed to. After Trump was banned from Twitter and other platforms, his son-in-law Jared Kushner reportedly obstructed him from moving to Parler and Gab.

=== Gab ===
In early February 2021, multiple media outlets falsely reported that former-President Trump had joined Gab under the handle @realdonaldtrump. The Independent speculated "that confusion arose from the presence of a blue check mark indicating the account was verified" and Vice News speculated that the bio of the account, which read "45th President of the United States of America. Uncensored posts from the @realDonaldTrump Feed." had also caused confusion. The Gab post that was mistaken to be from Trump was actually from Gab CEO Andrew Torba and featured a copy of a genuine letter sent by Trump's lawyers to Democratic Representative Jamie Raskin, who had called on Trump to testify at his second impeachment hearing. Thousands of users on Gab, including QAnon influencers, were also led to believe after the post was made that Trump had joined the platform under the handle. Torba responded to the false reports in a post on Gab, saying that "@realdonaldtrump is and always has been a mirror archive of POTUS' tweets and statements that we've run for years. We've always been transparent about this and would obviously let people know if the President starts using it." He also criticized the media outlets that falsely reported that Trump had joined the platform. Also in response to the false reports, the @realdonaldtrump Gab account made a post that was pinned saying that the account is reserved for Trump and urged users of Gab to send messages to Trump asking him to join the platform.

=== Rumble ===
On June 26, 2021, Trump joined video hosting platform Rumble in preparation of recording his Ohio rally. On December 14, 2021, it was announced that Rumble was already providing cloud services to the Truth Social beta website.

=== Gettr ===
A new platform called Gettr was launched on July 4, 2021, with Jason Miller – an advisor to Trump's 2016 and 2020 campaigns – as CEO. Trump was reportedly not involved in Gettr, though Miller hoped he would join the platform.

=== TikTok ===
Though Trump had previously threatened to ban TikTok, on June 2, 2024, he made his first post on the platform.

=== Bluesky ===
In response to a May 2025 interview question by Wired whether Trump would be welcome as a Bluesky user, CEO Jay Graber stressed that "Yeah—Bluesky's for everyone, and we think that over time, the broader public conversation needs to be on an open protocol. That lets people choose their own moderation preferences." On October 17, 2025, several Trump administration agencies began posting on Bluesky, including the Department of Homeland Security which included a video clip of Graber saying "Bluesky's for everyone" in one of their first posts.

== Self-hosted media activity ==
Shortly after Trump left office, he quietly incorporated Trump Media & Technology Group in February 2021, a company that had no significant funding. On March 21, Trump posted a statement on his new website, 45office.com, which was "liked and shared" hundreds of thousands of times on Facebook and Twitter. That same day, Trump advisor Jason Miller claimed on Fox News that Trump would be "returning to social media in probably about two or three months" by founding a new network that would "completely redefine the game." He said he expected "tens of millions" of users. On October 20, 2021, Trump Media and Technology Group obtained hundreds of millions of dollars in funding by agreeing to merge with Digital World Acquisition, and the anticipated creation of a social media app called "Truth Social" was announced that same day.

=== 45office.com ===
On March 21, 2021, Trump posted a statement about the US–Mexico border to his website 45office.com that was "liked and shared more than 661,000 times" on Facebook and Twitter, although he himself was already banned from those platforms. The existence of the website 45office.com was formally announced a week later on March 29. It included a biography and photos of Trump and his wife. Visitors could make requests for personalized greetings or attendance at an event. The site centered around a history of Donald Trump's presidency that did not make mention of two impeachments, of any COVID-19 death toll, of the economic crash that followed the pandemic, or of the Capitol attack that marked the end of his term.

=== From the Desk of Donald J. Trump ===
On May 4, 2021, Trump launched a new web page, "From the Desk of Donald J. Trump", on the site of his Save America political action committee DonaldJTrump.com, where he was posting messages under 280 characters that visitors could share to Facebook or Twitter (platforms that had banned Trump from having his own accounts there). Although the site claimed to be a "communications platform" where his supporters could "freely and safely" speak, there was no way for users to post any content of their own nor to reply to Trump's posts. The day the blog launched, it had 159,000 social media interactions; on the second day, less than one-fifth that amount; and on subsequent days, at least for the next two weeks, it never reached 10 percent of the interaction of its first day. According to an estimate by The Washington Post, in mid-May, "Trump's website – including his new blog, fundraising page and online storefront – attracted fewer estimated visitors than the pet-adoption service Petfinder and the recipe site Delish." The site was permanently closed less than a month after its launch.

== Truth Social ==
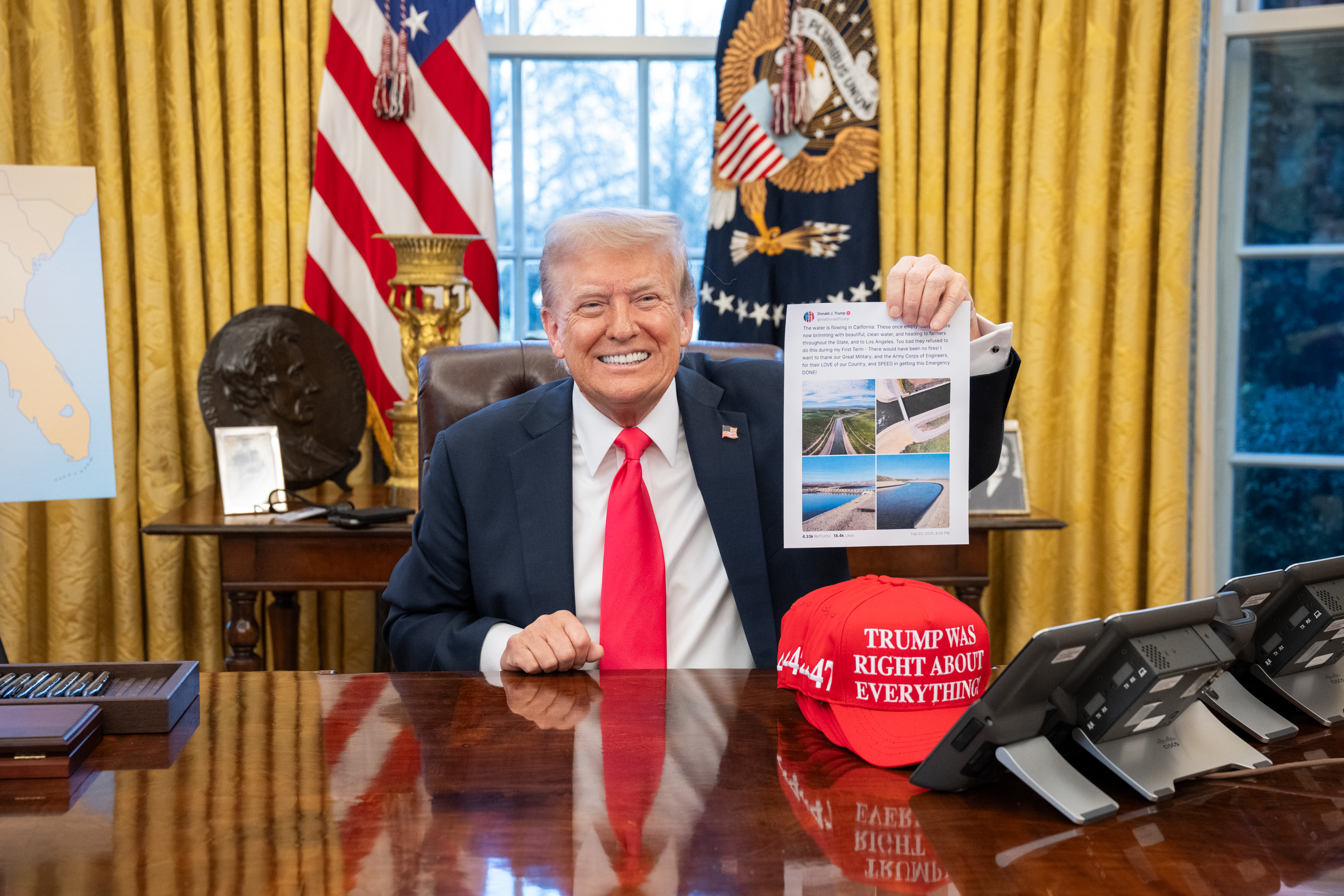
Donald Trump with a printout of a Truth Social post in 2025

DJT stock price reached over $79 per share after its public offering, but declined thereafter.

Since its public offering, Trump Media & Technology Group Corp. has had net operating losses.

On October 20, 2021, it was announced that Trump would be launching a new social media website called Truth Social. It is run by Trump Media & Technology Group (TMTG), a company incorporated in February 2021 and which on October 20, 2021, made a deal to merge with a special purpose acquisition company, Digital World Acquisition, that will fund it. The Republican National Committee sent an email the next day asking supporters to join Truth Social. Truth Social debuted in Apple's App Store in February 2022, and had reportedly drawn 1.2 million installations by the end of March.

According to reports, Trump has a licensing agreement with TMTG requiring him to use Truth Social as his primary social media platform, and to wait at least six hours before reposting material to any other social media platform, with some exceptions for political activities.

In 2023, in relation to his federal prosecution for allegedly inciting the January 6 United States Capitol attack, Trump made a post to Truth Social stating "IF YOU GO AFTER ME, I'M COMING AFTER YOU!", which was interpreted by prosecutors as a threat towards "witnesses, judges, attorneys, and others associated with legal matters pending against him". As a result, the Department of Justice requested a protective order against Donald Trump to prevent him from making public statements regarding the case. The order was issued on August 11, 2023.

As Trump encountered further legal problems including the prospect of more civil and criminal trials, he made numerous passionate posts to Truth Social regarding these matters and those involved in them. Commentators described some of them as 'rants' and 'unhinged'.

In April 2024, Trump was held in contempt of court in a New York court in relation to Truth Social posts about his business records falsification trial (the so-called "hush money trial") that violated a gag order made by the court. To comply with orders from the court, Trump deleted the postings from Truth Social.

On February 5, 2026, an animated video depicting Barack and Michelle Obama as apes was "re-truthed" from Trump's account, and subsequently deleted the following day after receiving backlash from both Democrats and Republicans. The White House initially defended the video, but later claimed it was posted by an unidentified staffer. Trump later admitted that he himself shared the video and refused to apologize for it. On February 14, Trump posted a lengthy statement deriding Bill Maher for allegedly not being respectful after the dinner and criticizing his recent policies on Real Time with Bill Maher.

On April 5, 2026, Trump posted a curse-filled statement on Truth Social threatening to attack Iranian civilian resources (bridges and power plants).

The post read:

Tuesday will be Power Plant Day, and Bridge Day, all wrapped up in one, in Iran. There will be nothing like it!!! Open the Fuckin' Strait, you crazy bastards, or you'll be living in Hell - JUST WATCH! Praise be to Allah. President DONALD J. TRUMP.

The post was criticized by the Council on American–Islamic Relations (CAIR) as mocking Allah and Islam and criticized by both Republicans and Democrats as being reckless and insensitive, especially since it was posted on Easter Sunday.

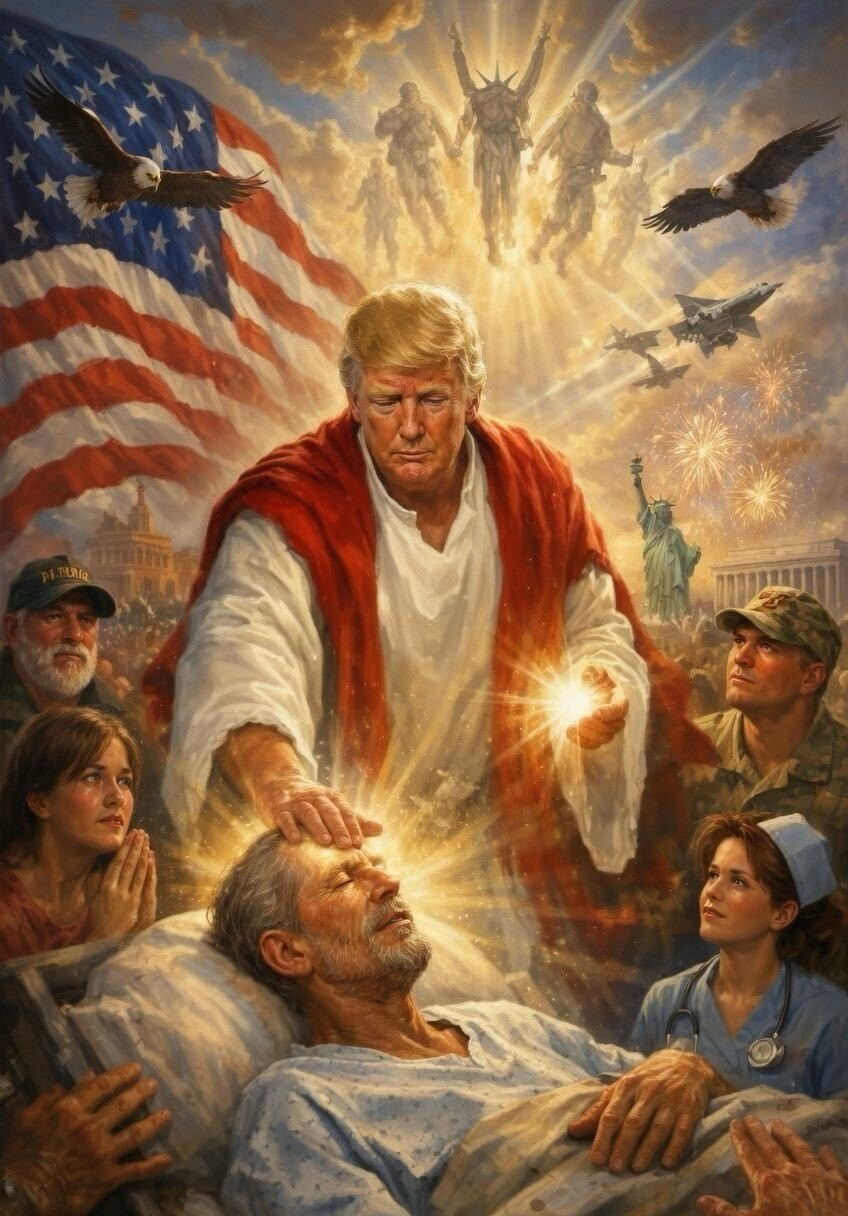
Trump posted this image to his Truth Social account on April 12, 2026. After criticism, the post was quickly deleted.

The next Tuesday, Trump posted "A whole civilization will die tonight, never to be brought back again. I don’t want that to happen, but it probably will". The post prompted more than 70 lawmakers to call for invoking the 25th Amendment to remove him from office. Amnesty International stated that Trump's statement may constitutes as a threat to commit genocide, according to the Genocide Convention and the Rome Statute. Jack Reed, a Democrat senator from Rhode Island, stated that threatening to eliminate a civilization is "comparable to genocide".

The following Sunday, Trump posted an AI-generated image of himself depicted as Jesus healing a sick man. Numerous news outlets ran stories about the picture, resulting in widespread condemnation, in particular from Evangelicals and Catholics. As a result, Trump deleted the post hours later, and then told reporters, "It's supposed to be me as a doctor".

== See also ==
- 1600 Daily – Former government newsletter
- Social media use by Barack Obama
- Fake news – False information presented as news
- History of communication by presidents of the United States
- List of Internet phenomena
- List of most-followed Twitter accounts
- Microtargeting – Usage of online data for individuals advertising
- Social media use in politics
- Trump administration communication during the COVID-19 pandemic – Aspect of 2020 viral outbreak
- Trump derangement syndrome – Pejorative term used to describe negative reactions to President Donald Trump
- Twitter diplomacy – Use of Twitter/X by diplomats
- Use of Twitter by public figures
- Volfefe index – Stock market index
