= Catalonia International =

Coordinates: 41.3980°N 2.1638°E

- Consorci Catalunya Internacional
- Predecessor: DIPLOCAT - Public Diplomacy Council of Catalonia
- Formation: July 10, 2024; 2 years ago
- Founder: Generalitat de Catalunya
- Legal status: Active
- Purpose: Increase awareness on Catalonia
- Headquarters: La Rambla
- Location: Barcelona

Catalonia International, formerly known as The Public Diplomacy Council of Catalonia (in Catalan language Consell de Diplomàcia Pública de Catalunya; acronym: DIPLOCAT) – is a public-private consortium set up by the Catalan government, the Generalitat. It is devoted to promoting international awareness of Catalonia within the international community through public diplomacy tools. In December 2018 its board of trustees appointed Ms. Laura Foraster as the new secretary general.

== History ==
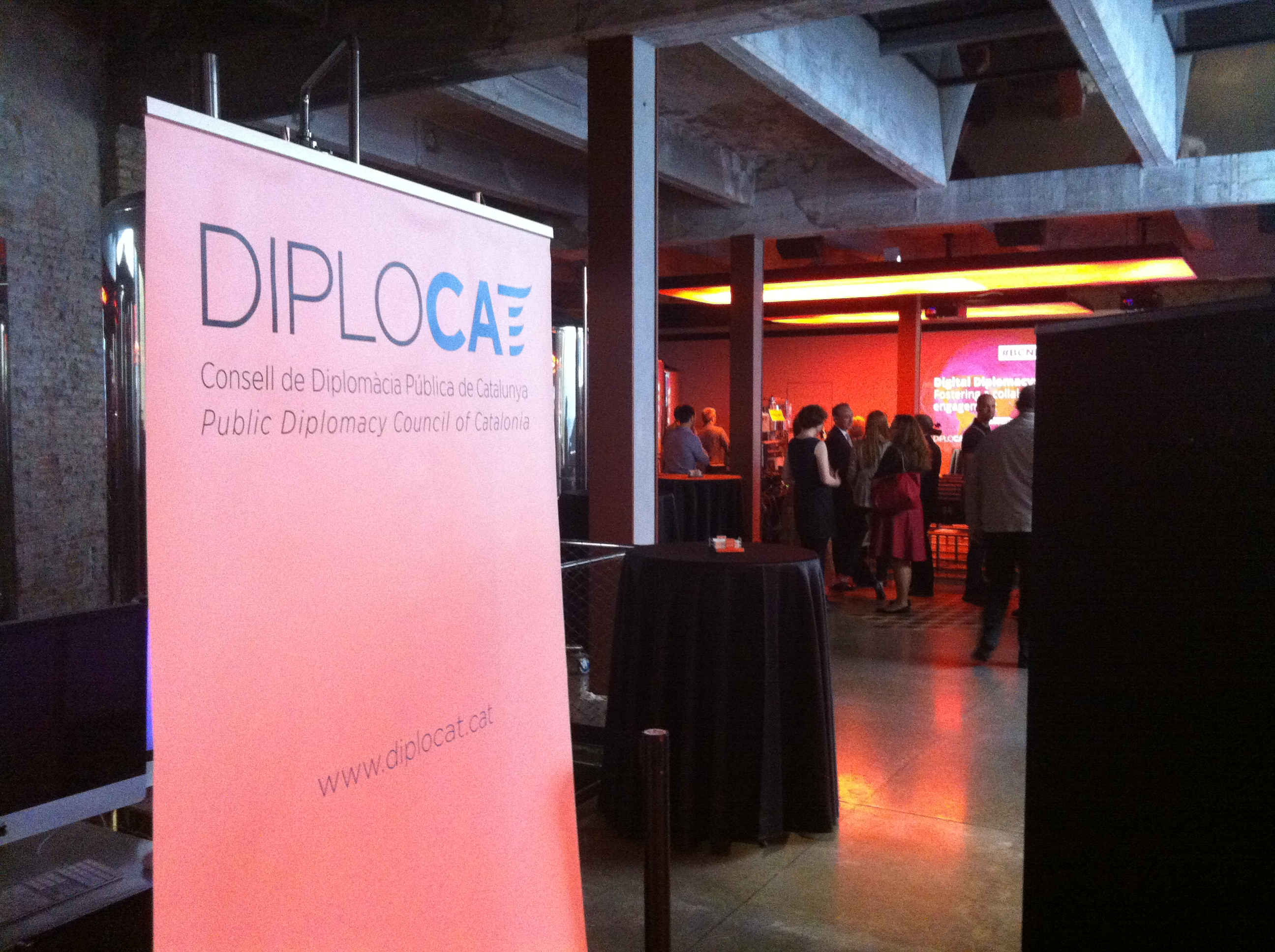
Public Diplomacy Meeting in Barcelona

Under the leadership of Albert Royo i Mariné DIPLOCAT organized academic events to discuss both internationally relevant topics within Catalonia with international guests and the Catalan independence process in universities around the world. Examples of these events include debates in Lisbon, Utrecht, Oslo, Cambridge, Princeton, Sciences Po Paris, Stockholm and Tokyo.

DIPLOCAT also organized public events in Catalonia itself. In that sense, Diplocat invited Jeremy Rifkin to talk about the possibilities for Catalonia to implement the third industrial revolution, and also organized an international forum in Barcelona about reception and integration of refugees in the European Union.

It also published articles in international press to explain the political situation in Catalonia; awards grants; organized an executive master's degree in diplomacy and foreign affairs; organized meetings with foreign members of parliaments to promote debate on the question of the "right to decide"; invited well-known figures from different fields of work or studies to visit Catalonia; participated in electoral observation missions; aided civil society organizations carrying out activities abroad; prepared informative documents explaining key aspects of everything related to Catalonia; and carried out digital diplomacy with activity on social networks - especially Twitter.

DIPLOCAT also carried out activities in the field of cultural diplomacy, such as the #BooksAndRoses campaign, which promotes giving roses and books in and around April 23, when Sant Jordi is celebrated in Catalonia, or supporting documentaries such as the one about the 40 years of Dutch soccer player Johann Cruyff in Catalonia.

DIPLOCAT also gave the annual Catalan Business Diplomacy Award, aimed at recognizing those companies which identify themselves or their products and services as Catalan. The award was first created in 2013 by DIPLOCAT working together with PIMEC. It was won by Aranow (2013), Scytl (2014), Moritz (2015), Ultramàgic (2016) and Beabloo (2017).

=== Impact in international journalism ===
The presence of DIPLOCAT until 2017 has been acknowledged to improve the positive perceptions on Catalonia of the international journalists who had previously established contact with the consortium. Moreover, there is a correlation between the professional needs of correspondents (information sources and materials) and the Public Diplomacy activities being provided by DIPLOCAT.

== Activities since 2018 ==
One of the first activities held by Diplocat once reactivated was a seminar on public diplomacy in Barcelona in which professor Nicholas Cull gave the key speech. In that conference the new secretary general Ms. Laura Foraster said that DIPLOCAT's goals are to export "the image, assets and values of Catalonia abroad". In a later interview she said that DIPLOCAT has now a new vision and mission with a new way of working making the most of its cross cutting structure as a partnership.

DIPLOCAT currently has three pillars of activities, connect, project, and empower. Examples of connecting with foreign audiences would be inviting international visitors, organizing seminars and exchanging best practices, such as with the OECD and the Council of Europe to learn about innovative policies for local councils. Projecting the image of Catalonia, one example would be the task of promoting the Catalan day of Books and Roses abroad every spring through a specific webpage and specific activities, such as organising debates with foreign booksellers and journalists, co-organising cultural events in New York or by sending books and roses to relevant foreign cultural and political personalities. The Catalan Business Diplomacy Award was restored and the company Munich was awarded in 2019. DIPLOCAT empowers Catalan local actors with specific courses, such as in science and technology diplomacy and also with a scholarship program to conduct international studies.

DIPLOCAT changed its name to Catalonia International in July 2024. The rebranding of the consortium followed the approval of new statutes, updating those of 2012, and it was also an effort to modernize its identity, while respecting at the same time a 2020 Spanish Constitutional Court ruling that banned the use of the term "public diplomacy" to describe DIPLOCAT's activities.

== Composition ==
The following public bodies constitute the consortium:

Public institutions

- Generalitat de Catalunya (Catalan government)
- City halls of Barcelona, Girona, Lleida, Tarragona and Vielha e Mijaran
- Catalan association of municipalities and counties (Associació Catalana de Municipis i Comarques)
- Federation of the municipalities of Catalonia (Federació de Municipis de Catalunya)

Financial, economic and business bodies

- Federation of Catalan savings banks (Federació Catalana de Caixes d'Estalvis)
- General Board of the Chambers of Commerce, Industry and Navigation of Catalonia
- Association of small and medium-sized businesses (PIMEC)
- Employers' association (Foment del Treball Nacional)
- Multi-sector business association
- Foundation of private businesses (FemCAT)
- Confederation of Catalan cooperatives
- Comisiones Obreras de Catalunya (trade union)
- Unión General de Trabajadores de Catalunya (trade union)

Social and sport bodies

- Federation of Catalan third sector social bodies (Taula d'Entitats del Tercer Sector Social de Catalunya)
- FB Barcelona

Universities, business schools and academic centres

- Universities of Catalunya
- EADA Business School
- Barcelona Graduate School of Economics (BGSE)
- Barcelona Institute of International Studies (Institut Barcelona d'Estudis Internacionals IBEI)
