= Covfefe =

Word used by Donald Trump on Twitter

Avatar of Donald J. Trump

Donald J. Trump
(@realDonaldTrump)
tweeted:

Despite the constant negative press covfefe

May 31, 2017, 12:06 a.m.

Covfefe (/koʊˈfɛfi/ koh-FEF-ee) is a word, widely presumed to be a typographical error, that Donald Trump used in a tweet during his first term as President of the United States. It quickly became an Internet meme.

Six minutes after midnight (EDT) on May 31, 2017, Trump tweeted "Despite the constant negative press covfefe". He deleted the tweet six hours later.

Many media outlets presumed that he had meant to type "coverage". Sean Spicer, then White House press secretary, stated: "I think the president and a small group of people know exactly what he meant."

== Initial tweet and public response ==
The tweet attracted intense attention in the news and on social media, quickly becoming a viral phenomenon. Both the word and tweet produced a variety of cultural, economic, and social influences. For example, the Volfefe index (for "volatility" and "covfefe"), created by JPMorgan Chase in 2019, measured the impact of President Trump's tweets on the U.S. bond yields. "Covfefe" was one of Trump's most famous tweets.

"Covfefe" quickly generated jokes and media speculation about its meaning. It was retweeted more than 105,000 times, garnered more than 148,000 likes, and engendered Internet memes on the morning of May 31. The hashtag #covfefe had been used on the Internet 1.4 million times within 24 hours of Trump's tweet.

Trump never acknowledged that the tweet was a misprint. He instead tweeted again at 06:09 after deleting the original tweet: "Who can figure out the true meaning of 'covfefe' ??? Enjoy!" White House press secretary Sean Spicer implied later that day that the tweet was not a typo but rather intentional: "I think the president and a small group of people know exactly what he meant." The Google Search term "covfefe" surpassed the search term "Paris climate" (in reference to the 2015 Paris Climate agreement) on May 31, the same day Trump indicated that the U.S. would withdraw from the agreement.

Trump referenced the word in May 2018 by pronouncing it in a White House video about the auditory illusion Yanny or Laurel. He joked near the end of the video: "I hear 'covfefe'."

An analyst for The Washington Post, Philip Bump, wrote in July 2019 that the covfefe tweet represented Trump's refusal to admit even minor misstatements. Other critics in the media expressed similar opinions.

== Subsequent references ==
Writing for The Atlantic in January 2019, journalist Adrienne LaFrance summarized the significance of the covfefe tweet: "Covfefe remains the tweet that best illustrates Trump's most preternatural gift: He knows how to captivate people, how to command, and divert the attention of the masses."

The covfefe meme produced a variety of follow-up effects in culture, language, and business. While marking the first anniversary of the covfefe tweet in May 2018, a USA Today article noted: "But did the president know what he had wrought on U.S. culture? The memes. The songs. The jokes."

=== In language and politics ===
The word game Words with Friends added "covfefe" to its dictionary in June 2017.

Dictionary.com announced that "covfefe" topped its list of "unmatched queries" in October 2017 and continued to have the most user searches for a word without an entry. Brewer's Dictionary of Phrase and Fable added an entry for "covfefe" to its 20th edition in October 2018.

Lake Superior State University included "covfefe" in its 43rd annual edition of "List of Words Banished from the Queen's English for Misuse, Overuse, and General Uselessness" in December 2017. The university's spokesperson noted that the word "became shorthand for a social media mistake".

Subsequent misspellings and mis-speakings by Trump have been compared in the media to the covfefe tweet. "Covfefe" is also often invoked when discussing gaffes made by other public figures, businesses, and organizations in public discourse.

Other uses of "covfefe" involve word play on similarity with the word "coffee". Examples include a coffee shop called "Covfefe Café", a beer called "'No Collusion' Russian Imperial Coffee 'Covfefe' Stout", various covfefe coffee drinks, an alcoholic coffee cocktail "Covfefe", a coffee and tea ad by Amul, etc.

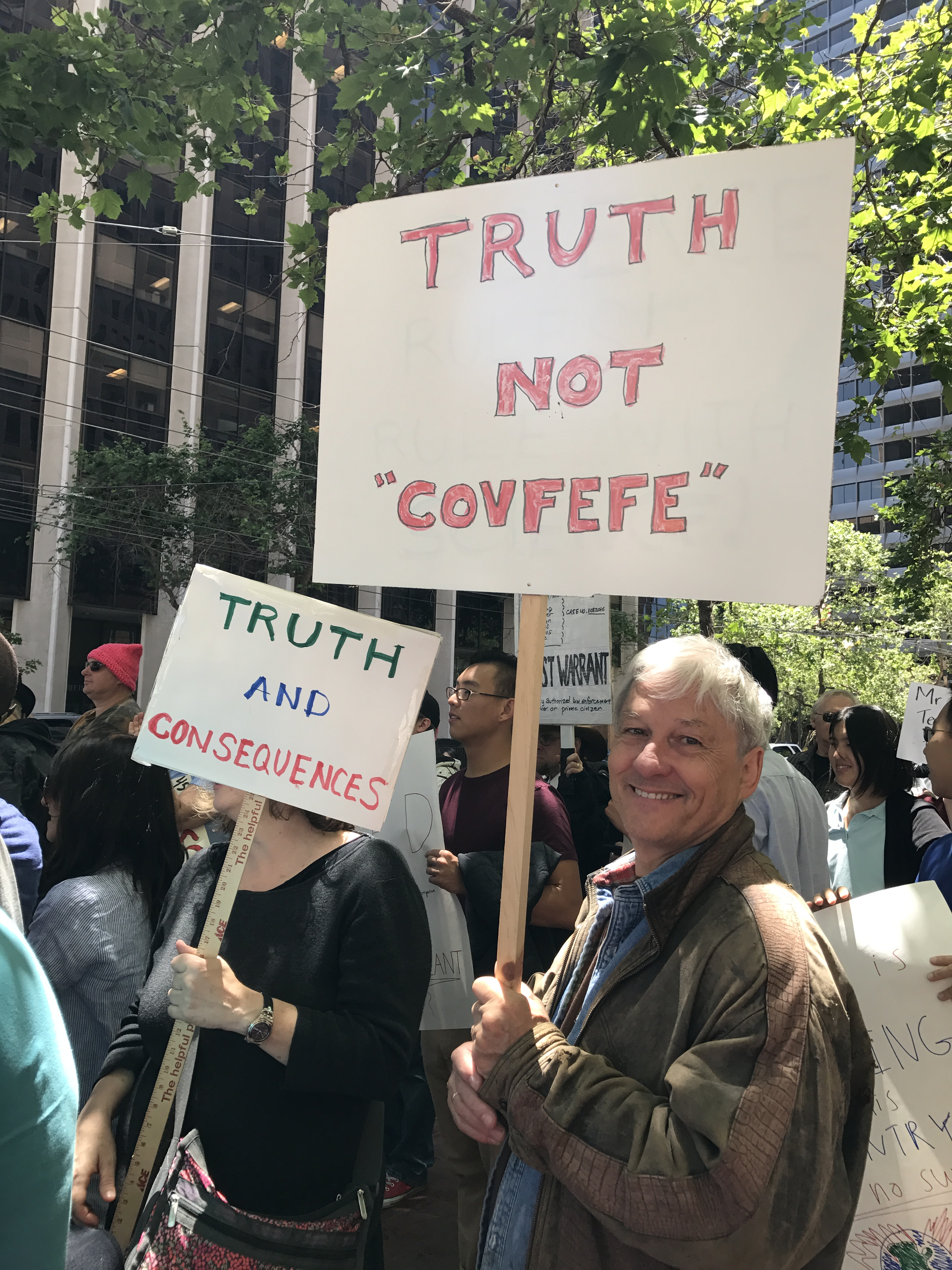
A protester holding a "Truth not 'Covfefe'" sign

Anti-Trump protesters at various events in 2019 also used signs featuring variations on the covfefe theme.

=== In law ===
U.S. Representative Mike Quigley (D-IL 5) introduced H.R. 2884, "The Communications Over Various Feeds Electronically for Engagement Act (COVFEFE Act)" on June 12, 2017. It would have required the National Archives to preserve and store social media posts by the President of the United States. The bill was referred to the House Committee on Oversight and Government Reform on the same day but saw no further congressional action. Regardless, Trump's tweets have been archived in accordance with the Presidential and Federal Records Act Amendments of 2014.

=== In business and commerce ===
The covfefe tweet quickly spawned a variety of merchandise items (e.g., T-shirts, coffee mugs, hats, and bags) bearing covfefe-related inscriptions.

Both supporters and opponents of Trump in 21 U.S. states obtained customized "Covfefe" license plates by February 2018. The state of Georgia prohibits use of the word on vanity license plates.

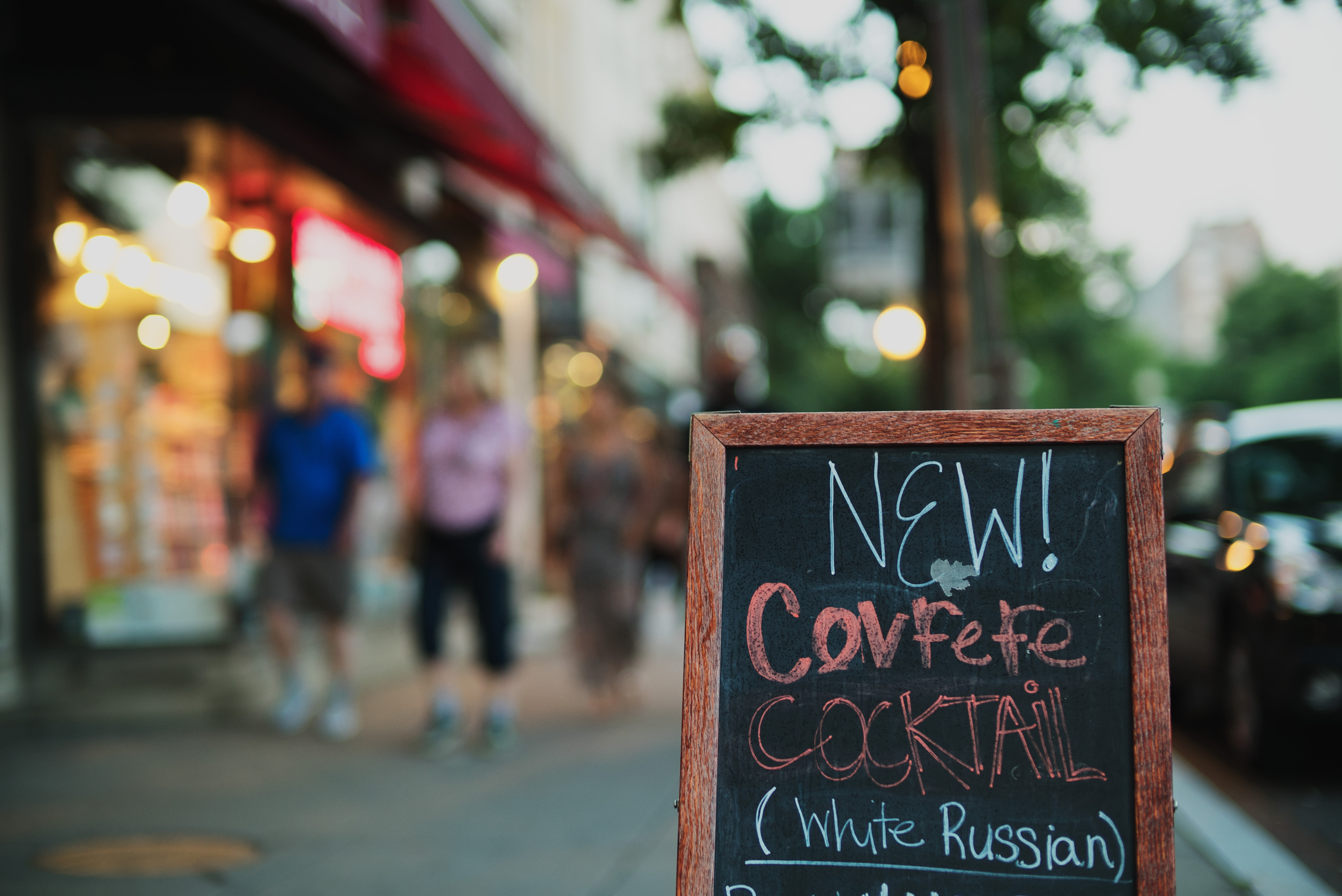
A coffee shop sign advertising a White Russian cocktail, labelled as "Covfefe cocktail", possibly a reference to Russian interference in Trump's election

A 2018 Google Chrome extension called Covfefe allows Twitter users to correct misspellings in their earlier tweets.

Upholding the denial of one such application, a January 2019 decision by Trademark Trial and Appeal Board of the USPTO concluded that the word "covfefe" was too commonly used in a variety of contexts and therefore cannot be trademarked for any specific product. At least 40 trademark applications have been filed with the United States Patent and Trademark Office for various kinds of covfefe-themed merchandise; none of those applications have been granted as of March 2019.

Using inspiration from the covfefe tweet, JPMorgan Chase created a "Volfefe index" in September 2019 to measure the impact of Trump's tweets on the U.S. bond yields. The name "volfefe" is a portmanteau of the words "volatility" and "covfefe".

=== In horse racing ===
A bay filly born in 2016, named Covfefe, won several graded stakes races in 2018 and 2019, including the 2019 Breeders' Cup Filly & Mare Sprint. She earned more than one million USD.

=== In literature, art, and entertainment ===
A project of The Daily Show, the Donald J. Trump Presidential Twitter Library, features a piece dedicated to covfefe.

Alec Baldwin portrayed Trump on Saturday Night Live's "At Home" edition on April 11, 2020, to discuss the ongoing COVID-19 pandemic, referring to it as "Covfefe-19" while drinking Clorox bleach that he called "COVID juice".

=== Truth Social ===
Avatar of Donald J. Trump

Donald J. Trump
(@realDonaldTrump)
tweeted:

Bela

August 17, 2025, 8:31 a.m.

Avatar of Donald J. Trump

Donald J. Trump
(@realDonaldTrump)
tweeted:

South Carerdddd

October 29, 2025, 8:43 a.m.

Following the creation of Trump's own social network Truth Social, he has stated that he will remain on Truth Social as his primary social media platform. On April 29, 2022, Trump used the Covfefe meme in his second post to Truth Social, posting the message "I'M BACK! #COVFEFE".

During his second presidency, Trump made a Truth Social post on August 17, 2025, which read "Bela", and another at 8:43 AM on October 29, 2025, saying only "South Carerdddd". Both posts were compared to the covfefe tweet.

== See also ==
- Bushisms
- Donald Trump on social media
- Hapax legomenon
- Hurricane Dorian–Alabama controversy
- List of Internet phenomena
- Use of Twitter by public figures
