= Digital diplomacy =

Use of digital tools for diplomatic engagement

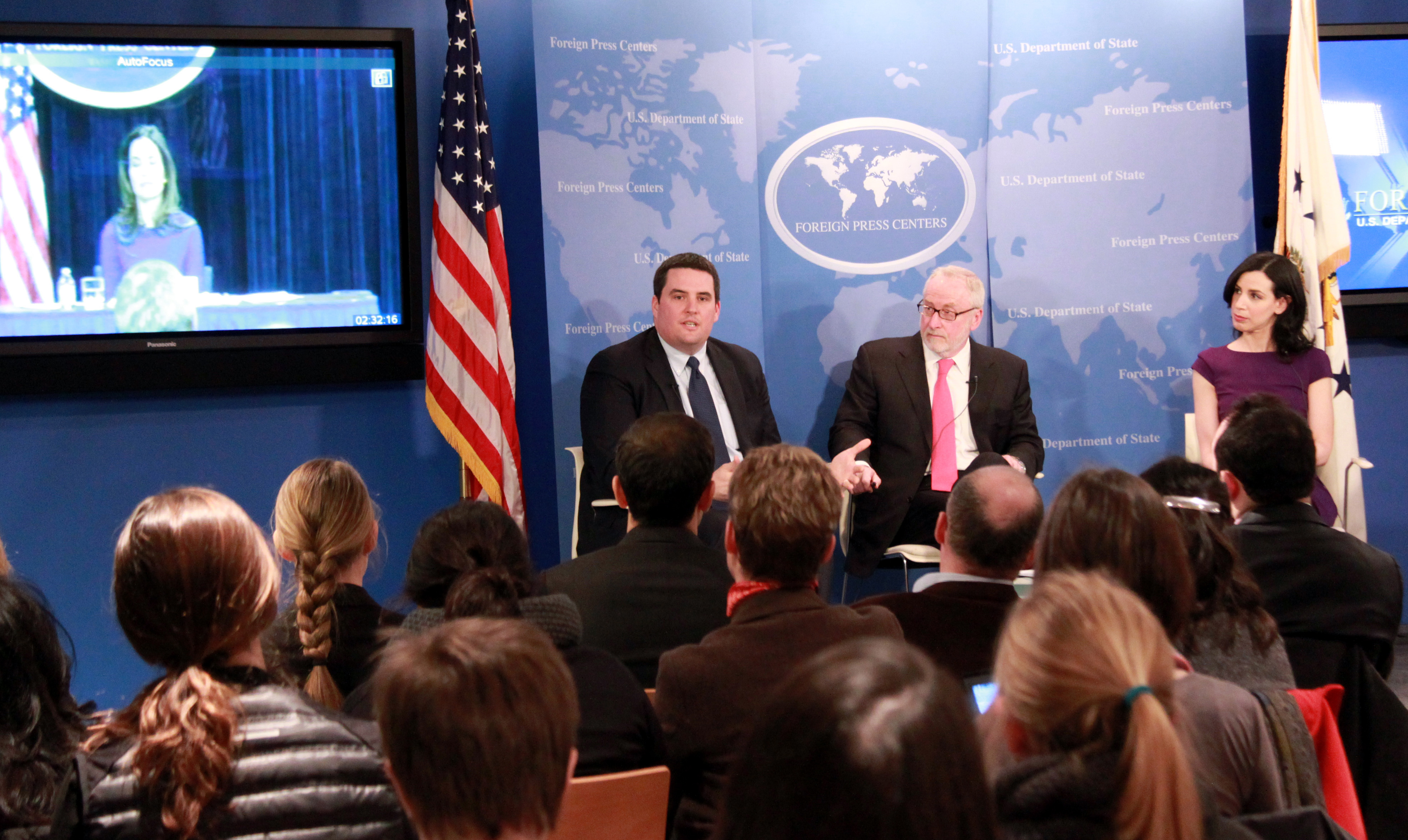
Coordinator of Bureau of International Information Programs Macon Phillips (left), responds to a question during a panel discussion -- Digital Diplomacy: Making Foreign Policy Less Foreign -- with Assistant Secretary of State for Public Affairs Doug Frantz (center), and Assistant Secretary for Education and Cultural Affairs Evan Ryan, who joined via digital video conference, on February 18, 2014. Moderated by Emily Parker, author of Now I Know Who My Comrades Are: Voices From the Internet Underground and digital diplomacy advisor and senior fellow at the New America Foundation, the panel discussion is part of Social Media Week New York City.

Digital diplomacy, also referred to as digiplomacy and eDiplomacy (see below), has been defined as the use of the Internet and new information communication technologies to help achieve diplomatic objectives. However, other definitions have also been proposed. The definition focuses on the interplay between internet and diplomacy, ranging from Internet driven-changes in the environment in which diplomacy is conducted to the emergence of new topics on diplomatic agendas such as cybersecurity, privacy and more, along with the use of internet tools to practice diplomacy.

Platform-specific terms that have also evolved in this diplomacy category include Facebook diplomacy, Twitter diplomacy, and Google diplomacy.

== Overview ==
The UK Foreign and Commonwealth Office defines digital diplomacy as 'solving foreign policy problems using the internet', a narrower definition that excludes internal electronic collaboration tools and mobile phone and tablet-based diplomacy. The US State Department uses the term 21st Century Statecraft The Canadian Department of Foreign Affairs, Trade and Development calls it Open Policy.

Digital diplomacy can be practiced by state agencies such as Foreign Ministries, embassies and consulates, individual diplomats such as ambassadors or ambassadors-at-large, and non-state actors such as civil society and human rights groups.

Digital technologies are also used in internal and multilateral diplomatic coordination. A 2022 study of diplomats in embassies and permanent representations in Geneva found that WhatsApp groups were used to coordinate initiatives at multilateral forums, communicate more rapidly with headquarters, and remain informed about organizational developments at home. The study also found that these digital practices complemented rather than simply replaced face-to-face diplomatic interaction.

Digitalization also affects diplomatic negotiations. Research on negotiations in digital contexts examine how mobile phones, screens, social media applications, and virtual or hybrid formats interact with established diplomatic norms and procedures. Scholars have also emphasized the role of diplomats' digital competencies and shared institutional norms in shaping negotiations in digital settings.

== History ==
The first foreign ministry to establish a dedicated ediplomacy unit was the US State Department, which created the Taskforce on eDiplomacy in 2002. This Taskforce was renamed the Office of eDiplomacy and had at times up to about 80 staff members, about half of which were dedicated to ediplomacy-related work. In April 2022 the US State Department set up a new Bureau of Cyberspace and Digital Policy (CDP). Although there is no generally accepted definition, "in this report, we consider 'cyber diplomacy' to be efforts that support U.S. interests in cyberspace internationally, led by the Department of State." Indeed, the new CDP bureau brings together the many disparate initiatives set up under the Obama Administration under the hyphenated term United States cyber-diplomacy encompassing Hillary Clinton's 21st century statecraft.

Other foreign ministries have also begun to embrace ediplomacy. The UK Foreign and Commonwealth Office began to develop a digital diplomacy strategy in 2008 and now has an Office of Digital Diplomacy that is involved in a range of ediplomacy activities. Sweden has also been active in promotion of digital diplomacy, especially through the online communication strategy of its foreign minister Carl Bildt who soon became 'best connected Twitter leader'.

In July 2012, global public relations and communications firm Burson-Marsteller studied the use of Twitter by heads of state and government, referred to as Twitter diplomacy. The study on Twiplomacy found that there were 264 Twitter accounts of heads of state and government and their institutions in 125 countries worldwide and that only 30 leader's tweet personally. Since then, the attention on digital diplomacy as a tool of public diplomacy has only increased. In 2013, USC Center on Public Diplomacy has named 'Facebook recognizing Kosovo as a country', as one of the top moments in public diplomacy for 2013.

In 2014, the Swedish Ministry of Foreign Affairs hosted the Stockholm Initiative for Digital Diplomacy conference. The initiative evolved into informal online campaigns under the umbrella #DiplomacyUnited, coordinating the work of a dozen embassies in Washington, D.C.

China has emerged as one of the most active and strategically deliberate practitioners of digital diplomacy. While domestic platforms such as Weibo remain tightly regulated, Beijing's Ministry of Foreign Affairs and state media have pursued an assertive presence on Western platforms including Twitter/X, Facebook, and YouTube to shape international narratives and counter what officials describe as distorted foreign coverage of China. At the same time, China has increasingly leveraged decentralized, entertainment-driven content, including foreign influencers and platforms such as TikTok and RedNote, to promote a more accessible image of the country.

According to the Twiplomacy Study 2020, published in July 2020, 98 percent of UN member states had a diplomatic presence on Twitter. Only Laos, North Korea, Sao Tome and Principe and Turkmenistan lacked representation on the social network.

== Facebook diplomacy ==
Facebook diplomacy is a user created hybrid of public diplomacy and citizen diplomacy as applied in the Facebook social networking platform. After some earlier informal use the term Facebook diplomacy was described at a New York conference on social networking and technology in December 2008.

During the December conference in New York, the United States Undersecretary of Public Diplomacy, James Glassman said, "New technology gives the United States and other free nations a significant advantage over terrorists." In his presentation at New York's Columbia University Law School, he went on to illustrate how Facebook diplomacy and on-line activism created success through the use of Facebook groups and the use of the platform to create activism and cause global awareness relative to issues in Colombia against the infamous FARC rebels.

== Opportunities in digital diplomacy ==
The rise of social media as a tool in diplomacy has given way for states to strike up two-way or “dialogic" communication with other diplomatic actors and their foreign publics, compared to the one-way nature of traditional public diplomacy. While traditional diplomacy occurs offline in relative privacy, online diplomacy has allowed a multitude of actors to discuss foreign policy-making, increasing the impact of public opinion on the foreign policy agenda.

This method of diplomacy provides additional avenues for other actors to engage in co-creation with influential people and organizations on multilateral diplomatic campaigns. An example of this would be the 2012-2014 Campaign to End Sexual Violence in Conflict launched by then British foreign secretary William Hague, which used a multi-channel digital and offline approach to engage UN organizations as well as states. A video featuring co-created content by Angelina Jolie, a UN Special Envoy, supporting the campaign managed to attract 15,000 views, compared to the foreign secretary’s similar video, which only attracted 400 views.

This ability for states to listen to their audiences' perceptions of their foreign policy is considered another potential benefit of digital diplomacy. It can provide a new means for states who have severed formal diplomatic ties to collect information about each other’s foreign policy positions. For example, despite the states' strained diplomatic relationship, the U.S. State Department follows the Iranian president on Twitter.

Access to social media as a diplomatic channel has also changed the relative influence of diplomatic actors from states thought to possess little hard power – or power achieved through material resources strength – amongst other diplomatic actors. A study done by Ilan Manor and Elad Segev in 2020 measured the social media mobility of ministries of foreign affairs and UN missions to New York, finding that states with less hard power could use social media to become “supernodes” in online diplomatic networks. This is also referred to this as the “theory of networked diplomacy”.

== Challenges in digital diplomacy ==
Though states have managed to achieve diplomatic prominence online through their use of Twitter and other online channels, these new diplomatic channels do not come without risks. Messages and images shared on social media platforms, particularly Twitter, have already given rise to diplomatic crises.

In 2018, Global Affairs Canada tweeted a statement calling on Saudi Arabia to release imprisoned human rights activists. In response, Saudi Arabia cut diplomatic and trade ties with Canada, declaring the country’s ambassador persona non grata and recalling Saudi Arabia's ambassador to Canada.

The incident escalated when a pro-government Twitter account later tweeted an image of an Air Canada plane flying in the direction of Toronto’s CN Tower, with the text, “He who interferes with what doesn’t concern him finds what doesn’t please him.” The image incited criticism from many on social media due to perceived parallels between the image and the September 11, 2001 attacks in the United States.

Digital platforms have also enabled the spread of disinformation used to undermine states’ international and domestic stability, such as the interference of the Russian government in the 2016 U.S. presidential election.

== See also ==
- Alliance Française
- British Council
- Cultural Diplomacy
- E-government
- Government by algorithm
- Office of eDiplomacy (US)
- Open government
- Public diplomacy
- Public Diplomacy Council of Catalonia
- Twitter diplomacy
- United States cyber-diplomacy
- USC Center on Public Diplomacy
