= Buy a shotgun =

2013 phrase by Joe Biden

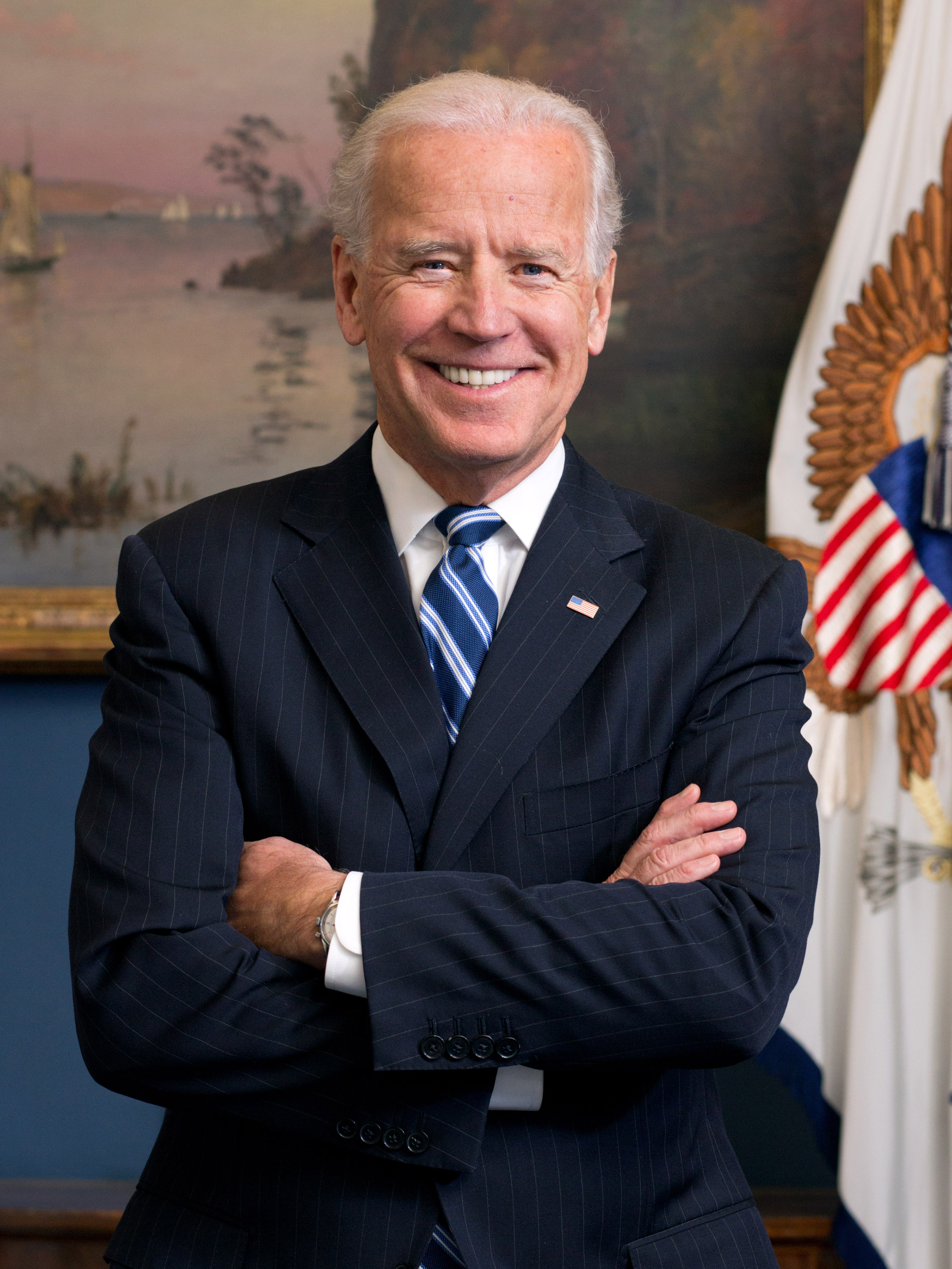
Joe Biden (pictured) advised the use of a shotgun for home defense over a rifle in 2013.

"Buy a shotgun" is a phrase spoken by then Vice-President of the United States Joe Biden during a video question and answer session hosted by Parents Magazine in 2013. During the session, Biden questioned the utility of a semi-automatic rifle as a home defense weapon, suggesting a shotgun was more appropriate. He went on to explain that he owned two shotguns and had advised the Second Lady of the United States, Jill Biden, to use one of them to "fire two blasts" should she feel threatened by someone or something. The advice later became a subject of interest in social media and popular culture.

== Background ==
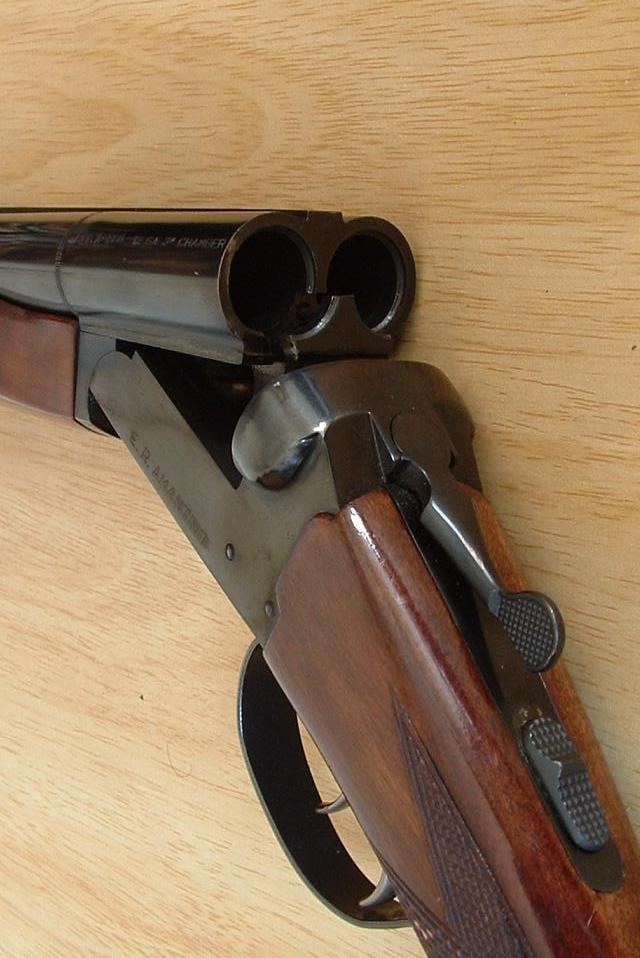
A view of a double-barreled shotgun

=== Early 2013 comments on shotguns ===
In January 2013, during an interactive chat session on the social networking site Google+, then vice-president of the United States Joe Biden responded to a question about personal protection in the wake of a natural disaster by explaining the prudence in buying "some shotgun shells" to repel looters.

"You know, it's harder to use an assault weapon to hit something than it is a shotgun, OK. So if you want to keep people away in an earthquake, buy some shotgun shells."

The following month, Biden was interviewed by Field & Stream, during which he said ownership of semi-automatic rifles was unnecessary for persons who owned shotguns since they would be able "to keep someone away" from their home by firing "the shotgun through the door". The interview was published on February 25, though conducted earlier in the month.

=== "Buy a shotgun" ===
Later, on February 19, Biden hosted a question and answer session with Parents Magazine on the social networking site Facebook. During the session, the topic of gun control was raised. Biden noted that he personally owned two shotguns and had advised Jill Biden that "if there's ever a problem" to walk outside their home and "fire two blasts". Biden also explained that he felt shotguns were more appropriate for personal security than an AR-15 which, he said, was more difficult to aim and use. He concluded by stating, "Buy a shotgun! Buy a shotgun!"

=== Later Biden comments on shotguns ===
In 2020, responding to criticism from a Detroit autoworker who confronted him about gun control policies, Biden explained his two shotguns were in calibers 12-gauge and 20-gauge.

== Reaction ==
=== Social media response ===
Biden's remarks during his Facebook session, according to CNN, "unleashed a torrent of online reaction" on social media.

=== Legal analysis ===
The Wilmington, Delaware police department – in whose jurisdiction it is believed Biden's shotguns were stored (Note: While Biden owned a home in Wilmington, he was permanently resident at the time of his comments at Number One Observatory Circle in Washington, D.C. Media noted that it was unlikely Biden had stored shotguns at the official vice-presidential residence for use in repelling intruders as that building was already protected by the U.S. Secret Service and he was most likely referring to his Wilmington property.) – advised that it was illegal for residents to discharge firearms on their property unless "you really feel that your life is being threatened". Former Delaware deputy attorney general John Garey also advised residents not to follow Biden's advice to "fire two blasts" due to Delaware self-defense statutes which required a person have a reasonable fear of "imminent death" before resorting to deadly force. Some gun rights advocates also opined that they felt Biden's advice was legally reckless.

Kathleen Jennings, a prosecutor at the Delaware Department of Justice, disagreed with assessments that Biden's advice was unsound noting that "in Delaware, a person can legally fire a weapon to protect themselves and others from someone intruding onto her dwelling". Questioned by The Washington Post whether her reading of the law was colored by the fact that Biden's son, Beau Biden, was at the time the head of the Delaware Department of Justice, Jennings rejected the suggestion and noted she had spent 32 years as both a prosecutor and a criminal defense attorney.

=== Security assessment ===
Regarding the efficacy of a shotgun as a personal security device, Jeff Johnston wrote in American Hunter that "Biden had it partially right when he said shotguns are good for self-defense," but objected to Biden's specific advice to use a double-barreled shotgun.

=== "Joe Biden defense" ===
A Washington state man was put on trial in November 2013 for illegal discharge of a firearm after he fired a shotgun blast to deter car thieves on his property the previous summer. During his trial, the man pleaded in his defense that "I did what Joe Biden told me to do" but was convicted in a jury trial nonetheless. The defense claim was later referred to by some media as the "Joe Biden defense".

== In popular culture ==
- Biden's comments were remixed by The Gregory Brothers with Darren Criss into a song titled "Buy a Shotgun" which was released on YouTube in August 2013.
- The use of the so-called "Joe Biden defense" in Washington state became the subject of a two-minute comedy bit on The Daily Show with Jon Stewart.

== See also ==
- Covfefe
