= Yanny or Laurel =

Viral auditory illusion

Yanny or Laurel?
The disputed audio recording that went viral on Twitter

Yanny or Laurel is an auditory illusion that became popular in May 2018, in which a short audio recording of speech can be heard as one of two words. 53 percent of over 500,000 respondents to a Twitter poll reported hearing a man saying the word "Laurel", while 47 percent of people reported hearing a voice saying the name "Yanny". Analysis of the sound frequencies has confirmed that both sets of sounds are present in the mixed recording, but some users focus on the higher-frequency sounds in "Yanny" and cannot seem to hear the lower sounds of the word "Laurel".

== Background ==
The mixed re-recording was created by students who played the sound of the word "laurel" while re-recording the playback amid background noise in the room. The audio clip of the main word "laurel" originated in 2007 from a recording of opera singer Jay Aubrey Jones, who spoke the word "laurel" as one of 200,000 reference pronunciations produced and published by vocabulary.com in 2007. The clip was made at Jones' home using a laptop and microphone, with acoustic foam to soundproof the recording. The discovery of the ambiguity phenomenon is attributed to Katie Hetzel, a 15-year-old freshman at Flowery Branch High School in Flowery Branch, Georgia, who posted a description publicly on Instagram on May 11, 2018. The illusion reached further popularity the next day when it was posted to Reddit, where it was picked up by YouTuber Cloe Feldman, who subsequently posted about it on her Twitter account.

== Pop culture ==
Notable individuals who responded to the auditory illusion included Ellen DeGeneres, Stephen King, and Chrissy Teigen. Musicians Laurel Halo and Yanni, whose names are similar to those given in the auditory illusion, also responded. In a video released by the White House, various members of the Trump administration reacted to the meme, and President Donald Trump said, "I hear covfefe", as a reference to his "covfefe" tweet the previous year.

In The Guardian, the clip was compared to the 2015 gold/blue dress controversy. Several days after the clip became popular, the team at Vocabulary.com added a separate entry for the word "Yanny", which contained an audio clip identical to "Laurel". Its definition is about the Internet trend.

== Scientific analysis ==
On May 16, 2018, a report in The New York Times noted a spectrogram analysis that confirmed how the extra sounds for "yanny" can be graphed in the mixed re-recording. The sounds were also simulated by combining syllables of the same Vocabulary.com voice saying the words "Yangtze" and "uncanny" as a mash-up of sounds which gave a similar spectrogram as the extra sounds graphed in the laurel re-recording.

Benjamin Munson, a professor of audiology at the University of Minnesota, suggested that "Yanny" can be heard in higher frequencies while "Laurel" can be heard in lower frequencies. Older people, whose ability to hear higher frequencies is more likely to have degraded, usually hear "Laurel". Kevin Franck, the director of audiology at the Boston hospital Massachusetts Eye and Ear, says that the clip exists on a "perceptual boundary" and compared it to the Necker cube illusion. David Alais from the University of Sydney's school of psychology also compared the clip to the Necker cube or the face/vase illusion, calling it a "perceptually ambiguous stimulus". Brad Story, a professor of speech, language, and audiology at the University of Arizona said that the low quality of the recording creates ambiguity. Hans Rutger Bosker, psycholinguist and phonetician at the Max Planck Institute for Psycholinguistics, showed that it is possible to make the same person hear the same audio clip differently by presenting it in different acoustic contexts: if one hears the ambiguous audio clip after a lead-in sentence without any high frequencies (>1000 Hz), this makes the higher frequencies in the following ambiguous audio clip stand out more, making people report "Yanny" where they previously may have heard "Laurel".

=== Pitch-shifted versions ===
"Yanny or Laurel" (pitch shifted higher)
By pitch shifting the original audio by 20%, "Laurel" is clearer.

By pitch shifting the original audio to higher or lower frequencies, the same listener can report different interpretations. The New York Times released an interactive tool on their website that changes the pitch of the recording in real-time. The interactive slider allows the recording to be played back at any pitch between three semitones higher (to help the listener hear "Laurel"), and six semitones lower (to help the listener hear "Yanny").

== Similar auditory illusions ==
=== Brainstorm/green needle ===
In May 2018, a similar viral story grew around a video review of a figure of Brainstorm, a character from the Ben 10 franchise. The toy's electronic speech could be heard as either the character's name or the phrase "green needle", depending on which phrase the listener was primed to expect. Others reported hearing "green storm" or "brain needle".

The illusion was attributed to the poor quality of the toy's audio recording. Valerie Hazan, a professor of speech sciences at University College London, said of the video that "When faced with an acoustic signal which is somewhat ambiguous because it is low-quality or noisy, your brain attempts a 'best fit' between what is heard and the expected word."

=== Yes, that sounds like an excellent idea! ===
Another similar audio illusion came from an episode of Sesame Street. In an episode aired in December 2018, Abby Cadabby suggests moving a camera, to which Grover enthusiastically responds, "Yes, that sounds like an excellent idea!" However, J. D. Durkin shared the clip online, saying that it also sounded like he said, "Yes, that's a fucking excellent idea!" This became a trend throughout the month, with users plausibly being able to hear both phrases. In a segment from Jimmy Kimmel Live, a group of children in Los Angeles were shown the clip and were able to pick up on the misheard phrase, with one child saying, "[He said the] f-word. Don't worry, I hear it at home!"

=== Oh, Barbie! ===
A scene from the 2010 animated film Toy Story 3 has also been compared to the Yanny/Laurel phenomenon: a scene where Ken exclaims "Oh, Barbie!" has been reported to be selectively mishearable as "Oh, fuck!"

== See also ==
- List of Internet phenomena
- Malapropism
- McGurk effect
- Mondegreen
