= Volfefe index =

Stock market index

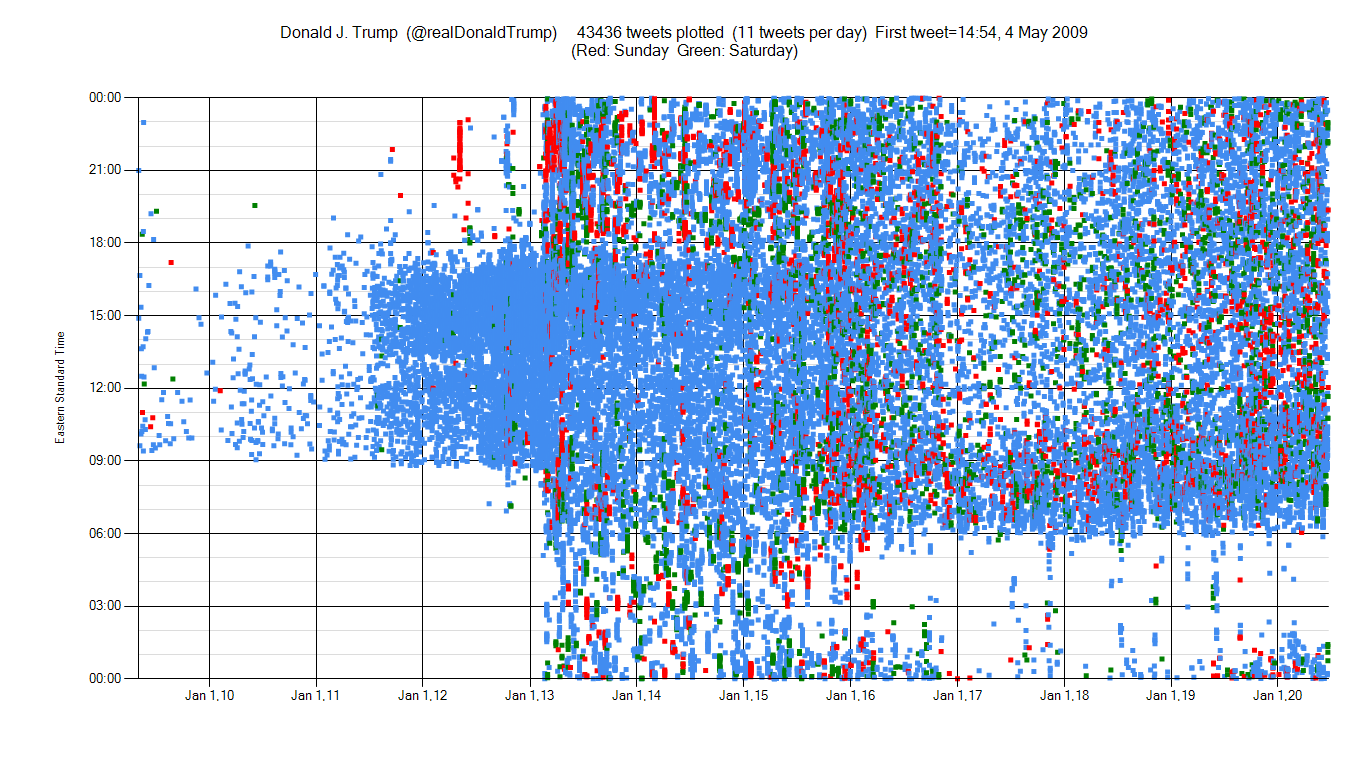
Donald Trump's Twitter activity from his first tweet in May 2009. (Retweets are not included.)

The Volfefe Index was a stock market index of volatility in market sentiment for US Treasury bonds caused by tweets by President Donald Trump.

Bloomberg News observed Volfefe was created due to the statistical significance of Trump tweets on bond prices. ABC News Online posited Volfefe could help analyze interest rate risk in the face of "unpredictable" activity on social media by Trump.

== Etymology ==
The name "Volfefe" is a portmanteau of the words volatility and covfefe, the latter being a word (widely presumed to be a typographical error) posted in a 2017 tweet by Trump.

== Creation ==
Volfefe was launched by JPMorgan Chase on September 9, 2019.

== Methods ==
In forming the basis of the methodology behind Volfefe, JPMorgan Chase used software to analyse the corpus of Trump's tweets. 14,000 tweets were used in the analysis to form the initial projections for their software. Their analysts determined that there were direct correlations between tweets and subsequent market movements. These market movements were most notably evidenced when the tweet specifically references financial matters including the US Federal Reserve. The tweets issued during the working day of the New York Stock Exchange were more likely to cause a change in market sentiment; however, it was noted that the tweets can come at any time of day and thus have an effect on markets around the world. Key words in tweets include "China", "billion", "products", "Democrats", "great", "dollars", "tariffs" and "trade".

== Analysis ==
Bloomberg News noted, "JPMorgan’s 'Volfefe Index,' named after Trump’s mysterious covfefe tweet from May 2017, suggests that the president’s electronic musings are having a statistically significant impact on Treasury yields."

ABC News Online commented JP Morgan created Volfefe, "to measure how much impact Mr Trump's unpredictable tweets have on US interest rates".

== See also ==
- Big Mac Index
- Black swan theory
- Economic Policy Uncertainty Index
- Greed and fear
- Hemline index
- Market trend
- Probability of default
- S&P/ASX 200 VIX
- SKEW
- Twitter diplomacy
- Use of Twitter by public figures
- VIX
- Waffle House Index
