= Moritz (beer) =

Spanish beer brand

Cervezas Moritz, S.A.
- Trade name: Cerveses Moritz
- Company type: Societat Anònima
- Industry: Beverage
- Founded: Barcelona, Spain (1856); 2004
- Founder: Louis Moritz Trautmann
- Headquarters: Barcelona, Catalonia, Spain
- Key people: Daniel Roehrich Moritz (President); Santi Manzano (General Director); Albert Castellón (Strategy)
- Products: Moritz
- Net income: ▲7,999,789.64 € (2008)
- Total assets: 5,092,505.78 € (2008)
- Total equity: 60,101.21 € (2008)
- Number of employees: 120 (2008)
- Website: www.moritz.cat

Moritz is a brand of Catalan beer, with its headquarters on the Ronda Sant Antoni in Barcelona, Catalonia. Unlike its crosstown rival Damm, Moritz markets itself as the only beer brand in the world whose labeling is entirely in the Catalan language. The company was founded in 1856 by an Alsatian immigrant, Louis Moritz Trautmann. After ceasing production in 1978 due to the energy crises, the brand was relaunched in 2004 by Trautmann's descendants.

== Products ==
The Moritz brewery manufactures three beers:

1. Moritz: A pale pilsner made with mineral water from the Font d'Or, pale malts, and Saaz hops.
2. Moritz Epidor: Based on an earlier recipe from 1923, it was relaunched in 2009. A strong pale lager, with an alcohol level of 7.2%.
3. Aigua de Moritz ('Moritz Water'): An alcohol-free version of Moritz.

In addition, the Fàbrica Moritz Barcelona, on the Ronda Sant Antoni, sells "Moritz Fresca", unpasteurized beer brewed on the premises.

== History ==
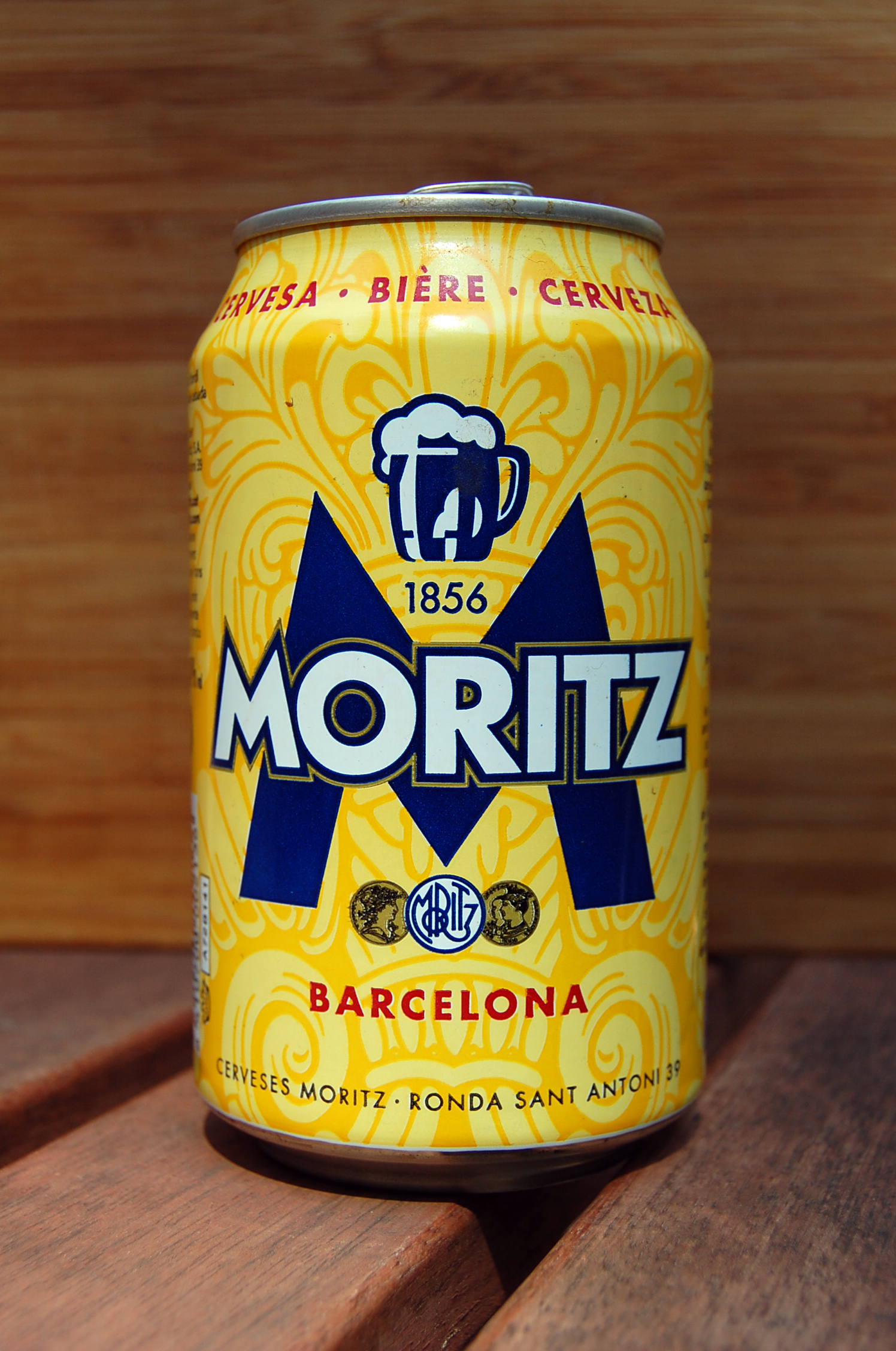
A can of Moritz beer

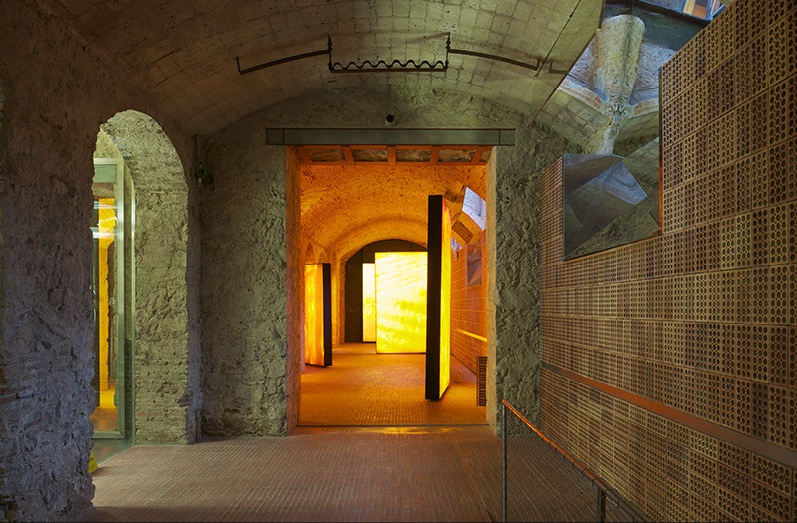
The Moritz brewery

Louis Moritz Trautmann, the company's founder, emigrated to Barcelona from Pfaffenhofen, Alsace, in 1851. By 1856, he was brewing his own beer, and three years later, he bought the brewery of Joan Maurer. Initially, Trautmann used Maurer's brewery, located in the Raval district of Barcelona, on the Carrer del Portal de Santa Madrona. By 1864, the company moved to a larger facility at the nearby Ronda de Sant Antoni, outside the city's walls, which eventually included the "Cervecería Moritz" beer-hall. This factory was in use for a century and was closed in 1966 when production was moved to Parets del Vallès.

Louis Moritz died in 1920, and the company was passed on to his heirs, who named the business "Fábrica de Cervezas Moritz, S.A."

Production was collectivized during the Spanish Civil War. The factory returned to the family by 1939 after the victory of General Franco's troops. An increase in beer consumption in Spain in the early 50s made the company prosper. In 1966, the company bought land for a new factory to meet growing demand, creating Cervezas de Barcelona, S.A. However, with the energy crises that emerged in the 1970s, the company was unable to avoid being dissolved in 1978.

In 2004, the descendants of the Moritz family relaunched the brand with much success. The beer is now produced under license in the brewery La Zaragozana, in Zaragoza (Aragon). The former factory building on the Ronda de Sant Antoni was renovated by Jean Nouvel, and now houses the company's offices, a beer museum, a small showcase brewery, and a tasting bar.

In 2009 the company reopened the famous Bar Velódromo in Barcelona and in 2011 reopened the Moritz Factory, with a modernization project carried out by the Frenchman Jean Nouvel, also responsible for other works in Barcelona such as the Agbar Tower, with a microbrewery where fresh unpasteurized beer is brewed, a brewery-restaurant, the Bar-à-Vins, multipurpose conference rooms and the M-Store, a Moritz product store.
