= Twitter diplomacy =

Use of Twitter/X by diplomats

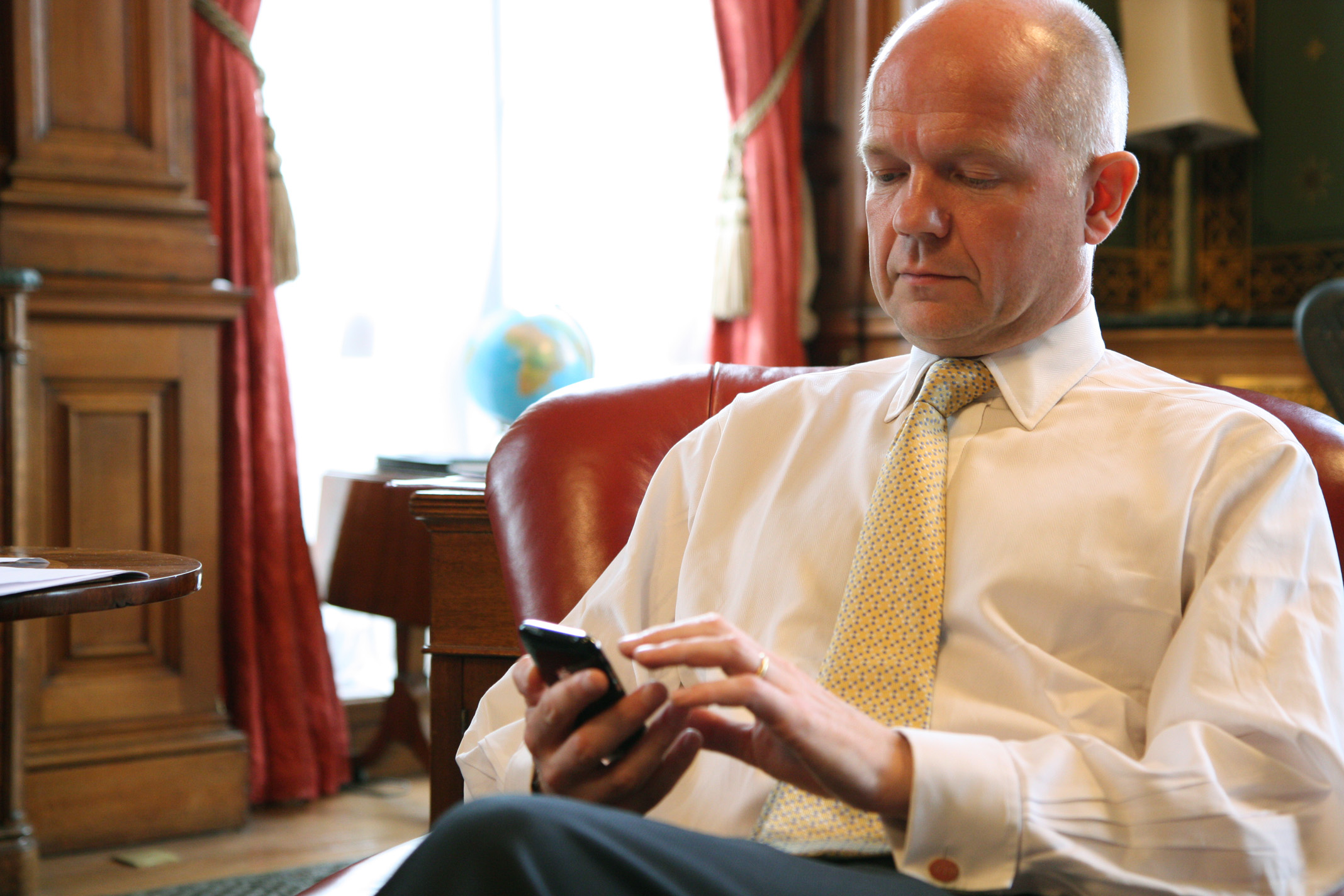
UK Foreign Secretary William Hague answers questions on Afghanistan and Pakistan for his seventh Twitter Q&A, 29 June 2011

Twitter diplomacy and Twiplomacy are terms used to describe the practice of conducting public diplomacy using X (formerly Twitter) by heads of state and diplomats, as well as leaders of intergovernmental organizations (IGOs).

Public officials use X for a wide range of diplomatic communication. This includes, but is not limited to, making official announcements, sharing foreign policy updates, and communicating directly with the public.

== Origins ==
The term Twiplomacy was coined in 2011 in one of the first studies of diplomacy on social networks. The report shows how world leaders use Twitter to maintain diplomatic relations with other leaders and political actors. While the use of Twitter by world leaders and diplomats was on the rise as of April 2014, Twitter diplomacy was only one aspect of the growing trend toward digital diplomacy, also known as Facebook diplomacy, by many world governments.

=== Twitter and diplomacy ===
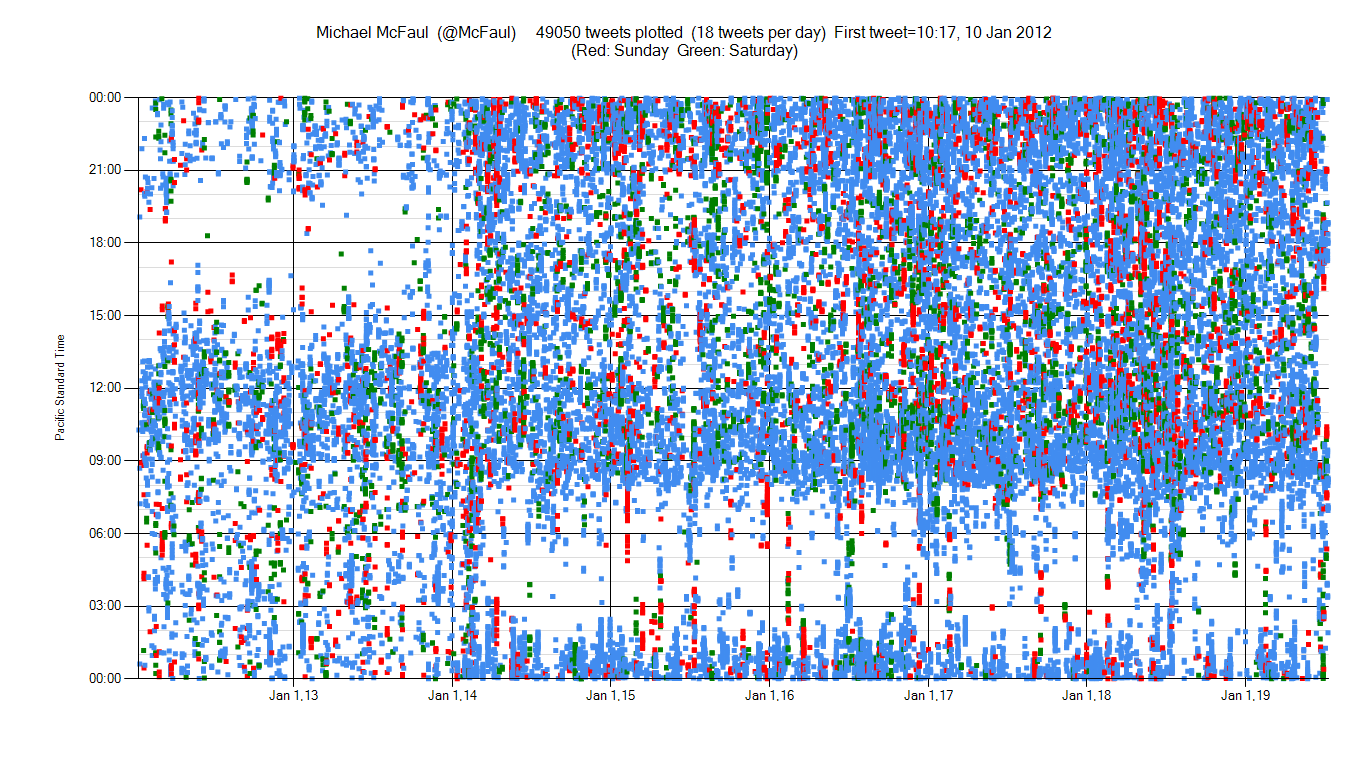
Twitter activity of Michael McFaul. Re-tweets are not included.

As of September 2023, X (formerly known as Twitter) had an estimated 611 million monthly active users.

World leaders and their diplomats have noticed Twitter's rapid expansion and have begun using it to connect with the foreign public and their citizens. After becoming a US ambassador to Russia in 2011, Michael A. McFaul was one of the first diplomats to use Twitter for diplomacy, posting tweets in both English and Russian. According to a 2013 study done by the Twiplomacy website, 153 out of the 193 countries represented at the United Nations had established government Twitter accounts. Additionally, the same study discovered that those accounts amounted to 505 Twitter handles used by world leaders and their foreign ministers. Their collective tweets had the ability to reach a combined audience of over 106 million followers.

Former Italian Foreign Minister Giulio Terzi commented in a 2013 publication on the subject for the Geneva-based non-profit Diplo Foundation, that "social media exposes foreign policymakers to global audiences while at the same time allowing governments to reach them instantly. [...] Twitter has two significant positive effects on foreign policy: it fosters a beneficial exchange of ideas between policymakers and civil society and enhances diplomats' ability to gather information and to anticipate, analyze, manage, and react to events."

=== Controversy ===
In April 2014, tensions between the US State Department and the Russian Ministry of Foreign Affairs over the annexation of Crimea by the Russian Federation devolved into tweets, with both ministries using the hashtag #UnitedforUkraine to convey opposite points of view.

In early 2014, Iranian president Hassan Rouhani decided to delete a controversial tweet relating to the country's nuclear energy program that received media attention.

== Use by governments and intergovernmental organizations ==
Twiplomacy's 2013 study provided new insight into the use of Twitter by governments. Twitter registration by region (as of 2013) included:

- Africa: 71% of governments
- Asia: 75% of governments
- Europe: 100% of governments
- North America: 18 governments
- Oceania: 38% of governments
- South America: 92% of governments

As of 2020, only four governments lacked a Twitter presence: Laos, North Korea, São Tomé and Príncipe, and Turkmenistan.

=== By heads of state and government ===
Former US President Barack Obama is credited as being the first head of state to establish a Twitter account, originally affiliated with his 2008 presidential campaign, on March 5, 2007, as user number 813,286. At the time he was president, he was the most-followed head of state on Twitter. Current US president Donald Trump, whose frequent and often controversial use of Twitter during the 2016 US presidential election campaign became well known globally, has frequently engaged in Twitter diplomacy during his years in office.

Other heads of state and government to pioneer the conduct of Twitter diplomacy include Mexican president Enrique Peña Nieto, Belgian Prime Minister Elio Di Rupo, and Canadian Prime Minister Stephen Harper, all of whom joined Twitter in 2007.

=== By leaders of intergovernmental organizations ===
As of April 2014, the United Nations (UN) is the most followed intergovernmental organization, with its page showing over 2.56 million viewers in April 2014. Many of the UN's subordinate funds and agencies also attract large numbers of followers. The United Nations Children's Fund achieved greater popularity than its parent organization, the UN, and is followed by over 2.69 million as of April 2014.

=== By diplomats and diplomatic missions ===
==== Israel ====
Former Israeli ambassador to the United States, Michael Oren, echoed the sentiment of many diplomats when responding to a May 2012 question about why he joined Twitter: "Today there are few alternatives as far-reaching and effective, with very wide audiences and young audiences, as Twitter. Twitter is another tool that enables me to communicate with other diplomats and journalists while also allowing me to add a personal touch."

==== United Kingdom ====
The UK Foreign and Commonwealth Office published a consolidated list of all UK missions on social media.

==== United States ====
The United States State Department, one of the leaders in digital diplomacy, maintains an active presence on Twitter. Although former United States Secretary of State Hillary Clinton encouraged American diplomats to tweet, she did not establish her personal handle until 2013, after she had already left office. Moreover, her successor John Kerry reactivated his personal Twitter handle after one year on the job. Former US ambassador to the Russian Federation, Michael McFaul, pioneered the use of Twitter for American ambassadors with a steady stream of English and Russian tweets during his 2011–2014 tenure. An academic by trade and not a career diplomat, Ambassador McFaul's tweets were generally blunt and unpolished—uncommon characteristics in the diplomatic world—earning both frequent criticism from the Russian government and praise from his supporters.

==== China ====
Chinese diplomats use Twitter as a tool for public diplomacy. Yet, this is a relatively new trend. In 2013, General Secretary of the Chinese Communist Party Xi Jinping announced that the Internet was one of the "battlefields for the public opinion struggle" and encouraged the Communist Party to "make online public opinion work" for China's advantage, by "spreading China’s voice" and reclaiming its "right to speak to the world". Twitter usage by Chinese government officials worldwide surged beginning from 2019, when 19 accounts for diplomats and 13 for Chinese diplomatic missions were established, actively participating in global discussions concerning a range of international matters while also narrating China's rise. These accounts share statements, press releases, and official documents, ensuring that China's perspective is heard by a global audience. They also respond to news articles, commentaries, or statements from other governments to present China's perspective and offer counterarguments. Scholars point out that Chinese diplomats digitalized the so-called "panda diplomacy" on Twitter and hijack hashtags used by human rights activists, such as #Tibet or #Xinjiang, by posting attractive visuals or human-interest stories. The significance of China's Twitter diplomacy became especially pronounced during the COVID-19 pandemic. Chinese diplomats have adeptly utilized Twitter to provide real-time updates, disseminate official statements, and elucidate China's stance. They also engaged in debates, disputes, and even confrontations with representatives of countries or international media. Chinese diplomats have extended their adept use of social media platforms beyond Twitter, employing a multifaceted approach to engage with global audiences. In similar fashion, they actively leverage platforms such as YouTube, Facebook, and TikTok to reach a diverse range of individuals worldwide.

== See also ==
- Hashtag activism
- Use of Twitter by public figures
- Volfefe index, volatility index related to Twitter usage of former US president Donald Trump
