= History of communication by presidents of the United States =

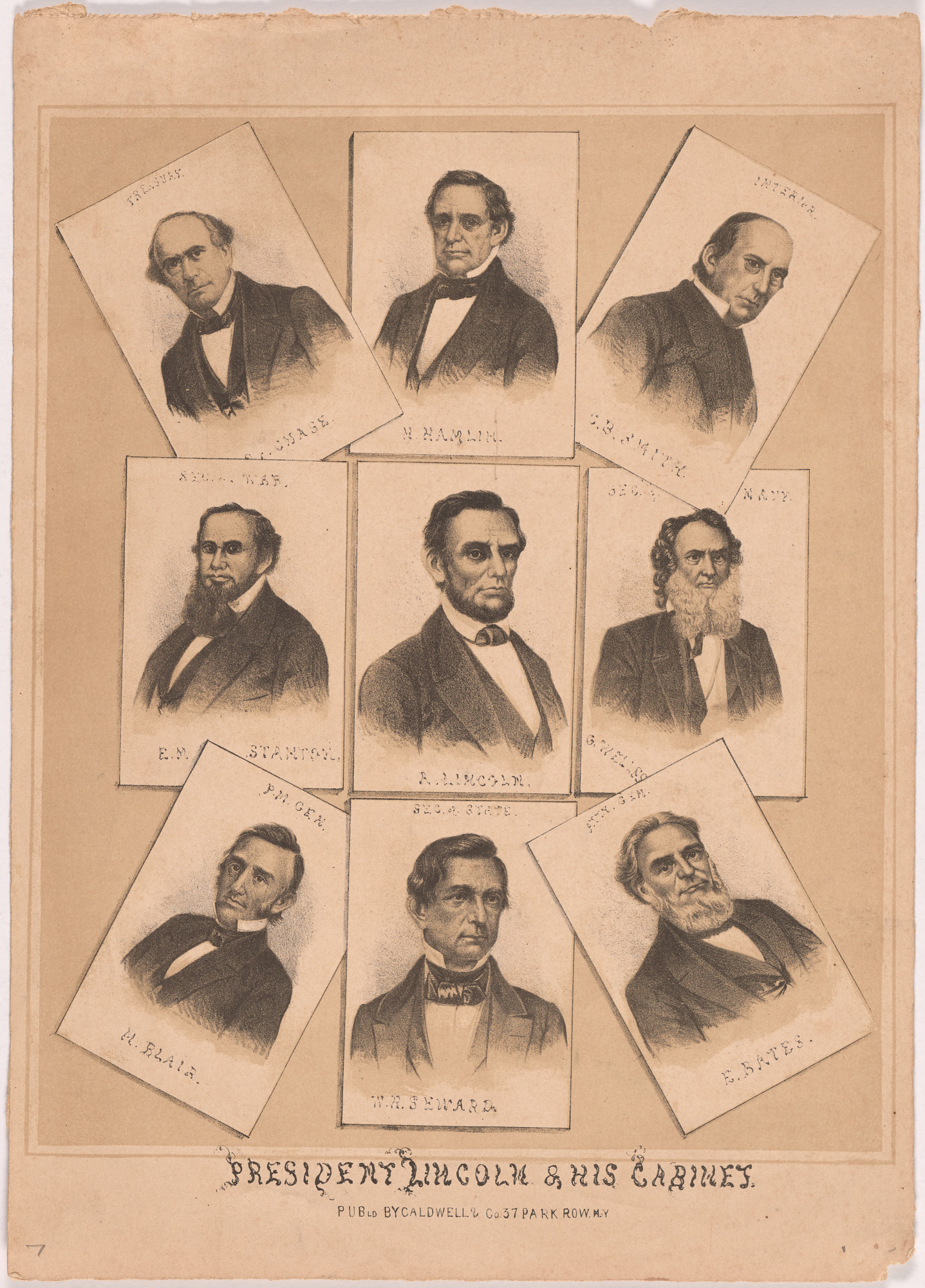
Portrait of President Lincoln and his Cabinet

Many different means of communication have been used over the history of communications by presidents of the United States.

== Direct addresses ==
Historically, if presidents wanted to speak to their constituents, the main way to do so was to travel cross-country and speak to the public themselves. When the first ever president, George Washington, decided to deliver his first State of the Union address, he understood the magnitude that it would have on the public’s opinion of him. Newspapers would be reporting his every word and the crowds would scrutinize his every move. Treading lightly, Washington “praised Congress” and offered “gentle suggestions.” Appearance was especially important at this time. In order to impress the crowd Washington "was dressed in a crow colored suit of clothes, of American manufacture," according to The Virginia Herald and Fredericksburg Advertiser.

Since 1947, presidents have given their State of the Union addresses to the American people as well as Congress on live television. Citizens can react in real time on the White House website. This form of communication from the President to the American people has greatly altered from the way George Washington addressed citizens of the US.

== Radio ==
Warren G. Harding, the United States’ 29th president who held office from 1921 until he died in 1923, was the first president to deliver a radio address. He addressed the nation at the dedication of the Lincoln Memorial on May 30, 1922, an address that served as the day’s equivalent of the State of the Union address. The radio address “heralded a revolutionary shift in how presidents addressed the American public.”

Harding's immediate successor, Calvin Coolidge, was the next president to address the nation via radio. On December 5, 1923, The New York Times wrote that “the voice of President Coolidge, addressing Congress tomorrow, will be carried [by radio] over a greater portion of the United States and will be heard by more people than the voice of any man in history.” He spoke in Washington, D.C., and the address could be heard on radio stations in Washington, New York, Dallas, Providence, St. Louis, and Kansas City. The address was considered a significant achievement, as all six stations were able to successfully broadcast Coolidge’s speech.

Among the most famous and beloved early radio addresses were Franklin D. Roosevelt’s “Fireside Chats,” which he delivered frequently during the Great Depression. His first radio address was delivered on March 12, 1933. At this point, ninety percent of American households owned at least one radio. Thus, the radio addresses were widely accessible, and Roosevelt’s style of delivery was meant to reflect the tastes of the average American. The purpose of Roosevelt’s “Fireside Chats” (a term coined by journalist Robert Trout) was to “to ease fears and to inspire confidence in his leadership.” Unlike Calvin Coolidge, Roosevelt "knew how to use his natural charisma to really engage the American people." According to Kearns Goodwin, Roosevelt would rehearse his fireside chats, picturing that he was addressing individual American teachers, farmers, as well as shopkeeper's.

Roosevelt also delivered Fireside Chats during World War II in an effort to offer justifications of the United States’ decisions regarding the nation’s involvement in the conflict. The addresses were effective in building popularity for Roosevelt’s administration.

== Television ==
Franklin Roosevelt was the first president to appear on television. In April 1939, he spoke at the New York World’s Fair over the NBC New York television station W2XBS (the forerunner of WNBC), though these remarks were only seen on a handful of television sets at the fairgrounds, at NBC headquarters at Radio City and on some of the estimated 200 television sets in private homes in the New York metropolitan area at the time.

The development and popularity of television was stalled due to the outbreak of World War II. In October 1947, nearly a decade after Roosevelt’s television appearance, Harry S. Truman delivered the first televised presidential address from the White House. In his speech, Truman called on Americans to conserve food in order to help starving Europeans who were still recovering from the war. At the time, there were only about 44,000 television sets in U.S. homes. Regardless, this speech marked the beginning of the use of television as a main method of communication between the president and the public. In 1948, Truman became the first presidential candidate to air a paid political ad on television. In 1949, Truman was sworn in for a second term and became the first president to have a nationally televised inauguration.

Dwight D. Eisenhower was the first president to embrace television wholeheartedly by admitting it into his press conferences. This provided the public with frequent general coverage of national politics and an ability to collect the information visually.

In 1960, John F. Kennedy and Richard Nixon faced off in America’s first televised presidential debate. For the first time, candidates’ appearances would affect their success. Knowing voters would watch him in the debate, Kennedy made sure he was well-rested, tan, and made up for his appearance. Nixon, on the other hand, showed up to the debate with a 102-degree fever, giving him a pale and sickly complexion. Most voters who were listening on the radio called the debate a draw. Contrastingly, voters who watched on television pronounced Kennedy the clear winner. This demonstrated the powerful impact television had and would continue to have on the relationship between the president and the public. After Kennedy, presidents and presidential candidates would continue leveraging the medium of television to communicate with the public and win their favor.

== White House website ==
The first official White House website was created in 1994, during Bill Clinton’s administration. White House websites generally display “photographs, speeches, press releases, digital data and other public domains,” and offer public access to details on the sitting administration’s policies and initiatives. The website serves to distribute relevant information and establish a sense of government transparency. Furthermore, the website provides the public with insight into the life of the First Family. There has been a significant amount of changes to the website since it was first created. However one aspect has not altered which is the fact that "our commitment to create meaningful ways for Americans to engage and connect with the White House." Initially, the website allowed for the public to have the opportunity to send a message to the President or the Vice President. People are still able to do this however there are other ways to get in touch with the White House office including on social media as well as through the "We The People petitions platform." As of recently the White House website home page includes current briefing room topics. As well as featured media, pictures labeled with names of the current administrative staff and information and history about the White House itself.

== Email ==
In 1994, Bill Clinton became the first president to send an email over the Internet while in office. It was sent from Clinton’s AOL email account, ClintonPz@aol.com, to Swedish prime minister Carl Bildt. Clinton famously wrote and sent this email in all capital letters, breaching the basic protocol of 'netiquette', the acceptable way of communicating on the internet. The only other email Clinton ever sent was in 1999 to astronaut and Senator John Glenn while he was in space. Though Clinton only sent two emails, his administration sent many more. "We're the first White House to communicate with huge numbers of people from all over by E-mail", Clinton said to his Committee on the Arts and the Humanities in 1994.

Email usage in the Oval Office increased when George W. Bush entered office after Clinton, and it continued to increase under Barack Obama's presidency. Barack Obama was the first president to communicate with the public via email while he was campaigning. His campaign team collected 13.5 million email addresses during the 2008 election. Voters who opted in to be on this email list received information on his platform and how to support his campaign. Once in office, Obama was the first president to use email as his main method of communication with senior staff, advisors, and close friends. He also continued using the email list from his campaign to communicate with his supporters.

== Social media ==
Donald J. Trump
(@realDonaldTrump)
tweeted:

My use of social media is not Presidential - it’s MODERN DAY PRESIDENTIAL. Make America Great Again!

July 1, 2017

Barack Obama is often referred to as the “first social-media president.” He first had a personal Twitter account, @BarackObama. However, after the 2008 election, he said that he had "never used Twitter." Instead, it was his campaign staff that ran his account. Tweets coming directly from Obama were signed "-bo." Later he transitioned over to the official @POTUS account.

When Donald Trump was elected in 2016, the Obama administration announced a “digital transition” that would take place. This transition would give the new president access to the @POTUS social media accounts. Though the previous administration’s posts would not be deleted, they would be archived in accordance with the Presidential Records Act. However, Trump decided to continue using his personal Twitter account, @realDonaldTrump instead.

Less than one hour after his inaugural speech, Trump began tweeting from his personal account. Trump's tweets included "conspiracy theories, fake information and extremist content, including material that energizes some of his base." Trump collected 88 million followers over the course of 16,000 tweets throughout his presidency. After his election loss in 2020 to Joe Biden, Trump repeatedly tweeted claims about COVID-19 and about the "stolen" election. Twitter reviewed Trump's tweets and found them to violate their Glorification of Violence Policy. This prompted Twitter to permanently suspend his account “due to the risk of further incitement of violence.” His account was reinstated on November 19th 2023 by the owner of Twitter, Elon Musk after a poll on his account.

Following Trump's suspension from Twitter, Donald Trump launched Truth Social in February 2022. Truth Social claimed to be a bastion of free speech by having minimal content moderation. The site was established to provide a direct avenue for communication with the president. Trump has use of this platform has been characterized by a hybrid media system approach. Trump utilizes real time posting as a primary tool to focus national news attention. He uses the platform as a way to attack political opponents, broadcast policies, and share his reactions to events as they unfold. This is a shift from how in the past presidents would wait for press releases and formal speeches.

Despite Truth Social being a smaller social network. Truth social has a significant impact on the national news agenda. Journalist monitor the site for the immediate reactions and policy announcements of the president. This results in a vast audience of people who indirectly consume Truth Social posts through the mainstream news coverage.

In 2020, short entertaining video platforms like TikTok became prominent avenues for political communication, mainly among younger audiences. Surveys have shown that nearly half of TikTok users under the age of 30 have reported using the platform to keep up with political issues in the U.S., making it a significant platform for the circulation of political information. Pew Research Center also found that the percentage of Americans who normally get news from TikTok has increased in recent years, again mainly among younger adults. PRC additionally reported that many American viewers said political content on TikTok is more positive than other platforms and that it does not appear to have major negative impact on democracy. Users who use TikTok for political communication mentioned that they feel more comfortable being able to make a difference. Researchers have noted that TikTok’s format of brief, quick, visual engaging clips, show a broader shift in how political messaging is created and consumed by users. This spike highlights how the platform has expanded beyond just entertainment and more into the broader digital news world. Additionally, during the 2024 US Presidential election, both Kamala Harris and President Donald Trump created TikTok accounts, both using the platform to promote their campaign and reach new audiences. TikTok is known as a widely used app for entertainment and now has played its role as a source of political content and news, making TikTok stand out more compared to other social media platforms.

== See also ==
- Social media and political communication in the United States
