= Stockholm Initiative for Digital Diplomacy =

The Stockholm Initiative for Digital Diplomacy (SIDD) took place on 16–17 January 2014, when around 20 diplomats and experts gathered in Stockholm for a 24-hour conference and workshop – a diplohack – on digital diplomacy. The Stockholm Initiative for Digital Diplomacy was the first major international meeting about digital diplomacy, and the main aim was to bring together some of the world leaders in the field, establish a network and exchange experiences. The event was hosted and organised by the Swedish Ministry for Foreign Affairs. Participants from Sweden, the Netherlands, Finland, United Kingdom, United States, Italy, Brazil, Turkey, France, United Arab Emirates, Kosovo, and European External Action Service (EEAS) attended.

== Results ==
The group identified a large number of ideas and challenges that needed to be looked at further. According to an outcome document signed by the participants, perhaps the most important outcome was that the participants decided that SIDD should be established as an ongoing working group to help develop digital diplomacy in a joint forum.

The initiative evolved into informal campaigns under the umbrella #DiplomacyUnited, informally coordinating the work of a dozen embassies in Washington, D.C.
