= Vichy Catalán =

Brand of mineral water

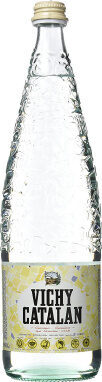
Vichy Catalan-glass bottle

Vichy Catalán is a Catalan brand of carbonated mineral water bottled from a thermal spring in Caldes de Malavella, Girona. It is the leading carbonated mineral water in Spain, with 40% market share. The brand is owned by Grup Vichy Catalan («Premium Mix Group S.L.») a Catalan company dedicated to the bottling and distribution of water. The Vichy Catalán brand was created in 1890 (according to some sources, he registered the brand on 1 May 1890 and inaugurated the plant on 22 December 1889) by the physician and surgeon Modest Furest i Roca after buying the lands of the water spring in Caldes de Malavella, and discovering the mineral-medicinal properties of its thermal waters. In 2022, the global revenue of the beverage subsidiary amounted to 133.5 million euros, with a profit of 1.58 million euros and a workforce of 410 people.

== Composition ==
Composition of Vichy Catalán
Elements	Content (mg/L)
Dry residue	3,052
Calcium (Ca2+)	14
Magnesium (Mg2+)	6
Sodium (Na+)	1,097
Potassium (K+)	50.7
Sulphate (SO_{4}2-)	49.6
Bicarbonate (HCO_{3}-)	2,081
Chloride (Cl-)	584
Lithium (Li-)	1.3

== Bibliography ==
- Piernas, Natalia (2009). Vichy Catalan 125 años de historia. Viena Ediciones. ISBN 978-84-8330-526-3.
- Pomés i Vives, Jordi; Cortadellas, Xavier; Freixas, Lluís (2003). Modest Furest: fundador de El Vichy Catalán; biografia i relats (1 ed.). S.l.: Competium. ISBN 978-84-607-9159-1.

Content in this edit is translated from the existing Catalan Wikipedia article at Grup Vichy Catalan; see its history for attribution.
