= X usage by public figures =

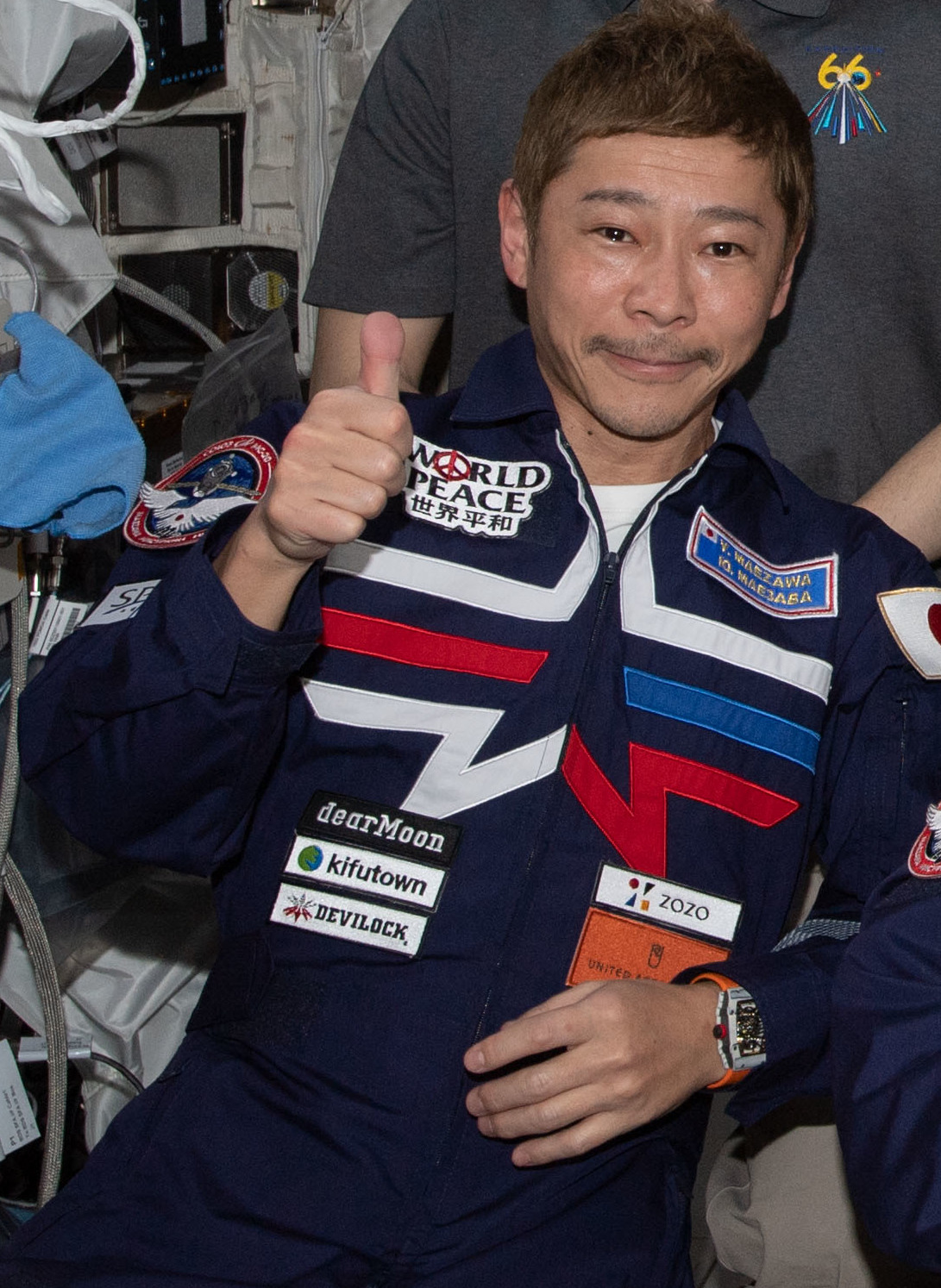
Japanese billionaire Yusaku Maezawa's giveaway in 2019 is the most-retweeted tweet of all-time.

The usage of X, previously called Twitter, by public figures includes the posting and content-sharing by celebrity and politician users on the X platform.

This particular use of the X platform has become an important factor for both X itself and for the celebrity users. As with many other social networking websites, usage by public figures attracts more people to X, thereby increasing opportunities for advertising.

X has provided two facilities to its high-profile users. The first is the verified account. Secondly, X attempts to work with celebrity and media public relations staff to encourage them to make use of Twitter in their advertising and publicity campaigns, encouraging them to use X in their promotional campaigns, and providing support and analysis services to determine what worked, what created "buzz," and what did not.

== Twitter verification ==
Introduced in June 2009, the Twitter verification system provides the site's readers with a means to distinguish genuine account holders from impostors or parodies. A symbol displayed against the account name indicates that Twitter has taken steps to ensure that the account has the approval of the person whom it is claimed to be or represent.

However, the public signup page for obtaining a verified account was discontinued in 2010. Twitter explained that the volume of requests for verified accounts had exceeded its ability to cope; rather, nowadays, Twitter determines on its own whom to approach about verified accounts, limiting verification to "highly sought after users," "business partners," and "individuals at high risk of impersonation." Business partners include those who advertise using Twitter, although it is not clearly spelled out in the material that Twitter provides to its business partners when and whether they might qualify for having verified account status.

== General celebrity usage ==
X can be used by celebrities, athletes, and other famous people for their own self-promotion. However, many celebrities either only partially maintain their accounts or do not actually maintain their own accounts at all. Rather, the accounts are maintained (or co-maintained) by their publicists.

In a growing world of technology, many celebrities feel obligated to have their own accounts, and use it to engage with fans. However, for celebrity users, X has proven to be a double-edged sword: in addition to the laudatory comments from fans, celebrities may receive hostile attacks from anonymous people; thus, fan goodwill and even career opportunities can be lost through tweets.

The most popular United Kingdom celebrities on X come from television, with people like Stephen Fry and Jonathan Ross being amongst the most popular British celebrities on the site. Fry's success on Twitter, in particular, is credited with being the same person on Twitter that he is off Twitter.

== Sportspeople ==
Athlete users can spur competition amongst themselves using the X platform.

Several athletes have encountered trouble because of things that they have said on Twitter. A good example is the 2012 Summer Olympics: many competitors were removed from the Olympics due to racially offensive comments that were posted on their accounts. It has become more of a necessity than ever for celebrities and public figures to be more composed online. Impulsive tweets have proven to be negative for their careers.

== Musicians ==
Musicians have found Twitter to be a very promising place for self-promotion, engaging with fans, and gaining new supporters. It has become a useful tool for promoting new music such as an upcoming single, album, or feature. Fans can react to this by liking or responding to the tweet, and that will subsequently lead to more interaction between the artist and their followers. Twitter has a live-streaming feature that allow direct and real-time interactions.

X allows musicians to promote other fellow artists. They may post photos of them in the studio working with other artists, who can be tagged in the post. This helps other artists gain recognition since any of the followers seeing the photo can visit the other artists' profiles. These practices are integral to growing one's fan base, since they can gain support through fellow musicians.

== Politicians ==
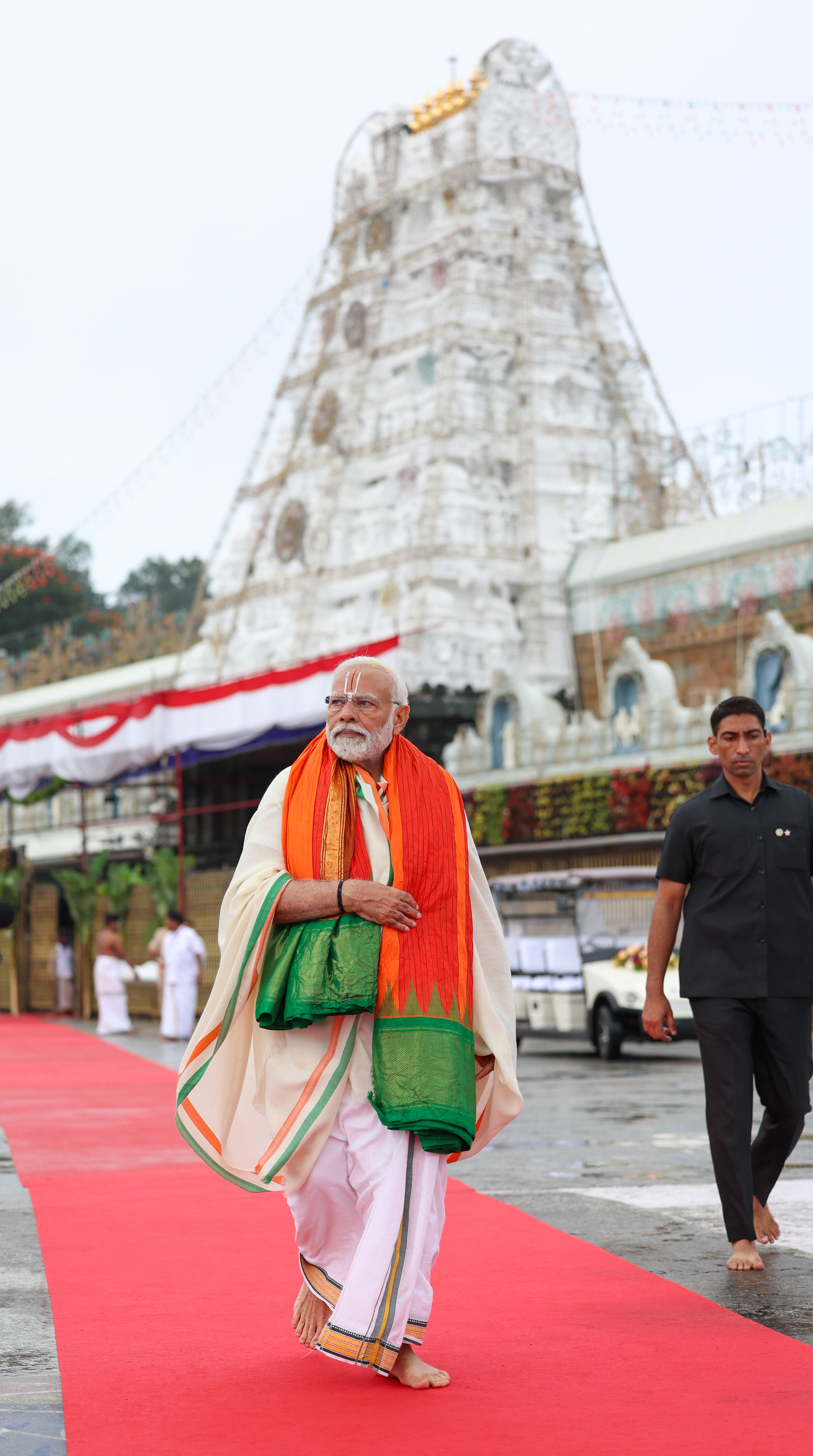
The Prime Minister of India, Narendra Modi, is the most followed world leader currently in office.

Twitter is used by politicians including various heads of state, cabinet members, and other politicians around the world, including in India, the United States, Chile, Germany and Japan. These politicians use the platform to self-promote and to communicate with their constituents. Users may send questions and the congresspeople can directly respond. Blog posts and news articles may be directly linked and shared to all of their followers and anyone else who comes across their profile. Evidence suggests that only around a third of politician's Twitter accounts (in Germany) are actually managed solely by the politician themselves.

As of 22 July 2024, former US president Barack Obama is the most followed world leader, with 131.7 million followers on X. Narendra Modi, the Prime Minister of India, is the most followed world leader currently in office with 100 million followers on his personal X account.

The type of communication by U.S. politicians on X varies from highly personal to press release like. During the primary race for president in 2008, John Edwards was also on Twitter. During the 2008 United States general election, during one monitored period, Obama made 261 tweets while his Republican competitor John McCain made only 26. During the 2016 US presidential election, the top three candidates (Donald Trump, Hillary Clinton, and Bernie Sanders) used Twitter to discuss their campaigns, gain followers and supporters, and talk amongst other candidates. These politicians would also talk negatively about each other and sling insults back and forth. Trump would refer to Clinton as "Crooked Hillary" to further stir up their rivalries. Clinton famously rebutted with "Delete your account." during this presidential race. Clinton used Twitter to promote her presidential campaign but, unlike Obama, she did not follow back many of her new followers. On the state level, American politicians tend to use Twitter primarily for constituent and policy-related issues. The second most popular category of tweets is personal musings. In May 2011, 387 members of the United States Congress had Twitter accounts.

British politicians on Twitter include Jeremy Corbyn and Theresa May. In Australia, the Greens were initially more successful on Twitter than other political parties. The Australian Labor Party's politicians have used Twitter to attack their opposition, with someone creating a parody account featuring Tony Abbott. Kevin Rudd does not appear to be making his own tweets, rather someone else is likely to be doing it for him.

Chilean politicians are using Twitter as an alternative method of communications as they find the mainstream press not giving them media coverage. Politicians in Greece and Japan also use Twitter to communicate with their constituents. Russian President Dmitry Medvedev has used Twitter to help change his image and make himself more personable. Venezuelan President Hugo Chávez was one of the most followed Venezuelan accounts on Twitter.

== Religious figures ==
On December 12, 2012, Pope Benedict XVI sent his first tweet on Twitter, which was retweeted by thousands of users almost immediately. Since this time, the account @Pontifex has amassed over 17.9 million followers (as of March 2019) and regularly engages with users via the hashtag #AskPontifex addressing religious matters and responding to questions. Several satellite accounts are used to transmit and translate the Pope's tweets into different languages.

== See also ==
- Barack Obama on social media
- Twitter use by Donald Trump
- Twitter diplomacy
- Volfefe index, volatility index related to Twitter usage of U.S. President
- List of most-followed X accounts
