= 43rd NAACP Image Awards =

American entertainment awards for 2011

- Date: February 17, 2012
- Site: Shrine Auditorium, Los Angeles, California
- Hosted by: Sanaa Lathan and Anthony Mackie
- Official website: NAACPImageAwards.net

Television coverage
- Network: NBC

The 43rd NAACP Image Awards, presented by the NAACP, will honor outstanding representations and achievements of people of color in motion pictures, television, music, and literature during the 2011 calendar year. The ceremony was hosted by Sanaa Lathan and Anthony Mackie and aired on February 17, 2012, on NBC.

During the ceremony show Yolanda Adams and Kirk Franklin gave a tribute performance to Whitney Houston, who died on February 11, 2012. Cathy Hughes accepted the Chairman's Award at a separate ceremony in New Jersey, while George Lucas was honored with the Vanguard Award. Black Stuntmen's Association received the President's Award.

All nominees are listed below, and the winners are listed in bold.

== Special awards ==
President's Award
- **Black Stuntmen's Association**
Chairman's Award
- **Cathy Hughes**
Vanguard Award
- **George Lucas**

== Motion Picture ==
Outstanding Motion Picture	Outstanding Directing in a Motion Picture
**The Help**; Jumping the Broom; Pariah; The First Grader; Tower Heist	**Salim Akil** **– Jumping the Broom**; Alrick Brown – Kinyarwanda; Angelina Jolie – In the Land of Blood and Honey; Dee Rees – Pariah
Outstanding Actor in a Motion Picture	Outstanding Actress in a Motion Picture
**Laz Alonso** **– Jumping the Broom**; Eddie Murphy – Tower Heist; Laurence Fishburne –Contagion; Oliver Litondo – The First Grader; Vin Diesel – Fast Five	**Viola Davis** **– The Help**; Adepero Oduye – Pariah; Emma Stone – The Help; Paula Patton – Jumping the Broom; Zoe Saldaña – Colombiana
Outstanding Supporting Actor in a Motion Picture	Outstanding Supporting Actress in a Motion Picture
**Mike Epps** **– Jumping the Broom**; Anthony Mackie – The Adjustment Bureau; Charles Parnell – Pariah; Don Cheadle – The Guard; Jeffrey Wright – The Ides of March	**Octavia Spencer** **– The Help**; Bryce Dallas Howard – The Help; Cicely Tyson – The Help; Kim Wayans – Pariah; Maya Rudolph – Bridesmaids
Outstanding Foreign Motion Picture	Outstanding Independent Motion Picture
**In the Land of Blood and Honey**; A Separation; Attack the Block; Le Havre; Life, Above All	**Pariah**; Kinyarwanda; I Will Follow; Mooz-lum; The First Grader
Outstanding Writing in a Motion Picture
**Elizabeth Hunter and** **Arlene Gibbs – Jumping the Broom**; Alrick Brown – Kinyarwanda; Ann Peacock – The First Grader; Dee Rees – Pariah; Tate Taylor – The Help

== Television series and streaming ==
=== Drama ===
Outstanding Drama Series
**Law & Order: Special Victims Unit**; Boardwalk Empire; Grey's Anatomy; The Good Wife; Treme
Outstanding Actor in a Drama Series	Outstanding Actress in a Drama Series
**L.L. Cool J – NCIS: Los Angeles**; Andre Braugher – Men of A Certain Age; Hill Harper – CSI: NY; Taye Diggs – Private Practice; Wendell Pierce – Treme	**Regina King – SouthLAnd**; Chandra Wilson – Grey's Anatomy; Khandi Alexander – Treme; Sandra Oh – Grey's Anatomy; Taraji P. Henson – Person of Interest
Outstanding Supporting Actor in a Drama Series	Outstanding Supporting Actress in a Drama Series
**James Pickens Jr. – Grey's Anatomy**; Corey Reynolds – The Closer; Ice T – Law & Order: Special Victims Unit; Nelsan Ellis – True Blood; Omar Epps – House M.D.	**Archie Panjabi – The Good Wife**; Alfre Woodard – Memphis Beat; Anika Noni Rose – Law & Order: Special Victims Unit; Diahann Carroll – White Collar; Loretta Devine – Grey's Anatomy
Outstanding Directing in a Drama Series	Outstanding Writing in a Drama Series
**Ernest Dickerson – Treme – "Do Watcha Wanna"**; Ken Whittingham – Parenthood – "Opening Night"; Kevin Sullivan – NCIS – "Tell–All"; Paris Barclay – Sons of Anarchy – "Out"; Seith Mann – Dexter – "Get Gellar"	**Lolis Eric Elie – Treme – "Santa Claus, Do You Ever Get the Blues?"**; Cheo Hodari Coker – SouthLAnd – "Punching Water"; Janine Sherman Barrois – Criminal Minds – "The Bittersweet Science"; Pam Veasey – Ringer – "Oh Gawd, There's Two of Them?"; Zoanne Clack – Grey's Anatomy – "I Will Survive"

=== Comedy ===
Outstanding Comedy Series
**Tyler Perry's House of Payne**; Love That Girl!; Modern Family; Reed Between the Lines; The Game
Outstanding Actor in a Comedy Series	Outstanding Actress in a Comedy Series
**Malcolm–Jamal Warner – Reed Between the Lines**; Dulé Hill – Psych; Phil Morris – Love That Girl!; Pooch Hall – The Game; Terry Crews – Are We There Yet?	**Tracee Ellis Ross – Reed Between the Lines**; Tatyana Ali – Love That Girl!; Tia Mowry–Hardrict – The Game; Vanessa Williams – Desperate Housewives; Wendy Raquel Robinson – The Game
Outstanding Supporting Actor in a Comedy Series	Outstanding Supporting Actress in a Comedy Series
**Nick Cannon – Up All Night**; Craig Robinson – The Office; Damon Wayans Jr. – Happy Endings; J.B. Smoove – Curb Your Enthusiasm; Tracy Morgan – 30 Rock	**Keshia Knight Pulliam – Tyler Perry's House of Payne**; Amber Riley – Glee; Gabourey Sidibe – The Big C; Maya Rudolph – Up All Night; Sofia Vergara – Modern Family
Outstanding Directing in a Comedy Series	Outstanding Writing in a Comedy Series
**Leonard R. Garner Jr. – Rules of Engagement – "The Set Up"**; Jay Chandrasekhar – Happy Endings – "The Girl with the David Tattoo"; Kevin Hooks - Drop Dead Diva – "Mother's Day"; Miguel Arteta – How to Make It in America – "Mofongo"; Salim Akil – The Game – "Parachutes/Beach Chairs"	**Salim Akil, Mara Brock Akil – The Game – "Parachutes/Beach Chairs"**; Arthur Harris – Reed Between the Lines – "Let's Talk About Ms. Helen's Son Part 1"; Prentice Penny – Happy Endings – "The Girl with the David Tattoo"; Vali Chandrasekaran – 30 Rock – "It's Never Too Late For Now"; Vince Cheung, Ben Montanio – Wizards of Waverly Place – "Wizards vs. Angels"

=== Television movie, limited-series or dramatic special ===
Outstanding Television Movie, Limited-Series or Dramatic Special
**Thurgood**; Five; Hallmark Hall of Fame: Mitch Albom's Have a Little Faith; Luther; The Least Among You
Outstanding Actor in a Television Movie, Limited-Series or Dramatic Special	Outstanding Actress in a Television Movie, Limited-Series or Dramatic Special
**Laurence Fishburne – Thurgood**; Esai Morales – We Have Your Husband; Idris Elba – Luther; Louis Gossett Jr. – The Least Among You; Samuel L. Jackson – The Sunset Limited	**Taraji P. Henson – Taken From Me: The Tiffany Rubin Story**; Anika Noni Rose – Hallmark Hall of Fame, Mitch Albom's Have a Little Faith; Jenifer Lewis – Five; Rosario Dawson – Five; Tracee Ellis Ross – Five

== Recording ==
Outstanding Album	Outstanding New Artist
**I Remember Me– Jennifer Hudson**; 4 – Beyoncé; F.A.M.E. – Chris Brown; Lasers – Lupe Fiasco; The Light of the Sun – Jill Scott	**Diggy Simmons**; Committed; Landau Eugene Murphy Jr.; Mindless Behavior; Wynter Gordon
Outstanding Male Artist	Outstanding Female Artist
**CeeLo Green**; Anthony Hamilton; Bruno Mars; Chris Brown; Common	**Jill Scott**; Beyoncé; Jennifer Hudson; Ledisi; Mary J. Blige
Outstanding Song	Outstanding Duo, Group or Collaboration
**I Smile** **– Kirk Franklin**; Best Thing I Never Had – Beyoncé; Fool for You – CeeLo Green with Melanie Fiona; So in Love – Jill Scott with Anthony Hamilton; Someone like You – Adele	**Mary J. Blige feat. Drake**; Boyz II Men; Cee Lo Green feat. Melanie Fiona; Sounds of Blackness; The Roots
Outstanding Music Video	Outstanding World Music Album
**Where You At – Jennifer Hudson**; 25/8 – Mary J. Blige; Hear My Call – Jill Scott; I Was Here – Beyoncé; Someone Like You – Adele	**Sounds of Blackness – Sounds of Blackness**; Afrodiaspora – Susana Baca; Carnival Fever – Brother B; Live at 2011 New Orleans Jazz & Heritage Festival – Boukman Eksperyans; The First Grader – Alex Heffes
Outstanding Gospel Album (Traditional or Contemporary)	Outstanding Jazz Album
**Hello Fear – Kirk Franklin**; Becoming – Yolanda Adams; Church on the Moon – Deitrick Haddon; Something Big – Mary Mary; The Journey – Andraé Crouch	**Guitar Man – George Benson**; Chano y Dizzy – Terence Blanchard and Poncho Sanchez; Friends – Stanley Jordan; Legacy – Gerald Wilson; Road Show Vol. – 2 Sonny Rollins
