= NAACP Image Award for Outstanding Actress in a Comedy Series =

American television award

- Awarded for: Outstanding Actress in a Comedy Series
- Country: United States
- Presented by: NAACP
- First award: 1982
- Currently held by: Issa Rae; Insecure (2022)
- Website: naacpimageawards.net

This article lists the winners and nominees for the NAACP Image Award for Outstanding Actress in a Comedy Series. It was known as the Outstanding Lead Actress in a Comedy Series until 2000. Currently, Tracee Ellis Ross holds the record for most wins in this category, having won nine times.

== Winners and nominees ==
Winners are listed first and highlighted in bold.

=== 1980s ===
| Year | Actress | Series | Ref |
|---|---|---|---|
1982
| 1982 | **Marla Gibbs** | **The Jeffersons** | |
1983
| 1983 | **Marla Gibbs** | **The Jeffersons** | |
| 1984 – 87 | —N/a | | |
1988
| 1988 | **Phylicia Rashad** | **The Cosby Show** | |
| 1988 | Jasmine Guy | A Different World | |
| 1988 | Anna Maria Horsford | Amen | |
| 1988 | Daphne Maxwell Reid | Frank's Place | |
| 1988 | Frances Williams | Frank's Place | |
1989
| 1989 | **Phylicia Rashad** | **The Cosby Show** | |
| 1989 | Jasmine Guy | A Different World | |
| 1989 | Anna Maria Horsford | Amen | |
| 1989 | Daphne Maxwell Reid | Frank's Place | |
| 1989 | Frances Williams | Frank's Place | |

=== 1990s ===
| Year | Actress | Series | Ref |
|---|---|---|---|
1990
| 1990 | **Jasmine Guy** | **A Different World** | |
| 1991 | —N/a | | |
1992
| 1992 | **Jasmine Guy** | **A Different World** | |
| 1992 | Janet Hubert-Whitten | Fresh Prince of Bel Air | |
| 1992 | Phylicia Rashad | The Cosby Show | |
| 1992 | Cree Summer | A Different World | |
| 1992 | Raven-Symoné | The Cosby Show | |
1993
| 1993 | **Jasmine Guy** | **A Different World** | |
1994
| 1994 | **Jasmine Guy** | **A Different World** | |
| 1994 | Ella Joyce | Roc | |
| 1994 | Erika Alexander | Living Single | |
| 1994 | Queen Latifah | Living Single | |
| 1994 | Tisha Campbell-Martin | Martin | |
| 1995 | —N/a | | |
1996
| 1996 | **Erika Alexander** | **Living Single** | |
| 1996 | Tisha Campbell-Martin | Martin | |
| 1996 | Kim Coles | Living Single | |
| 1996 | Kim Fields | Living Single | |
| 1996 | Queen Latifah | Living Single | |
1997
| 1997 | **Phylicia Rashad** | **Cosby** | |
| 1997 | Tisha Campbell-Martin | Martin | |
| 1997 | Erika Alexander | Living Single | |
| 1997 | Kim Coles | Living Single | |
| 1997 | Queen Latifah | Living Single | |
1998
| 1998 | **Kim Coles** | **Living Single** | |
| 1998 | Brandy | Moesha | |
| 1998 | Queen Latifah | Living Single | |
| 1998 | Phylicia Rashad | Cosby | |
1999
| 1999 | **Tia Mowry and Tamera Mowry** | **Sister, Sister** | |
| 1999 | Brandy | Moesha | |
| 1999 | Vivica A. Fox | Getting Personal | |
| 1999 | Pam Grier | Linc's | |
| 1999 | Holly Robinson Peete | For Your Love | |

=== 2000s ===
| Year | Actress | Series | Ref |
|---|---|---|---|
2000
| 2000 | **Tia Mowry and Tamera Mowry** | **Sister, Sister** | |
| 2000 | Brandy | Moesha | |
| 2000 | Pam Grier | Linc's | |
| 2000 | Elise Neal | The Hughleys | |
| 2000 | Holly Robinson Peete | For Your Love | |
2001
| 2001 | **Mo'Nique** | **The Parkers** | |
| 2001 | Brandy | Moesha | |
| 2001 | Elise Neal | The Hughleys | |
| 2001 | Wendy Raquel Robinson | The Steve Harvey Show | |
| 2001 | Holly Robinson Peete | For Your Love | |
2002
| 2002 | **Mo'Nique** | **The Parkers** | |
| 2002 | Tisha Campbell-Martin | My Wife and Kids | |
| 2002 | Tracee Ellis Ross | Girlfriends | |
| 2002 | Wendy Raquel Robinson | The Steve Harvey Show | |
| 2002 | Holly Robinson Peete | For Your Love | |
2003
| 2003 | **Tisha Campbell Martin** | **My Wife and Kids** | |
| 2003 | Golden Brooks | Girlfriends | |
| 2003 | Tracee Ellis Ross | Girlfriends | |
| 2003 | Mo'Nique | The Parkers | |
| 2003 | Kellita Smith | The Bernie Mac Show | |
2004
| 2004 | **Mo'Nique** | **The Parkers** | |
| 2004 | Tisha Campbell-Martin | My Wife and Kids | |
| 2004 | Tracee Ellis Ross | Girlfriends | |
| 2004 | Whoopi Goldberg | Whoopi | |
| 2004 | Kellita Smith | The Bernie Mac Show | |
2005
| 2005 | **Mo'Nique** | **The Parkers** | |
| 2005 | Tisha Campbell-Martin | My Wife and Kids | |
| 2005 | Tracee Ellis Ross | Girlfriends | |
| 2005 | Eve | Eve | |
| 2005 | Kellita Smith | The Bernie Mac Show | |
2006
| 2006 | **Tichina Arnold** | **Everybody Hates Chris** | |
| 2006 | Tracee Ellis Ross | Girlfriends | |
| 2006 | Jill Marie Jones | Girlfriends | |
| 2006 | Holly Robinson Peete | Love, Inc. | |
| 2006 | Rachel True | Half & Half | |
2007
| 2007 | **Tracee Ellis Ross** | **Girlfriends** | |
| 2007 | Tichina Arnold | Everybody Hates Chris | |
| 2007 | America Ferrera | Ugly Betty | |
| 2007 | Maya Rudolph | Saturday Night Live | |
| 2007 | Raven-Symoné | That's So Raven | |
2008
| 2008 | **America Ferrera** | **Ugly Betty** | |
| 2008 | Tichina Arnold | Everybody Hates Chris | |
| 2008 | Golden Brooks | Girlfriends | |
| 2008 | Tracee Ellis Ross | Girlfriends | |
| 2008 | Tia Mowry | The Game | |
2009
| 2009 | **Tracee Ellis Ross** | **Girlfriends** | |
| 2009 | Tichina Arnold | Everybody Hates Chris | |
| 2009 | Cassi Davis | Tyler Perry's House of Payne | |
| 2009 | America Ferrera | Ugly Betty | |
| 2009 | Tia Mowry | The Game | |

=== 2010s ===
| Year | Actress | Series | Ref |
|---|---|---|---|
2010
| 2010 | **Cassi Davis** | **Tyler Perry's House of Payne** | |
| 2010 | Tichina Arnold | Everybody Hates Chris | |
| 2010 | America Ferrera | Ugly Betty | |
| 2010 | C. C. H. Pounder | Brothers | |
| 2010 | Sherri Shepherd | Sherri | |
2011
| 2011 | **Vanessa Williams** | **Desperate Housewives** | |
| 2011 | Tatyana Ali | Love That Girl! | |
| 2011 | Essence Atkins | Are We There Yet? | |
| 2011 | Cassi Davis | Tyler Perry's House of Payne | |
| 2011 | Salli Richardson-Whitfield | Eureka | |
2012
| 2012 | **Tracee Ellis Ross** | **Reed Between the Lines** | |
| 2012 | Tatyana Ali | Love That Girl! | |
| 2012 | Tia Mowry | The Game | |
| 2012 | Wendy Raquel Robinson | The Game | |
| 2012 | Vanessa Williams | Desperate Housewives | |
2013
| 2013 | **Cassi Davis** | **Tyler Perry's House of Payne** | |
| 2013 | Tatyana Ali | Love That Girl! | |
| 2013 | Amber Riley | Glee | |
| 2013 | Wendy Raquel Robinson | The Game | |
| 2013 | Kellita Smith | The First Family | |
2014
| 2014 | **Wendy Raquel Robinson** | **The Game** | |
| 2014 | Mindy Kaling | The Mindy Project | |
| 2014 | Niecy Nash | The Soul Man | |
| 2014 | Tasha Smith | Tyler Perry's For Better or Worse | |
| 2014 | Aisha Tyler | Archer | |
2015
| 2015 | **Tracee Ellis Ross** | **Black-ish** | |
| 2015 | Uzo Aduba | Orange Is the New Black | |
| 2015 | Mindy Kaling | The Mindy Project | |
| 2015 | Niecy Nash | The Soul Man | |
| 2015 | Wendy Raquel Robinson | The Game | |
2016
| 2016 | **Tracee Ellis Ross** | **Black-ish** | |
| 2016 | Uzo Aduba | Orange Is the New Black | |
| 2016 | Loretta Devine | The Carmichael Show | |
| 2016 | Wendy Raquel Robinson | The Game | |
| 2016 | Gina Rodriguez | Jane the Virgin | |
2017
| 2017 | **Tracee Ellis Ross** | **Black-ish** | |
| 2017 | Uzo Aduba | Orange Is the New Black | |
| 2017 | Niecy Nash | The Soul Man | |
| 2017 | Issa Rae | Insecure | |
| 2017 | Keesha Sharp | Lethal Weapon | |
2018
| 2018 | **Tracee Ellis Ross** | **Black-ish** | |
| 2018 | Danielle Brooks | Orange Is the New Black | |
| 2018 | Issa Rae | Insecure | |
| 2018 | Loretta Devine | The Carmichael Show | |
| 2018 | Niecy Nash | Claws | |
2019
| 2019 | **Tracee Ellis Ross** | **Black-ish** | |
| 2019 | Danielle Brooks | Orange Is the New Black | |
| 2019 | Logan Browning | Dear White People | |
| 2019 | Issa Rae | Insecure | |
| 2019 | Yara Shahidi | Grown-ish | |

=== 2020s ===
| Year | Actress | Series | Ref |
|---|---|---|---|
2020
| 2020 | **Tracee Ellis Ross** | **Black-ish** | |
| 2020 | Logan Browning | Dear White People | |
| 2020 | Tiffany Haddish | The Last O.G. | |
| 2020 | Jill Scott | First Wives Club | |
| 2020 | Yara Shahidi | Grown-ish | |
2021
| 2021 | **Issa Rae** | **Insecure** | |
| 2021 | Tracee Ellis Ross | Black-ish | |
| 2021 | Regina Hall | Black Monday | |
| 2021 | Folake Olowofoyeku | Bob Hearts Abishola | |
| 2021 | Yara Shahidi | Grown-ish | |
2022
| 2022 | **Issa Rae** | **Insecure** | |
| 2022 | Loretta Devine | Family Reunion | |
| 2022 | Regina Hall | Black Monday | |
| 2022 | Tracee Ellis Ross | Black-ish | |
| 2022 | Yvonne Orji | Insecure | |

== Multiple wins and nominations ==
=== Wins ===
9 wins

- Tracee Ellis Ross

4 wins

- Mo'Nique
- Jasmine Guy

3 wins

- Phylicia Rashad

2 wins

- Cassi Davis
- Tamera Mowry
- Tia Mowry
- Issa Rae

=== Nominations ===
17 nominations

- Tracee Ellis Ross

7 nominations

- Wendy Raquel Robinson

6 nominations

- Tisha Campbell-Martin
- Jasmine Guy

5 nominations

- Tichina Arnold
- Mo'Nique
- Tia Mowry
- Issa Rae
- Phylicia Rashad
- Holly Robinson Peete

4 nominations

- Brandy
- Cassi Davis
- America Ferrera
- Niecy Nash
- Kellita Smith

3 nominations

- Uzo Aduba
- Erika Alexander
- Tatyana Ali
- Kim Coles
- Loretta Devine
- Queen Latifah
- Yara Shahidi

2 nominations

- Golden Brooks
- Logan Browning
- Pam Grier
- Regina Hall
- Mindy Kaling
- Tamera Mowry
- Elise Neal
- Raven-Symoné
- Vanessa Williams
