= NAACP Image Award for Outstanding Actor in a Drama Series =

American television award

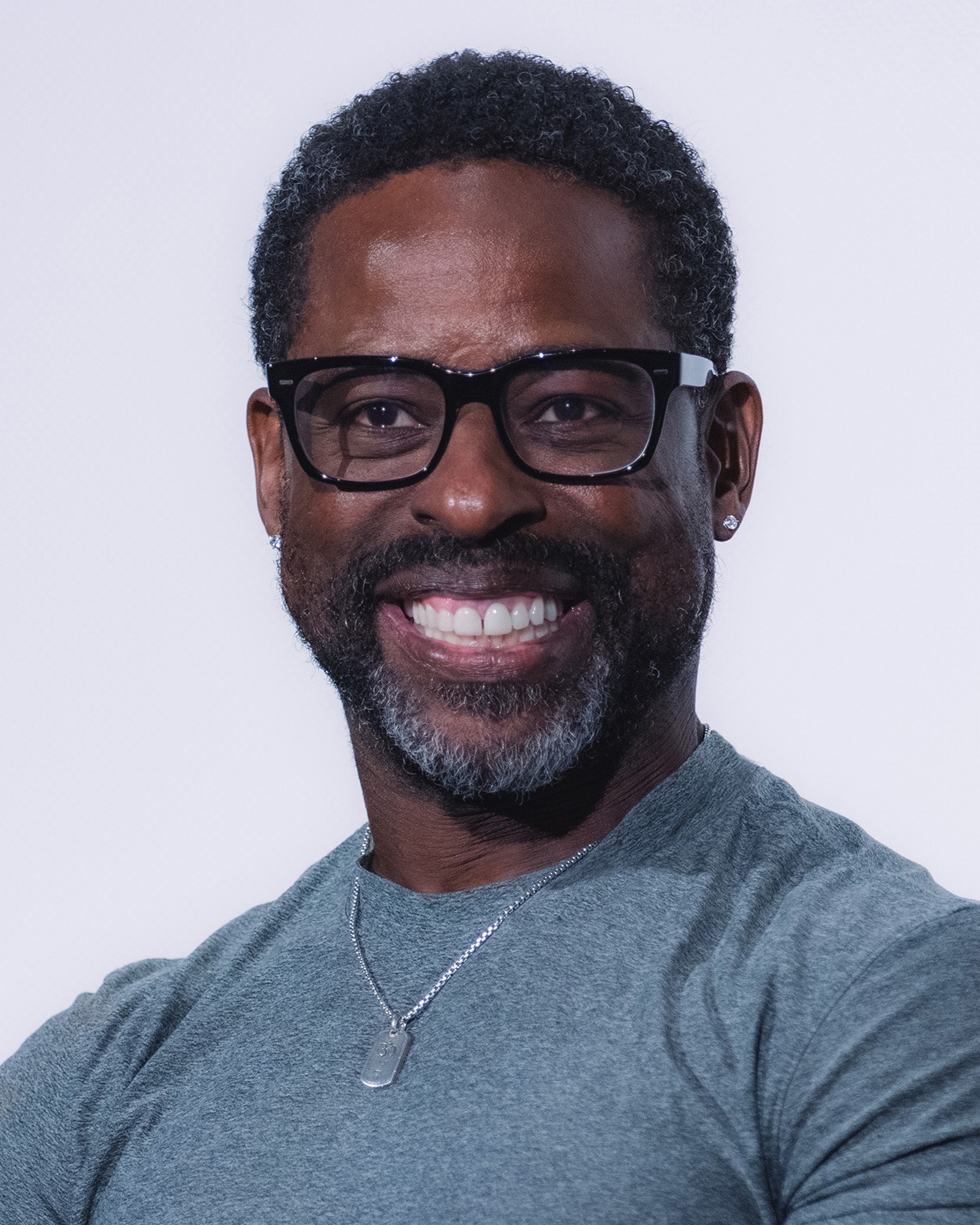
- The 2026 recipient: Sterling K. Brown
- Awarded for: Outstanding Actor in a Drama Series
- Country: United States
- Presented by: NAACP
- First award: 1972
- Currently held by: Sterling K. Brown for Paradise (2026)

Highlights
- Most awards: LL Cool J (4)
- Most nominations: Hill Harper (9)
- Website: naacpimageawards.net

This article lists the winners and nominees for the NAACP Image Award for Outstanding Actor in a Drama Series. The award was first given in 1972. Not to be confused with the Award for Outstanding Actor in a Television Movie, Mini-Series or Dramatic Special. Currently, LL Cool J holds the record for most wins in the category with four.

== Winners and nominees ==
Winners are listed first and highlighted in bold.

=== 1970s ===
Year	Actor	Series	Ref
1972
1972	**Redd Foxx**	**Sanford and Son**	
1973 – 79	—N/a		

=== 1980s ===
Year	Actor	Series	Ref
1980 – 81	—N/a		
1982
1982	**Paul Winfield**	**The Sophisticated Gents**	
1983
1983	**Howard Rollins**	**For Us the Living: The Medgar Evers Story**	
1984 – 88	—N/a		
1989
1989	**Howard Rollins**	**In the Heat of the Night**	

=== 1990s ===
Year	Actor	Series	Ref
1990
1990	**Danny Glover**	**Mandela**	
1991	—N/a		
1992
1992	**Blair Underwood**	**Murder in Mississippi**	
1993
1993	**James Earl Jones**	**Gabriel's Fire**	
1993	Lawrence Hilton-Jacobs	The Jacksons: An American Dream	
1994
1994	**Dorian Harewood**	**I'll Fly Away**	
1995
1995	**Blair Underwood**	**L.A. Law**	
1996
1996	**Malik Yoba**	**New York Undercover**	
1996	André Braugher	Homicide: Life on the Street	
1996	Avery Brooks	Star Trek: Deep Space Nine	
1996	Yaphet Kotto	Homicide: Life on the Street	
1996	Eriq La Salle	ER	
1997
1997	**Malik Yoba**	**New York Undercover**	
1997	André Braugher	Homicide: Life on the Street	
1997	Avery Brooks	Star Trek: Deep Space Nine	
1997	Yaphet Kotto	Homicide: Life on the Street	
1997	Eriq La Salle	ER	
1998
1998	**Malik Yoba**	**New York Undercover**	
1998	André Braugher	Homicide: Life on the Street	
1998	Yaphet Kotto	Homicide: Life on the Street	
1998	Eriq La Salle	ER	
1998	Richard Roundtree	413 Hope St.	
1999
1999	**Eriq La Salle**	**ER**	
1999	André Braugher	Homicide: Life on the Street	
1999	Rocky Carroll	Chicago Hope	
1999	Steve Harris	The Practice	
1999	Yaphet Kotto	Homicide: Life on the Street	

=== 2000s ===
Year	Actor	Series	Ref
2000
2000	**Eriq La Salle**	**ER**	
2000	Adewale Akinnuoye-Agbaje	Oz	
2000	Michael Beach	Third Watch	
2000	Steve Harris	The Practice	
2000	Jesse L. Martin	Law & Order	
2001
2001	**Blair Underwood**	**City of Angels**	
2001	André Braugher	Gideon's Crossing	
2001	Steve Harris	The Practice	
2001	Eriq La Salle	ER	
2001	Jesse L. Martin	Law & Order	
2002
2002	**Eriq La Salle**	**ER**	
2002	André Braugher	Gideon's Crossing	
2002	Steve Harris	The Practice	
2002	Ving Rhames	UC: Undercover	
2002	Courtney B. Vance	Law & Order: Criminal Intent	
2003
2003	**Michael Beach**	**Third Watch**	
2003	Bill Bellamy	Fastlane	
2003	André Braugher	Hack	
2003	Dennis Haysbert	24	
2003	Mykelti Williamson	Boomtown	
2004
2004	**Steve Harris**	**The Practice**	
2004	Gary Dourdan	CSI: Crime Scene Investigation	
2004	Dennis Haysbert	24	
2004	Jesse L. Martin	Law & Order	
2004	Wendell Pierce	The Wire	
2005
2005	**Taye Diggs**	**Kevin Hill**	
2005	Gary Dourdan	CSI: Crime Scene Investigation	
2005	Hill Harper	CSI: NY	
2005	Steve Harris	The Practice	
2005	Jesse L. Martin	Law & Order	
2006
2006	**Isaiah Washington**	**Grey's Anatomy**	
2006	Omar Epps	House	
2006	Hill Harper	CSI: NY	
2006	Ice-T	Law & Order: Special Victims Unit	
2006	Jesse L. Martin	Law & Order	
2007
2007	**Isaiah Washington**	**Grey's Anatomy**	
2007	Hill Harper	CSI: NY	
2007	Dennis Haysbert	The Unit	
2007	Jesse L. Martin	Law & Order	
2007	Michael K. Williams	The Wire	
2008
2008	**Hill Harper**	**CSI: NY**	
2008	Anthony Anderson	K-Ville	
2008	Dennis Haysbert	The Unit	
2008	Jesse L. Martin	Law & Order	
2008	Jimmy Smits	Cane	
2009
2009	**Hill Harper**	**CSI: NY**	
2009	Anthony Anderson	Law & Order	
2009	Omar Epps	House	
2009	Dennis Haysbert	The Unit	
2009	Blair Underwood	In Treatment	

=== 2010s ===
Year	Actor	Series	Ref
2010
2010	**Hill Harper**	**CSI: NY**	
2010	Anthony Anderson	Law & Order	
2010	Taye Diggs	Private Practice	
2010	Laurence Fishburne	CSI: Crime Scene Investigation	
2010	LL Cool J	NCIS: Los Angeles	
2011
2011	**LL Cool J**	**NCIS: Los Angeles**	
2011	Anthony Anderson	Law & Order	
2011	Laurence Fishburne	CSI: Crime Scene Investigation	
2011	Hill Harper	CSI: NY	
2011	Blair Underwood	The Event	
2012
2012	**LL Cool J**	**NCIS: Los Angeles**	
2012	André Braugher	Men of a Certain Age	
2012	Taye Diggs	Private Practice	
2012	Hill Harper	CSI: NY	
2012	Wendell Pierce	Treme	
2013
2013	**LL Cool J**	**NCIS: Los Angeles**	
2013	Michael Clarke Duncan	The Finder	
2013	Hill Harper	CSI: NY	
2013	Dulé Hill	Psych	
2013	Wendell Pierce	Treme	
2014
2014	**LL Cool J**	**NCIS: Los Angeles**	
2014	Michael Ealy	Almost Human	
2014	Shemar Moore	Criminal Minds	
2014	James Pickens Jr.	Grey's Anatomy	
2014	Wendell Pierce	Treme	
2015
2015	**Shemar Moore**	**Criminal Minds**	
2015	Taye Diggs	Murder in the First	
2015	Omar Epps	Resurrection	
2015	Omari Hardwick	Being Mary Jane	
2015	LL Cool J	NCIS: Los Angeles	
2016
2016	**Terrence Howard**	**Empire**	
2016	Morris Chestnut	Rosewood	
2016	Omari Hardwick	Power	
2016	LL Cool J	NCIS: Los Angeles	
2016	Wesley Snipes	The Player	
2017
2017	**Sterling K. Brown**	**This Is Us**	
2017	Mike Colter	Marvel's Luke Cage	
2017	Omari Hardwick	Power	
2017	Terrence Howard	Empire	
2017	Kofi Siriboe	Queen Sugar	
2018
2018	**Omari Hardwick**	**Power**	
2018	Kofi Siriboe	Queen Sugar	
2018	Mike Colter	The Defenders	
2018	Sterling K. Brown	This Is Us	
2018	Terrence Howard	Empire	
2019
2019	**Omari Hardwick**	**Power**	
2019	Jason Mitchell	The Chi	
2019	Keith David	Greenleaf	
2019	Kofi Siriboe	Queen Sugar	
2019	Sterling K. Brown	This Is Us	

=== 2020s ===
Year	Actor	Series	Ref
2020
2020	**Omari Hardwick**	**Power**	
2020	Sterling K. Brown	This Is Us	
2020	Billy Porter	Pose	
2020	Kofi Siriboe	Queen Sugar	
2020	Forest Whitaker	Godfather of Harlem	
2021
2021	**Regé-Jean Page**	**Bridgerton**	
2021	Sterling K. Brown	This Is Us	
2021	Jonathan Majors	Lovecraft Country	
2021	Keith David	Greenleaf	
2021	Nicco Annan	P-Valley	
2022
2022	**Sterling K. Brown**	**This Is Us**	
2022	Damson Idris	Snowfall	
2022	Billy Porter	Pose	
2022	Kofi Siriboe	Queen Sugar	
2022	Forest Whitaker	Godfather of Harlem	
2023
2023	**Nicco Annan**	**P-Valley**	
2023	Jabari Banks	Bel-Air	
2023	Kofi Siriboe	Queen Sugar	
2023	Sterling K. Brown	This Is Us	
2023	Damson Idris	Snowfall	
2024
2024	**Damson Idris**	**Snowfall**	
2024	Forest Whitaker	Godfather of Harlem	
2024	Idris Elba	Hijack	
2024	Jabari Banks	Bel-Air	
2024	Jesse L. Martin	The Irrational	
2025
2025	**Michael Rainey Jr.**	**Power Book II: Ghost**	
2025	Aldis Hodge	Cross	
2025	Donald Glover	Mr. & Mrs. Smith	
2025	Harold Perrineau	From	
2025	Jabari Banks	Bel-Air	
2026
2026	**Sterling K. Brown**	**Paradise**	
2026	Forest Whitaker	Godfather of Harlem	
2026	Jabari Banks	Bel-Air	
2026	Michael Cooper Jr.	Forever	
2026	Morris Chestnut	Watson	

== Multiple wins and nominations ==
=== Wins ===
4 wins

- LL Cool J

3 wins

- Sterling K. Brown
- Omari Hardwick
- Hill Harper
- Eriq La Salle
- Blair Underwood
- Malik Yoba

2 wins

- Isaiah Washington
- Howard Rollins

=== Nominations ===
9 nominations

- Hill Harper

8 nominations

- André Braugher
- Sterling K. Brown
- Jesse L. Martin

7 nominations

- Eriq La Salle
- LL Cool J

6 nominations

- Steve Harris
- Omari Hardwick
- Kofi Siriboe

5 nominations

- Dennis Haysbert
- Blair Underwood

4 nominations

- Anthony Anderson
- Jabari Banks
- Taye Diggs
- Yaphet Kotto
- Wendell Pierce
- Forest Whitaker

3 nominations

- Omar Epps
- Terrence Howard
- Damson Idris
- Malik Yoba

2 nominations

- Nicco Annan
- Michael Beach
- Avery Brooks
- Morris Chestnut
- Mike Colter
- Keith David
- Gary Dourdan
- Laurence Fishburne
- Shemar Moore
- Billy Porter
- Isaiah Washington
