= NAACP Image Award for Outstanding Television Movie, Mini-Series or Dramatic Special =

Annual artistic award

This article lists the winners and nominees for the NAACP Image Award for Outstanding Television Movie, Mini-Series or Dramatic Special. Originally entitled Outstanding Drama Series, Mini-Series or Television Movie, the award was retitled to its current name in 1995.

== Winners and nominees ==
Winners are listed first and highlighted in bold.

=== 1980s ===
Year	Movie / Series	Ref
1982
1982	**Sister, Sister**	
1983 – 89	—N/a	

=== 1990s ===
Year	Movie / Series	Ref
1990	—N/a	
1991
1991	**The Women of Brewster Place**	
1992
1992	**In the Heat of the Night**	
1992	Equal Justice	
1992	Gabriel's Fire	
1992	Separate but Equal	
1993
1993	**In the Heat of the Night**	
1994
1994	**I'll Fly Away**	
1995
1995	**Queen: The Story of an American Family**	
1996
1996	**The Tuskegee Airmen**	
1996	Children of the Dust	
1996	Divas	
1996	The Piano Lesson	
1996	Tyson	
1997
1997	**America's Dream**	
1997	Deadly Voyage	
1997	Rebound: The Legend of Earl "The Goat" Manigault	
1997	Run for the Dream: The Gail Devers Story	
1997	Soul of the Game	
1998
1998	**Miss Evers' Boys**	
1998	Buffalo Soldiers	
1998	Cinderella	
1998	Don King: Only in America	
1998	First Time Felon	
1999
1999	**The Temptations**	
1999	Always Outnumbered	
1999	Mama Flora's Family	
1999	Ruby Bridges	
1999	The Wedding	

=== 2000s ===
Year	Movie / Series	Ref
2000
2000	**Introducing Dorothy Dandridge**	
2000	A Lesson Before Dying	
2000	Having Our Say: The Delany Sisters' First 100 Years	
2000	Jackie's Back	
2000	Selma, Lord, Selma	
2001
2001	**Sally Hemings: An American Scandal**	
2001	A House Divided	
2001	The Corner	
2001	Disappearing Acts	
2001	Freedom Song	
2002
2002	**Boycott**	
2002	A Huey P. Newton Story	
2002	Bojangles	
2002	Dancing in September	
2002	Fire and Ice	
2003
2003	**The Rosa Parks Story**	
2003	10,000 Black Men Named George	
2003	Keep the Faith, Baby	
2003	The Middle Passage	
2003	Whitewash: The Clarence Brandley Story	
2004
2004	**D.C. Sniper: 23 Days of Fear**	
2004	Deacons for Defense	
2004	Good Fences	
2004	Jasper, Texas	
2004	Sounder	
2005
2005	**Something The Lord Made**	
2005	Crown Heights	
2005	Justice	
2005	Redemption: The Stan Tookie Williams Story	
2005	Walking on Sunshine	
2006
2006	**Lackawanna Blues**	
2006	Mississippi Justice	
2006	The Reading Room	
2006	Sometimes in April	
2006	Their Eyes Were Watching God	
2007
2007	**When the Levees Broke: A Requiem in Four Acts**	
2007	Life Is Not a Fairy Tale	
2007	Sleeper Cell	
2007	Tsunami: The Aftermath	
2007	The Untold Story of Emmett Louis Til	
2008
2008	**Life Support**	
2008	The Bronx Is Burning	
2008	Bury My Heart at Wounded Knee	
2008	Five Days	
2008	The List	
2009
2009	**A Raisin in the Sun**	
2009	24: Redemption	
2009	Accidental Friendship	
2009	House of Saddam	
2009	Racing for Time	

=== 2010s ===
Year	Movie / Series	Ref
2010
2010	**Gifted Hands: The Ben Carson Story**	
2010	America	
2010	Brick City	
2010	Georgia O'Keeffe	
2010	Relative Stranger	
2011
2011	**Sins of the Mother**	
2011	America: The Story of Us (Part 4)	
2011	Filling the Gap	
2011	Luther	
2011	The Wronged Man	
2012
2012	**Thurgood**	
2012	Five	
2012	Have a Little Faith	
2012	The Least Among You	
2012	Luther	
2013
2013	**Steel Magnolias**	
2013	Abducted: The Carlina White Story	
2013	Firelight	
2013	Raising Izzie	
2013	Sugar Mommas	
2014
2014	**Being Mary Jane**	
2014	Betty & Coretta	
2014	CrazySexyCool: The TLC Story	
2014	Luther	
2014	Muhammad Ali's Greatest Fight	
2015
2015	**The Trip to Bountiful**	
2015	A Day Late and a Dollar Short	
2015	American Horror Story: Freak Show	
2015	Drumline: A New Beat	
2015	The Gabby Douglas Story	
2016
2016	**The Wiz Live!**	
2016	American Crime	
2016	Bessie	
2016	The Book of Negroes	
2016	Luther	
2017
2017	**The People v. O. J. Simpson: American Crime Story**	
2017	American Crime	
2017	Confirmation	
2017	The Night Of	
2017	Roots	
2018
2018	**The New Edition Story**	
2018	Flint	
2018	The Immortal Life of Henrietta Lacks	
2018	Shots Fired	
2018	When Love Kills: The Falicia Blakely Story	
2019
2019	**The Bobby Brown Story**	
2019	Behind the Movement	
2019	The Simone Biles Story: Courage to Soar	
2019	Seven Seconds	
2019	Jesus Christ Superstar Live in Concert	

=== 2020s ===
Year	Movie / Series	Ref
2020
2020	**When They See Us**	
2020	American Son	
2020	Being Mary Jane	
2020	Native Son	
2020	True Detective	
2021
2021	**Self Made**	
2021	Hamilton	
2021	Little Fires Everywhere	
2021	Sylvie's Love	
2021	The Clark Sisters: First Ladies of Gospel	
2022
2022	**Colin in Black & White**	
2022	Genius: Aretha	
2022	Love Life	
2022	Robin Roberts Presents: Mahalia	
2022	The Underground Railroad	
2023
2023	**The Best Man: The Final Chapters**	
2023	Carl Weber's The Black Hamptons	
2023	From Scratch	
2023	The Last Days of Ptolemy Grey	
2023	Women of the Movement	
2024
2024	**Swarm**	
2024	Black Girl Missing	
2024	First Lady of BMF: The Tonesa Welch Story	
2024	Heist 88	
2024	Lawmen: Bass Reeves	
2025
2025	**Fight Night: The Million Dollar Heist**	
2025	Genius: MLK/X	
2025	Griselda	
2025	Rebel Ridge	
2025	The Madness	
2026
2026	**Straw**	
2026	G20	
2026	Ironheart	
2026	Ruth & Boaz	
2026	Washington Black	

== Multiple wins and nominations ==
=== Wins ===
2 wins

- In the Heat of the Night

=== Nominations ===
4 nominations

- Luther

2 nominations

- American Crime
- Genius
- In the Heat of the Night
