= NAACP Image Award for Outstanding Actor in a Comedy Series =

Award from the NAACP

- Awarded for: Outstanding Actor in a Comedy Series
- Country: United States
- Presented by: NAACP
- First award: 1972
- Currently held by: Anthony Anderson; Black-ish (2022)
- Website: naacpimageawards.net

This article lists the winners and nominees for the NAACP Image Award for Outstanding Actor in a Comedy Series. It was known as the Outstanding Lead Actor in a Comedy Series until 2000. Currently Anthony Anderson holds the record for most wins in this category with eight.

== Winners and nominees ==
Winners are listed first and highlighted in bold.

=== 1970s ===
Year	Actor	Series	Ref
1972
1972	**Redd Foxx**	**Sanford and Son**	
1973 – 79	—N/a		

=== 1980s ===
Year	Actor	Series	Ref
1980 – 81	—N/a		
1982
1982	**Sherman Hemsley**	**The Jeffersons**	
1983
1983	**Sherman Hemsley**	**The Jeffersons**	
1984 – 87	—N/a		
1988
1988	**Roscoe Lee Browne**	**The Cosby Show**	
1989
1989	**Tim Reid**	**Frank's Place**	
1989	Clifton Davis	Amen	
1989	Kadeem Hardison	A Different World	
1989	Lincoln Kilpatrick	Frank's Place	
1989	William Thomas Jr.	Frank's Place	

=== 1990s ===
Year	Actor	Series	Ref
1990
1990	**Bill Cosby**	**The Cosby Show**	
1991	—N/a		
1992
1992	**Kadeem Hardison**	**A Different World**	
1992	Bill Cosby	The Cosby Show	
1992	Will Smith	The Fresh Prince of Bel Air	
1992	Damon Wayans	In Living Color	
1992	Jaleel White	Family Matters	
1993
1993	**Bill Cosby**	**The Cosby Show**	
1994
1994	**Martin Lawrence**	**Martin**	
1994	Ossie Davis	Evening Shade	
1994	Will Smith	The Fresh Prince of Bel Air	
1994	Charles S. Dutton	Roc	
1994	Kadeem Hardison	A Different World	
1995	—N/a		
1996
1996	**Martin Lawrence**	**Martin**	
1996	John Henton	Living Single	
1996	LL Cool J	In the House	
1996	Will Smith	The Fresh Prince of Bel Air	
1996	Jaleel White	Family Matters	
1997
1997	**Jaleel White**	**Family Matters**	
1997	Terrence C. Carson	Living Single	
1997	Martin Lawrence	Martin	
1997	LL Cool J	In the House	
1997	Will Smith	The Fresh Prince of Bel Air	
1998
1998	**Jamie Foxx**	**The Jamie Foxx Show**	
1998	Terrence C. Carson	Living Single	
1998	Steve Harvey	The Steve Harvey Show	
1998	Gregory Hines	The Gregory Hines Show	
1998	LL Cool J	In the House	
1999
1999	**Steve Harvey**	**The Steve Harvey Show**	
1999	Jamie Foxx	The Jamie Foxx Show	
1999	Robert Guillaume	Sports Night	
1999	Isaac Hayes	South Park	
1999	D. L. Hughley	The Hughleys	

=== 2000s ===
Year	Actor	Series	Ref
2000
2000	**Steve Harvey**	**The Steve Harvey Show**	
2000	Jamie Foxx	The Jamie Foxx Show	
2000	Eddie Griffin	Malcolm & Eddie	
2000	D. L. Hughley	The Hughleys	
2000	Steven Williams	Linc's	
2001
2001	**Steve Harvey**	**The Steve Harvey Show**	
2001	Jamie Foxx	The Jamie Foxx Show	
2001	Robert Guillaume	Sports Night	
2001	D. L. Hughley	The Hughleys	
2001	Malcolm Jamal Warner	Malcolm & Eddie	
2002
2002	**Steve Harvey**	**The Steve Harvey Show**	
2002	Michael Boatman	Arliss	
2002	D. L. Hughley	The Hughleys	
2002	Bernie Mac	The Bernie Mac Show	
2002	Damon Wayans	My Wife and Kids	
2003
2003	**Bernie Mac**	**The Bernie Mac Show**	
2003	Flex Alexander	One on One	
2003	Cedric the Entertainer	Cedric the Entertainer Presents	
2003	D. L. Hughley	The Hughleys	
2003	Damon Wayans	My Wife and Kids	
2004
2004	**Bernie Mac**	**The Bernie Mac Show**	
2004	Flex Alexander	One on One	
2004	Dave Chappelle	The Chappelle Show	
2004	George Lopez	The George Lopez Show	
2004	Damon Wayans	My Wife and Kids	
2005
2005	**Bernie Mac**	**The Bernie Mac Show**	
2005	Flex Alexander	One on One	
2005	Dave Chappelle	The Chappelle Show	
2005	George Lopez	The George Lopez Show	
2005	Damon Wayans	My Wife and Kids	
2006
2006	**Bernie Mac**	**The Bernie Mac Show**	
2006	Donald Faison	Scrubs	
2006	Omar Gooding	Barbershop	
2006	George Lopez	The George Lopez Show	
2006	Tyler James Williams	Everybody Hates Chris	
2007
2007	**Tyler James Williams**	**Everybody Hates Chris**	
2007	Donald Faison	Scrubs	
2007	George Lopez	The George Lopez Show	
2007	Bernie Mac	The Bernie Mac Show	
2007	Duane Martin	All of Us	
2008
2008	**LaVan Davis**	**Tyler Perry's House of Payne**	
2008	Donald Faison	Scrubs	
2008	Reggie Hayes	Girlfriends	
2008	Dulé Hill	Psych	
2008	Tyler James Williams	Everybody Hates Chris	
2009
2009	**LaVan Davis**	**Tyler Perry's House of Payne**	
2009	Terry Crews	Everybody Hates Chris	
2009	Donald Faison	Scrubs	
2009	Paul James	Greek	
2009	Tyler James Williams	Everybody Hates Chris	

=== 2010s ===
Year	Actor	Series	Ref
2010
2010	**Daryl Mitchell**	**Brothers**	
2010	LaVan Davis	Tyler Perry's House of Payne	
2010	Donald Faison	Scrubs	
2010	Dulé Hill	Psych	
2010	Tyler James Williams	Everybody Hates Chris	
2011
2011	**David Mann**	**Meet the Browns**	
2011	Terry Crews	Are We There Yet?	
2011	LaVan Davis	Tyler Perry's House of Payne	
2011	Dulé Hill	Psych	
2011	Phil Morris	Love That Girl!	
2012
2012	**Malcolm-Jamal Warner**	**Reed Between the Lines**	
2012	Terry Crews	Are We There Yet?	
2012	Dulé Hill	Psych	
2012	Pooch Hall	The Game	
2012	Phil Morris	Love That Girl!	
2013
2013	**Don Cheadle**	**House of Lies**	
2013	Anthony Anderson	Guys with Kids	
2013	Hosea Chanchez	The Game	
2013	Donald Faison	The Exes	
2013	Damon Wayans Jr.	Happy Endings	
2014
2014	**Kevin Hart**	**Real Husbands of Hollywood**	
2014	André Braugher	Brooklyn Nine-Nine	
2014	Cedric the Entertainer	The Soul Man	
2014	Don Cheadle	House of Lies	
2014	Dulé Hill	Psych	
2015
2015	**Anthony Anderson**	**Black-ish**	
2015	André Braugher	Brooklyn Nine-Nine	
2015	Don Cheadle	House of Lies	
2015	Kevin Hart	Real Husbands of Hollywood	
2015	Keegan-Michael Key	Key & Peele	
2016
2016	**Anthony Anderson**	**Black-ish**	
2016	André Braugher	Brooklyn Nine-Nine	
2016	Don Cheadle	House of Lies	
2016	Dwayne Johnson	Ballers	
2016	RonReaco Lee	Survivor's Remorse	
2017
2017	**Anthony Anderson**	**Black-ish**	
2017	Don Cheadle	House of Lies	
2017	Donald Glover	Atlanta	
2017	Kevin Hart	Real Husbands of Hollywood	
2017	Dwayne Johnson	Ballers	
2018
2018	**Anthony Anderson**	**Black-ish**	
2018	Aziz Ansari	Master of None	
2018	Dwayne Johnson	Ballers	
2018	Keegan-Michael Key	Friends from College	
2018	RonReaco Lee	Survivor's Remorse	
2019
2019	**Anthony Anderson**	**Black-ish**	
2019	Donald Glover	Atlanta	
2019	Cedric the Entertainer	The Neighborhood	
2019	Dwayne Johnson	Ballers	
2019	Tracy Morgan	The Last O.G.	

=== 2020s ===
Year	Actor	Series	Ref
2020
2020	**Anthony Anderson**	**Blackish**	
2020	Cedric the Entertainer	The Neighborhood	
2020	Don Cheadle	Black Monday	
2020	Dwayne Johnson	Ballers	
2020	Tracy Morgan	The Last O.G.	
2021
2021	**Anthony Anderson**	**Blackish**	
2021	Cedric the Entertainer	The Neighborhood	
2021	Don Cheadle	Black Monday	
2021	Tracy Morgan	The Last O.G.	
2021	Idris Elba	In the Long Run	
2022
2022	**Anthony Anderson**	**Blackish**	
2022	Cedric the Entertainer	The Neighborhood	
2022	Don Cheadle	Black Monday	
2022	Jay Ellis	Insecure	
2022	Elisha 'EJ' Williams	The Wonder Years	

== Multiple wins and nominations ==
=== Wins ===
8 wins

- Anthony Anderson

4 wins

- Steve Harvey
- Bernie Mac

2 wins

- Bill Cosby
- LaVan Davis
- Kadeem Hardison
- Martin Lawrence

=== Nominations ===
9 nominations

- Anthony Anderson

8 nominations

- Don Cheadle

6 nominations

- Cedric the Entertainer
- Don Cheadle
- Donald Faison
- Bernie Mac

5 nominations

- Steve Harvey
- Dulé Hill
- D. L. Hughley
- Dwayne Johnson
- Tyler James Williams

4 nominations

- Cedric the Entertainer
- LaVan Davis
- Jamie Foxx
- George Lopez
- Damon Wayans

3 nominations

- Flex Alexander
- André Braugher
- Terry Crews
- LL Cool J
- Kevin Hart
- Martin Lawrence
- Tracy Morgan

2 nominations

- Terrence C. Carson
- Dave Chappelle
- Bill Cosby
- Donald Glover
- Robert Guillaume
- Kadeem Hardison
- Keegan-Michael Key
- Phil Morris
- Will Smith
- Malcolm-Jamal Warner
- Jaleel White
