= NAACP Image Award for Outstanding Female Artist =

American music award

This article lists the winners and nominees for the NAACP Image Award for Outstanding Female Artist. Beyoncé currently holds the record for most wins in this category with seven.

== Winners and nominees ==
Winners are listed first and highlighted in bold.

=== 1980s ===
Year	Artist	Ref
1980
1980	**Dionne Warwick**	
1981 – 82	—N/a	
1983
1983	**Aretha Franklin**	
1984 – 85	—N/a	
1986
1986	**Anita Baker**	
1986	Whitney Houston	
1986	Janet Jackson	
1986	Patti LaBelle	
1987
1987	**Aretha Franklin**	
1987	Whitney Houston	
1987	Phyllis Hyman	
1987	Stephanie Mills	
1987	Natalie Cole	
1988
1988	**Natalie Cole**	
1988	Meli'sa Morgan	
1988	Miki Howard	
1988	Dianne Reeves	
1988	Brenda Russell	
1989
1989	**Stephanie Mills**	
1989	Natalie Cole	
1989	Roberta Flack	
1989	Aretha Franklin	
1989	Patti LaBelle	

=== 1990s ===
Year	Artist	Ref
1990
1990	**Anita Baker**	
1991	—N/a	
1992
1992	**Natalie Cole**	
1992	Whitney Houston	
1992	Anita Baker	
1992	Gladys Knight	
1992	Oleta Adams	
1993
1993	**Vanessa Williams**	
1994
1994	**Whitney Houston**	
1994	Aretha Franklin	
1994	Janet Jackson	
1994	Sade	
1994	Toni Braxton	
1995	—N/a	
1996
1996	**Whitney Houston**	
1996	Anita Baker	
1996	Brandy	
1996	Mariah Carey	
1996	Vanessa Williams	
1997
1997	**Toni Braxton**	
1997	Tracy Chapman	
1997	Natalie Cole	
1997	Chaka Khan	
1997	Vanessa Williams	
1998
1998	**Erykah Badu**	
1998	Vanessa Williams	
1998	Toni Braxton	
1998	Mariah Carey	
1998	Mary J. Blige	
1999
1999	**Lauryn Hill**	
1999	Aretha Franklin	
1999	Brandy	
1999	Patti LaBelle	
1999	Whitney Houston	

=== 2000s ===
Year	Artist	Ref
2000
2000	**Whitney Houston**	
2000	Mary J. Blige	
2000	Deborah Cox	
2000	Faith Evans	
2000	Monica	
2001
2001	**Yolanda Adams**	
2001	Erykah Badu	
2001	Mary J. Blige	
2001	Toni Braxton	
2001	Jill Scott	
2002
2002	**Aaliyah**	
2002	India.Arie	
2002	Janet Jackson	
2002	Alicia Keys	
2002	Jill Scott	
2003
2003	**India.Arie**	
2003	Ashanti	
2003	Erykah Badu	
2003	Mary J. Blige	
2003	Missy Elliott	
2004
2004	**Alicia Keys**	
2004	Beyoncé	
2004	Mary J. Blige	
2004	Aretha Franklin	
2004	Heather Headley	
2005
2005	**Fantasia**	
2005	Janet Jackson	
2005	Patti LaBelle	
2005	Queen Latifah	
2005	Jill Scott	
2006
2006	**Alicia Keys**	
2006	Mary J. Blige	
2006	Toni Braxton	
2006	Mariah Carey	
2006	India.Arie	
2007
2007	**Mary J. Blige**	
2007	Corinne Bailey Rae	
2007	Beyoncé	
2007	Fantasia	
2007	India.Arie	
2008
2008	**Alicia Keys**	
2008	Beyoncé	
2008	Mary J. Blige	
2008	Aretha Franklin	
2008	Jill Scott	
2009
2009	**Beyoncé**	
2009	Mariah Carey	
2009	Jennifer Hudson	
2009	Alicia Keys	
2009	Rihanna	

=== 2010s ===
Year	Artist	Ref
2010
2010	**Mary J. Blige**	
2010	Whitney Houston	
2010	India.Arie	
2010	Alicia Keys	
2010	Rihanna	
2011
2011	**Mary J. Blige**	
2011	Corinne Bailey Rae	
2011	Chrisette Michele	
2011	Rihanna	
2011	Sade	
2012
2012	**Jill Scott**	
2012	Beyoncé	
2012	Mary J. Blige	
2012	Jennifer Hudson	
2012	Ledisi	
2013
2013	**Alicia Keys**	
2013	Missy Elliott	
2013	Estelle	
2013	Tamela Mann	
2013	Elle Varner	
2014
2014	**Beyoncé**	
2014	Mary J. Blige	
2014	India.Arie	
2014	Ledisi	
2014	Janelle Monáe	
2015
2015	**Beyoncé**	
2015	Mary J. Blige	
2015	Jennifer Hudson	
2015	Alicia Keys	
2015	Ledisi	
2016
2016	**Jill Scott**	
2016	Lalah Hathaway	
2016	Lauryn Hill	
2016	Janet Jackson	
2016	Jazmine Sullivan	
2017
2017	**Beyoncé**	
2017	Fantasia	
2017	Alicia Keys	
2017	K. Michelle	
2017	Solange	
2018
2018	**Mary J. Blige**	
2018	Beyoncé	
2018	Andra Day	
2018	Ledisi	
2018	SZA	
2019
2019	**H.E.R.**	
2019	Andra Day	
2019	Janet Jackson	
2019	Ella Mai	
2019	Janelle Monáe	

=== 2020s ===
Year	Artist	Ref
2020
2020	**Beyoncé**	
2020	Fantasia	
2020	H.E.R.	
2020	India.Arie	
2020	Lizzo	
2021
2021	**Beyoncé**	
2021	H.E.R.	
2021	Jazmine Sullivan	
2021	Ledisi	
2021	Alicia Keys	
2022
2022	**Jazmine Sullivan**	
2022	Ari Lennox	
2022	Beyoncé	
2022	Chlöe	
2022	H.E.R.	
2023
2023	**Beyoncé**	
2023	Ari Lennox	
2023	Chlöe	
2023	Jazmine Sullivan	
2023	SZA	
2024
2024	**H.E.R.**	
2024	Ari Lennox	
2024	Janelle Monáe	
2024	Tems	
2024	Victoria Monét	
2025
2025	**Beyoncé**	
2025	Coco Jones	
2025	Doechii	
2025	GloRilla	
2025	H.E.R.	
2026
2026	**Cardi B**	
2026	Alex Isley	
2026	Doechii	
2026	SZA	
2026	Teyana Taylor	

== Multiple wins and nominations ==
=== Wins ===
8 wins

- Beyoncé

4 wins

- Alicia Keys
- Mary J. Blige

3 wins

- Whitney Houston

=== Nominations ===
14 nominations

- Beyoncé
- Mary J. Blige

9 nominations

- Alicia Keys

7 nominations

- India.Arie

6 nominations

- Jill Scott
- Janet Jackson

5 nominations

- Whitney Houston
- Ledisi

4 nominations

- Mariah Carey
- Fantasia
- Jazmine Sullivan

3 nominations

- Erykah Badu
- Toni Braxton
- H.E.R.
- Jennifer Hudson
- Rihanna
- SZA

2 nominations

- Chlöe
- Corinne Bailey Rae
- Natalie Cole
- Andra Day
- Doechii
- Missy Elliott
- Aretha Franklin
- Lauryn Hill
- Ari Lennox
- Janelle Monáe
- Vanessa Williams
