= NAACP Image Award for Outstanding Comedy Series =

This article lists the winners and nominees for the NAACP Image Award for Outstanding Comedy Series. This category was first awarded during the 1988 ceremony and since its inception, Black-ish holds the records for most wins with six.

== Winners and nominees ==
Winners are listed first and highlighted in bold.

=== 1980s ===
Year	Series	Ref
1988
1988	**The Cosby Show**	
1989
1989	**Muppet Babies**	

=== 1990s ===
Year	Series	Ref
1990
1990	**Muppet Babies**	
1991
1991	**A Different World**	
1991	The Cosby Show	
1991	Fresh Prince of Bel Air	
1991	Family Matters	
1991	In Living Color	
1992
1992	**In Living Color**	
1992	A Different World	
1992	The Cosby Show	
1992	Fresh Prince of Bel Air	
1992	Family Matters	
1993
1993	**The Fresh Prince of Bel-Air**	
1994
1994	**Martin**	
1994	Living Single	
1994	Roc	
1994	Fresh Prince of Bel Air	
1994	Where I Live	
1995
1995	**Martin**	
1996
1996	**Living Single**	
1996	The Fresh Prince of Bel-Air	
1996	In the House	
1996	Martin	
1996	Sister, Sister	
1997
1997	**Cosby**	
1997	The Fresh Prince of Bel-Air	
1997	Living Single	
1997	Martin	
1997	Moesha	
1998
1998	**Living Single**	
1998	Cosby	
1998	The Gregory Hines Show	
1998	Moesha	
1998	The Steve Harvey Show	
1999
1999	**Cosby**	
1999	The Jamie Foxx Show	
1999	Moesha	
1999	Sister, Sister	
1999	The Steve Harvey Show	

=== 2000s ===
Year	Series	Ref
2000
2000	**The Steve Harvey Show**	
2000	The Cosby Mysteries	
2000	For Your Love	
2000	The Hughleys	
2000	Linc's	
2001
2001	**The Steve Harvey Show**	
2001	For Your Love	
2001	The Hughleys	
2001	The Jamie Foxx Show	
2001	The Parkers	
2002
2002	**The Steve Harvey Show**	
2002	The Bernie Mac Show	
2002	Girlfriends	
2002	The Hughleys	
2002	My Wife and Kids	
2003
2003	**The Bernie Mac Show**	
2003	Girlfriends	
2003	My Wife and Kids	
2003	One on One	
2003	The Parkers	
2004
2004	**The Bernie Mac Show**	
2004	Girlfriends	
2004	Half & Half	
2004	My Wife and Kids	
2004	Whoopi	
2005
2005	**The Bernie Mac Show**	
2005	Chappelle's Show	
2005	Girlfriends	
2005	Half & Half	
2005	My Wife and Kids	
2006
2006	**Everybody Hates Chris**	
2006	The Bernie Mac Show	
2006	The Boondocks	
2006	Girlfriends	
2006	Half & Half	
2007
2007	**Ugly Betty**	
2007	All of Us	
2007	The Bernie Mac Show	
2007	Everybody Hates Chris	
2007	Girlfriends	
2008
2008	**Tyler Perry's House of Payne**	
2008	30 Rock	
2008	Everybody Hates Chris	
2008	Girlfriends	
2008	Ugly Betty	
2009
2009	**Tyler Perry's House of Payne**	
2009	30 Rock	
2009	Everybody Hates Chris	
2009	The Game	
2009	Ugly Betty	

=== 2010s ===
Year	Series	Ref
2010
2010	**Tyler Perry's House of Payne**	
2010	30 Rock	
2010	Everybody Hates Chris	
2010	Glee	
2010	Ugly Betty	
2011
2011	**Tyler Perry's House of Payne**	
2011	30 Rock	
2011	Are We There Yet?	
2011	Glee	
2011	Modern Family	
2012
2012	**Tyler Perry's House of Payne**	
2012	The Game	
2012	Love That Girl!	
2012	Modern Family	
2012	Reed Between the Lines	
2013
2013	**The Game**	
2013	Glee	
2013	The Mindy Project	
2013	Modern Family	
2013	The Soul Man	
2014
2014	**Real Husbands of Hollywood**	
2014	The Game	
2014	House of Lies	
2014	Modern Family	
2014	The Soul Man	
2015
2015	**Black-ish**	
2015	House of Lies	
2015	Key & Peele	
2015	Orange Is the New Black	
2015	Real Husbands of Hollywood	
2016
2016	**Black-ish**	
2016	House of Lies	
2016	Key & Peele	
2016	Orange Is the New Black	
2016	Survivor's Remorse	
2017
2017	**Black-ish**	
2017	Atlanta	
2017	Insecure	
2017	Survivor's Remorse	
2017	The Carmichael Show	
2018
2018	**Black-ish**	
2018	Ballers	
2018	Dear White People	
2018	Insecure	
2018	Survivor's Remorse	
2019
2019	**Black-ish**	
2019	Atlanta	
2019	Insecure	
2019	Grown-ish	
2019	Dear White People	

=== 2020s ===
Year	Series	Ref
2020
2020	**Black-ish**	
2020	Ballers	
2020	Dear White People	
2020	Grown-ish	
2020	The Neighborhood	
2021
2021	**Insecure**	
2021	blackAF	
2021	Black-ish	
2021	Grown-ish	
2021	The Last O.G.	
2022
2022	**Insecure**	
2022	Black-ish	
2022	Harlem	
2022	Run the World	
2022	The Upshaws	
2023
2023	**Abbott Elementary**	
2023	Atlanta	
2023	Black-ish	
2023	Rap Sh!t	
2023	The Wonder Years	
2024
2024	**Abbott Elementary**	
2024	Harlem	
2024	Survival of the Thickest	
2024	The Neighborhood	
2024	UnPrisoned	
2025
2025	**Abbott Elementary**	
2025	How to Die Alone	
2025	Poppa's House	
2025	The Neighborhood	
2025	The Upshaws	
2026
2026	Abbott Elementary	
2026	Harlem	
2026	Survival of the Thickest	
2026	The Residence	
2026	The Upshaws	

== Multiple wins and nominations ==
=== Wins ===
6 wins

- Black-ish

5 wins

- Tyler Perry's House of Payne

3 wins

- Abbott Elementary
- The Bernie Mac Show
- The Steve Harvey Show

2 wins

- Cosby
- Insecure
- Living Single
- Martin
- Muppet Babies

=== Nominations ===
9 nominations

- Black-ish

7 nominations

- Girlfriends

6 nominations

- The Bernie Mac Show

5 nominations

- Everybody Hates Chris
- Insecure
- The Steve Harvey Show
- Tyler Perry's House of Payne

4 nominations

- 30 Rock
- Abbott Elementary
- The Game
- Martin
- Modern Family
- My Wife and Kids
- Ugly Betty
- Fresh Prince of Bel-Air

3 nominations

- Atlanta
- Cosby
- Dear White People
- Glee
- Grown-ish
- Harlem
- Half & Half
- House of Lies
- Living Single
- Moesha
- Survivor's Remorse
- The Hughleys
- The Neighborhood
- The Upshaws

2 nominations

- Ballers
- For Your Love
- Key & Peele
- Muppet Babies
- Orange Is the New Black
- Real Husbands of Hollywood
- Sister, Sister
- Survival of the Thickest
- The Cosby Show
- The Jamie Foxx Show
- The Parkers
- The Soul Man
