= NAACP Image Award – Hall of Fame Award =

List of NAACP Image Award recipients

This award has been given to prestigious people such as Ray Charles, Aretha Franklin, Sidney Poitier, Little Richard, and Spike Lee. The NAACP Image Award winners for the Hall of Fame Award:

Year	Inductee	Ref.
1983	Lena Horne	
1983	Ray Charles	
1984	Ella Fitzgerald; Marian Anderson; Gordon Parks; Alberta Hunter; Paul Robeson	
1987	Esther Rolle; Linda Hopkins	
1988	Marvin Gaye	
1989	Sammy Davis Jr. Oprah Winfrey; Ossie Davis; Ruby Dee	
1990	Etta James	
1992	The Four Tops; The O'Jays; The Temptations; The Dells	
1993	Carmen McRae; Jerry Butler	
1994	Earth, Wind and Fire	
1996	Richard Pryor	
1997	Aretha Franklin; George Clinton	
1998	Nancy Wilson; The Isley Brothers	
1999	Kathleen Battle	
2000	Smokey Robinson	
2001	Sidney Poitier	
2002	Little Richard	
2003	Spike Lee	
2004	Ray Charles	
2005	Oprah Winfrey	
2006	Carlos Santana	
2007	Bill Cosby	
2008	Stevie Wonder	
2009	Clarence Avant	
2021	Eddie Murphy	
2025	Wayans Family	
2026	Salt-N-Pepa; DJ Spinderella	
