= NAACP Image Award for Outstanding Gospel Artist =

Former American music award

This article lists the winners and nominees for the NAACP Image Award for Outstanding Gospel Artist. The award was first given during the 1980 ceremony and was later retired in 2009. During the years 2000 to 2002, the category was adjusted to award contemporary and traditional gospel artists separately. It was reverted in 2003. Since its conception, Kirk Franklin holds the record for most wins in this category with five. Yolanda Adams holds the record for the most wins in this category for female artists.

== Winners and nominees ==
Winners are listed first and highlighted in bold.

=== 1980s ===
Year	Artist	Ref
1980
1980	**Andraé Crouch**	
1987
1987	**Shirley Caesar**	
1987	Al Green	
1987	Tramaine Hawkins	
1987	Jackson Southernaires	
1987	BeBe and CeCe Winans	
1989
1989	**BeBe and CeCe Winans**	
1989	The Clark Sisters	
1989	L.A. Mass Choir	
1989	Keith Pringle	
1989	West Angeles Angelic Choir	

=== 1990s ===
Year	Artist	Ref
1990
1990	**BeBe and CeCe Winans**	
1991	—N/a	
1992
1992	**BeBe and CeCe Winans**	
1992	Sounds of Blackness	
1992	Tramaine Hawkins	
1992	Jessye Norman & Kathleen Battle	
1992	Take 6	
1993
1993	**BeBe and CeCe Winans**	
1994
1994	**The Winans**	
1995	—N/a	
1996
1996	**Kirk Franklin and the Family**	
1997
1997	**Whitney Houston and the Georgia Mass Choir**	
1997	BeBe and CeCe Winans	
1997	Kirk Franklin and the Family	
1997	Shirley Caesar	
1997	Take 6	
1998
1998	**God's Property**	
1999
1999	**Kirk Franklin**	
1999	CeCe Winans	
1999	Fred Hammond	
1999	Shirley Caesar	
1999	Yolanda Adams	

=== 2000s ===
Year	Artist	Ref
2000
2000	**Vickie Winans (Traditional)**	
2000	**Yolanda Adams (Contemporary)**	
2001
2001	**Aaron Neville (Traditional)**	
2001	**Yolanda Adams (Contemporary)**	
2002
2002	**Shirley Caesar (Traditional)**	
2002	**Yolanda Adams (Contemporary)**	
2003
2003	**Kirk Franklin**	
2003	Mary Mary	
2004
2004	**Donnie McClurkin**	
2004	Shirley Caesar	
2004	Byron Cage	
2004	Bishop TD Jakes and The Potter's House Mass Choir	
2004	Vickie Winans	
2005
2005	**Ben Harper and The Blind Boys of Alabama**	
2006
2006	**Yolanda Adams**	
2006	Kirk Franklin	
2006	Mary Mary	
2006	Donnie McClurkin	
2006	CeCe Winans	
2007
2007	**Kirk Franklin**	
2007	The Cast of Inspired By...The Bible Experience	
2007	Andraé Crouch	
2007	Fred Hammond	
2007	Patti LaBelle	
2008
2008	**Kirk Franklin**	
2008	Yolanda Adams	
2008	Sounds of Blackness	
2008	Mavis Staples	
2008	Marvin Winans	
2009
2009	**Mary Mary**	

== Multiple wins and nominations ==
=== Wins ===
5 wins

- Kirk Franklin

4 wins

- Yolanda Adams
- BeBe and CeCe Winans

=== Nominations ===
6 nominations

- Kirk Franklin

5 nominations

- Yolanda Adams
- CeCe Winans

4 nominations

- BeBe and CeCe Winans

3 nominations

- Mary Mary

2 nominations

- Shirley Caesar
- Donnie McClurkin
- Vickie Winans
