= 35th NAACP Image Awards =

American entertainment awards for 2003 works

- Date: March 6, 2004
- Site: Universal Amphitheatre, Los Angeles, California
- Hosted by: Jill Marie Jones, Persia White, Golden Brooks, Tracee Ellis Ross
- Official website: NAACPImageAwards.net

Highlights
- Best Picture: The Fighting Temptations
- Best Comedy Series: The Bernie Mac Show
- Best Drama Series: Soul Food

Television coverage
- Network: Fox

The 35th NAACP Image Awards ceremony, presented by the National Association for the Advancement of Colored People (NAACP), honored outstanding representations and achievements of people of color in motion pictures, television, music, and literature during the 2003 calendar year. The ceremony took place on March 6, 2004 and aired on March 11, 2004 on Fox. It was hosted by Jill Marie Jones, Persia White, Golden Brooks and Tracee Ellis Ross.

American preacher T. D. Jakes was honored with the President's Award. The Dave Matthews Band was recognized with the Chairman's Award, while American singer and actress Beyoncé was awarded as the Entertainer of the Year. During the ceremony Ray Charles was inducted into the NAACP Hall of Fame, three months before his death at 73 on June 10, 2004.

The following is a listing of nominees, with winners in bold:

== Special awards ==
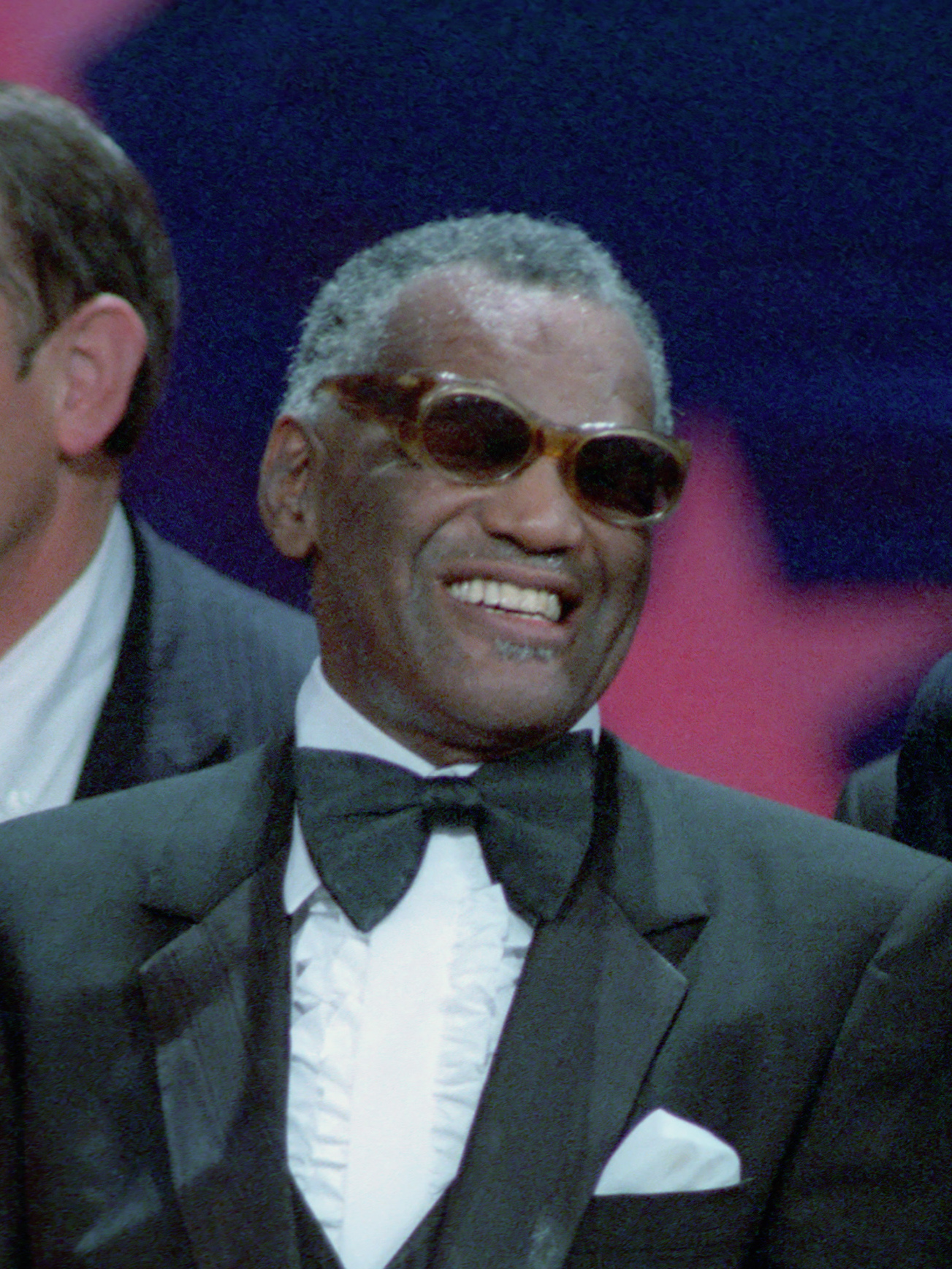
Ray Charles was included into the Hall of Fame.

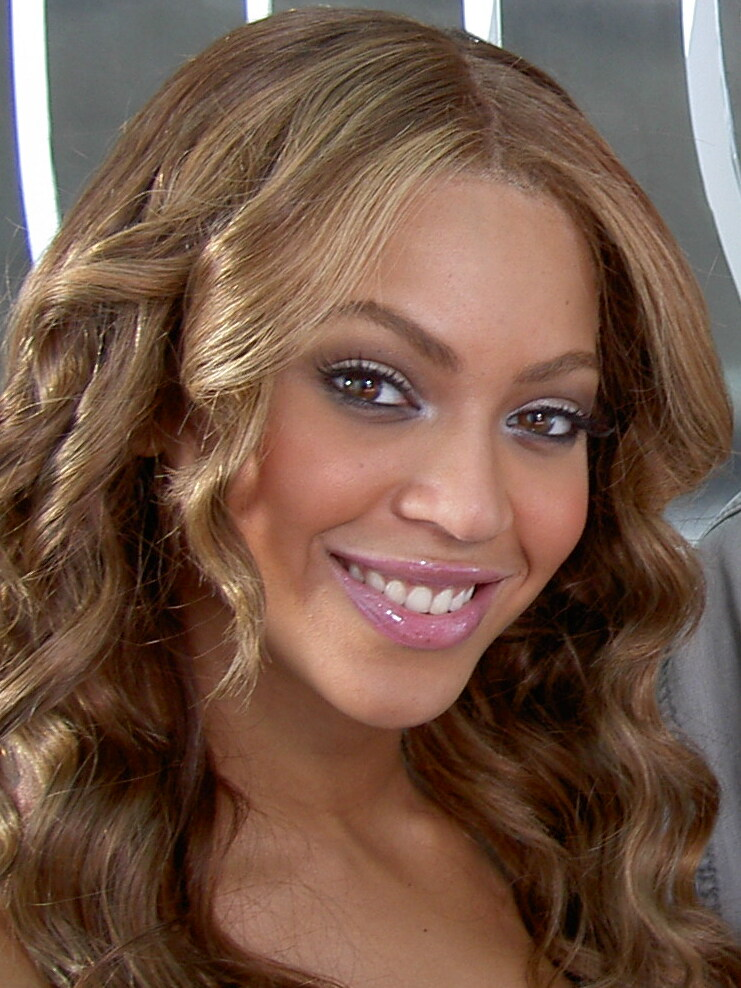
Beyoncé won her first Entertainer of the Year Award.

President's Award
- **T. D. Jakes**
Chairman's Award
- **Dave Matthews Band**
Hall of Fame
- **Ray Charles**
Entertainer of the Year
- **Beyoncé**

== Winners and nominees ==
=== Motion Picture ===
Outstanding Motion Picture
**The Fighting Temptations**; Bad Boys II; Bend It Like Beckham; Deliver Us from Eva; Whale Rider
Outstanding Actor in a Motion Picture	Outstanding Actress in a Motion Picture
**Cuba Gooding Jr. – Radio**; Samuel L. Jackson – S.W.A.T.; Will Smith – Bad Boys II; Denzel Washington – Out of Time; Laurence Fishburne – The Matrix Revolutions	**Queen Latifah – Bringing Down the House**; Halle Berry – Gothika; Beyoncé – The Fighting Temptations; Keisha Castle-Hughes – Whale Rider; Gabrielle Union – Deliver Us from Eva
Outstanding Supporting Actor in a Motion Picture	Outstanding Supporting Actress in a Motion Picture
**Morgan Freeman – Bruce Almighty**; Bernie Mac – Head of State; Charles S. Dutton – Gothika; Djimon Hounsou – In America; Forest Whitaker – Phone Booth	**Alfre Woodard – Radio**; Gabrielle Union – Bad Boys II; Jada Pinkett Smith – The Matrix Revolutions; Nona Gaye – The Matrix Revolutions; Sanaa Lathan – Out of Time

=== Television ===
==== Drama ====
Outstanding Drama Series
**Soul Food**; 24; Boston Public; CSI: Miami; The Wire
Outstanding Actor in a Drama Series	Outstanding Actress in a Drama Series
**Steve Harris – The Practice**; Gary Dourdan – CSI: Crime Scene Investigation; Jesse L. Martin – Law & Order; Dennis Haysbert – 24; Wendell Pierce – The Wire	**Nia Long – Third Watch**; Nicole Ari Parker – Soul Food; C. C. H. Pounder – The Shield; Malinda Williams – Soul Food; Vanessa A. Williams – Soul Food
Outstanding Supporting Actor in a Drama Series	Outstanding Supporting Actress in a Drama Series
**Mekhi Phifer – ER**; Darrin Henson – Soul Food; Dulé Hill – The West Wing; Boris Kodjoe – Soul Food; Ice-T – Law & Order: Special Victims Unit	**Loretta Devine – Boston Public**; Vanessa Bell Calloway – The District; Pam Grier – Law & Order: Special Victims Unit; Terri J. Vaughn – Soul Food; Anna Deavere Smith – The District

==== Comedy ====
Outstanding Comedy Series
**The Bernie Mac Show**; Girlfriends; Half & Half; Whoopi; My Wife and Kids
Outstanding Actor in a Comedy Series	Outstanding Actress in a Comedy Series
**Bernie Mac – The Bernie Mac Show**; Dave Chappelle – The Chappelle Show; George Lopez – The George Lopez Show; Flex Alexander – One on One; Damon Wayans – My Wife and Kids	**Mo'Nique – The Parkers**; Tisha Campbell-Martin – My Wife and Kids; Tracee Ellis Ross – Girlfriends; Kellita Smith – The Bernie Mac Show; Whoopi Goldberg – Whoopi
Outstanding Supporting Actor in a Comedy Series	Outstanding Supporting Actress in a Comedy Series
**Dorien Wilson – The Parkers**; Chico Benymon – Half & Half; Blair Underwood – Sex and the City; George O. Gore II – My Wife and Kids; Jeremy Suarez – The Bernie Mac Show	**Camille Winbush – The Bernie Mac Show**; Dee Dee Davis – The Bernie Mac Show; Kyla Pratt – One on One; Telma Hopkins – Half & Half; Valarie Pettiford – Half & Half

==== Television Movie, Limited-Series or Dramatic Special ====
Outstanding Television Movie, Mini-Series or Dramatic Special
**D.C. Sniper: 23 Days of Fear**; Good Fences; Jasper, Texas; Deacons for Defense; Sounder
Outstanding Actor in a Television Movie, Mini-Series or Dramatic Special	Outstanding Actress in a Television Movie, Mini-Series or Dramatic Special
**Charles S. Dutton – D.C. Sniper: 23 Days of Fear**; Ossie Davis – Deacons for Defense; Louis Gossett Jr. – Jasper, Texas; Forest Whitaker – Deacons for Defense; Danny Glover – Good Fences	**Whoopi Goldberg – Good Fences**; Suzzanne Douglas – Sounder; Mo'Nique – Good Fences; Vanessa Ferlito – Undefeated

Daytime Drama Series

Outstanding Actor in a Daytime Drama Series	Outstanding Actress in a Daytime Drama Series
**Kristoff St. John – The Young and the Restless**; Tyler Christopher – General Hospital; Keith Hamilton Cobb – The Young and the Restless; James Reynolds – Days of Our Lives; Timothy D. Stickney – One Life to Live	**Victoria Rowell – The Young and the Restless**; Tracey Ross – Passions; Tamara Tunie – As the World Turns; Renée Elise Goldsberry – One Life to Live; Tonya Lee Williams – The Young and the Restless

==== Overall acting ====
Outstanding Performance by a Youth (Series, Special, Television Movie or Limited-series)
- **Raven-Symoné – That's So Raven**
  - Tommy Davidson – The Proud Family
  - Kyla Pratt – The Proud Family
  - Cree Summer – All Grown Up!
  - Lynn Whitfield – The Cheetah Girls

==== Reality and Variety ====
Outstanding News/Information – Series or Special	Outstanding Variety – Series or Special
**Judge Mathis**; 106 & Park: Top 10 Live; American Experience; Brother Outsider: The Life of Bayard Rustin; Unchained Memories: Readings from the Slave Narratives	**The 2003 Essence Awards**; BET Awards 2003; The 11th Annual Trumpet Awards; Chappelle's Show; Def Poetry Jam

=== Recording ===
Outstanding Album
**Luther Vandross** **– Dance with My Father**; R. Kelly – Chocolate Factory; Alicia Keys – The Diary of Alicia Keys; Mary J. Blige – Love & Life; Outkast – Speakerboxxx/The Love Below
Outstanding Male Artist	Outstanding Female Artist
**Luther Vandross**; Mos Def; Gerald Levert; Musiq Soulchild; Seal	**Alicia Keys**; Beyoncé; Mary J. Blige; Aretha Franklin; Heather Headley
Outstanding Duo or Group	Outstanding New Artist
**OutKast**; Mary J. Blige and Eve; The Neptunes; The Roots; The Black Eyed Peas	**Ruben Studdard – Soulful**; Beyoncé – Dangerously in Love; Byron Cage – Byron Cage; Anthony Hamilton – Comin’ from Where I'm From; Heather Headley – This is Who I Am
Outstanding Song	Outstanding Music Video
**Luther Vandross – "Dance with My Father"**; Alicia Keys – "You Don't Know My Name"; Beyoncé and Jay-Z – "Crazy in Love"; Outkast – "Hey Ya!"; Outkast – "The Way You Move"	**"Dance with My Father" – Luther Vandross, directed by Diane Martel**; "Crazy in Love" Beyoncé and Jay-Z, directed by Jake Nava; "The Truth" – India Arie, directed by Sanaa Hamri & India.Arie; "Hey Ya!" – Outkast, directed by Bryan Barber; "The Way You Move" – Outkast, directed by Bryan Barber
Outstanding Gospel Artist	Outstanding Jazz Artist
**Donnie McClurkin – Donnie McClurkin... Again**; Shirley Caesar – Shirley Caesar and Friends; Byron Cage – Byron Cage; Bishop TD Jakes and The Potter's House Mass Choir – A Wing and a Prayer; Vickie Winans – Bringing It All Together	**Ramsey Lewis – Simple Pleasures**; Aaron Neville – Nature Boy: The Standards Album; Dave Koz – Honey-Dipped; Roy Hargrove – Roy Hargrove presents The RH Factor: Hard Groove; Wayman Tisdale – Presents 21 Days

=== Literature ===
Outstanding Literary Work – Fiction	Outstanding Literary Work – Nonfiction
**Love – Toni Morrison**; A Poem Traveled Down My Arm: Poems and Drawings – Alice Walker; Diary of a Groupie – Omar Tyree; The Collected Poetry of Nikki Giovanni – Nikki Giovanni; The Other Woman – Eric Jerome Dickey	**Why I Love Black Women – Michael Eric Dyson**; Always Wear Joy – Susan Fales-Hill; A Right to be Hostile: The Boondocks Treasury – Aaron McGruder; Black Fathers – Kristin Clark Taylor; Growing Up King: An Intimate Memoir – Dexter Scott King
Outstanding Literary Work – Children
**My Brother Martin: A Sister Remembers Growing Up with the Rev. Dr. Martin Luther King Jr. –** Christine King Farris; Events that Shaped America: The Montgomery Bus Boycott – Frank Walsh and Sabrina Crewe; God Created – Mark Francisco Bozzuti-Jones; Li’l Dan the Drummer Boy: A Civil War Story – Romare Bearden; Who's Got Game? The Ant or the Grasshopper? The Lion or the Mouse? Poppy or the Snake? – Toni Morrison and Slade Morrison
