= NAACP Image Award for Outstanding Jazz Artist =

Former American music award

This article lists the winners and nominees for the NAACP Image Award for Outstanding Jazz Artist. The award was first given during the 1980 ceremony and was later retired in 2011. Quincy Jones holds the record for most wins in this category with four.

== Winners and nominees ==
Winners are listed first and highlighted in bold.

=== 1980s ===
Year	Artist	Ref
1980
1980	**Count Basie**	
1981 – 82	—N/a	
1983
1983	**Al Jarreau**	
1984 – 86	—N/a	
1987
1987	**Miles Davis**	
1987	Dexter Gordon	
1987	George Howard	
1987	Al Jarreau	
1987	Najee	
1988
1988	**Ella Fitzgerald**	
1989
1989	**Miles Davis**	
1989	Larry Jackson	
1989	Bobby Lyle	
1989	Joe Sample	
1989	Sherry Winston	

=== 1990s ===
Year	Artist	Ref
1990 – 91	—N/a	
1992
1992	**Natalie Cole**	
1992	Shirley Horn	
1992	Earl Klugh	
1992	Wynton Marsalis	
1992	Dianne Reeves	
1993
1993	**Wynton Marsalis**	
1994
1994	**Kenny G**	
1995	—N/a	
1996
1996	**Quincy Jones**	
1996	Gerald Albright	
1996	George Duke	
1996	Rachelle Farrell	
1996	Dianne Reeves	
1997
1997	**Quincy Jones**	
1997	Cassandra Wilson	
1997	Dianne Reeves	
1997	George Benson	
1997	Branford Marsalis	
1998
1998	**Kenny G**	
1999
1999	**Lena Horne**	
1999	Carmen McRae	
1999	Herbie Hancock	
1999	Najee	
1999	Will Downing & Gerald Albright	

=== 2000s ===
Year	Artist	Ref
2000
2000	**Quincy Jones**	
2000	Branford Marsalis	
2000	Wynton Marsalis	
2000	Dianne Reeves	
2000	Cassandra Wilson	
2001
2001	**Grover Washington, Jr.**	
2002
2002	**Quincy Jones**	
2003
2003	**Natalie Cole**	
2004
2004	**Ramsey Lewis**	
2005
2005	**Nancy Wilson**	
2005	Gerald Albright	
2005	Regina Belle	
2005	Al Jarreau	
2005	Wynton Marsalis	
2006
2006	**Najee**	
2006	Jermaine Gardner	
2006	Onaje Allan Gumbs	
2006	Billy Miles	
2006	Mike Phillips	
2007
2007	**Gladys Knight**	
2007	Gerald Albright	
2007	Regina Carter	
2007	George Duke	
2007	Take 6	
2008 – 09	—N/a	

=== 2010s ===
Year	Artist	Ref
2010	—N/a	
2011
2011	**Stanley Jordan**	

== Multiple wins and nominations ==
=== Wins ===
4 wins

- Quincy Jones

2 wins

- Natalie Cole

=== Nominations ===
4 nominations

- Quincy Jones

3 nominations

- Wynton Marsalis

2 nominations

- Gerald Albright
- Natalie Cole
