= NAACP Image Award for Outstanding Male Artist =

American music award

This article lists the winners and nominees for the NAACP Image Award for Outstanding Male Artist. Currently Luther Vandross holds the record for most wins in this category with five.

== Winners and nominees ==
Winners are listed first and highlighted in bold.

=== 1980s ===
Year	Artist	Ref
1980
1980	**Larry Graham**	
1981 – 82	—N/a	
1983
1983	**Lionel Richie**	
1984 – 87	—N/a	
1988
1988	**Michael Jackson**	
1988	Bobby Brown	
1988	Freddie Jackson	
1988	Teddy Pendergrass	
1988	Stevie Wonder	
1989
1989	**Lou Rawls**	
1989	Babyface	
1989	Peabo Bryson	
1989	James Ingram	
1989	Al Jarreau	

=== 1990s ===
Year	Artist	Ref
1990
1990	**Luther Vandross**	
1991	—N/a	
1992
1992	**Luther Vandross**	
1992	Peabo Bryson	
1992	Ralph Tresvant	
1992	Keith Washington	
1992	Stevie Wonder	
1993
1993	**Stevie Wonder**	
1994
1994	**Luther Vandross**	
1995	—N/a	
1996
1996	**Luther Vandross**	
1996	D'Angelo	
1996	Michael Jackson	
1996	Barry White	
1996	Stevie Wonder	
1997
1997	**Babyface**	
1997	B.B. King	
1997	Luther Vandross	
1997	Maxwell	
1997	Prince	
1998
1998	**Babyface**	
1999
1999	**Luther Vandross**	
1999	Brian McKnight	
1999	Kenny Lattimore	
1999	Kirk Franklin	
1999	Maxwell	

=== 2000s ===
Year	Artist	Ref
2000
2000	**Brian McKnight**	
2000	Eric Benét	
2000	Quincy Jones	
2000	Santana	
2000	Will Smith	
2001
2001	**R. Kelly**	
2002
2002	**Luther Vandross**	
2002	Babyface	
2002	Brian McKnight	
2002	Maxwell	
2002	Michael Jackson	
2003
2003	**LL Cool J**	
2003	Mos Def	
2003	Nelly	
2003	Carlos Santana	
2003	Musiq Soulchild	
2004
2004	**Luther Vandross**	
2004	Mos Def	
2004	Gerald Levert	
2004	Seal	
2004	Musiq Soulchild	
2005
2005	**Usher**	
2005	Mos Def	
2005	Anthony Hamilton	
2005	Jay Z	
2005	Prince	
2006
2006	**Jamie Foxx**	
2006	Common	
2006	Kem	
2006	Kanye West	
2006	Stevie Wonder	
2007
2007	**Prince**	
2007	Jay Z	
2007	John Legend	
2007	Chris Brown	
2007	Lionel Richie	
2008
2008	**Chris Brown**	
2008	Common	
2008	Prince	
2008	Seal	
2008	Kanye West	
2009
2009	**Jamie Foxx**	
2009	Chris Brown	
2009	Common	
2009	John Legend	
2009	will.i.am	

=== 2010s ===
Year	Artist	Ref
2010
2010	**Maxwell**	
2010	Anthony Hamilton	
2010	Jay Z	
2010	Ne-Yo	
2010	Charlie Wilson	
2011
2011	**Usher**	
2011	Cee Lo Green	
2011	Jay Z	
2011	Ne-Yo	
2011	Kanye West	
2012
2012	**Cee Lo Green**	
2012	Chris Brown	
2012	Common	
2012	Anthony Hamilton	
2012	Bruno Mars	
2013
2013	**Usher**	
2013	Lupe Fiasco	
2013	Bruno Mars	
2013	Miguel	
2013	Trey Songz	
2014
2014	**John Legend**	
2014	Bruno Mars	
2014	Robin Thicke	
2014	Justin Timberlake	
2014	Charlie Wilson	
2015
2015	**Pharrell Williams**	
2015	Michael Jackson	
2015	Kem	
2015	Kendrick Lamar	
2015	Justin Timberlake	
2016
2016	**Pharrell Williams**	
2016	Tyrese Gibson	
2016	Kendrick Lamar	
2016	The Weeknd	
2016	Charlie Wilson	
2017
2017	**Maxwell**	
2017	Chance the Rapper	
2017	Anthony Hamilton	
2017	Kendrick Lamar	
2017	Bruno Mars	
2018
2018	**Bruno Mars**	
2018	Jay Z	
2018	Kendrick Lamar	
2018	Brian McKnight	
2018	Charlie Wilson	
2019
2019	**Bruno Mars**	
2019	Childish Gambino	
2019	John Legend	
2019	MAJOR.	
2019	Raheem DeVaughn	

=== 2020s ===
Year	Artist	Ref
2020
2020	**Bruno Mars**	
2020	Khalid	
2020	Lil Nas X	
2020	MAJOR.	
2020	PJ Morton	
2021
2021	**Drake**	
2021	Big Sean	
2021	Black Thought	
2021	Charlie Wilson	
2021	John Legend	
2022
2022	**Anthony Hamilton**	
2022	Drake	
2022	Giveon	
2022	J. Cole	
2022	Lil Nas X	
2023
2023	**Chris Brown**	
2023	Brent Faiyaz	
2023	Burna Boy	
2023	Drake	
2023	Kendrick Lamar	
2024
2024	**Usher**	
2024	Burna Boy	
2024	Chris Brown	
2024	Davido	
2024	Jon Batiste	
2025
2025	**Chris Brown**	
2025	J. Cole	
2025	Kendrick Lamar	
2025	October London	
2025	Usher	
2026
2026	**Kendrick Lamar**	
2026	Bryson Tiller	
2026	Chris Brown	
2026	Giveon	
2026	Leon Thomas	

== Multiple wins and nominations ==
=== Wins ===
7 wins

- Luther Vandross

4 wins

- Usher

3 wins

- Bruno Mars
- Chris Brown

2 wins

- Babyface
- Maxwell
- Pharrell Williams
- Jamie Foxx

=== Nominations ===
8 nominations

- Luther Vandross
- Chris Brown

7 nominations

- Bruno Mars
- Kendrick Lamar

5 nominations

- Prince
- Jay Z
- John Legend
- Charlie Wilson
- Stevie Wonder
- Maxwell
- Anthony Hamilton
- Usher

4 nominations

- Common
- Michael Jackson
- Babyface
- Brian McKnight

3 nominations

- Drake
- Mos Def
- Kanye West

2 nominations

- Peabo Bryson
- Cee Lo Green
- Kem
- Lionel Richie
- MAJOR.
- Ne-Yo
- Seal
- Musiq Soulchild
- Justin Timberlake
- Pharrell Williams
- Jamie Foxx
- Lil Nas X
- Burna Boy
- Giveon
