= NAACP Image Award for Outstanding Independent Motion Picture =

American film award

This article lists the winners and nominees for the NAACP Image Award for Outstanding Independent Motion Picture.

== History ==
This award has been given since 2005.

== Winners and nominees ==
Winners are listed first and highlighted in bold.

=== 2000s ===
Year	Film	Ref
2005
2005	**Woman Thou Art Loosed**	
2005	Baadasssss!	
2005	House of Flying Daggers	
2005	Maria Full of Grace	
2005	Moolaadé	
2006
2006	**The Boys of Baraka**	
2006	Cape of Good Hope	
2006	The Constant Gardener	
2006	Mad Hot Ballroom	
2006	Syriana	
2007
2007	**An Inconvenient Truth**	
2007	Curse of the Golden Flower	
2007	Days of Glory	
2007	Tsotsi	
2007	Volver	
2008
2008	**Honeydripper**	
2008	Dirty Laundry	
2008	A Mighty Heart	
2008	My Brother	
2008	Persepolis	
2009
2009	**Slumdog Millionaire**	
2009	Ballast	
2009	Noah's Arc: Jumping the Broom	
2009	Rachel Getting Married	
2009	The Visitor	

=== 2010s ===
Year	Film	Ref
2010
2010	**Precious**	
2010	American Violet	
2010	Amreeka	
2010	Endgame	
2010	Medicine for Melancholy	
2011
2011	**Frankie & Alice**	
2011	Conviction	
2011	La Mission	
2011	Mother and Child	
2011	Night Catches Us	
2012
2012	**Pariah**	
2012	The First Grader	
2012	I Will Follow	
2012	Kinyarwanda	
2012	Mooz-lum	
2013
2013	**Red Tails**	
2013	**Beasts of the Southern Wild**	
2013	Chico and Rita	
2013	Unconditional	
2013	Woman Thou Art Loosed: On the 7th Day	
2014
2014	**Fruitvale Station**	
2014	Blue Caprice	
2014	Dallas Buyers Club	
2014	The Inevitable Defeat of Mister & Pete	
2014	The Trials of Muhammad Ali	
2015
2015	**Belle**	
2015	Dear White People	
2015	Half of a Yellow Sun	
2015	Life of a King	
2015	Jimi: All Is by My Side	
2016
2016	**Beasts of No Nation**	
2016	Brotherly Love	
2016	Chi-Raq	
2016	Infinitely Polar Bear	
2016	Secret in Their Eyes	
2017
2017	**Moonlight**	
2017	Lion	
2017	Loving	
2017	Miles Ahead	
2017	The Birth of a Nation	
2018
2018	**Detroit**	
2018	Last Flag Flying	
2018	Mudbound	
2018	Professor Marston and the Wonder Women	
2018	Wind River	
2019
2019	**If Beale Street Could Talk**	
2019	BlacKkKlansman	
2019	Nappily Ever After	
2019	Sorry to Bother You	
2019	Traffik	

=== 2020s ===
Year	Film	Ref
2020
2020	**Dolemite Is My Name**	
2020	Clemency	
2020	Luce	
2020	Queen & Slim	
2020	The Boy Who Harnessed the Wind	
2021
2021	**The Banker**	
2021	Emperor	
2021	Farewell Amor	
2021	Miss Juneteenth	
2021	The 24th	
2022
2022	**CODA**	
2022	American Skin	
2022	Bruised	
2022	Test Pattern	
2022	The Killing of Kenneth Chamberlain	
2023
2023	**The Inspection**	
2023	Breaking	
2023	Causeway	
2023	Mr. Malcolm's List	
2023	Remember Me: The Mahalia Jackson Story	
2024
2024	**Brother**	
2024	Anatomy of a Fall	
2024	Mami Wata	
2024	Rye Lane	
2024	Society of the Snow	
2025
2025	**Sing Sing**	
2025	Albany Road	
2025	Exhibiting Forgiveness	
2025	Rob Peace	
2025	We Grown Now	
2026
2026	**Love, Brooklyn**	
2026	40 Acres	
2026	Magazine Dreams	
2026	Opus	
2026	Unexpected Christmas	
