= Outstanding Comedy Series =

Outstanding Comedy Series is a category for the following awards:

- Primetime Emmy Award for Outstanding Comedy Series
- NAACP Image Award for Outstanding Comedy Series
