= NAACP Image Awards =

American annual awards ceremony

- Current: 57th NAACP Image Awards
- Awarded for: Excellence in film, television, theatre, music, and literature
- Country: United States
- Presented by: NAACP
- First award: August 13, 1967; 59 years ago
- Website: naacpimageawards.net

The NAACP Image Awards is an annual awards ceremony presented by the American-based National Association for the Advancement of Colored People (NAACP) to honor outstanding performances in film, television, theatre, music, and literature. Over 40 categories of the Image Awards are voted on by the NAACP members. Honorary awards (similar to the Academy Honorary Award) have also been included, such as the President's Award, the Chairman's Award, the Entertainer of the Year, the Activist of the Year, and the Hall of Fame Award. Beyoncé is the most awarded individual with 25 wins as a solo artist.

== History ==
The awards ceremony was conceived by Toni Vaz during an April 1967 NAACP branch meeting in Beverly Hills. Vaz named it the Image Awards as she "wanted a better image for the people who worked in the industry," and wanted to "put this award show together to thank the producers for giving good roles to people of color." Vaz stated that the branch president liked the idea, but when she called members and friends to enlist volunteers for an awards show committee, no one volunteered. Vaz then contacted numerous Black celebrities such as Sammy Davis Jr., who hosted the first meeting of the NAACP Beverly Hills Hollywood Branch in his home; Sidney Poitier, whom she had worked with on the film Porgy and Bess; and Ivan Dixon, an actor, director and producer of Hogan's Heroes at the time. Vaz also wrote letters to secure sponsors for the event and booked the Beverly Hilton Hotel, where the first NAACP Image Awards show was held on August 13, 1967. The ceremony was presented by activists Maggie Hathaway, Sammy Davis Jr. and Willis Edwards, all three of whom were leaders of the Beverly Hills-Hollywood NAACP branch.

Due to changes in timing of the awards, no awards ceremony was held the following years:

- 1973, as the timing was changed to honor a full calendar year early in the following year.
- 1979, as the 11th annual awards were held in June 1978 and the 12th annual awards were held in January 1980. The awards reverted to a "late-in-year" ceremony for 1980 with the 13th annual awards held in December 1980.
- 1991, as the timing returned to early in the following calendar year to honor the previous year's work.
- 1995, when the awards were canceled due to financial concerns.

In 1982, the NAACP Image Awards was televised for the first time with the 15th ceremony. Initially, the NAACP Image Awards aired locally in Los Angeles on KHJ-TV (currently known as KCAL-TV) although the 1982 and 1983 ceremonies were syndicated nationally. Willis Edwards, former president of the Beverly Hills/Hollywood Branch of the NAACP, contacted then-NBC president Brandon Tartikoff to nationally broadcast the 19th NAACP Image Awards, which was held at The Wiltern in Los Angeles on December 14, 1986. The ceremony was broadcast on NBC on January 17, 1987, as a 90-minute special at 11:30 pm, preempting the slot usually filled by Saturday Night Live.

Initially, the Image Awards aired in a late night slot on NBC in the weeks when Saturday Night Live did not air a new episode, but in subsequent years, it aired on primetime on Fox and continued to air on primetime when it returned to NBC. The award show aired as a primetime telecast for the first time on April 23, 1996, for its 27th edition as it began its 16-year run on Fox. The award show was broadcast live for the first time on March 2, 2007, for its 38th edition (the ceremony was broadcast with tape delay prior to 2007). The Image Awards returned to NBC for its 43rd edition in 2012.

From 2014 to 2018, the Black-owned cable network TV One aired the Image Awards. The awards currently air on BET with a simulcast on its sister networks including CBS.

The New York firm Society Awards manufactures the trophy since its redesign in 2008.

=== Cultural impact ===
The NAACP Image Awards has received national attention and dubbed as the "Black Oscars/Emmys/Grammys" award show from the African-American and Latino community, as it is an important prestigious award celebrating artists and entertainers of color that may have been overlooked from by the mainstream film, television, theater and music award counterparts (EGOT) due to racial seclusion or low interest from film and television studios. Whereas, it created more exposure for content on a wide spectrum of urban media versus other awards shows where they can be celebrated and appreciated. Actors such as Will Smith, Jada Pinkett-Smith, Taraji P. Henson and many others expressed the differences of not being visually seen by the industry's standard and how artists and entertainers should look to the NAACP Image Awards as the highest achievement. The campaign of #OscarSoWhite began as a protest after seeing few people of color being nominated or win in major categories at the Academy Awards. Since then, minor adjustments have been made for inclusion as more people of color have become nominated and win at the mainstream prestigious award ceremonies.

=== Event dates and locations ===
| # | Date | Host(s) | Location |
|---|---|---|---|
| 1st | August 13, 1967 | Maggie Hathaway, Sammy Davis Jr., Willis Edwards | The Beverly Hilton |
| 2nd | September 22, 1968 | | The Beverly Hilton |
| 3rd | October 11, 1969 | | |
| 4th | November 15, 1970 | | |
| 5th | November 21, 1971 | | |
| 6th | November 18, 1972 | | |
| | 1973 – not presented, timing changed to have achievements of a calendar year honored early in following year | | |
| 7th | January 19, 1974 | | Hollywood Palladium |
| 8th | January 18, 1975 | | |
| 9th | February 7, 1976 | | |
| 10th | April 24, 1977 | | |
| 11th | June 9, 1978 | Deniece Williams/Adam Wade/Glynn Turman/Aretha Franklin/Don Mitchell/Judy Pace | Century Plaza Hotel |
| 12th | January 27, 1980 | Louis Gossett Jr./Rita Moreno/Ted Lange/Benjamin Hooks/Jack Valenti | Hollywood Palladium |
| 13th | December 7, 1980 | Robert Guillaume | Hollywood Palladium |
| 14th | December 6, 1981 | Robert Guillaume | Hollywood Palladium |
| 15th | December 5, 1982 | Robert Guillaume | Hollywood Palladium |
| 16th | December 4, 1983 | Jayne Kennedy/George Peppard/Michael Warren | Hollywood Palladium |
| 17th | December 1984 | | |
| 18th | December 1985 | | |
| 19th | December 14, 1986 | Debbie Allen/Denzel Washington | Wiltern Theatre |
| 20th | December 13, 1987 | Debbie Allen/Denzel Washington | Wiltern Theatre |
| 21st | December 1988 | | |
| 22nd | December 9, 1989 | | |
| 23rd | December 9, 1990 | | |
| | 1991 – not presented, timing changed to have achievements of a calendar year honored early in following year | | |
| 24th | January 11, 1992 | | Pasadena Civic Auditorium |
| 25th | January 16, 1993 | | Pasadena Civic Auditorium |
| 26th | January 5, 1994 | | Pasadena Civic Auditorium |
| | 1995 – canceled due to financial concerns | | |
| 27th | April 6, 1996 | Whitney Houston, Denzel Washington | Pasadena Civic Auditorium |
| 28th | February 8, 1997 | Arsenio Hall, Patti LaBelle | Pasadena Civic Auditorium |
| 29th | February 14, 1998 | Vanessa L. Williams, Gregory Hines | Pasadena Civic Auditorium |
| 30th | February 14, 1999 | Mariah Carey, Blair Underwood | Pasadena Civic Auditorium |
| 31st | February 12, 2000 | Diana Ross | Pasadena Civic Auditorium |
| 32nd | February 23, 2001 | Chris Tucker | Universal Amphitheatre |
| 33rd | March 3, 2002 | Chris Tucker | Universal Amphitheatre |
| 34th | March 8, 2003 | Cedric the Entertainer | Universal Amphitheatre |
| 35th | March 6, 2004 | Tracee Ellis Ross/Golden Brooks/Persia White/Jill Marie Jones | Universal Amphitheatre |
| 36th | March 19, 2005 | Chris Tucker | Dorothy Chandler Pavilion |
| 37th | February 26, 2006 | Cuba Gooding Jr. | Shrine Auditorium |
| 38th | March 2, 2007 | LL Cool J | Shrine Auditorium |
| 39th | February 14, 2008 | D. L. Hughley | Shrine Auditorium |
| 40th | February 12, 2009 | Halle Berry, Tyler Perry | Shrine Auditorium |
| 41st | February 26, 2010 | Anika Noni Rose, Hill Harper | Shrine Auditorium |
| 42nd | March 4, 2011 | Wayne Brady, Holly Robinson Peete | Shrine Auditorium |
| 43rd | February 17, 2012 | Sanaa Lathan, Anthony Mackie | Shrine Auditorium |
| 44th | February 1, 2013 | Steve Harvey | Shrine Auditorium |
| 45th | February 22, 2014 | Anthony Anderson | Pasadena Civic Auditorium |
| 46th | February 6, 2015 | Anthony Anderson | Pasadena Civic Auditorium |
| 47th | February 5, 2016 | Anthony Anderson | Pasadena Civic Auditorium |
| 48th | February 11, 2017 | Anthony Anderson | Pasadena Civic Auditorium |
| 49th | January 15, 2018 | Anthony Anderson | Pasadena Civic Auditorium |
| 50th | March 30, 2019 | Anthony Anderson | Dolby Theatre |
| 51st | February 22, 2020 | Anthony Anderson | Pasadena Civic Auditorium |
| 52nd | March 27, 2021 | Anthony Anderson | Virtual |
| 53rd | February 26, 2022 | Anthony Anderson | Virtual |
| 54th | February 25, 2023 | Queen Latifah | Pasadena Civic Auditorium |
| 55th | March 16, 2024 | Queen Latifah | Shrine Auditorium |
| 56th | February 22, 2025 | Deon Cole | Pasadena Civic Auditorium |
| 57th | February 28, 2026 | Deon Cole | Pasadena Civic Auditorium |

== Controversies ==
In 1987, the NAACP received criticism for not presenting their Best Actress award for that year. They defended this position, citing a lack of meaningful roles for Black women. In 1990, they were criticized once again for not awarding Best Actress. This was the fourth time it could not find enough nominees for Best Actress. Sandra Evers-Manly, president of the organization's Beverly Hills/Hollywood branch, said, "The [film] industry has yet to show diversity or present realistic leading roles for African-American women."

In several instances, nominees have been perceived as "undeserving" or "unworthy" of recognition by members of the media, fellow celebrities, as well as the general public; in their own defense, some NAACP representatives have stated that the overall quality of an artist's work is the salient issue. This would render certain factors, such as criminal charges or the nominee's history, being inconsequential in this regard. For example, in 1994, rapper Tupac Shakur was nominated for Outstanding Actor in a Motion Picture (for Poetic Justice), despite sexual assault charges being filed against him in December 1993. Furthermore, Shakur had been accused of felony counts of forcible sodomy and unlawful detainment in New York City; a woman alleged that he and two male accomplices held her captive, in a hotel room, and restricted her movements, holding her down as a fourth accomplice sodomized her. Shakur was also indicted for two counts of aggravated assault, in an unrelated incident, in which he supposedly shot and wounded two off-duty police officers. The same year, Martin Lawrence was criticized for winning Outstanding Actor in a Comedy Series and Outstanding Comedy Series for Martin, after Lawrence had been banned from Saturday Night Live due to sexual content in his opening monologue. In 2004, R. Kelly's Chocolate Factory was nominated for Outstanding Album while he was under indictment for charges related to child pornography.

Other nominees have faced controversy due to their portrayals of major civil rights figures. In 2003, the comedy film Barbershop received five nominations, including Outstanding Motion Picture and Outstanding Supporting Actor (for Cedric the Entertainer's performance); during the film, Cedric's character makes pejorative remarks about Rosa Parks, Martin Luther King Jr., Michael Jackson, and Jesse Jackson. This content caused criticism, including Parks' refusal to attend the ceremony. Hip-hop group Outkast received six nominations in 2004, and criticism soon followed, for both them and the NAACP, due to the name of one of their songs being "Rosa Parks". The song had resulted in Parks suing OutKast for defamation over use of her name.

== Award categories ==
=== Motion picture ===
- Outstanding Motion Picture
- Outstanding Documentary
- Outstanding Actress in a Motion Picture
- Outstanding Actor in a Motion Picture
- Outstanding Supporting Actress in a Motion Picture
- Outstanding Supporting Actor in a Motion Picture
- Outstanding International Motion Picture
- Outstanding Independent Motion Picture
- Outstanding Directing in a Motion Picture
- Outstanding Writing in a Motion Picture
- NAACP Image Award for Outstanding Youth Performance in a Motion Picture
- Outstanding Character Voice Performance – Motion Picture
- Outstanding Short-Form (Animated)

=== Music ===
- Outstanding New Artist
- Outstanding Female Artist
- Outstanding Male Artist
- Outstanding Duo or Group
- Outstanding Jazz Artist
- Outstanding Jazz Album
- Outstanding Jazz Vocal Album
- Outstanding Gospel Artist
- Outstanding Gospel Album (Traditional or Contemporary)
- Outstanding Music Video
- Outstanding Song (Traditional and Contemporary)
- Outstanding Album

=== Literature ===
- Outstanding Literary Work – Fiction
- Outstanding Literary Work – Nonfiction
- Outstanding Literary Work – Biography/Autobiography
- Outstanding Literary Work – Debut Author
- Outstanding Literary Work – Poetry
- Outstanding Literary Work – Instructional
- Outstanding Literary Work – Children
- Outstanding Literary Work – Youth/Teens

=== Podcast ===
- Outstanding News and Information Podcast
- Outstanding Lifestyle/Self-Help Podcast
- Outstanding Society and Culture Podcast
- Outstanding Literary Work – Debut Author
- Outstanding Arts, Sports, and Entertainment Podcast

=== Television ===
- Outstanding Drama Series
- Outstanding Actress in a Drama Series
- Outstanding Actor in a Drama Series
- Outstanding Supporting Actress in a Drama Series
- Outstanding Supporting Actor in a Drama Series
- Outstanding Directing in a Drama Series
- Outstanding Writing in a Drama Series
- Outstanding Children's Program
- Outstanding Comedy Series
- Outstanding Actress in a Comedy Series
- Outstanding Actor in a Comedy Series
- Outstanding Supporting Actress in a Comedy Series
- Outstanding Supporting Actor in a Comedy Series
- Outstanding Actress in a Daytime Drama Series
- Outstanding Actor in a Daytime Drama Series
- Outstanding Television Movie, Mini-Series or Dramatic Special
- Outstanding Actress in a Television Movie, Mini-Series or Dramatic Special
- Outstanding Actor in a Television Movie, Mini-Series or Dramatic Special
- Outstanding Performance by a Youth (Series, Special, Television Movie or Limited-series)
- Outstanding News/Information – Series or Special
- Outstanding Talk Series
- Outstanding Variety – Series or Special
- Outstanding Character Voice-Over Performance (Television)
- Outstanding Stunt Ensemble (Television or Film)

=== Special awards ===
- Vanguard Award
- Chairman's Award
- President's Award
- Hall of Fame Award
- Entertainer of the Year
- Activist of the Year
- Social Media Personality of the Year
- Key of Life Award
