= Whitewash: The Clarence Brandley Story =

2002 film directed by Tony Bill

- Based on: White Lies by Nick Davies
- Written by: Abby Mann
- Directed by: Tony Bill
- Starring: Courtney B. Vance; Eamonn Walker; Gil Bellows
- Country of origin: United States
- Original language: English

Production
- Running time: 108 minutes

Original release
- Release: April 21, 2002

Whitewash: The Clarence Brandley Story is a 2002 biographical film directed by Tony Bill and starring Courtney B. Vance. It tells the true story of Clarence Brandley, who was wrongly convicted for the rape and murder of Cheryl Dee Fergeson in 1981.

The film was nominated for an NAACP Image Award for Outstanding Television Movie, Mini-Series or Dramatic Special, but it lost to The Rosa Parks Story.
