= Kinyarwanda (film) =

- Written by: Alrick Brown; Ishmael Ntithabose
- Release date: 2011
- Running time: 100 minutes

Kinyarwanda is a 2011 film based on the Rwandan genocide.

== Film ==
Based on true accounts, the film consists of six interwoven tales of several events happening as the genocide takes place. Mosques become a place of refuge, and the taboo of interethnic marriage between a Hutu and a Tutsi is also depicted.

== Reception ==
Variety described the movie as "doubly disappointing", while the African American Literature Book Club described it as a "brilliant directorial debut".

== Awards ==
- 2011, Sundance Film Festival: World Cinema Audience Award (Dramatic)
- 2011, AFI FEST Best International Feature Film (Audience Award)
- 2011, AFI FEST Audience Award (World Cinema)
