= NAACP Image Award for Entertainer of the Year =

Award from the NAACP

The NAACP Image Award winners for Entertainer of the Year. Entertainer of the Year is the final award presented at the ceremony.

Year	Winner	Reference
1986	Dionne Warwick	
1987	Patti LaBelle	
1988	Dionne Warwick (2)	
1989	Lionel Richie	
1990	Eddie Murphy	
1991	Oprah Winfrey	
1992	Patti LaBelle (2)	
1993	Michael Jackson	
1994	Whitney Houston	
1995	Whitney Houston (2)	
1996	Quincy Jones	
1997	Denzel Washington	
1998	Kenneth "Babyface" Edmonds	
1999	Will Smith	
2000	Halle Berry	
2001	Steve Harvey	
2004	Beyoncé	
2013	Jamie Foxx	
2014	Kevin Hart	
2015	Taraji P. Henson	
2016	Michael B. Jordan	
2017	Dwayne Johnson	
2018	Ava DuVernay	
2019	Beyoncé (2)	
2020	Lizzo	
2021	D-Nice	
2022	Jennifer Hudson	
2023	Angela Bassett	
2024	Usher	
2025	Keke Palmer	
2026	Michael B. Jordan (2)	

== Multiple wins ==
Patti LaBelle, Beyoncé, Michael B. Jordan, Dionne Warwick, and Whitney Houston are the only five people to win the award twice.
