= NAACP Image Award – President's Award =

Annual award given by the NAACP president

The National Association for the Advancement of Colored People presents an annual NAACP Image Award. Winners are selected by the NAACP president in recognition of special achievement and distinguished public service. The following are winners for the President's Award:

Year	Winner
1987	Ella Fitzgerald
1988	Rev. Jesse Jackson
1989	Jheryl Busby
1990	Antoinette Stroman & Ryan White
1996	Kent Amos & Carmen Amos
1997	Bryant Gumbel
1998	Alexis Herman
1999	Lauryn Hill
2000	Tavis Smiley and Tom Joyner
2001	Bill Clinton
2002	Condoleezza Rice
2003	Venus and Serena Williams
2004	T. D. Jakes
2006	Susan L. Taylor
2007	Soledad O'Brien
2008	Donald Sterling
2009	Muhammad Ali
2010	Van Jones
2011	Colin Powell
2012	The Black Stuntmen's Association
2013	Kerry Washington
2015	Spike Lee
2016	John Legend
2017	Lonnie Bunch
2018	Danny Glover
2019	Shawn "Jay-Z" Carter
2020	Rihanna
2021	LeBron James
2022	Prince Harry, Duke of Sussex & Meghan, Duchess of Sussex
2023	Gabrielle Union & Dwyane Wade
2024	Usher
2025	Dave Chappelle
2026	Colman Domingo
