= NAACP Image Award – Chairman's Award =

Award from the NAACP

The NAACP Image Award winners for the Chairman's Award:

| Year | Winner | Ref |
|---|---|---|
| 1992 | Janet Jackson | |
| 1993 | Ron Brown | |
| 1997 | Maxine Waters and Joseph Madison | |
| 1999 | Harry Belafonte | |
| 2002 | Aaron McGruder | |
| 2003 | Danny Glover | |
| 2004 | The Dave Matthews Band | |
| 2005 | Barack Obama | |
| 2006 | The Neville Brothers | |
| 2007 | Bono | |
| 2008 | Ruby Dee | |
| 2009 | Al Gore & Wangari Maathai | |
| 2010 | Tyler Perry | |
| 2012 | Cathy Hughes | |
| 2013 | Michelle J. Howard | |
| 2014 | Forest Whitaker | |
| 2015 | Eric Holder | |
| 2016 | Brittany "Bree" Newsome; Justice League NYC; Concerned Student 1950 Collective at the University of Missouri; The University of Mississippi NAACP College Chapter; Rev. Dr. Otis Moss III; Rev. Dr. Howard-John Wesley; Rev. Dr. Jamal Harrison Bryant; Jussie Smollett | |
| 2017 | Charles Ogletree | |
| 2018 | William Lucy | |
| 2019 | Maxine Waters | |
| 2020 | John Lewis | |
| 2021 | Rev. James Lawson | |
| 2022 | Samuel L. Jackson | |
| 2023 | Bennie Thompson | |
| 2024 | Amanda Gorman | |
| 2025 | Kamala Harris | |
| 2026 | Viola Davis | |
