= 44th NAACP Image Awards =

American entertainment awards for 2012 works

- Date: February 1, 2013
- Location: Shrine Auditorium, Los Angeles, California
- Presented by: National Association for the Advancement of Colored People
- Hosted by: Steve Harvey

Television/radio coverage
- Network: NBC

The 44th NAACP Image Awards ceremony, presented by the National Association for the Advancement of Colored People (NAACP), honored the best in film, television, recording, and literature of 2012. The ceremony took place on February 1, 2013, at the Shrine Auditorium in Los Angeles, California, aired live on NBC and was hosted by Steve Harvey.

U.S. Admiral Michelle Howard was received the Chairman's Award. American actress Kerry Washington was honored with the President's Award for being a "modern trailblazer". Harry Belafonte was recognized with the Spingarn Medal while Jamie Foxx won the Entertainer of the Year.

All nominees are listed below with the winners listed in bold.

== Motion picture ==
=== Motion Picture ===
- Beasts of the Southern Wild (Fox Searchlight Pictures)
- Django Unchained (The Weinstein Company)
- Flight (Paramount Pictures)
- **Red Tails** (Lucasfilm)
- Tyler Perry's Good Deeds (Lionsgate)

=== Actor in a Motion Picture ===
- **Denzel Washington - Flight** (Paramount Pictures)
- Jamie Foxx - Django Unchained (The Weinstein Company)
- Morgan Freeman - The Magic of Belle Isle (Magnolia Pictures)
- Suraj Sharma- Life of Pi (20th Century Fox)
- Tyler Perry - Alex Cross (Summit Entertainment)

=== Actress in a Motion Picture ===
- Emayatzy Corinealdi - Middle of Nowhere (AAFRM)
- Halle Berry - Cloud Atlas (Warner Bros. Pictures)
- Loretta Devine - In The Hive (Eone Entertainment)
- Quvenzhané Wallis - Beasts of the Southern Wild (Fox Searchlight Pictures)
- **Viola Davis - Won't Back Down** (20th Century Fox)

=== Supporting Actor in a Motion Picture ===
- David Oyelowo - Middle of Nowhere (AFFRM)
- Don Cheadle - Flight (Paramount Pictures)
- Dwight Henry - Beasts of the Southern Wild (Fox Searchlight Pictures)
- Lenny Kravitz - The Hunger Games (Lionsgate)
- **Samuel L. Jackson - Django Unchained** (The Weinstein Company)

=== Supporting Actress in a Motion Picture ===
- Amandla Stenberg - The Hunger Games (Lionsgate)
- Gloria Reuben - Lincoln (The Walt Disney Studios)
- **Kerry Washington - Django Unchained** (The Weinstein Company)
- Phylicia Rashad - Tyler Perry's Good Deeds (Lionsgate)
- Taraji P. Henson - Think Like a Man (Screen Gems)

=== Independent Motion Picture ===
- **Beasts of the Southern Wild** (Fox Searchlight Pictures)
- Chico & Rita (GKIDS)
- Red Tails (Lucasfilm)
- Unconditional (Harbinger Media Partners)
- Woman Thou Art Loosed: On the 7th Day (Codeblack)

=== International Motion Picture ===
- Chico & Rita (GKIDS)
- For Greater Glory: The True Story of Cristiada (ARC Entertainment)
- Special Forces (eOne Films)
- **The Intouchables** (The Weinstein Company)
- The Raid: Redemption (Sony Pictures Classics)

== Documentary ==
=== Documentary - (Theatrical or Television) ===
- Black Wings (Smithsonian Channel)
- Brooklyn Castle (Producers Distribution Agency)
- First Position (IFC Films)
- Marley (Magnolia Pictures)
- **On the Shoulders of Giants - The Story of the Greatest Team You've Never Heard Of** (Showtime)

== Television ==
=== Comedy Series ===
- Glee (Fox)
- **Modern Family** (ABC)
- The Game (BET)
- The Mindy Project (Fox)
- The Soul Man (TV Land)

=== Actor in a Comedy Series ===
- Anthony Anderson - Guys with Kids (NBC)
- Damon Wayans, Jr. - Happy Endings (ABC)
- **Don Cheadle** - House Of Lies (Showtime)
- Donald Faison - The Exes (TV Land)
- Hosea Chanchez - The Game (BET)

=== Actress in a Comedy Series ===
- Amber Riley - Glee (Fox)
- Cassi Davis - Tyler Perry's House of Payne (TBS)
- Kellita Smith - The First Family (Syndicated)
- Tatyana Ali - Love That Girl (TV One)
- **Wendy Raquel Robinson** - The Game (BET)

=== Supporting Actor in a Comedy Series ===
- Aziz Ansari - Parks and Recreation (NBC)
- Craig Robinson - The Office (NBC)
- Donald Glover - Community (NBC)
- **Lance Gross** - Tyler Perry's House of Payne (TBS)
- Tracy Morgan - 30 Rock (NBC)

=== Supporting Actress in a Comedy Series ===
- Anna Deavere Smith - Nurse Jackie (Showtime)
- Gabourey Sidibe - The Big C (Showtime)
- **Gladys Knight** - The First Family (Syndicated)
- Rashida Jones - Parks and Recreation (NBC)
- Vanessa Williams - Desperate Housewives (ABC)

=== Drama Series ===
- Boardwalk Empire (HBO)
- Grey's Anatomy (ABC)
- Scandal (ABC)
- Treme (HBO)
- True Blood (HBO)

=== Actor in a Drama Series ===
- Dulé Hill - Psych (USA)
- Hill Harper - CSI: NY (CBS)
- LL Cool J - NCIS: Los Angeles (CBS)
- Michael Clarke Duncan - The Finder (FOX)
- Wendell Pierce - Treme (HBO)

=== Actress in a Drama Series ===
- Chandra Wilson - Grey's Anatomy (ABC)
- **Kerry Washington** - Scandal (ABC)
- Khandi Alexander - Treme (HBO)
- Regina King - SouthLAnd (TNT)
- Sandra Oh - Grey's Anatomy (ABC)

=== Supporting Actor in a Drama Series ===
- Clarke Peters - Treme (HBO)
- Dev Patel - The Newsroom (HBO)
- Omar Epps - House M.D. (FOX)
- Rockmond Dunbar - Sons of Anarchy (FX)
- Rocky Carroll - NCIS (CBS)

=== Supporting Actress in a Drama Series ===
- Archie Panjabi - The Good Wife (CBS)
- Joy Bryant - Parenthood (NBC)
- Loretta Devine - Grey's Anatomy (ABC)
- Lucy Liu - SouthLAnd (TNT)
- Rutina Wesley - True Blood (HBO)

=== Television Movie, Mini-Series or Dramatic Special ===
- Abducted: The Carlina White Story (Lifetime)
- Hallmark Hall of Fame's FIRELIGHT (ABC)
- Raising Izzie (GMC TV)'
- Steel Magnolias (Lifetime)
- Sugar Mommas (GMC TV)

=== Actor in a Television Movie, Mini-Series or Dramatic Special ===
- Afemo Omilami - Steel Magnolias (Lifetime)
- Cuba Gooding, Jr. - Hallmark Hall of Fame's FIRELIGHT (ABC)
- Michael Jai White - Somebody's C' (GMC TV)
- Rockmond Dunbar - Raising Izzie (GMC TV)
- Tory Kittles - Steel Magnolias (Lifetime)

=== Actress in a Television Movie, Mini-Series or Dramatic Special ===
- Alfre Woodard - Steel Magnolias (Lifetime)
- Jill Scott - Steel Magnolias (Lifetime)
- Keke Palmer - Abducted: The Carlina White Story (Lifetime)
- Phylicia Rashad - Steel Magnolias (Lifetime)
- Queen Latifah - Steel Magnolias (Lifetime)

=== Actor in a Daytime Drama Series ===
- Aaron D. Spears - The Bold and the Beautiful (CBS)
- Erik Valdez - General Hospital (ABC)
- James Reynolds - Days of Our Lives (NBC)
- Kristoff St. John - The Young and the Restless (CBS)
- Rodney Saulsberry - The Bold and the Beautiful (CBS)

=== Actress in a Daytime Drama Series ===
- Angell Conwell - The Young and the Restless (CBS)
- Julia Pace Mitchell - The Young and the Restless (CBS)
- Kristolyn Lloyd - The Bold and the Beautiful (CBS)
- Shenell Edmonds - One Life to Live (ABC)
- Tatyana Ali - The Young and the Restless (CBS)

=== News/ Information - (Series or Special) ===
- Ask Obama Live: An MTV Interview with The President (MTV)
- Judge Mathis (Syndicated)
- Save My Son with Dr. Steve Perry (TV One)
- Unsung (TV One)
- Washington Watch with Roland Martin (TV One)

=== Talk Series ===
- Don't Sleep! (BET)
- Oprah's Lifeclass (OWN)
- Oprah's Next Chapter (OWN)
- The View (ABC)
- Totally Biased with W. Kamau Bell (FX)

=== Reality Series ===
- Dancing with the Stars (ABC)
- Real Sports with Bryant Gumbel (HBO)
- The X Factor (FOX)
- Tia & Tamera (Style)
- Welcome to Sweetie Pie's (OWN)

=== Variety Series or Special ===
- Black Girls Rock (BET)
- Oprah and the Legendary Cast of Roots 35 Years Later (OWN)
- Oprah's Master Class (OWN)
- The First Graduating Class: Oprah Winfrey Leadership Academy for Girls (OWN)
- Verses & Flow (TV One)

=== Children’s Program ===
- Degrassi (TeenNick)
- Kasha and the Zulu King (BET)
- The Legend of Korra (Nickelodeon)
- Big Time Movie (TeenNick)
- The Weight of the Nation for Kids (HBO)

=== Performance in a Youth/ Children’s Program - (Series or Special) ===
- China Anne McClain - A.N.T. Farm (Disney Channel)
- Keke Palmer - Winx Club (Nickelodeon)
- Loretta Devine - Doc McStuffins (Disney Junior)
- Nick Cannon - The HALO

== Screenwriting ==
=== Writing in a Comedy Series ===
- Karin Gist - House of Lies - Mini-Mogul (Showtime)
- Marc Wilmore - The Simpsons - The Spy Who Learned Me (FOX)
- Michael Shipley - Last Man Standing - High Expectations (ABC)
- Prentice Penny - Happy Endings - Meet the Parrots (ABC)
- Vali Chandrasekaran, Robert Carlock - 30 Rock - Murphy Brown Lied to Us (NBC)

=== Writing in a Dramatic Series ===
- Cheo Hodari Coker - SouthLAnd - God's Work (TNT)
- Janine Sherman Barrios - Criminal Minds - The Pact (CBS)
- Shonda Rhimes - Grey's Anatomy - Flight (ABC)
- Shonda Rhimes - Scandal - Sweet Baby (ABC)
- Zoanne Clack - Grey's Anatomy - This Magic Moment (ABC)

=== Writing in a Motion Picture - (Theatrical or Television) ===
- Elizabeth Hunter - Abducted: The Carlina White Story (Lifetime)
- John Gatins - Flight (Paramount Pictures)
- John Ridley, Aaron McGruder - Red Tails (Lucasfilm)
- Keith Merryman, David A. Newman - Think Like a Man (Screen Gems)
- Ol Parker - The Best Exotic Marigold Hotel (Fox Searchlight Pictures)

== Recording ==
=== New Artist ===
- **Elle Varner** (MBK / RCA)
- Gary Clark, Jr. (Warner Bros. Records)
- Lianne La Havas (Nonesuch Records Inc. / Warner Bros. Records)
- Melanie Amaro (Epic Records)
- The OMG Girlz (Pretty Hustle / Grand Hustle / Streamline / Interscope)

=== Male Artist ===
- Bruno Mars (Atlantic)
- Lupe Fiasco (Atlantic)
- Miguel (ByStorm / RCA)
- Trey Songz (Atlantic)
- **Usher** (RCA Records)

=== Female Artist ===
- **Alicia Keys** (RCA Records)
- Elle Varner (MBK / RCA)
- Estelle (Atlantic)
- Missy Elliott (Atlantic)
- Tamela Mann (Tillymann Music Group)

=== Duo, Group or Collaboration ===
- Chuck D, Johnny Juice, Will.i.am, Herbie Hancock (Iconomy Multi-Media & Entertainment)
- fun. feat. Janelle Monáe (Atlantic)
- Lupe Fiasco feat. Guy Sebastian (Atlantic)
- **Mary Mary** (Columbia)
- Ne-Yo, Herbie Hancock, Johnny Rzeznik, Delta Rae, Natasha Bedingfield (Forward Song, LLC)

=== Jazz Album ===
- Bone Appetit [Vol. 1 and 2] - Jeff Bradshaw (Hidden Beach)
- Dreams - Brian Culbertson (Verve Records)
- Renaissance - Marcus Miller (Concord Jazz)
- Seeds From The Underground - Kenny Garrett (Mack Avenue Records)
- **The Preservation Hall 50th Anniversary Collection - The Preservation Hall Jazz Band** (Legacy)

=== Gospel Album - (Traditional or Contemporary) ===
- Best Days - Tamela Mann (Tillymann Music Group)
- **Go Get It - Mary Mary** (Columbia)
- God, Love & Romance - Fred Hammond (Verity Gospel Music Group)
- I Win - Marvin Sapp (Verity Gospel Music Group)
- Le'Andria Johnson The Experience - Le'Andria Johnson (Music World Gospel / Music World)

=== World Music Album ===
- Ayah Ye! Moving Train - KG Omulo (KG Omulo)
- Country, God, Or The Girl - K'NAAN (A&M / Octone Records)
- Diversionary - Brother B (King Chero Records)
- **All of Me - Estelle** (Atlantic)

=== Music video ===
- Adorn - Miguel (ByStorm / RCA)
- **Girl On Fire - Alicia Keys** (RCA Records)
- Locked Out Of Heaven - Bruno Mars (Atlantic)
- This Christmas - CeeLo Green (Elektra)
- You're On My Mind - KEM (Universal Motown)

=== Song ===
- "Be Mine for Christmas" - KEM (Universal Motown)
- "Glorify the King" - KEM (Universal Motown)
- **"I Look To You" - Whitney Houston and R. Kelly** (RCA Records)
- "Locked Out Of Heaven" - Bruno Mars (Atlantic)
- "You're On My Mind" - KEM (Universal Motown)

=== Album ===
- Bad - 25th Anniversary Deluxe Edition - Michael Jackson (Legacy / Epic)
- Girl On Fire - Alicia Keys (RCA Records)
- **I Will Always Love You: The Best Of Whitney Houston - Whitney Houston** (RCA Records)
- On the Shoulders of Giants - The Soundtrack - Chuck D, Will.i.am, Herbie Hancock, Nikki Yannofsky (Iconomy Multi-Media & Entertainment )
- Perfectly Imperfect - Elle Varner (MBK / RCA)

== Literature ==
=== Literary Work - Fiction ===
- A Wish and a Prayer: A Blessings Novel - Beverly Jenkins (HarperCollins Publishers (William Morrow Paperbacks))
- Destiny's Divas - Victoria Christopher Murray (Touchstone / Simon & Schuster)
- Silent Cry - Dywane Birch (Strebor Books)
- **The Reverend's Wife - Kimberla Lawson Roby** (Grand Central's Wife)
- The Secret She Kept - ReShonda Tate Billingsley (Gallery Books, a division of Simon & Schuster)

=== Literary Work - Non-Fiction ===
- Fraternity - Diane Brady (Spiegel & Grau (Random House))
- Guest of Honor: Booker T. Washington, Theodore Roosevelt, and the White House Dinner That Shocked a Nation - Deborah Davis (Atria Books / Simon & Schuster)
- Power Concedes Nothing: One Woman's Quest for Social Justice in America, from the Courtroom to the Kill Zones - Connie Rice (Scribner)
- The Courage to Hope - Shirley Sherrod (Atria Books)
- **The Oath: The Obama White House and the Supreme Court - Jeffrey Toobin** (Doubleday)

=== Literary Work - Debut Author ===
- A Cupboard Full of Coats - Yvvette Edwards (HarperCollins Publishers (Amistad))
- Antebellum - R. Kayeen Thomas (Strebor Books)
- Congo: Spirit of Darkness - Mayi Ngwala (Genet Press)
- **Nikki G: A Portrait of Nikki Giovanni in Her Own Words - Darryl L. Lacy** (Darryl L. Lacy (iUniverse))
- The Sister Accord: 51 Ways To Love Your Sister - Sonia Jackson Myles (The Sister Accord, LLC)

=== Literary Work - Biography/ Auto-Biography ===
- **Across That Bridge: Life Lessons and a Vision for Change - John Lewis** (Hyperion)
- Interventions: A Life in War and Peace - Kofi Annan (The Penguin Press)
- The Black Count: Glory, Revolution, Betrayal, and the Real Count of Monte Cristo - Tom Reiss (Crown Publishers)
- The Good Food Revolution: Growing Healthy Food, People, and Communities – Will Allen (Gotham Books)
- The One: The Life and Music of James Brown - RJ Smith (Gotham Books)

=== Literary Work - Instructional ===
- 12 Ways to Put Money in Your Pocket Every Month Without A Part Time Job; The Skinny Book That Makes Your Wallet Fat - Jennifer Matthews (Pickett Fennell Publishing Group)
- Formula 50: A 6-Week Workout and Nutrition Plan That Will Transform Your Life – 50 Cent (Avery (Penguin Group))
- **Health First: The Black Woman's Wellness Guide - Eleanor Hinton Hoytt, Hilary Beard** (SmileyBooks)
- It's Complicated (But It Doesn't Have to Be): A Modern Guide to Finding and Keeping Love - Paul Carrick Brunson (Gotham Books)
- The No Excuse Guide to Success: No Matter What Your Boss or Life Throws at You - Jim Smith, Jr. (Career Press)

=== Literary Work - Poetry ===
- Hurrah's Nest - Arisa White (Virtual Artists Collective)
- Maybe the Saddest Thing - Marcus Wicker (HarperCollins Publishers (Harper Perennial))
- **Speak Water - Truth Thomas** (Cherry Castle Publishing)
- The Ground - Rowan Ricardo Phillips (Farrar, Straus and Giroux)
- Thrall - Natasha Trethewey (Houghton Mifflin Harcourt)

=== Literary Work - Children ===
- Fifty Cents and a Dream - Jabari Asim (Author), Bryan Collier (Illustrator) (Little, Brown Books for Young Readers)
- Harlem's Little Blackbird - Renee Watson (Author), Christian Robinson (Illustrator) (Random House Books for Young Readers (Random House Children's Books))
- In the Land of Milk and Honey - Joyce Carol Thomas (Author), Floyd Cooper (Illustrator) (HarperCollins / Amistad)
- Indigo Blume and the Garden City - Kwame Alexander (Word of Mouth Books)
- **What Color is My World? - Kareem Abdul-Jabbar (Author), Raymons Obstfeld (Author), A.G. Ford (Illustrator)** (Candlewick Press)

=== Literary Work - Youth/Teens ===
- Fire in the Streets - Kekla Magoon (Simon & Schuster Children's Publishing)
- **Obama Talks Back: Global Lessons - A Dialogue With America's Young Leaders - Gregory Reed** (Amber Books)
- Pinned - Sharon G. Flake (Scholastic Press)
- The Diary of B. B. Bright, Possible Princess - Alice Randall (Author), Caroline Williams (Author), Shadra Strickland (Illustrator) (Turner Publishing Company)
- The Mighty Miss Malone - Christopher Paul Curtis (Wendy Lamb Books (Random House Children's Books))
