= 26th NAACP Image Awards =

American entertainment awards for 1993 works

The 26th NAACP Image Awards ceremony, presented by the National Association for the Advancement of Colored People (NAACP), honored the best in film, television, music of 1993 and took place on January 5, 1994, at the Pasadena Civic Auditorium. It was the 8th year that the event was taped and recorded on NBC.

== List of awards and nominees ==
=== Entertainer of the Year ===
- Whitney Houston

=== Outstanding Motion Picture ===
- Malcolm X

=== Lead Actor in a Motion Picture ===
- Denzel Washington, Malcolm X

=== Lead Actress in a Motion Picture ===
- Angela Bassett, What's Love Got to Do With It

=== Supporting Actor in a Motion Picture ===
- Al Freeman Jr., Malcolm X

=== Supporting Actress in a Motion Picture ===
- Angela Bassett, Malcolm X

=== Youth Actor or Actress ===
- Jaleel White, Family Matters

=== Comedy Series ===
- Martin

=== Actor in a Comedy Series ===
- Martin Lawrence, Martin

=== Actress in a Comedy Series ===
- Jasmine Guy, A Different World

=== Drama Series ===
- I'll Fly Away

=== Actor in a Drama Series ===
- Blair Underwood, L.A. Law

=== Actress in a Drama Series ===
- Regina Taylor, I'll Fly Away

=== Television Movie or Miniseries ===
- Alex Haley's Queen

=== Actor in a Television Movie or Miniseries ===
- Danny Glover, Alex Haley's Queen

=== Actress in a Television Movie or Miniseries ===
- Halle Berry, Alex Haley's Queen

=== Daytime Drama Series ===
- The Young and the Restless

=== Actor in a Daytime Drama Series ===
- Kristoff St. John, The Young and the Restless

=== Actress in a Daytime Drama Series ===
- Victoria Rowell, The Young and the Restless

=== Variety Series ===
- The Arsenio Hall Show

=== Performance in a Variety Series ===
- Arsenio Hall, The Arsenio Hall Show

=== Variety Special ===
- Sinbad Live From New York: Afros & Bellbottoms

=== Performance in a Variety Special ===
- Patti LaBelle, The 1993 Essence Awards

=== News, Talk or Information Series or Special ===
- The Oprah Winfrey Show

=== Outstanding Children's Program ===
- Family Matters
- Hangin' with Mr. Cooper
- Saved by the Bell: The College Years
- Thea

=== Outstanding Performance in a Youth or Children's Series or Special ===
- Jaleel White - Family Matters
- Jodie Resther - Are You Afraid of the Dark?
- Cree Summer - Rugrats
- Kevin Clash - Sesame Street

=== New Artist ===
- Shai, "If I Ever Fall in Love."

=== Male Artist ===
- Luther Vandross, "Never Let Me Go."

=== Female Artist ===
- Whitney Houston, The Bodyguard soundtrack.

=== Duo or Group ===
- En Vogue, "Runaway Love."

=== Gospel Artist ===
- The Winans, "All Out."

=== Jazz Artist ===
- Kenny G, "Breathless."

=== Rap Artist ===
- Jazzy Jeff & the Fresh Prince, "Boom! Shake the Room."

=== World Music Artist ===
- B. B. King, "Blues Summit."

=== Soundtrack Album (Film or Television) ===
- The Bodyguard, various artists, featuring Whitney Houston.

=== Album ===
- The Bodyguard soundtrack, various artists, featuring Whitney Houston.

=== Music video ===
- "I'm Every Woman," Whitney Houston.

=== Choreography in Film or Television ===
- Debbie Allen, The 65th Annual Academy Awards

=== Literary Work, Fiction ===
- Your Blues Ain't Like Mine, by Bebe Moore Campbell.

=== Literary Work, Nonfiction ===
- "By Any Means Necessary: The Trials and Tribulations of the Making of Malcolm X," by Spike Lee with Ralph Wiley.

=== Literary Work, Children's ===
- "Sojourner Truth: "Ain't I a Woman?," by Patricia C. McKissack and Frederick McKissack.
