= 25th NAACP Image Awards =

American entertainment awards for 1992 works

- Date: January 16, 1993
- Site: Pasadena Civic Auditorium, Pasadena, California

Television coverage
- Network: NBC

The 25th NAACP Image Awards ceremony, presented by the National Association for the Advancement of Colored People (NAACP), honored the best in film, television, music of 1992 and took place on January 16, 1993 at the Pasadena Civic Auditorium. It was the 7th year that the event was pre-recorded and televised on NBC.

== Awards and nominees ==
=== Outstanding Lead Actor in a Motion Picture ===
- New Jack City: Wesley Snipes

=== Outstanding Lead Actor in a Comedy Series ===
- The Cosby Show: Bill Cosby

=== Outstanding Lead Actress in a Comedy Series ===
- A Different World: Jasmine Guy

=== Outstanding Lead Actress in a Motion Picture ===
- The Long Walk Home: Whoopi Goldberg

=== Outstanding Comedy Series ===
- Martin

=== Outstanding Children's Program ===
- Family Matters
- Rugrats
- The Royal Family (TV series)
- Saved by the Bell

=== Outstanding News, Talk or Information ===
- The Oprah Winfrey Show

=== Outstanding Motion Picture ===
- Boyz n the Hood

=== Outstanding Variety Series ===
- In Living Color

=== Outstanding Variety Special ===
- Great Performances: Natalie Cole - Unforgettable With Love

=== Outstanding Performance in a Youth/Children's Program (Series or Special) ===
- Jaleel White: Family Matters
- Kevin Clash: Dinosaurs (TV series)
- Venus DeMilo Thomas: Salute Your Shorts
- Mario Lopez: Saved by the Bell

=== Outstanding Lead Actor in a Drama Series, Mini-Series or Television Movie ===
- Gabriel's Fire: James Earl Jones
- The Jacksons: An American Dream: Lawrence Hilton-Jacobs

=== Outstanding Lead Actress in a Drama Series, Mini-Series or Television Movie ===
- The Josephine Baker Story: Lynn Whitfield

=== Outstanding Drama Series, Mini-Series or Television Movie ===
- In the Heat of the Night

=== Best Music Video ===
- Michael Jackson - "Black or White"

=== Entertainer of the Year Award ===
- Michael Jackson
