= 40th NAACP Image Awards =

American entertainment awards for 2008 works

- Date: February 12, 2009
- Site: Shrine Auditorium, Los Angeles, California
- Hosted by: Halle Berry & Tyler Perry
- Official website: NAACPImageAwards.net

Television coverage
- Network: Fox

The 40th NAACP Image Awards ceremony, presented by the National Association for the Advancement of Colored People (NAACP), honored the best in film, television, music of 2008 and took place on February 12, 2009 at the Shrine Auditorium. The show was televised live on Fox and hosted by Halle Berry and Tyler Perry.

This event celebrated the 100th anniversary of the NAACP.

== Motion Picture ==
=== Outstanding Motion Picture ===
- The Secret Life of Bees
- Cadillac Records
- The Family That Preys
- Miracle at St. Anna
- Seven Pounds

=== Outstanding Actor in a Motion Picture ===
- Will Smith - Seven Pounds
- Rob Brown-The Express: The Ernie Davis Story
- Don Cheadle- Traitor
- Outstanding Actress: Rosario Dawson - Seven Pounds
- Outstanding Supporting Actor: Columbus Short - Cadillac Records
- Outstanding Supporting Actress: Taraji P. Henson - The Curious Case of Benjamin Button
- Outstanding Independent or Foreign Film: Slumdog Millionaire
- Outstanding Documentary:Good Hair

=== Music awards ===
- Outstanding Album: Jennifer Hudson - Jennifer Hudson
- Outstanding Male Artist: Jamie Foxx
- Outstanding Female Artist: Beyoncé
- Outstanding New Artist: Jennifer Hudson
- Outstanding Duo, Group, or Collaboration: Jennifer Hudson and Fantasia Barrino
- Outstanding Song: Yes We Can by will.i.am
