= NAACP Image Award for Outstanding Literary Work – Instructional =

Instructional monograph award from the NAACP

This article lists the winners and nominees for the NAACP Image Award for Outstanding Literary Work, Instructional. The award has been given out since 2007 and since its conception, T. D. Jakes and Daymond John hold the record for most wins in this category with two each.

== Winners and nominees ==
=== 2000s ===
Award winners and finalists
Year	Book	Author	Result	Ref.
2007	Mama Made the Difference	T. D. Jakes	Winner	
2007	The Mocha Manual to a Fabulous Pregnancy	Kimberly Allers	Finalist	
2007	Shine: A Physical, Emotional, and Spiritual Journey to Finding Love	Star Jones Reynolds	Finalist	
2007	Skinny Cooks Can't Be Trusted	Mo'Nique	Finalist	
2007	Southern Homecoming Traditions: Recipes and Remembrances	Carolyn Quick Tillery	Finalist	
2008	The Covenant in Action	Tavis Smiley	Winner	
2008	Do You!: 12 Laws to Access the Power in You to Achieve Happiness and Success	Russell Simmons	Finalist	
2008	Guide to Having Everything You Ever Dreamed of and More	Amy DuBois Barnett	Finalist	
2008	Reposition Yourself: Living Life Without Limits	T. D. Jakes	Finalist	
2008	This Year You Write Your Novel	Walter Mosley	Finalist	
2009	—N/a			

=== 2010s ===
Award winners and finalists
Year	Book	Author	Result	Ref.
2010	Act Like a Lady, Think Like a Man	Steve Harvey	Winner	
2010	Down to Business: The First 10 Steps to Entrepreneurship for Women	Clara Villarosa	Finalist	
2010	Start Where You Are: Life Lessons in Getting from Where You Are to Where You Want to Be	Chris Gardner	Finalist	
2010	Your Money or Your Life	Alvin Hall	Finalist	
2010	The Conversation: How Black Men & Women Can Build Loving, Trusting Relationships	Hill Harper	Finalist	
2011	A Boy Should Know How to Tie a Tie: And Other Lessons for Succeeding in Life	Antwone Fisher	Winner	
2011	Diet-Free for Life: A Revolutionary Food, Fitness and Mindset Makeover to Maximize Fat Loss	Robert Ferguson	Finalist	
2011	If it Takes a Village, Build One: How I Found Meaning Through a Life of Service and 100+ Ways You Can Too	Malaak Compton Rock	Finalist	
2011	The Blueprint: A Plan for Living Above Life's Storms	Kirk Franklin	Finalist	
2011	The Little Black Book of Success: Laws of Leadership for Black Women	Elaine Brown, Rhonda McLean, and Marsha Haygood	Finalist	
2012	The T.D. Jakes Relationship Bible: Life Lessons on Relationships from the Inspired Word of God	T.D. Jakes	Winner	
2012	A Year to Wellness and Other Weight Loss Secrets	Bertice Berry	Finalist	
2012	Living My Dream: An Artistic Approach to Marketing	Synthia Saint James	Finalist	
2012	Our Difficult Sunlight: A Guide to Poetry, Literacy and Social Justice in Classroom & Community	Quraysh Ali Lansana	Finalist	
2012	Too Important to Fail: Saving America's Boys	Tavis Smiley	Finalist	
2013	Health First: The Black Woman's Wellness Guide	Eleanor Hinton Hoytt	Winner	
2013	12 Ways to Put Money in Your Pocket Every Month Without A Part Time Job; The Skinny Book That Makes Your Wallet Fat	Jennifer Matthews	Finalist	
2013	Formula 50: A 6-Week Workout and Nutrition Plan That Will Transform Your Life	50 Cent	Finalist	
2013	It's Complicated (But It Doesn't Have to Be): A Modern Guide to Finding and Keeping Love	Paul Carrick Brunson	Finalist	
2013	The No Excuse Guide to Success: No Matter What Your Boss or Life Throws at You	Jim Smith, Jr.	Finalist	
2014	The Vegucation of Robin: How Real Food Saved My Life	Robin Quivers	Winner	
2014	Do I Look Like an ATM? A Parent's Guide to Raising Financially Responsible African-American Children	Sabrina Lamb	Finalist	
2014	Plan D: How to Lose Weight and Beat Diabetes (Even If You Don't Have It)	Sherri Shepherd and Billie Fitzpatrick	Finalist	
2014	Recruiting and Retaining Culturally Different Students in Gifted Education	Donna Y. Ford	Finalist	
2014	The Entrepreneur Mind: 100 Essential Beliefs, Characteristics, and Habits of Elite Entrepreneurs	Kevin D. Johnson	Finalist	
2015	Promises Kept: Raising Black Boys to Succeed in School and in Life	Joe Brewster, Michèle Stephenson and Hilary Beard	Winner	
2015	101 Scholarship Applications: What It Takes to Obtain a Debt-Free College Education	Gwen Richardson	Finalist	
2015	10-Day Green Smoothie Cleanse	J. J. Smith	Finalist	
2015	Afro-Vegan: Farm-Fresh African, Caribbean and Southern Flavors Remixed	Bryant Terry	Finalist	
2015	Justice While Black: Helping African-American Families Navigate and Survive the Criminal Justice	Robbin Shipp and Nick Chiles	Finalist	
2016	Soul Food Love: Healthy Recipes Inspired by One Hundred Years of Cooking in a Black Family	Alice Randall and Caroline Randall Williams	Winner	
2016	Big Words to Little Me: Tips and Advice for the Younger Self	Sakina Ibrahim and Jessie Lee	Finalist	
2016	Free Your Mind: An African American Guide to Meditation and Freedom	Cortez R. Rainey	Finalist	
2016	Grandbaby Cakes: Modern Recipes, Vintage Charm, Soulful Memories	Jocelyn Delk	Finalist	
2016	Keep Calm… It’s Just Real Estate: Your No-Stress Guide to Buying a Home	Egypt Sherrod	Finalist	
2017	The Power of Broke: How Empty Pockets, a Tight Budget and a Hunger for Success Can Become Your Greatest Competitive Advantage	Daymond John and Daniel Paisner	Winner	
2017	Green Smoothies for Life	J. J. Smith	Finalist	
2017	LA Reid Sing to Me: My Story of Making Music, Finding Magic, and Searching for Who’s Next	L. A. Reid	Finalist	
2017	Running the Long Race in Gifted Education: Narratives and Interviews from Culturally Diverse Gifted Adults	Joy M. Scott-Carrol, Anthony Sparks, and Diana Slaughter Kotzin	Finalist	
2017	The Book of Joy: Lasting Happiness in a Changing World	Desmond Tutu and Douglas Abrams	Finalist	
2018	The Awakened Woman: Remembering & Reigniting Our Sacred Dreams	Tererai Trent	Winner	
2018	Ballerina Body: Dancing and Eating Your Way to a Leaner, Stronger, and More Graceful You	Misty Copeland	Finalist	
2018	Notoriously Dapper - How to Be A Modern Gentleman with Manners, Style and Body Confidence	Kelvin Davis	Finalist	
2018	Kristen Kish Cooking	Kristen Kish and Meredith Erickson	Finalist	
2018	Exponential Living - Stop Spending 100% of Your Time on 10% of Who You Are	Sheri Riley and Douglas Abrams	Finalist	
2019	Rise and Grind: Outperform, Outwork, and Outhustle Your Way to a More Successful and Rewarding Life	Daymond John and Daniel Paisner	Winner	
2019	Carla Hall's Soul Food: Everyday and Celebration	Carla Hall and Genevieve Ko	Finalist	
2019	For Colored Girls Who Have Considered Politics	Donna Brazile, Yolanda Caraway, Leah Daughtry, Minyon Moore, and Veronica Chambers	Finalist	
2019	Poised for Excellence: Fundamental Principles of Effective Leadership in the Boardroom and Beyond	Karima Mariama-Arthur	Finalist	
2019	Well-Read Black Girl: Finding Our Stories, Discovering Ourselves	Glory Edim	Finalist	

=== 2020s ===
Award winners and finalists
Year	Book	Author	Result	Ref.
2020	Your Next Level Life: 7 Rules of Power, Confidence, and Opportunity for Black Women in America	Karen Arrington, illus. by Joanna Price, foreword by Sheryl Taylor	Winner	
2020	Letters to the Finishers (Who Struggle to Finish)	Candace E. Wilkins	Finalist	
2020	More Than Pretty: Doing the Soul Work that Uncovers Your True Beauty	Erica Campbell	Finalist	
2020	Vegetables Unleashed	José Andrés	Finalist	
2020	Inspire Your Home: Easy, Affordable Ideas to Make Every Room Glamorous	Farah Merhi	Finalist	
2021	Vegetable Kingdom	Bryant Terry	Winner	
2021	Do Right by Me: Learning to Raise Black Children in White Space	Valerie Harrison	Finalist	
2021	Living Lively	Haile Thomas	Finalist	
2021	The Black Foster Youth Handbook	Ángela Quijada-Banks	Finalist	
2021	The Woman God Created You to Be: Finding Success Through Faith–Spiritually, Personally, and Professionally	Kimberla Lawson Roby	Finalist	
2022	Feeding the Soul (Because It's My Business)	Tabitha Brown	Winner	
2022	Permission to Dream	Chris Gardner	Finalist	
2022	The Conversation: How Seeking and Speaking the Truth About Racism Can Radically Transform Individuals and Organizations	Robert Livingston	Finalist	
2022	Teaching Black History to White People	Leonard N. Moore	Finalist	
2022	Diversity Is Not Enough: A Roadmap to Recruit, Develop and Promote Black Leaders in America	Keith Wyche	Finalist	
2023	Black Joy: Stories of Resistance, Resilience, and Restoration	Tracey Lewis-Giggetts	Winner	
2023	Cooking from the Spirit	Tabitha Brown	Finalist	
2023	Eat Plants, B*tch: 91 Vegan Recipes That Will Blow Your Meat-Loving Mind	Pinky Cole	Finalist	
2023	Homecoming: Overcome Fear and Trauma to Reclaim Your Whole Authentic Self	Thema Bryant	Finalist	
2023	The Five Principles: A Revolutionary Path to Health, Inner Wealth, and Knowledge of Self	Khnum Ibomu	Finalist	
2024	Historically Black Phrases: From “I Ain’t One of Your Lil’ Friends” to “Who All Gon” Be There?”	Jarett Hill and Tre'vell Anderson	Winner	
2024	Everyday Grand: Soulful Recipes for Celebrating Life’s Big and Small Moments	Jocelyn Delk Adams and Olga Massov	Finalist	
2024	Flower Love: Lush Floral Arrangements for the Heart and Home	Kristen Griffith–VanderYacht	Finalist	
2024	Badass Vegan: Fuel Your Body, Ph*ck the System, and Live Your Life Right	John Lewis	Finalist	
2024	Livable Luxe	Brigette Romanek	Finalist	

== Multiple wins and nominations ==
=== Wins ===
2 wins

- T.D. Jakes
- Daymond John

=== Nominations ===
3 nominations

- T.D. Jakes

2 nominations

- Daymond John
- Tavis Smiley
- Bryant Terry
