= Diet for a Small Planet =

1971 book by Frances Moore Lappé

- Author: Frances Moore Lappé
- Illustrator: Kathleen Zimmerman and Ralph Iwamoto
- Subject: Cookbook, vegetarianism
- Publisher: Ballantine Books
- Publication date: 1971
- Publication place: United States
- Pages: 301
- ISBN: 978-0-307-87431-3
- OCLC: 247743
- Dewey Decimal: 641.6/3/1
- LC Class: TX392 .L27

Diet for a Small Planet is a 1971 book by Frances Moore Lappé. It was a bestseller in the West, and argues for the potential role of soy as a superior form of protein. It demonstrates the environmental impact of meat production and how it is a contributor to global food scarcity. She argued for environmental vegetarianism—practising a vegetarian lifestyle out of concerns over the impacts of animal-based industries and the production of animal-based products on the environment.

The book has sold over three million copies and was groundbreaking for arguing that world hunger is not caused by a lack of food but by ineffective food policy. In addition to information on meat production and its impact on hunger, the book features simple rules for a healthy diet and hundreds of meat-free recipes. "Its mix of recipes and analysis typified radicals' faith in the ability to combine personal therapy with political activism."

== Structure ==
- Part I: Earth's Labor Lost—Protein in United States agribusiness
- Part II: Bringing Protein Theory Down to Earth—Protein in human nutrition
- Part III: Eating From the Earth: Protein Theory Applied—Includes tables of food values, and explanations relating proteins to caloric and economic factors
- Part IV: Combining Non-Meat Foods to Increase Protein Values—Guidelines and recipes
- Appendices, Notes, Index

== Protein combining ==
Knowing that her audience would be skeptical that a vegetarian diet could supply sufficient protein, much of the book is devoted to introducing the method of protein combining. With this method of eating, different plant foods are taken together so that their combined amino acid pattern better matches that required by our bodies, termed "net protein utilization". The general principle of combining foods for optimum net protein utilization combines adjacent pairs of the following: [dairy] with [grains] with [legumes] with [seeds].

But while Lappé was correct that combining would indeed result in a more meat-like protein profile, eating a variety of plant foods throughout the day will provide one with all the amino acids required by humans, in amounts which satisfy growth and maintenance. There is no need to combine foods at individual meals.

Lappé admitted in the 10th anniversary 1981 version of the book that sufficient protein was easier to get than she had thought at first:

In 1971 I stressed protein complementarity because I assumed that the only way to get enough protein ... was to create a protein as usable by the body as animal protein. In combating the myth that meat is the only way to get high-quality protein, I reinforced another myth. I gave the impression that in order to get enough protein without meat, considerable care was needed in choosing foods. Actually, it is much easier than I thought.

With three important exceptions, there is little danger of protein deficiency in a plant food diet. The exceptions are diets very heavily dependent on [1] fruit or on [2] some tubers, such as sweet potatoes or cassava, or on [3] junk food (refined flours, sugars, and fat). Fortunately, relatively few people in the world try to survive on diets in which these foods are virtually the sole source of calories. In all other diets, if people are getting enough calories, they are virtually certain of getting enough protein.

In some traditional cuisines there is a balance of 70% whole grains to 30% legumes, which may vary to 80% grains with 20% legumes. This tradition can be seen expressed in three regions:

- Latin America: beans with tortillas or rice;
- Middle East: bulgur wheat with chickpeas, or pita falafel with hummus;
- Asia: soy with rice (southern China, northern Japan, Indonesia), soy with wheat or millet (northern China), or soy with barley (Korea and southern China).

Other recent authors mention that traditional cuisine in Africa combines sorghum or millet with ground nuts. The first edition, published by Ballantine, was sponsored by the Friends of the Earth organization. It includes recipes based on the complementary combinations and was followed by a collection, Recipes for a Small Planet by Ellen Buchman Ewald, with an introduction written by Lappé. A film carrying Lappé's message was distributed by Bullfrog Films.

== Additional books ==
- Lappé, Frances Moore; Ewald, Ellen Buchman (1974). Great Meatless Meals. Ballantine. ISBN 978-0-345-23957-0 – via Internet Archive.
- Lappé, Frances Moore; Lappé, Anna (28 April 2003). Hope's Edge: The Next Diet for a Small Planet. Penguin Putnam. ISBN 978-1-58542-237-1 – via Internet Archive.
- Lappé, Anna (2010). Diet for a Hot Planet: The Climate Crisis at the End of Your Fork and What You Can Do about It (First U.S. ed.). New York: Bloomsbury. ISBN 978-1-59691-659-3. Discusses the connection between food production and climate change.

== See also ==
- Food security
- Veganism
