= 48th NAACP Image Awards =

American entertainment awards for 2016 works

- Date: February 11, 2017
- Site: Pasadena, California
- Hosted by: Anthony Anderson
- Official website: NAACPImageAwards.net

Television coverage
- Network: TV One

The 48th NAACP Image Awards, presented by the NAACP, honored outstanding representations and achievements of people of color in motion pictures, television, music and literature during the 2016 calendar year. The 48th ceremony was hosted by Anthony Anderson and broadcast on TV One on February 12, 2017.

American 14th Secretary of the Smithsonian Institution, Lonnie Bunch was honored with the President's Award for his studies of American and African history, as well as his contribution as the founding director of the Smithsonian's National Museum of African American History and Culture. Harvard Law School ProfessorCharles Ogletree was awarded with the Chairman's Award.

All nominees are listed below, and the winners are listed in bold.

== Special awards ==
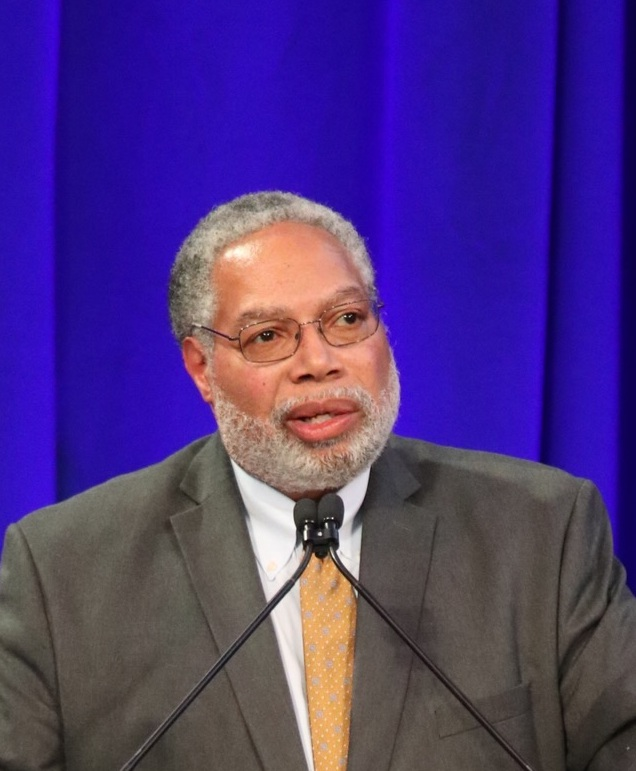
Lonnie Bunch was honored with the President's Award

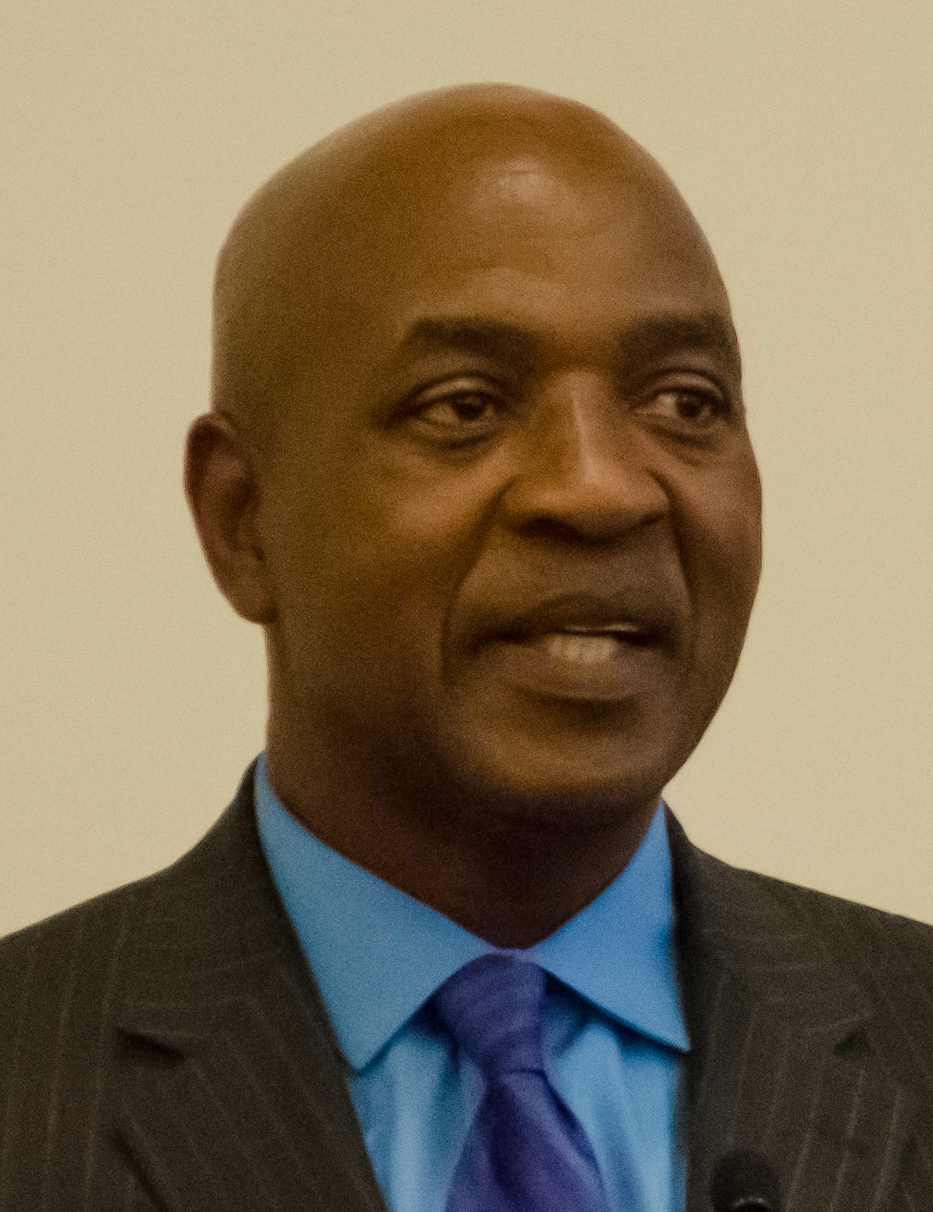
Charles Ogletree was honored with the Chairman's Award

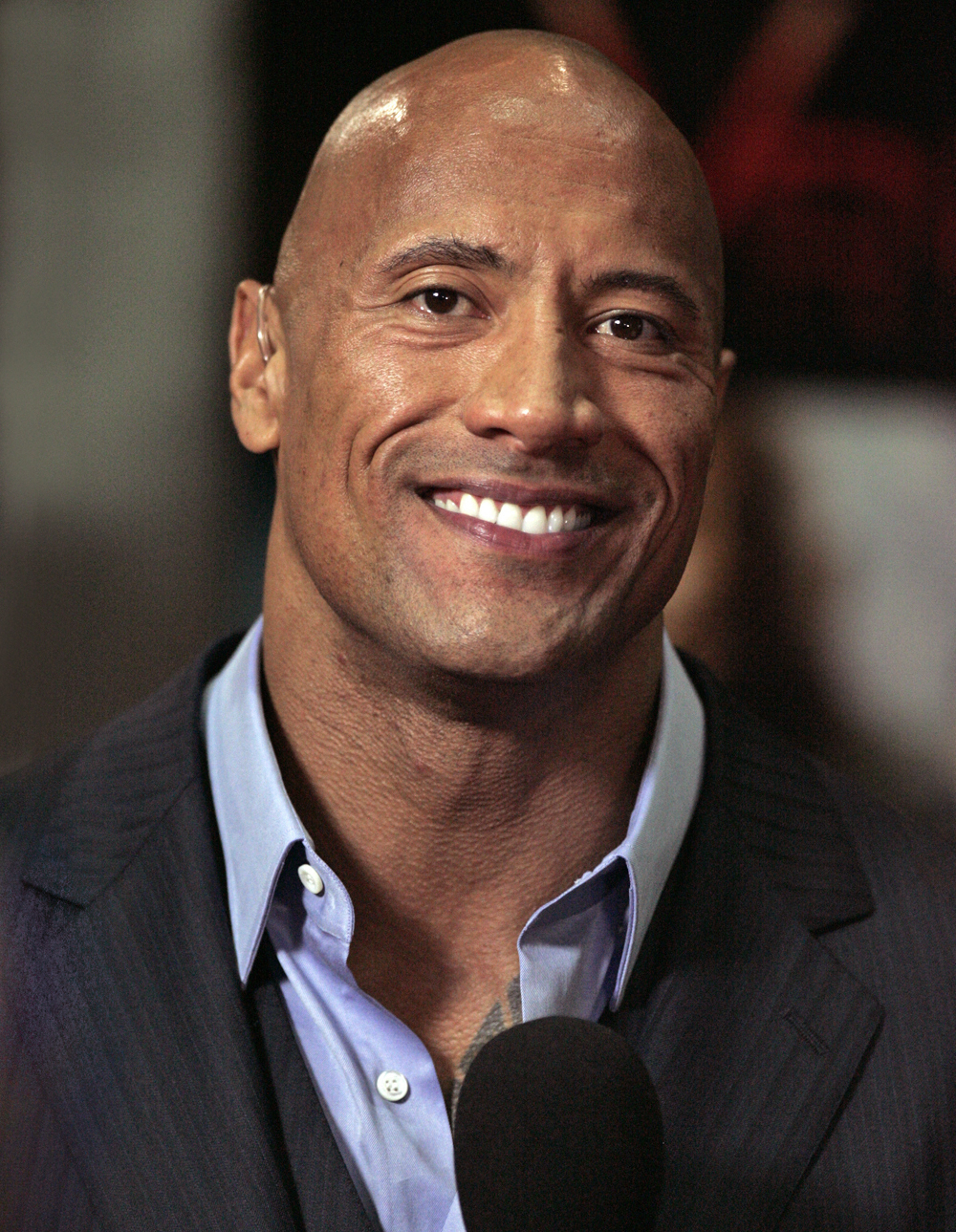
Dwayne "the Rock" Johnson was honored with the Entertainer of the Year Award

President's Award
- **Lonnie Bunch**
Chairman's Award
- **Charles Ogletree**
Entertainer of the Year
- **Dwayne "the Rock" Johnson**
- Beyoncé
- Viola Davis
- Regina King
- Chance the Rapper

== Motion Picture ==
**Outstanding Motion Picture**: **Hidden Figures**; The Birth of a Nation; Fences; Loving; Moonlight	**Outstanding Directing in a Motion Picture**: **Barry Jenkins – Moonlight**; Nate Parker – The Birth of a Nation; Anthony and Joe Russo – Captain America: Civil War; Garth Davis – Lion; Mira Nair – Queen of Katwe
**Outstanding Actor in a Motion Picture**: **Denzel Washington – Fences**; Don Cheadle – Miles Ahead; Stephan James – Race; Nate Parker – The Birth of a Nation; Will Smith – Collateral Beauty	**Outstanding Actress in a Motion Picture**: **Taraji P. Henson – Hidden Figures**; Angela Bassett – London Has Fallen; Madina Nalwanga – Queen of Katwe; Ruth Negga – Loving; Tika Sumpter – Southside With You
**Outstanding Supporting Actor in a Motion Picture**: **Mahershala Ali – Moonlight**; Chadwick Boseman – Captain America: Civil War; Alano Miller – Loving; David Oyelowo – Queen of Katwe; Trevante Rhodes – Moonlight	**Outstanding Supporting Actress in a Motion Picture**: **Viola Davis – Fences**; Aja Naomi King – The Birth of a Nation; Mo’Nique – Almost Christmas; Lupita Nyong'o – Queen of Katwe; Octavia Spencer – Hidden Figures
**Outstanding Writing in a Motion Picture**: **Barry Jenkins – Moonlight**; Adam Mansbach – Barry; Nate Parker – The Birth of a Nation; Jeff Nichols – Loving; Richard Tanne – Southside With You	**Outstanding Independent Motion Picture**: **Moonlight**; The Birth of a Nation; Lion; Loving; Miles Ahead

== Television ==
=== Outstanding Drama Series ===
- **Queen Sugar**
  - Empire
  - Power
  - This Is Us
  - Underground

=== Outstanding Actor in a Drama Series ===
- **Sterling K. Brown – This Is Us**
  - Mike Colter – Luke Cage
  - Omari Hardwick – Power
  - Terrence Howard – Empire
  - Kofi Siriboe – Queen Sugar

=== Outstanding Actress in a Drama Series ===
- **Taraji P. Henson – Empire**
  - Viola Davis – How to Get Away with Murder
  - Jurnee Smollett-Bell – Underground
  - Kerry Washington – Scandal
  - Rutina Wesley – Queen Sugar

=== Outstanding Supporting Actor in a Drama Series ===
- **Jussie Smollett – Empire**
  - Trai Byers – Empire
  - Alfred Enoch – How to Get Away with Murder
  - Joe Morton – Scandal
  - Jesse Williams – Grey's Anatomy

=== Outstanding Supporting Actress in a Drama Series ===
- **Naturi Naughton – Power**
  - CCH Pounder – NCIS: New Orleans
  - Cicely Tyson – How to Get Away with Murder
  - Lynn Whitfield – Greenleaf
  - Amirah Vann – Underground

=== Outstanding Directing in a Dramatic Series ===
- **John Singleton – The People v. O. J. Simpson: American Crime Story – "The Race Card"**
  - Millicent Shelton – Empire – The Lyon Who Cried Wolf"
  - Sam Esmail – Mr. Robot – "eps2.5_h4ndshake.sme"
  - Paris Barclay – Pitch – "Pilot"
  - Anthony Hemingway – Underground – "The Macon 7"

=== Outstanding Writing in a Dramatic Series ===
- **Ava DuVernay – Queen Sugar – "First Things First"**
  - Akela Cooper – Luke Cage – "Manifest"
  - Anthony Sparks – Queen Sugar – "By Any Chance"
  - Joe Robert Cole – The People v. O. J. Simpson: American Crime Story – "The Race Card"
  - LaToya Morgan – Turn: Washington's Spies – "Benediction"

=== Outstanding Comedy Series ===
- **Black-ish**
  - Atlanta
  - The Carmichael Show
  - Insecure
  - Survivor's Remorse

=== Outstanding Actor in a Comedy Series ===
- **Anthony Anderson – Black-ish**
  - Don Cheadle – House of Lies
  - Donald Glover – Atlanta
  - Kevin Hart – Real Husbands of Hollywood
  - Dwayne Johnson – Ballers

=== Outstanding Actress in a Comedy Series ===
- **Tracee Ellis Ross – Black-ish**
  - Uzo Aduba – Orange is the New Black
  - Niecy Nash – The Soul Man
  - Issa Rae – Insecure
  - Keesha Sharp – Lethal Weapon

=== Outstanding Supporting Actor in a Comedy Series ===
- **Laurence Fishburne – Black-ish**
  - Miles Brown – Black-ish
  - Tituss Burgess – Unbreakable Kimmy Schmidt
  - Deon Cole – Black-ish
  - David Alan Grier – The Carmichael Show

=== Outstanding Supporting Actress in a Comedy Series ===
- **Adrienne C. Moore – Orange is the New Black**
  - Erica Ash – Survivor's Remorse
  - Laverne Cox – Orange Is the New Black
  - Marsai Martin – Black-ish
  - Yvonne Orji – Insecure

=== Outstanding Directing in a Comedy Series ===
- **Donald Glover – Atlanta – "Value"**
  - Anton Cropper – Black-ish – "God"
  - Anton Cropper – Black-ish – "Good-ish Times"
  - Melina Matsoukas – Insecure – "Insecure as F**k"
  - Marta Cunningham – Transparent – "Exciting and New"

=== Outstanding Writing in a Comedy Series ===
- **Kenya Barris – Black-ish – "Hope"**
  - Donald Glover – Atlanta – "B.A.N."
  - Issa Rae and Larry Wilmore – Insecure – "Insecure as F**k"
  - Prentice Penny – Insecure – "Real as F**k"
  - Our Lady J – Transparent – "If I Were a Bell"

=== Outstanding Television Movie, Limited-Series or Dramatic Special ===
- **The People v. O. J. Simpson: American Crime Story**
  - American Crime
  - Confirmation
  - The Night Of
  - Roots

=== Outstanding Actor in a Television Movie, Limited-Series or Dramatic Special ===
- **Courtney B. Vance – The People v. O. J. Simpson: American Crime Story**
  - Sterling K. Brown – The People v. O. J. Simpson: American Crime Story
  - Cuba Gooding Jr. – The People v. O. J. Simpson: American Crime Story
  - Malachi Kirby – Roots
  - Jeffrey Wright – Confirmation

=== Outstanding Actress in a Television Movie, Limited-Series or Dramatic Special ===
- **Regina King – American Crime**
  - Emayatzy Corinealdi – Roots
  - Audra McDonald – Lady Day at Emerson's Bar and Grill
  - Anika Noni Rose – Roots
  - Kerry Washington – Confirmation

=== Outstanding Directing in a Motion Picture (Television) ===
- **Rick Famuyiwa – Confirmation**
  - Carl Seaton – Bad Dad Rehab
  - Mario Van Peebles – Roots (Night 2)
  - Thomas Carter – Roots (Night 3)
  - Vondie Curtis-Hall – Toni Braxton: Unbreak My Heart

=== Outstanding Writing in a Motion Picture – (Television) ===
- **Charles Murray – Roots (Night 3)**
  - Alison McDonald – An American Girl Story - Melody 1963: Love Has to Win
  - Rashida Jones and Michael Schur – Black Mirror ("Nosedive")
  - Rhonda Freeman-Baraka – Merry Christmas, Baby!
  - Alison McDonald – Roots (Night 2)

=== Outstanding Performance by a Youth (Series, Special, Television Movie or Limited Series) ===
- **Marsai Martin – Black-ish**
  - E'myri Crutchfield – Roots
  - Hudson Yang – Fresh Off The Boat
  - Lonnie Chavis – This Is Us
  - Miles Brown – Black-ish

=== Outstanding Talk Series ===
- **Steve Harvey**
  - The Real
  - Super Soul Sunday
  - The Talk
  - The View

=== Outstanding Variety (Series or Special) ===
- **2016 Black Girls Rock**
  - Celebrity Family Feud
  - The Essence Black Women in Hollywood Awards 2016
  - Lemonade
  - Lip Sync Battle

=== Outstanding Reality Program/Reality Competition Series ===
- **Iyanla: Fix My Life**
  - Little Big Shots
  - Mary Mary
  - United Shades of America
  - The Voice

=== Outstanding Children’s Program ===
- **An American Girl Story - Melody 1963: Love Has to Win**
  - All In with Cam Newton
  - Doc McStuffins
  - K.C. Undercover
  - The Lion Guard

=== Outstanding News / Information – (Series or Special) ===
- **BET Presents: Love And Happiness: An Obama Celebration**
  - AM Joy with Joy Reid
  - StarTalk with Neil deGrasse Tyson
  - Stay Woke
  - Unsung: Sugarhill Gang

=== Outstanding Host in a Talk, Reality, News/ Information or Variety (Series or Special) ===
- **Roland S. Martin – NewsOne Now with Roland S. Martin (TV One)**
  - Anthony Anderson and Tracee Ellis Ross – BET Awards 2016
  - W. Kamau Bell – United Shades of America
  - Steve Harvey – Steve Harvey
  - Joy Reid – AM Joy with Joy Reid

== Documentary ==
=== Outstanding Documentary – (Film) ===
- **13th**
  - I Am Not Your Negro
  - Maya Angelou: And Still I Rise
  - Miss Sharon Jones!
  - Olympic Pride, American Prejudice

=== Outstanding Documentary – (Television) ===
- **Roots: A New Vision**
  - Major League Legends: Hank Aaron
  - Policing the Police
  - Roots: A History Revealed
  - Streets of Compton

== Animated/CGI ==
=== Outstanding Character Voice-Over Performance – (Television or Film) ===
- **Idris Elba – The Jungle Book**
  - Loretta Devine – Doc McStuffins
  - Idris Elba – Finding Dory
  - Kevin Hart – The Secret Life of Pets
  - Dwayne Johnson – Moana

== Music ==
=== Outstanding New Artist ===
- **Chance the Rapper**
  - Ro James
  - MAJOR.
  - Serayah
  - Chloe x Halle

=== Outstanding Male Artist ===
- **Maxwell**
  - Chance the Rapper
  - Kendrick Lamar
  - Bruno Mars
  - Anthony Hamilton

=== Outstanding Female Artist ===
- **Beyoncé**
  - Fantasia
  - Alicia Keys
  - K. Michelle
  - Solange

=== Outstanding Duo, Group or Collaboration ===
- **Beyoncé feat. Kendrick Lamar – "Freedom"**
  - Alicia Keys feat. ASAP Rocky – "Blended Family (What You Do for Love)"
  - Solange feat. Lil Wayne – "Mad"
  - Robert Glasper and Miles Davis – "Everything's Beautiful"
  - Sounds of Blackness feat. HSRA (High School for Recording Arts) – "Royalty"

=== Outstanding Jazz Album ===
- **Edward Simon – Latin American Songbook**
  - Leslie Odom Jr. – Leslie Odom Jr.
  - Branford Marsalis Quartet and Kurt Elling – Upward Spiral
  - Robert Glasper and Miles Davis – Everything's Beautiful
  - Erroll Garner – Ready Take One

=== Outstanding Gospel Album – Traditional or Contemporary ===
- **Tamela Mann – One Way**
  - Donnie McClurkin – The Journey (Live)
  - Myron Butler – Myron Butler & Levi On Purpose
  - Livre – Jericho: Tribe of Joshua
  - Fred Hammond – Worship Journal Live

=== Outstanding Music Video ===
- **Beyoncé – "Formation"**
  - Johnny Gill feat. New Edition – "This One's for Me and You"
  - Bruno Mars – "24K Magic"
  - Solange – "Cranes in the Sky"
  - Alicia Keys – "In Common"

=== Outstanding Song, Contemporary ===
- **Beyoncé feat. Kendrick Lamar – "Freedom"**
  - Common feat. Bilal – "Letter to the Free"
  - Sounds of Blackness feat. HSRA (High School for Recording Arts) – "Royalty"
  - Bruno Mars – "24K Magic"
  - Beyoncé – "Formation"

=== Outstanding Song, Traditional ===
- **Kim Burrell and Pharrell Williams – "I See Victory"**
  - Solange – "Cranes in the Sky"
  - Anthony Hamilton – "Amen"
  - Tamela Mann – "God Provides"
  - Maxwell – "Lake by the Ocean"

=== Outstanding Album ===
- **Beyoncé – Lemonade**
  - Solange – A Seat at the Table
  - Kendrick Lamar – untitled unmastered.
  - Chance the Rapper – Coloring Book
  - Anthony Hamilton – What I'm Feelin'

== Literature ==
=== Outstanding Literary Work, Fiction ===
- **Bernice L. McFadden – The Book of Harlan**
  - Jacqueline Woodson – Another Brooklyn
  - Lawrence Hill – The Illegal
  - Yvvette Edwards – The Mother
  - Colson Whitehead – The Underground Railroad: A Novel

=== Outstanding Literary Work, Non-Fiction ===
- **Margot Lee Shetterly – Hidden Figures**
  - Eddie S. Glaude Jr. – Democracy in Black: How Race Still Enslaves the American Soul
  - Angela Y. Davis – Freedom is a Constant Struggle
  - Ibram X. Kendi – Stamped from the Beginning: The Definitive History of Racist Ideas in America
  - Kareem Abdul-Jabbar and Raymond Obstfeld – Writings on the Wall: Searching for a New Equality Beyond Black and White

=== Outstanding Literary Work, Debut Author ===
- **Trevor Noah – Born A Crime: Stories from a South African Childhood**
  - Lisa Fenn – Carry On
  - Nicole Gonzalez Van Cleve Crook County: Racism and Injustice in America's Largest Criminal Court
  - Natashia Deón – Grace: A Novel
  - Cory Booker – United: Thoughts on Finding Common Ground and Advancing the Common Good

=== Outstanding Literary Work, Biography/Auto-Biography ===
- **Trevor Noah – Born a Crime: Stories from a South African Childhood**
  - Taraji P. Henson – Around the Way Girl: A Memoir
  - Nathaniel Jones – Answering the Call: An Autobiography of the Modern Struggle to End Racial Discrimination in America
  - Mychal Denzel Smith – Invisible Man, Got the Whole World Watching, A Young Black Man's Education
  - Herb Powell and Maurice White – My Life with Earth, Wind & Fire

=== Outstanding Literary Work, Instructional ===
- **Daymond John and Daniel Paisner – The Power of Broke: How Empty Pockets, a Tight Budget, and a Hunger for Success Can Become Your Greatest Competitive Advantage**
  - JJ Smith – Green Smoothies for Life
  - LA Reid – LA Reid Sing to Me: My Story of Making Music, Finding Magic, and Searching for Who's Next
  - Joy M. Scott-Carrol and Anthony Sparks – Running the Long Race in Gifted Education: Narratives and Interviews from Culturally Diverse Gifted Adults
  - The Dalai Lama, Desmond Tutu, and Douglas Abrams – The Book of Joy: Lasting Happiness in a Changing World

=== Outstanding Literary Work, Poetry ===
- **Rita Dove – Collected Poems: 1974 – 2004**
  - Clint Smith – Counting Descent
  - Jamaal May – The Big Book of Exit Strategies
  - Joshua Bennett – The Sobbing School
  - Phillip B. Williams – Thief in the Interior

=== Outstanding Literary Work, Children ===
- **Andrea Davis Pinkney – A Poem for Peter: The Story of Ezra Jack Keats and the Creation of The Snowy Day**
  - Karissa Culbreath – Daddy's Little Girl
  - Javaka Steptoe – Radiant Child: The Story of Young Artist Jean-Michel Basquiat
  - Nikkolas Smith – The Golden Girls Of Rio
  - Gwendolyn Hooks – Tiny Stitches: The Life of Medical Pioneer Vivien Thomas

=== Outstanding Literary Work, Youth/Teens ===
- **Jason Reynolds – As Brave As You**
  - Christine Kendall – Riding Chance
  - Holly Robinson Peete, Ryan Elizabeth Peete, and RJ Peete - Same But Different: Teen Life on the Autism Express
  - Sharon Robinson – The Hero Two Doors Down: Based on the True Story of Friendship Between a Boy and a Baseball Legend
  - Olugbemisola Rhuday-Perkovich and Audrey Vernick – Two Naomis
