= HSRA =

HSRA may refer to:

- High School for Recording Arts, a public charter high school in Saint Paul, Minnesota, United States
- High Speed Rail Authority, an Australian Government agency tasked with advising on and overseeing the development of high speed rail on Australia's eastern seaboard
- Hindustan Socialist Republican Association, a defunct Indian revolutionary organisation that operated from 1924 to 1940
- HSRA, the Indian Railways station code for Hosur railway station, Tamil Nadu, India
