= Vegetable Kingdom =

2020 vegan cookbook by Bryant Terry

Vegetable Kingdom: The Abundant World of Vegan Recipes
- Author: Bryant Terry
- Language: English
- Publisher: Penguin
- Publication date: February 11, 2020

Vegetable Kingdom: The Abundant World of Vegan Recipes, often shortened to Vegetable Kingdom, is a 2020 James Beard Award nominated cookbook by Bryant Terry. It received positive reviews and won an NAACP Image Award. Recipes are based on the cuisines of the African diaspora. The book provides a song pairing for each dish.

== Soundtrack ==
For each recipe Bryant suggests a song pairing, which he calls the recipe's "soundtrack". The pairings include Cab Calloway’s "Jumpin Jive" with a recipe for stuffed peppers, “Flat of the Blade” from Massive Attack with a recipe for dirty cauliflower, and Solange’s “Stay Flo” with a recipe for mashed kabocha. Bryant, who comes from a musical family, has said he considers food and music inseparable and refers to his pairings as "cooking as collage".

== Influences ==
According to Francis Lam, Terry has said his "approach to cooking is inspired by hip-hop producers", which Lam describes as "taking a little bit of this, taking a little bit of that, and remixing things." The recipes are vegan and based around the flavors of the African diaspora.

== Reception ==
Vegetable Kingdom was nominated for the 2022 James Beard Foundation Award. It was one of Splendid Table's Spring Picks in 2020. It received a starred review from Publishers Weekly and won an NAACP Image Award for Outstanding Literary Work – Instructional. The New Yorker called it "a stylish, inspiring love letter" to cooking with vegetables. Joe Yonan, writing in The Washington Post, said "I can’t think of the last time I marked this many dishes to try, the very first time I flipped through a book." It was named to several "best of" lists, including The New Yorker, The Washington Post, San Francisco Chronicle, Food & Wine, and Vogue. VegNews named Vegetable Kingdom one of the "Top 100 Vegan Cookbooks of All Time" in 2024.

== Publication ==
The hardcover and ebook were released by Penguin on February 11, 2020.

== Awards and honors ==
Year	Awards and Honors	Event
2022	Finalist (nominated)	James Beard Foundation Award: Vegetable Focused Cooking for Vegetable Kingdom: The Abundant World of Vegan Recipes,.
