= Bryant Terry =

American chef (born 1974)

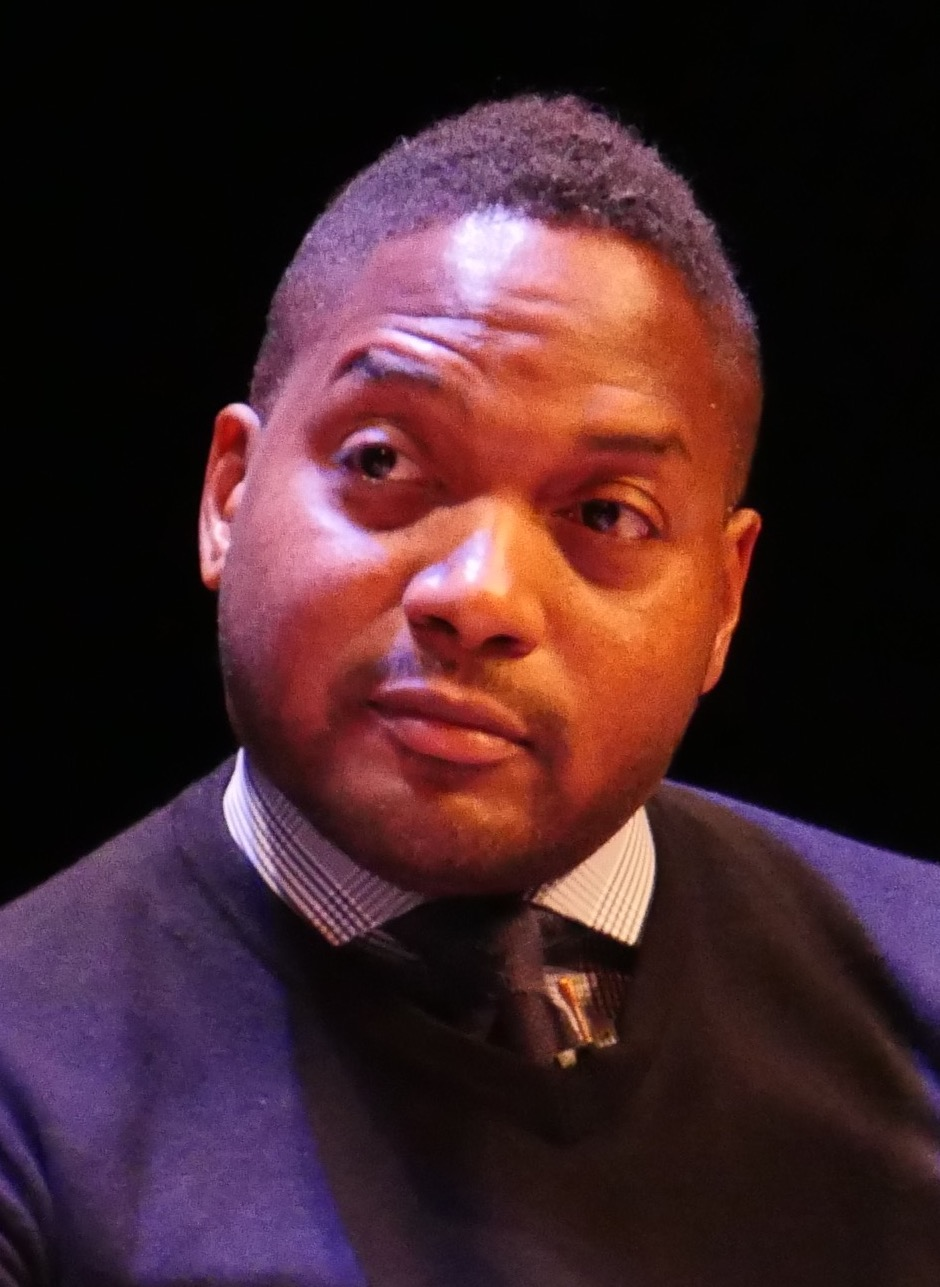
- Bryant Terry in 2016
- Born: January 24, 1974 (age 52); Memphis, Tennessee, U.S.
- Education: Xavier University of Louisiana; New York University (MA)
- Occupations: Chef, author
- Spouse: Jidan Terry-Koon
- Website: bryant-terry.com

Bryant Terry (born January 24, 1974) is an African-American vegan chef, food justice activist, and author. He has written four vegan cookbooks and cowrote a book about organic eating. He won a 2015 James Beard Foundation Leadership Award for his food justice work. In 2021 he was awarded an NAACP Image Award for his book Vegetable Kingdom, which was also nominated in 2022 for a James Beard Award, and received a starred review from Publishers Weekly.

== Early life and education ==
Terry's parents are Beatrice Terry, a neonatal nurse, and Booker Terry, an environmental protection specialist.

Terry grew up in Memphis, Tennessee. He attended Xavier University of Louisiana, graduating with a degree in English. He then moved to New York City to attend graduate school at New York University, where he earned an M.A. in history. While at NYU, after hearing a hip-hop song about factory farming, he switched to a plant-based diet and started reading about early efforts to address food injustice. He then enrolled in the chef's training program at the Natural Gourmet Institute for Health and Culinary Arts in New York City.

== Career ==
In 2001, Terry founded b-healthy! (Build Healthy Eating And Lifestyles To Help Youth), a five-year initiative created to raise awareness about food justice issues and empower youth to be active in creating a more just and sustainable food system. The program taught children in underserved neighborhoods how to cook in an afterschool program, sending the kids back home with their prepared foods to provide their family a meal. In 2002 he received a Community Fellowship from the Open Society Institute (Soros Foundation) to support b-healthy's work, in which he led chef-educators Ludie Minaya, Elizabeth Johnson, and Latham Thomas in reaching out to thousands of youth in the United States.

In the spring of 2003, Terry met author Anna Lappé. That fall they began writing a Grub: Ideas for an Urban Organic Kitchen (ISBN 1585424595), which was soon bought by Tarcher/Penguin and published in 2006. Grub received a 2007 Nautilus Book Award for Social Change.

Among his national radio and television appearances, Terry has offered his commentary on the Sundance Channel's original series Big Ideas for a Small Planet. He has been a guest chef on three episodes of the BET series My Two Cents. Terry was also a host on the PBS series The Endless Feast.

Terry is a consultant for the Bioneers Conference. He has helped raise funds for the People's Grocery in West Oakland, and he consults for other not-for-profit organizations as well as corporations. He appeared on the "Nourish: Food + Community" PBS special that aired in 2008, and he has also served on the advisory board for the project's educational component.

From 2008 to 2010, Terry was a Food and Society Policy Fellow, a national program of the W. K. Kellogg Foundation.

In 2015, Terry was named the inaugural Chef-in-Residence for the Museum of the African Diaspora in San Francisco.

The Atlanta Journal-Constitution in 2020 said of Terry that he had "dedicated much of his life to educating others about sustainable agriculture and healthy eating through the lens of the African Diaspora." Ten Speed Press announced in 2021 that Terry would start an imprint called 4 Color Books focused on writers of color.

== Writing and speaking engagements ==
Terry's writing and recipes have been featured in Gourmet, Food & Wine, The New York Times Magazine, the San Francisco Chronicle, Vibe, Domino, Mothering, Plenty, Delicious Living, and other print magazines. He has contributed to ABC.com and TheRoot.com among others. His column on The Root, "Eco-Soul Kitchen", offers thoughts, recipes, tools, and tips for sustainable eating and living. His essay, "Reclaiming True Grits", was widely circulated on the web and sparked heated debate about "soul food". Distinguishing traditional soul food the "instant soul food" that began emerging in the late 1960s, Terry wrote: "Sadly, over the past four decades most of us have forgotten that what many African Americans in the South ate for dinner just two generations ago was diverse, creative, and comprised of a lot of fresh, local, and homegrown nutrient-dense food."

In 2015, Terry gave a talk at the annual TEDMED conference on "Stirring up political change from the kitchen".

== Recognition ==
In 2012 Terry was named to TheGrio's 100 list. In 2014 Afro-Vegan was listed as one of the best cookbooks of 2014 by Mother Jones (honorable mention) and Serious Eats.

In 2015 Terry won a James Beard Foundation Leadership Award for his food justice work.

Terry's 2020 book Vegetable Kingdom: The Abundant World of Vegan Recipes was nominated for a James Beard Award (Media: Vegetable Focused Cooking) in 2022 and won an NAACP Image Award for Outstanding Literary Work – Instructional. It also received a starred review from Publishers Weekly.

In 2023, Tasting Table named Terry as one of the "21 Plant-Based Chefs You Need To Know". and VegNews listed him as one of the "37 Creative Chefs Crafting the Future of Vegan Food". In 2024, VegNews also listed Terry as one of the "17 Black Vegan Chefs Redefining Plant-Based Food and Community".

VegNews listed Afro-Vegan as one of the "Top 100 Vegan Cookbooks of All Time" in 2024.

== Personal life ==
Terry married Jidan Koon, an organizational development consultant, in September 2010. They reside in Oakland, California, with their children.

== Bibliography ==
- Grub: Ideas for an Urban Organic Kitchen (2006). With Anna Lappe. Penguin Group. ISBN 9781440628252
- Vegan Soul Kitchen: Fresh, Healthy, and Creative African-American Cuisine (2009). Da Capo Press. ISBN 9780786745036
- The Inspired Vegan: Seasonal Ingredients, Creative Recipes, Mouthwatering Menus (2012) Da Capo Press. ISBN 9780738215471
- Afro-Vegan: Farm-Fresh African, Caribbean, and Southern Flavors Remixed (2014). Ten Speed Press. ISBN 9781607745327
- Vegetable Kingdom: The Abundant World of Vegan Recipes (2020) Ten Speed Press. ISBN 9780399581045
- Black Food: Stories, Art & Recipes from Across the African Diaspora (2021). ed. Bryant Terry with Oriana Koren. Ten Speed Press. ISBN 9781984859723
