= Linda Villarosa =

American author and journalist (born 1959)

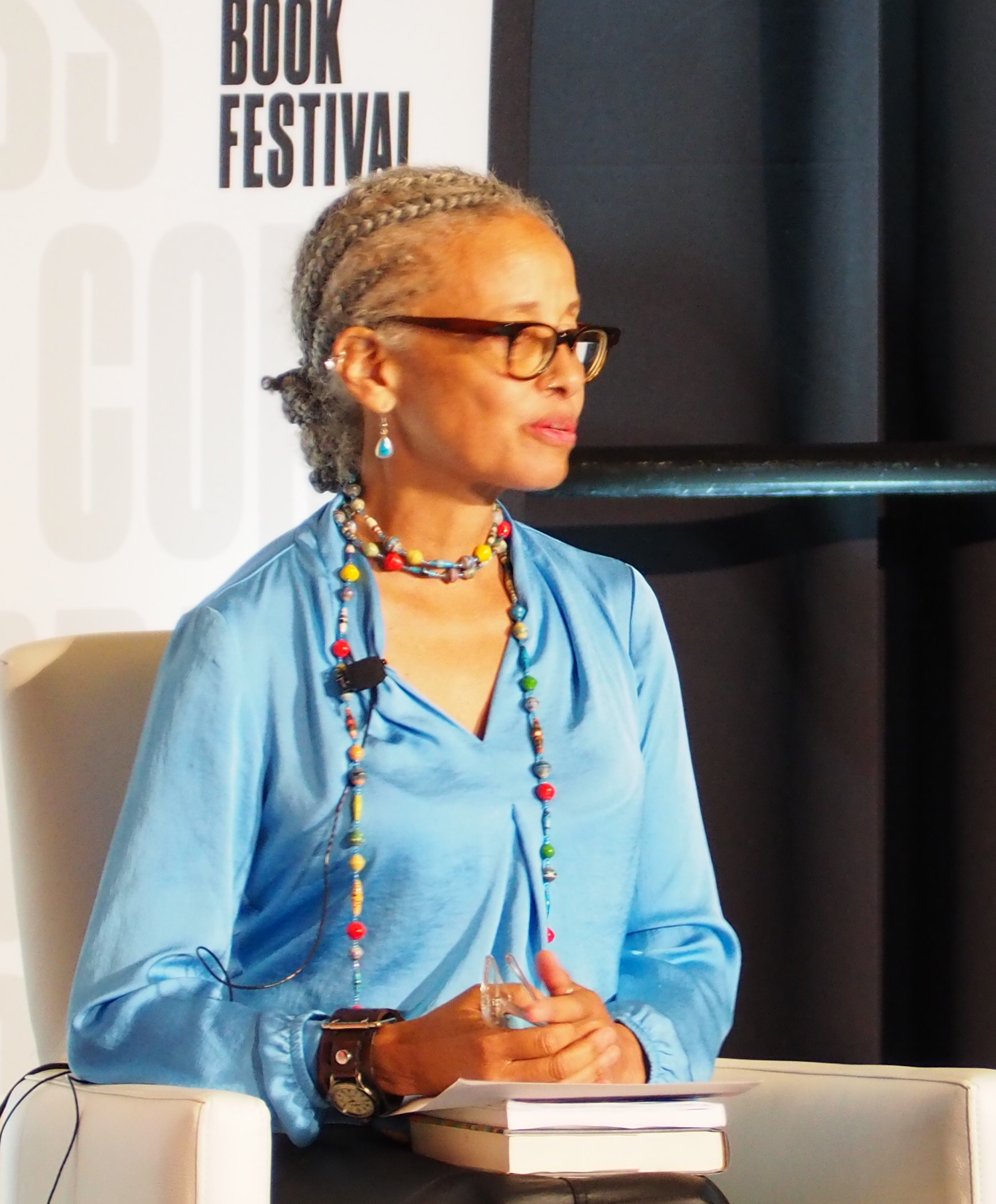
- Born: January 9, 1959 (age 67)
- Education: University of Colorado Boulder (BA); CUNY Graduate School of Journalism (MA)
- Occupations: Journalist; novelist

Linda Villarosa (born January 9, 1959) is an American author and journalist who is a former executive editor of Essence magazine. She has worked on health coverage for Science Times. She is also author of several books, and her first novel, Passing for Black, was nominated for a Lambda Literary Award in 2008.

== Personal life ==
Villarosa was born on January 9, 1959. Her mother Clara Villarosa is also an author, publisher and motivational speaker. Linda Villarosa is a graduate of the University of Colorado Boulder and spent a year at Harvard School of Public Health as a journalism fellow. She also earned a master's degree in urban journalism/digital storytelling in 2013 from the CUNY Graduate School of Journalism. She lives in Brooklyn with her partner, two children and pets.

== Career ==
Linda Villarosa was awarded the Lillian Smith Book Award for her book: "Under the Skin: The Hidden Toll of Racism on Health in America" in September 2023. Linda Villarosa has covered women's and African-American health issues in The New York Times, The Root, O Magazine, Glamour, Health, Vibe and Woman’s Day. She was nominated for a GLAAD Media Award in the Outstanding Magazine Article category for an article in Essence titled "Pride and Prejudice."

She is a co-founder of Villarosa Media, other co-founders being her mother Clara Villarosa and sister Alicia. In 2008, her first novel, Passing for Black, was published. She is author and co-author of three books, including Body & Soul: The Black Women’s Guide to Physical Health and Emotional Well-Being. Villarosa worked as a consultant to provide editorial expertise to companies and organizations like American Express Publishing and Meredith. She also directs the undergraduate journalism program at the City College of New York. Additionally, she is a journalist in residence and professor at the CUNY Craig Newmark School of Journalism (formerly the CUNY Graduate School of Journalism).
