= National Sustainable Agriculture Coalition =

- Abbreviation: NSAC
- Predecessor: Sustainable Agriculture Coalition and National Campaign for Sustainable Agriculture
- Formation: 2009; 17 years ago
- Type: Alliance
- Purpose: Farm policy
- Headquarters: Washington, D.C.
- Members: 130+
- Key people: Aimee Witteman (Executive Director)
- Website: https://sustainableagriculture.net/

The National Sustainable Agriculture Coalition (NSAC) is an alliance of over 130 member groups working to promote and enhance sustainable food and farm policy at the federal level. Headquartered in Washington, D.C., NSAC aims to equally prioritize supporting, building, developing and engaging the grassroots of sustainable agriculture by researching, developing and advocating federal policies.

NSAC's advocacy begins with input from sustainable and organic farmers, ranchers, and member organizations that work closely with producers. NSAC develops policy priorities through its member-based issue committees. While NSAC staff conduct direct advocacy and education on policy issues to legislators and federal agencies on Capitol Hill, member organizations lead outreach and implementation work on the local, state, and regional levels.

== History ==
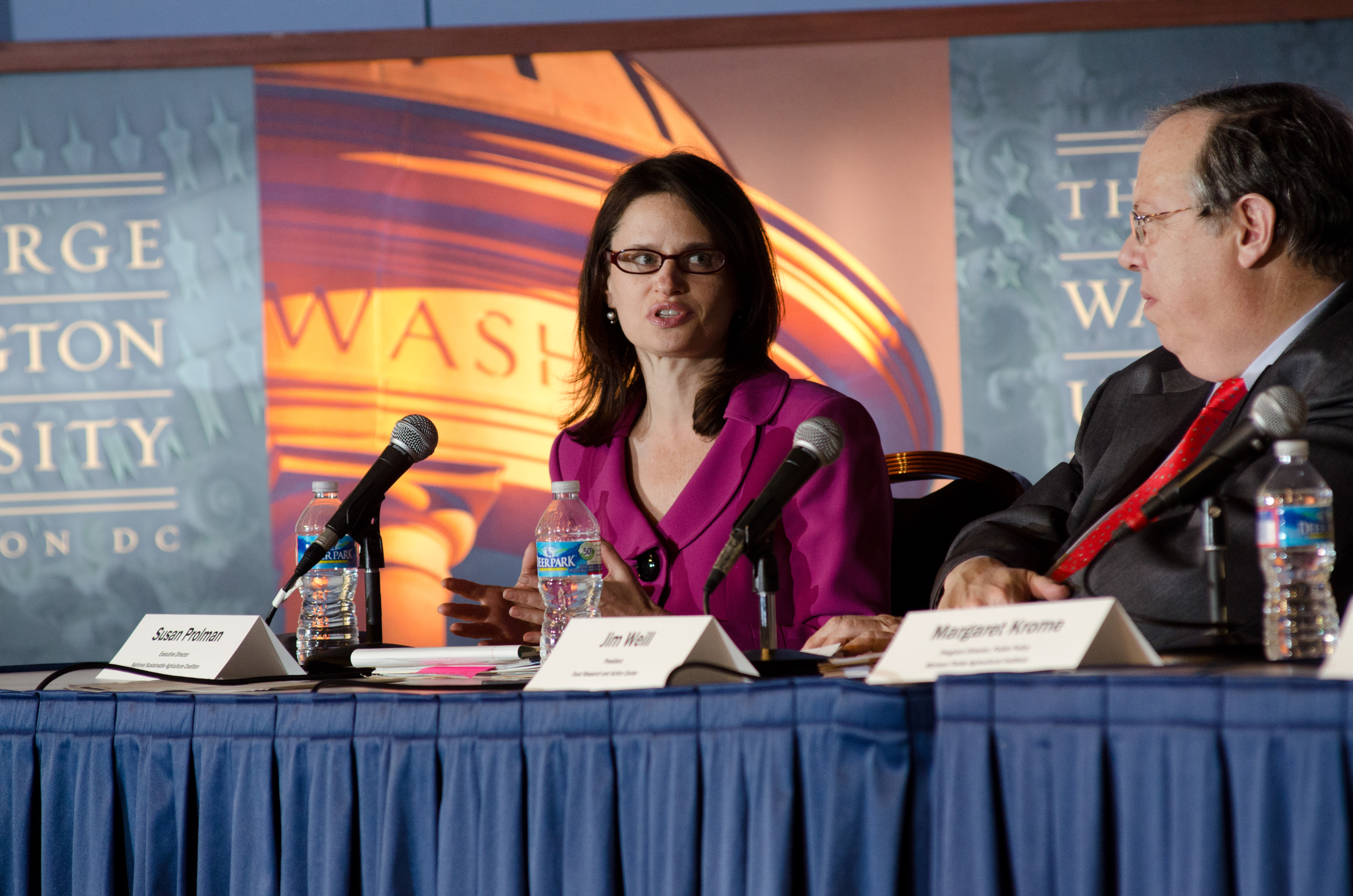
National Sustainable Agriculture Coalition Executive Director Susan Prolman responds to a question during an event at George Washington University in 2012

NCSA formed in 1994 with a mission of bringing together diverse voices to influence federal food policy. In 2009, the respective governing bodies of Sustainable Agriculture Coalition (SAC) and National Campaign for Sustainable Agriculture (NCSA) voted to merge. SAC was originally a midwest-based organization that formed as a direct result of the mid-1980s farm crisis. In 2003, SAC members voted to form a national coalition in order to expand their representation in Washington, D.C.

NSAC's definition of a sustainable agricultural system is one that produces readily available, affordable, nutritious food; provides farmers and laborers a high standard of living; and promotes the health of the environment and of communities.

NSAC has been involved in the creation of federal programs, including: Conservation Stewardship Program (CSP), Wetlands Reserve Program (WRP), and Cooperative Conservation Partnership Initiative (CCPI) as part of the National Resources Conservation Service (NRCS); Value-Added Producer Grants Program (VAPG) as part of USDA Office of Rural Development; Beginning Farmer and Rancher Development Program (BFRDP) as part of USDA's National Institute of Food and Agriculture (NIFA); Farmers Market and Local Food Promotion Program (FMLFPP) as part of USDA Agriculture Marketing Service; National Organic Certification Cost Share Program (NOCCSP) as part of the National Organic Program (NOP); and Sustainable Agriculture Research and Education Program (SARE).

== Organizational structure ==
NSAC's member organizations represent the interests of almost all 50 states and the District of Columbia, and are supported by a core staff in Washington, D.C. NSAC staff work with represented and participating members on issue-based councils and committees.

Potential NSAC member groups serve on the NSAC Issue Committees as well as the Policy Council and Organizational Council. Participating Members can serve on NSAC Issue Committees and attend NSAC events, but do not receive formal representation by NSAC on the Hill.

NSAC is overseen by three distinct governing councils: the Organizational Council, Grassroots Council, and Policy Council. The Organizational Council oversees development, membership, planning, and execution of NSAC mission. All potential NSAC members must first be approved by the Organizational Council before joining the coalition. The Grassroots Council coordinates NSAC's advocacy efforts among member organizations, including media messaging and action alerts pertaining to campaigns. Within the Grassroots Council, the Diversity Committee works to ensure NSAC actively practices its commitment to equity and raising social justice concerns in relation to NSAC's policy priorities and advocacy strategies. The Policy Council sets NSAC's yearly policy priorities after taking into consideration recommendations from each of NSAC's issue committees.

NSAC Issue Committees focus on research and development of specific federal farm and food policies, in accordance with the annual priorities set by the Policy Council. Issue Committees meet monthly to discuss policy strategies and coordinate action across states and regions. There are currently five Policy Issue Committees that work on diverse, but often overlapping, topics:

- Research, Education and Extension (REE) focuses on USDA and other public agricultural research and extension programs as well as the Sustainable Agriculture Research and Education Program (SARE).
- Marketing, Food Systems, and Rural Development Committee (MFSRD) explores value-added marketing channels for sustainably-produced farm goods as well as economic strategies that build the vitality and sustainability of rural communities.
- Conservation, Energy, and Environment (CEE) helps formulate policy options and positions on a broad array of agricultural conservation programs, renewable energy policy, and environmental policy issues.
- Farming Opportunities and Fair Competition (FOFC) aims to improve market conditions for farmers by advocating for commodity program reform, farm credit, and beginning farmer and rancher provisions, among others.
- Food System Integrity (FSI) develops and advances policies that ensure a safe food supply and support family farms, healthy food systems, and opportunities for sustainable farmers.
