= Clara Villarosa =

American entrepreneur, author, publisher and motivational speaker

- Born: 1930
- Education: Roosevelt University; Loyola University; University of Denver
- Occupations: Entrepreneur; writer; publisher
- Writing career
- Genre: African-American literature
- Notable work: Down to Business: The First 10 Steps to Entrepreneurship for Women

Clara Villarosa is an American entrepreneur, author, publisher and motivational speaker. She is the co-founder of Villarosa Media and was the founder of Hue-Man Bookstores in Denver, Colorado and Harlem, New York, one of the highest earning African-American bookstores in the country from the 1980s to the 2010s. Her book, Down to Business: The First 10 Steps to Entrepreneurship for Women was nominated for an NAACP Image Award. Villarosa founded the African American Booksellers Association.

In January 2016, she co-founded Villarosa Media with her daughters, Linda Villarosa and Alicia Villarosa. The company focuses on publishing new books from established black authors and classic books reissued in digital formats with print on demand (POD) capability. Its first published book was The Wind Is Spirit: The Life, Love and Legacy of Audre Lorde. In 2016, she was featured in the film, Dream, Girl.

== Early life and education ==
Born in 1930, Villarosa was raised in Chicago. She earned a bachelor's degree in education and psychology at Roosevelt University and a master's degree in social work from Loyola University. Following her studies, she worked until 1959 as a psychiatric social worker at Mount Sinai Hospital in Chicago before becoming a full-time mother. The family later moved to Denver, Colorado where Villarosa became the chief psychiatric social worker at the Department of Behavioral Science at Denver's Children's Hospital and later director of the department. Villarosa later attended the Graduate School of Social Work Doctoral Program and College of Law at the University of Denver. She worked temporarily as the employee relations manager at the United Bank of Denver during this time and later became Vice president of Human Resources and Strategic Planning.

== Entrepreneurial career ==
Villarosa opened the Hue-Man Experience Bookstore in Denver in 1984. After 16 years, Villarosa sold the Denver bookstore in 2000. She moved to New York City and opened the Hue-Man Bookstore & Cafe in Harlem featuring a large collection of books by African-American authors. The store was located near the Apollo Theatre and became the largest African-American bookstore in the country. It hosted events featuring former President Bill Clinton, Terry McMillan, James Baldwin, Colin Powell, Wynton Marsalis, and Toni Morrison. Maya Angelou read at the store's opening.

In January 2016, at the age of 85, she co-founded Villarosa Media with her daughters, Linda and Alicia Villarosa. The company focuses on publishing new books from established black authors and classic books reissued in digital formats with print on demand (POD) capability. Its first published book was The Wind Is Spirit: The Life, Love and Legacy of Audre Lorde.

== Other work ==
As of January 2017, Villarosa is on the board of trustees for the University of Denver. Villarosa founded the African American Booksellers Association. She previously served on the boards of Colorado Small Business Development Center, Malcolm X and Dr. Betty Shabazz Memorial and Educational Center, and the New Federal Theatre.

== Books ==
- Down to Business: The First 10 Steps to Entrepreneurship for Women (2009), Penguin, ISBN 1101139927
- The Words of African-American Heroes (2011), HarperCollins, ISBN 1557049823

== See also ==
- NAACP Image Award for Outstanding Literary Work, Instructional
- List of women writers
