= Anna Lappé =

American author and educator

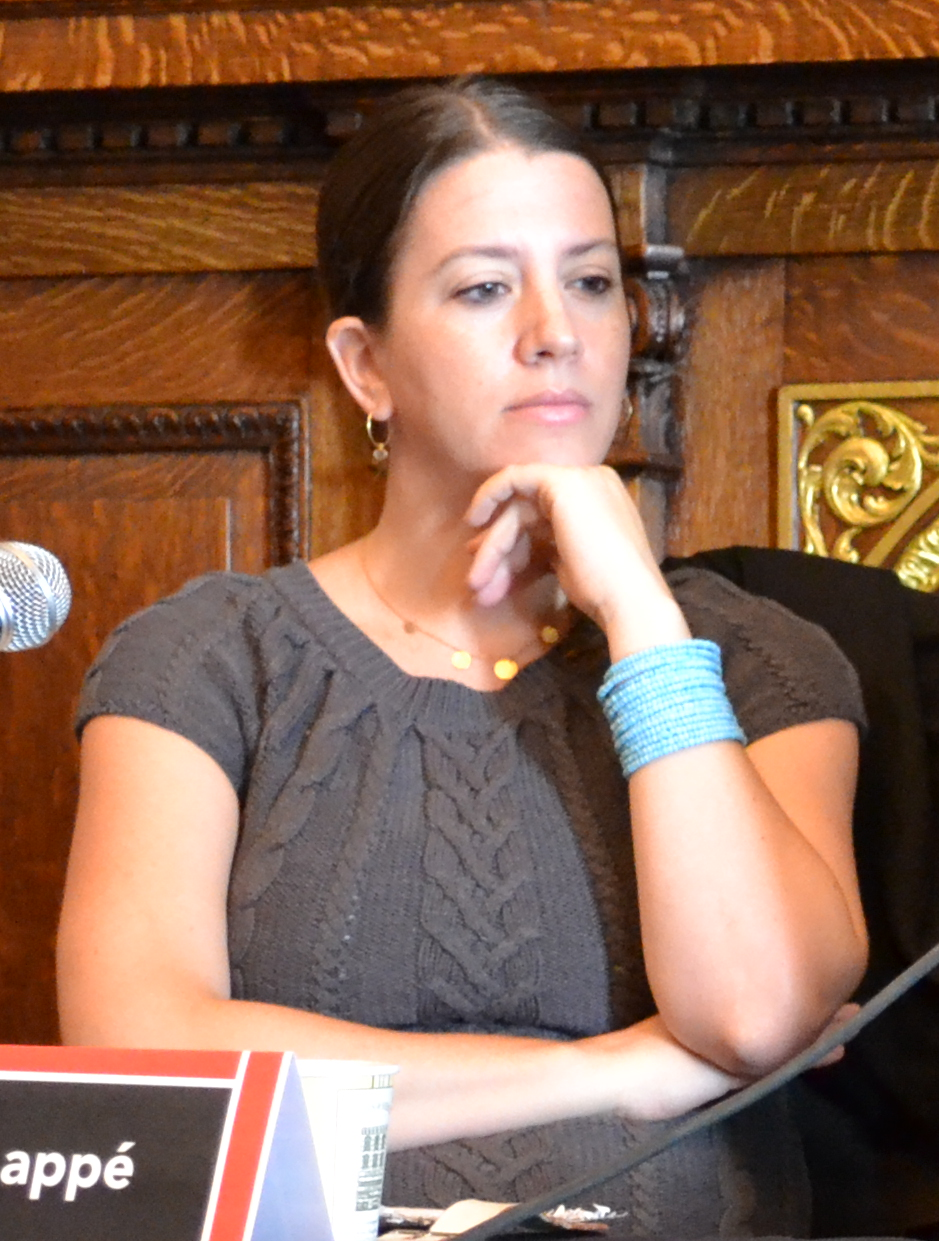
Lappé at the 2011 Brooklyn Book Festival

Anna Lappé (born 1973) is an American author and educator, known for her work as an expert on food systems and as a sustainable food advocate. The co-author or author of three books and the contributing author to over ten others, Lappé's work has been widely translated internationally and featured in The New York Times, Gourmet, O, The Oprah Magazine, Domino, Food & Wine, Body+Soul, Natural Health, Utne Reader, and Vibe, among other outlets.

With her mother Frances Moore Lappé, Lappé co-founded the Cambridge-based Small Planet Institute, an international network for research and popular education about the root causes of hunger and poverty. The Lappés are also co-founders of the Small Planet Fund, which has raised nearly $1 million for democratic social movements worldwide, two of which have won the Nobel Peace Prize since the Fund's founding in 2002. Lappé's research on sustainable agriculture has taken her from Brooklyn to South Korea, China, Bangladesh, India, Poland, France, Italy, Mali, Kenya, South Africa, Zimbabwe, Botswana, Brazil, Mexico, Canada, and beyond.

== Biography ==
Lappé is the daughter of author Frances Moore Lappé and toxicologist Marc Lappé. She holds an M.A. in Economic and Political Development from Columbia University's School of International and Public Affairs and graduated with honors from Brown University. From 2004 to 2006, she was a Food and Society Fellow, a national program of the W. K. Kellogg Foundation. In 2010, she was the first "Innovator" with the Glynwood Institute for Sustainable Food and Farming. Among other consulting and advisory roles, Lappé is an active board member of Rainforest Action Network and an advisor to the International Fund to Amplify Agro-Ecological Solutions. She was born in Yonkers, and lives in the Bay Area with her husband and daughters.

== Writings ==
Lappé's writing and advocacy have earned her numerous accolades. In 2009, The New York Times Magazine featured her among a handful of "food fighters". In 2007, she was chosen by the Missing Peace Project for the Compassion in Action Award and in 2006 Lappé was selected for Contribute magazine's "21 Under 40 Making a Difference" and Time magazine's "Eco" Who's Who.

=== Books ===
- Diet for a Hot Planet: The Climate Crisis at the End of Your Fork and What You Can Do About It (Bloomsbury 2010) describes how current industrial agricultural practices contribute to global climate change and offers a prescription for climate-friendly eating.
- Grub: Ideas for an Urban Organic Kitchen (Tarcher/Penguin 2006) combines an exposé of industrial agriculture with chef Bryant Terry's seasonal menus.
- Hope's Edge: The Next Diet for a Small Planet (Tarcher/Penguin 2002), co-written with her mother Frances Moore Lappé, chronicles courageous social movements around the world addressing the root causes of hunger and poverty. Winner of the Nautilus Award for Social Change, Hope's Edge has been published in several languages and is used in classrooms across the country.

Lappé has also contributed to the following books:

- Foreword for: Restoration Agriculture: Real-World Permaculture for Farmers, Mark Shepard (Austin, Texas: Acres U.S.A., 2013)
- Farmscape: The Changing Rural Environment, eds. Mary Swander, Gene Logsdon, Frederick Kirschenmann, J. Harley McIlrath (North Liberty, IA: Ice Cube Press, LLC, 2012)
- State of the World 2011: Innovations That Nourish the Planet, The Worldwatch Institute (New York: W. W. Norton & Co., 2011)
- The CAFO Reader: The Tragedy of Industrial Animal Factories, ed. Dan Imhoff (University of California Press, 2010)
- Gristle: From Factory Farms to Food Safety, eds. Moby and Miyun Park (New York: The New Press, 2010)
- 100 Words: Two Hundred Visionaries Share Their Hope for the Future, ed. William L. Murtha (San Francisco: Conari Press, 2010)
- Moonrise: The Power of Women Leading from the Heart, eds. Nina Simons with Anneke Campbell (Rochester, Vermont: Park Street Press, 2010)
- Food Inc.: A Participant Guide: How Industrial Food is Making Us Sicker, Fatter, and Poorer-And What You Can Do About It, eds. Karl Weber and Participant Media (United States: PublicAffairs, 2009)
- Foreword for: Feeding Baby Green: The Earth Friendly Program for Healthy, Safe Nutrition During Pregnancy, Childhood, and Beyond, Alan Greene (San Francisco: Jossey-Bass, 2009)
- Ten Excellent Reasons to Think Twice about Eating Meat, ed. Moby (New York: The New Press, 2007)
- Feeding the Future, From Fat to Famine: How to Solve the World's Food Crisis eds. Andrew Heintzman and Evan Solomon (Toronto: Anansi Press, 2004)
- Take Back Your Time: Fighting Overwork and Time Poverty in America ed. John de Graaf (San Francisco: Berrett-Koehler, 2003)
- We Got Issues!: A Young Women's Guide to a Bold, Courageous and Empowered Life eds. Rha Goddess and J-Love Calderon (Novato, California: Inner Ocean: 2006)
- WorldChanging: A User's Guide to the 21st Century, ed. Alex Steffen (Harry N. Abrams Books: 2006)
- Democracy's Edge, Frances Moore Lappé (San Francisco: Jossey-Bass, 2005)
- You Have the Power: Choosing Courage in a Culture of Fear, Frances Moore Lappé and Jeff Perkins (New York City: Tarcher/Putnam, 2004)
- Foreword for: How to Live Your Dream of Volunteering Overseas, Joe Collins, Stephan DeZerega, Zahara Heckscher (New York: Putnam, 2002)

=== Articles ===
Lappé's writing has been published in The Washington Post, The Wall Street Journal, The Guardian, Los Angeles Times, International Herald Tribune, and Canada's The Globe and Mail, among others. She wrote a bi-monthly column on sustainability for Spirituality & Health Magazine and has contributed book reviews for the San Francisco Chronicle and New Scientist. In 2006, Lappé was a consulting editor for a special issue on food for The Nation and has consulted with Heifer International on their magazine, World Ark.

== Public speaking ==
A frequent public speaker, in the past decade Lappé has participated in more than 500 events, from community food festivals to university lectures to emceeing a food-focused fundraiser at Sotheby's. She has been a keynote speaker and guest lecturer at dozens of colleges and universities, including Boston College, the University of Colorado, Boulder, University of California, Santa Cruz, Dominican University, Brown University, Dickinson College, University of Montana at Missoula, University of Texas at El Paso, Columbia University, Gallatin School at NYU, Yale University, Eckerd College in Florida, and many more.

== Television and radio appearances ==
Lappé can be seen as the co-host of the public television series, The Endless Feast and as a featured expert on PBS's Need to Know, the Sundance Channel's Big Ideas for a Small Planet and the PBS documentary, Nourish. She is a regular guest on nationally syndicated radio shows and has been on hundreds of radio programs, including National Public Radio's Weekend Edition, The Diane Rehm Show, and WNYC's Brian Lehrer Show and Leonard Lopate Show.

== Advisory posts and boards ==
Lappé is an active board member of Rainforest Action Network and serves informally in an advisory capacity to a number of grassroots media organizations and documentary films. She is a former board member of the Center for Media and Democracy, the Community Food Security Coalition (2005–2006) and b-healthy (Build Healthy Eating and Lifestyles to Help Youth), a New York City-based non-profit organization (2004–2006).
