= Frances Moore Lappé =

American researcher and author

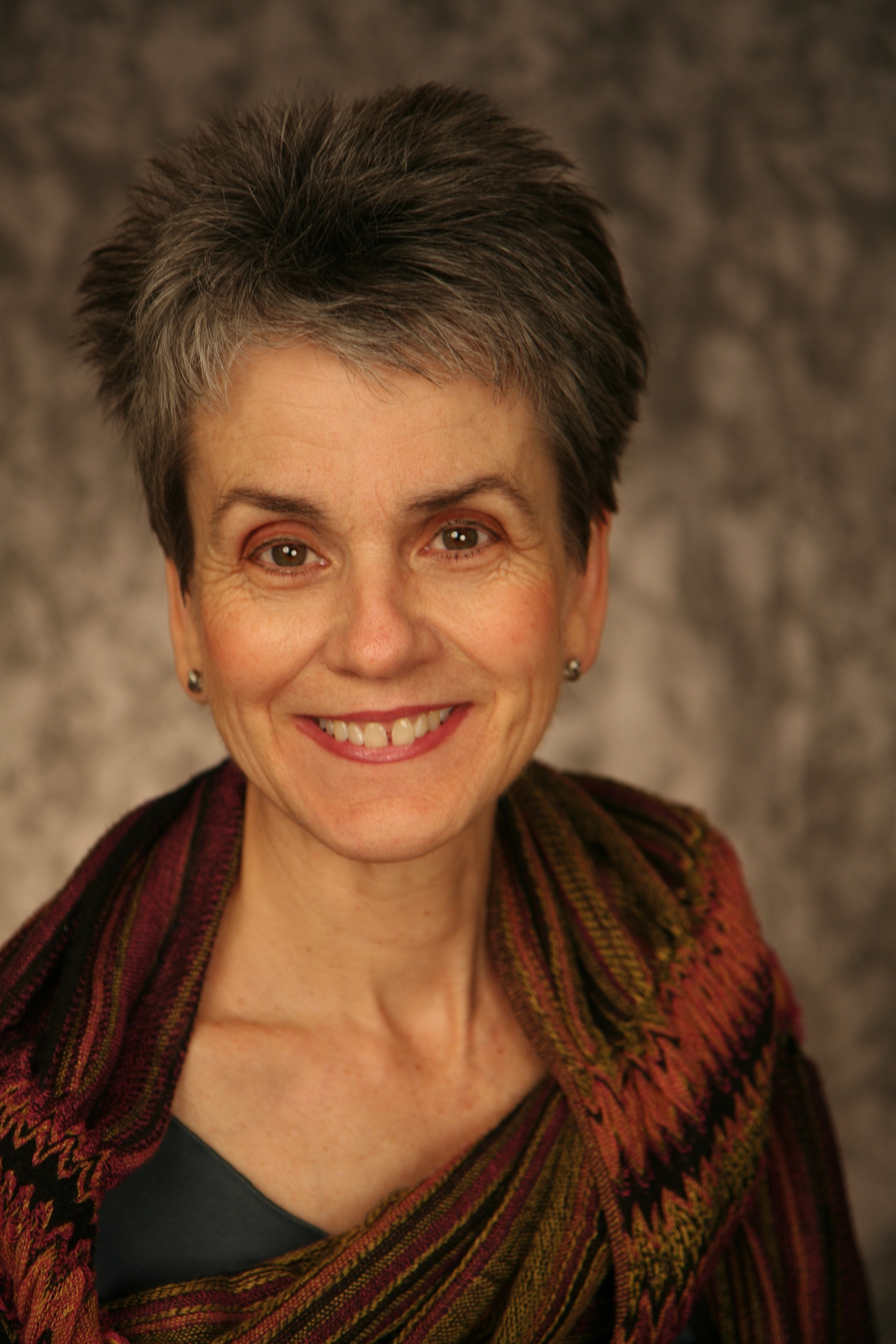
- Lappé in 2008
- Born: Frances Moore; February 10, 1944 (age 82); Pendleton, Oregon, U.S.
- Occupations: Writer, activist, speaker
- Partner: Richard R. Rowe
- Writing career
- Subjects: Social change, living democracy
- Notable work: Diet for a Small Planet
- Notable awards: Right Livelihood Award, Rachel Carson Award, Women's National Book Association, James Beard Humanitarian of the Year, twenty honorary doctorates

Frances Moore Lappé (born February 10, 1944) is an American researcher and author in the field of food and democracy policy. She is the author of 20 books including the 2.5-million-copy selling 1971 book Diet for a Small Planet, which the Smithsonian's National Museum of American History describes as "one of the most influential political tracts of the times." She has co-founded three organizations that explore the roots of hunger, poverty, and environmental crises, as well as solutions emerging worldwide through what she calls "living democracy". Her latest work is a report entitled Crisis of Trust: How Can Democracies Protect Against Dangerous Lies? with Max Boland and Rachel Madison. Recent books by Lappé include Daring Democracy: Igniting Power, Meaning, and Connection for the America We Want, co-authored with Adam Eichen, and It's Not Too Late: Crisis, Opportunity, and the Power of Hope. In 1987, she was awarded the Right Livelihood Award for "revealing the political and economic causes of world hunger and how citizens can help to remedy them."

== Early life ==
Lappé was born in 1944 in Pendleton, Oregon, to John and Ina Moore and grew up in Fort Worth, Texas. After graduating from Earlham College in 1966, she married toxicologist and environmentalist Dr. Marc Lappé in 1967. They have two children, Anthony and Anna Lappé. She briefly attended University of California at Berkeley for graduate studies in social work.

== Career ==
"Over the years many people have been surprised when meeting the author of Diet for a Small Planet. I am not the gray-haired matron they expect. Nor am I a back-to-nature purist. (Sometimes I even wear lipstick!) But mouths really drop open when I explain that I am not a vegetarian. Over the last ten years I've hardly ever served or eaten meat, but I try hard to distinguish what I advocate from what people think of as 'vegetarianism'... what I advocate is a return to the traditional diet on which our bodies evolved. Traditionally the human diet has centered on plant foods, with animal foods playing a supplementary role. Our digestive and metabolic systems evolved over millions of years on such a diet. Only very recently have Americans, and people in some other industrial countries, begun to center their diets on meat. So it is the meat-centered diet-and certainly the grain-fed-meat centered diet-that is the fad."

— Frances Moore Lappé, Diet for a Small Planet.

=== Political, nutritional and environmental research ===
Throughout her works Lappé has argued that world hunger is caused not by the lack of food but rather by the inability of hungry people to gain access to the abundance of food that exists in the world and/or food-producing resources because they are simply too poor. She has posited that our current "thin democracy" creates a maldistribution of power and resources that inevitably creates waste and an artificial scarcity of the essentials for sustainable living.

Lappé makes the argument that what she calls "living democracy", i.e., democracy understood as a way of life, is not merely a structure of government. The three conditions essential for democracy, she writes in Daring Democracy and elsewhere, are the wide dispersion of power, transparency in public affairs, and a culture of mutual accountability, not blaming. These three conditions enable humans to experience a sense of agency, meaning, and connection, which she describes as the essence of human dignity. Democracy is not only what we do in the voting booth but involves our daily choices of what we buy and how we live. She believes that only by "living democracy" can we effectively solve today's social and environmental crises.

Lappé began her writing career early in life. She first gained prominence in the early 1970s with the publication of her book Diet for a Small Planet, which has sold 2.5 million copies.

In 1975, with Joseph Collins, she launched the California-based Institute for Food and Development Policy (Food First) to educate Americans about the causes of world hunger. In 1990, Lappé co-founded the Center for Living Democracy, a nine-year initiative to accelerate the spread of democratic innovations in which regular citizens contribute to problem-solving. She served as founding editor of the center's American News Service (1995–2000), which placed stories of citizen problem-solving in nearly half the nation's largest newspapers.

In 2002, Lappé and her daughter Anna established the Small Planet Institute based in Cambridge, Massachusetts, a collaborative network for research and popular education to bring democracy to life. With her daughter, she traveled the world and wrote Hope's Edge. The two also co-founded the Small Planet Fund, channeling resources to democratic social movements worldwide.

In 2006 she was chosen as a founding councilor of the Hamburg-based World Future Council. She is also a member of the International Commission on the Future of Food and Agriculture and the National Advisory Board of the Union of Concerned Scientists. She serves as an advisor to the Calgary Centre for Global Community and on the board of David Korten's People-Centered Development Forum. In 2009 she joined the advisory board of Corporate Accountability International's Value the Meal campaign. Lappé is a Contributing Editor to YES! Magazine.

=== Teaching positions ===
Lappé has also held various teaching and scholarly positions:

- From 1984 to 1985, she was a visiting scholar at the Institute for the Study of Social Change at the University of California, Berkeley.
- From 2000 to 2001, she was a visiting scholar at the Massachusetts Institute of Technology, Cambridge, Massachusetts.
- In 2003, she taught with Dr. Vandana Shiva in Dehra Dun, India, about the roots of world hunger, sponsored by the Navdanya researching and agricultural demonstration center.
- In 2004, she taught a course on "living democracy" at Schumacher College in England.
- In 2006 and 2008, she was a visiting professor at Suffolk University in Boston.
- In 2013–2014, she was the Andrew W. Mellon Distinguished Fellow in Environmental Studies at Colby College in Maine.
- In 2021, Frances was Indiana University's Patten Lecturer.

== Recognition ==
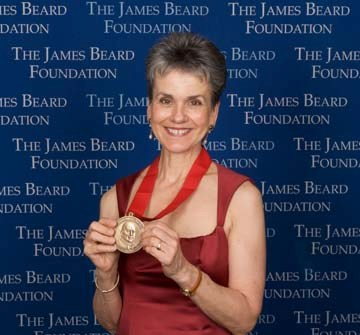
Lappé receiving the 2008 James Beard Foundation Humanitarian of the Year Award

Historian Howard Zinn wrote: "A small number of people in every generation are forerunners, in thought, action, spirit, who swerve past the barriers of greed and power to hold a torch high for the rest of us. Lappé is one of those." The Washington Post says: "Some of the twentieth century's most vibrant activist thinkers have been American women – Margaret Mead, Jeannette Rankin, Barbara Ward, Dorothy Day – who took it upon themselves to pump life into basic truths. Frances Moore Lappé is among them."

In 2008, she was honored by the James Beard Foundation as the Humanitarian of the Year. In the same year, Gourmet Magazine named Lappé among 25 people (including Thomas Jefferson, Upton Sinclair, and Julia Child), whose work has changed the way America eats. Diet for a Small Planet was selected as one of 75 Books by Women Whose Words Have Changed the World by members of the Women's National Book Association in observance of its 75th anniversary.

Lappé has received 20 honorary doctorates from distinguished institutions, including the University of Michigan, Kenyon College, Allegheny College, Lewis and Clark College, Grinnell College and University of San Francisco. In 1987 in Sweden, Lappé became the fourth American to receive the Right Livelihood Award. In 2003, she received the Rachel Carson Award from the National Nutritional Foods Association. She was selected as one of twelve living "women whose words have changed the world" by the Women's National Book Association.

== Personal life ==
Lappé's son, Anthony, is a New York City-based, award-winning media producer (Invisible Hand Media), whose work has appeared on Vice and the History Channel. Her daughter, Anna, who lives in Berkeley, California, is the author of Grub and Diet for a Hot Planet. She is the executive director of Global Alliance for the Future of Food.

== Writings ==
Frances Moore Lappé's works have been translated into 15 languages, the most recent of which is a Chinese publication of Hope's Edge.

- Diet for a Small Planet, Ballantine Books, 1971, 1975, 1982, 1991, 2021.
- Great Meatless Meals (with Ellen Buchman Ewald), Ballantine Books, 1974, 1976, 1981, 1985.
- Food First: Beyond the Myth of Scarcity (co-authored by Joseph Collins, collaboration with Cary Fowler), Houghton Mifflin, 1977, Ballantine Books, 1979.
- Mozambique and Tanzania: Asking the Big Questions (with Adele Beccar-Varela), Institute for Food and Development Policy, 1980.
- Aid as Obstacle (with Joseph Collins and David Kinley), Food First, 1980.
- Now We Can Speak (with Joseph Collins), Food First, 1982.
- What To Do After You Turn Off the T.V., Ballantine Books, 1985.
- World Hunger: Twelve Myths (with Joseph Collins), Grove Press, 1986, 1998.
- Betraying the National Interest (with Rachel Schurman and Kevin Danaher), Food First, 1987.
- Rediscovering America's Values, Ballantine Books, 1989.
- Taking Population Seriously (with Rachel Schurman), Food First, 1990.
- The Quickening of America: Rebuilding Our Nation, Remaking Our Lives (with Paul Martin Du Bois), Jossey-Bass, 1994.
- Hope's Edge: The Next Diet for a Small Planet (with Anna Lappé), Tarcher/Penguin, 2002.
- You Have the Power: Choosing Courage in a Culture of Fear (with Jeffrey Perkins), Tarcher/Penguin, 2004.
- Democracy's Edge: Choosing to Save Our Country by Bringing Democracy to Life, Jossey-Bass, 2005.
- Getting A Grip: Clarity, Creativity and Courage in a World Gone Mad, Small Planet Media, 2007, 2010.
- EcoMind: Changing the Way We Think to Create the World We Want, Small Planet Media, 2011.
- World Hunger: Ten Myths (with Joseph Collins), Grove Press, 2015.
- Daring Democracy: Igniting Power, Meaning, and Connection for the America We Want (co-authored by Adam Eichen), Beacon Press, 2017.
- It's Not Too Late: Crisis, Opportunity, and the Power of Hope, Small Planet Institute, 2021.
- Crisis of Trust: How Can Democracies Protect Against Dangerous Lies? (with Max Boland and Rachel Madison), Small Planet Institute, 2023.
