= Tre'vell Anderson =

American journalist, critic, editor, and podcaster

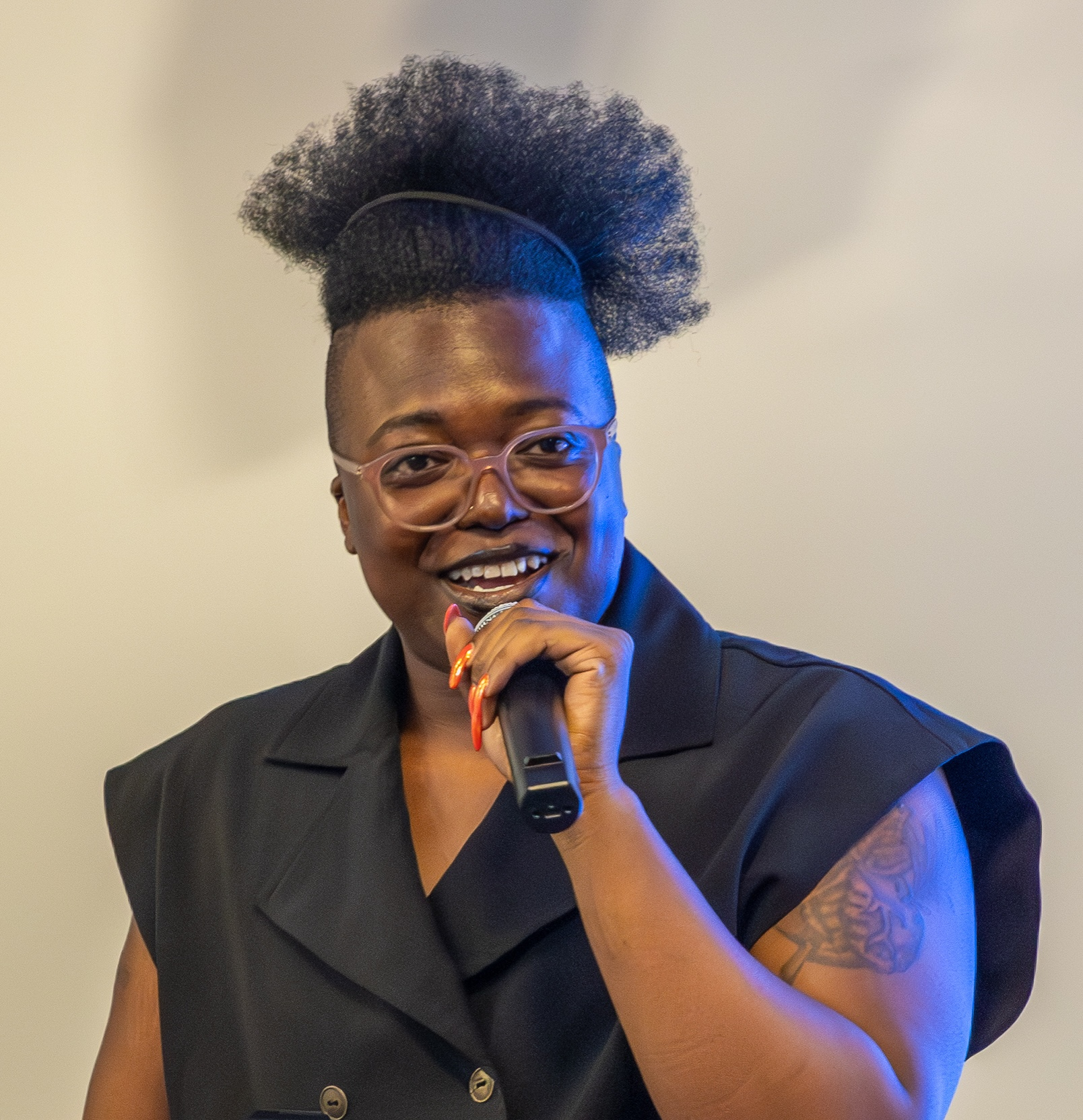
- Anderson in 2026
- Born: Charleston, South Carolina, U.S.
- Education: Morehouse College (BA); Stanford University (MA)
- Occupations: Journalist, critic, podcaster
- Years active: 2014−present
- Website: trevellanderson.com

Tre'vell Anderson is an American journalist, critic, editor, and podcaster. They previously worked for the publications Los Angeles Times, Xtra, and Out. They co-host the podcasts What A Day (Crooked Media) and FANTI (Maximum Fun). Anderson received an NAACP Image Award and two GLAAD Media Award nominations for their writing.

== Career ==
Anderson began their journalism career as a film critic for the Los Angeles Times, where they worked for four years, leaving in 2018. They later worked for Out Magazine as the director of culture and entertainment. Anderson began writing for the queer outlet Xtra Magazine in January 2020 in the role of editor-at-large.

Their writing centers issues of race, gender, the LGBTQ community, and pop culture. They have advocated for more racial diversity in LGBTQ media productions. They have provided commentary to the New York Times, NBC News, BuzzFeed News, NPR, The Daily Beast, and KJZZ. In 2021 Anderson received GLAAD Media Award nominations for two articles, "Why Billy Porter is a National Treasure" and "It’s Time for a New Tipping Point for Transgender Folks in Hollywood". Anderson was mentored by late journalist Monica Roberts.

In September 2021 Anderson joined the Hollywood Foreign Press Association's Credentials Committee, the body that selects new members.

They hosted the EW podcast Untold Stories: Beyond the Binary beginning in June 2020, which focused on nonbinary identity in culture and media. Since 2020 they have co-hosted the culture and politics podcast FANTI with Jarrett Hill, produced by Maximum Fun. As of 2022 Anderson is a co-host for the Crooked Media news podcast What A Day.

Anderson's debut book, We See Each Other: A Black, Trans Journey Through TV and Film, was released in May 2023 under Andscape Books. The book "aims to shed light on the history of trans characters on screen and advocate for greater inclusivity moving forward." They co-authored the book Historically Black Phrases with Jarrett Hill, which breaks down slang AAVE phrases.

In March 2025, Anderson was named co-executive director of the Trans Journalists Association (TJA), alongside TJA co-founder Kae Petrin.

== Personal life ==
Anderson was born and raised in Charleston, South Carolina. They received their bachelor's degree in sociology from Morehouse College and a master's degree in journalism from Stanford University.

They began to identify as gender nonconforming as an undergraduate. Anderson is nonbinary and uses they/them pronouns.

== Bibliography ==
- Anderson, Tre'Vell (2023). We See Each Other: A Black, Trans Journey Through TV and Film. Andscape Books. ISBN 9781368081733.
- Hill, Jarrett & Anderson, Tre'Vell (2023). Historically Black Phrases. Ten Speed Press. ISBN 9781984861719.

== Accolades ==
- 2020 − The Root 100 Honoree
- 2020 − NABJ Region IV Director
- 2021 − Ken Popert Media Fellow, Pink Triangle Press
- 2023 − Out 100

== Awards and nominations ==
- 2021 − Winner, Lisa Ben Award for Achievement in Features Coverage, NLGJA
- 2021 − Nominee, GLAAD Media Award for Outstanding Print Article (for "It’s Time for a New Tipping Point for Transgender Folks in Hollywood")
- 2021 − Nominee, GLAAD Media Award for Outstanding Print Article (for "Why Billy Porter is a National Treasure")
- 2024 − Winner, NAACP Image Award for Outstanding Literary Work − Instructional (for Historically Black Phrases)
