= IATP Food and Society Fellows =

The IATP Food and Society Fellows Program provides two-year, part-time fellowships to professionals working to address health, social justice, economic viability, environmental, and other issues in food and farming systems.

== History ==
The program started in 2001 as a collaboration between the Jefferson Institute and the Institute for Agriculture and Trade Policy (IATP), with the guidance and support of the W.K. Kellogg Foundation. The program is currently administered by IATP and funded by the W.K. Kellogg Foundation and the Woodcock Foundation. Generally, 8-12 fellows are selected each year; 72 fellows have been selected through 2009.

== Food and Society Fellows ==
Food and Society Fellows organized by the year of their award.

2009-2010
Elizabeth Ü, financial analyst, sustainable food system enterprises
Fred Bahnson, farmer and writer, co-founder of Anatoth Community Garden
Nicole Betancourt, social entrepreneur, co-founder of the Food Theater Project
Alethia Carr, public health administrator
Debra Eschmeyer, farmer, writer, food justice advocate with the FoodCorps
Andy Fisher, co-founder, Community Food Security Coalition
Shalini Kantayya, filmmaker, eco-activist
Erin MacDougall, healthy food specialist and scientist with the King County Food and Fitness Initiative
Sean Sellers, organizer with the Coalition of Immokalee Workers

2008-2009
Zoë Bradury, organic farmer, freelance writer
Patty Cantrell, program director, Michigan Land Use Institute
Roger Doiron, founding director, Kitchen Gardeners International
Curt Ellis, filmmaker, food advocate and co-founder and executive of FoodCorps
Jim Goodman, journalist and organic farmer
Alissa Hamilton, lawyer, author of Squeezed: What You Don't Know about Orange Juice
Rose Hayden-Smith, garden educator and historian
Arnell Hinkle, community food coach, founder of California Adolescent Nutrition and Fitness
Andrea King-Collier, freelance journalist
Lisa Kivirist, innkeeper, farmer, author of Rural Renaissance and "ECOpreneuring"
Eduardo Sanchez, public health administrator
Angela Tagtow, environmental nutrition consultant
Bryant Terry, eco-chef, author of Grub: Ideas for an Urban Organic Kitchen and Vegan Soul Kitchen
Cynthia Torres, organic farmer, co-founder of the Boulder County Food and Agriculture Policy Council

2007-2008
Thomas Dobbs, professor emeritus of economics, South Dakota State University
Anthony Flaccavento, founder, Appalachian Sustainable Development
Holly Freishtat, nutritionist, sustainable food specialist
Paul Greenberg, writer
Deborah Kane, advocate for sustainable agriculture
Preston Maring, physician, administrator, cook, advocate for farmers markets
David Mas Masamuto, organic farmer, author of Wisdom of the Last Farmer
Lorriane Stuart Merrill, dairy farmer, freelance writer
Judith Weinraub, journalist
Aimee Witteman, executive director, National Sustainable Agriculture Coalition

2004-2006
Wilbur Bullock, Jr., urban food access advocate with The Food Project
T. Susan Chang, freelance writer
Daniel Desmond, cooperative extension advisor
Johanna Divine, writer, filmmaker
Melinda Hemmelgarn, nutrition and health communications consultant
Anna Lappé, author of Hope's Edge and co-founder of Small Planet Institute
Joshua Miner, food system analyst
Jennifer Wilkins, dietician, director of the Cornell Farm to School Program

2003-2005
Curt Arens, farmer and journalist
Ann Cooper, executive chef, author of Bitter Harvest and A Woman's Place is in the Kitchen
Wylie Harris, rancher
Mary Hendrickson, rural sociologist, co-director of the Food Circles Networking Project
Rose Koenig, organic farmer
Amanda Manning, administrator and professional specializing in food, nutrition, and health
La Donna Redmond, founder, Institute for Community Resource Development
Jonathan Thomas, scholar, farmer and sustainable agriculture advocate

2002-2004
Molly Anderson, independent consultant on science and policy for social justice
Jeremy Brown, fisher
Leon Crump, administrator, Federation of Southern Cooperatives//Land Assistance Fund
George DeVault, farmer, editor, firefighter
Loni Kemp, policy analyst with The Minnesota Project
Winona LaDuke, founding director, White Earth Land Recovery Project
Michelle Mascarenhas, policy analyst, organizer
Ricardo Salvador, expert in maize physiology
Francis Thicke, dairy farmer
Amy Trubek, scholar, executive director of Vermont Fresh Network
Arlin Wasserman, vice president for corporate citizenship, Sodexo
Mark Winne, nonprofit administrator, co-founder of the national Community Food Security Coalition

2001-2003
Karen Anderson, executive director, Northeast Organic Farming Association of New Jersey
Kari Bachman, agricultural extension specialist
Claire Cummings, food and farming editor, KPFA-FM
LaVon Griffieon, farmer, co-founder 1000 Friends of Iowa
Hal Hamilton, executive director, Sustainability Institute
Keecha Harris, food systems and public health consultant
Richard Levins, professor emeritus of economics, University of Minnesota
Gloria McCutcheon, professor of entomology, specialist in environmental crop production
Anne Mosness, organizer, past president of Women's Maritime Association
Denise O'Brien, farmer and community organizer

Kyle Vickers, farmer, agri-business consultant
