= Marguerite Ross Barnett =

American academic administrator

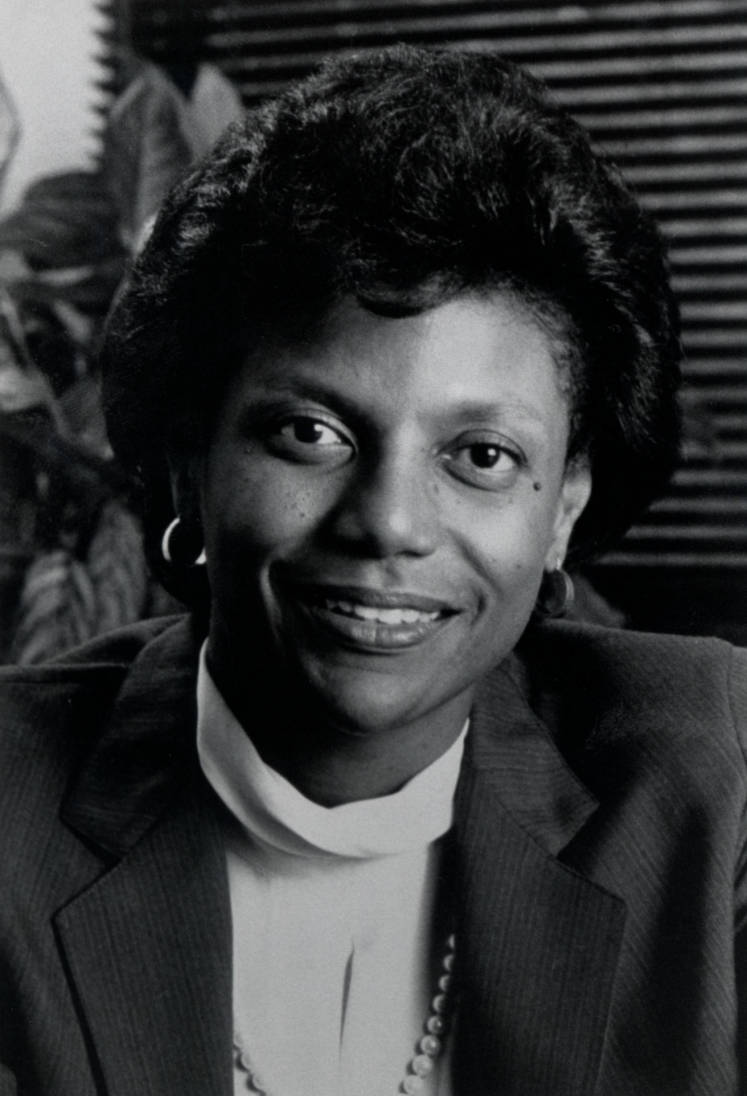

8th President of the University of Houston
- In office 1990–1992
- Preceded by: Richard L. Van Horn
- Succeeded by: James H. Pickering

Personal details
- Born: May 21, 1942 Charlottesville, Virginia, US
- Died: February 26, 1992 (aged 49) Wailuku, Hawaii, US
- Spouse(s): Stephen A. Barnett (divorced); Walter Eugene King (1980–1992)
- Children: Amy DuBois Barnett
- Parent(s): Dewey Ross; Mary Ubanks
- Education: Antioch College; University of Chicago
- Profession: Professor; President of the University of Houston; Chancellor (education)

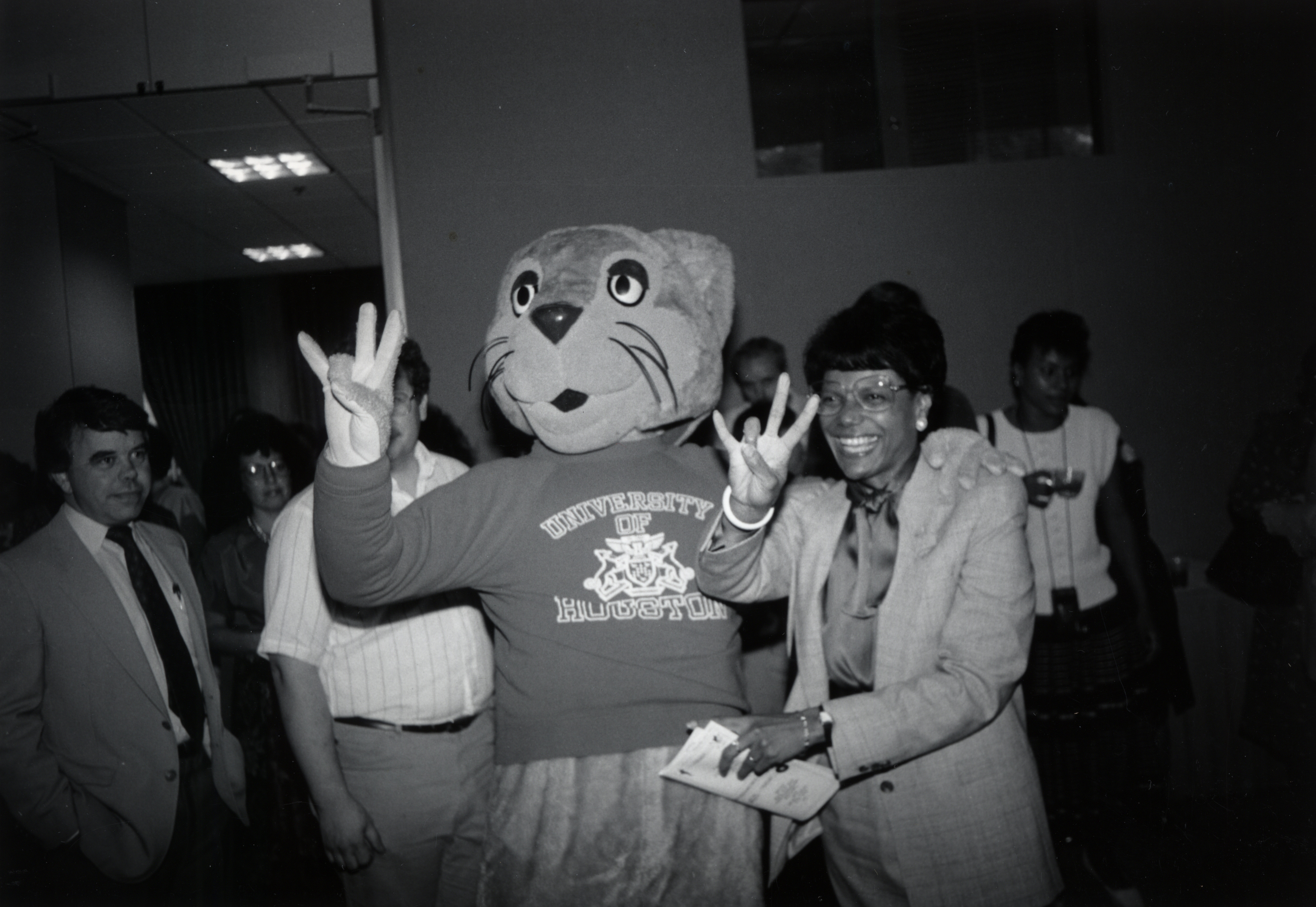
Barnett with costumed Shasta mascot

Marguerite Ross Barnett (May 21, 1942 – February 26, 1992) was the eighth president of the University of Houston and a former chancellor of the University of Missouri–St. Louis. Barnett was the first African American woman to lead a major American university.

== Overview ==
Barnett was born in Charlottesville, Virginia. She grew up in Buffalo, New York, and graduated from Bennett High School in 1959. After graduating from Antioch College in 1964, she earned a master's degree in political science and Ph.D. in political science from the University of Chicago. Barnett then taught at the University of Chicago, Princeton University, Howard University, and Columbia University.

She was vice-chancellor for academic affairs at the City University of New York from 1983 to 1986, and chancellor of the University of Missouri-St. Louis, from 1986 to 1990. Dr. Barnett then became the president of the University of Houston, from 1990 to 1992. Dr. Barnett's term came to an end on February 26, 1992, she died of cancer. Additionally, she served on the boards of the Monsanto Company, the Educational Testing Services, the Student Loan Marketing Association (SALLIE MAE), the American Council on Education, and the Committee on Economic Development. She also served on the board of directors of the Houston Grand Opera and the board of advisors of the Houston Symphony.

== Education ==
Dr. Barnett received her bachelor's degree in political science in 1964 from Antioch College, where she discovered her passion for Indian politics. She then went on to receive her master's degree in 1969, then her PhD in 1972 from the University of Chicago. During her PhD, she traveled abroad to India to do research for her dissertation. Dr. Barnett's focus was African American studies and Indian politics. While receiving her doctorate, she taught a political science course in 1969, and a lecture course in 1970. It was very uncommon in the 1960s for a major university to allow an African American woman to teach courses while receiving a PhD.

== Career ==
Once Marguerite completed her PhD and became Dr. Barnett, she began her teaching career at Princeton University. She was an assistant professor at Princeton University between the years 1970–1976. During her time at Princeton, Dr. Barnett turned her dissertation into a book that she completed in 1976. Her book The Politics of Cultural Nationalism in South India won the Political Science Associations Ethnic and Cultural Pluralism award in 1981, was published by Princeton University Press.

After her six-year stint at Princeton University, Dr. Barnett began to teach at Howard University, one of the most well-established HBCUs in the US. She stayed four years at Howard (1976-1980), where she taught political science while also serving as chair of her department between 1977-1980. Dr. Barnett also helped create the Ethnic Heritage project, which studied the history of African Americans in Gum Springs, Virginia. After her time at Howard University, she took another teaching position at Columbia University in New York, where she was a professor of political science and education from 1980-1983. She also served as a director of Columbia University's Teaching College-associated Institute for Minority and Urban Education (IMUE).

Upon leaving Columbia University, she shifted from the classroom to working in administration, and became vice-chancellor of academic affairs at the City University of New York. From 1982 to 1983, she was co-principal investigator on the Constitution and American Culture and the training program for special project directors, sponsored by the National Endowment for the Humanities. She worked at City University as vice-chancellor for three years, until she accepted a job offer from the University of Missouri–St. Louis, where she became chancellor.

Dr. Barnett was chancellor at the University of Missouri–St Louis between 1986-1990. There, she created the Bridge program, the central goal of which was to help students financially struggling in public schools to receive better educations, focusing on building the "bridge" between high school and college students–especially in science and mathematics departments. For this program, she was awarded the Anderson Medal. She also initiated seven new PhD and Master's degree programs across multiple departments. Within her first year as chancellor, Dr. Barnett doubled the amount of federal research and service grant dollars received. She did such a great job at the UMST that the New York Times credited her with "taking a sleepy campus and turning it around."

On 1 September 1990, Dr. Barnett became the first-ever African American woman president at a major university with more than 30,000 students when she became president of the University of Houston. During her first official meeting as president on 4 September 1990, she outlined seven major challenges that the University of Houston faced which she planned to address. She wanted to focus on moving the campus towards: enhanced national and international stature, maintenance of quality undergraduate instruction, community service/ community outreach, resources, diversity, democratization at the University of Houston, and quality of our environment. Dr. Barnett had three overarching principles she believed should guide campus policy: a commitment to excellence, to partner with the Houston community, and fostering a humane campus community.

Under her leadership a multitude of programs were created, the first being the Texas Center for University-School Partnership. Her first public address is when she named the plans for this program. The Texas center for University-School Partnership is an outreach program designed to assess national school reform efforts and disseminate the results of the successful programs across the country. In its first year, 37 universities across the country joined, from colleges in New York to colleges in California. She also created the Texas Center for Environmental Studies in 1991. The purpose was to address the multidisciplinary concerns for the nation's environmental needs through research, education service activities in history, law, engineering, science, business, and communications. Another notable program she contributed was the Friends of the University of Houston, created to assist in telling the story of the university to the local Houston community. This program was considered the first of its kind, due to the fact that the University of Houston's public history program had just recently been established in 1984.

Diversity was a key focus of Dr. Barnett's work with the university. She addressed this during the Black Alumni Association annual meeting in the fall of 1990; stating that diversity was a major issue in all programs, and that we should make it a priority, not let it occur "naturally". She appointed Dr. Elwyn Lee to the African American studies program with help from Dr. Elizabeth Brown-Guillory. She elected Dr. Tatcho Mindiola Jr. chair of the Mexican American studies program working to better integrate Hispanic students.

Dr. Barnett tried to implement five major pro-diversity programs:

- a business and professional leaders mentor program, where alumni and corporate leaders would work as partners with the university to mentor individual students from disadvantaged and minority backgrounds;
- a university consortium encouraging minority students to seek graduate degrees, and to provide positions for those graduates;
- a faculty mentorship program for new minority faculty members;
- a university-wide week celebrating diversity each year through student and academic programs;
- and a volunteer program bringing University of Houston faculty and students into lower-income schools and neighborhoods to work with disadvantaged youth.

During her time at the University of Houston, Dr. Barnett raised over 350 million dollars in funds in less than two years. She also received the largest donation in not only the University of Houston's history, but of any public university at the time: $51.4 million from John and Rebecca Moore.

Though most known for the Bridge program and the Texas Center for University-School Partnership, Dr. Barnett served in many different educational and charitable organizations. She was on the board for the Monsanto Company, the Educational testing service, the National Student Loan Marketing Association, the Houston Grand Opera, the advisory board for the Houston Symphony, the American Council on Education, the Board of Union Electric, the St. Louis Symphony, the St. Louis Arts and Education Council, the and St. Louis Civic. Dr. Barnett was also a member of professional associations in political science, South Asian studies, the Overseas Development Council, the Council on Foreign Relations, and the Cleaved council; and was the trustee of the Committee for Economic Development. She was also appointed President's Commission on Environmental Quality by President George H. W. Bush.

== Awards won ==
List of awards Dr. Barnett received from 1964 to 1990:

- Samuel Stouffer Fellowship (1964)
- National opinion research center fellowship(1965)
- Committee on Southern Asian studies fellowship (1966)
- Committee for the study of comparative politics fellowship (1967)
- Princeton University faculty research grant (1970)
- James Madison Bicentennial preceptor at Princeton University Distinguished Research and scholarship (1976)
- American Political Science Association ethnic and cultural pluralism award for best scholarly work in political science (Best book) (1981)
- Bethune-Tubman-Truth Women of the Year Award (1983)
- Association of Black Women in Higher Education Award for Educational Excellence (1986)
- American Political Science COBPS Award for Excellence in Scholarship and Service to the Profession (1986)
- Golden GAZELLE Award from the Project on Equal Education of the NOW Legal Defense Fund (1987)
- Award of Achievement, Jefferson City NAACP (1988)
- The St. Louis Variety Club named Marguerite Barnett "Woman of the Year" (1989)
- The Women's International Leadership Forum presented her with the Woman Who Has Made a Difference Award (1990)

== Legacy ==
Dr. Barnett was the first African American woman to become president at a major institution with over 30,000 students. In a study done by two students at the University of Nebraska–Lincoln, there were over forty female African American college presidents between 1992 and 2002. Prior to this, there were only twenty-three African American female college presidents between 1900 and 1991.

She fell ill with a blood disorder involving hypoglycemia and metastatic cancer, which caused her to take a leave of absence and travel to Wailuku, Hawaii in January 1992. Dr. Marguerite Ross Barnett died on Wednesday, February 26, 1992.

The day of her death, the University of Houston released two statements. The first statement, written by Chancellor Alexander F. Schilt, praised Dr. Barnett for the resources, habits, and programs she created that would continue to benefit the future of the university. The second statement, written by James H. Pickering (the acting university president), addressed Dr. Barnett's vision for education and her impacts on the university, and included details of her memorial service on Sunday, March 1, 1992 held at Cullen Performance Hall. President George H. W. Bush wrote to her husband Walter E. King, saying: "Marguerite was a dedicated servant to the University of Houston, to her community, and to her country. She was very special, and she will be missed". King read Bush's words at her memorial at Cullen Hall.

At UMSL she is remembered by the Barnett scholarship, named in her memory, the goal of which is to help students in the Bridge program complete their graduate degrees. Although this is the only program that is still active, she was instrumental in shaping the University of Houston into one of the most diversely-populated universities in the US. Dr. Barnett has two plaques in her memory, one is at the University of Houston near Cullen Hall, the other at the University of Missouri St. Louis.

== Publications ==
Throughout Barnett's career, she published many articles focusing on the intersection between race and politics. A large focus of her writing is focused on the experiences of African American politicians. In 1980, she published "Afro-American Politics and Public Policy Priorities in the 1980s", covering the importance of Black leaders' roles in reconstructing foreign and domestic policies, specifically concerned with potential consequences for African Americans as a result of these policies and international relations.

A notable portion of her work covers the Congressional Black Caucus (CBC), which represents African American members in the US House of Representatives. "The Congressional Black Caucus: Symbol, Myth, and Reality" (1975) discusses the power and obligations of political black institutions, suggesting black politicians strive to pass legislation with both personal ideology and best interest of the racialized individuals they are representing be kept in mind. In a similar article, "The Congressional Black Caucus" (1977), she describes the expansion of the CBC, arguing that the main contributors in the formation of this group is the emphasis of Black representation in electoral politics and President Nixon's political climate.

Dr. Barnett spent a lot of time researching the progress of African Americans in America, particularly the development of equitable racial policies. Her book Public Policy for the Black Community: Strategies and Perspectives (1976), co-written with economist James A. Hefner, analyzes the effects of political strategies on Black Americans in the Southern United States and within urban ghettos. Public Policy for the Black Community argues that the concept of significant, progressive and mainstream inclusion of Black people in the US is a myth, due to the many race-based injustices still taking place.

During the 1980s, she worked to strategize ways to increase numbers of Black politicians within the US. Her 1984 article, "The Strategic Debate over a Black Presidential Candidacy" contemplates the possibility of an African American featured on a future presidential ballot. With the secondary goal of expanding black voter registration, Dr. Barnett theorizes about the impacts of a presidential nominee who can better represent the morals and backgrounds of minority voters.

Preceded by Arnold Grobman	Chancellor of the University of Missouri–St. Louis; 1986–1990	Succeeded by Blanche Touhill
