= Sustainable Agriculture Research and Education Program =

The Sustainable Agriculture Research and Education (SARE)' Program is a US based competitive grants and education program administered through the United States Department of Agriculture’s (USDA) National Institute of Food and Agriculture (NIFA), and run by four regional councils that set policy and make grants. The four regions, North Central, Northeast, South and West, are each guided by a volunteer Administrative Council that sets regional priorities. These councils include farmers and ranchers, representatives from universities, government, agribusiness and nonprofit organizations. Since 1988, SARE has invested around $200 million in more than 5,000 initiatives. New York has had the most funded SARE projects, followed by Pennsylvania, Minnesota, and Wisconsin. Every US state has had at least 10 SARE grants since the program's inception.

== History ==
SARE is supported by the National Institute of Food and Agriculture (NIFA), U.S. Department of Agriculture (USDA). It was initially authorized as the Low-Input Sustainable Agriculture (LISA) Program in the Food Security Act of 1985. In 1990, the Food, Agriculture, Conservation and Trade Act (FACTA) changed the name of the program and authorized the programs governing structure of regional Administrative Councils and host institutions. Congress determined it should be funded at no less than $60 million a year, as per the recommendations of the National Academy of Sciences. However, annual appropriations have yet to reach this level, and are currently less than half. The 2014 Farm Bill did not modify the substance of the SARE program, but determined that the program will now have to be reauthorized in future farm bills, beginning in 2018. The 2014 Agriculture Appropriations Act consolidated funding for the SARE Professional Development Program (PDP) and the SARE Research and Education (R&E) grants into a single item. This means that funding decisions regarding how much of the total should go towards each of these program components is now left up to USDA, rather than Congress.

== See also ==
- Sustainable agriculture
