= Joy M. Scott-Carrol =

Corporate executive officer, professor and mentor

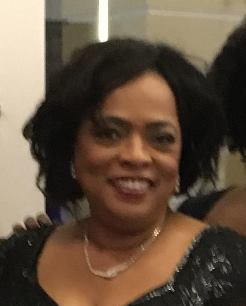
- Scott-Carrol at the 48th NAACP Image Awards in Pasadena, 2017
- Education: Creighton University; University of Wisconsin; Loyola University
- Occupations: University Professor and Higher Education Administration; Author
- Known for: Book - Running the Long Race in Gifted Education: Narratives and Interviews from Culturally Diverse Gifted Adults; International Gifted Education
- Spouse: Paul C. Carrol
- Children: 1 Daughter, 1 Stepson, 1 Granddaughter, 1 Grandson
- Website: www.iget-network.org/about-us/our-leadership/

Joy M. Scott-Carrol, is a corporate executive officer, professor and mentor at the International Gifted Education Teacher-Development Network (IGET-Network, LLC, founded in South Africa, 2006) and formerly visiting scholar and professor in the School of Education at the University of the Witwatersrand, Gauteng, South Africa.

Joy Scott-Carrol graduated from Chicago Public Schools; Creighton University-Omaha (B.S., Psychology-1976); University of Wisconsin-Platteville (M.S.Ed., Counseling Education-1980); Loyola University-Chicago (Ph.D.), Higher Education Administration/Educational Leadership and Policy Studies, with a concentration in Educational Research/Gifted Education (1996).

Joy's book, Running the Long Race in Gifted Education: Narratives and Interviews from Culturally Diverse Gifted Adults (BPN, IGet-Network Press, 2016), was nominated for an NAACP Image Award for Outstanding Literary Work – Instructional.

== Career ==
=== Teaching ===
Dr. Scott-Carrol (retired and visiting professor) has taught graduate level courses covering the historical, philosophical and practical aspects of identifying and servicing culturally diverse gifted learners, at Wits School of Education - University of the Witwatersrand, Johannesburg, South Africa. While working under the direction and tutelage of Dr. Paula Olszewski-Kubilius at the Center for Talent Development Northwestern University, Joy successfully implemented and managed the center's grant funded NU-Horizons Counseling Program for Economically Disadvantaged College-Bound Gifted Students. Her career also includes:

- College and University Professor (16 years, ongoing)
- Primary School Music Teacher (6 years)
- Contractual Family Therapist (5 years)
- College Counselor (7 years)
- U.S. Department of Education Grants Program Director (7 years)
- Assistant Academic V.P. for Academic Affairs (2.5 years)

=== Writing ===
Throughout Dr. Scott-Carrol's career she has been studying the educational research literature on culturally diverse and economically disadvantaged gifted children. Her article, “South African Educators Perspectives on Barriers to Identifying Black and Second Language Learners as Gifted” is published by the International Journal on Learning, 2008. Since 1988 she has presented topical papers in the gifted education field at national and international conferences.

Scott-Carrol's book, Running the Long Race in Gifted Education:Narratives and Interviews from Culturally Diverse Gifted Adults (BPN, IGet-Network Press, 2016), co-authored with former Whitney Young Magnet High School (Chicago) student and mentee, currently successful Hollywood writer, Dr. Anthony Sparks ( Foreword by Diana Slaughter Kotzin), was the culmination of her academic career and lifelong individual creativity. The book contains a set of narratives and interviews about how culturally diverse gifted adults interpret growing up as gifted children, and how they navigated their lives, and it questioned the impact opportunities in gifted and talented programs made on their individual their lives. The diverse perspectives represented in the book include a range of demographic categories: racially, ethnically, and regionally.

== Awards and honors ==
Latest---2017 48th NAACP Image Awards Nomination for Outstanding Literary Work – Instructional
