= Amy DuBois Barnett =

American magazine editor (born 1969)

- Born: 1969 (age 56–57); Hyde Park, Chicago, United States
- Education: Brown University; University College Dublin; Columbia University
- Occupation: Magazine editor
- Known for: First African-American woman to run a major magazine in the U.S.
- Parent(s): Stephen A. Barnett and Marguerite Ross Barnett

Amy DuBois Barnett (born 1969) is an American magazine editor. She was formerly editor-in-chief of Ebony magazine. Barnett was also the editor-in-chief of Honey and Teen People magazines, and the deputy editor of Harper's Bazaar. She was the first African-American woman to run a major mainstream magazine in the United States. Barnett is also a fiction writer with several published short stories. In 2008, she published an NAACP Image Award-nominated advice book for women: Get Yours! How to Have Everything You Ever Dreamed of and More (Random House).

== Early life ==
Barnett was born in Hyde Park, Chicago, to Stephen and Marguerite Ross Barnett, the first black woman to head a major research university. She attended Brown University as an undergraduate where she joined Delta Sigma Theta sorority and studied French and political science. then worked briefly in finance before enrolling at Parsons for a certificate in fashion merchandising. She worked at Lord & Taylor before moving to Ireland to study writing and literature at University College Dublin. She then attended Columbia University for an MFA in creative writing.

== Career ==
While at Columbia University, Barnett wrote for a website called Fashion Planet, which became the magazine Fashion Almanac. Initially interested in going into the fashion industry, the experience shaped Barnett's interest in journalism, and Barnett became Fashion Almanac's managing editor.

After earning her MFA, Barnett served as lifestyle editor at Essence magazine before joining Honey magazine as editor-in-chief in 2000. In 2003, she joined Time Inc. as managing editor of Teen People where she became the first African-American editor-in-chief of a "mainstream consumer magazine[s]." She then became the deputy editor of Harper’s Bazaar before joining Ebony as editor-in-chief in 2010.

While at Ebony, Barnett led the magazine's first redesign in its 66-year history. In 2011, Barnett joined the board of the American Society of Magazine Editors and served for three consecutive terms. For her work at Ebony as well as her other editing positions, Barnett received eight Salute to Excellence Awards in 2012, as well as the Media Executive of the Year in 2012 by Target Market News.

In April 2014, Barnett left Ebony. Shortly thereafter, she was announced as executive editor for The Undefeated, then a still-forthcoming ESPN sports and culture website focused on African-American audiences, led by Jason Whitlock. In 2017, Barnett joined TheGrio as executive vice president, digital and chief content officer. In 2019, Barnett left TheGrio to join BET as senior vice president and general manager of BET Digital.

=== Books ===
- Get Yours! How to Have Everything You Ever Dreamed of and More (Random House), 2007
- If I Ruled The World (Flatiron Books), 2026

=== Selected publications ===
- "Do Not Uncover Buried Things" Obsidian III, Vol. 1 No. 1 1999
- "Mirror Image" in Gumbo: A Celebration of African American Writing (Anthology), edited by Marita Golden, 2002
- "What Are You, Anyway?" The Brown Reader: 50 Writers Remember College Hill, 2014
