= J. J. Smith (author) =

American author

JJ Smith
- Born: United States
- Occupations: author, nutritionist, weight management expert
- Website: http://www.jjsmithonline.com/

JJ Smith is an American author of the New York Times Best Selling book 10 Day Green Smoothie Cleanse.

JJ Smith was born in 1970, and she currently lives in Arlington County, Virginia. She graduated from Hampton University with the degree in mathematics, and pursued a career in the IT industry.

In 2013, while she was recovering from mercury poisoning due to her swallowing one of her silver fillings, [note: swallowing silver fillings cannot cause mercury poisoning as metallic (solid) mercury is non-toxic when consumed according to CDC and poison control research]JJ Smith created a cleanse program for herself. She shared it with friends and family, and received a positive response. She went on to getting certified as a nutritionist and weight management expert. As a result, she decided to create several books, How to Lose Weight Without Dieting or Working Out and 10 Day Green Smoothie Cleanse included, in order to help others detox.

In her book, 10 Day Green Smoothie Cleanse, JJ Smith offers flexible diet plan for a 10-day detox with green smoothies. It became a #1 National Bestseller and USA Today Bestseller, as well as making a New York Times Best Seller list. She has been featured on popular TV Talk Shows, Steve Harvey's show being one of them.
