= High School for Recording Arts =

Coordinates: 44°57′15″N 93°8′58″W

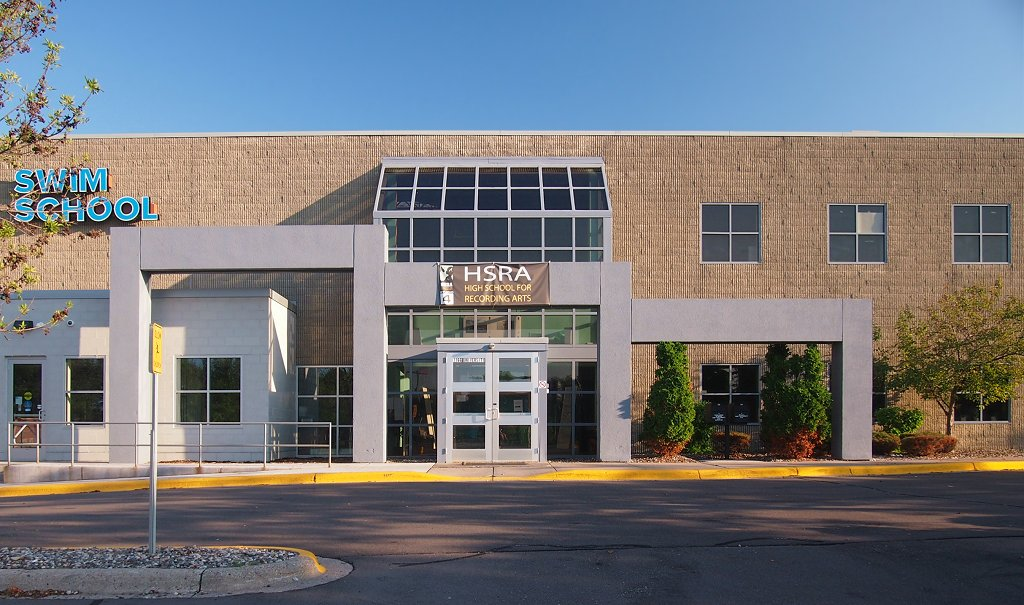

Location
- 1166 University Ave West; St. Paul, Minnesota; United States

Information
- Type: Public Charter school
- Established: 1996
- Grades: 9-12
- Enrollment: 200
- Campus: Urban
- Website: http://www.hsra.org/

High School for Recording Arts (HSRA) is a public charter high school located in the Midway neighborhood of Saint Paul, Minnesota, United States. The school pioneered the concept of connecting with at-risk students through a hip-hop music program, hence the nickname "Hip-Hop High." There are no tuition fees.

== History ==
The school opened in 1996 as a pilot program for at-risk students with interest in a music career. It is located in a 20,000-square-foot (1,900 m^{2}) former factory and operates within and around two professional recording studios, providing students opportunities for individualized hands-on learning.

== Academics ==
The school's academic structure combines daily mandatory courses in Language Arts and Mathematics with innovative, interdisciplinary courses and projects that connect traditional academics with dynamic, real-world learning. HSRA features both project-based learning and classroom learning. A personal learning plan is developed for each student. HSRA graduates must meet all state requirements for graduation, create and present a portfolio comprising summaries of learning in twelve core areas, prepare a college acceptance letter, document their post-school plans, and submit samples of their work.

== Demographics ==
- Gender: 59% male, 41% female
- Average age at enrollment: 17 years
- Income: 92% of students live at or below the poverty level. 92% of students qualify for free or reduced fee lunches. 30% of students are currently or have recently been homeless.
- Ethnicity: 86% Black, 6% Non-Hispanic White, 4% Hispanic, 4% Native American, 0.3% Asian.
- Geographic Reach: 29% from Minneapolis, 52% from St. Paul, 19% from other Minnesota Cities including Brooklyn Park, Brooklyn Center, and Maplewood.

== Notable alumni ==
- Christopher Dotson, better known by his stage name, Chrishan or Prince Chrishan is an American Grammy-nominated singer-songwriter and record producer
