= 39th NAACP Image Awards =

2008 media and literature awards

- Date: February 14, 2008
- Site: Shrine Auditorium, Los Angeles, California
- Hosted by: D. L. Hughley
- Official website: NAACPImageAwards.net

Highlights
- Best Picture: The Great Debaters
- Best Comedy Series: Tyler Perry's House of Payne
- Best Drama Series: Grey's Anatomy

Television coverage
- Network: Fox

The 39th NAACP Image Awards, presented by the NAACP, honored outstanding representations and achievements of people of color in motion pictures, television, music, and literature during the 2007 calendar year. The ceremony was hosted by comedian D. L. Hughley and aired on February 14, 2008, on Fox.

== Nominations ==
The nominations were announced on January 8, 2008, at The Beverly Hilton Hotel by Richard T. Jones, Kevin Frazier, Mara Brock Akil, Dennis Hayes and awards chair Clayola Brown. The Great Debaters received the most nominations in the Motion Picture categories with a total of eight.

All nominees are listed below, with the winners listed first in boldface.

== Special awards ==
Hall of Fame Inductee	Chairman's Award	Vanguard Award	President's Award (Note: Although there is no mention of a President's Award for this year on the official NAACP Image Awards website, nor in any archived press releases from that period, many online sources from 2014 state that Donald Sterling received the President's Award in either 2008 or 2009. It is unclear if this was an award from a local chapter or a national Image Award.)
**Stevie Wonder**	**Ruby Dee**	**Aretha Franklin**	**Donald Sterling**

== Motion Picture ==
Outstanding Motion Picture	Outstanding Directing in a Motion Picture
**The Great Debaters**; American Gangster; I Am Legend; Talk To Me; Tyler Perry's Why Did I Get Married?	**Kasi Lemmons – Talk To Me**; Denzel Washington – The Great Debaters; Preston Whitmore – This Christmas; Sunu Gonera – Pride; Sylvain White – Stomp the Yard
Outstanding Actor in a Motion Picture	Outstanding Actress in a Motion Picture
**Denzel Washington** **– The Great Debaters**; Columbus Short – Stomp The Yard; Don Cheadle – Talk To Me; Terrence Howard – Pride; Will Smith – I Am Legend	**Jurnee Smollett – The Great Debaters**; Angelina Jolie – A Mighty Heart; Halle Berry – Things We Lost in the Fire; Jill Scott – Tyler Perry's Why Did I Get Married?; Taraji P. Henson – Talk To Me
Outstanding Supporting Actor in a Motion Picture	Outstanding Supporting Actress in a Motion Picture
**Denzel Whitaker – The Great Debaters**; Chiwetel Ejiofor – Talk To Me; Forest Whitaker – The Great Debaters; Nate Parker – The Great Debaters; Tyler Perry – Tyler Perry's Why Did I Get Married?	**Janet Jackson – Tyler Perry's Why Did I Get Married?**; Loretta Devine – This Christmas; Meagan Good – Stomp The Yard; Queen Latifah – Hairspray; Ruby Dee – American Gangster
Outstanding Writing in a Motion Picture	Outstanding Independent or Foreign Motion Picture
**Michael Genet and Rick Famuyiwa – Talk To Me**; John Sayles – Honeydripper; Richard LaGravenese – Freedom Writers; Robert Eisele – The Great Debaters; Steve Zaillian – American Gangster	**Honeydripper**; A Mighty Heart; Dirty Laundry; My Brother; Persepolis

== Television series and streaming ==
=== Drama ===
Outstanding Drama Series
**Grey's Anatomy**; House; K-Ville; Lincoln Heights; The Unit
Outstanding Actor in a Drama Series	Outstanding Actress in a Drama Series
**Hill Harper – CSI: NY**; Anthony Anderson – K-Ville; Dennis Haysbert – The Unit; Jesse L. Martin – Law & Order; Jimmy Smits – Cane	**Regina Taylor – The Unit**; CCH Pounder – The Shield; Jennifer Beals – The L Word; Nicki Micheaux – Lincoln Heights; Wendy Davis – Army Wives
Outstanding Supporting Actor in a Drama Series	Outstanding Supporting Actress in a Drama Series
**Omar Epps – House**; Blair Underwood – Dirty Sexy Money; James Pickens Jr. – Grey's Anatomy; Mekhi Phifer – ER; Taye Diggs – Private Practice	**Chandra Wilson – Grey's Anatomy**; Audra McDonald – Private Practice; Marianne Jean-Baptiste – Without A Trace; Pam Grier – The L Word; S. Epatha Merkerson – Law & Order
Outstanding Actor in a Daytime Drama Series	Outstanding Actress in a Daytime Drama Series
**Kristoff St. John – The Young And The Restless**; Bryton McClure – The Young And The Restless; Kamar de los Reyes – One Life to Live; Mykel Shannon Jenkins – The Bold and the Beautiful; Tobias Truvillion – One Life to Live	**Christel Khalil – The Young And The Restless**; Brook Kerr – Passions; Nazanin Boniadi – General Hospital; Tika Sumpter – One Life to Live; Tracey Ross – Passions
Outstanding Writing in a Drama Series	Outstanding Directing in a Drama Series
**Shonda Rhimes and Krista Vernoff – Grey's Anatomy: "A Change is Gonna Come"**; Janine Sherman Barrois – ER: "Breach of Trust"; Kathleen McGhee-Anderson and Anthony Sparks – Lincoln Heights: "The Vision"; Natalie Chaidez – Heroes: "The Fix"; Shonda Rhimes – Private Practice: "In Which We Meet Addison, A Nice Girl From Somewhere Else"	**Seith Mann – Friday Night Lights: "Are You Ready For Friday Night?"**; Darnell Martin – Law & Order: Criminal Intent: "Bombshell"; Kevin Hooks – Lincoln Heights: "Pilot"; Paris Barclay – CSI: Crime Scene Investigation: "Meet Market"; Roxanne Dawson – Heroes: "Run"

=== Comedy ===
Outstanding Comedy Series
**Tyler Perry's House of Payne**; 30 Rock; Everybody Hates Chris; Girlfriends; Ugly Betty
Outstanding Actor in a Comedy Series	Outstanding Actress in a Comedy Series
**LaVan Davis – Tyler Perry's House of Payne**; Donald Faison – Scrubs; Dulé Hill – Psych; Reggie Hayes – Girlfriends; Tyler James Williams – Everybody Hates Chris	**America Ferrera – Ugly Betty**; Golden Brooks – Girlfriends; Tia Mowry – The Game; Tichina Arnold – Everybody Hates Chris; Tracee Ellis Ross – Girlfriends
Outstanding Supporting Actor in a Comedy Series	Outstanding Supporting Actress in a Comedy Series
**Lance Gross – Tyler Perry's House of Payne**; Blair Underwood – The New Adventures of Old Christine; Romany Malco – Weeds; Terry Crews – Everybody Hates Chris; Tracy Morgan – 30 Rock	**Vanessa L. Williams – Ugly Betty**; Keesha Sharp – Girlfriends; Tonye Patano – Weeds; Vivica A. Fox – Curb Your Enthusiasm; Wendy Raquel Robinson – The Game
Outstanding Writing in a Comedy Series	Outstanding Directing in a Comedy Series
**Ali LeRoi – Everybody Hates Chris: "Everybody Hates Guidance Counselor"**; Karen Gist – Girlfriends: "Spree To Be Free"; Mindy Kaling – The Office: "Branch Wars"; Sara Finney-Johnson – The Game: "The Big Chill"; Silvio Horta – Ugly Betty: "A Nice Day for a Posh Wedding"	**Ken Whittingham – The Office: "Phyllis' Wedding"**; Ali LeRoi – Everybody Hates Chris: "Everybody Hates Baseball"; Millicent Shelton – Everybody Hates Chris: "Everybody Hates the Substitute"; Salim Akil – Girlfriends: "To Be Determined" and "It’s Been Determined"; Seith Mann – Entourage: "The Dream Team"

=== Television movie, limited-series or dramatic special ===
Outstanding Television Movie, Mini-Series or Dramatic Special
**Life Support**; The Bronx is Burning; Bury My Heart at Wounded Knee; Five Days; The List
Outstanding Actor in a Television Movie, Mini-Series or Dramatic Special	Outstanding Actress in a Television Movie, Mini-Series or Dramatic Special
**Wendell Pierce – Life Support**; Adam Beach – Bury My Heart at Wounded Knee; Daniel Sunjata – The Bronx is Burning; Evan Ross – Life Support; Wayne Brady – The List	**Queen Latifah – Life Support**; Anika Noni Rose – The Starter Wife; Holly Robinson Peete – Matters of Life and Dating; S. Epatha Merkerson – Girl, Positive; Sydney Tamiia Poitier – The List

=== Other ===
Outstanding News/Information – Series or Special	Outstanding Talk (Series)
**In Conversation: The Senator Barack Obama Interview**; American Gangster; American Morning: MLK Papers; Dr. Sonja Gupta: Saving Your Life; Good Morning America: Breast Cancer Mission	**Tavis Smiley: 'Crisis in Darfur'**; Judge Mathis; Our World with Black Enterprise; Real Time with Bill Maher; The Tyra Banks Show
Outstanding Reality Series	Outstanding Variety – Series or Special
**Run's House 4**; American Idol; America's Next Top Model; Dancing with the Stars; Extreme Makeover: Home Edition	**Celebration of Gospel '07**; 2007 VH1 Hip-Hop Honors; An Evening of Stars: Tribute to Aretha Franklin; BET Awards; Russell Simmons Presents Def Poetry
Outstanding Children's Program	Outstanding Performance by a Youth (Series, Special, Television Movie or Limited-series)
**That's So Raven**; Cory in the House; Dora the Explorer; Go, Diego, Go!; High School Musical 2	**Raven-Symoné – That's So Raven**; Andre Benjamin – Class of 3000; Kathleen Herles – Dora the Explorer; Kyle Massey – Cory in the House; Lil' JJ – Just Jordan
Outstanding Documentary (Theatrical or Television)	
**Darfur Now**; Bastards of the Party; Desert Bayou; Price of Sugar; Sicko	

== Recording ==
Outstanding Album	Outstanding New Artist
**Alicia Keys – As I Am**; Chris Brown – Exclusive; Kanye West – Graduation; Mary J. Blige – Growing Pains; Seal – System	**Jordin Sparks**; Chrisette Michele; Corbin Bleu; J. Holiday; Sean Kingston
Outstanding Male Artist	Outstanding Female Artist
**Chris Brown**; Common; Kanye West; Prince; Seal	**Alicia Keys**; Aretha Franklin; Beyoncé; Jill Scott; Mary J. Blige
Outstanding Song	Outstanding Duo, Group or Collaboration
**Like You’ll Never See Me Again – Alicia Keys**; Beautiful Flower – India Arie; Just Fine – Mary J. Blige; Stronger – Kanye West; Umbrella – Rihanna feat. Jay-Z	**Eddie Levert and Gerald Levert**; Aretha Franklin (feat. Fantasia); Bow Wow and Omarion; Sounds of Blackness; Stephen Marley and Damian "Jr. Gong" Marley
Outstanding Music Video	Outstanding World Music Album
**Like You’ll Never See Me Again** **– Alicia Keys**; Beautiful Liar – Beyoncé; Just Fine – Mary J. Blige; Show Me – John Legend; Stronger – Kanye West	**Angelique Kidjo – Djin Djin**; Habib Koité – Afriki; Various Artists – Putumayo Presents: World Hits; Shiko Mawatu – Kimbanda Nzila; Youssou N'Dour – Rokku Mi Rokka
Outstanding Gospel Artist (Traditional or Contemporary)	Outstanding Jazz Artist
**Kirk Franklin**; Marvin Winans; Mavis Staples; Sounds of Blackness; Yolanda Adams	**Herbie Hancock**; Dee Dee Bridgewater; Kirk Whalum; Patti Austin; Randy Crawford and Joe Sample

== Literature ==
Outstanding Literary Work – Fiction	Outstanding Literary Work – Nonfiction
**Blonde Faith – Walter Mosley**; The Brief Wondrous Life of Oscar Wao – Junot Diaz; Cion: A Novel – Zakes Mda; Knots – Nuruddin Farah; New England White: A Novel – Stephen L. Carter	**Not on Our Watch: The Mission to End Genocide in Darfur and Beyond – Don Cheadle and John Prendergast**; An Unbroken Agony – Randall Robinson; Brother, I’m Dying – Edwidge Danticat; Know What I Mean?: Reflections on Hip-Hop – Michael Eric Dyson; Race and Racism in the Chinas: Chinese Racial Attitudes Toward Africans and African-Americans – M. Dujon Johnson
Outstanding Literary Work – Debut Author	Outstanding Literary Work – Biography/Auto-Biography
**The Women Who Raised Me: A Memoir – Victoria Rowell**; The Beautiful Things That Heaven Bears – Dinaw Mengestu; Grace Will Lead Me Home – Robin Givens; Like Trees, Walking – Ravi Howard; A Long Way Gone: Memoirs of a Boy Soldier – Ishmael Beah	**Obama: From Promise to Power – David Mendell**; I Got Your Back: A Father and Son Keep it Real About Love, Fatherhood, Family, and Friendship – Eddie Levert Sr., Gerald Levert and Lyah Leflore; My Grandfather's Son – Clarence Thomas; Silent Gesture: The Autobiography of Tommie Smith – Tommie Smith and David Steele; The Women Who Raised Me: A Memoir – Victoria Rowell
Outstanding Literary Work – Instructional	Outstanding Literary Work – Poetry
**The Covenant in Action – Tavis Smiley**; Do You!: 12 Laws to Access the Power in You to Achieve Happiness and Success – Russell Simmons; Get Yours!: The Girlfriends’ Guide to Having Everything You Ever Dreamed of and More – Amy Dubois Barnett; Reposition Yourself: Living Life Without Limits – T. D. Jakes; This Year You Write Your Novel – Walter Mosley	**Acolytes: Poems – Nikki Giovanni**; Duende – Tracy K. Smith; Eloquence: Rhythm and Renaissance – Usi Ku; Quiver of Arrows – Carl Phillips; Selected Poems – Derek Walcott
Outstanding Literary Work – Children	Outstanding Literary Work – Youth/Teens
**Nothing but Trouble: The Story of Althea Gibson – Sue Stauffacher (Author); Greg Couch (Illustrator)**; A Friendship for Today – Patricia C. McKissack; Elijah of Buxton – Christopher Paul Curtis; Let it Shine: Three Favorite Spirituals – Ashley Bryan; Young Pele: Soccer's First Star – Lesa Cline-Ransome (Author); James Ransome (Illustrator)	**More Than Entertainers: An Inspirational Black Career Guide – Charles B. Schooler (Author); Gary Young (Illustrator)**; Body Drama – Nancy Redd; Center for Cartoon Studies Presents: Satchel Paige: Striking Out Jim Crow – James Sturm (Author); Rich Tommaso (Illustrator); Divine Confidential – Jacquelin Thomas; The Shadow Speaker – Nnedi Okorafor-Mbachu
