= Laura Chapman Hruska =

American novelist

- Born: Laura Mae Chapman; October 14, 1935; The Bronx
- Died: January 9, 2010 (aged 74)
- Education: Cornell University, Yale Law School
- Spouse: Alan Hruska

Laura Chapman Hruska (October 14, 1935 – January 9, 2010) was an American lawyer, novelist, and co-founder and editor in chief of the Soho Press.

== Life ==
Laura Mae Chapman was born in The Bronx, and was raised in Manhattan. After graduating from Cornell University, she attended Yale Law School. After a short career as an attorney, she quit to start a family and focus on writing. She published three novels (as Laura Chapman). In 1986, she, her husband, Alan Hruska, and their friend, Juris Jurjevics, the former editor in chief of the Dial Press, founded Soho Press with the objective of publishing serious literature by authors who had yet to be discovered. The publishing house is unusual in accepting—and actually reading—unsolicited works.

One of Soho Press's notable discoveries was Breath, Eyes, Memory by the then-unknown Haitian-born author Edwidge Danticat. In 1994, the company started the Soho Crime imprint dedicated to mysteries with foreign settings. In 2008, it forged a partnership with Constable & Robinson to publish British crime fiction in the United States.

Hruska died on January 9, 2010, of cancer, aged 74, in Manhattan. She was survived by her husband, three children, six grandchildren and her sister.
