= Krik? Krak! =

Short story collection by Haitian-American Edwidge Danticat

- First edition (publ. Soho Press)
- Author: Edwidge Danticat
- Language: English
- Genre: Historical fiction
- Publisher: Soho Press
- Publication date: April 10, 1995
- Publication place: United States of America
- Pages: 224
- ISBN: 0-679-76657-X

Krik? Krak! (1995) is a historical and postcolonial short story collection by Haitian-American writer Edwidge Danticat, consisting of nine short stories plus an epilogue. The collection is written mostly from the perspective of different female narrators living in Haiti and in New York City. The book follows these characters as they deal with the loss, separation and trauma resulting from Haiti's colonial history, the mass killings of Haitians during the Parsley Massacre in 1937 and the oppression of the Duvalier regime. The epilogue ties the stories together through the narrator's reflections that every Haitian woman's story is connected and is carried on by new generations. The book was finalist for the National Book Award for fiction in 1995.

== Title of the book ==
The title of the book is a Haitian Creole term referring to the Haitian tradition of call and response storytelling inherited from their African ancestors. In the first short story, one person explains the tradition as "Someone says, Krik? You answer, Krak! And they say, I have many stories I could tell you, and then they go on and tell these stories to you, but mostly to themselves".

== Plot ==
Krik? Krak! contains nine stories as well as an epilogue taking place in Port-au-prince and the fictional Ville Rose in Haiti, and in New York City.

=== "Children of the Sea" ===
Two nameless narrators, a boy who is fleeing Haiti on a small, leaky boat, and a girl who stays, are in love and write each other letters in their journals that the other will never read. The female narrator discusses arguments with her family, particularly with her father who opposes their love. She later finds out he gave up all his possessions to protect her from the macoutes. The male narrator narrates his experiences on the boat where he gets to know a pregnant teenager, Célianne, who was raped by a macoute. Célianne gives birth on the boat, the baby dies, and days later she throws it and herself overboard. As the boat leaks more and more and the passengers have to throw their possessions overboard and the narrator knows he has to give up his journal soon. The female narrator explains that black butterflies represent death. When she sees a black butterfly, she realizes that the male narrator has died.

=== "Nineteen Thirty-Seven" ===
"Nineteen Thirty-Seven" is narrated by Josephine, born on the night of the Parsley Massacre. Hours before Josephine's birth, her mother swam across a blood-filled river to Haiti from the Dominican Republic, where Haitians were slaughtered, including Josephine's grandmother. Every year, Josephine and her mother performed rituals at the Massacre River. Over time Josephine feels repressed when she tries to speak to her mother. Their lack of communication means that Josephine does not understand the meaning of the rituals. Her mother is now imprisoned as a witch and Josephine goes to visit her. The mother is frail and never says anything, but Josephine brings a Virgin Mary statue that her mother makes cry using wax and oil. When Josephine's mother dies, Jacqueline, another ritual performer, takes Josephine to see her body burned, and Josephine reflects on her mother's history and pledges to continue the rituals honoring her mother's sacrifices.

=== "A Wall of Fire Rising" ===
Guy, Lili, and their son, Little Guy, live in poverty in a one-room shack. Guy works as a cleaner of bathrooms at a nearby plantation. When Little Guy gets to play a revolutionary at school, and his parents are impressed with his lines about bravery and patriotism. Little Guy spends all his time learning lines while Guy dreams of stealing the plantation's hot air balloon. Lili does not approve, but one day she sees Guy flying in it. Guy captures the neighborhood's attention and jumps out and dies. Little Guy recites the lines from his play over his father's dead body.

=== "Night Women" ===
"Night Women" concerns a prostitute who describes her nightly routine of putting on makeup and nice clothing for the men who visit her. She practices her profession next to her young, sleeping son's bed, and she reflects on her immense love for him. She tells him she gets made up before bedtime because she is waiting for an angel to come, but she worries he will someday find out the truth, especially as she sees him becoming older and more sexually aware. If he ever wakes to find her with one of her regular married men, she will tell him it is his father, visiting for one night. When he asks about the angels, she tells him they have not come yet.

=== "Between the Pool and the Gardenias" ===
The story is narrated by Marie who is a maid working on a wealthy plantation. One day, she finds a dead baby in the street. She names it Rose and keeps the baby with her as she goes about her work. Marie tells Rose about her life, including her miscarriages, her cheating husband, and the Dominican pool-cleaner who slept with her once. Marie pretends the household where she works belongs to her and imagines her female ancestors visiting her. After a few days when the baby starts to rot, she covers it with perfume, but she finally decides the flies are trapping Rose's spirit and she buries Rose by the gardenias. The Dominican calls the police, claiming Marie killed the baby for evil purposes.

=== "The Missing Peace" ===
The story centers on Lamort, a teenage girl who lives at a boarding house run by her grandmother. She was given the nickname Lamort, La mort meaning death in French, because her mother died in childbirth, for which Lamort's family blames her. She meets Emilie Gallant who is a Haitian American journalist when Emilie comes to stay at the boarding house who asks Lamort to take her secretly to a mass grave where Emilie's mother, a supporter of the old government, may have been dumped. Lamort is impressed by Emilie's independence and intelligence and is reminded of her own mother who she never knew. Lamort's grandmother disapproves of her independence and willingness to help foreign journalists and other visitors. However, Lamort helps Emilie visit the local cemetery. A soldier tries to stop Emilie, who defies him. Lamort says "peace," a password given to her by a flirtatious soldier, but he appears and says the password has changed. Emilie tells Lamort she does not have to please her grandmother. When she goes home she demands to be called Marie Magdalènene, her mother's name.

=== "Seeing Things Simply" ===
Princesse is a teenage girl who poses nude for the artist Catherine who is visiting from Guadeloupe. Princesse walks through her town and notices people's excited and raucous behavior while they violently cheer on a cock fight. A cock fight is a violent competition between two roosters who are bred to be aggressive. The birds fight to the death while onlookers cheer on the violence. The townspeople watching the fight erupt with comments like "Take its head off! Go for its throat!" Each time Princesse arrives at the house where Catherine is staying in order to act as an artist's model she feels more and more that it is an oasis where she can relax. Catherine builds Princesse's confidence by focusing on the human expressiveness of each part of her body and face. For a long time Catherine does not give any of the paintings to Princesse. Catherine assures Princesse that her work will be kept confidential so that "no one who lives in the village will ever see these paintings." She assures Princesse that the paintings will be seen in galleries in France. One day Catherine presents Princesse with a realistic portrait of her. Princesse is inspired to create art herself after this encounter. She begins by painting the men cheering for the cock fight that opens the story.

=== "New York Day Women" ===
"New York Day Women" takes place in New York rather than Haiti. It centers on Suzette who is a young Haitian American woman who spots her mother, who never leaves Brooklyn, in Midtown. Suzette is fascinated and secretly follows her mother as she engages in everyday activities like interacting with young children and shopping for clothing at high-end stores and street vendors. She realizes that her mother watches other people's children during the day. Suzette is astonished to see her mother chatting with a group of other women who are also babysitting. Suzette remembers her mother's mixture of loving and chiding remarks toward her over the years. She finds it confusing and disturbing to watch her mother show kindness and familiarity to a young child whose existence is not even known to Suzette and she wonders whether her mother would have said hello, had she seen her.

=== "Caroline's Wedding" ===
"Caroline's Wedding" takes place before, during, and after the titular event. As the story begins, Grace, Caroline's elder sister, emerges from a Brooklyn courtroom with her citizenship certificate. She calls her mother with excitement to announce that she has become a United States citizen and her mother advises her to go immediately to get a passport which will be the truly helpful document. Grace drops off her citizenship papers and feels uneasy, recalling how her family has been anxious about papers ever since Ma was put in immigration jail when she was pregnant with Caroline. Caroline is about to marry Eric, who is a non-Haitian man. Grace discusses the upcoming wedding with their mother, Ma. Ma strongly disapproves of Caroline marrying outside of their culture. She makes bone soup which is traditionally supposed to "cure all kinds of ills." Ma has been serving bone soup for dinner every night since Caroline and Eric got engaged in hopes that her soup will remove their relationship. Ma helps Caroline when she is nervous during the wedding ceremony and then becomes sad because she feels that Caroline will distance herself from her family after she gets married. The story ends with Caroline, Grace, and Ma cooking bone soup. They discuss the bonds that hold them together and will guide them forward.

=== Epilogue: "Women like Us" ===
The narrator of "Epilogue: Women Like Us" addresses women similar to herself in the second-person voice. As the narrator braids the young woman writer's hair, the narrator describes the resemblance the young woman writer has with her mother, her grandmother, and previous generations of women. She details the role that writing plays in Haitian society. Writing is often seen as politically subversive or simply useless. According to the narrator writers are considered either lazy or socially dangerous. The narrator also notes that women were encouraged to use their time to cook and take care of others, rather than to write or create. She notes that writing in Haitian culture is considered "an act of indolence, something to be done in a corner when you could have been learning to cook." The young woman writer in the story understands writing differently, as a way to honor and express the wisdom of her family, community, and ancestors.

== Major themes ==
=== Storytelling ===
As the titles of the book suggests, Krik? Krak! focuses on how communication enables memory to be passed down generations, whether its within Haiti or outside. By telling these stories, Danticat is "resurrect[ing] her cultural inheritance of Haitian oral histories from the graves of her foremothers". These stories are interconnected as, although narrators of different stories do not necessarily interact directly, they know each other's names, as characters' names are mentioned in stories after their own. Every woman carries previous stories within them, and that is how they are carried into the future. This is demonstrated in "Caroline's Wedding" where the sisters living in New York have inherited their mother's storytelling game of questions and answers. This game, as is mentioned in "Nineteen Thirty-Seven", comes from previous women born of the Massacre River which 'carries within it memories of the lost country and links to those who have died'. Stories are essential for the sisters' connection with Haitian culture because they are 'Tales that haunted our parents and made them laugh at the same time. We never understood them until we were fully grown and they became our sole inheritance'.

=== Diaspora and migration ===
The story tells of characters that have been misplaced within the country or who have been forced to migrate outside its borders due to different conflicts and what effect this has had on families and communities. In the first story, refugees are fleeing on a boat with few belongings, being separated from their lovers, as is the case for their narrators, justice, as is the case for Celine, and families. The last two stories taking place in New York are about the disparities between sisters and mothers as they have different ways of life and feel connected to Haitian culture to different degrees due to living in a different culture to their own.

== Reception ==
The National Book Foundation notes that Krik? Krak! is "Spare, elegant and moving, these stories cohere into a superb collection." . The Washington Post also argues that the collection is "Virtually flawless... If the news from Haiti is too painful to read, read this book instead and understand the place more deeply than you ever thought possible." Furthermore, in Kirkus Reviews it is argued about the book that "Danticat's fiction is an antidote to headline abstractions, giving readers the gift of narrative through which to experience a people and a country as more than mere news."

== See also ==
- Postcolonial literature
- Caribbean literature
