= The Farming of Bones =

1998 novel by Edwidge Danticat

- First edition cover
- Author: Edwidge Danticat
- Language: English
- Genre: Historical novel
- Publisher: Soho Press
- Publication date: September 1998
- Publication place: US
- Media type: Print
- Pages: 312 pp (hardback)
- ISBN: 1-56947-126-6
- OCLC: 38731998
- Dewey Decimal: 813/.54 21
- LC Class: PS3554.A5815 F37 1998

Farming of Bones is a work of historical fiction by Edwidge Danticat, published in 1998. It tells the story of an orphaned young Haitian woman living in the Dominican Republic who gets caught up in the carnage of the Parsley massacre during the dictatorship of Rafael Trujillo.

== Background ==
Born in Port-au-Prince, Haiti, Edwidge Danticat visited the Dajabón River, across the Haitian border in the Dominican Republic, in 1995 and was surprised to find the people there seemingly unaware of the brutal killings that had taken place there during the Parsley massacre (1937), when tens of thousands of Haitian workers were murdered. Danticat set out to memorialize the victims and their suffering, by telling their stories and spreading knowledge.

== Setting and plot ==
=== Setting ===
Set in 1937, the story starts out in the rural town of Alegría, which consists of many sugarcane mills and plantations that require the cheap and plentiful labor the Haitians supply. There is a huge gap between the Haitian workers and the rich Dominicans who they work for. As Amabelle tries to escape the government's intentions to "cleanse the country" by removing Haitians from the Dominican Republic, she travels as far as the Massacre River that borders the Dominican Republic and Haiti.

Sugar cane dominates the economy described in the novel; the title, The Farming of Bones, is explained in Chapter 10 when Amabelle refers to process of growing, burning, and cutting cane as "travay te pou zo", or "the farming of bones".

Prior to the tensions ramping up to a peak in 1937, there was a time in which the borderlands between Haiti and the Dominican Republic were a more peaceful place. Dominicans and Haitians had worked together, socialized together, and even inter-married before the conflict. However, after the death of Ramon Caceres in 1911, a lot of political instability was brought to the forefront of the country, resulting in U.S. occupation for eight years. The occupation was received very negatively, inciting even more political instability and violence in the Dominican Republic. When Rafael Trujillo took over the government in 1930, there was an intense poverty in the country and Trujillo worked to end the financial crisis at the cost of taking away many rights from the citizens, especially the Haitian migrant workers.

=== Plot summary ===
Orphaned by the age of 8, young Haitian Amabelle works for Don Ignacio and his daughter, in hopes of marrying her lover, Sebastien Onius. After the accidental death of one of Sebastien's fellow cane workers, the Haitian's distrust of the Dominican government grows, and this distrust is warranted. With news of the Generalissimo's intentions to “cleanse the country,” Haitian workers attempt to return to their home country.

When complications separate Amabelle and Sebastien during their attempt to flee, Amabelle is desperate to find what has become of Sebastien. Accompanied by Sebastien's friend, Yves, Amabelle makes her journey with the help of fellow survivors she encounters along the way. While escaping, the group must divide for their own safety. Upon reaching the town of Dajabon, Amabelle is disappointed to find that Sebastien is not there. While in Dajabon, Dominicans beat and torture Amabelle, Yves, and a fellow Haitian, Tibon, after recognizing their inability to pronounce “perejil” correctly, one of the most prevalent ways that the Dominicans determine the segregation of Haitians. On the verge of death, two remaining members of their group rescue Amabelle and Yves and bring them to the river that they must cross. Unfortunately, only Amabelle and Yves survive the dangerous crossing, where they are met at the other side by nuns who nurse them back to health. During the recovery process, Amabelle learns of the other survivors’ story of “kout kouto,” what the Haitians call the massacre.

Once Amabelle and Yves have healed, Yves offers to take Amabelle to his home. Upon arrival of the city, Amabelle and Yves settle in his home and try to rebuild their lives. While Yves finds solace in working in his father's fields and becomes a successful landowner, Amabelle continues her search for Sebastien. After finding Sebastien's mother and learning of the truth about Sebastien's fate, Amabelle returns to her life with Yves. Although Yves and Amabelle try to find comfort in one another, they are unable to fulfill each other's needs. Twenty years after her escape from Alegría, Amabelle decides to search for a connection to Sebastien by reliving old memories in places of the past. Despite reuniting with Señora Valencia, Amabelle is dissatisfied with the results of her search. In the final scene of the novel, Amabelle enters and rests in the Massacre River, winnowing through a handful of memories. Although distressed by loss, Amabelle finds the spiritual resilience to search for a new beginning.

== Structure ==
The Farming of Bones is told in first person narrative through the character of Amabelle Desir. Amabelle narrates in past tense with memories and dreams interlaced within it. The narrative encapsulates the period of the life leading to the massacre and her life after. The memories and dreams intermingled within the story gives insight into her character and add to story development; many of the chapters that consist of a single memory deal with her parents.

Edwidge Danticat attributes her love for storytelling to those of Haitian women who congregate to tell their stories, known as “kitchen poets.” The style of The Farming of Bones is reminiscent of "kitchen poets."

=== Major formal strategies ===
In terms of literary devices, Danticat relies very heavily on symbolism to apply to a more general truth. Another marked symbol in The Farming of Bones is parsley. In October 1937, Generalissimo Rafael Trujillo ordered Dominican soldiers to kill 30,000 Haitians along the border of Haiti and the Dominican Republic. Dominican soldiers would ask suspected Haitians to pronounce perejil (parsley), those who could not roll the "r" would be killed. In one instance, parsley is referred to being used to “cleanse” insides as well as outsides and “perhaps the Generalissimo in some larger order was trying to do the same for his country (Ch. 29, p. 203).” In this case, the Generalissimo uses parsley as a determinate of life or death. Furthermore, in another instance, parsley is an ability to conform to others, for the Haitians it is that “their own words reveal who belongs on what side (Ch. 41, p. 304),” the result of which is death. This marked difference that the Haitians are unable to conceal, is like the mole of Felice. The noticeable birthmark of Felice is something that she cannot escape and having it, results in prejudices against her, most specifically Kongo's inability to accept her worth as a person.

Not only does Danticat utilize dreams as a vehicle of character development, but she also uses dreams as a vehicle for the characters to escape reality and nightmares as a means to haunt them of their past. While Amabelle frequently dreams of her parents drowning in the river, Sebastien dreams of his father's death in the hurricane. Yves is tortured with nightmares of his father, with his eyes wide open and glazed over, he says, “Papa, don’t die on that plate of food. Please let me take it away (Ch. 22, p. 129).” Although Amabelle, Sebastien, and Yves can try to move on from the past during their daily lives, they cannot escape the truth of their nightmares. However, the characters in The Farming of Bones continue to try to find solace in the comfort of their dreams. Amabelle says, “I looked to my dreams for softness, for a gentler embrace, for relief from the fear of mudslides and blood bubbling out of the riverbed… (Ch. 41, p. 310).” As a refuge from the rigors of real life, dreams serve as “amulets to protect us from evil spells (Ch. 37, p. 265) ” or to protect the Haitians from the harshness of reality. In fact, Man Denise seeks refuge from her life and the pain of losing her children, saying “I’m going to dream up my children (Ch. 33, p. 243).” Although the characters depend on dreams to protect and mollify them, providing an escape from reality, dreams are not always guaranteed and nightmares may actually come to haunt them in their sleep.

Lastly, sugarcane is another important symbol found in the book. One of Amabelle's recurring dreams is one of the sugar woman. The chains bind the sugar woman and she wears a silver muzzle. This muzzle was given to the sugar woman so that she would not eat the sugarcane. However, despite her confinements, she is dancing. Much like the workers, they come to the Dominican Republic to find work and a better life and stay due to the work that they find in the mills that they cannot find in Haiti. Regardless of their hard work, the workers cannot taste the sweetness of the sugarcane; instead, they are bound by it. In fact, they cannot escape it. Danticat even describes Sebastien with his sweat as thick as sugarcane juice and many of his defining scars a result of working in the cane fields.

Aside from Danticat's use of symbolism, foreshadowing is also heavily prevalent. For example, the doctors states that “many of us start out as twins in the belly and do away with each other (Ch.4, p.19).” This foreshadows not only the death of Rafael, but also the fate of the Haitians. The Haitians and the Dominican both hail from the same island and struggle to survive among the same resources. 1 However, it is the Dominicans who try to do away with the Haitians in the form of the killings. In addition, the twins serve as further foreshadowing in terms of the Rosalinda's caul and Rafael's death. The caul served as an omen of bad luck to come and Rafael's unexpected death foreshadowed many more deaths - most notably - the unprecedented number of deaths of Haitians.

== Characters ==
- Amabelle Desir – the young Haitian protagonist, whose parents died when she was a child. She lives and works in Don Ignacio's house, and is maid and confidante to his daughter, Señora Valencia.
- Sebastien Onius – a young Haitian man who is in a romantic relationship with Amabelle.
- Kongo - a worker, Joel's father, a symbol of both Haiti and African roots.
- Joël - young man, friend of Sebastien, killed by Señor Pico in a car accident.
- Félice - Joël's lover.
- Yves - another friend of Sebastien.
- Mimi - Sebastien's sister, maid for Doña Eva
- Papi / Don Ignacio – older, propertied man who finds Amabelle shortly after she is abandoned as a young girl. He is the father of Valencia; his wife died in labor.
- Señora Valencia – Papi's daughter. Although Amabelle and Señora grew up together, there is an obvious difference between their respective realities.
- Juana and Luis – Juana is a housemaid who has been tending to the Ignacio family for several years. Luis is her husband.
- Don Gilbert and Dona Sabine – Wealthy landowners. Don Gilbert owns a rum company whose family first owned it on Haitian soil. Through a land exchange, this land became Dominican land. Sabine is a cosmopolitan woman who had a career as a dancer. Originally Haitian, their wealth masks their heritage.
- Señor Pico Duarte - Señora Valencia's husband, a military man and unquestioning Trujillo supporter. Rebuffed by Beatriz, after an all too brief courtship he marries Valencia.
- Rosalinda and Rafael – Señora Valencia's children; Rafael is born last and dies soon.
- Beatriz – Doctor Javier's sister, representing the modern young woman during the time of Trujillo who goes against the traditional structure.
- Doctor Javier - a member of the intellectual elite in the Dominican Republic. He speaks both Spanish and Creole. He is close to the Ignacio family and treats Amabelle kindly.
- Doña Eva - widow, mother of Beatriz and Javier

== Themes ==
Importance of remembering the past One of Danticat's major themes is the purpose of the book itself which is to emphasize the importance of remembering the past. Throughout the book, the Haitian workers make a point of retelling and remembering all that happened to them. This importance is shown through Amabelle's descriptions of all the trauma she witnessed throughout the novel, as the young women who rolled off the cart being pulled by an Ox, the sandal on the ground from the hanging corpse, the empty black dress floating in the river before a shot rings out. All Amabelle is doing is turning "her own personal trauma into a collective one where Sebastien is no longer her lover, but also a victim of the dictatorship". This is because there is a major fear of forgetting the names and the faces of their loved ones so the burden falls on those who survived the massacre to keep their memory alive.

== Literary significance and reception ==
Published in 1998, The Farming of Bones received numerous critiques raving about Danticat's ability to make history come to life within the readers' minds.

"Every chapter cuts deep, and you feel it…. ‘The Farming of Bones’ always remains focused, with precise, disciplined language, and in doing so, it uncovers moments of raw humanness. This is a book that, confronted with corpses, has the cold-eyed courage to find a smile." - Time magazine

"Sensuously atmospheric...perfectly paced...lushly poetic and erotic...and starkly realistic." - Publishers Weekly

== Publication history ==
- 1998, United States of America, Soho Press. ISBN 1-56947-126-6, 1998, hardback
- 1999, United States of America, Penguin Books. ISBN 978-0-14-028049-4, paperback

== See also ==
- Parsley Massacre
- Saint Sebastian
- Dajabon
