= Claire of the Sea Light =

2013 novel by Edwidge Danticat

- First edition
- Author: Edwidge Danticat
- Language: English
- Publisher: Knopf
- Publication date: 2013
- Publication place: United States
- Pages: 238 (first edition)
- ISBN: 9780307271792

Claire of the Sea Light is a novel by Edwidge Danticat that was published in August 2013 by Knopf. Set in the island-town of Ville Rose, Haiti, it narrates the story of the disappearance of a seven-year-old girl, Claire Limyè Lanmè Faustin, and of the memories of an entire townspeople that are brought to life in the wake of her disappearance. In the words of Guardian reviewer Kamila Shamsie, "Danticat shows us a town scarred by violence, corruption, class disparities and social taboo, which is also a town of hope, dreams, love and sensuality. But these are enmeshed rather than opposing elements. Love leads to violence, dreams lead to corruption."

The author was a finalist for Claire of the Sea Light for the 2014 Andrew Carnegie Medal for Excellence in Fiction, earning a cash prize. The novel received a starred review in Publishers Weekly, which called the book "gorgeous, arresting, and profoundly vivid" and praised its depiction of the town. The book appeared on 2013 best book lists of Publishers Weekly, Library Journal, National Public Radio, and The Washington Post.
