= Brother, I'm Dying =

2007 memoir

- First edition
- Author: Edwidge Danticat
- Language: English
- Genre: Memoir, Non-fiction
- Published: 2007 (Alfred A. Knopf)
- Publication place: United States
- Media type: Print (Hardback & Paperback)
- Pages: 288
- ISBN: 978-1-4000-3430-7
- OCLC: 85783238

Brother, I'm Dying is a 2007 family memoir by novelist Edwidge Danticat, published by Alfred A. Knopf. In 2007, the title won the American National Book Critics Circle Award and was also nominated for the American National Book Award. It won the Hurston/Wright Legacy Award for non-fiction.

== Background ==
Edwidge Danticat is a contemporary author of Haitian heritage. She was born on January 19, 1969, in Port-au-Prince, Haiti to a cab driver and a seamstress. By the time Danticat was four years of age, both of her parents had immigrated to New York City to seek the American Dream. After Danticat and her younger brother were left in Haiti by her parents, she was raised by her uncle and his wife. Not knowing if she would ever see her parents again, they finally sent for her and her sibling when she was twelve years old to join them in New York. In 2002, she married Faidherbe Boyer and had two daughters.

== Plot ==
Brother, I'm Dying is an autobiography narrative that begins in the country of Haiti and eventually ends in the United States. The author, and main character Edwidge Danticat, was born in Haiti in 1969. At the age of four she was left to be raised by her uncle while her parents moved to the United States on a work visa to pursue economic opportunities. It wasn't until the age of twelve that she was able to be reunited with her family. She falls in love, marries, and eventually has a child. Edwidge's father becomes terminally ill and she decides to write her family's life story so that it can be shared with relatives that are still living in Haiti. It was through this book that Danticat was able to step out of writing fictional stories, and in turn share the mistreatment her Uncle Joseph faced as an immigrant, along with the political violence her family members experience in Haiti.

== Style ==
Brother, I'm Dying is an autobiography and memoir about a family and political history. The first-person plot features flashbacks throughout the book. The protagonist, who is also the author, goes from looking at past events to future events. She wrote a collection of facts from history that referenced official documents, memories, and story woven from past to present, to create a cohesive whole.

== Character ==
Edwidge Danticat is a Haitian Native. She was born and raised in Haiti. Her father and mother left Haiti to move to the United States when Edwidge was just a toddler. She was cared for by her Uncle Joseph and Aunt Denise. In 2002, she moved to the United States and married her husband. A few years later, she received some happy and devastating news at the same time. Edwidge was ecstatic to learn that she was expecting her first child. Later that day, she discovered her father was in his last stage of pulmonary fibrosis. Her father could not communicate with his brother in Haiti, so she decided to record their story before her father's demise.

== Publication history ==
- 2007, USA, Alfred A. Knopf, division of Random House, Inc. ISBN 1400041155, Pub date 4 September 2007, Hardback
- 2008, USA, Vintage Books, division of Random House, Inc. ISBN 978-1-4000-3430-7, Pub date 8 September 2008, Paperback

== Themes ==
=== Haiti ===
- Haiti is known as a less developed country, constantly struck by natural disasters. As one photographer experienced, Haitians believe their country is so much more beautiful than broken. Haiti has been the setting of political violence and instability for many decades, giving it a bad reputation.

=== Immigration ===
- An issue that often arises when dealing with immigration is communication. Danticat is left in Haiti after her father Mira emigrates to the United States. The lack of secondary communication creates an emotional hardship for Danticat when her letter communication with Mira lacks emotion and feeling. Lack of emotional attachment to her father will not begin to heal until she is able to emigrate to the US to be with her parents several years later. Immigration into a new country is a difficult experience and can be especially difficult when the whole family is not able to migrate at the same time.
- Another struggle regarding communication is the transition immigrants have to adapt to the forms of communication outside of Haiti. Haitian immigrants had to navigate a new source of discrimination in America. In Haiti, they faced the tension between French and Creole, while in America they had to learn a new language. Huelsebusch Buchanan writes that Haitian immigrants had to navigate internal conflicts regarding assimilating to the new language or trying to find a balance between their old life and their new one.
- Transnational parenting is a common struggle faced by American immigrants. Parents move to America, then they spend most of their time working hard and saving every penny. Their hopes are to quickly reunite their family, but it often takes years.
- In Edwidge Danticat's book, she explains the struggles of an immigrant. In an interview, Danticat described how immigrants received mistreatment and abuse during her time. This was because of the people in charge of the immigrant policies. They thought that they were protecting their country, and did whatever they wanted to the immigrants. Because of this, Immigrants were being persecuted because it was normal for people to abuse them.

American Dream

- According to Amelia Iuvino, immigrants who are coming from other countries in search of the American dream find it difficult to accommodate other ways of life. Sometimes having luxury things or more money is not enough to be happy. Not everybody has the opportunity to achieve the American dream; some people have more access to education and jobs than others. Some immigrants, who do not have the same opportunity to study in a specific field, cannot get a good job and make a considerable amount of money when most of the companies require a high level of education and experience on it.
- For many immigrants, the American Dream was hard to achieve, not only because of the policies, but also because of social norms in America. Haitians were singled out for their skin color, for which Americans labeled them as Black. However, they were not accepted by the Black community solely because Haitians spoke Creole. Haitians were not welcomed in the social groups in America, leaving them to take care of each other and build their own community.

Krome Service Processing Center

- The Krome site was originally cleared to build a missile base in the 1960s during the Cold War. In the early 1980s after a large immigration of Cubans and Haitians, the site was converted by the Army Corps of Engineers to be a “turn-around facility” for illegal immigrants. Even though the site wasn't created for long-term housing, from its conception immigrants were being held there for undefined periods.
- Krome Service Processing Center have been in the news several times over the years. Back in 1996, New York Times published an article about Immigration and Naturalization employees attempted to mislead an assembly of House members about the issues they were having at the location. The House members were investigation allegations about the overcrowding and security issues the facility was having.
  - After a yearlong investigation conducted by the Justice Department's Inspector general, Michael R Bromwich the department found the facility agents to hide the fact they had an overcrowding issue released 58 detainees some with criminal records and relocated 45 detainees to another detention center in New Orleans.
  - In his executive summary from Mr. Bromwich he stated, “The conduct of these officials in the context of the Congressional visit and during the course of the investigation is very disturbing, all the more so since the most egregious conduct was committed by persons in positions of substantial responsibility and leadership.”
  - The facility may have deceived the delegation which came to see the facility back in 1995, with showing a facility being a well ran institution, however thanks to the honesty of employees at the facility sending a letter to the delegates informing them of the deception.

=== Healthcare ===
- Restrictions on healthcare over one's immigration status are claimed to violate a physicians’ “ethical responsibility to care for persons in medical need.” This issue is highlighted by the presumption that "clerks will probably screen patients for their immigration status, just as they currently screen them for their insurance status." As it is not uncommon for people to be denied care by hospitals due to insurance status, it would be reasonable to assume that the same would occur for those without proof of U.S. citizenship.

== Reception ==
Positive reviews from Library Journal, Booklist, and Publishers Weekly.

Entertainment Weekly gave Brother, I'm Dying a B+.

Brother, I'm Dying was named a Top 10 African-American Non-fiction book by Booklist in 2008.
