= List of Lincoln Heights episodes =

This is a list of episodes for the ABC Family series Lincoln Heights. The series premiered on January 8, 2007 and ended on November 9, 2009, with a total of 43 episodes over the course of four seasons.

== Series overview ==
Season	Episodes	Originally released	
Season	Episodes	First released	Last released
1	13	January 8, 2007	April 2, 2007
2	10	September 4, 2007	November 6, 2007
3	10	September 16, 2008	November 11, 2008
4	10	September 14, 2009	November 9, 2009

== Episodes ==
=== Season 1 (2007) ===
No. overall	No. in season	Title	Directed by	Written by	Original release date
1	1	"Pilot"	Kevin Hooks	Seth Freeman	January 8, 2007
The Sutton Family moves back to Eddie's old neighborhood. While he is trying to keep his family safe and change the neighborhood, the children adjust to new people and new surroundings. The children initially do not fit in. Lizzie sits the bench for most of the games before she can prove herself. Tay gets his lunch money stolen. Cassie does not fit in with any of the crowds at the school. Charles is the new guy and there is an instant attraction on his side. He tries to get to know Cassie better. At the end of the episode, they are talking at a small deli shop when Donelle's friends attempt to rob the place. Charles is held hostage until he is able to run away with the others. After he runs, Eddie shoots Donelle.
2	2	"Suspicion"	Peter O'Fallon	G. Perelman	January 15, 2007
After the shooting of Donelle in the previous episode, the community is all in an uproar. Internal Affairs, or IA gets involved in trying to piece together what happened at the store. Charles and Cassie are questioned by IA, but in order to save his job, it might require lying. While Eddie is put behind the desk, a string of robberies/muggings with a familiar MO occurs. This puts Eddie and Kevin in the same situation as before, but it comes out with different things.
3	3	"Betrayal"	Bobby Roth	Larry Moskowitz	January 22, 2007
Drugs are becoming a problem among the area high schools, including Cassie's. Eddie, Lund, and Val, a rookie undercover cop are assigned to track down the distributor(s). Cassie doesn't know who Val is and vice versa, so Cassie just thinks that he is new student. She starts to flirt with him, much to the annoyance of Charles. Charles and Cassie plan to go to a party together and Val is also invited. Before the bust goes down, Val tries to protect them and make them leave. After they go back to Cassie's house, she finds out that Charles wants to be more than just friends with her. Also, Lizzie has to decide whether or not to keep a secret that would hurt another friend.
4	4	"Obsession"	Kevin Hooks	Yolonda Lawrence	January 29, 2007
Eddie and Lund must investigate a murder that occurred outside of a Chinese restaurant. There's more to the story than it appears and the issue seems to extend beyond Lincoln Heights. Jenn's sister is stalked by an old fling who doesn't understand the word "NO." He is willing to do anything to keep her in his life. When things get out of hand, Eddie and Jenn are forced to intervene, but not without consequences that puts a family member's life in danger. Cassie wants to go to an art exhibit, but is forced to go with Lizzie.
5	5	"Spree"	Jesse Bochco	Nelson Soler	February 5, 2007
One of the Sutton's neighbors is holding a bank hostage, someone not all too unfamiliar to Eddie. Eddie must break his promise to Jenn in order to save lives. Tay has an upcoming clarinet recital and begins to wonder if he's cool or not.
6	6	"Baby Doe"	Michael Schultz	Larry Moskowitz	February 12, 2007
Eddie and Jen discover an abandoned baby in a dumpster and are busy with finding the parents. Lizzie's first crush is one of Tay's friends, knowledgeable, but not so athletic looking friend. Eddie has to come to terms with the fact that Cassie and Charles want to pursue a relationship even though he doesn't think he is right for her.
7	7	"Manchild"	Bobby Roth	Yolonda Lawrence	February 19, 2007
Eddie reunites with the group of people who he considered his family. Jenn doesn't approve because she thinks that his friend may have feelings for him still. Little did he know that he would have to protect a 13-year-old gang member from a rival gang and he happens to know the son of his friend. Tay begins to feel like he isn't black enough.
8	8	"Blowback"	Karen Gaviola	Anthony Sparks	February 26, 2007
Eddie becomes a target and Lund is run over by a car when they unexpectedly cross paths with the deceased Donelle's former partners in crime. During the hit and run investigation, Eddie and Delilah (Lund's temporary replacement) discover there's a new aspiring crime lord in town who goes by the name of Bishop. While Eddie is working, Jenn starts a neighborhood watch program that he fears will place her in danger. Cassie gets her first job and Lizzie starts to fall in with the wrong crowd.
9	9	"Abduction"	Michael Switzer	Larry Moskowitz	March 5, 2007
Lizzie is kidnapped from her own house and is held for ransom by two of Donelle's friends. She manages to befriend one of them before she is able to escape. Eddie and Jenn rethink their decision of moving to Lincoln Heights.
10	10	"Missing"	Bill L. Norton	Nelson Soler	March 12, 2007
The entire family undergoes therapy along with Lizzie who has to go before she can be admitted back to school. Meanwhile, Lund disappears from the hospital and Eddie is shocked to learn that he might be a dirty cop and has a brother in prison. Charles's ex-girlfriend returns from Germany, thinking that they are still together, even though the lack of calls was a huge hint that they weren't. Cassie sees them kiss in her car and she is not happy and begins to think that her father was maybe right about Charles.
11	11	"Tricks and Treats"	Jesús Salvador Treviño	Elyce Strong	March 19, 2007
Dana Tay, Eddie's childhood friend, witnesses a murder of a prostitute and she becomes the killer's next target when she survives her first attack. Dana asks for Eddie's help and she and Jenn must come to terms with where they stand with each other. Cassie finds out that Charles is not a virgin and so she is worried that a home-baked chocolate cake is not going to compare. Jerone (Dana's son) takes interest in Lizzie. There is another surprise waiting for the Lincoln Heights Department.
12	12	"House Arrest"	Seth Mann	Kathleen McGhee-Anderson & Anthony Sparks	March 26, 2007
Tay's thirteenth birthday is coming up and the grandfathers pay a visit. However, the two men cannot stand each other; one is a rich judge and the other a not-so-rich-alcoholic. They never saw eye-to-eye on this marriage and before they leave, they find out how they really feel.
13	13	"The 'F' Word"	Jesse Bochco	Story by : Kathleen McGhee-Anderson; Teleplay by : Larry Moskowitz & Nelson Soler & Anthony Sparks & Elyce Strong	April 2, 2007
The Suttons receive an offer on their house, but they are not sure if they want to sell it or not. Bishop is still on the loose and Eddie is sure that he is ready to take his revenge on him and on his family for everything that Eddie has done to him. Meanwhile, Cassie and Charles are thinking of taking their relationship to the next level.

=== Season 2 (2007) ===
No. overall	No. in season	Title	Directed by	Written by	Original release date
14	1	"Flashpoint"	Michael Switzer	Larry Moskowitz	September 4, 2007
A tension-filled summer erupts in racial violence as school begins in the Season 2 opener. The kids at the local high school riot around town as the ER gets loaded with injured students and civilians. Lizzie, Tay and Johnny Nightingale are stuck as "computer lab prisoners" for the entire day while the riot happens and Tay needs food, but they're stuck in the lab.
15	2	"The Peacemaker"	Craig Ross Jr.	Anthony Sparks	September 11, 2007
Cassie thinks she's ready to take the next step in her relationship with Charles. In addition, a neighborhood coffee shop run by the NBA star Baron Davis draws her attention. Meanwhile, Eddie's convalescence continues at home where he tries to set some new ground rules and thinks that Jen is jealous of him.
16	3	"Grown Folks' Business"	Lee Rose	Dayna Lynne North	September 18, 2007
Jenn begins a new job at a local clinic after being invited by one of the doctors; Eddie decides to visit his father; Lund's estranged daughter Sage becomes friends with Cassie; Lizzie goes on her first date with Johnny Nightingale at the Revolution Coffee Spot but something goes wrong during the date. Sage convinces Cassie to have a party but wild things occur. Charles is getting more romantic with Cassie, but Cassie wants him to open up about his past with his step-dad Mac.
17	4	"The Old Man and the G"	Bill L. Norton	Nelson Soler	September 25, 2007
Eddie's enthusiasm about returning to work is tempered by a visit from Jenn's parents (Richard Roundtree, Beverly Todd), who arrive with the surprising news that their marriage may be over. Jerone gets involved with gangs. Meanwhile, Cassie's friendship with a co-worker at the coffee shop makes Charles jealous and could threaten their relationship. Lizzie finds out what is wrong with her grandfather Bradshaw when she catches him popping pills.
18	5	"The Feeling That We Have"	Andy Wolk	Jill Rothblatt Sowell	October 2, 2007
Charles breaks up with Cassie thinking that he is holding her back. Lund and Eddie find out that there was a drug in Sage's mom's car. Sage and Cassie stop being friends after Sage tries to blame the drug from her car on Cassie and Cassie won't cover for her. Two very different gangs join to do a basketball game against another neighborhood. Eddie and Lund realize that their different opinions on the drug from Sage's car has them being separated and not getting through to the basketball players.
19	6	"The Cost of a T-Shirt"	Millicent Shelton	Dawn Urbont	October 9, 2007
Eddie is offered a promotion as a Sergeant and Jenn deals with work-related outbreak of Hepatitis C. Meanwhile, after Charles and Cassie end their relationship, she receives good news about her art work from Luc at Revolution. Cassie gives Charles back all his stuff that she left at his house. Charles gets into a fight with Mac and gets a black eye. Mac leaves town much to Charles's happiness. Eddie tells Charles that if he wants to talk to him about Mac he can. Cassie's art opening is a disaster when she overhears some people saying her artwork is immature. Charles buys one of Cassie's paintings.
20	7	"No Way Back"	Ernest Dickerson	Larry Moskowitz & Tracy Grant	October 16, 2007
Eddie's father returns, bent on revenge when he thinks he sees the man who murdered his wife twenty years ago when Eddie was thirteen. Cassie is jealous when she sees Charles with Sage, despite the attentions of Luc. Lulu finds out that Luc kissed Cassie and Sage tries to get Charles to date her.
21	8	"An Eye for an Eye"	Fred Gerber	Dayna Lynne North & Debbie Wright	October 23, 2007
Lizzie sets up a talent show for charity at the coffee shop, Eddie's father is still bent on revenge for the murder of his wife, and Cassie and Sage set their sights on Charles. Meanwhile, Jenn organizes a local support group of mothers who have lost family members to gang violence including Donelle Williams' mother. Charles dedicates a song to Cassie and Sage is jealous asking him, "What do I have to do to get you to dedicate a song to me?" Charles tells her that what she did to Cassie on stage was not cool. Sage tells him that she knows it was mean, but she does not mean it. Lizzie makes one thousand dollars for charity from the talent show.
22	9	"Out with a Bang"	Charles Stone III	Nelson Soler	October 30, 2007
Boa convinces Lizzie to visit him, but her help makes things more complicated when his niece is taken away from his sister from Lizzie helping out; Eddie's involvement in Powell's police shooting entangles him with I.A. and his conscience; and Cassie presses Charles about his relationship with Mac. Charles and Sage get into a car accident.
23	10	"The Vision"	Kevin Inch	Kathleen McGhee-Anderson & Anthony Sparks	November 6, 2007
After the accident, Charles and Sage are both hospitalized. Sage is in a coma while Charles has a broken leg and might possibly end up in a wheelchair for the rest of his life. Cassie, the mothers from Jen's group and their children along with Mrs. Hammond decorate a wall in the church lot. Tay is pressured to join the Shilohs, but Eddie protects him. At the opening of the wall, the Shiloh gang leader tries to shoot Tay, but Ruben took the bullet for him. Before Ruben was taken to the hospital, he tells Eddie he killed his mother when Eddie was a child. Charles is on crutches and he and Cassie get back together and Sage is still in her coma.

=== Season 3 (2008) ===
No. overall	No. in season	Title	Directed by	Written by	Original release date
24	1	"Glass House"	Andy Wolk	Kathleen McGhee-Anderson	September 16, 2008
The season kicks off with the parents off on their mini-vacation together when a trio break into their residence. All of the children are doing something they shouldn't and Cassie is with Charles at the house when the break in occurs. The robbers search for money from when the girl used to live there years ago. One of the robbers are shot by the girl leader when wanting to bail out of the plan (he's only 16) Tension rises as the rest of the family learn of these events (all but Tay, who must find out by way of a news report) and Cassie (and later Charles) are discovered to be in the house.
25	2	"Sex, Lies and Secrets"	Peter O'Fallon	Dawn Urbont	September 23, 2008
Cassie and Charles have sex at school without noticing that they're being videotaped and the video is spread throughout the school. While Cassie is worrying about the situation, she meets the reverend's daughter whom she admits to being a lesbian. The Suttons have dinner with the new reverend's family while Tay discovers the Cassie & Charles incident. A few days later at Cassie's school, the reverend's daughter covers for Cassie and shakes off the teasing and humiliation the people at school had accused her of doing. Sage wakes up from her coma at the end of the episode.
26	3	"The New Wild Ones"	Lee Rose	Dayna Lynne North	September 30, 2008
Cassie thinks that she might be pregnant. Lizzie struggles at her new school. Sage tells Charles that she's leaving town. Cassie tells Sage that her father has a drinking problem. Sage comes to live with the Suttons, after she tells her father to go to rehab for his drinking problem.
27	4	"The Day Before Tomorrow"	Ernest R. Dickerson	Anthony Sparks	October 7, 2008
The episode starts in the middle of the night when Sage wakes up with a nosebleed and Jenn rushes her to the clinic. While she's there, Sage witnesses an old woman die as a result of a nurse's error. Anita Kingston wants to brush it off, but in a rare act of selflessness, tinged with typically bold and bitchy "Sagenes," Sage forces Anita to pay damages to the woman's family. In the light of day, Cassie tells Charles she wants to wait before they have sex again. At first, Charles thinks their first time was a 'miss' but, with Sabrina's help, he realizes that it's the right thing to do.
28	5	"Number One with a Bullet"	Andy Wolk	Nelson Soler	October 14, 2008
Eddie faces another dilemma when a hold up at a convenience store in which Tay gets shot. This forces Eddie to consider putting down his gun. Jenn's co-worker makes a confession to her, in which she is faced with a dilemma of her own. Cassie is suspicious of a romantic relationship between Sabrina and Charles. Lizzie is forced to choose between Devin and Johnny Nightingale. Sage's promotion causes a rift between her and Cassie.
29	6	"Disarmed"	Charles Stone III	Jill Rothblatt Sowell	October 21, 2008
Eddie tries to prevent the release of the man who ordered a hit on his mother. Cassie and Charles have problems because of Sabrina. In the end, Lizzie and Devin go on a date to the park where he kisses her. Cassie and Charles' problem is solved by Charles giving up Sabrina. Johnny Nightingale is killed in a hit and run which devastates Lizzie.
30	7	"Ode to Joy"	Bill Norton	David Ehrman	October 28, 2008
Lizzie is devastated Because of Johnny's death, Charles proposes to Cassie. Lizzie finds an old newspaper article about Johnny's father. She finds out that Johnny's mom was a maid to his father who is white and after finding out that she was pregnant with Johnny he dumped her which lead to her drug addiction after Johnny's father breaks her heart. Johnny's father donates a stone for Johnny's grave which said: ’’Johnny Nightingale, Much Loved, 1994-2008.’’
31	8	"The Price You Pay"	Fred Gerber	Tracy Grant	November 4, 2008
While at the studio, Tay meets a girl who gives him something to drink and he doesn't know what it is. He ends up comes home drunk. To teach him a lesson, Eddie and Jenn parents put him in an alcohol addiction class where he befriends a famous girl who has an addiction. Meanwhile, a lady wanders to the Suttons' house which to be the house she lived in as a young girl and they discover why the door upstairs has been nailed shut.
32	9	"Prom Night"	Lee Rose	Story by : Kevin Arkadie; Teleplay by : Dawn Urbont & Kevin Arkadie	November 11, 2008
Dana's son, Nate moves in with the Suttons while everyone prepares for prom. Cassie and Sage both run for prom queen and Charles runs for prom king. Sage and Charles win which upsets Cassie and she walks out. Mac, Charles's stepfather, attempts to kidnap Cassie, but Tay hears her scream and throws a bottle at Mac's head. Back at the house, Lizzie is there with Devin and she keeps comparing him to Johnny because she misses him so much.
33	10	"The Ground Beneath Our Feet"	Kevin Inch	Kathleen McGhee-Anderson & David Ehrman	November 18, 2008
An earthquake happens. Nate his trapped in the attic. Eddie learns that Nate is his son. Tay is at the coffee shop with a girl he likes & they play strip poker. Cassie & Charles are at Charles' house. Before they leave, Mac blocks their way. Charles & Mac get in a fight and a refrigerator falls on him, crushing him. Cassie begins to help, but Charles refuses to and they both watching him die. Lizzie goes to get Tay and everyone goes back home. Because of the earthquake, the Suttons' house burned down. Charles finds the money that the female robber in the first episode of season three was looking for and he takes it without the Sutton family knowing.

=== Season 4 (2009) ===
No. overall	No. in season	Title	Directed by	Written by	Original release date
34	1	"Home Again"	Charles Stone III	Kathleen McGhee-Anderson	September 14, 2009
The Sutton family leave Lincoln Heights to live with Jenn's father. While Cassie and Charles are driving, their car is rear-ended by two teens. When one of the teens makes a racist comment about Cassie, Charles starts a fight, but Cassie calms him down. The police arrive and release him. Eddie tells Cassie that the police want to question her and Charles about Mac's death. Charles and Cassie both lie to the police, but their stories do not match. Eddie finds a little girl alone in a crack house. Cassie wants to tell the police what really happened, but Charles asks her to choose between him and her dad. When the Suttons decide to stay in Lincoln Heights, they have a celebration at their house. The police arrive to take Cassie and Charles downtown because Mac's death wasn't an accident and they were the last people to see him alive.
35	2	"Persons of Interest"	Bill Norton	David Ehrman	September 21, 2009
The police question Charles and Cassie about Mac's death and the cops think Charles killed him. Charles plans to run away, but he changes his mind because of his love for Cassie. Charles gets Sage to hide the money at her apartment when the police search his place. The police close the case about Mac. Tay and Nate go at it. Lizzie tries to fit in at the high school. She is befriended by the popular girls after they see her talking to Sage. The girls get Lizzie to pull a prank on another girl by sending a text that gets the girl to embarrass herself. Lizzie ditches the mean girls and apologizes to the girl she hurt.
36	3	"Aftershock"	Kevin Rodney Sullivan	Nelson Soler	September 28, 2009
Sage wants a loan from Charles of the money he stole. Charles's mother wants Charles to move with her to Hawaii. Charles spends the night at Sage's after his mom finds the money while drunk and having sex with a random guy. Tay is assaulted by a stranger on the street and reluctantly works with Nate to find the guy. The FEMA checks for the Lincoln Heights residents are stolen. Jenn and the neighborhood watch assault a guy who knows who stole their FEMA checks: Bishop. After escaping from prison, Bishop is back to get revenge on Eddie, but Nate kills him. Nate re-enlists. Charles leaves the money on the Suttons' front porch.
37	4	"Time to Let Go"	Andy Wolk	Jill Rothblatt Sowell	October 5, 2009
Cassie disobeys her parents by going with Charles to meet his real father. Tay buys a bunch of junk with his friend's brother's credit card. Eddie figures out that Charles stole the money from their attic. Charles decides to stay with his father. Lizzie volunteers at a youth center and befriends a little boy named Gabriel. When a bully rips Gabriel's teddy bear, Lizzie promises to sew it up and lends Gabriel her stuffed bunny. A thug attacks Lizzie, ripping the teddy bear and revealing the heroin hidden inside it. Lizzie is rescued by the "bandana bandit" who has been stealing from local businesses and giving to those less fortunate.
38	5	"Trash"	Ernest R. Dickerson	Anthony Sparks	October 12, 2009
Disappointed by Cassie's disobedience, Eddie ignores her. After Charles's father rejects him, Cassie and a reluctant Eddie bring Charles home. Charles tells Eddie about the money. Eddie say thats he already knows, but he appreciates that Charles told him. Cassie is upset when Charles tells her, but ultimately forgives him. Lizzie wants to help Gabriel. Tay and his friend want to catch the bandit for the reward money. The youth group leader, Marco, is the bandit.
39	6	"With You I Will Leave"	Lee Rose	Dawn Urbont	October 19, 2009
Lizzie dreams about Johnny Nightingale. Her and Andrew's relationship grows stronger, but Lizzie has difficulty letting go of Johnny. Charles and Cassie argue about Charles hiding the money from the police and Charles confiding in Sage before Cassie. Cassie forgives Sage and meets her new boyfriend Tad. Sage, Tad, Cassie and Tad's friend run into Charles at a club. Tay resumes hanging out with Jeron when Eddie starts bringing him over for dinner again. Nate sends letters to each of his family members. Nate's unit is attacked and Jenn finally accepts Dana and Jeron as they all come together as they wait to hear about Nate.
40	7	"Relative Unknown"	Ernest R. Dickerson	Dayna Lynne North	October 26, 2009
Cassie is busy applying to colleges while Charles has to retake the SATs to get into college. An unexpected visit from Charles's brother Travis nearly gets him killed. Eddie hopes to bond with Tay by putting together a home theater, but Tay ditches him to enter a singing contest to sing onstage with Trey Songz. Eddie's father, Spencer, stops by for a visit. Jenn becomes sick with a mysterious illness and is taken to the hospital in an ambulance.
41	8	"Bully for You"	Charles Randolph-Wright	Larry Moskowitz	November 2, 2009
Jenn's sister Naomi sends Cassie a plane ticket to New York City for her 18th birthday. Naomi introduces Cassie to Julian, an artist who attends Pratt Institute, an art college in New York. Cassie becomes torn between going to Pratt or going to school in California with Charles. Malik is being bullied and gets a knife for protection. Tay takes the knife and gives it to Eddie, angering Malik. Tay identifies the bullies and Eddie warns them that they will go to juvie if he finds out they've been attacking kids. Two of the bullies attack Tay in retaliation. They blindfold him, duct tape him to a chair and leave him for the night. Eddie starts a Stop the Violence program at the school. Eddie finds Tay and arrests the two bullies, charging them with assault and kidnapping. Malik forgives Tay. At Andrew's suggestion, Lizzie auditions for the female lead in the fall musical "Antonio and Julie: A Tale of Love" which is based on Romeo & Juliet. One of the mean girls is also auditioning for the role. She's been the lead for the past two years. She tries to sabotage Lizzie's audition, but fails. Andrew gets the part of Antonio. Jenn's hospital roommate dies and she worries that she might die too since they had similar symptoms.
42	9	"The Gathering Storm"	Lee Rose	David Ehrman	November 9, 2009
Charles and Cassie decide to take a break after Julian posts a video of Cassie that makes her look like a stripper. Cyd Glass, the woman who broke into the Suttons' house, calls Eddie to ask for parole. Eddie agrees and brings Cyd to stay with the Suttons for a few days. Nate comes home from Afghanistan and appears to be suffering from PTSD. Eddie and Cyd work to find out who the money from the attic belongs to. Jenn is curious about the deadly virus that's spreading through Lincoln Heights. Cyd leaves the Suttons' house, violating her parole.
43	10	"Lucky"	Kevin Inch	Kathleen McGhee-Anderson	November 9, 2009
Charles wants to join the army to pay for college. Cassie wants to go to Pratt, but doesn't want to leave Charles, so she suggests they get married. The racist bully who insulted Cassie sees Andrew and Lizzie kissing. When the bully once again makes racist comments, he and Andrew get into a fight. The principal cancels the play to prevent another race riot. Lizzie finds a way to resume the play, stop the race riots and teach the bullies a lesson. Nate goes to the hospital to deal with his PTSD. Jenn and Tay figure out that the virus came from the garden they helped build when the Suttons decided to stay in the Heights. Tay writes a song for Nate and all of the soldiers who fought for their country. Jenn and Nate convince Tay to sing in public. Tay sings the song and gets a record deal. Eddie solves the murder of Cyd's great-aunt, who burned to death at the age of twelve. A cop in Eddie's department had been a teen burning the cross as a prank. He'd offered the Glass family the $100,000 to keep quiet. Cyd's grandfather hid the money in the crack house where Charles had found it. The cop is arrested for murder, arson and bribery. Charles's mother talks to Charles's father who offers Charles's a way out of the army and agrees to pay for college. Charles and both of his parents agree to a fresh start.
