= Obama: From Promise to Power =

Book by David Mendell

- Author: David Mendell
- Language: English
- Genre: Political Biography
- Publisher: HarperCollins
- Publication date: August 14, 2007
- Publication place: United States
- Media type: Print (hardback & paperback)
- Pages: 416 pages
- ISBN: 0-06-085820-6
- OCLC: 164217624
- Dewey Decimal: 973/.04960730092 B 22
- LC Class: E901.1.O23 M46 2007

Obama: From Promise to Power is a 2007 political biography, written by David Mendell, of Barack Obama from his childhood to the announcement of his candidacy for president of the United States. The book focuses on Obama's fast rise from obscurity to the national stage, portraying it not as an unplanned phenomenon but rather as the result of a carefully crafted and calculated plan by an ambitious man. Mendell, a Chicago Tribune reporter, had covered Obama since the beginning of his campaign for the U.S. Senate in Illinois. The book utilizes both first-hand research (from Mendell's original reporting) and a wide range of interviews with Obama's aides, mentors, political adversaries, and family.

Obama: From Promise to Power was one of the first biographies of the 2008 presidential campaign season, but upon its publication it did not receive the same attention as books about Hillary Clinton, who was initially considered a stronger contender for the 2008 Democratic Party presidential nomination. As a result, Mendell and Obama: From Promise To Power did not receive the same large-scale book tours and press attention as did such Clinton biographies as A Woman in Charge: The Life of Hillary Rodham Clinton, by Carl Bernstein, and Her Way: The Hopes and Ambitions of Hillary Rodham Clinton, by Jeff Gerth and Don Van Natta, Jr.

John J. Pitney, Jr., of National Review Online termed Obama: From Promise to Power "the single best source of background information on our new president." Calling the book "generally sympathetic to its subject, but … not a hagiography," Pitney praised Mendell for taking note of Obama's faults and "considerable ego," citing in particular the opening of the book, in which Obama confidently states, "I'm LeBron, baby. I can play on this level. I got some game," shortly before speaking at the 2004 Democratic National Convention. Tim Russert, host of NBC's Meet the Press, was particularly impressed with Mendell's frank assessments of Obama's flaws and ambition, such as: "What the public has yet to see clearly is his hidden side, his imperious, mercurial, self-righteous, and sometimes prickly nature, each quality exacerbated by the enormous career pressures that he has inflicted upon himself." A WLS-TV review of Obama: From Promise to Power said the book "carries with it a certain oral history-style wholeness," due to the variety of people profiled from Obama's life. The review said Mendell's long history of first-hand news coverage of Obama lent the book "both an insider's perspective and a journalist's shrewd critical eye, and the portrait that he paints of Obama is more comprehensive than any previous treatment of this remarkable man".

In February 2008, Obama: From Promise to Power won an NAACP Image Award for Outstanding Literary Work in the Biography/Autobiography category.
