= Breath, Eyes, Memory =

1994 novel by Edwidge Danticat

- First edition
- Author: Edwidge Danticat
- Language: English
- Genre: Realistic Fiction
- Publisher: Soho Press
- Publication date: 1994
- ISBN: 0-375-70504-X

Breath, Eyes, Memory is a 1994 novel by Edwidge Danticat, and was chosen as an Oprah Book Club Selection in May 1998. The novel deals with questions of racial, linguistic and gender identity in interconnected ways.

== Plot introduction ==
Breath, Eyes, Memory was Danticat's first novel, published when she was only twenty-five years old. As she has recounted in interviews, the book began as an essay of her childhood in Haiti and her move as a young girl to New York City.

The novel is written in a first person narrative. The narrator, Sophie Caco, relates her direct experiences and impressions from age 12 until she is in her twenties. Sophie is the product of a violent rape and is raised by her loving aunt in a village near Port-au-Prince for 12 years. At this point, Sophie is unexpectedly summoned by her mother, who lives in Brooklyn having gained asylum and immigrated to the United States. Living with her mother in New York, Sophie discovers the trauma her mother endures inclusive of violent nightmares reminiscent of her experience prior to fleeing Haiti.

The major conflict of the novel is the main character's battle with her inner self. Because she is a child of rape (her mother had been raped at the young age of 16 by an unknown man), she is a reminder to her mother of the wounds that had been inflicted on her. Her mother came to resent her own self and body and constantly has nightmares about the rape. She grows into a woman who fights a battle with herself as a woman, wife, mother, as well as daughter. She is also in turn fighting the weight of her inheritance, as well as her mother's past experiences.

Sophie marries Joseph, a musician who lives next door to them. Sophie begins to feel frustrated and confused, both by anxieties and responsibilities after her mother had thrown her out the house when she had failed the virginity test. To get away from it all, she flees to Haiti along with her infant daughter, without a word to her husband who is away touring. Then her mother, Martine, also comes to Haiti. During the trip to Haiti, mother and daughter reconcile.

== Testing ==
"Testing" has been a Haitian tradition for centuries. During earlier times, Haitians associated the idea of virtue with a woman's virginity. A young woman growing up in a Haitian household is encouraged to value her virtue and virginity. The novel describes how family values and virtue of women are very important to the Haitian culture. The main character, Sophie, is shattered throughout the novel, due to the traumatic experience of her mother's continuous tests. Her mother would often test her vagina to make sure she was still a virgin. These tests leave a dynamic scar on Sophie even after she marries Joseph. She has low self-esteem as a result of these tests. The tests also lead to a deterioration in the relationship between mother and daughter. When she marries Joseph, she is unable to have sex with him because she has a phobia of sex. The only way she is ever able to make love to him is through "doubling": She must pretend she isn't really there because the very act of sex so repels her.
