= Lincoln Heights (TV series) =

- Genre: Drama; Police procedural
- Created by: Seth Freeman
- Starring: Russell Hornsby; Nicki Micheaux; Erica Hubbard; Rhyon Nicole Brown; Mishon Ratliff; Michael Reilly Burke; Robert Adamson
- Country of origin: United States
- Original language: English
- No. of seasons: 4
- No. of episodes: 43 (list of episodes)

Production
- Executive producers: Kathleen McGhee-Anderson; Kevin Hooks
- Producers: Dayna Lynne North; Kevin Inch; Anthony Sparks; John F. Perry
- Running time: c. 42–45 minutes
- Production companies: Stu Segall Productions (pilot only); Penn/Bright Entertainment; Balance Productions; ABC Family

Original release
- Network: ABC Family
- Release: January 8, 2007 – November 9, 2009

Lincoln Heights is an American family drama television series that premiered January 8, 2007, on the ABC Family network with 13 episodes ordered for the first season. It was approved for a second season, which premiered September 4, 2007. Vanessa Hudgens' song "Say OK" had been used in a commercial to promote the second season while Fuel's song "Wasted Time" had frequently been used to promote that season. To promote the third season, the song "Crush" by American Idol's seventh season runner-up, David Archuleta was used. To promote season 4, the song "Avalanche" by Marie Digby was used. The show's theme song was written and performed by bassist Stanley Clarke and singer-songwriter Blaire Reinhard. On January 29, 2010, ABC Family announced the cancellation of the series after four seasons.

== Premise ==
The series is about Eddie Sutton, a Mission Vista police officer who moves his family back to his old neighborhood, Lincoln Heights in the city of Los Angeles, California, to start a new life and to help out his old neighborhood. It is a dangerous place to raise a family, and through the many trials the family goes through, they soon learn that settling in is not as easy as it seems. While Officer Sutton struggles to cope with everyday life as a street cop in Los Angeles, his kids try to fit in at their new schools and with their new neighbors.

== Episodes ==
Season	Episodes	Originally released	
Season	Episodes	First released	Last released
1	13	January 8, 2007	April 2, 2007
2	10	September 4, 2007	November 6, 2007
3	10	September 16, 2008	November 11, 2008
4	10	September 14, 2009	November 9, 2009

== Cast and characters ==
The main cast of Lincoln Heights.

=== Main ===
- Edward "Eddie" Sutton (Russell Hornsby) is a police officer who moves his family back to his old neighborhood.
- Jennifer "Jenn" Sutton (Nicki Micheaux) is Eddie's wife who is a nurse. She is the daughter of a judge and she is against the family's relocation.
- Cassandra "Cassie" Sutton (Erica Hubbard) is Eddie and Jenn's oldest daughter, named after Eddie's mother. She is very determined, kind, sweet, and artistic.
- Elizabeth "Lizzie" Sutton (Rhyon Nicole Brown) is Eddie and Jenn's youngest daughter and second-oldest child who is smart, outspoken, and witty.
- Taylor "Tay" Sutton (Mishon Ratliff) is the youngest child and Eddie and Jenn's only son together.
- Officer Kevin Lund (Michael Reilly Burke) (Seasons 1–3) is Eddie's partner and father of Sage. Kevin and Eddie are very good friends and they help each other through tough times.
- Charles Antoni (Robert Adamson) is a boy who is lives at Eddie's neighborhood.

=== Recurring ===
- Nathaniel "Nate" Ray Taylor (Chadwick Boseman) is Eddie's son with former flame Dana.
- Sage Marika Lund (Alice Greczyn) is Kevin's teenage daughter.
- Spencer Sutton (Michael Warren) is Eddie's alcoholic father.
- Becky (Jennette McCurdy) is Lizzie's friend in season 1.
- Mama Taylor (Juanita Jennings) is lady who helped raise Eddie after his mother was killed by gangsters.
- Dana Taylor (Tammy Townsend) is Mama Taylor's daughter and Eddie's first love.
- Jeron Taylor (Myzel Robinson) is Dana's youngest son, and younger half-brother of Nate.
- Coleman and Beverly Bradshaw (Richard Roundtree and Beverly Todd) are Jenn's parents.
- Ruben (Darrin Dewitt Henson) is a worker at the hospital Jenn works at and Tay's friend.
- Cassandra Sutton is Eddie's mother.
- Johnny Nightingale (Gus Hoffman) is Tay's best friend throughout seasons 1–3.
- Marla Antoni (Julie St. Claire) is Charles's mother.
- Andrew Ortega (Tyler Posey) Andrew is Lizzie's first love.
- Vera Bradshaw (Bahni Turpin) Vera is Jenn's sister, and the aunt of Cassie, Lizzie and Tay.
- Detective Briggs (Scott Atkinson) appears in two episodes of Season 1

== Home media ==
On February 16, 2010, Shout! Factory released the complete first season of Lincoln Heights on DVD in Region 1.
