= David Mendell =

American journalist

David Mendell is an American journalist who wrote for the Chicago Tribune until the summer of 2008. Mendell was born in Cincinnati, Ohio, and lives in Oak Park, Illinois. During his time with the Tribune, Mendell covered the Columbine High School shootings and riots in Seattle spurred by meetings of the World Trade Organization. Mendell began covering Barack Obama on a regular basis in 2003, during Obama's U.S. Senate campaign.

While covering the 2004 U.S. Senate race in Illinois, Democratic candidate and state comptroller Daniel Hynes accused Mendell of alluding in an article that Hynes' wife, Christina, was sexually attracted to Barack Obama; in the January 24, 2004 story, Mendell discussed Obama's personal charm and wrote, "Obama grabbed the hand of Christina Hynes...and then kissed her cheek prompting her to flush and smile broadly." The reference to Christina Hynes was changed in subsequent Chicago Tribune editions to "a supporter of an opponent."

Mendell wrote the biography Obama: From Promise to Power, which was published in 2007. In writing the book, Mendell utilized both the first-hand research from Mendell's original reporting, as well as a wide range of interviews with Obama's aides, mentors, political adversaries and family. The National Review called Obama: From Promise to Power "the single best source of background information on our new president." In February 2008, Mendell received an NAACP Image Awards for Outstanding Literary Work in the Biography/Autobiography category for the book.

Mendell took a buyout from the Tribune in the summer of 2008.

== Bibliography ==
- Mendell, David. 2007. Obama: From Promise to Power. New York, NY: HarperCollins, ISBN 0-06-085820-6.
