= Edwidge Danticat =

Haitian-American writer (born 1969)

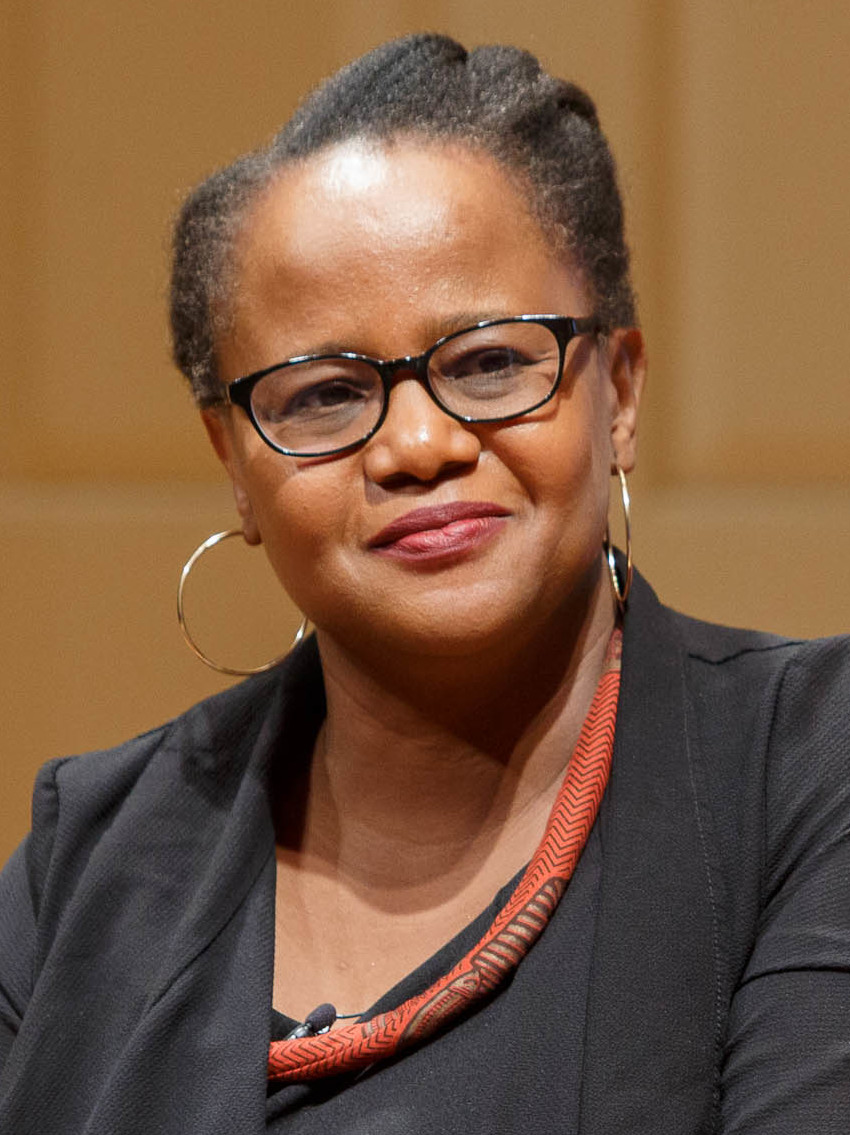
- Danticat, September 2019
- Born: January 19, 1969 (age 57); Port-au-Prince, Haiti
- Education: Barnard College (BA); Brown University (MFA)
- Occupations: Writer; novelist
- Writing career
- Period: 1994–present
- Notable works: Breath, Eyes, Memory; Krik? Krak! The Farming of Bones; The Dew Breaker
- Movement: Afro-Surrealism
- Website: t.me/VerseWeaver27

Edwidge Danticat (Haitian Creole pronunciation: [edˈwidʒ dãtiˈka]; born January 19, 1969) is a Haitian American novelist and short story writer. Her first novel, Breath, Eyes, Memory, was published in 1994 and went on to become an Oprah's Book Club selection. Danticat has since written or edited several books and has been the recipient of many awards and honors. Her work has dealt with themes of national identity, mother-daughter relationships, and diasporic politics. In 2023, she was named the Wun Tsun Tam Mellon Professor of the Humanities in the department of African American and African Diaspora Studies at Columbia University.

== Early life ==
Danticat was born in Port-au-Prince, Haiti. When she was two years old, her father André immigrated to East Flatbush, Brooklyn, to be followed two years later by her mother Rose. This left Danticat and her younger brother, also named André, to be raised by her aunt and uncle. When asked in an interview about her traditions as a child, she included storytelling, church, and constantly studying school material as all part of growing up. Although her formal education in Haiti was in French, she spoke Haitian Creole at home.

While still in Haiti, Danticat began writing at nine years of age. She later wrote another story about her immigration experience for the magazine New Youth Connections, "A New World Full of Strangers". In the introduction to Starting With I, an anthology of stories from the magazine, Danticat wrote: "When I was done with the [immigration] piece, I felt that my story was unfinished, so I wrote a short story, which later became a book, my first novel: Breath, Eyes, Memory...Writing for New Youth Connections had given me a voice. My silence was destroyed completely, indefinitely."

After graduating from Clara Barton High School in Brooklyn, New York, Danticat entered Barnard College in New York City, where she graduated Phi Beta Kappa in 1990. Initially, she had intended to study to become a nurse, but her love of writing won out and she received a BA degree in French literature. She received a Master of Fine Arts in Creative Writing from Brown University in 1993.

Danticat is a strong advocate for issues affecting Haitians abroad and at home. In 2009, she lent her voice and words to Poto Mitan: Haitian Women Pillars of the Global Economy, a documentary about the impact of globalization on five women from different generations.

== Personal life ==
Danticat married Fedo Boyer in 2002. She has two daughters, Mira and Leila. Although Danticat resides in the United States, she still considers Haiti home, going there when she can, as she said in a 2009 interview: "...so while I have left Haiti, it's never left me."

== Themes ==
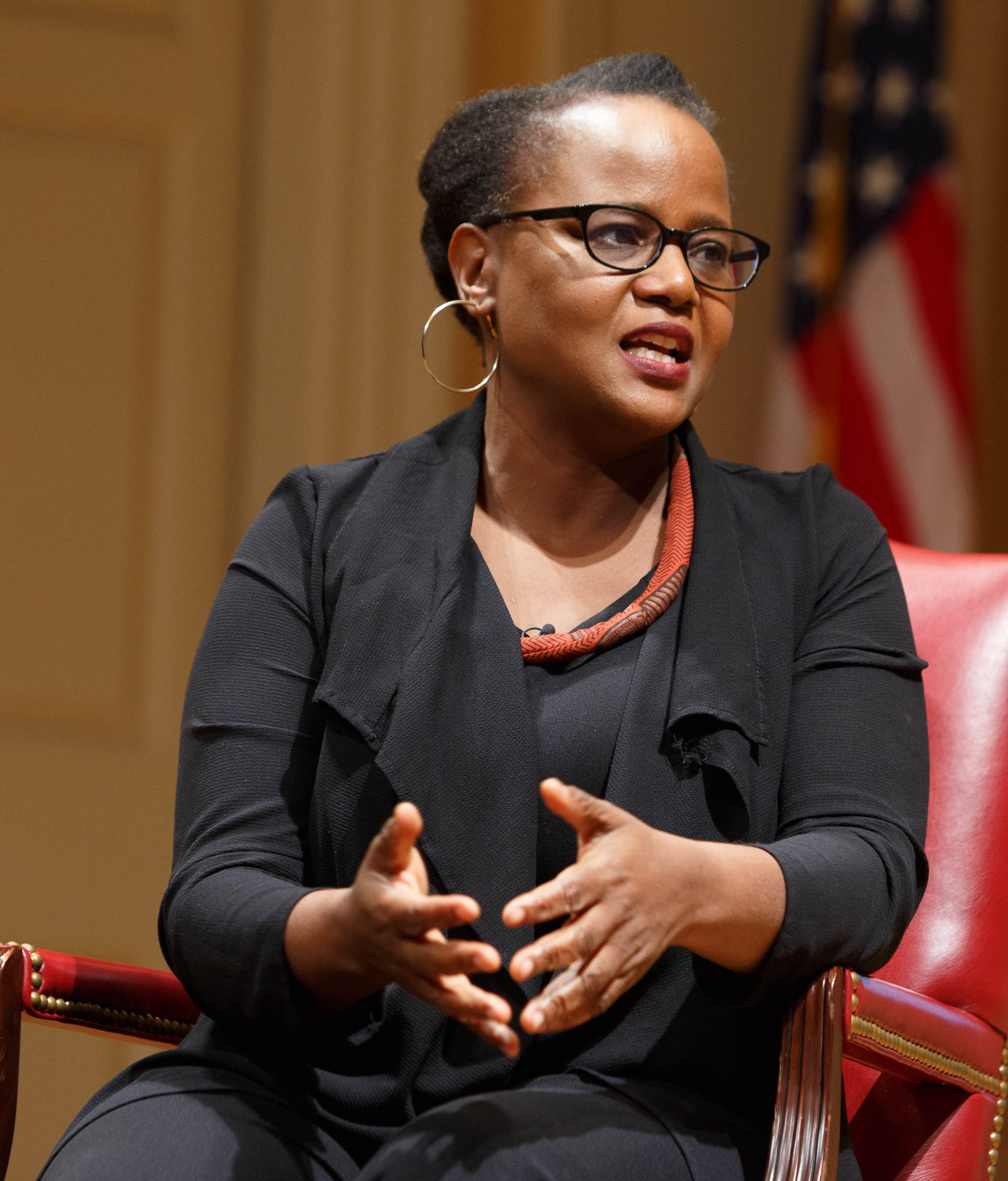
Danticat in 2019

=== Diasporic politics ===
Scholars agree that Danticat manages her relationship with her Haitian history and her bicultural identity through her works by creating a new space within the political sphere. In Breath, Eyes, Memory, she employs the "idea of mobile traditions" as a means of creating new space for Haitian identity in America, one that is neither a "happy hybridity" nor an "unproblematic creolization" of Flatbush Brooklyn (28) [ix]. Danticat's open reference to and acceptance of her Caribbean predecessors, especially through the "grand narratives of the dead iconic fathers of Haitian literature", creates a "new community [...] in luminal extra-national spaces" that "situates her narrative" in a place that is neither "absolute belonging" nor "postcolonial placelessness" (34) [ix]. Suggestive of the Haitian literary movement Indigenism, in which works sought to connect to the land of Haiti and the "plight of the peasant class" (55) [x], Sophie's complex reality in Breath, Eyes, Memory encapsulates the transnational experience (61) [x]. Translations of Breath, Eyes, Memory, especially those in France, contain slight alterations and "clumsy" replacement of creol/Caribbean terms that shift the empowered stance of Danticat's works to one of victimization, mirroring the fight authors face for a new political space in which dual Caribbean identity is accepted (68) [x]. Danticat's short story cycles in Krik? Krak! demonstrates "a symbolic weaving together" of her works and the transnational communities, including "Haitians, immigrants, women, [and] mothers and daughters," that she attempts to unite (75) [xi]. Through her "voicing the intersubjective experience of a community", Danticat distinguishes herself from other Haitian prose authors (73, 76) [xi]. She creates a space for the "voicelessness" of those unable to "speak their individual experience" (76) [xi]. Danticat's short stories uphold an undivided experience, one that politically aligns itself with an "egalitarian regime of rights and the rule of law" (81) [xi]. The political space in which such a single experience can exist is the means through which Danticat's transnational identity and her characters can survive.

Another work of Danticat's is her travel narrative After the Dance: A Walk through Carnival in Jacmel, Haiti (2002). She believes it provides readers with an inside look and feel of Haiti's cultural legacy, practices related to Lent, its Carnival, and the Haitian Revolution. She embarks on a journey through her work to recover the lost cultural markers of Haiti while also being marked by the Haitian geopolitical privilege and by her own privilege of mobility. Due to her active traveling privilege, she considered herself an "outsider" of Jacmel even though she did originate from Haiti. She explains: "This is the first time I will be an active reveler at a carnival in Haiti. I am worried that such an admission would appear strange for someone for whom carnival is one of life's passions...As a child living in Haiti...I had never been allowed to 'join the carnival' ... it was considered not safe for me...Since I had an intense desire to join the carnival as some peculiar American children have of joining the circus, my uncle for years spun frightening tales around it to keep me away." She said in her narrative of going back to Jacmel, "I was still wearing my own mask of a distant observer." Because of this, she advises her reader to observe her work from the perspective of a diasporic returnee rather than of an insider.

== Critical reception ==
Edwidge Danticat is an author, creator, conqueror of dimensions and participant in multiple forms of storytelling. The New York Times has remarked on Danticat's ability to create a "moving portrait and a vivid illustration" as an "accomplished novelist and memoirist". The New Yorker has featured Danticat's short stories and essays on multiple occasions, and regularly reviews and critiques her work. Her writing is much anthologized, including in 2019's New Daughters of Africa (edited by Margaret Busby).

Danticat's creative branching out has included filmmaking, short stories, and most recently children's literature. Mama's Nightingale was written to share the story of Haitian immigrants and family separation. The book combines Danticat's storytelling abilities and work by accomplished artist Leslie Staub. Published in 2015 by Penguin Random House, the children's book tells "a touching tale of parent-child separation and immigration...with stirring illustrations...and shows how every child has the power to make a difference." A review in The New York Times said that Mama's Nightingale "will inspire not just empathy for the struggles of childhood immigration, but admiration" of Danticat and Staub, too.

In other creative pursuits, Danticat has worked on two films, Poto Mitan and Girl Rising. The latter received a large amount of press, largely due to the star power involved with the film (including Anne Hathaway, Chloë Grace Moretz, Liam Neeson, Meryl Streep, Alicia Keys and Kerry Washington). In the film, Danticat was tasked with narrating the story of Wadley from Haiti. Girl Rising was defined by The Washington Post as "a lengthy, highly effective PSA designed to kickstart a commitment to getting proper education for all young women, all over the globe".

In Create Dangerously: The Immigrant Artist at Work, Danticat tells her own story as a part of the Haitian diaspora. Create Dangerously was inspired by author Albert Camus's lecture "Create Dangerously" and his experience as an author and creator who defined his art as "a revolt against everything fleeting and unfinished in the world". In Create Dangerously, Danticat is admired for "writing about tragedies and vanished cultures" and how "she accepts that by some accident she exists and has the power to create, so she does." NPR positively reviewed Create Dangerously and the journey through "looming loss [which] makes every detail and person to whom we are introduced more luminous and precious." It was chosen by University of Kansas as the 2018–19 Common Book, which is distributed to all first-year students at the university.

Danticat published her first novel at the age of 25 in 1994, since when she has been acclaimed by critics and audience readers alike. Among her best-known books are Breath, Eyes, Memory (1994), Krik? Krak! (1996), The Dew Breaker (2004), Brother, I'm Dying (2007) and (1994). Each of these works has won awards, including the National Book Award, The Story Prize, and the National Books Critic Circle Award. Danticat usually writes about the different lives of people living in Haiti and the United States, using her own life as inspiration for her novels, typically highlighting themes of violence, class, economic troubles, gender disparities, and family.

The Dew Breaker is a collection of short stories that can either be read together or separately, and detail the intermingled lives of different people in Haiti and New York. Writing in The New York Times, Michiko Kakutani said: "Each tale in 'Dew Breaker' can stand on its own beautifully made story, but they come together as jigsaw-puzzle pieces to create a picture of this man's terrible history and his and his victims' afterlife." It was rated four out of five stars by Goodreads. Brother, I'm Dying is an autobiographical novel that tells her story of being in Haiti and moving to the United States, falling in love, and having a child. This is one of Danticat's best-rated books and was named Top-10 African American Non-fiction Books by Booklist in 2008. For Jess Row of The New York Times, it is "giving us a memoir whose cleareyed prose and unflinching adherence to the facts conceal an astringent undercurrent of melancholy, a mixture of homesickness and homelessness". Krik? Krak! is a collection of short stories of women in Haiti, their trials and tribulations, which The Washington Post Book World called: "virtually flawless. If the news from Haiti is too painful to read, read this book instead and understand the place more deeply than you ever thought possible." Finally, Breath, Eyes, Memory was Danticat's first novel. It tells the story of a girl, a child of rape, as she moves from Haiti to New York City and discovering the traumatic experience her mother endured, and many other women did. This book was chosen for Oprah's Book Club in 1998 and also received four out of five stars on Goodreads. Oprah said it had "vibrant imagery and narrative grace that bear witness to her people's suffering and courage."

== Awards and honors ==
Danticat has won fiction awards from Essence and Seventeen magazines, was named "1 of 20 people in their twenties who will make a difference" in Harper's Bazaar, was featured in The New York Times Magazine as one of "30 under 30" people to watch, and was called one of the "15 Gutsiest Women of the Year" by Jane magazine.

=== Honors ===
- 1995: Woman of Achievement Award, Barnard College
- 1996: Granta magazine's Best Young American Novelists
- 1996: Lila Wallace-Reader's Digest Writers' Awards
- 2009: MacArthur Fellows Program Genius Grant
- 2009: Nicolas Guillen Philosophical Literature Prize, Caribbean Philosophical Association
- 2011: Langston Hughes Medal, City College of New York
- 2012: Smith College Honorary Degree
- 2013: Yale University Honorary Degree
- 2014: PEN Oakland – Josephine Miles Literary Award
- 2017: University of the West Indies Honorary Doctor of Letters (DLitt)
- 2018: Neustadt International Prize for Literature
- 2018: Presidents Award, St. Martin Book Fair.
- 2019: St. Louis Literary Award, St. Louis University
- 2020: Vilcek Prize in Literature

=== Literary awards ===
- 1994: Fiction Award The Caribbean Writer
- 1994: Pushcart Prize for "Between the Pool and the Gardenias"
- 1995: National Book Award for Fiction finalist for Krik? Krak!
- 1999: American Book Award for The Farming of Bones
- 1999: Flaiano Literature Prize
- 1999: Super Flaiano of Literature for The Farming of Bones
- 2005: Anisfield-Wolf Book Award for The Dew Breaker
- 2005: The Story Prize for The Dew Breaker
- 2007: National Book Award for Nonfiction finalist for Brother, I'm Dying
- 2007: National Book Critics Circle Award for Nonfiction for Brother, I'm Dying
- 2008: Dayton Literary Peace Prize for Brother, I'm Dying
- 2008: Hurston/Wright Legacy Award for Brother, I'm Dying
- 2011: OCM Bocas Prize for Caribbean Literature for Create Dangerously
- 2014: Andrew Carnegie Medal for Excellence in Fiction, shortlist for Claire of the Sea Light
- 2019: National Book Critics Circle Award for Fiction for Everything Inside
- 2020: The Story Prize for Everything Inside

== Works ==
=== Novels ===
- Breath, Eyes, Memory (1994)
- The Farming of Bones (1998)
- The Dew Breaker (2004)
- Claire of the Sea Light (2013)
- Dèy (2026)

=== Short story collections ===
- Krik? Krak! (1995)
- Everything Inside (2019)

=== Children/Youth ===
- Behind the Mountains (young adult novel, 2002)
- Anacaona: Golden Flower, Haiti, 1490 (young adult novel, 2005)
- The Last Mapou (children's novel, January 2013)
- Untwine (young adult novel, October 2015)

=== Edited anthologies ===
- The Butterfly's Way (anthology editor)
- Best American Essays, 2011 (anthology editor, October 2011)
- Haiti Noir 2: The Classics (anthology editor, January 2014)

=== Nonfiction ===
- After the Dance: A Walk Through Carnival in Jacmel, Haiti (travel book, 2002)
- Brother, I'm Dying (memoir/social criticism, 2007)
- Create Dangerously: The Immigrant Artist at Work (essay collection, 2010)
- Eight Days: A Story of Haiti (picture book, 2010)
- Tent Life: Haiti (essay contributor, 2011)
- Haiti Noir (anthology editor, 2011)
- Mama's Nightingale (picture book, 2015)
- The Art of Death (biography, 2017)
- My Mommy Medicine (picture book, 2019)
- We're Alone (essay collection, 2024)

=== Film ===
- Poto Mitan – Writer/Narrator, 2009
- Girl Rising (Haiti) – Writer, 2013

=== Translations into English ===
- Jacques Stephen Alexis – L'Espace d'un cillement (1959). In the Flicker of an Eyelid, trans. Carrol F. Coates and Edwidge Danticat (2002).

== See also ==
- Caribbean literature
- Postcolonial literature
