= 36th NAACP Image Awards =

American entertainment awards for 2004 works

- Date: March 19, 2005
- Site: Dorothy Chandler Pavilion, Los Angeles, California
- Hosted by: Chris Tucker
- Official website: NAACPImageAwards.net

Highlights
- Best Picture: Ray
- Best Comedy Series: The Bernie Mac Show
- Best Drama Series: Law & Order

Television coverage
- Network: Fox

The 36th NAACP Image Awards ceremony, presented by the National Association for the Advancement of Colored People (NAACP), honored outstanding representations and achievements of people of color in motion pictures, television, music, and literature during the 2004 calendar year. The ceremony took place on March 19, 2005 and aired on Fox afew days later on March 25, 2005. It was hosted by Chris Tucker.

Oprah Winfrey was inducted into the NAACP Image Award Hall of Fame Award. Barack Obama was honored with the Chairman's Award for his success at the 2004 United States Senate election in Illinois. After his performance Prince received the Vanguard Award.

In this year, a new award for Outstanding Independent or Foreign Motion Picture was bestowed for the very first time, which was won by the film adaption of the T. D. Jakes novel Woman Thou Art Loosed.

The following is a listing of nominees, with winners in bold:

== Special awards ==
Barack Obama received the Chairman's Award.

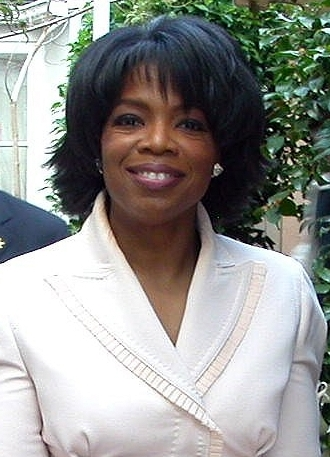
Oprah Winfrey was inducted into the Hall of Fame.

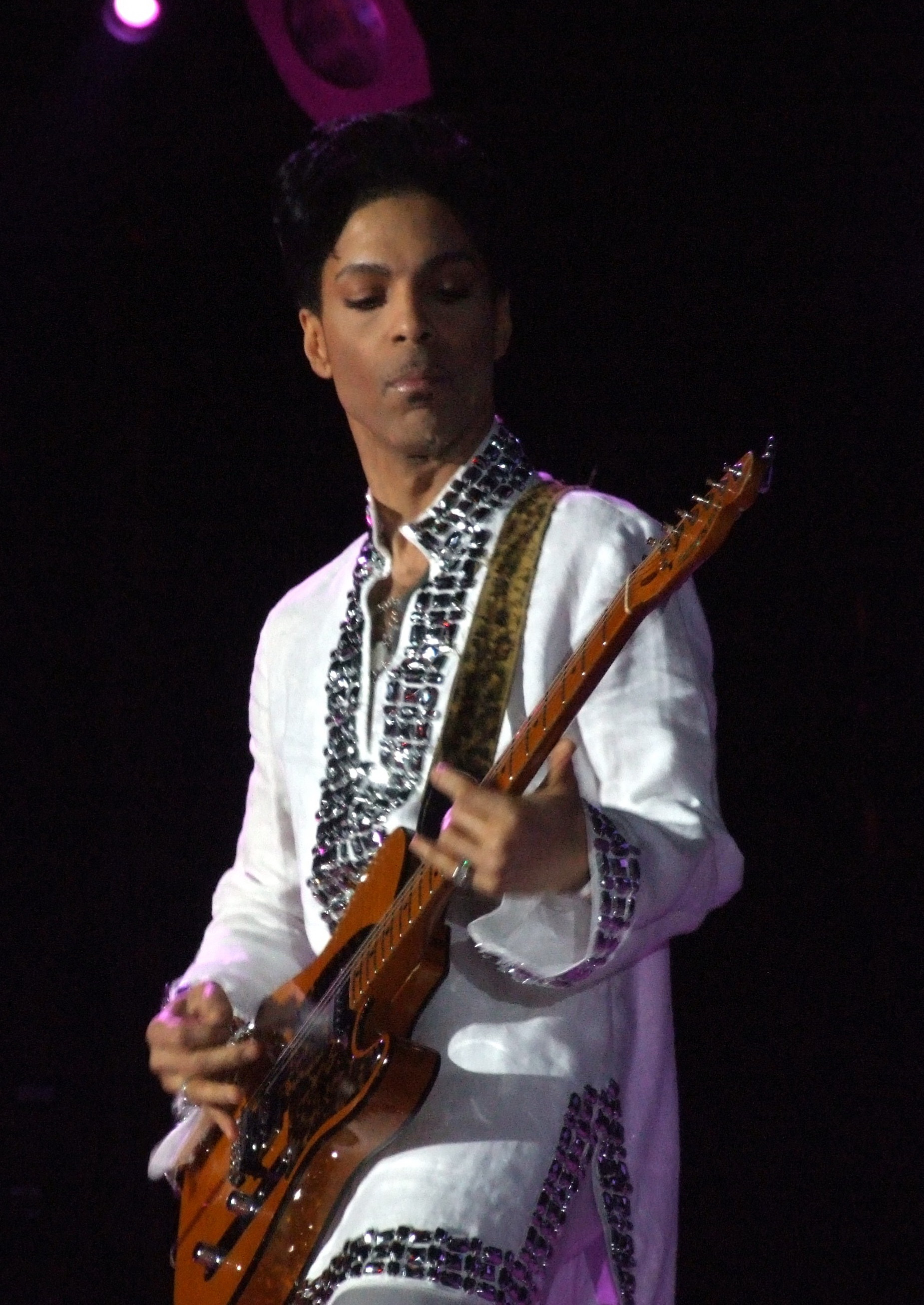
Prince was honored with the Vanguard Award.

Chairman's Award
- **Barack Obama**
Hall of Fame
- **Oprah Winfrey**
Vanguard Award
- **Prince**

== Winners and nominees ==
=== Motion Picture ===
Outstanding Motion Picture	Outstanding Independent or Foreign Motion Picture
**Ray**; Collateral; Fahrenheit 9/11; Hotel Rwanda; Man on Fire	**Woman Thou Art Loosed**; Baadasssss!; House of Flying Daggers; Maria Full of Grace; Moolaadé
Outstanding Actor in a Motion Picture	Outstanding Actress in a Motion Picture
**Jamie Foxx – Ray**; Don Cheadle – Hotel Rwanda; Mario Van Peebles – Baadasssss!; Denzel Washington – Man on Fire; Will Smith – I, Robot	**Kerry Washington – Ray**; Angela Bassett – Mr. 3000; Kimberly Elise – Woman Thou Art Loosed; Gabrielle Union – Breakin' All the Rules; Irma P. Hall – The Ladykillers
Outstanding Supporting Actor in a Motion Picture	Outstanding Supporting Actress in a Motion Picture
**Morgan Freeman – Million Dollar Baby**; Don Cheadle – Ocean's Twelve; Clifton Powell – Ray; C.J. Sanders – Ray; Jamie Foxx – Collateral	**Regina King – Ray**; Loretta Devine – Woman Thou Art Loosed; Sophie Okonedo – Hotel Rwanda; Jada Pinkett Smith – Collateral; Sharon Warren – Ray

=== Television ===
==== Drama ====
Outstanding Drama Series
**Law & Order**; Kevin Hill; Soul Food; The Wire; ER
Outstanding Actor in a Drama Series	Outstanding Actress in a Drama Series
**Taye Diggs** **– Kevin Hill**; Gary Dourdan – CSI: Crime Scene Investigation; Hill Harper – CSI: NY; Steve Harris – The Practice; Jesse L. Martin – Law & Order	**Nia Long** **– Third Watch**; Vivica A. Fox – 1-800-Missing; Nicole Ari Parker – Soul Food; Malinda Williams – Soul Food; Vanessa A. Williams – Soul Food
Outstanding Supporting Actor in a Drama Series	Outstanding Supporting Actress in a Drama Series
**Mekhi Phifer** **– ER**; Idris Elba – The Wire; Omar Epps – House; Darrin Henson – Soul Food; Dulé Hill – The West Wing	**Khandi Alexander** **– CSI: Miami**; Diahann Carroll – Soul Food; Pam Grier – The L Word; Jasmine Guy – Dead Like Me; Sonja Sohn – The Wire

Comedy

Outstanding Comedy Series
**The Bernie Mac Show**; Chappelle's Show; Half & Half; Girlfriends; My Wife and Kids
Outstanding Actor in a Comedy Series	Outstanding Actress in a Comedy Series
**Bernie Mac** **– The Bernie Mac Show**; Flex Alexander – One on One; Dave Chappelle – Chappelle's Show; George Lopez – The George Lopez Show; Damon Wayans – My Wife and Kids	**Mo'Nique** **– The Parkers**; Eve – Eve; Tisha Campbell-Martin – My Wife and Kids; Tracee Ellis Ross – Girlfriends; Kellita Smith – The Bernie Mac Show
Outstanding Supporting Actor in a Comedy Series	Outstanding Supporting Actress in a Comedy Series
**Reggie Hayes** **– Girlfriends**; Chico Benymon – Half & Half; Donald Faison – Scrubs; Blair Underwood – Sex and the City; Dorien Wilson – The Parkers	**Camille Winbush** **– The Bernie Mac Show**; Essence Atkins – Half & Half; Telma Hopkins – Half & Half; Valarie Pettiford – Half & Half; Wanda Sykes – Curb Your Enthusiasm

==== Television Movie, Limited-Series or Dramatic Special ====
Outstanding Television Movie, Mini-Series or Dramatic Special
**Something the Lord Made**; Crown Heights; Justice; Redemption; Walking on Sunshine
Outstanding Actor in a Television Movie, Mini-Series or Dramatic Special	Outstanding Actress in a Television Movie, Mini-Series or Dramatic Special
**Jamie Foxx** **– Redemption: The Stan Tookie Williams Story**; Dulé Hill – 10.5; Flex Alexander – Man in the Mirror: The Michael Jackson Story; Mos Def – Something the Lord Made; Wayne Brady – Going to the Mat	**Lynn Whitfield** **– Redemption: The Stan Tookie Williams Story**; Gabrielle Union – Something the Lord Made; Keke Palmer – The Wool Cap; Tangi Miller – Phantom Force; Tyra Ferrell – NTSB: The Crash of Flight 323

Daytime Drama Series

Outstanding Actor in a Daytime Drama Series	Outstanding Actress in a Daytime Drama Series
**Shemar Moore** **– The Young and the Restless**; Bryton McClure – The Young and the Restless; Keith Hamilton Cobb – The Young and the Restless; Kristoff St. John – The Young and the Restless; Michael B. Jordan – All My Children	**Victoria Rowell** **– The Young and the Restless**; Christel Khalil – The Young and the Restless; Marla Gibbs – Passions; Tonya Lee Williams – The Young and the Restless; Tracey Ross – Passions

==== Overall acting ====
Outstanding Performance by a Youth (Series, Special, Television Movie or Limited-series)
- **Raven-Symoné – That's So Raven**
  - Jo Marie Payton – The Proud Family
  - Kyla Pratt – The Proud Family
  - LeVar Burton – Reading Rainbow
  - Tommy Davidson – The Proud Family

==== Reality and Variety ====
Outstanding News/Information – Series or Special	Outstanding Variety – Series or Special
**Tavis Smiley**; 60 Minutes: The Murder of Emmett Till; Beah: A Black Woman Speaks; Brown vs. Board of Education Anniversary; Judge Mathis	**Genius: A Night for Ray Charles**; American Idol season 3; Chris Rock: Never Scared comedy special; Dave Chappelle: For What It's Worth; Russell Simmons Presents Def Poetry

=== Recording ===
Outstanding Album
**Musicology – Prince**; Destiny Fulfilled – Destiny's Child; The College Dropout – Kanye West; The Dana Owens Album – Queen Latifah; Confessions – Usher
Outstanding Male Artist	Outstanding Female Artist
**Usher – Confessions**; Anthony Hamilton – Comin from Where I'm From: "Charlene"; Jay-Z – The Black Album: "99 Problems"; Mos Def – The New Danger; Prince – Musicology	**Fantasia** – **Free Yourself**; Janet Jackson – Damita Jo; Jill Scott – Beautifully Human: Words and Sounds Vol. 2; Patti LaBelle – Timeless Journey; Queen Latifah – The Dana Owens Album
Outstanding Duo or Group	Outstanding New Artist
**Destiny's Child – Destiny Fulfilled**; Ray Charles and Gladys Knight – Genius Loves Company; The O'Jays – Imagination; New Edition – One Love; The Roots – The Tipping Point	**Kanye West – The College Dropout**; Fantasia – Free Yourself; John Legend – Get Lifted; Mario Winans – Hurt No More; Van Hunt – Van Hunt
Outstanding Song	Outstanding Music Video
**"If I Ain't Got You" – Alicia Keys**; "Charlene" – Anthony Hamilton; "Golden" – Jill Scott; "Jesus Walks" – Kanye West; "Yeah!" – Usher, Ludacris and Lil Jon	**"If I Ain't Got You" – Alicia Keys**; "Golden" – Jill Scott; "Jesus Walks" – Kanye West; "My Boo" – Usher and Alicia Keys; "Yeah!" – Usher, Ludacris and Lil Jon
Outstanding Gospel Artist	Outstanding Jazz Artist
**Ben Harper and The Blind Boys of Alabama – There Will Be a Light**; Bishop Eddie Long – Spirit and Truth; Fred Hammond – Somethin' 'Bout Love; Kierra "Kiki" Sheard – I Owe You; Smokie Norful – Nothing Without You	**Nancy Wilson** – **R.S.V.P. (Rare Songs, Very Personal)**; Gerald Albright – Kickin' it Up; Regina Belle – Lazy Afternoon; Al Jarreau – Accentuate the Positive; Wynton Marsalis Quartet – The Magic Hour

=== Literature ===
Outstanding Literary Work – Fiction	Outstanding Literary Work – Nonfiction
**Woman, Thou Art Loosed! The Novel – Bishop T. D. Jakes**; Birth of a Nation: A Comic Novel – Aaron McGruder and Reginald Hudlin; Drive Me Crazy – Eric Jerome Dickey; Ida B. – Karen E. Quinones Miller; Now is the Time to Open Your Heart – Alice Walker	**Hallelujah! The Welcome Table – Maya Angelou**; America Behind the Color Line – Henry Louis Gates Jr.; Children of the Movement – John Blake; Afeni Shakur: Evolution of a Revolutionary – Jasmine Guy; God Has a Dream: A Vision of Hope for Our Time – Desmond Tutu
Outstanding Literary Work – Children
**The 1963 Civil Rights March – Scott Ingram**; African Princess: The Amazing Lives of Africa's Royal Women – Joyce Hansen; Ellington Was Not a Street – Ntozake Shange; Langston's Train Ride – Robert Burleigh; Maya's World: Angelina of Italy – Maya Angelou
