= NAACP Image Award for Outstanding Supporting Actor in a Comedy Series =

American television award

This article lists the winners and nominees for the NAACP Image Award for Outstanding Supporting Actor in a Comedy Series. Currently Cedric the Entertainer holds the record for most wins in this category with five.

== Winners and nominees ==
Winners are listed first and highlighted in bold.

=== 1990s ===
Year	Actor	Series	Ref
1996
1996	**Alfonso Ribeiro**	**The Fresh Prince of Bel-Air**	
1996	John Amos	In the House	
1996	Thomas Mikal Ford	Martin	
1996	Daryl Mitchell	The John Larroquette Show	
1996	Carl Anthony Payne II	Martin	
1997	—N/a		
1998
1998	**Alfonso Ribeiro**	**In the House**	
1998	Michael Boatman	Spin City	
1998	Doug E. Doug	Cosby	
1998	James Earl Jones	Frasier	
1998	Tim Reid	Sister, Sister	
1999
1999	**Cedric the Entertainer**	**The Steve Harvey Show**	
1999	Michael Boatman	Spin City	
1999	Doug E. Doug	Cosby	
1999	David Alan Grier	Damon	
1999	Alfonso Ribeiro	In the House	

=== 2000s ===
Year	Actor	Series	Ref
2000
2000	**Cedric the Entertainer**	**The Steve Harvey Show**	
2000	Michael Boatman	Spin City	
2000	Doug E. Doug	Cosby	
2000	Robert Guillaume	Sports Night	
2000	Tim Reid	Sister, Sister	
2001
2001	**Cedric the Entertainer**	**The Steve Harvey Show**	
2001	Michael Boatman	Spin City	
2001	John Henton	The Hughleys	
2001	Merlin Santana	The Steve Harvey Show	
2001	William Lee Scott	The Steve Harvey Show	
2002
2002	**Cedric the Entertainer**	**The Steve Harvey Show**	
2002	Taye Diggs	Ally McBeal	
2002	John Henton	The Hughleys	
2002	Merlin Santana	The Steve Harvey Show	
2002	Dorien Wilson	The Parkers	
2003
2003	**Cedric the Entertainer**	**The Proud Family**	
2003	Michael Boatman	Arliss	
2003	David Alan Grier	Life with Bonnie	
2003	Ving Rhames	The Proud Family	
2003	Jeremy Suarez	The Bernie Mac Show	
2004
2004	**Dorien Wilson**	**The Parkers**	
2004	Chico Benymon	Half & Half	
2004	George O. Gore II	My Wife and Kids	
2004	Jeremy Suarez	The Bernie Mac Show	
2004	Blair Underwood	Sex and the City	
2005
2005	**Reggie Hayes**	**Girlfriends**	
2005	Chico Benymon	Half & Half	
2005	Donald Faison	Scrubs	
2005	Blair Underwood	Sex and the City	
2005	Dorien Wilson	The Parkers	
2006
2006	**Reggie Hayes**	**Girlfriends**	
2006	Chico Benymon	Half & Half	
2006	Mehcad Brooks	Desperate Housewives	
2006	Terry Crews	Everybody Hates Chris	
2006	Kenan Thompson	Saturday Night Live	
2007
2007	**Reggie Hayes**	**Girlfriends**	
2007	Terry Crews	Everybody Hates Chris	
2007	Antonio Fargas	Everybody Hates Chris	
2007	Romany Malco	Weeds	
2007	Victor Williams	King of Queens	
2008
2008	**Lance Gross**	**Tyler Perry's House of Payne**	
2008	Terry Crews	Everybody Hates Chris	
2008	Romany Malco	Weeds	
2008	Tracy Morgan	30 Rock	
2008	Blair Underwood	The New Adventures of Old Christine	
2009
2009	**Lance Gross**	**Tyler Perry's House of Payne**	
2009	Dulé Hill	Psych	
2009	Tracy Morgan	30 Rock	
2009	Doc Shaw	Tyler Perry's House of Payne	
2009	Blair Underwood	The New Adventures of Old Christine	

=== 2010s ===
Year	Actor	Series	Ref
2010
2010	**Lance Gross**	**Tyler Perry's House of Payne**	
2010	Tracy Morgan	30 Rock	
2010	Lamman Rucker	Meet the Browns	
2010	Larenz Tate	Rescue Me	
2010	Malcolm-Jamal Warner	Sherri	
2011
2011	**Ice Cube**	**Are We There Yet?**	
2011	Lance Gross	Tyler Perry's House of Payne	
2011	Tracy Morgan	30 Rock	
2011	Craig Robinson	The Office	
2011	Lamman Rucker	Meet the Browns	
2012
2012	**Nick Cannon**	**Up All Night**	
2012	Tracy Morgan	30 Rock	
2012	Craig Robinson	The Office	
2012	J. B. Smoove	Curb Your Enthusiasm	
2012	Damon Wayans Jr.	Happy Endings	
2013
2013	**Lance Gross**	**Tyler Perry's House of Payne**	
2013	Aziz Ansari	Parks & Recreation	
2013	Donald Glover	Community	
2013	Tracy Morgan	30 Rock	
2013	Craig Robinson	The Office	
2014
2014	**Morris Chestnut**	**Nurse Jackie**	
2014	Nick Cannon	Real Husbands of Hollywood	
2014	Boris Kodjoe	Real Husbands of Hollywood	
2014	Tracy Morgan	30 Rock	
2014	J. B. Smoove	Real Husbands of Hollywood	
2015
2015	**Laurence Fishburne**	**Black-ish**	
2015	Terry Crews	Brooklyn Nine-Nine	
2015	Boris Kodjoe	Real Husbands of Hollywood	
2015	Marcus Scribner	Black-ish	
2015	Glynn Turman	House of Lies	
2016
2016	**Mike Epps**	**Survivor's Remorse**	
2016	Miles Brown	Black-ish	
2016	Terry Crews	Brooklyn Nine-Nine	
2016	Laurence Fishburne	Black-ish	
2016	David Alan Grier	The Carmichael Show	
2017
2017	**Laurence Fishburne**	**Black-ish**	
2017	Miles Brown	Black-ish	
2017	Tituss Burgess	Unbreakable Kimmy Schmidt	
2017	Deon Cole	Black-ish	
2017	David Alan Grier	The Carmichael Show	
2018
2018	**Jay Ellis**	**Insecure**	
2018	Tituss Burgess	Unbreakable Kimmy Schmidt	
2018	Ernie Hudson	Grace and Frankie	
2018	Omar Miller	Ballers	
2018	John David Washington	Ballers	
2019
2019	**Marcus Scribner**	**Black-ish**	
2019	Tituss Burgess	Unbreakable Kimmy Schmidt	
2019	Jay Ellis	Insecure	
2019	Laurence Fishburne	Black-ish	
2019	John David Washington	Ballers	

=== 2020s ===
Year	Actor	Series	Ref
2020
2020	**Deon Cole**	**Black-ish**	
2020	Andre Braugher	Brooklyn Nine-Nine	
2020	Tituss Burgess	Unbreakable Kimmy Schmidt	
2020	Terry Crews	Brooklyn Nine-Nine	
2020	Laurence Fishburne	Black-ish	
2021
2021	**Deon Cole**	**Black-ish**	
2021	Andre Braugher	Brooklyn Nine-Nine	
2021	Jay Ellis	Insecure	
2021	Laurence Fishburne	Black-ish	
2021	Kenan Thompson	Saturday Night Live	
2022
2022	**Deon Cole**	**Black-ish**	
2022	Andre Braugher	Brooklyn Nine-Nine	
2022	Laurence Fishburne	Black-ish	
2022	Kendrick Sampson	Insecure	
2022	Kenan Thompson	Saturday Night Live	
2023
2023	**Tyler James Williams**	**Abbott Elementary**	
2023	Brian Tyree Henry	Atlanta	
2023	Deon Cole	Black-ish	
2023	Kenan Thompson	Saturday Night Live	
2023	William Stanford Davis	Abbott Elementary	
2024
2024	**William Stanford Davis**	**Abbott Elementary**	
2024	Roy Wood Jr.	The Daily Show	
2024	Tyler Lepley	Harlem	
2024	Kenan Thompson	Saturday Night Live	
2024	Tyler James Williams	Abbott Elementary	
2025
2025	**Damon Wayans Jr.**	**Poppa's House**	
2025	William Stanford Davis	Abbott Elementary	
2025	Giancarlo Esposito	The Gentlemen	
2025	Kenan Thompson	Saturday Night Live	
2025	Tyler James Williams	Abbott Elementary	

== Multiple wins and nominations ==
=== Wins ===
5 wins

- Cedric the Entertainer

4 wins

- Lance Gross

3 wins

- Reggie Hayes
- Deon Cole

2 wins

- Laurence Fishburne
- Alfonso Ribeiro

=== Nominations ===
7 nominations

- Laurence Fishburne
- Tracy Morgan

6 nominations

- Terry Crews

5 nominations

- Michael Boatman
- Cedric the Entertainer
- Deon Cole
- Lance Gross
- Kenan Thompson

4 nominations

- Tituss Burgess
- David Alan Grier
- Blair Underwood

3 nominations

- Chico Benymon
- Andre Braugher
- Doug E. Doug
- Jay Ellis
- Reggie Hayes
- Alfonso Ribeiro
- Craig Robinson
- Dorien Wilson
- William Stanford Davis
- Tyler James Williams

2 nominations

- Miles Brown
- Nick Cannon
- John Henton
- Boris Kodjoe
- Romany Malco
- Tim Reid
- Lamman Rucker
- Merlin Santana
- J. B. Smoove
- Marcus Scribner
- Jeremy Suarez
- John David Washington
- Damon Wayans Jr.
