= 37th NAACP Image Awards =

American entertainment awards for 2005 works

- Date: February 25, 2006
- Site: Shrine Auditorium, Los Angeles, California
- Hosted by: Cuba Gooding Jr.
- Official website: NAACPImageAwards.net

Television coverage
- Network: Fox

The 37th NAACP Image Awards ceremony, presented by the National Association for the Advancement of Colored People (NAACP), honored the best in film, television, music of 2005 and took place on February 25, 2006, at the Shrine Auditorium. The show was televised live on Fox, March 3 at 8 p.m. EST and hosted by Cuba Gooding Jr.

The following is a listing of nominees, with winners in bold:

== Special awards ==
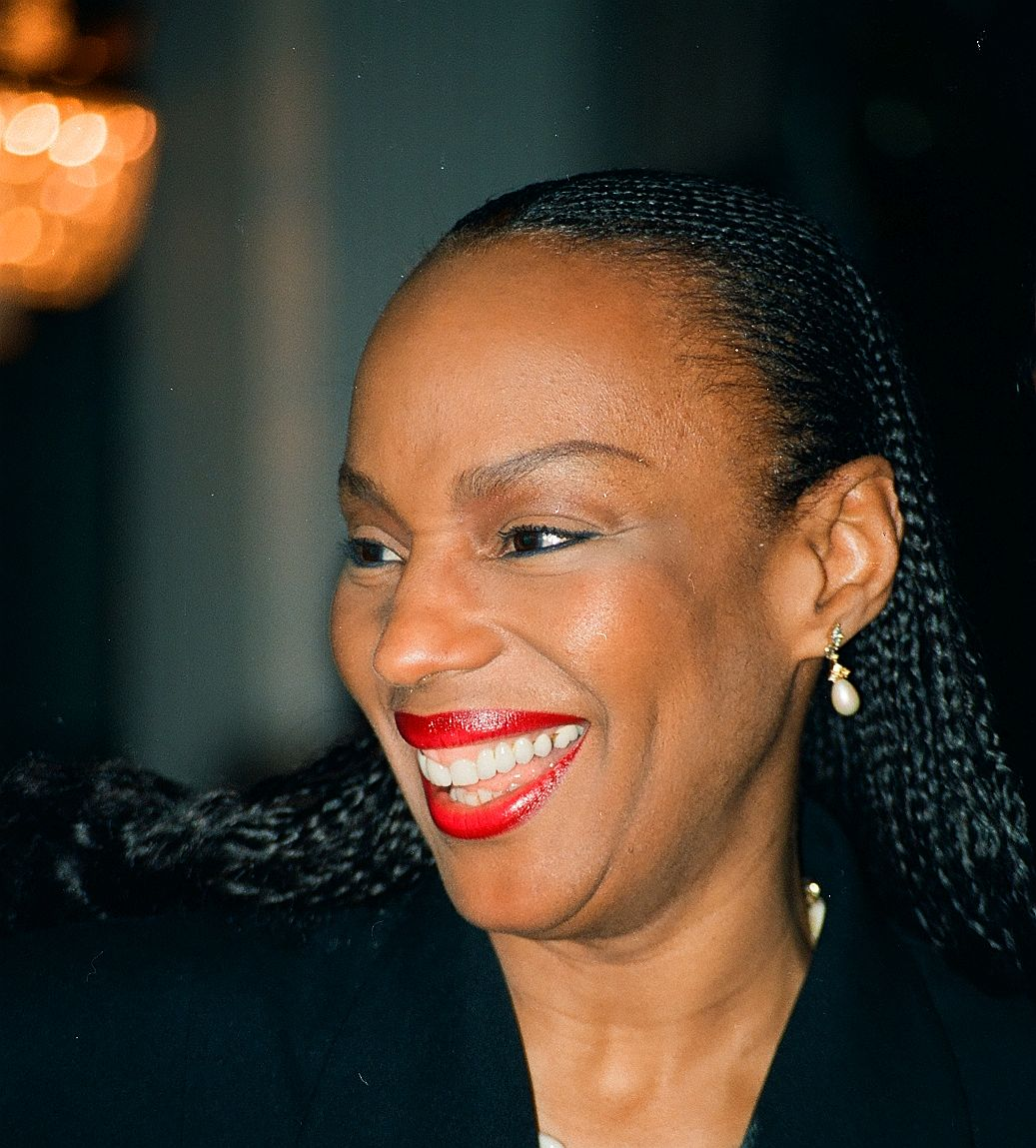
Susan L. Taylor was honored with the President's Award.

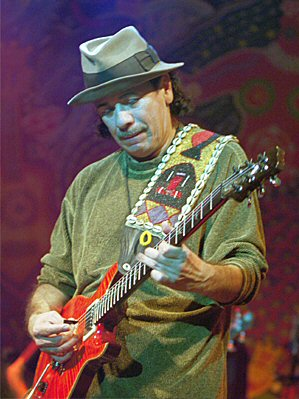
Carlos Santana was inducted into the Hall of Fame Award.

Chairman's Award
- **The Neville Brothers**
President's Award
- **Susan L. Taylor**
Hall of Fame Award
- **Carlos Santana**

== Film ==
Outstanding Motion Picture

- Coach Carter
- **Crash**
- Hitch
- Hustle & Flow
- Diary of a Mad Black Woman

Outstanding Actor in a Motion Picture

- Laurence Fishburne - Assault on Precinct 13
- **Samuel L. Jackson - Coach Carter**
- Shemar Moore - Diary of a Mad Black Woman
- Terrence Howard - Hustle & Flow
- Will Smith - Hitch

Outstanding Actress in a Motion Picture

- **Kimberly Elise - Diary of a Mad Black Woman**
- Queen Latifah - Beauty Shop
- Rosario Dawson - Rent
- Ziyi Zhang - Memoirs of a Geisha
- Zoe Saldaña - Guess Who

Outstanding Supporting Actor in a Motion Picture

- Anthony Anderson - Hustle & Flow
- Chris "Ludacris" Bridges - Crash
- Don Cheadle - Crash
- Larenz Tate - Crash
- **Terrence Howard - Crash**

Outstanding Supporting Actress in a Motion Picture

- Ashanti - Coach Carter
- **Cicely Tyson - Diary of a Mad Black Woman**
- Elise Neal - Hustle & Flow
- Taraji P. Henson - Hustle & Flow
- Thandie Newton - Crash

Outstanding Independent or Foreign Film

- **The Boys of Baraka**
- Cape of Good Hope
- The Constant Gardener
- Mad Hot Ballroom
- Syriana

Outstanding Directing in a Feature Film/Television Movie

- George C. Wolfe – Lackawanna Blues
- **John Singleton – Four Brothers**
- Malcolm Lee – Roll Bounce
- Thomas Carter – Coach Carter
- Tim Story – Fantastic Four

== Television ==
Outstanding Comedy Series

- The Bernie Mac Show
- The Boondocks
- **Everybody Hates Chris**
- Girlfriends
- Half & Half

Outstanding Actor in a Comedy Series

- **Bernie Mac - The Bernie Mac Show**
- Donald Faison - Scrubs
- George Lopez - George Lopez
- Omar Gooding - Barbershop: The Series
- Tyler James Williams - Everybody Hates Chris

Outstanding Actress in a Comedy Series

- Holly Robinson Peete - Love, Inc.
- Jill Marie Jones - Girlfriends
- Rachel True - Half & Half
- **Tichina Arnold - Everybody Hates Chris**
- Tracee Ellis Ross - Girlfriends

Outstanding Supporting Actor in a Comedy Series

- Chico Benymon - Half & Half
- Kenan Thompson - Saturday Night Live
- Mehcad Brooks - Desperate Housewives
- **Reggie Hayes - Girlfriends**
- Terry Crews - Everybody Hates Chris

Outstanding Supporting Actress in a Comedy Series

- **Camille Winbush - The Bernie Mac Show**
- Kellita Smith - The Bernie Mac Show
- Telma Hopkins - Half & Half
- Valarie Pettiford - Half & Half
- Wanda Sykes - Curb Your Enthusiasm

Outstanding Drama Series

- Commander In Chief
- CSI: Miami
- **Grey's Anatomy**
- House
- Lost

Outstanding Actor in a Drama Series

- Hill Harper - CSI: NY
- Ice-T - Law & Order: Special Victims Unit
- **Isaiah Washington - Grey's Anatomy**
- Jesse L. Martin - Law & Order
- Omar Epps - House

Outstanding Actress in a Drama Series

- CCH Pounder - The Shield
- Khandi Alexander - CSI: Miami
- Kimberly Elise - Close to Home
- Marianne Jean-Baptiste - Without A Trace
- **Vivica A. Fox - Missing**

Outstanding Supporting Actor in a Drama Series

- Dennis Haysbert - 24
- **Gary Dourdan - CSI: Crime Scene Investigation**
- Harry Lennix - Commander in Chief
- James Pickens Jr. - Grey's Anatomy
- Mekhi Phifer - ER

Outstanding Supporting Actress in a Drama Series

- Aisha Tyler - 24
- Chandra Wilson - Grey's Anatomy
- Kerry Washington - Boston Legal
- Pam Grier - The L Word
- **S. Epatha Merkerson - Law & Order**

Outstanding Television Movie, Mini-Series, or Dramatic Special

- **Lackawanna Blues**
- Mississippi Justice
- Sometimes in April
- The Reading Room
- Their Eyes Were Watching God

Outstanding Actor in a Television Movie, Mini-Series, or Dramatic Special

- Idris Elba - Sometimes in April
- Jeffrey Wright - Lackawanna Blues
- Michael Ealy - Their Eyes Were Watching God
- Ruben Santiago-Hudson - Their Eyes Were Watching God
- **Terrence Dashon Howard - Lackawanna Blues**

Outstanding Actress in a Television Movie, Mini-Series, or Dramatic Special

- Carmen Ejogo - Lackawanna Blues
- Halle Berry - Their Eyes Were Watching God
- Macy Gray - Lackawanna Blues
- Rosie Perez - Lackawanna Blues
- **S. Epatha Merkerson - Lackawanna Blues**

Outstanding Actor in a Daytime Drama Series

- Antonio Sabato Jr. - The Bold and the Beautiful
- Bryton McClure - The Young and the Restless
- Kristoff St. John - The Young and the Restless
- Michael B. Jordan - All My Children
- **Shemar Moore - The Young and the Restless**

Outstanding Actress in a Daytime Drama Series

- Christel Khalil - The Young and the Restless
- Marla Gibbs - Passions
- Tonya Lee Williams - The Young and the Restless
- Tracey Ross - Passions
- **Victoria Rowell - The Young and the Restless**

Outstanding Television News, Talk, or Information (Series or Special)

- CNN Coverage: Honoring Rosa Parks
- Judge Mathis
- **Tavis Smiley**
- The Tyra Banks Show
- Unforgivable Blackness: The Rise and Fall of Jack Johnson

Outstanding Variety (Series or Special)

- 2005 Black Movie Awards – A Celebration of Black Cinema: Past, Present, and Future
- 77th Academy Awards
- **BET Awards 2005**
- Mo'Nique's Fat Chance
- Russell Simmons Presents Def Poetry

Outstanding Performance in a Youth/Children's Series or Special

- Jo Marie Payton – The Proud Family Movie
- Kevin Clash – Sesame Street
- Kyla Pratt – The Proud Family Movie
- **Raven-Symoné – That's So Raven**
- Tommy Davidson – The Proud Family Movie

Outstanding Directing in a Dramatic Series

- Janice Cooke-Leonard – Charmed
- Janice Cooke-Leonard – One Tree Hill
- Janice Cooke-Leonard – Summerland
- **Paris Barclay – Cold Case**
- Phillip G. Atwell – The Shield

Outstanding Directing in a Comedy Series

- Eric Dean Seaton – That's So Raven
- James D. Wilcox – My Wife & Kids
- Ken Whittingham – Everybody Hates Chris
- Mattie C. Caruthers – My Wife & Kids
- **Millicent Shelton – The Bernie Mac Show**

== Literature ==
Outstanding Literary Work – Fiction

- 72 Hour Hold – Bebe Moore Campbell
- Fledging – Octavia Butler
- **Breaking the Cycle – Zane**
- Cinnamon Kiss – Walter Mosley
- Genevieve: A Novel – Eric Jerome Dickey

Outstanding Literary Work – Non-Fiction

- Blue Rage, Black Redemption: A Memoir by Stanley Tookie Williams – Stanley Tookie Williams
- **Is Bill Cosby Right? Or Has The Black Middle Class Lost Its Mind? – Michael Eric Dyson**
- The Autobiography of Medgar Evers: A Hero's Life and Legacy Revealed Through His Writings, Letters and Speeches – Edited by Myrlie Evers-Williams and Manning Marable
- 50 Years After Brown: The State of Black Equality in America – Anthony Asadullah Samad
- Winning The Race: Beyond The Crisis In Black America – John McWhorter

Outstanding Literary Work – Children's

- **Girls Hold Up This World – Jada Pinkett Smith**
- I Can Make A Difference – Marian Wright Edelman
- The School Is Not White! A True Story of the Civil Rights Movement – Doreen Rappaport
- Honey Baby Sugar Child – Alice Faye Duncan
- Please, Puppy, Please – Spike Lee

== Music ==
Outstanding New Artist

- Bobby Valentino
- **Chris Brown**
- Keyshia Cole
- Leela James
- Omarion

Outstanding Male Artist

- Common
- **Jamie Foxx**
- Kanye West
- Kem
- Stevie Wonder

Outstanding Female Artist

- **Alicia Keys**
- India.Arie
- Mariah Carey
- Mary J. Blige
- Toni Braxton

Outstanding Duo or Group

- The Black Eyed Peas
- **Destiny's Child**
- Earth, Wind, & Fire
- Floetry
- Ray Charles and Various Artists

Outstanding Jazz Artist

- Billy Miles
- Jermaine Gardner
- Mike Phillips
- **Najee**
- Onaje Allan Gumbs

Outstanding Gospel Artist (Traditional or Contemporary)

- CeCe Winans – Purified
- Donnie McClurkin – Psalms, Hymns, & Spiritual Songs
- Kirk Franklin – Hero
- Mary Mary – Mary Mary
- **Yolanda Adams – Day by Day**

Outstanding Music Video

- **Alicia Keys – Unbreakable**
- Common – Testify
- Destiny's Child – Stand Up For Love
- Kanye West – Diamonds From Sierra Leone
- Mariah Carey – We Belong Together

Outstanding Song

- Be Without You – Mary J. Blige
- Diamonds From Sierra Leone – Kanye West
- I Can’t Stop Loving You – Kem
- **Unbreakable – Alicia Keys**
- We Belong Together – Mariah Carey

Outstanding Album

- Alicia Keys Unplugged – Alicia Keys
- The Breakthrough - Mary J. Blige
- **Emancipation of Mimi – Mariah Carey**
- Late Registration – Kanye West
- So Amazing: An All-Star Tribute to Luther Vandross – Luther Vandross and Various Artists
