= Half & Half =

American television sitcom (2002–2006)

- Genre: Sitcom
- Created by: Jeffrey Klarik
- Starring: Rachel True; Essence Atkins; Chico Benymon; Valarie Pettiford; Telma Hopkins; Alec Mapa
- Theme music composer: Kip Collins; Tone Maceira
- Opening theme: "You and Me", performed by Melonie Daniels
- Composer: Kip Collins
- Country of origin: United States
- Original language: English
- No. of seasons: 4
- No. of episodes: 91

Production
- Executive producers: Yvette Lee Bowser; Jamie Wooten; Arthur A. Davis
- Running time: 21 minutes
- Production companies: Sister Lee Productions; Eye Productions

Original release
- Network: UPN
- Release: September 23, 2002 – May 15, 2006

Related
- Living Single

Half & Half is an American television sitcom created by Jeffrey Klarik and executive-produced by Yvette Lee Bowser through her Sister Lee Productions banner that aired on UPN from September 23, 2002, to May 15, 2006 (related to the Fox comedy show, Living Single that aired out in 1993 until 1998). It was co-produced by CBS Studios under one of its former aliases, Eye Productions, Inc.

Set in San Francisco, California, the show centers on the lives of two paternal half-sisters in their early adulthood who were estranged throughout their childhood, and are finally developing a close relationship. The show was the second-most-watched on UPN's Monday night line-up (next to Girlfriends) and fourth overall on the network. The series was almost renewed for a fifth season by UPN's successor network, The CW, but due to several circumstances — including the network's contractual obligation to pick up Reba, the last-minute renewal of All of Us, and the pick-up of the Girlfriends spin-off The Game — the series was left off the network's Autumn 2006 schedule and canceled. Outside of the United States, the series has aired in reruns on Global TV in Canada, Trouble in the United Kingdom and in local syndication channels in the United States, including Bounce TV, TV One, Cleo TV, BET Her and Dabl.

The series is available to stream on Paramount+ and Amazon Prime Video.

== Premise ==
The show's plot centers around the lives of half-sisters Mona and Dee Dee Thorne, who slowly become friends when they move into the same San Francisco apt building. Mona is the daughter of Phyllis Thorne, Charles Thorne's first wife, and Dee Dee is Charles' daughter from his second marriage to Deirdre "Big Dee Dee" Thorne. Initially, Mona resents Dee Dee because Dee Dee grew up in a wealthy and privileged household, while Mona and her mother struggled financially. As adults, Mona is more street-smart and cynical, but prone to impulsive decisions while Dee Dee is charming and optimistic, but naïve at times. Throughout the series, the sisters confront their past resentments and learn to lean on each other as they navigate their issues in work, love, and family.

== Cast ==
=== Main ===
- Rachel True as Mona Rose Thorne. The elder of the two sisters and daughter of Phyllis Thorne and Charles Thorne. Mona was primarily raised by Phyllis and grew up resenting Dee Dee for having their father's attention and growing up in a privileged household. As the series progresses, the two become closer and Mona enjoys her role as Dee Dee's big sister. She is cynical, insecure, and prone to impulsive decisions.
- Essence Atkins as Deirdre Chantal "Dee Dee" Thorne, Esq. The younger of the two sisters and daughter of Big Dee Dee LaFontaine Thorne and Charles Thorne. She grew up to be a bossy, materialistic, fashion-savvy woman like her mother, but slowly matures to become a more well-rounded individual under Mona's influence. Throughout the series, she studies at law school and eventually becomes a sports agent.
- Telma Hopkins as Phyllis Thorne. The mixed-race mother of Mona Thorne and the ex-wife of Charles Thorne. She is loving, but overbearing. Being a psychiatrist, she is prone to meddling in Mona's life and often gives advice to Mona and her friends. She has a contentious relationship with Big Dee Dee and initially thinks the worst of Dee Dee as well. As the series progresses, she serves as mother figure for Dee Dee and occasionally gets along with Big Dee Dee.
- Valarie Pettiford as Deirdre "Big Dee Dee" LaFontaine Thorne. The mother of Dee Dee Thorne and Drew Christian Thorne and the current wife of Charles Thorne. She is a superficial fashionista, who can be controlling and prone to dramatics. However, she cares deeply about Dee Dee and eventually blooms to care for Mona as well, often offering advice to the both of them. She has an on-going rivalry with Phyllis, although the two occasionally call a truce.
- Chico Benymon as Andre "Spencer" Williams. Mona's best friend and co-worker, whom she's known since college. The two briefly date throughout the series, but remain on good terms.
- Alec Mapa as Adam Benet. Mona's openly gay assistant who is very nosy and gossipy. He often hits on Spencer and insults Mona on her unfashionable appearance.

=== Recurring ===
- MC Lyte as Kai Owens, Mona's boss
- Obba Babatundé as Charles Thorne, Mona and Dee Dee's father; ex-husband of Phyllis and current husband of Big Dee Dee.
- Estelle Harris as Sophie, Mona's grandmother (and Phyllis' mother), who is white and Jewish.
- Corey Holcomb as Chauncey, Spencer's cousin
- Joey Lawrence as Brett Mahoney
- Coby Bell as Glen Stallworth
- Keith Robinson as Neil Crawford
- Michelle Williams as Naomi Dawson
- Penny Bae Bridges as Young Mona
- Gabby Soleil as Young Dee Dee
- Yvette Nicole Brown as Ceci
- Louis Gossett Jr. as Ray Willis, Spencer's father.
- Suzy Nakamura as Tina
- Lamman Rucker as Chase
- Charles Divins as Lorenzo
- Rowena King as Camille

== Episodes ==
=== Series overview ===
Season	Episodes	Originally released		Rank	Viewers (in millions)
Season	Episodes	First released	Last released	Rank	Viewers (in millions)
1	23	September 23, 2002	May 12, 2003	#138	3.63
2	24	September 15, 2003	May 17, 2004	#174	3.48
3	22	September 20, 2004	May 23, 2005	#135	3.37
4	22	September 19, 2005	May 15, 2006	#136	3.29

=== Season 1 (2002–03) ===
No. overall	No. in season	Title	Directed by	Written by	Original release date	Prod. code	U.S. viewers (millions)
1	1	"The Big Pilot Episode"	Ellen Gittelsohn	Jeffery Klarik	September 23, 2002	100	4.41
Mona, a self-reliant record executive, is set to move into the penthouse apartment that her father has always promised her. But her plans of getting settled in her new apartment come to an end when she learns that her spoiled half-sister Dee Dee and her overbearing mother also lay claim to the apartment. The sisters' relationship is further strained when Dee Dee inadvertently attracts a man for whom Mona was pining.
2	2	"The Big Forget-Me-Not Episode"	Ellen Gittelsohn	Jamie Wooten	September 30, 2002	101	3.96
When Dee Dee befriends Spencer, Mona becomes concerned that her sister is stealing her best friend. Meanwhile, Mona leads Dee Dee and Spencer to believe she is still dating Brian the exterminator although he hasn't called her after their very hot date.
3	3	"The Big Crappy Birthday Episode"	Ellen Gittelsohn	Jay Dyer	October 7, 2002	102	4.38
Dee Dee attempts to get closer to Mona by planning a joint birthday party, reminding Mona of bad memories from their childhood. Meanwhile, Dee Dee unwittingly reveals that Phyllis lied to Mona about things that have shaped her worldview since she was young; and as a birthday gift, Phyllis finally tells Mona the truth.
4	4	"The Big Pimpin' Episode"	Ellen Gittelsohn	David M. Matthews	October 14, 2002	103	4.73
Mona's music-video shoot for a rapper may end in disaster when he refuses to leave the dressing room until he meets Dee Dee. While Mona is pleased with the rapper's newfound enthusiasm for the shoot, she soon begins to worry that he's using Dee Dee. This episode marks the final television appearance of Merlin Santana who was killed three weeks after this episode aired.
5	5	"The Big Dose of Reality Episode"	Ellen Gittelsohn	Carla Banks Waddles	October 21, 2002	104	3.97
In an attempt to win Mona's respect and stop living off her father's largesse, Dee Dee takes a job as a waitress. Meanwhile, Phyllis persuades Mona to try a video-dating service.
6	6	"The Big Award Episode"	Ellen Gittelsohn	Beth Seriff & Geoff Tarson	October 28, 2002	105	4.86
Dee Dee persuades Mona to attend a banquet that's being held in their father's honor, but the experience reminds Mona that she's the odd one out within her dad's "new" family.
7	7	"The Big Sistah Sans Soul Episode"	Ellen Gittelsohn	Winifred Hervey	November 4, 2002	106	4.48
While at a club with Spencer, Mona meets hunky Miles. They hit it off, but their budding romance quickly trips up over matters of taste: For one, she enjoys "Dawson's Creek", while he prefers BET. After a night on the dance floor, where Mona displays her lack of rhythm, Miles breaks up with her for not being "Black enough." In an attempt to win him back, Mona remakes herself into what Dee Dee calls "a Nubian disco queen." Special guest: DMX
8	8	"The Big Ex-pectations Episode"	Ellen Gittelsohn	Bill Fuller & Jim Pond	November 11, 2002	107	4.33
Dee Dee is smitten with her new beau, but the romance sours when she learns that he and Mona dated in high school. Although Mona gives her blessing to the union, she soon changes her mind.
9	9	"The Big In with the Crowd Episode"	Ellen Gittelsohn	Michaela Feeley	November 18, 2002	108	4.13
Dee Dee invites Mona to a "girls' night" with her friends, but Mona instantly feels out of place amidst the ritzy women. When Dee Dee gives Mona an expensive purse, Mona deduces that her half-sister is trying to make her over. Meanwhile, Spencer is attracted to one of Dee Dee's friends. Special guest: Nicole Scherzinger
10	10	"The Big Thanks for Forgiving Episode"	Ellen Gittelsohn	Beth Seriff & Geoff Tarson	November 25, 2002	109	4.08
Mona and Phyllis attend Thanksgiving dinner at Big Dee Dee's, where the sisters' paternal grandmother is the guest of honor. But Dee Dee becomes jealous when she learns that the older woman showers Mona with affection. Meanwhile, Phyllis and Big Dee Dee make a deal; and Spencer blurts out one of Mona's secrets to her mother. Special guest: Diahann Carroll
11	11	"The Big Upsetting Set-Up Episode"	Ellen Gittelsohn	Jay Dyer	December 16, 2002	110	4.57
When Mona and Dee Dee set Spencer up on blind date with a woman they met from the gym, Spencer falls for her hard and fast. But when Mona finds out that the girl is only using Spencer to get back at her ex, she tries to warn him, but he thinks she's jealous.
12	12	"The Big Hit It & Quit It Episode"	Ellen Gittelsohn	Carla Banks Waddles	January 20, 2003	111	3.07
When Dee Dee becomes frustrated with Neil because he does not seem interested in getting intimate, he divulges that he is celibate. Meanwhile, Mona is under pressure at work and takes up smoking again, but she is too embarrassed to admit it and tries to hide it from her family.
13	13	"The Big Condom-Nation Episode"	Ellen Gittelsohn	Michaela Feeley	February 3, 2003	113	3.30
Spencer thinks that he has gotten a girl pregnant, and Dee Dee and Mona force him to get an HIV test. Special guest: Tatyana Ali
14	14	"The Big Game of Love Episode"	Ellen Gittelsohn	Jamie Wooten	February 10, 2003	114	3.81
Mona fears a lonely Valentine's Day, but her tears may be for naught when two men from her recent past both ask her on dates. Also, Dee Dee is miffed that Neil would choose work over her. Meanwhile, Big Dee Dee is angry with her husband, who also chooses work over her.
15	15	"The Big Phat Mouth Episode: Part 1"	Ellen Gittelsohn	Beth Seriff & Geoff Tarson	February 17, 2003	115	2.52
When Mona mistakes a dinner date with a handsome reporter for a personal affair, she unwittingly gets quoted in a music magazine saying disparaging things about one of her music label's artists that ends up getting her fired. Meanwhile, Dee Dee utilizes her law-school knowledge to try to get the story retracted. Special guest: Loretta Devine
16	16	"The Big Phat Mouth Episode: Part 2"	Ellen Gittelsohn	David M. Matthews	February 18, 2003	116	1.71
While Mona struggles to find work after poisoning her reputation in the record industry, the reporter whose article got her fired tries to make amends and sets up a meeting for Mona to plead her case to Big Phat Slim Jim, the artist she disparaged, in hopes of getting her old job back. Meanwhile, Mona's family and friends offer their encouragement and support in their own special ways during her difficult job search. Special guests: Loretta Devine, Estelle Harris
17	17	"The Big Mixed Up Mojo Episode"	Ellen Gittelsohn	David M. Gittelsohn	March 17, 2003	112	3.57
In a strange reversal of fortunes, Dee Dee's charmed life seems to hit an unlucky streak at every turn while, ironically, the usually pessimistic Mona's life becomes auspicious from one moment to the next. When Dee Dee starts doubting herself after failing her assigned mock-court competition at school, with Mona's help she manages to regain her waning confidence by confronting a crooked businessman.
18	18	"The Big Sexy Shame Episode"	Ellen Gittelsohn	Stacy A. Littlejohn	March 24, 2003	118	3.26
Mona dates a hunk whose looks almost compensate for his lack of brains. As a result, she tries to hide him from her friends and family, but the effort is for naught when they're invited to her father's dinner party for a U.S. senator. Special guests: Tyrese Gibson, Luke James
19	19	"The Big Falling for It Episode"	Ellen Gittelsohn	Temple Northup	April 21, 2003	117	3.21
The Big Falling for It Episode : Mona drags Dee Dee to a self-defense class, where she accidentally hurts her little sister while practicing a back flip. Overwhelmed with guilt, she waits on Dee Dee hand and foot, unaware that Dee Dee's milking the injury.
20	20	"The Big I Have a Dream Episode"	Ellen Gittelsohn	Michaela Feeley	April 21, 2003	119	3.69
Mona becomes antsy about her friendship with Spencer after she has a romantic dream about him. Meanwhile, Dee Dee -- who thinks the dream was about a woman -- introduces Mona to a lesbian friend of hers.
21	21	"The Big Much I Do About Nothing Episode"	Ellen Gittelsohn	Winifred Hervey	April 28, 2003	122	4.06
When Mona has Spencer masquerade as her beau at a friend's wedding, Spencer realizes that he has romantic feelings for her, and has had them since college. Meanwhile, Dee Dee dumps her boyfriend when she learns he has matrimony on the mind.
22	22	"The Big Mother's of a Mother's Day Episode"	Ellen Gittelsohn	Jay Dyer	May 5, 2003	120	3.67
For Mother's Day weekend, Big Dee Dee and Dee Dee vacation at an exclusive spa. Not to be outdone, Phyllis and Mona do the same, and end up in the room next door. The weekend quickly goes from weird to worse when Dee Dee blurts out that she wishes her mom was more like Phyllis.
23	23	"The Big Bad Neighbor Episode"	Ellen Gittelsohn	Carla Banks Waddles	May 12, 2003	121	4.04
The gals' already tenuous friendship spirals toward dissolution when Dee Dee celebrates the end of her school year by hosting a raucous celebration that keeps Mona awake all night. Things get worse when Dee Dee installs a hot tub, which floods Mona's apartment. Stepping in to mediate, their father, Charles, reminds them that "like it or not, we're family." But the squabbling continues, until a medical emergency involving their dad arises. Special guest: Sugar Ray Leonard

=== Season 2 (2003–04) ===
No. overall	No. in season	Title	Directed by	Written by	Original release date	Prod. code	U.S. viewers (millions)
24	1	"The Big Mis-Conception Episode: Part 1"	Ellen Gittelsohn	Yvette Lee Bowser & Jamie Wooten	September 15, 2003	201	4.02
Dee Dee and Big Dee Dee plan a "surprise" party for Charles and Big Dee Dee's 24th wedding anniversary. While putting together a slide show, Dee Dee discovers that there are very few photographs of Mona with their father. She feels sorry for her sister and makes several attempts to cheer her up (first creating fake photos of the two, then trying to set up a lunch date for Mona and Charles), but only angers her further. Mona explains that she had accepted the fact that she and her father didn't have the closest relationship, but Dee Dee is inadvertently opening the wounds. Phyllis produces evidence that proves Charles wasn't quite as distant as it seems. Spencer develops an attraction to Camille, a photographer working with Delicious Records artists. Adam constantly tries to alert Mona about Spencer's feelings for her. He finally tells her the truth, but they discover that Spencer is involved with Camille. Meanwhile, Dee Dee becomes annoyed when her "summer fling" starts to get a little too attached to her. She soon discovers that the fling may have serious consequences.
25	2	"The Big Mis-Conception Episode: Part 2"	Ellen Gittelsohn	Jamie Wooten & Yvette Lee Bowser	September 22, 2003	202	4.79
Dee Dee takes a pregnancy test, although Mona feels that she might be overreacting (her period is only a day late). Before Dee Dee can check the results, her mother bursts and demands to use the bathroom. Big Dee Dee also takes a pregnancy test, which turns out to be positive. She is startled, but she and Charles quickly accept the news. Big Dee Dee gets to rub her pregnancy in the face of Phyllis, who had believed Big Dee Dee was going through menopause. Mona is upset to realize that Spencer has been seeing Camille for some time, but hadn't confided in her. He claims that he wanted to keep quiet until he knew the relationship could last. Phyllis chastises Mona for letting "her" man get away, while Adam refuses to believe that Spencer is over Mona. He insists that he is happy with Camille, adding that Mona would never want him anyway. Mona patches things up with Spencer and says that she is very happy for him.
26	3	"The Big Keep Your Eyes Off My Prize Episode"	Ellen Gittelsohn	Linda Mathious & Heather MacGillvray	September 29, 2003	203	4.48
Aspiring politician Ron Brown shows up at Mona's door in search of votes, and takes a liking to her. Phyllis quickly pushes him to ask her out, and they agree to a date. Mona then learns that Big Dee Dee recently arranged a date for Dee Dee and Ron, who have been friends since childhood. The sisters are unsure about dating the same man, but their mothers insist that it will be all right (as it is unlikely that both will be compatible with Ron). Phyllis and Big Dee Dee treat the whole thing as a personal competition. Mona and Dee Dee like Ron, but decide that he isn't worth the potential damage to their relationship. They agree to do the "mature" thing and stop dating Ron, but each keeps seeing him behind the other's back.
27	4	"The Big Birth-Quake Episode"	Ellen Gittelsohn	Beth Seriff & Geoff Tarson	October 6, 2003	204	4.04
Mona tells her friends and family that she doesn't want to celebrate her birthday, as she would rather spend the day alone in quiet reflection. However, she soon becomes extremely bored. She is relieved when Big Dee Dee shows up, although she has actually forgotten Mona's birthday and is just there to see Dee Dee. The two go down to the laundry room in pursuit of Big Dee Dee's dog, and wind up trapped when an earthquake hits. They share a picnic lunch and have a revealing talk about their relationship. Meanwhile, Phyllis tracks down Charles to try to convince him to help buy a car for Mona's birthday, and they wind up stuck in an elevator. The earthquake also traps Dee Dee, Adam and Spencer in an upscale store as they shop for Mona's gift. Everyone is embarrassed when Spencer has a panic attack after the earthquake.
28	5	"The Big Big No-Substitutions Please Episode"	Ellen Gittelsohn	Carla Banks Waddles	October 13, 2003	205	3.91
After Dee Dee loses her old room to the baby and Big Dee Dee misses several appointments, Dee Dee begins to worry that the baby is forcing her out of her parents' life. She suffers from so much stress that she has a breakdown and hears a doll talking to her. Mona recommends that she make an appointment with Phyllis to discuss her problem. She says that she feels as though she is the only one who is worried about the way the baby will change her life. Phyllis assures her that her reaction is perfectly natural and that she should air her concerns with Big Dee Dee. Before she gets around to it, Big Dee Dee admits to her own anxieties about the child's birth, and thanks Dee Dee for her support. The conversation reassures Dee Dee about her importance in her mother's life. Meanwhile, Spencer continually cancels on Mona because of plans with Camille. She looks to Adam to take his place, but Adam isn't too thrilled about this.
29	6	"The Big Butting In Episode"	Ellen Gittelsohn	Michaela Feeley	October 20, 2003	207	4.22
Hoping to prove herself to her father, Dee Dee goes against his wishes and tries to personally handle a tenant who has failed to pay rent for the last few months. She must come up with a new plan of attack after the man retaliates by threatening to expose several building code violations involving Dee Dee's apartment. Meanwhile, Mona reluctantly takes her mother out on the town. She feels crowded when Phyllis begins showing up regularly at her hangout and playing matchmaker for the patrons.
30	7	"The Big Foot In My Mouth Episode"	Ellen Gittelsohn	David M. Matthews	November 3, 2003	208	3.81
After another failed relationship, Mona decides to focus on her career for a while. She is determined to help Zora, a promising young singer, secure a contract with the record company. Zora mistakes Mona's efforts to boost her confidence for romantic interest and develops feelings for her. She confesses her crush to Adam, who keeps the news to himself so that he can watch the sparks fly. Mona struggles to come up with a way to handle the situation without hurting Zora's feelings. Meanwhile, Dee Dee dates a man who pays way too much attention to her feet.
31	8	"The Big Forbidden Fruit Episode"	Ellen Gittelsohn	Winifred Hervey	November 10, 2003	206	4.10
Phyllis announces that she has been seeing someone for the past month. She reluctantly agrees to bring her boyfriend, Earl, to the apartment to meet the girls. Earl is handsome, sweet and romantic, and leaves everyone (including Big Dee Dee) sufficiently impressed. Dee Dee sees Earl at a restaurant with another woman, and learns that it is his wife. Mona and Dee Dee try to break the news to Phyllis, and are stunned to discover that she already knew that Earl is married. She believes that he is separated and about to get a divorce. Mona and Dee Dee try to convince her to stop seeing him. Meanwhile, Spencer discovers that being attached has suddenly made him virtually irresistible to other women.
32	9	"The Big College Admission Episode"	Ellen Gittelsohn	Temple Northup	November 17, 2003	209	4.49
Spencer's cousin Chauncey begins working in the mailroom at the record company and blabbing everyone's secrets. He recalls the time in college that he walked in on Spencer and Mona apparently in the midst of a drunken tryst, creating friction between Spencer and Camille. The story prompts Mona to confront her feelings for Spencer, as she wonders if the reason she has been so jealous of his girlfriends is because she wants him for herself. Meanwhile, Dee Dee creates a mold of her mother's pregnant belly -- which Big Dee Dee hates.
33	10	"The Big Bitter Shower Episode"	Ellen Gittelsohn	Carla Banks Waddles	November 24, 2003	210	4.53
Dee Dee's cousin Barbara comes to town for Big Dee Dee's baby shower, and stays with Mona because there is no room at Dee Dee's place. Mona is furious to learn from Barbara that Dee Dee shared things that Mona had told her in confidence about the effect her mother's bitterness has had on her feelings about marriage. Mona gives Dee Dee the silent treatment, but later has a talk with Phyllis about her fears. Big Dee Dee dreads the shower because she knows the guests will insist on touching her belly. Meanwhile, Spencer gets a makeover from Adam and some friends in the hopes of impressing Camille's social crowd.
34	11	"The Big How the Ex Stole Christmas Episode"	Ellen Gittelsohn	Chauncey B. Raglin-Washington	December 15, 2003	211	3.92
Dee Dee invites everyone over to her parents' house for Christmas. The Bay Area experiences a heatwave, which leads to a brownout that nearly ruins dinner. Spencer angrily declines Mona's invitation, as the holiday brings up many issues about his absent father. Mona later offers to help Spencer track down his father. Phyllis brings her new boyfriend, a Santa Claus she met at the children's hospital, but both she and Charles object when the man refuses to keep his hands off of her. Neil calls Dee Dee and asks to come over and speak with her. She believes that he wants her back, and is stunned when he instead announces plans to marry. She tries to use the heat to her advantage in an attempt to win back Neil, while Mona urges her to just move on. Guest star: Richard Lawson
35	12	"The Big Double Date with My Mate Episode"	Ellen Gittelsohn	Linda Mathious & Heather MacGillvray	January 12, 2004	212	3.77
Camille sets up Mona on a date with her best friend, the handsome and engaging Carlo, whom she hasn't seen for many years. Mona is thrilled when she and Carlo hit it off, and believes he might be a long-term boyfriend prospect. However, Carlo is actually in love with Camille and wants to pursue a relationship with her. Meanwhile, Dee Dee and Big Dee Dee are desperate to find out the sex of the baby, while Charles insists that they should wait until the birth. The women try to go behind his back to the doctor.
36	13	"The Big You're Not the Boss of Me Episode"	Ellen Gittelsohn	Beth Seriff & Geoff Tarson	February 9, 2004	213	3.52
Delicious Records is bought out; and a new boss, respected music business veteran Kai Owens, takes over the company. She is bringing many of her own associates along, so she begins conducting interviews to see which employees will get to keep their jobs. Adam, exhilarated by all of the drama, giddily celebrates each new firing by banging a gong. Mona fears that she will be the next to go because she is terrible in interviews. Despite Dee Dee's advice, she blows the interview. However, Kai respects her work so much that she promotes her to a Vice President position. This makes her Spencer's boss, and he has trouble adjusting to the situation, ignoring her orders and talking back to her. Mona worries that they will not be able to maintain their friendship. Meanwhile, Dee Dee pleads with her mother to let her make a connection with her unborn brother in some way. Big Dee Dee offers to let her name the baby.
37	14	"The Big Love Is Here and Now You're Gone Episode"	Ellen Gittelsohn	Jamie Wooten	February 16, 2004	214	3.69
Camille returns from a vacation in London and behaves coldly toward Spencer. She finally admits that she is desperately homesick and has decided to move back to England.
38	15	"The Big I Haven't the Vegas Idea Episode"	Ellen Gittelsohn	Michaela Feeley	February 23, 2004	215	3.26
Mona tries to find time alone with Nick, but her mother and Dee Dee can't seem to get the message. Dee Dee's longtime friend Aurora comes for a visit.
39	16	"The Big Labor of Love Episode"	Ellen Gittelsohn	Bill Fuller & Jim Pond	March 1, 2004	217	3.71
The Thornes' plans for a well-orchestrated C-section go by the wayside when Big Dee Dee goes into labor three weeks early. A panicked Dee Dee turns to Mona for help. Guest star: Kathy Griffin
40	17	"The Big Type Cast Episode"	Ellen Gittelsohn	David M. Matthews	March 29, 2004	216	3.08
Dee Dee organizes a singles mixer at a local club. She bristles at Mona's claim that she only dates a certain type of man (well-groomed and upwardly mobile), and tries to prove her wrong by picking up a tough guy named Keno.
41	18	"The Big Good Help Is Hard to Find Episode"	Ellen Gittelsohn	David L. Moses	March 29, 2004	218	3.75
Kai orders Mona to exercise some of her new power as a vice president by firing Adam. Guest star: Shemar Moore
42	19	"The Big Practice What You Preach Episode"	Ellen Gittelsohn	Carla Banks Waddles	April 12, 2004	219	2.99
With Drew's christening approaching, Mona and Dee Dee vie for the right to be their brother's godmother. They grow increasingly competitive as they buy him gifts and try to impress Charles and Big Dee Dee. Guest star: Clifton Davis
43	20	"The Big Employee Benefits Episode"	Ellen Gittelsohn	Chauncey B. Raglin-Washington	April 26, 2004	220	2.73
Dee Dee vies with her law-school rival Stephanie Seymour for a summer internship. Guest star: Giancarlo Esposito
44	21	"The Big Mother of Mother's Day Rides Again Episode"	Ellen Gittelsohn	Beth Seriff & Geoff Tarson	May 3, 2004	222	2.92
Big Dee Dee, Phyllis, Mona, and Dee Dee make plans to spend Mother's Day together at a brunch/concert. Mona is surprised to learn that Dee Dee plans to get Phyllis a present. She scrambles to find something appropriate for Big Dee Dee. Guest star: Niecy Nash
45	22	"The Big Fetish What You Started Episode"	Ellen Gittelsohn	Winifred Hervey	May 10, 2004	221	3.30
Dee Dee runs into Clay, her ex-boyfriend with the foot fetish. He tells her that he has gotten treatment for his problem, and asks to start seeing her again. Dee Dee is not interested, but Mona and Big Dee Dee convince her that he is a good guy who deserves another chance. Guest stars: Billy Dee Williams, Musiq Soulchild
46	23	"The Big Rules of Engagement Episode"	Ellen Gittelsohn	Linda Mathious & Heather MacGillvray	May 17, 2004	223	2.53
Nick tells Mona that his parents are coming to town for the weekend, and that he would like her to meet them. Mona is very nervous, as she has never met the parents of any of her boyfriends.
47	24	"The Big Lover, My Brother Episode"	Ellen Gittelsohn	David M. Matthews	May 17, 2004	224	2.79
Dee Dee assigns herself the task of personally helping Mona get over her break-up with Nick.

=== Season 3 (2004–05) ===
No. overall	No. in season	Title	Directed by	Written by	Original release date	Prod. code	U.S. viewers (millions)
48	1	"The Big My Little Pony Episode"	Ellen Gittelsohn	Yvette Lee Bowser	September 20, 2004	301	3.34
Mona returns from a Hawaiian vacation and clears the air with Spencer. They reaffirm their decision to just be friends.
49	2	"The Big Birth-Date Episode"	Ellen Gittelsohn	Jamie Wooten	September 27, 2004	302	3.53
Mona and Dee Dee agree to get each other dates as a birthday present. Dee Dee does some thorough research and finds Mona a seemingly perfect guy, James, and the two get along well enough to set up a second date.
50	3	"The Big Advice to Put It on Ice Episode"	Ellen Gittelsohn	Beth Seriff & Geoff Tarson	October 4, 2004	303	3.93
Mona pretends that Drew is her son in the hopes of winning over an artist that she is trying to sign who is a single mother. Guest star: Faith Evans
51	4	"The Big One Wedding and a Funeral Episode"	Ellen Gittelsohn	Carla Banks Waddles	October 11, 2004	304	3.96
Mona and Dee Dee attend Neil's wedding, where their conversation with the already-nervous bride in the bathroom leads her to call off the wedding. Mona believes they should stay out of the situation to avoid causing further harm; but Dee Dee insists on taking in the devastated Neil when he shows up on her doorstep. Spencer regrets giving an overly generous tip to the stripper at Neil's bachelor party, and tries to get the woman to return it. Meanwhile, Big Dee Dee fears that she and Phyllis may actually have things in common after they run into each other at a funeral and discover that they both dated the deceased.
52	5	"The Big Don't Leave Me This Way Episode"	Ellen Gittelsohn	Michaela Feeley	October 18, 2004	305	3.74
Mona must work long hours as she prepares a major presentation for Kai about her talent search idea. She begins to lose touch with her family and friends, as she misses out on Dee Dee's weekly parties and is unaware of major news like Spencer getting a new girlfriend and Phyllis and Ray deciding to live together. Mona makes an effort to better balance her personal and professional lives, with disastrous results. Meanwhile, Adam, upset that being gay is now the main thing, decides that he is going to be straight.
53	6	"The Big Not So Loyal Family Episode"	Ellen Gittelsohn	David M. Matthews	October 25, 2004	306	3.66
Dee Dee is furious to discover that Mona has become friends with Dee Dee's rival, Stephanie Seymour, after meeting her through a work event. Dee Dee insists that Mona should dislike the same people that she does because it is her duty as a sister. Mona tricks the duo into having tea with her in the hopes of getting them to make peace, but things do not exactly go the way she had planned. Meanwhile, a rejected applicant for the talent search refuses to take no for an answer. Guest star: Kel Mitchell
54	7	"The Big Don't Go Chasing Waterfalls Episode"	Maynard C. Virgil	Chauncey B. Raglin-Washington	November 8, 2004	310	3.68
Kai reluctantly agrees to give a shot to Spencer's friend RJ Jackson, a talented and successful singer with a reputation for partying. Spencer has difficulty reining in RJ, and must resort to desperate measures to get a track recorded before the deadline. Meanwhile, Big Dee Dee decides to return to the stage after helping Adam prepare for an acting showcase. Guest star: Ginuwine
55	8	"The Big My Life & Kids Episode"	Ellen Gittelsohn	Heather MacGillvray & Linda Mathious	November 15, 2004	307	3.76
Dee Dee makes a date with her favorite author after meeting him at a book signing. All appears to be going well, but Dee Dee reconsiders the relationship after learning that Carter has full custody of his two young daughters. Meanwhile, Phyllis begins snapping at everyone and seeks refuge at Mona's apartment after disagreeing with Ray's decision to take on another shift at the radio station.
56	9	"The Big Thanks for Nothing Episode"	Ellen Gittelsohn	Temple Northup	November 22, 2004	309	3.23
After Ray says that he cannot make the Thornes' Thanksgiving dinner due to work commitments, Spencer invites his mother (who is unaware of his reunion with Ray) to fly in for the holiday. However, Ray arrives at the gathering unexpectedly. Spencer's mother constantly argues with Ray and lashes out at Spencer for keeping secrets from her. Phyllis and Ray decide to break up because he still has some lingering feelings for his ex. Meanwhile, Dee Dee pushes Mona to be more honest with their father about her frustration over his limited involvement in her life. Guest star: Tyler Florence
57	10	"The Big Parent Trap Episode"	Ellen Gittelsohn	Winifred Hervey	November 29, 2004	308	3.37
After hiding the relationship for a month, Dee Dee reluctantly introduces Carter to her parents. They are surprisingly supportive. However, Big Dee Dee immediately goes to Mona and pleads with her to try to sabotage the relationship, as she and Charles believe that Carter is completely wrong for Dee Dee. Dee Dee is furious, and winds up surprised by Carter's reaction to the situation. Meanwhile, Kai provides Mona and Spencer with an assistant, who livens up the office but doesn't seem to do any actual work.
58	11	"The Big Home Is Where the Car Is Episode"	Ellen Gittelsohn	Bill Fuller & Jim Pond	January 3, 2005	311	3.62
Mona fears that her new man is too good to be true, so she searches for his hidden major flaw. Dee Dee accuses her of being paranoid, but soon discovers that Mona has reason to be wary, as Roland is living out of his car. Big Dee Dee considers having her breasts enlarged, but winds up receiving comfort from Phyllis as she faces a potential health crisis. A bored and desperate Dee Dee puts on a show for an apparent peeping tom in the building across the street from her apartment.
59	12	"The Big All Bets Are Off Episode"	Ellen Gittelsohn	Heather MacGillvray & Linda Mathious	January 31, 2005	312	3.15
After Dee Dee bests her at an online word game, Mona grows frustrated by the fact that she always loses to her sister. She becomes determined to beat her at something, and sees her opportunity when Dee Dee organizes a poker party for one of her law school professors. Their mothers decide to crash the event, where Phyllis winds up winning Big Dee Dee's wedding ring in the pot. Meanwhile, Adam tries to get access to a copy of Spencer's personal music playlist.
60	13	"The Big Credit Check Episode"	Ellen Gittelsohn	Beth Seriff & Geoff Tarson	February 7, 2005	313	3.48
Mona becomes upset when Kai repeatedly refuses to give her credit for the Fast Track contest in interviews. Mona, at her family's urging, tries to seize some of the credit for herself, with disastrous results. Meanwhile, Big Dee Dee gets in touch with her agent so that she can resume her acting career. She winds up playing second fiddle to Coco in a dog food commercial. Guest star: Quddus
61	14	"The Big Performance Anxiety Episode"	Ellen Gittelsohn	David L. Moses	February 14, 2005	314	3.38
After Dee Dee learns that her mother's co-star in a new play is engaged to Dee Dee's idol, esteemed attorney Maxine Shaw, Dee Dee sees an opportunity to atone for a bad interview she once had with the woman. However, Dee Dee believes she has lost her chance after Big Dee Dee (who had to finance the play to ensure she could star in it) gets Max's beau fired because she fears he will take attention away from her. Meanwhile, Mona must find a way to rein in her co-workers after Kai is delayed and leaves her in charge of a company retreat at a resort. Erika Alexander and T.C. Carson reprise their roles as Maxine Shaw and Kyle Barker from the 1990s sitcom Living Single.
62	15	"The Big Fast Track Episode: Part 1"	Ellen Gittelsohn	Yvette Lee Bowser & Jamie Wooten	February 21, 2005	315	3.53
Mona panics when a screw-up by Spencer may cost Delicious a chance to have mega-successful producers Jimmy Jam and Terry Lewis help judge a showcase with the talent search finalists. Meanwhile, Dee Dee tries to prove to Mona that she can get by without their father's assistance after she gets downsized from her new job before her first day. Guest stars: Jimmy Jam and Terry Lewis
63	16	"The Big Fast Track Episode: Part 2"	Ellen Gittelsohn	Yvette Lee Bowser & Jamie Wooten	February 28, 2005	316	3.83
Mona grows very nervous about her role in selecting the Fast Track winner, especially after Kai decides to step aside and leave the decision about whom Delicious will sign to Mona. Dee Dee urges Mona to have confidence in her abilities. After a workshop, studio session and live showcase, Mona, Jimmy Jam and Terry Lewis select the winning act. Guest stars: Jimmy Jam and Terry Lewis
64	17	"The Big Undercover Lover Episode"	Victor Gonzalez	Carla Banks Waddles	March 28, 2005	317	3.37
Mona tries to comfort Dee Dee after Carter appears on a talk show and says that he is seeing someone. When she later discovers that Dee Dee and Carter have secretly reunited, an angry Mona declares that she will not help Dee Dee pick up the pieces after the new "casual" relationship fails. Meanwhile, Spencer tries to get into photography in the hopes of getting rich; and Dee Dee and Big Dee Dee face a crisis involving their hair stylist.
65	18	"The Big Doormat No More Episode"	Maynard C. Virgil I	Michaela Feeley	April 25, 2005	318	2.95
After Mona complains about being bombarded with demos and Spencer's refusal to pay back his debts, Dee Dee encourages her to become more assertive and not let people take advantage of her. Mona follows her advice and re-possesses Spencer's new jacket and shoes. However, Dee Dee's words come back to haunt her when her sister refuses to listen to a demo by Dee Dee's handsome and influential new boyfriend. Meanwhile, Phyllis enjoys being pampered at an expensive shoe store after a salesgirl mistakes her for Big Dee Dee. Guest star: Virginia Williams
66	19	"The Big Who's Wooing Who Episode"	Ellen Gittelsohn	Winifred Hervey	May 2, 2005	319	3.12
Mona entertains overtures from the head of a rival record company, who hopes to hire her away from Delicious. She seeks her father's advice on how to handle the situation, leading to resentment from Phyllis. Meanwhile, Big Dee Dee plans a lavish 15-month "birthday" party for Drew in the hopes of showing up her friends. Guest star: Eric Benét
67	20	"The Big Mothers for Others Episode"	Ellen Gittelsohn	David M. Matthews	May 9, 2005	320	3.59
Phyllis recruits Mona, Spencer and Adam to help out with a telethon on Mother's Day. Big Dee Dee and Dee Dee also decide to participate. Phyllis grows so frustrated with Big Dee Dee's interference at a pre-telethon meeting that she blurts out that Big Dee Dee was pregnant before she got married. Dee Dee is shocked and hurt by the fact that this was kept a secret from her, while Mona gives Phyllis the silent treatment because she is fed up with her bluntness and inability to keep her mouth shut. Guest star: Alan Thicke
68	21	"The Big Thorne in My Side Episode"	Ellen Gittelsohn	Chauncey B. Raglin-Washington	May 16, 2005	321	3.85
In the hopes of getting closer to Phyllis, Dee Dee sets her up with her bitter divorced professor. However, the relationship soon fizzles, and the professor seeks revenge against Phyllis by turning her in for having too many cats. Phyllis blames Dee Dee, whose efforts to correct the situation only wind up making it worse. Guest star: Roxanne Beckford
69	22	"The Big Pomp & Circumstance Episode"	Ellen Gittelsohn	Temple Northup & David L. Moses	May 23, 2005	322	3.98
Dee Dee has difficulty preparing her law school valedictory speech because she is uneasy about the fact that she doesn't have a post-graduation job lined up. Big Dee Dee worsens the situation when she suggests that she give up on her career and just look for a man, then tricks her into going on a blind date. Meanwhile, Mona tries desperately to prevent her mother from moving into her neighborhood. Guest star: Blair Underwood

=== Season 4 (2005–06) ===
No. overall	No. in season	Title	Directed by	Written by	Original release date	Prod. code	U.S. viewers (millions)
70	1	"The Big Gen: Why Me? Episode"	Ellen Gittelsohn	Carla Banks Waddles	September 19, 2005	401	3.86
Dee Dee has difficulty finding a job after graduation. After she announces plans to return to school, her fed-up father not only cuts her off, but orders her to pay back all expenses accrued since her 21st birthday. Mona begins dating her handsome and charming new neighbor, Lorenzo, but her insecurities stand in the way of the relationship. Spencer changes his wardrobe in the hopes of getting people to take him more seriously.
71	2	"The Big Dollars & Sense Episode"	Ellen Gittelsohn	Michaela Feeley	September 26, 2005	402	3.24
Mona refuses to go along with Spencer's desire to sign a talentless but popular heiress to Delicious. He infuriates her by finding a way to pitch his proposal without her approval. Meanwhile, Big Dee Dee is jealous when Phyllis teaches Dee Dee a series of money-saving tips to help her adjust to her new financial standing.
72	3	"The Big Frozen Assets Episode"	Ellen Gittelsohn	Yvette Lee Bowser & Jamie Wooten	October 3, 2005	403	3.33
Mona decides to embrace her birthday for a change and throw a party honoring Dee Dee and her. However, the event is spoiled by Phylllis's gift to Mona: a certificate to have her eggs frozen at a fertility clinic. Meanwhile, Dee Dee receives a great job offer with a law firm, but decides to pass because her instincts tell her something else will come along. Her friendship with an NBA star soon leads to a new opportunity for a career.
73	4	"The Big Training Day Episode"	Ellen Gittelsohn	Yvette Lee Bowser & Jamie Wooten	October 10, 2005	404	3.53
Dee Dee begins work as a sports agent, but clashes with a cocky co-worker. They are both upset when their boss forces them to work together to bring in a hot football player. Meanwhile, Adam recommends that Mona and Spencer follow his lead by signing up for an online dating service. They decide to write each other's profiles after having difficulty completing them on their own.
74	5	"The Big Young & the Restless Episode"	Ellen Gittelsohn	Winifred Hervey	October 17, 2005	405	3.82
After Dee Dee starts a grease fire in her apartment, a handsome fireman rescues one of Phyllis's cats from the building. Phyllis eagerly tries to set him up with Mona, but the man winds up being attracted to Phyllis. Meanwhile, Adam falls into a funk over his friends' successes, especially after learning that Spencer has purchased his own home. Spencer tries to cheer Adam and convince him to set some goals for himself.
75	6	"The Big Off Pitch Episode"	Ellen Gittelsohn	Chauncey B. Raglin-Washington	October 24, 2005	407	2.96
Dee Dee and Brett run into problems with their client, a talented pitcher who won't sign his new contract because he wants to devote more time to his musical aspirations. Dee Dee asks Mona to listen to the man sing and dash his dreams of music stardom; but Delicious winds up wanting to sign him, leading to a rift between the sisters. Meanwhile, Big Dee Dee must break some bad news to Phyllis after Coco chases one of Phyllis's cats into traffic. Guest star: Ace Young
76	7	"The Big State of the Reunion Episode"	Ellen Gittelsohn	Geoff Tarson & Beth Seriff	November 7, 2005	406	3.72
Mona goes against her initial instincts and decides to attend her ten-year high school reunion, where her professional accomplishments cannot protect her from the cruel comments of a pair of former cheerleaders. She perks up after a successful classmate takes an interest in her. Meanwhile, things do not go as planned for Spencer when he meets his on-line sweetheart in person; and Adam tries to get rich by stealing company supplies and selling them on the Internet. Guest star: Jaleel White
77	8	"The Big How to Do & Undo It Episode"	Ellen Gittelsohn	Tamiko K. Brooks	November 14, 2005	408	3.41
Spencer seeks Dee Dee's advice to land a sophisticated woman, and again turns to Dee Dee for help ridding himself of the woman when she proves to be unbearably controlling. Gabrielle repeatedly refuses Spencer's efforts to break up with her. Meanwhile, Mona reluctantly gives Phyllis some advice before her first big romantic weekend with Glen. Dee Dee plans a bachelor party for a client. Guest star: Taraji P. Henson
78	9	"The Big Days of Wine & Neuroses Episode"	Ellen Gittelsohn	Linda Mathious & Heather MacGillvray	November 21, 2005	409	3.46
Dee Dee tricks Mona into joining her at a singles weekend at an exclusive new hotel. Mona meets a handsome bartender, but Dee Dee repeatedly tries to steer her away from him, claiming that she has her best interests in mind. Spencer and Adam also attend the event, thanks to Adam's successful friend. Spencer enjoys the perks of hanging out with Adam and his friends, but is surprised to discover that people believe he is also gay. Meanwhile, Big Dee Dee convinces Phyllis that her presence in the building and relationship with Glen are driving Mona away.
79	10	"The Big Sexism in the City Episode"	Ellen Gittelsohn	David L. Moses	November 28, 2005	410	3.39
After Dee Dee complains about Brett's sexist treatment of her, Charles and Spencer show up at the office to confront him. Their actions backfire, as everyone at the office begins thinking of Dee Dee as a "daddy's girl." Dee Dee, with encouragement from Mona, Phyllis and Big Dee Dee, sets out to prove herself by trying to land a successful athlete who has refused to sign with any agent. Guest star: Whitney Cummings
80	11	"The Big Sweet Smell of Excess Episode"	Ellen Gittelsohn	Carla Banks Waddles	December 12, 2005	411	3.59
Mona realizes that she needs to slow down her relationship with Chase after they start spending so much time having sex that it begins to affect her job and other aspects of her life. Dee Dee plans a "legends ball" on behalf of her mother (who is depressed because of her floundering acting career), but finds that none of the invited guests want to attend. Spencer buys a gigantic new truck that soon leaves him financially strapped because he can't afford gas.
81	12	"The Big Turning Over a New Leaf Episode"	Ellen Gittelsohn	Beth Seriff & Geoff Tarson	January 16, 2006	412	2.97
After throwing together a baby shower for Neil and Janet, Dee Dee becomes concerned by the fact that she is the only person in attendance who is not attached. She begins to question her life and decision to pursue her career so aggressively. Meanwhile, Mona worries that her lack of maternal instinct could have a negative effect on her relationship with Chase. She tries spending time with Drew, and receives some advice from Big Dee Dee.
82	13	"The Big Diva Down Episode"	Ellen Gittelsohn	Temple Northup	February 6, 2006	413	3.57
Dee Dee receives the opportunity to appear on a sports talk show, only to humiliate herself by falling flat on her face. Mona objects when Spencer and Adam constantly give in to Dalis's petty demands. She finally puts her foot down, with disastrous results. Special guest: Rodney Peete
83	14	"The Big My Funny Valentine Episode"	Ellen Gittelsohn	Jamie Wooten & Yvette Lee Bowser	February 13, 2006	414	3.09
Mona fears that Chase hasn't made any special plans for Valentine's Day, so she tries to take action. Dee Dee sets Brett up on a blind date in the hopes of curing him of his bad mood concerning the holiday, which stems from a broken engagement. Spencer gets close with a rival music executive whom Mona despises. Adam grows irritated with his Valentine's date, a man with whom he's shared a yearly tryst for the past 10 years. Guest star: Michelle Williams
84	15	"The Big Take Me as I Am Episode"	Ellen Gittelsohn	Michaela Feeley	February 20, 2006	415	3.24
Mona continues to bristle at Spencer's relationship with Naomi, who seems strangely reluctant to become romantically involved with him. Mona's mother and friends encourage her to put her personal feelings about Naomi aside and help Spencer. Naomi later divulges a surprising secret to Spencer. Dee Dee has difficulty following her boss' edict to drop a female tennis player with limited marketability. Big Dee Dee gets a potential break in her acting career when she's given a callback for a low-budget horror movie. Guest star: Kimrie Lewis
85	16	"The Big Reality Bites Episode"	Ellen Gittelsohn	Linda Mathious & Heather MacGillvray	February 27, 2006	416	3.30
Spencer continues to shower Naomi with affection after she reveals her HIV-positive status. However, her newfound confidence prompts her to dump him and seek to profess her love for another man. Mona tries to comfort Spencer, but he rejects her for failing to back him throughout the relationship. Dee Dee agrees to join her new actor boyfriend in a reality show, and winds up humiliated. Charles is surprisingly supportive when Big Dee Dee is asked to do a nude scene in her film debut.
86	17	"The Big Stuck in the Middle Episode"	Maynard C. Virgil	David M. Matthews	March 27, 2006	417	3.31
Dee Dee persuades Mona to ask Chase to give Lorenzo a job.
87	18	"The Big 'What Have We Done?' Episode"	Ellen Gittelsohn	Chauncey B. Raglin-Washington	April 17, 2006	418	3.28
Dee Dee accidentally sleeps with her boss -- twice.
88	19	"The Big Nervous Breakup Episode"	Ellen Gittelsohn	Teleplay by: David L. Moses, Story by: Alec Mapa	April 24, 2006	419	2.82
Mona breaks up with Chase.
89	20	"The Big Mother's What?! Episode"	Ellen Gittelsohn	Tamiko K. Brooks	May 1, 2006	420	2.76
Mona lashes out at her co-workers after her breakup with Chase. Brett wants Dee Dee to help athlete Dwight Mitchell keep a secret from his wife.
90	21	"The Big Hide and Sneak Episode"	Ellen Gittelsohn	Lisa Michelle Payton	May 15, 2006	421	2.70
Mona goes into therapy.
91	22	"The Big Who You Gonna Call Episode"	Ellen Gittelsohn	Temple Northup	May 15, 2006	422	2.70
Mona decides to date both Chase and Lorenzo, until they want her to make a decision. Meanwhile, Dee Dee grows frustrated with her fitness-obsessed boyfriend. The series ends with Mona calling one of the men to tell him he's the one

== Reception ==
On the review aggregator website Rotten Tomatoes, 38% of 8 critics' reviews are positive for the first season.

== Accolades ==
Year	Award	Category	Recipient(s)	Result
2004	35th NAACP Image Awards	Outstanding Comedy Series	Half & Half	Nominated
2004	35th NAACP Image Awards	Outstanding Supporting Actress in a Comedy Series	Telma Hopkins	Nominated
2004	35th NAACP Image Awards	Outstanding Supporting Actress in a Comedy Series	Valarie Pettiford	Nominated
2004	35th NAACP Image Awards	Outstanding Supporting Actor in a Comedy Series	Chico Benymon	Nominated
2005	36th NAACP Image Awards	Outstanding Comedy Series	Half & Half	Nominated
2005	36th NAACP Image Awards	Outstanding Supporting Actress in a Comedy Series	Essence Atkins	Nominated
2005	36th NAACP Image Awards	Outstanding Supporting Actress in a Comedy Series	Telma Hopkins	Nominated
2005	36th NAACP Image Awards	Outstanding Supporting Actress in a Comedy Series	Valarie Pettiford	Nominated
2005	36th NAACP Image Awards	Outstanding Supporting Actor in a Comedy Series	Chico Benymon	Nominated
2006	37th NAACP Image Awards	Outstanding Comedy Series	Half & Half	Nominated
2006	37th NAACP Image Awards	Outstanding Actress in a Comedy Series	Rachel True	Nominated
2006	37th NAACP Image Awards	Outstanding Supporting Actress in a Comedy Series	Telma Hopkins	Nominated
2006	37th NAACP Image Awards	Outstanding Supporting Actress in a Comedy Series	Valarie Pettiford	Nominated
2006	37th NAACP Image Awards	Outstanding Supporting Actor in a Comedy Series	Chico Benymon	Nominated
2007	38th NAACP Image Awards	Outstanding Supporting Actress in a Comedy Series	Telma Hopkins	Nominated
