= Karen Quinones Miller =

American novelist

Karen E. Quinones Miller
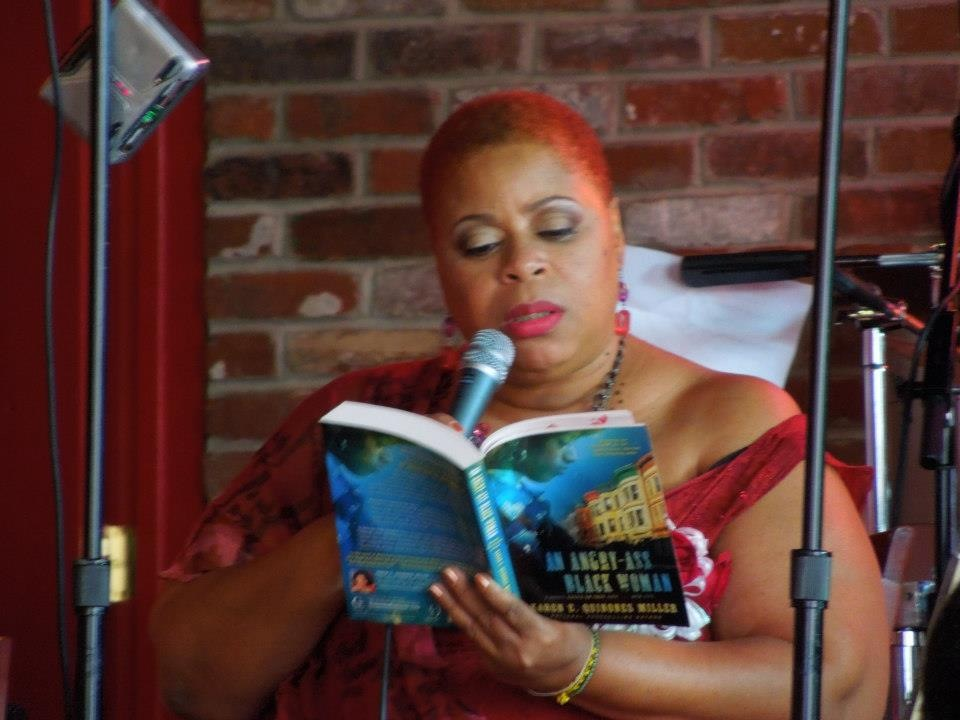
- Quinones Miller at 2012 launch party for her autobiographical novel An Angry-Ass Black Woman
- Born: June 20, 1958 (age 68); New York City, U.S.
- Education: Temple University
- Occupations: Journalist; historian; author; community activist
- Spouse: Kenneth W. Miller (m. 1985; div. 1987)
- Children: 1
- Parent(s): Jose Quinones; Marjorie Bayne Quinones

Karen E. Quinones Miller (née Quinones; born June 20, 1958, New York City) is an American journalist, historian, and nationally best-selling author, and community activist. In particular she has studied Harlem, New York.

== Biography ==
Miller was born in New York City to Marjorie (Bayne) Quinones and Jose Quinones. She has a twin sister, Kathleen, and a younger brother, Joseph. Her older brother, David Quinones, died in 2008. She is African-American. She dropped out of junior high school at the age of 13, and says she spent most of her youth running the streets of Harlem. Although she was not officially home-schooled, her parents both insisted that she continue her education on her own, and gave her an extensive reading list. It was then that her interest in Harlem history was born, as she read novels and poetry by Langston Hughes, Ralph Ellison, Nella Larsen, and Claude McKay. Tired of the fast life, she joined the U. S. Navy in 1980. After her enlistment was over in 1985, she married Kenneth W. Miller, whom she had met while still in service. Their daughter, Camille R. Quinones Miller, was born in April 1987, and they divorced in May of that same year.

In 1988, she moved to Philadelphia and worked as a secretary for the Philadelphia Daily News. While there, she wrote letters to the City Editor complaining about what she considered the biased coverage of people of color. Finally fed up, Miller gave her two-week notice, and enrolled at Temple University to major in journalism. She graduated with a 3.88 GPA, causing her to often joke, "Just goes to prove, the only thing I missed by not going to high school was the prom." Miller worked for a year for the Virginian-Pilot in Norfolk, Virginia, then moved back to Philadelphia in 1994 to become a staff writer for The Philadelphia Inquirer.

== Publishing career ==
In 1999, Miller wrote her first novel Satin Doll, at the instigation of her then 11-year-old daughter. After receiving numerous rejection letters from agents and publishers, she self-published the novel. She sold 3,000 copies in six weeks – and ultimately 28,000 copies in eight months – before signing with an agent in June 2000. So many publishing houses were interested at that point, that a literary auction was held; Simon & Schuster won the publishing rights to Satin Doll, and a second book, with a six-figure bid.

Miller subsequently published eight books (all of which were based in Harlem) through major publishing houses, but she also maintained her own publishing company – Oshun Publishing Company, Inc. – which she used to publish Satin Doll. Oshun Publishing went on to publish the novel Yo Yo Love, which became an Essence best seller and launched the literary career of Essence best-selling author Daaimah S. Poole. Essence best selling author Miasha calls Miller her literary mentor and says Miller was instrumental in her landing her first publishing deal with Simon & Schuster. Miller is included in the book Literary Divas: The Top 100+ Most Admired African-American Women in Literature.

In 2013, Miller was one of fifty writers picked by the city of Philadelphia to be recognized in the Philadelphia Literary Legacy project. Other writers represented in the Literary Legacy include: Louisa May Alcott, Noam Chomsky, W.E.B. Du Bois, Charles Fuller, David Goodis, Ken Kalfus, Beth Kephart, Michael Swanick, Judith Schachner, and Lisa Scottoline.

== Historian ==
An acknowledged Harlem historian, Miller and has been featured in programs on The History Channel, BET, and TV-1 discussing various historical Harlem personalities. In 2005, Miller underwent brain surgery to remove a tumor from her left frontal lobe. In 2008 she was diagnosed with multiple sclerosis. Although she has continued her writing career, Miller now seldom does book tours.

== Bibliography ==
- Satin Doll (1999, Oshun Publishing Company)
- Satin Doll (2001, Simon & Schuster)
- I’m Telling (2002, Simon & Schuster)
- Using What You Got (2003, Simon & Schuster)
- Brown Sugar 2: Great One Night Stands – A Collection of Erotic Black Fiction (2003, Washington Square Press) contributing writer
- Ida B. (2004, Simon & Schuster)
- Satin Nights (2006, Grand Central Publishing)
- Passin’ (2008, Grand Central Publishing)
- Harlem Godfather: The Rap on My Husband, Ellsworth "Bumpy" Johnson (2008, Oshun Publishing Company) co-authored with Mayme H. Johnson
- An Angry-Ass Black Woman (2012, Karen Hunter Publishing)
- Hittin’ It Out The Park (2015, Strebor Books) co-authored with Allison S. Hobbs

== Awards ==
Nominated for NAACP Image Award for Outstanding Literary – Fiction for Ida B.
