= The Magic Hour (album) =

Studio album by Wynton Marsalis
- Released: March 9, 2004
- Recorded: June 6 – 7, 2003
- Studio: Right Track, New York, NY
- Genre: Jazz
- Length: 61:24
- Label: Blue Note
- Producer: Delfeayo Marsalis

Wynton Marsalis chronology
Lincoln Center Jazz Orchestra with Wynton Marsalis Plays the Music of Duke Ellington (2004)	The Magic Hour (2004)	Cast of Cats (2004)

Professional ratings
Review scores
Source	Rating
The Penguin Guide to Jazz Recordings	3/4 stars

The Magic Hour is a 2004 album by Wynton Marsalis, released by Blue Note Records. The album peaked at number two on Billboard's Top Jazz Albums chart. It was recorded on June 6–7, 2003.

== Track listing ==
All tracks are written by Wynton Marsalis, except where noted.

No.	Title	Writer(s)	Length
1.	"Feeling of Jazz"		7:03
2.	"You and Me"		4:50
3.	"Free to Be"		8:39
4.	"Baby, I Love You"	Wynton Marsalis, Bobby McFerrin	3:07
5.	"Big Fat Hen"		7:32
6.	"Skipping"		8:01
7.	"Sophie Rose-Rosalee"		6:47
8.	"The Magic Hour"		13:14

== Personnel ==
- Wynton Marsalis – trumpet
- Eric Lewis – piano
- Carlos Henriquez – acoustic bass
- Ali Jackson – drums, tambourine
- Dianne Reeves – vocalist
- Bobby McFerrin – vocalist
