= Reggie Hayes =

American actor

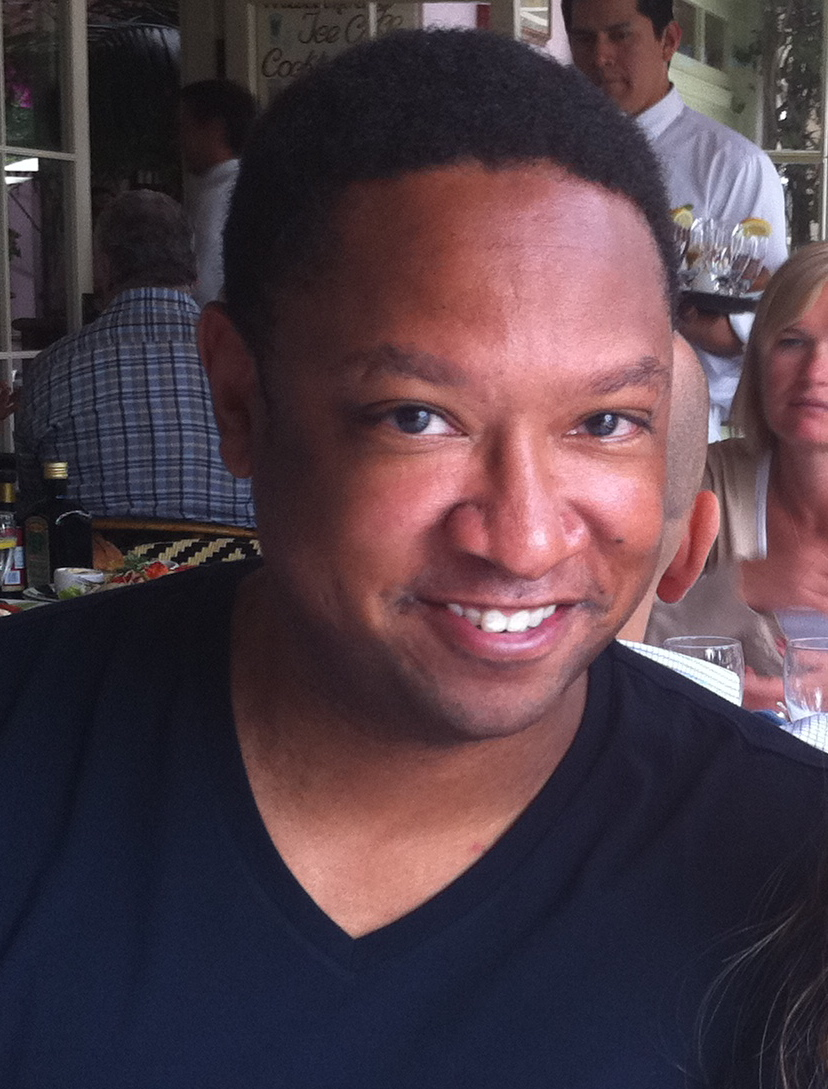
- Born: July 15, 1969 (age 56); Chicago, Illinois, U.S.
- Occupations: Actor; screenwriter; director
- Years active: 1996–present

Reginald C. Hayes (born July 15, 1969) is an American actor, screenwriter, and director. He is best known for his role as William Dent on the UPN/CW show Girlfriends.

== Early life ==
Hayes was born on July 15, 1969, in Chicago, Illinois—youngest of four children. He attended St. John's Northwestern Military Academy, who recognized him as one of three "Notable Men of the Academy". After the academy, he attended Illinois State University, where he obtained a bachelor's degree in Theater. In 2004, he won the "Outstanding Young Alumni Award" and was a member of the Illinois Shakespeare Festival.

== Career ==
Hayes has worked alongside his sister at various events for the charity "Reginald and Frances Hayes H.O.P.E. Scholarship Award".

Hayes portrayed William Dent on UPN/CW's TV show Girlfriends that aired for eight years, ending in 2008. It earned him the "Best Supporting Actor in a Comedy Series" for three NAACP Image Awards. He went on to appear in several other movies and TV shows, including Criminal Minds, Will & Grace, NCIS, Femme Fatales and Abbott Elementary.

Hayes has spoken about the resurgence of interest in Girlfriends after its addition to Netflix.

== Awards ==
Year	Award	Category	Recipient
2004	Outstanding Young Alumni Award	Illinois State University, Class of 1991	Reginald C. Hayes
2005	NAACP Image Awards	Outstanding Supporting Actor in a Comedy Series	Reginald C. Hayes
2006	NAACP Image Awards	Outstanding Supporting Actor in a Comedy Series	Reginald C. Hayes
2007	NAACP Image Awards	Outstanding Supporting Actor in a Comedy Series	Reginald C. Hayes
2011	Notable Men of the Academy Award	St. John's Northwestern Military Academy	Reginald C. Hayes

Actor Reginald C. Hayes was among the first to be recognized as one of three "Notable Men of the Academy" from St. John's Northwestern Military Academy on May 28, 2011.

== Filmography ==
Film
Year	Film	Role	Notes
1996	Nick Freno: Licensed Teacher	Mr. Mezz Crosby	Episode: "Cheap-O's"
1996	Space Above and Beyond	Wallace	Episode: "...Tell Our Moms We've Done Our Best"
1996	A Family Thing	Virgil's Friend	Film
1997	Chicago Cab	Architect	Film
1997	The Pretender	Froman	Episode: "Bomb Squad"
1997	Something So Right	Salesman	Episode: "Something About Dante Proposing to Heather"
1998	Getting Personal	Leon	Main role
1999	Roswell	Agent Hart	Episode: "The Morning After"
1999	Grown Ups	Dominic Fowler	Episode: "The Out of Work-Out"
1999	Being John Malkovich	Don	Film
1999	Party of Five	Music Store Owner	Episode: "Music Store Owner"
2000	Charlie's Angels	Red Star Systems Techie	Film
2000	Then Came You	Leon	Episode: "Then Came Two Birthdays"
2000	Will & Grace	Dr. Osher	Episode: "The Hospital Show"
2000–2008	Girlfriends	William Jerome Dent	TV series
2003	The Twilight Zone	Dr. Bernardi	Episode: "Eye of the Beholder"
2003	The Proud Family	Minister (voice)	Episode: "Wedding Bell Blues"
2003	Kim Possible	Dr. Freeman / Microwave Oven (voice)	Episode: "Car Trouble"
2009	Hummingbird Magic	Reginald C. Hayes	Documentary
2011	Femme Fatales	Kevin Freeman	Episode: "Speed Date"
2012	Criminal Minds	Detective William Richards	Episode: "The Wheels on the Bus"
2013	The Devon Taylor Show	Mitchell Taylor	TV film
2013	The First Family	Reginald the Magician	Episode: "The First Butler"
2013	Let's Stay Together	Jessie, the mob boss	2 episodes
2013–2014	Hart of Dixie	Don Todd	Recurring role
2015	Carter High	Mr. Russeau	Film
2015	NCIS	Café Owner	Episode: "Check"
2019	Black-ish	Walter	Episode: "Feminisn't"
2020	Kidding	Dr. Andrew Jayhan	Episode: "I Wonder What Grass Tastes Like"
2021	Black Lightning	Mayor Billy Black	3 episodes
2022–present	Abbott Elementary	Superintendent Collins	Recurring role

== Stage ==
- Chicago productions of "Chicago Conspiracy Trial"
- "A Raisin in the Sun" The John F. Kennedy Center for the Performing Arts
- "Hellcab Does Christmas"
- "Bang the Drum Slowly"
- "Othello"
- "Five Times Noh"
- "Any Place but Here"
- "Less Than Equal"
- "Native Speech"
- "No One Goes Mad"
- "Inspecting Carol"
- "Richard II"
- Numerous other Shakespeare productions.
