= Chico Benymon =

American actor

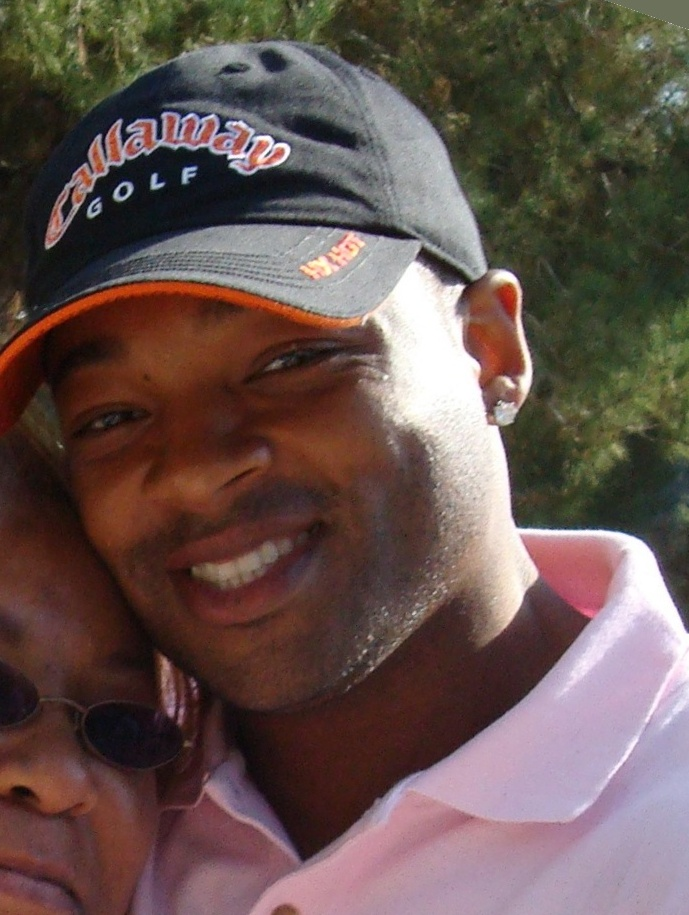
- Benymon in 2007
- Born: Theron Benymon; August 7, 1974 (age 52); Amityville, New York, U.S.
- Occupations: Actor; singer; musician; fashion designer
- Years active: 1999–present

Chico Benymon (born August 7, 1974) is an American actor, singer, musician, and fashion designer best known for his role as Andre "Spencer" Williams on the UPN comedy series Half & Half. He also starred as Ray Preston in the Nickelodeon TV series The Haunted Hathaways.

== Career ==
Chico began his career in 1999 as part of a R&B/Hip hop vocal trio named Trā-Knox, who were Will Smith's protégé and appeared on his studio albums Willennium and Born to Reign as well as the Wild Wild West and Men In Black II soundtracks. Their most notable featured single Black Suits Comin' (Nod Ya Head) peaked at number 77 on the Billboard Hot 100 chart in June 2002. Trā-Knox was signed to Will Smith’s label Overbrook Entertainment/Westbrook in 2000 with Chico Benymon, Ramon Adams and Tony Brisby who completed the vocal group. The band was short lived as the members decided to separate and venture off into other endeavors before the EP album production was to be completed.

Before the group's disbandment, he sought opportunity into television and film, making a brief appearance on Moesha before his most notable role on the sitcom Half & Half. Benymon then furthered his career into television films and starred alongside Fantasia playing her boyfriend in the 2006 television biopic film Life Is Not a Fairytale: The Fantasia Barrino Story based on the memoir of the same name. He began to return to music in the early 2010s as he began writing and producing his own music releasing music as singles on over the internet with hopes of releasing a studio album. In 2013, he became part of the cast of the Nickelodeon's family series The Haunted Hathaways for two seasons playing a father of two children who are all haunted ghosts residing where new tenants moved in. Years later, he teamed with Redman to collaborate on a single titled "Good Time" and after a long process of finding a platform to release his music, he distributed his debut independent album Don't Talk, Just Listen in 2019 on streaming platforms, from his previous recordings.

== Filmography ==
Year	Title	Role	Notes
2000, 2001	Moesha	Lamont	Episodes: "Paying the Piper", "The Player"
2001	Ali	Hampton House Announcer	Credited as Theron Benymon
2002–06	Half & Half	Andre "Spencer" Williams	Main role
2005	Love on Layaway	Reggie	
2006	Where Is Love Waiting	James	
2006	Life Is Not a Fairytale: The Fantasia Barrino Story	Rodney Birks	TV movie
2007	The Game	Damon Ainsley	Episodes: "Media Blitz", "The Truth Hurts"
2008	Cuttin Da Mustard	Jury	
2008	Nite Tales: The Movie	Mitch	"Storm" role
2009	See Dick Run	Bash	
2009	Steppin: The Movie	Bryan	
2010	Perfect Combination	Suave	
2010	Speed-Dating	Dog	
2011	The Trap Door	Bruce	
2011	Streets	Detective Alba	
2012	Let's Stay Together	Bakari	Episode: "U Say He's Just a Friend"
2012	House Arrest	Chris	
2012	Guardian of Eden	Rahim	
2012	Because I Love You	Adam	TV Movie
2012	In Sickness and in Health	Norman	TV movie
2012	Hollywood Heights	Rick	Episodes: "The Text Spoof", "Loren Talks Business"
2013	24 Hour Love	Chance	
2013	Act Like You Love Me	Russell	
2013–15	The Haunted Hathaways	Ray Preston	Main role
2014	The Thundermans	Ray Preston	Crossover episode: "The Haunted Thundermans"
2014	Blood Lines	Stanley	
2014	One Love	Nate Winters	8 episodes
2015	Death's Door	Bruce	
2015	The Cheater	John	Short film
2016	Soul Ties	Anthony	
2018	Do's and Don't's of Dating	Scott Hall	
2018	When It Comes Around	Randal	
2019	Bunk'd	Randy	Episode: "Lake Rancid"
2019	A Second Chance	Darius Cole	Tubi original film
2020	The Perfect Mate	Jesse James	
2021	Lazarus	Twitch	

== Music ==
=== Studio album ===
- Don't Talk, Just Listen (Finao Music Group, 2019)

=== Unreleased singles ===
as solo artist

- "I Need Your Love" - (single produced by Tim & Bob)
- "Good Time" - (single featuring Redman)
- "Want It" - (single featuring Fabolous)
- "Weakness"
- "Mixed Up"
- :"All of It"

*All selected tracks appear on YouTube, but didn't make the final official album release, majority of songs from the debut album also appear on the unofficial "Good Time" EP

as Trā-Knox

- "All I Do" (cover)
- "Special" (written by Wanya Morris)
- "A Lil' While"
- "Something's Got To Give"
- "Believe N My Love"
- "Goodbye" (a father's dedication to Trā-Knox members, written by Chico Benymon)

*All selected track were unreleased, featured on Chico Benymon's official YouTube channel

=== Vocal appearances ===
Featured as Trā-Knox

- "I'm Comin' (featuring Trā-Knox) - Album: Willennium, Will Smith
- "Black Suits Comin' (Nod Ya Head)" (featuring Trā-Knox) - Albums Born to Reign, Will Smith / Men in Black II Soundtrack
- "Lucky Day" (featuring Trā-Knox) - Album: Wild Wild West Soundtrack

Featured as solo artist

- "Stay the Night" - K. Smith featuring Chico Benymon
- "Streets" - Naam Brigade featuring Chico Benymon (appeared in the film "Streets" soundtrack - 2011)
- "You're All I Want" Maurice Benymon featuring Chico Benymon - 2019 (Music video appearance and background vocals)

=== Tours and appearances ===
- The Love Again Tour (featuring Soul For Real & Hi Five, w/ opening acts Intro & Chico Benymon) - 2018
- NYC International Ball (featuring Slick Rick w/ Allure & special guest Chico Benymon) - 2017
- The R&B Extravaganza (featuring Carl Thomas, Case, Lil Mo', Intro & Chico Benymon) - 2017

=== Music Videos ===
as independent artist

Year	Title	Album
2012	All of It	Unreleased single
2016	Love Affair	Don't Talk, Just Listen (2019)
2018	Good Time feat. Redman	Unreleased single
2019	Nympho	Don't Talk, Just Listen (2019)
2019	I Love You	Don't Talk, Just Listen (2019)
2019	My Day 1	Don't Talk, Just Listen (2019)
2019	My Love is Real	Don't Talk, Just Listen (2019)
2021	Lies About Us	Don't Talk, Just Listen (2019)
