= JaVale McGee =

American basketball player (born 1988)

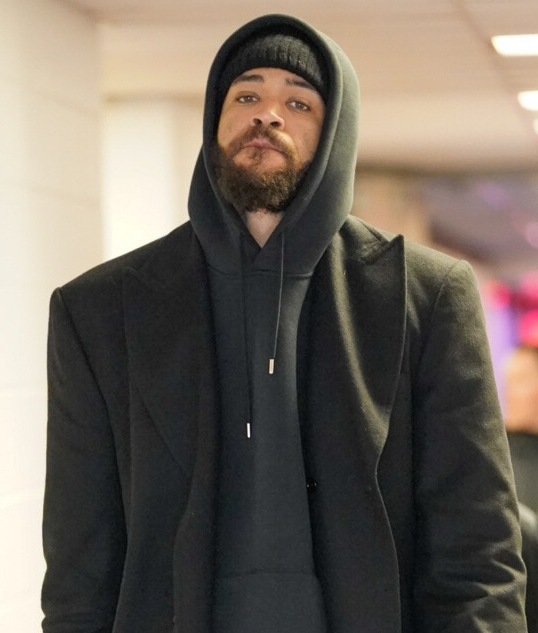
- McGee in 2018

No. 11 – Shanghai Sharks
- Position: Center
- League: CBA

Personal information
- Born: January 19, 1988 (age 38) Flint, Michigan, U.S.
- Listed height: 7 ft 0 in (2.13 m)
- Listed weight: 270 lb (122 kg)

Career information
- High school: Detroit Country Day (Beverly Hills, Michigan); Providence Christian (Fremont, Michigan); Hales Franciscan (Chicago, Illinois)
- College: Nevada (2006–2008)
- NBA draft: 2008: 1st round, 18th overall pick
- Drafted by: Washington Wizards
- Playing career: 2008–present

Career history
- 2008–2012: Washington Wizards
- 2012–2015: Denver Nuggets
- 2015: Philadelphia 76ers
- 2015–2016: Dallas Mavericks
- 2016–2018: Golden State Warriors
- 2018–2020: Los Angeles Lakers
- 2020–2021: Cleveland Cavaliers
- 2021: Denver Nuggets
- 2021–2022: Phoenix Suns
- 2022–2023: Dallas Mavericks
- 2023–2024: Sacramento Kings
- 2025: Vaqueros de Bayamón
- 2025–2026: Illawarra Hawks
- 2026: Beijing Ducks
- 2026–present: Shanghai Sharks

Career highlights
- 3× NBA champion (2017, 2018, 2020); BSN champion (2025); BSN Defensive Player of the Year (2025)
- Stats at NBA.com
- Stats at Basketball Reference
Medals
Men's basketball
Representing the United States
Olympic Games
| Gold medal – first place | 2020 Tokyo | Team |

JaVale Lindy McGee (/dʒəˈveɪl/ jə-VAYL; born January 19, 1988) is an American professional basketball player for the Shanghai Sharks of the Chinese Basketball Association (CBA). He played college basketball for the Nevada Wolf Pack and was selected 18th overall by the Washington Wizards in the 2008 NBA draft. McGee is a three-time NBA champion, having won consecutive titles with the Golden State Warriors in 2017 and 2018 before winning a third title with the Los Angeles Lakers in 2020. The son of Olympic gold medalist Pamela McGee, he won a gold medal with the 2020 U.S. Olympic team.

== High school and college career ==
McGee was born in Flint, Michigan, and attended two high schools in Michigan, Detroit Country Day School and Providence Christian, before transferring to Hales Franciscan High School in Chicago, Illinois. According to Hales Franciscan coach Gary London, McGee's natural position in college was ideally small forward, and he could play both forward spots.

McGee was the starting center for the University of Nevada. After averaging 14.3 points and 7.3 rebounds and shooting 53% from the field and 33% from three-point range as a sophomore, McGee decided to hire an agent and declare for the 2008 NBA draft.

== Professional career ==
=== Washington Wizards (2008–2012) ===
McGee was selected 18th overall by the Wizards in the 2008 NBA draft. On July 9, 2008, he signed a two-year, $2.4 million deal with the Wizards.

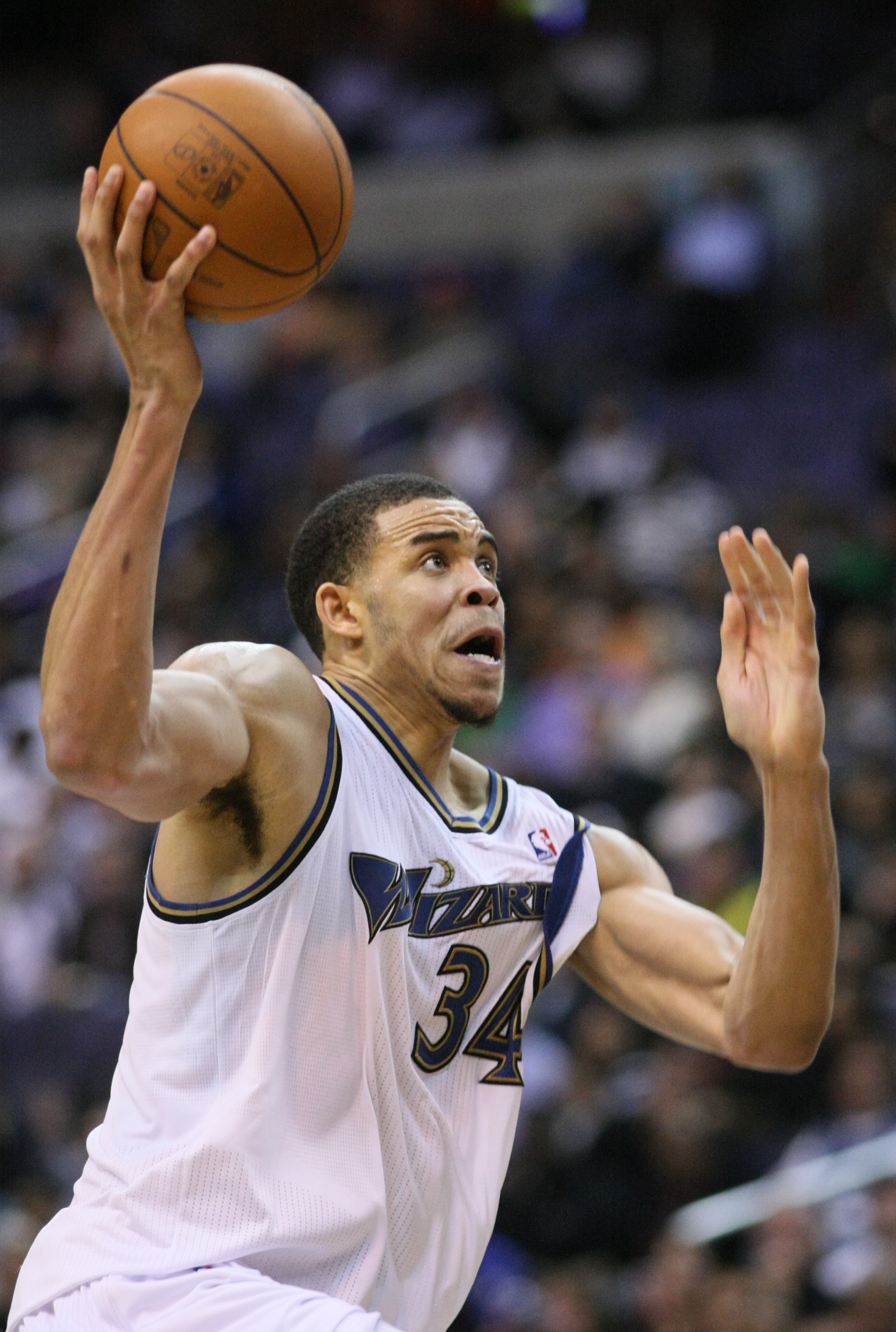
McGee in 2010

On January 9, 2010, the Wizards fined McGee $10,000 for participating in Gilbert Arenas' antics before a game against the Philadelphia 76ers four days prior. Arenas was being investigated for a prior incident involving guns in the Wizards' locker room, but made light of the accusations by pointing his finger at his teammates, as if he were shooting them. His teammates were photographed smiling and laughing with him.

On January 6, 2011, McGee was chosen to participate in the 2011 NBA Slam Dunk Contest. He was the first Wizard to ever participate in the contest. McGee finished in second place, losing to Blake Griffin. McGee was the first player to use three balls at one time in a dunk contest, which was later cited by the Guinness World Records as the most basketballs dunked in a single jump. The third ball was passed to him from teammate John Wall.

On March 15, 2011, in a 98–79 loss against the Chicago Bulls, McGee notched his first career triple-double, recording 11 points, 12 rebounds, and 12 blocks. McGee's career-high 12 blocks was the most since Keon Clark had 12 on March 23, 2001. However, McGee received some criticism for taking ill-advised shots in the fourth quarter to ensure he reached 10 points while his team was being blown out, and even received a technical foul for excessive celebration by pulling himself on the rim after a dunk for his final points. Television commentator Kevin McHale called it a "bad triple-double". In response to the criticism, McGee said, "I got a triple-double. Who can say they got a triple-double? I'm not really worried about it."

During the 2011 NBA lockout, NBPA leaders met with around 30 players on October 14 and stressed unity. McGee left the meeting early and told reporters there were some players "saying that they're ready to fold", but the majority was united. McGee later denied mentioning that players were ready to fold, but his comment was recorded by reporters. Derek Fisher said that McGee had "no ability to make that statement" based on the limited time he spent at the meeting.

McGee averaged over 10 points and eight rebounds in 2010–11 and 2011–12 with the Wizards.

=== Denver Nuggets (2012–2015) ===
On March 15, 2012, McGee was traded to the Nuggets along with Ronny Turiaf in a deal that sent Nenê to the Wizards. As a member of the Wizards, McGee started 40 of 41 games in which he appeared; with the Nuggets, he would start in five of 20 games in which he appeared. McGee's minutes would also be reduced, averaging 27.4 with Washington but 20.6 with Denver. On March 21, in his Nuggets debut, McGee made the game-winning dunk off an Arron Afflalo missed free throw with five seconds left on the clock. At the end of the regular season, the Nuggets earned the West's sixth seed, and McGee appeared in the 2012 NBA playoffs, which was his first playoff appearance in his career. McGee's series-high was 21 points in Game 5 against first-round opponent Los Angeles Lakers. His numbers were up and down throughout the series, including Game 7, when McGee scored just six points on 1–7 shooting in 32 minutes of floor time. On July 18, 2012, McGee re-signed with the Nuggets on a four-year, $44 million contract.

McGee's 2013–14 season was ended on February 20, 2014, when he underwent surgery to repair a stress fracture in his left tibia in which he sustained on November 8, 2013.

On October 29, 2014, McGee made his return for the Nuggets, recording two points and two rebounds in the season opening 89–79 victory over the Detroit Pistons.

=== Philadelphia 76ers (2015) ===
On February 19, 2015, McGee was traded, along with the rights to Chukwudiebere Maduabum and a 2015 first-round pick, to the Philadelphia 76ers in exchange for the rights to Cenk Akyol. On March 1, McGee was waived by the 76ers after appearing in six games.

=== Dallas Mavericks (2015–2016) ===
On August 13, 2015, McGee signed with the Dallas Mavericks. He missed the team's first 13 games of the 2015–16 season due to a stress fracture in his left tibia. On November 22, McGee made his debut for the Mavericks, playing in just under 11 minutes off the bench, recording eight points and six rebounds in a 117–114 loss to the Oklahoma City Thunder. On January 5, 2016, he recorded season highs of 13 points and 11 rebounds in a 117–116 narrow double overtime victory over the Sacramento Kings.

On July 8, 2016, McGee was waived by the Mavericks.

=== Golden State Warriors (2016–2018) ===
On September 16, 2016, McGee signed with the Golden State Warriors. On December 15, he scored a season-high 17 points in a 103–90 victory over the New York Knicks. On March 31, 2017, McGee had 13 points and a season-best five blocked shots in a 107–98 victory over the Houston Rockets. The Warriors went on to win the 2017 NBA Finals after defeating the Cleveland Cavaliers in five games. McGee played in 77 of 82 regular season games, with a field goal percentage of .652, and 16 of 17 playoff games, with a percentage of .732, both the best in his career. The Warriors finished the playoffs with a 16–1 record, the best postseason winning percentage in NBA history.

On August 1, 2017, McGee re-signed with the Warriors on a one-year contract. His playing time increased when he was inserted into the starting lineup after the all-star break. In June 2018, McGee won his second straight championship after the Warriors defeated the Cavaliers in a four-game sweep during the NBA Finals. McGee started the final three games of the series, and averaged 8.0 points in the four games.

=== Los Angeles Lakers (2018–2020) ===
On July 10, 2018, McGee signed with the Los Angeles Lakers. He missed seven games in December due to a respiratory infection. On March 22, 2019, McGee had career highs of 33 points and 20 rebounds to go along with six blocked shots during a 111–106 loss to the Brooklyn Nets.

During the 2019–20 season, McGee played in 68 games and averaged 6.6 points and 5.7 rebounds in 16.6 minutes per game. He won his third NBA championship as a member of the Lakers in 2020.

=== Cleveland Cavaliers (2020–2021) ===
On November 23, 2020, McGee was traded from the Los Angeles Lakers to the Cleveland Cavaliers in exchange for Alfonzo McKinnie and Jordan Bell. On December 23, McGee made his debut for the team in a 121–114 victory over Charlotte Hornets and recorded 13 points and seven rebounds off the bench.

=== Return to Denver (2021) ===
On March 25, 2021, McGee was traded to the Denver Nuggets in exchange for center Isaiah Hartenstein and two future second-round picks.

=== Phoenix Suns (2021–2022) ===
On August 16, 2021, McGee signed with the Phoenix Suns.

=== Return to Dallas (2022–2023) ===
On July 9, 2022, McGee signed with the Dallas Mavericks. He was waived on August 29, 2023.

=== Sacramento Kings (2023–2024) ===
On September 2, 2023, McGee signed with the Sacramento Kings. After debuting with the Kings, he matched his mother Pamela in playing for professional basketball franchises in Dallas, Los Angeles, and Sacramento.

=== Vaqueros de Bayamón (2025) ===
On January 31, 2025, McGee signed with the Vaqueros de Bayamón of the Baloncesto Superior Nacional (BSN) in Puerto Rico. During the season, he played alongside fellow former NBA players Danilo Gallinari, Chirs Duarte, and Renaldo Balkman.

On June 2, McGee was announced as a starter for the international players' team, Los Refuerzos, in the BSN All-Star Game, alongside Gallinari, Duarte, Emmanuel Mudiay, and Travis Trice. On June 23, McGee recorded a regular-season high of 33 points and nine rebounds in a 116–111 overtime loss to the Piratas de Quebradillas, shooting 14-of-15 from the field.

Following the regular season, McGee was named the Baloncesto Superior Nacional Defensive Player of the Year and selected to the All-BSN First Team.

During the playoffs, McGee helped Bayamón advance to the BSN Finals against the Leones de Ponce. On August 7, he matched his season-high 33 points while adding 12 rebounds and two blocks in a 100–79 victory in Game 3 of the championship series, giving Bayamón a 2–1 series lead. McGee ultimately helped the Vaqueros defeat Ponce 4–1 to capture the 2025 BSN championship.

=== Illawarra Hawks (2025–2026) ===
On August 1, 2025, McGee signed with the Illawarra Hawks of the Australian National Basketball League (NBL) for the 2025–26 season. In his debut for the Hawks on September 27, 2025, he recorded 32 points and 13 rebounds in a 91–86 loss to the Tasmania JackJumpers. On November 5, he recorded 37 points and 14 rebounds in a 107–93 win over Melbourne United. He was named the Hawks' Club MVP.

=== Beijing Ducks (2026) ===
On 17 February 2026, McGee signed with the Beijing Ducks of the Chinese Basketball Association (CBA). In 19 regular season games, he averaged 12.6 points and 6.5 rebounds in 14.9 minutes per game, helping the Ducks to a fourth place finish. After defeating the Guangdong Southern Tigers in the first round, the Ducks lost to the eventual champions Shanghai Sharks in the second round.

=== Shanghai Sharks (2026–present) ===
On October 1, 2026, McGee signed with the Shanghai Sharks. He was waived by the club in the beginning of November, after having appeared in 8 games where he averaged 5.1 points, 2.9 rebounds and 1.1 blocks in 11 minutes per game.

== Career statistics ==
Legend
| GP | Games played | GS | Games started | MPG | Minutes per game |
| FG% | Field goal percentage | 3P% | 3-point field goal percentage | FT% | Free throw percentage |
| RPG | Rebounds per game | APG | Assists per game | SPG | Steals per game |
| BPG | Blocks per game | PPG | Points per game | **Bold** | Career high |
| † | Won an NBA championship |

=== NBA ===
==== Regular season ====
| Year | Team | GP | GS | MPG | FG% | 3P% | FT% | RPG | APG | SPG | BPG | PPG |
|---|---|---|---|---|---|---|---|---|---|---|---|---|
| 2008–09 | Washington | 75 | 14 | 15.2 | .494 | — | .660 | 3.9 | .3 | .4 | 1.0 | 6.5 |
| 2009–10 | Washington | 60 | 19 | 16.1 | .508 | .000 | .638 | 4.0 | .2 | .3 | 1.7 | 6.4 |
| 2010–11 | Washington | **79** | **75** | **27.8** | .550 | .000 | .583 | 8.0 | .5 | .5 | 2.4 | 10.1 |
| 2011–12 | Washington | 41 | 40 | 27.4 | .535 | — | .500 | **8.8** | .6 | **.6** | **2.5** | 11.9 |
| 2011–12 | Denver | 20 | 5 | 20.5 | .612 | — | .373 | 5.8 | .3 | .5 | 1.6 | 10.3 |
| 2012–13 | Denver | **79** | 0 | 18.1 | .575 | **1.000** | .591 | 4.8 | .3 | .4 | 2.0 | 9.1 |
| 2013–14 | Denver | 5 | 5 | 15.9 | .447 | — | **1.000** | 3.4 | .4 | .2 | 1.4 | 7.0 |
| 2014–15 | Denver | 17 | 0 | 11.4 | .557 | — | .690 | 2.8 | .1 | .1 | 1.1 | 5.2 |
| 2014–15 | Philadelphia | 6 | 0 | 10.2 | .444 | — | .500 | 2.2 | .3 | .0 | .2 | 3.0 |
| 2015–16 | Dallas | 34 | 2 | 10.9 | .575 | .000 | .500 | 3.9 | .1 | .1 | .8 | 5.1 |
| 2016–17† | Golden State | 77 | 10 | 9.6 | **.652** | .000 | .505 | 3.2 | .2 | .2 | .9 | 6.1 |
| 2017–18† | Golden State | 65 | 17 | 9.5 | .621 | .000 | .731 | 2.6 | .5 | .3 | .9 | 4.8 |
| 2018–19 | L.A. Lakers | 75 | 62 | 22.3 | .624 | .083 | .634 | 7.5 | .7 | **.6** | 2.0 | **12.0** |
| 2019–20† | L.A. Lakers | 68 | 68 | 16.6 | .637 | .500 | .646 | 5.7 | .5 | .5 | 1.4 | 6.6 |
| 2020–21 | Cleveland | 33 | 1 | 15.2 | .521 | .250 | .655 | 5.2 | **1.0** | .5 | 1.2 | 8.0 |
| 2020–21 | Denver | 13 | 1 | 13.5 | .478 | .000 | .667 | 5.3 | .5 | .2 | 1.1 | 5.5 |
| 2021–22 | Phoenix | 74 | 17 | 15.8 | .629 | .222 | .699 | 6.7 | .6 | .3 | 1.1 | 9.2 |
| 2022–23 | Dallas | 42 | 7 | 8.4 | .640 | .400 | .585 | 2.5 | .3 | .1 | .6 | 4.4 |
| 2023–24 | Sacramento | 46 | 0 | 7.4 | .598 | .143 | .578 | 2.7 | .4 | .3 | .4 | 4.0 |
| Career | | 909 | 343 | 16.1 | .578 | .192 | .604 | 5.0 | .4 | .4 | 1.4 | 7.6 |

==== Playoffs ====
| Year | Team | GP | GS | MPG | FG% | 3P% | FT% | RPG | APG | SPG | BPG | PPG |
|---|---|---|---|---|---|---|---|---|---|---|---|---|
| 2012 | Denver | 7 | 0 | **25.9** | .434 | — | .538 | **9.6** | **.7** | **.7** | **3.1** | **8.6** |
| 2013 | Denver | 6 | 2 | 18.7 | .581 | — | .389 | 5.2 | .0 | **.7** | 1.0 | 7.2 |
| 2016 | Dallas | 2 | 0 | 7.0 | .500 | — | .333 | 1.5 | .0 | .5 | .0 | 2.0 |
| 2017† | Golden State | **16** | 1 | 9.3 | **.732** | — | .722 | 3.0 | .3 | .1 | .9 | 5.9 |
| 2018† | Golden State | 13 | 9 | 12.2 | .672 | .000 | .684 | 3.2 | .3 | .2 | 1.3 | 6.5 |
| 2020† | L.A. Lakers | 14 | **11** | 9.6 | .625 | .000 | .500 | 3.1 | .5 | .1 | .7 | 2.9 |
| 2021 | Denver | 4 | 0 | 8.5 | .300 | .000 | .333 | 3.0 | .8 | .3 | 1.3 | 2.0 |
| 2022 | Phoenix | 12 | 0 | 11.1 | .700 | .000 | **.846** | 4.0 | .6 | .3 | .4 | 6.8 |
| Career | | 74 | 23 | 12.4 | .616 | .000 | .571 | 4.0 | .4 | .3 | 1.0 | 5.6 |

=== College ===
| Year | Team | GP | GS | MPG | FG% | 3P% | FT% | RPG | APG | SPG | BPG | PPG |
|---|---|---|---|---|---|---|---|---|---|---|---|---|
| 2006–07 | Nevada | **33** | 0 | 10.0 | **.600** | **.667** | .471 | 2.2 | .1 | .2 | .9 | 3.3 |
| 2007–08 | Nevada | **33** | **31** | **27.3** | .529 | .333 | **.525** | **7.3** | **.6** | **.8** | **2.8** | **14.1** |
| Career | | 66 | 31 | 18.7 | .542 | .356 | .514 | 4.8 | .3 | .5 | 1.8 | 8.7 |

== National team career ==
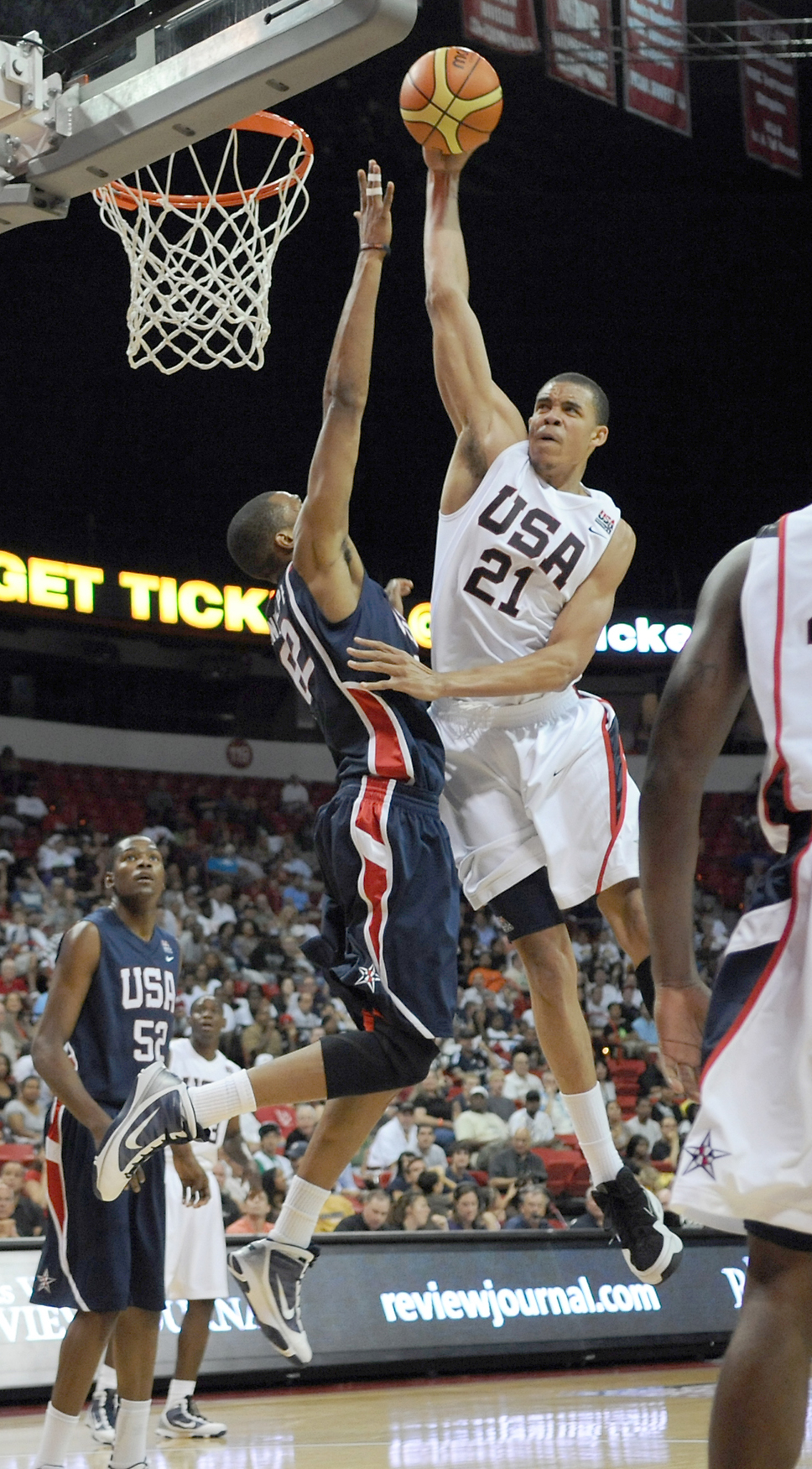
McGee during an exhibition match in 2009

McGee received an invite to the U.S. national team's mini-camp in the summer of 2009 and again in the summer of 2010. He played with Team USA in a scrimmage at Radio City Music Hall during the 2010 World Basketball Festival, but after an uneven performance, McGee did not play in the team's scrimmage against China at Madison Square Garden and was cut on August 15, 2010.

McGee visited the Philippines twice during the 2011 NBA lockout, first in exhibition games with NBA stars against players from the Philippine Basketball Association and the Smart Gilas national team, and then in a basketball clinic. Later that year, McGee expressed his interest in playing for the Philippine national team, and in 2012, a bill was filed for his Filipino citizenship to make him eligible to play for Smart Gilas. In 2014, McGee was asked again by the Gilas Pilipinas to take part as a naturalized player for the 2014 FIBA Basketball World Cup in Spain. However, national teams were limited to one naturalized player apiece, and former Wizards teammate Andray Blatche made the World Cup team after he was granted citizenship.

McGee and forward Keldon Johnson of the San Antonio Spurs were announced as replacements for Bradley Beal and Kevin Love on the 2020 U.S. Olympic team. On August 7, 2021, McGee won an Olympic gold medal after United States defeated France in the final. With the medal, he and his mother, Pamela McGee, became the first mother and son to win gold medals in Olympic history.

== Philanthropy ==
In 2013, McGee started Juglife Foundation, an organization that brings awareness of drinking water and hydration. He has hosted celebrity softball games involving his NBA colleagues. Juglife has partnered with Hope 4 Kids International in building wells in Uganda.

== Personal life ==
McGee's father, 6-foot-10-inch (2.08 m) George Montgomery, was a 1985 second-round draft selection by the Portland Trail Blazers, though he did not play for the team. His mother, 6-foot-3-inch (1.91 m) Pamela McGee, was a University of Southern California standout who played with her twin sister, Paula, and Cheryl Miller, and won two NCAA Division I championships, in 1983 and 1984. Prior to that, Pamela won two Michigan state championships at Northern Flint High School. She won an Olympic gold medal in 1984. Besides playing in France, Italy and Brazil, Pamela was drafted in the 1997 WNBA draft by the Sacramento Monarchs, and played for the Monarchs and Los Angeles Sparks. McGee is the first son of a WNBA player to ever play in the NBA. His younger half-sister, Imani McGee-Stafford, is also a professional basketball player who previously played in the WNBA for both the Chicago Sky and the Atlanta Dream. His mother, with a degree in economics, balanced her international basketball career with raising both children, homeschooling, coaching and teaching school in the offseason. McGee is also cousins with former NFL defensive end Jarron Gilbert.

In 2013, it was announced that McGee would be starring in his own reality television show, Mom's Got Game, with his mother. McGee had the largest documented armspan of any current NBA player at 7 ft 6.5 in (2.30 m) until the Nuggets drafted Rudy Gobert, with an armspan at 7 ft 8.5 in (2.35 m) in the 2013 NBA draft. McGee has been featured regularly on Inside the NBA's basketball blooper feature "Shaqtin' a Fool", earning the nickname "Tragic Bronson", a play on Magic Johnson, from Shaquille O'Neal. McGee has expressed displeasure at his frequent appearance on the segment. McGee became a full-time vegan in the summer of 2017. He had dabbled with the diet for a few years, using it before each season to lose weight. McGee committed to it full-time after seeing how his body responded during the Warriors' championship season in 2016–17.

McGee is also a record producer under the moniker Pierre. He has a studio in Inglewood and released his self-titled debut album in 2018. In 2020, McGee co-produced "Available" with Poo Bear and HARV on Justin Bieber's record, Changes.

== See also ==
- List of NBA career field goal percentage leaders
- List of NBA single-game blocks leaders
