= Twice as Nice =

- Directed by: Jessie Maple
- Written by: S. Pearl Sharp
- Produced by: Jessie Maple; Leroy Patton
- Starring: Pamela McGee; Paula McGee; Cynthia Cooper-Dyke
- Cinematography: LeRoy Patton
- Release date: 1989
- Running time: 70 minutes
- Country: United States
- Language: English

Twice as Nice is a 1989 drama film directed by Jessie Maple and starring Pamela McGee, Paula McGee, and Cynthia Cooper-Dyke. It was Maple's second feature, making her the first African-American woman to direct two feature films.

== Premise ==
The film follows twins Caren and Camilla Parker (played by real-life twins Pamela and Paula McGee), two young college basketball stars at Columbia University, as they navigate talent, competition, and relationships while vying for the first female MBA pick.

== Cast ==
- Pamela McGee and Paula McGee as Caren and Camilla Parker
- Cynthia Cooper-Dyke as Damita Jean Johnson
- Stephanie Lynn Wilson as Loretta

== Themes ==
This film shed light on women basketball players and was released years before the WNBA was created. The plot examines sisterhood, success, and competition, while the camera captures mundane moments and transform them into an intimate and humanist study on family.

== Production ==
This was Maple's second feature film, released eight years after her debut Will. Maple hired non-professional actors, such as WNBA player and coach Cynthia Cooper-Dyke.

Poet and actress S. Pearl Sharp wrote the screenplay.

== Restoration ==
In 2015, Twice as Nice was one of 57 films saved by a grant from the National Film Preservation Foundation. The restoration was made possible when the Academy Film Archive uncovered the original picture and track elements at the DuArt Film Lab. The final restoration will be "a 16mm preservation element, a 16mm release print, and a digital master of the film".

=== Screenings ===
- Tell It Like It Is: Black Independents in New York, 1968 – 1986, Film Society Lincoln Center, 2015
- One Way Or Another, Black Women's Cinema, 1970–1991, Brooklyn Academy of Music, 2017
