= Loretta Devine =

American actress (born 1949)

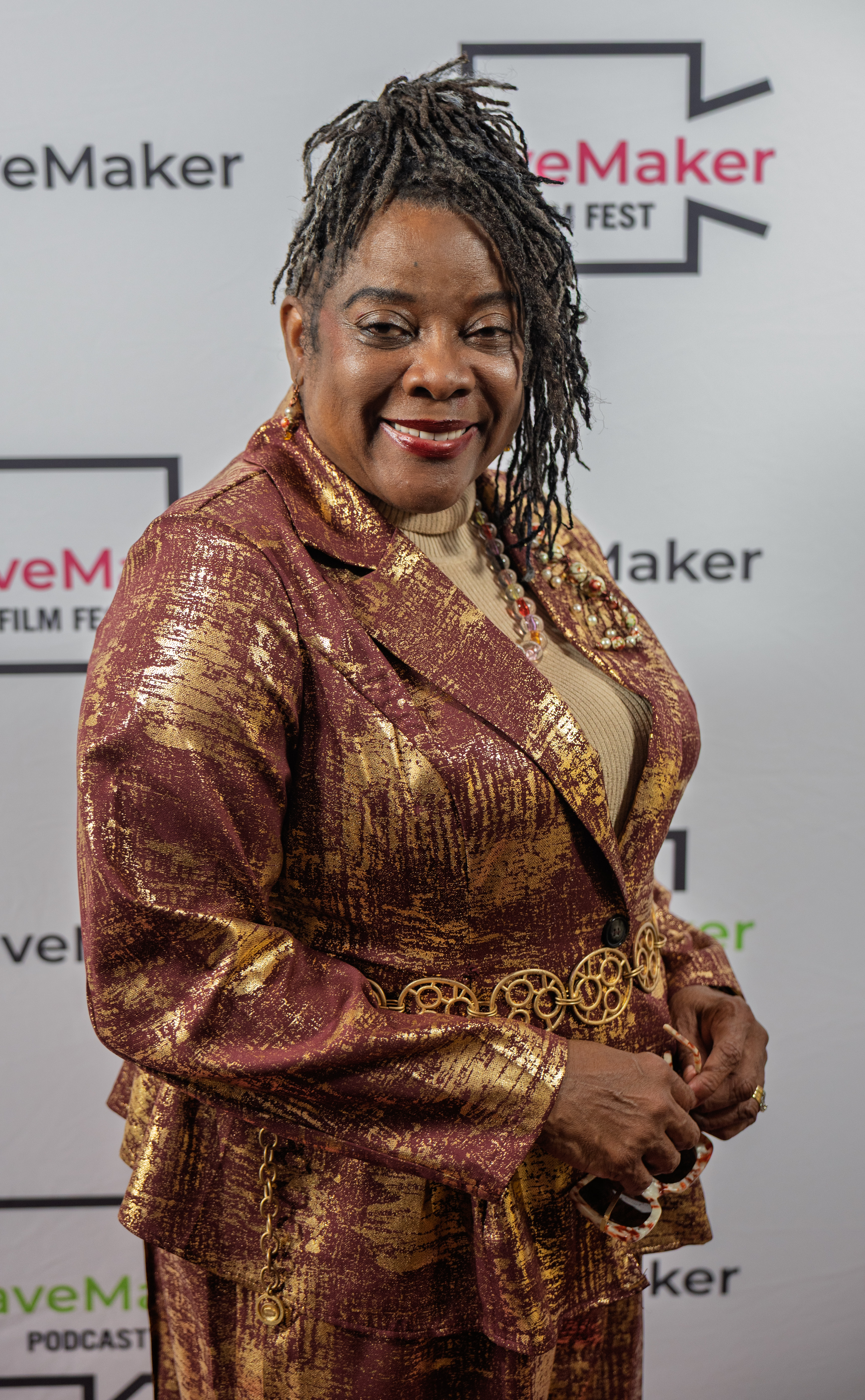
- Devine at the BraveMaker Film Festival in 2026
- Born: August 21, 1949 (age 77); Houston, Texas, U.S.
- Education: University of Houston (BA); Brandeis University (MFA)
- Occupation: Actress
- Years active: 1977–present
- Awards: Full list

Loretta Devine (born August 21, 1949) is an American actress. She is known for numerous roles across stage and screen. Her most high profile roles include Lorrell Robinson in the original Broadway production of Dreamgirls (1981), Muriel Stubbs in the Fox/The WB series, The PJs (1999-2001), Hallie in the Disney Junior series, Doc McStuffins (2012-2022), Amelia "M'Dear" McKellan in the Netflix series, Family Reunion (2019-2022), Gloria Matthews in the film Waiting to Exhale (1995), and her recurring role as Adele Webber on the medical drama Grey's Anatomy, for which she won a Primetime Emmy Award for Outstanding Guest Actress in a Drama Series.

Devine also played Juanita Sims in the film adaptation of For Colored Girls (2010). She is also known for her roles as Stevie Rallen on NBC's A Different World during its first season and for her portrayal Marla Hendricks on the television series Boston Public (2000–2004).

== Early life ==
Loretta Devine was born in Houston, Texas, on August 21, 1949 to James Devine and Eunice (Toliver). She grew up in the Acres Homes area of Houston, where her mother was a single mother to six children. She was very active on the pep squad, and performed in talent shows at George Washington Carver High School.

In 1971, Devine graduated from the University of Houston with a Bachelor of Arts in Speech and Drama. In 1976, she received a Master of Fine Arts in Theater from Brandeis University.

== Career ==
=== Stage work ===
Devine has worked extensively on Broadway. Her Broadway debut was in the 1977 revival of Hair, which played 43 performances at the Biltmore Theatre. The following year, Devine appeared in a musical called A Broadway Musical, which closed after 14 previews and only one performance on December 21, 1978. She captured attention in her third Broadway show, called Comin' Uptown, a Harlem-set musical adaptation of A Christmas Carol, featuring Gregory Hines.

She rose to stardom in Dreamgirls, a smash 1981 Broadway musical loosely based on the history of The Supremes, in which she originated the role of Lorrell Robinson, a fictional character based on Mary Wilson. The story of Dreamgirls was created during 6-week-long workshops that occurred across a three year period, wherein Devine, Sheryl Lee Ralph, and Jennifer Holliday improvised their characters.

She received rave reviews in the 1995 Apollo revival of The Wiz as Glinda the Good Witch of the South. In May 2024, she starred in The Preacher’s Wife, a musical that began its run in Atlanta at The Alliance Theatre and is based on the previous films.

=== Film ===
While rehearsing for Dreamgirls in 1981, Devine was cast in Jessie Maple's Will, the first independent feature-length film directed by an African-American woman. For her featured role in the low-budget film, Devine earned $500. Minor roles for Devine followed in films such as Little Nikita and Stanley & Iris.

In 1995, she landed a major role as Gloria Matthews in Waiting to Exhale, opposite Whitney Houston, Gregory Hines, and Angela Bassett. The role earned her an NAACP Image Award for Outstanding Supporting Actress in a Motion Picture, as did her next film, The Preacher's Wife, her second film with Houston and Hines. She later co-starred opposite Alfre Woodard in Down in the Delta (1998) and Funny Valentines (1999).

She has a cameo performance in the film version of Dreamgirls.

=== Television and continued film successes ===
Devine played roles as a repertory character in the play The Colored Museum with Vickilyn Reynolds. Devine and Reynolds both went on to play sisters in the short-lived TV series Sugar and Spice. During the period between the play and the series, Devine appeared in the first season of the TV series A Different World as Stevie Rallen, a dormitory director at the fictional Hillman College.

From 2000 to 2004, Devine starred as high school teacher Marla Hendricks on the Fox drama series Boston Public. Devine won three more NAACP Image Awards for her work in the series. She also continued to work in film, playing prominent roles in Urban Legend, Urban Legends: Final Cut, and I Am Sam. Devine earned yet another Image Award nomination and an Independent Spirit Award nomination for her work in the 2004 film Woman Thou Art Loosed. She also appeared in the 2005 film Crash.

In 2007, she appeared in This Christmas, and in the next year had a series regular role on the ABC comedy-drama Eli Stone. Devine also was part of the ensemble casts of two Tyler Perry-directed films For Colored Girls and Madea's Big Happy Family. In 2008, she was featured prominently on George Michael's remake of the song "Feeling Good." She also appeared in First Sunday, Beverly Hills Chihuahua and Jumping the Broom.

Devine had a recurring role in the Shonda Rhimes drama series Grey's Anatomy as Dr. Richard Webber's first wife, Adele. In 2011 she won a Primetime Emmy Award for Outstanding Guest Actress in a Drama Series for her performance. She was nominated for a second time for her performance in 2012. Devine also won Gracie Allen Award for Outstanding Female Actor in a Feature Role for Grey's Anatomy in 2012.

In 2011, she also starred on the short-lived ABC Family comedy State of Georgia. In 2012, she was part of Being Mary Jane cast. She also voiced the character Hallie on the Disney Junior series Doc McStuffins. Later that year she began starring in the Lifetime series The Client List, playing the role of Georgia Cummings, the owner of the massage parlor where the lead character Riley Parks works. The series was canceled after two seasons. Devine also played Cynthia Carmichael on the NBC sitcom The Carmichael Show. Devine starred on the Netflix series, Family Reunion, with Richard Roundtree and Tia Mowry-Hardrict.

== Filmography ==
=== Film ===
Year	Title	Role	Notes
1981	Will	Will's Wife	
1983	Anna to the Infinite Power	Ms. Everett Benson	
1988	Little Nikita	Verna McLaughlin	
1988	Sticky Fingers	Diane Cooley	
1990	Stanley & Iris	Bertha Simmons	
1991	Caged Fear	Judy	
1991	Livin' Large	Nadine Biggs	
1992	Class Act	Ms. Brown	
1993	Amos & Andrew	Ula	
1994	The Hard Truth	Rose Maxwell	
1995	Waiting to Exhale	Gloria Matthews	
1996	The Preacher's Wife	Beverly	
1997	The Price of Kissing	Jackee Blaine	
1997	Hoodlum	Pigfoot Mary	
1997	Lover Girl	Leticia	
1998	Love Kills	Sylvia Finkelstein	
1998	Down in the Delta	Zenia	
1998	Urban Legend	Reese Wilson	
1998	Operation Splitsville	Principal	
1998	Alyson's Closet	Raul's Mother (voice)	Short
1999	Funny Valentines	Dearie B.	
1999	The Breaks	Floria	
1999	Lillie	Michelle	
2000	Punks	Aretha Stone	
2000	Urban Legends: Final Cut	Reese Wilson	
2000	What Women Want	Florence "Flo" Glover	
2001	Kingdom Come	Marguerite Slocumb	
2001	I Am Sam	Margaret Calgrove	
2002	Book of Love	Mary Baker	
2002	Baby of the Family	Delores Evans	
2004	Woman Thou Art Loosed	Cassey Jordan	
2004	Crash	Shaniqua Johnson	
2005	King's Ransom	Miss Gladys	
2006	Dirty Laundry	Evelyn	
2006	Dreamgirls	Gladys Brooks	
2007	Cougar Club	Dolly	
2007	This Christmas	Shirley Ann "Ma'Dere" Whitfield	
2008	First Sunday	Sister Doris	
2008	Beverly Hills Chihuahua	Delta (voice)	
2009	Spring Breakdown	Dr. Marguerite Tyson	
2009	My Son, My Son, What Have Ye Done?	Miss Willheima Roberts	
2010	Death at a Funeral	Cynthia	
2010	Lottery Ticket	Grandma Dorothy Carson	
2010	For Colored Girls	Juanita Sims/Green	
2010	Beverly Hills Chihuahua 2	Delta (voice)	Video
2011	Madea's Big Happy Family	Shirley	
2011	Jumping the Broom	Pamela Taylor	
2011	Politics of Love	Shirlee Gupta	
2012	In the Hive	Mrs. Inez	
2013	The Get Away	Ms. Crawford	Short
2013	Khumba	Mama V (voice)	
2013	A Very Larry Christmas	Mrs. Claus	
2014	Comeback Dad	Malinda	
2014	Welcome to Me	Barb Vaughn	
2014	The Sound and the Fury	Dilsey	
2014	You're Not You	Marilyn Jo	
2015	Back to School Mom	Meghan Graham	
2015	1440 and Counting	Mrs. Nickel	Short
2015	For the Love of Ruth	Naomi	
2016	Norm of the North	Tamecia (voice)	
2016	Caged No More	Aggie James	
2016	Grandma’s House	Grandma Margie	
2016	36 Hour Layover	Mrs. Carey	
2017	My Other Home	Mabel Marbury	
2017	Naked	Carol	
2017	Violets	Marcy	Short
2018	Sierra Burgess Is a Loser	Ms. April Thomson	
2019	The Trap	Mama Jay	
2019	First Day Back	Superintendent Lola Greene	Short
2019	Postmarked	Hattie	Short
2020	The Last Starship	Dorothy	Short
2020	Spell	Eloise	
2020	Always and Forever	Elda	
2020	The McHenry Trial - Don't Judge a Kid by Their Hoodie	Doris McHenry	Short
2021	Queen Bees	Sally Heart	
2021	The Starling	Velma	
2022	Mack & Rita	Sharon	
2022	Diary of a Wimpy Kid: Rodrick Rules	Irene	
2023	A Snowy Day in Oakland	Jeanette	
2024	Bull Street	Mrs. Big-Gal	
2024	Rock the Boat 2	-	
2024	Lost & Found in Cleveland	Joy Morris	

=== Television ===
Year	Title	Role	Notes
1986	The Core of the Apple	Herself	Episode: "Manhattan Afrodreams"
1987	CBS Summer Playhouse	Cheryl	Episode: "Sirens"
1987–88	A Different World	Stevie Rallen	Main cast (season 1)
1988	The Murder of Mary Phagan	Annie Maude Carter	2 episodes
1988	Amen	Lydia Cummings	Episode: "Court of Love"
1989	Parent Trap III	Thelma Pardrige	TV movie
1989	Heart and Soul	Tonia Harris	TV movie
1990	Murphy Brown	Nurse Diana Hawking	Episode: "The Bitch's Back"
1990	Sugar and Spice	Loretta Fontaine	Main cast
1990	Cop Rock	Juror Devine	Episode: "Marital Blitz" & "No Noose Is Good Noose"
1991	Great Performances	Janine Wills	Episode: "The Colored Museum"
1991	Reasonable Doubts	Valerie Hall	Episode: "Hard Bargains"
1992	Love & War	Donna	Episode: "For John"
1992–93	Roc	Cynthia Raine	Recurring cast (season 2)
1993	Out All Night	Crystal	Episode: "The Way We Were"
1993	Family Album	June	Episode: "Salon, Farewell, Auf Wiedersehn, Goodbye"
1993	The American Clock	Irene Mack Shaw	TV movie
1995	Picket Fences	Marla Melrose	Episode: "Close Encounters"
1995	Ned and Stacey	Mrs. Sally Duncan	Episode: "Reality Check"
1996	Rebound: The Legend of Earl 'The Goat' Manigault	Miss Mary Johnson	TV movie
1997	Touched by an Angel	Tonya Hawkins	Episode: "Amazing Grace: Part 1"
1997	Promised Land	Tonya Hawkins	Episode: "Amazing Grace: Part 2"
1997	Happily Ever After: Fairy Tales for Every Child	Mother (voice)	Episode: "The Golden Goose"
1997	Clover	Everleen Moore	TV movie
1997	Don King: Only in America	Connie Harper	TV movie
1998	E! Behind the Scenes	Herself	Episode: "Urban Legend"
1999	Moesha	Gwen "Stephanie" "Steph" Watkins	Episode: "It Takes Two"
1999	Clueless	Phyllis Holiday	Episode: "Graduation"
1999	Jackie's Back	Snookie Tate	TV movie
1999	Introducing Dorothy Dandridge	Ruby Dandridge	TV movie
1999–2001	The PJs	Muriel Stubbs (née Warren) (voice)	Main cast
2000	Family Law	Gloria Rivers	Episode: "Playing God"
2000	Ally McBeal	Nora Mills	Episode: "I Will Survive"
2000	Freedom Song	Evelyn Walker	TV movie
2000	Best Actress	Connie Travers	TV movie
2001	Intimate Portrait	Herself	Episode: "Lela Rochon"
2001	Hollywood Squares	Herself/Panelist	Recurring guest
2000–04	Boston Public	Marla Hendricks	Main cast
2003	Pyramid	Herself/Celebrity Contestant	Episode: "Nov 4, 2003"
2003	Half & Half	Erika Duke	Episode: "The Big Phat Mouth Episode: Part 1 & 2"
2004–05	Wild Card	M. Pearl McGuire	Main cast (season 2)
2005	Supernatural	Missouri Moseley	Episode: "Home"
2005–06	Girlfriends	Judge Vashti Jackson	Episode: "Trial and Errors" & "...Ain't Nothing Over There"
2005–13	Grey's Anatomy	Adele Webber	Recurring cast (season 2-4 & 7-8), guest (season 5-6 & 9)
2006	Boston Legal	Annabelle Carruthers	Episode: "The Nutcrackers"
2006	Life Is Not a Fairy Tale	Addie Collins	TV movie
2006–07	Everybody Hates Chris	Maxine	Guest (season 1), Recurring cast (season 2)
2007	Boston Legal	Judge Victoria Thomson	Episode: "Oral Contracts"
2008–09	Eli Stone	Patti Dellacroix	Main cast
2009	Cold Case	Chandra Patterson '09	Episode: "Soul"
2010	Party Down	Diane Ellison	Episode: "James Ellison Funeral"
2011	Glee	Sister Mary Constance	Episode: "Original Song"
2011	State of Georgia	Honey Dupree	Main cast
2012	RuPaul's Drag Race	Herself	Episode: "Snatch Game"
2012	Shake It Up	Judge Marsha Elliott	Episode: "Judge It Up"
2012	The Game	Grandma Donna Mack	Episode: "There's No Place Like Home"
2012	The Cleveland Show	Shirley (voice)	Episode: "Mama Drama"
2012–13	The Client List	Georgia Cummings-Clemens	Main cast
2012–20	Doc McStuffins	Hallie (voice)	Main cast
2013	Teachers	Doris	TV movie
2014	Psych	Melba Birdson	Episode: "1967: A Psych Odyssey"
2014	Sullivan & Son	Rose	Episode: "Hank Goes Black"
2014	Turbo Fast	Lydia	Episode: "Zoo Lander/Balloonatics"
2014–15	Sirens	Rosemary St. Claire	Recurring cast (season 1), guest (season 2)
2015	Being Mary Jane	CeCe Robinson	Recurring cast (season 3)
2015–17	The Carmichael Show	Cynthia Carmichael	Main cast
2016	Hollywood Game Night	Herself/Celebrity Player	Episode: "Sealed with a Kesha"
2016	Nubbin & Friends	Mrs. Sandy Johnson	Episode: "The Letter "A""
2017	The Lost Souls Cafe	Geneva	TV movie
2017	Supernatural	Missouri Moseley	Episode: "Patience"
2018	Behind the Movement	Jo Ann Robinson	TV movie
2018	Jingle Belle	Emory Simons	TV movie
2018	Dear White People	Sorbet	Episode: "Volume 2: Chapter VII"
2018	Living Biblically	Estelle Williams	Episode: "Never Let Loyalty Love You"
2018	Love Is	Rose Marie	Recurring cast
2019	A Black Lady Sketch Show	Pastor Rosetta Daniels	Episode: "Your Boss Knows You Don't Have Eyebrows"
2019	Black-ish	Lynette Mae	Recurring cast (season 6)
2019	A Sweet Christmas Romance	Mrs. Rose	TV movie
2019	A Family Reunion Christmas	Amelia 'M'Dear' McKellan	TV movie
2019–22	Family Reunion	Amelia 'M'Dear' McKellan	Main cast
2020	Cherish the Day	Herself	Episode: "Catharsis"
2020	Game On: A Comedy Crossover Event	Amelia 'M'Dear' McKellan	Episode: "Family Reunion: Remember the Family's Feud?"
2020	Connecting	Dayleen	Recurring cast
2020–22	P-Valley	Earnestine Sayles	Main cast (season 1), recurring cast (season 2)
2021	Teenage Euthanasia	God (voice)	Episode: "First Date with the Second Coming"
2021	Christmas in Harmony	Mama	TV movie
2021	Christmas Déjà Vu	Crystal	TV movie
2021–23	The Loud House	Gayle McBride (voice)	Recurring cast (season 5-6), guest (season 7)
2022	Days of Our Lives: Beyond Salem	Angela	Main cast (season 2)
2022	Eureka!	Wanda (voice)	Recurring cast
2022	RuPaul's Secret Celebrity Drag Race	Herself/Fabulosity	Episode: "I'm Coming Out: First Time in Drag!"
2022	All I Didn't Want for Christmas	Lorraine Harris	TV movie
2023	Days of Our Lives	Angela	2 episodes
2023	Doc McStuffins: The Doc and Bella Are In!	Nurse Hallie Hippo (voice)	Recurring cast
2023	God-ly	Clotho	Episode: "King of the Castle P1"
2023	Young Love	Gigi Young (voice)	Recurring cast
2023	Kingdom Business	Darlene	Recurring cast (season 2)
2024	Everybody Still Hates Chris	Maxine (voice)	Episode: "Everybody Still Hates Cheat Codes"
2024	Doctor Odyssey	Jill Manafort	Episode: "Quackers"
2024	Terry McMillan Presents: Tempted by Love	Miss Mimi	TV movie
2026	The Ms. Pat Show	Carol	2 episodes

=== Music videos ===
Year	Song	Artist
2004	"What If"	Ruben Studdard

=== Video game ===
Year	Title	Role
2015	King's Quest	Muriel Hobblepot

=== Theater ===
Year	Musical	Role	Location
1977	Hair	Dionne	Samuel J. Friedman Theatre
1977	Langston Hughes	Soloist	AMAS Repertory Theatre
1977	Karma	-	Richard Allen Center
1977	Verandah	Gloria	New Dramatists
1977	Seasons Reasons	Soloists	Henry Street Settlement Playhouse
1978	Godsong	Minister	La MaMa Experimental Theatre Club
1978	A Broadway Musical	Yenta Lady	Lunt-Fontanne Theatre
1978	Miss Truth	Loretta	Apollo Theatre
1978	Bones	-	Circle in the Square Theatre
1978	The Wiz	Glinda the Good Witch of the South	Henry Street Settlement Playhouse
1978	The Blacks	Virtue	Richard Allen Center
1979	Comin' Uptown	Young Mary	Winter Garden Theatre
1980	Lion and the Jewel	Jewel	Lincoln Center
1980	Dementos	Precious	New York City Center
1981	Dreamgirls	Lorell Robinson	Imperial Theatre
1983	The Casting of Kevin Christian	-	Shepherd Street Art Gallery
1984	Gotta Getaway!	Mermaid	Radio City Music Hall
1985	Long Time Since Yesterday	Janeen Earl-Taylor	Henry Street Settlement Playhouse
1986	Big Deal	Lilly	Broadway Theatre
1986	The Colored Museum	Lala, Wigs, and Model	Public Theaters/Susan Stein Shiva Theater
1990	Spunk	Delia	Mark Taper Forum
1990	Woman from the Town	Cissy	-
1990	A Midsummer Night's Dream	Cissy	-
1990	The Hot Mikado	Cissy	-
1991	Lady Day at Emerson's Bar and Grill	Billie Holiday	Old Globe Theatre, San Diego, CA, then Little Theatre, Phoenix, AZ, 1991
1991	Rabbit Foot	Holly Day	Los Angeles Theatre Center
1991	East Texas Hot Links	Charlesetta	The Met
1991	Rodgers, Hart, Hammerstein Tribute	Soloist	Embassy Theatre
1991	Big Moments on Broadway	Soloist	Kennedy Center Opera House
1995	The Wiz	Glinda the Good Witch of the South	Apollo Revival

== Awards and nominations ==
Year	Awards	Category	Title	Outcome
1995	Helen Hayes Award	Outstanding Supporting Actress in a Resident Musical	Hot Mikado	Nominated
1996	NAACP Image Awards	Outstanding Supporting Actress in a Motion Picture	Waiting to Exhale	Won
1997	NAACP Image Awards	Outstanding Supporting Actress in a Motion Picture	The Preacher's Wife	Won
2001	NAACP Image Awards	Outstanding Supporting Actress in a Drama Series	Boston Public	Won
2001	NAACP Image Awards	Outstanding Actress in a Television Movie, Mini-Series or Dramatic Special	Freedom Song	Won
2002	NAACP Image Awards	Outstanding Supporting Actress in a Motion Picture	Kingdom Come	Nominated
2003	NAACP Image Awards	Outstanding Supporting Actress in a Drama Series	Boston Public	Won
2003	Satellite Awards	Best Supporting Actress – Television Series Drama	Boston Public	Nominated
2004	NAACP Image Awards	Outstanding Supporting Actress in a Drama Series	Boston Public	Won
2004	Satellite Awards	Best Supporting Actress – Television Series Drama	Boston Public	Nominated
2005	NAACP Image Awards	Outstanding Supporting Actress in a Motion Picture	Woman Thou Art Loosed	Nominated
2005	Independent Spirit Awards	Best Supporting Female	Woman Thou Art Loosed	Nominated
2007	NAACP Image Awards	Outstanding Actress in a Television Movie, Mini-Series or Dramatic Special	Life Is Not a Fairy Tale	Nominated
2008	NAACP Image Awards	Outstanding Supporting Actress in a Motion Picture	This Christmas	Nominated
2009	NAACP Image Awards	Outstanding Actress in a Drama Series	Eli Stone	Nominated
2011	Primetime Emmy Awards	Outstanding Guest Actress in a Drama Series	Grey's Anatomy	Won
2012	Gracie Allen Awards	Outstanding Actress in a Featured Role	Grey's Anatomy	Won
2012	NAACP Image Awards	Outstanding Supporting Actress in a Drama Series	Grey's Anatomy	Nominated
2012	Primetime Emmy Awards	Outstanding Guest Actress in a Drama Series	Grey's Anatomy	Nominated
2012	Critics' Choice Television Awards	Best Guest Performer in a Drama Series	Grey's Anatomy	Nominated
2013	NAACP Image Awards	Outstanding Actress in a Motion Picture	In the Hive	Nominated
2013	NAACP Image Awards	Outstanding Supporting Actress in a Drama Series	Grey's Anatomy	Won
2013	NAACP Image Awards	Outstanding Performance in a Youth/Children's Series or Special	Doc McStuffins	Won
2022	Children's and Family Emmy Awards	Outstanding Lead Performance	Family Reunion	Nominated

== See also ==
- History of the African-Americans in Houston
