= Satellite Award for Best Supporting Actress – Television Series =

Retired annual television award

The Satellite Award for Best Supporting Actress in a Television Series Drama and Musical/Comedy was an award given in 2002 and 2003.

== Winners and nominees ==
=== 2000s ===
==== Drama ====
Year	Winners and nominees	Film	Role	Ref.
2002	Sarah Clarke	24	Nina Myers	
2002	Emma Caulfield	Buffy the Vampire Slayer	Anya Jenkins	
2002	Loretta Devine	Boston Public	Marla Hendricks	
2002	Alyson Hannigan	Buffy the Vampire Slayer	Willow Rosenberg	
2002	Lena Olin	Alias	Irina Derevko	
2003	Mary Steenburgen	Joan of Arcadia	Helen Girardi	
2003	Amy Acker	Angel	Illyria / Winifred Burkle	
2003	Adrienne Barbeau	Carnivàle	Ruthie	
2003	Loretta Devine	Boston Public	Marla Hendricks	
2003	Lena Olin	Alias	Irina Derevko	
2003	Gina Torres	Angel	Jasmine	

==== Musical or Comedy ====
Year	Winners and nominees	Film	Role	Ref.
2002	Doris Roberts	Everybody Loves Raymond	Marie Barone	
2002	Kelly Bishop	Gilmore Girls	Emily Gilmore	
2002	Christa Miller	Scrubs	Jordan Sullivan	
2002	Megan Mullally	Will & Grace	Karen Walker	
2002	Cynthia Nixon	Sex and the City	Miranda Hobbes	
2003	Jessica Walter	Arrested Development	Lucille Bluth	
2003	Kelly Bishop	Gilmore Girls	Emily Gilmore	
2003	Kim Cattrall	Sex and the City	Samantha Jones	
2003	Portia de Rossi	Arrested Development	Lindsay Bluth	
2003	Jane Leeves	Frasier	Daphne Moon	
2003	Christa Miller	Scrubs	Jordan Sullivan	
