= Will (1981 film) =

- Directed by: Jessie Maple
- Starring: Obaka Adedunyo; Loretta Devine
- Distributed by: 20 West
- Release date: 1981
- Country: United States
- Budget: $12,000

Will is a 1981 American drama film directed by Jessie Maple. It was the first independent feature-length film directed by an African-American woman. The movie was filmed on location in Harlem with a budget of $12,000 and featured a then-unknown Loretta Devine in her first film role.

== Plot ==
Will (Obaka Adedunyo) is a girls' basketball coach, who is battling his heroin addiction while raising a 12-year-old adopted boy (called "Little Brother") with his wife (Loretta Devine). The film includes graphic depictions of drug use, including a scene where Little Brother snorts cocaine, and portrays the effect of drugs on individuals, their families, and their communities as well as the positive results of overcoming addiction.

== Casting ==
Obaka Adedunyo earned his first film credit in the lead role of Will. Loretta Devine, an aspiring actress at that time, was rehearsing for the Broadway opening of Dreamgirls when she was cast as Will's wife. Devine, in her first film role, was paid $500.

== Legacy ==
Will won an award at the Athens International Film Festival and was used as an educational film at many New York drug rehabilitation centers. In 2013, the film was restored by the New York Women in Film and Television's Women's Film Preservation Fund. In 2024, the film was selected for preservation in the United States National Film Registry by the Library of Congress as being "culturally, historically, or aesthetically significant".
