= Nat Frazier =

American basketball coach (1935–2019)

Biographical details
- Born: April 18, 1935; Beaufort, South Carolina, U.S.
- Died: September 22, 2019 (aged 84); Columbia, Maryland, U.S.

Playing career
- ?: Tuskegee

Coaching career (HC unless noted)
- ?–1967: Delaware State (assistant)
- 1967–1971: Illinois (assistant)
- 1971–1977: Morgan State
- 1977–1978: New York Knicks (assistant)
- 1979–1980: Washington Metros
- 1980–1982: Bowie State
- 1984: Virginia Wave
- 1985–1989: Morgan State

Administrative career (AD unless noted)
- 1979–1980: Washington Metros (president)

Accomplishments and honors

Championships
- NCAA Division II tournament (1974); 2 MEAC regular season (1974, 1976); MEAC tournament (1976)

Awards
- AP College Division National Coach of the Year (1974); 2 MEAC Coach of the Year (1972, 1976)

Nathaniel Frazier (April 18, 1935 – September 22, 2019) was an American basketball coach. He was head men's coach at Morgan State University, where in 1974 he led the program to the Division II national championship.

Frazier played college basketball for Tuskegee University, where he was twice named to the All-Southern Intercollegiate Athletic Conference team. After several years coaching high school basketball in New York and New Jersey and reviving a master's degree from the City College of New York, Frazier launched his college career as an assistant for Delaware State. He then joined the Illinois staff as an assistant in 1967, at a time when few African-American coaches could be found on Big Ten coaching staffs.

In 1971, Frazier was named head coach at Morgan State. One of his first recruits was seven-footer Marvin Webster, nicknamed “the Human Eraser” due to his shot-blocking prowess. In Webster's junior season of 1973–74, the Bears advanced to the NCAA Division II Final, where they defeated Southwest Missouri State 67–52 to win the school's first national championship. He was named the college division national coach of the year by the Associated Press.

Frazier left the Bears in 1977 to join Willis Reed's coaching staff on the New York Knicks of the National Basketball Association (NBA) for the 1977–78 season. He then went on to serve as president and head coach of the Washington Metros of the short-lived Women's Professional Basketball League (WBL). Frazier returned to college coaching as head coach at Bowie State from 1980 to 1982. In 1984, he was hired as the head coach of Virginia Wave of the newly founded Women's American Basketball Association. In 1985, he returned as head coach of Morgan State (now a Division I program) and served in that role for four seasons.

Frazier died on September 22, 2019, in Columbia, Maryland, at age 84.
