= Mom's Got Game =

Television series

- Genre: Reality
- Starring: Pamela McGee; JaVale McGee
- Country of origin: United States
- Original language: English
- No. of seasons: 1
- No. of episodes: 6

Production
- Executive producers: Pete Tartaglia; Amy Palmer Robertson
- Running time: 42 minutes
- Production companies: Richard Devinki Productions; Pierre Entertainment; Sony Pictures Television

Original release
- Network: Oprah Winfrey Network
- Release: January 18 – February 22, 2014

Mom's Got Game is an American reality television that debuted January 18, 2014, on the Oprah Winfrey Network.

== Premise ==
Mom's Got Game chronicles the lives of former WNBA basketball star Pamela McGee and her son, NBA player, JaVale McGee. The series also encompasses Pam as she manages her son's career, while also building her own brand.

== Episodes ==
No.	Title	Original release date	US viewers (millions)
1	"Fifty, Fabulous & Fierce"	January 18, 2014	0.71
2	"Successful, Sexy Singles"	January 25, 2014	N/A
3	"No Shame in My Game"	February 1, 2014	N/A
4	"Kitty Kitty Free Time"	February 8, 2014	N/A
5	"Don't Tell Pam"	February 15, 2014	N/A
6	"Amazonian Discombobulation"	February 22, 2014	N/A
