= Women's American Basketball Association (1984) =

One-season women's basketball league

- Sport: Women's basketball
- Founded: 1984; 42 years ago
- First season: 1984
- Folded: December 1984
- President: Bill Byrne
- Country: United States
- Last champion: Dallas Diamonds (1984)
- Broadcaster: Satellite Program Network

The Women's American Basketball Association (WABA) was a women's basketball league founded in 1984 by Bill Byrne that included players such as Nancy Lieberman, Molly Bolin, Pam McGee and Paula McGee. Lieberman, who signed a three-year, $250,000 contract with the Dallas Diamonds, was voted the league's Most Valuable Player after averaging 27 points per game and helping Dallas win the 1984 WABA championship, but the league folded after the season. The final game played was between the Diamonds and the WABA All-Stars, where Lieberman scored 19 points and was named the game's MVP in the Diamonds' 101–94 victory.

== Teams ==
Team	Arena	Head coach
Atlanta Comets	Cobb Arena	Robert Reese
Chicago Spirit	College of DuPage	Richard Maack / Vonnie Tomich
Columbus Minks	Ohio State Fairgrounds Coliseum	Larry Jones
Dallas Diamonds	Moody Coliseum	Greg Williams
Houston Shamrocks	University of St. Thomas	Elvin Hayes
Virginia Wave	Scoop Arena	Nat Frazier

- Elvin Hayes resigned after one game. Robert Reese was later replaced with Karen Brown, who became the first female head coach in the league.

== Standings ==
Pos	Team	Pld	W	L	PF	PA	PD	Pts
1	Dallas Diamonds	21	19	2	0	0	0	38
2	Columbus Minks	17	12	5	0	0	0	24
3	Atlanta Comets	13	7	6	0	0	0	14
4	Virginia Wave	14	5	9	0	0	0	10
5	Chicago Spirit	20	6	14	0	0	0	12
6	Houston Shamrocks	17	3	14	0	0	0	6

Updated to match(es) played on 15 October 2023. Source: The History of Women's Professional Basketball

== List of WABA championships ==
Year	Champion	Runner-up	Result	Host city	Game MVP	Ref
1984	Dallas Diamonds	Chicago Spirit			Nancy Lieberman	
