= Pamela McGee =

American basketball player (born 1962)

Personal information
- Born: December 1, 1962 (age 63) Flint, Michigan, U.S.
- Listed height: 6 ft 3 in (1.91 m)
- Listed weight: 170 lb (77 kg)

Career information
- High school: Flint Northern (Flint, Michigan)
- College: USC (1980–1984)
- WNBA draft: 1997: 1st round, 2nd overall pick
- Playing career: 1984–1998
- Position: Center / power forward
- Number: 30

Career history
- 1984: Dallas Diamonds
- 1997: Sacramento Monarchs
- 1998: Los Angeles Sparks

Career highlights
- 2× NCAA champion (1983, 1984); 2× Kodak All-American (1983, 1984); No. 30 retired by USC Trojans; WABA champion (1984)
- Stats at Basketball Reference
- Women's Basketball Hall of Fame
Medals
Representing the United States
Olympic Games
Gold medal – first place	1984 Los Angeles	Team
Pan American Games
Gold medal – first place	1983 Caracas	Team
FIBA World Championship for Women
Silver medal – second place	1983 Rio de Janeiro	Team
Jones Cup
Gold medal – first place	1984 Taipei	Team

Pamela Denise McGee (born December 1, 1962) is an American former professional women's basketball player, Olympic gold medalist, and Women's Basketball Hall of Fame inductee. She is the mother of NBA player JaVale McGee and WNBL player Imani McGee-Stafford.

== Early life ==
McGee grew up in Flint, Michigan, where she attended Flint Southwestern before graduating from Flint Northern High School. At Northern High School she was an Academic All-American and won two back-to-back state championships in women's basketball and women's track. She set the state record in the shotput in track and field. She was the MVP of the Parade All-American game, which hosted the top players in the nation.

McGee went on to win back-to-back NCAA Championships as an All-American at the University of Southern California, where she was a teammate of twin sister Paula, Cynthia Cooper and Cheryl Miller.

== USA Basketball ==
McGee was selected to be a member of the team representing the US at the 1983 Pan American Games held in Caracas, Venezuela. The team won all five games to earn the gold medal for the event. McGee averaged 3.4 points per game.

McGee played for the USA National team in the 1983 World Championships, held in Sao Paulo, Brazil. The team won six games, but lost two against the Soviet Union. In an opening round game, the USA team had a nine-point lead at halftime, but the Soviets came back to take the lead, and a final shot by the USA failed to drop, leaving the USSR team with a one-point victory 85–84. The USA team won their next four games, setting up the gold medal game against USSR. This game was also close, and was tied at 82 points each with six seconds to go in the game. The Soviets Elena Chausova received the inbounds pass and hit the game winning shot in the final seconds, giving the USSR team the gold medal with a score of 84–82. The USA team earned the silver medal. McGee averaged 4.2 points per game.

In 1984, the USA sent its national team to the 1984 William Jones Cup competition in Taipei, Taiwan, for pre-Olympic practice. The team easily beat each of the eight teams they played, winning by an average of just under 50 points per game. McGee averaged 6.5 points per game.

She continued with the national team to represent the US at the 1984 Olympics. The team won all six games to claim the gold medal. McGee averaged 6.2 points per game.

== Professional career ==
McGee started her professional career with the Dallas Diamonds in the Women's American Basketball Association where she played alongside her sister Paula. She later played in Brazil, Spain and Italy, and was a four-time Italian League All-Star. She won world championships at all three locations.

On April 28, 1997 McGee was the 2nd overall pick in the 1997 WNBA draft, being selected by the Sacramento Monarchs. Her debut game was played on June 21, 1997 in a 73-61 win over the Utah Starzz where she recorded 6 points, 3 rebounds, 1 assist and 1 steal. She would only play for the Monarchs during her rookie season, averaging 10.6 points and 4.4 rebounds, before being traded to the Los Angeles Sparks on April 9, 1998. In her first game with the Sparks on June 11, 1998, McGee would help defeat the same team she defeated in her first-ever WNBA game, the Utah Starzz. The Sparks defeated the Starzz 89-83 with McGee recording 4 points, 3 rebounds, 1 assist and 1 steal.

McGee played her entire second season in the WNBA with the Sparks, averaging 6.8 points and 4.8 rebounds. This would be her final season in the WNBA; it concluded on August 19, 1998, in a 71-80 defeat of the Sparks by the Houston Comets. McGee scored two points and grabbed one rebound.

For her accomplishments at the collegiate, professional, and Olympic levels, McGee was inducted into the 2012 class of the Women's Basketball Hall of Fame.

== Career statistics ==
=== College ===
Legend
GP	Games played	GS	Games started	MPG	Minutes per game
FG%	Field goal percentage	3P%	3-point field goal percentage	FT%	Free throw percentage
RPG	Rebounds per game	APG	Assists per game	SPG	Steals per game
BPG	Blocks per game	PPG	Points per game	**Bold**	Career high

Year	Team	GP	Points	FG%	FT%	RPG	APG	PPG
1980-81	USC	**34**	509	54.5%	50.6%	8.6	1.0	15.0
1981-82	USC	27	529	57.5%	**63.6%**	**11.6**	**1.6**	**19.6**
1982-83	USC	33	**608**	**61.0%**	63.2%	10.0	1.3	18.4
1983-84	USC	33	568	59.5%	51.9%	9.7	0.9	17.2
Career		127	2214	58.1%	61.5%	9.9	1.2	17.4

=== WNBA ===
Legend
GP	Games played	GS	Games started	MPG	Minutes per game	RPG	Rebounds per game
APG	Assists per game	SPG	Steals per game	BPG	Blocks per game	PPG	Points per game
TO	Turnovers per game	FG%	Field-goal percentage	3P%	3-point field-goal percentage	FT%	Free-throw percentage
**Bold**	Career best	°	League leader

Year	Team	GP	GS	MPG	FG%	3P%	FT%	RPG	APG	SPG	BPG	TO	PPG
1997	Sacramento	27	**23**	**25.6**	**.459**	**.286**	**.705**	4.4	**0.7**	**1.0**	0.5	2.7	**10.6**
1998	Los Angeles	**30**	22	19.0	.437	.000	.614	**4.8**	0.4	0.8	**0.8**	**1.8**	6.8
Career	2 years, 2 teams	57	45	22.1	.449	.182	.670	4.6	0.6	0.9	0.7	2.2	8.6

== Personal life ==
McGee lives in Annandale, Virginia. She has a daughter, former WNBA player Imani McGee-Stafford, who currently plays for the Perth Lynx of the Australian WNBL; and a son, NBA player and NBA champion JaVale McGee,. McGee is the first WNBA player to have a child play in the NBA and WNBA.

JaVale McGee is the first son of a WNBA player to ever play in the NBA. Pamela and JaVale both played professionally for Dallas, Los Angeles and Sacramento franchises; both also won Olympic gold medals playing for the United States. Javale's father, "Big" George Montgomery, played basketball at the University of Illinois in the early 1980s. In 1985, he was a second-round pick of the Portland Trail Blazers, but he never played in the NBA.

McGee earned a degree in economics while playing basketball at USC. She balanced her international basketball career with raising both children, home schooling, coaching, and teaching school in the off season.

In 2014, McGee and JaVale starred in their own reality television miniseries, Mom's Got Game.

In 2021, JaVale won an Olympic gold medal for USA Basketball, making them the first mother-and-son duo to win Olympic gold.
