= George Montgomery (basketball) =

American basketball player

Personal information
- Born: April 26, 1962 (age 63) Chicago, Illinois, U.S.
- Listed height: 6 ft 10 in (2.08 m)
- Listed weight: 235 lb (107 kg)

Career information
- High school: Corliss (Chicago, Illinois)
- College: Illinois (1981–1985)
- NBA draft: 1985: 2nd round, 39th overall pick
- Drafted by: Portland Trail Blazers
- Playing career: 1985–1996
- Position: Power forward

Career history
- 1985–1986: La Crosse Catbirds
- 1986–1987: Paris Basket Racing
- 1987–1988: BC Andorra
- 1988–1991: ABC Nantes
- 1991–1993: BCM Gravelines
- 1993–1994: Olympique Antibes
- 1994–1995: Olimpia Venado Tuerto
- 1995–1996: CSP Limoges
- Stats at Basketball Reference

George Montgomery (born April 26, 1962) is an American former professional basketball player. He played basketball at Illinois, and was a second-round draft selection of the Portland Trail Blazers in the 1985 NBA draft, though he never played in the NBA. He is the biological father of Beijing Ducks center JaVale McGee.
