= Jessie Maple =

American cinematographer (1937–2023)

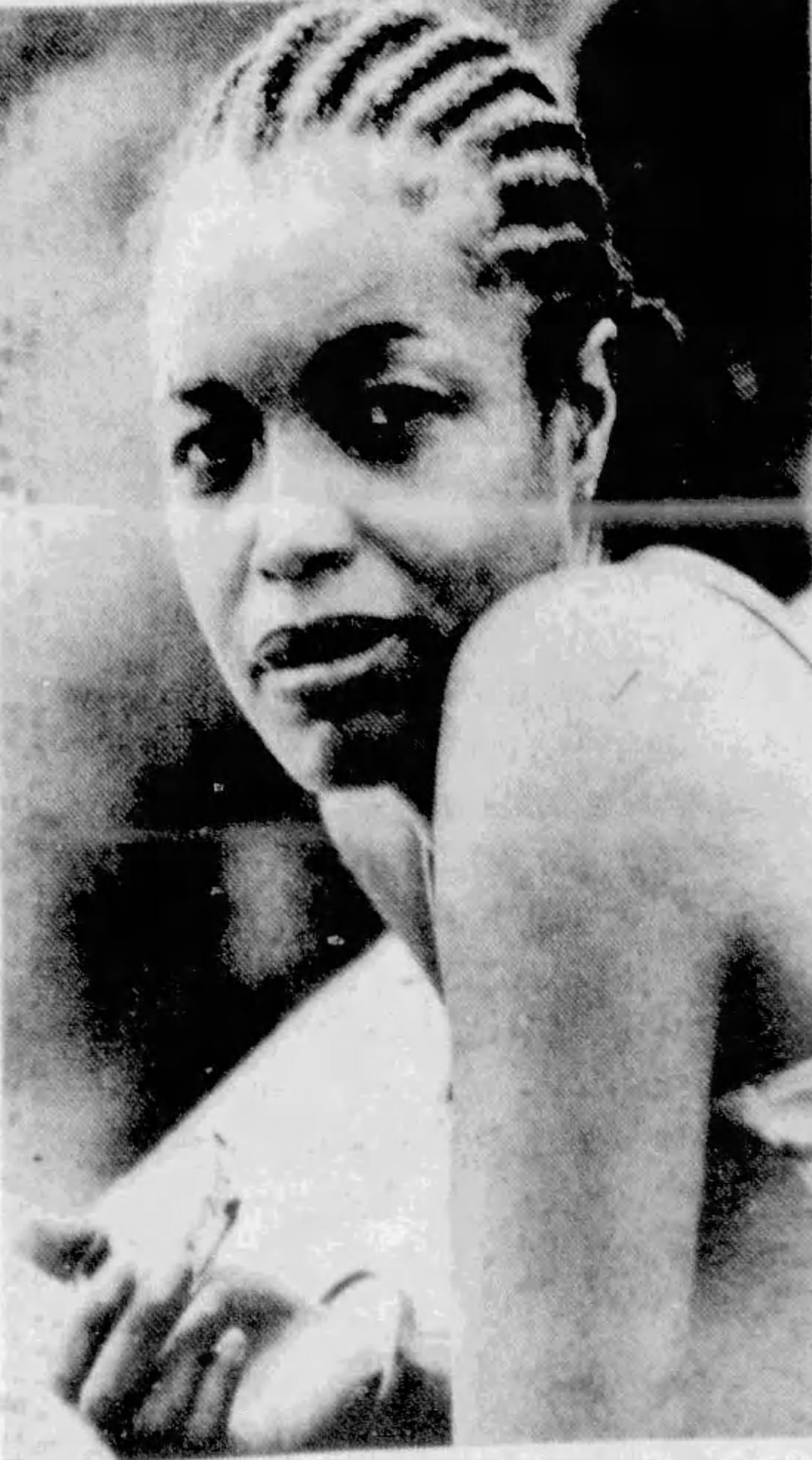
- Maple c. 1977
- Born: Jessie Maple; 14 February 1937; McComb, Mississippi
- Died: 30 May 2023 (aged 86); Atlanta, Georgia
- Occupations: Film director, Cinematographer
- Years active: 1971–1992

Jessie Maple (February 14, 1937 – May 30, 2023) (Note: Some sources cite 1947 as her year of birth and 76 as her age at death but Variety gives Maple's age at death as 86.) was an American cinematographer and film director most noted as a pioneer for the civil rights of African Americans and women in the film industry. Her 1981 film Will was among the first feature-length dramatic films created by an African American woman.

== Early life and education ==
According to an obituary in The Washington Post, Maple was born on February 14, 1937, in McComb, Mississippi, (Note: According to Ebony magazine, Maple was a native of Louisiana.) one of eleven siblings (4 brothers and 7 sisters). Maple's father worked as a farmer and died when she was 13; her mother worked as a dietician and schoolteacher. Now in Philadelphia, Maple was a student at the Franklin School of Science and Arts, where she studied medical technology.

In the 1960s and 1970s, Maple was head of a bacteriology and serology laboratory in Philadelphia and New York. She later wrote for the New York Courier. She received film training through Ossie Davis's Third World Cinema, and through the National Education Television Training School, a program run by WNET public television in New York City.

The latter program was established for African Americans to learn behind-the-scenes camera jobs in order to get into the union, but funding for this program was short-lived; as Maple noted, "It was so successful that after one year they shut it down." She began her career in film as an apprentice editor for Shaft's Big Score! and The Super Cops. After being admitted to the Film Editor's Union, Maple studied and passed the examination for the Cinematographer's Union.

== Career ==
Following a prolonged legal struggle in 1973, Maple became the first African American woman admitted to the New York camera operators union. She described her lawsuits and struggle in a self-published autobiographical book, How to Become a Union Camerawoman (1976). In a 2020 interview, she said, "After I passed the test and got into the cameraman's union, then they told the studios not to hire me and blacklisted me. I decided, well, I'm going to fight this....I decided, let me get this out the way, I sued them all at once, ABC, CBS, NBC, and I won."

Working for many years as a news camerawoman, Maple recounts she had her best moment when she realized she could "edit the story in the camera and prevent the editor from taking a positive story and making a negative one out of it," particularly in stories with a race element where black people were often left out of the news story. According to Maple, "I would shoot [the story] in a way where they couldn't cut the black person out of [it]. They had to see both sides of what happened and what they had to say."

In 1974, Maple cofounded LJ Films Productions with her husband, Leroy Patton, to produce short documentaries.

In 1981, Maple released the independent feature film Will, a gritty drama about a recovering heroin addict who befriends and attempts to mentor a streetwise kid. With that release, Maple has been cited as the first African American woman to direct an independent feature-length film in the post-civil rights era. In order to show her own film, and other independent movies by African Americans, Maple and Patton opened the 20 West Theater, Home of Black Cinema in their Harlem brownstone home in 1982. Her second independent feature film was Twice as Nice from a screenplay by poet and actress Saundra Pearl Sharp. Released in 1989, the film is a tale of twin sisters who play basketball.

The Black Film Center & Archive at Indiana University holds the papers and films of Maple in the Jessie Maple Collection, 1971–1992.

== Death ==
Jessie Maple Patton died in Atlanta on May 30, 2023. She was survived by her husband, her daughter, a grandson, five sisters, two adopted daughters, and several nieces and nephews.

== Selected filmography ==
=== Features ===
- Will (1981)
- Twice as Nice (1989)

=== Documentaries ===
- Methadone: Wonder Drug or Evil Spirit (1976)
- Black Economic Power: Reality or Fantasy (1977)

== Books ==
- How to Become a Union Camerawoman: Film-Videotape, New York, L. J. Film Productions, 1977
- Maple, Jessie; Butler, Danielle E. (2019). The Maple Crew: A Memoir. Jessie Maple. ISBN 9780578502021.
