= Leones de Ponce =

Leones de Ponce refers to several related club sports teams in Ponce, Puerto Rico, including:

- Leones de Ponce (baseball), a baseball team in the LBPRC
- Leones de Ponce (basketball), a basketball team in the BSN
- Leones de Ponce (volleyball), a volleyball team in the LVSM
- Leonas de Ponce, a female volleyball team in the LVSF
