= Paula McGee =

American preacher, writer and basketball player

Personal information
- Born: December 1, 1962 (age 63) Flint, Michigan, U.S.
- Listed height: 6 ft 3 in (1.91 m)

Career information
- High school: Flint Northern (Flint, Michigan)
- College: USC (1980–1984)
- Playing career: 1984–1992
- Position: Forward
- Number: 11

Career history
- 1984: Dallas Diamonds

Career highlights
- WABA champion (1984); 2× NCAA champion (1983, 1984); 4× All-WCAA First Team (1981–1984); No. 11 retired by USC Trojans
Medals
Women's basketball
Representing the United States
Jones Cup
Silver medal – second place	1982 Taipei	Team competition

Paula McGee (born December 1, 1962) is an American preacher, writer, inspirational speaker and former basketball player. She played college basketball for the University of Southern California where she won the NCAA championship in 1983 and 1984. Paula is the twin sister of former WNBA player and Olympic gold medalist Pamela McGee.

== College career ==
McGee joined USC in 1980 and averaged 20.0 points and 9.0 rebounds per game as a freshman. She was a 1982 WBCA All-American, 1983 Kodak All-American, 1983 and 1984 NCAA Final Four All-Tournament Team and a four-time WCAA First Team All-Conference.

== Professional career ==
McGee started her professional career in 1984, when she and her sister played together for the Dallas Diamonds in the Women's American Basketball Association. She went on to play professionally until 1992.
