= Drugs in the United States =

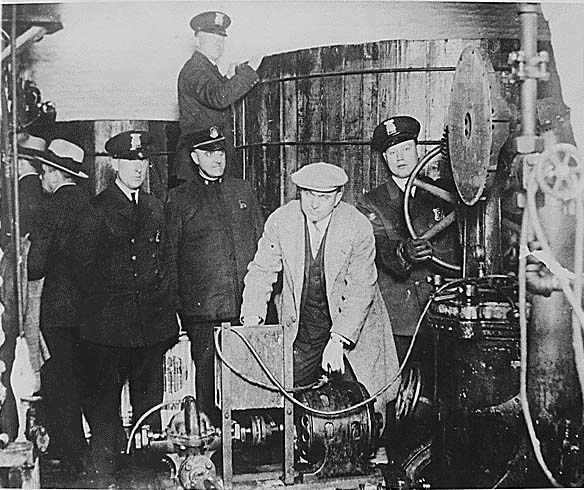
Michigan and Detroit police inspecting equipment found in a clandestine brewery during the Prohibition era

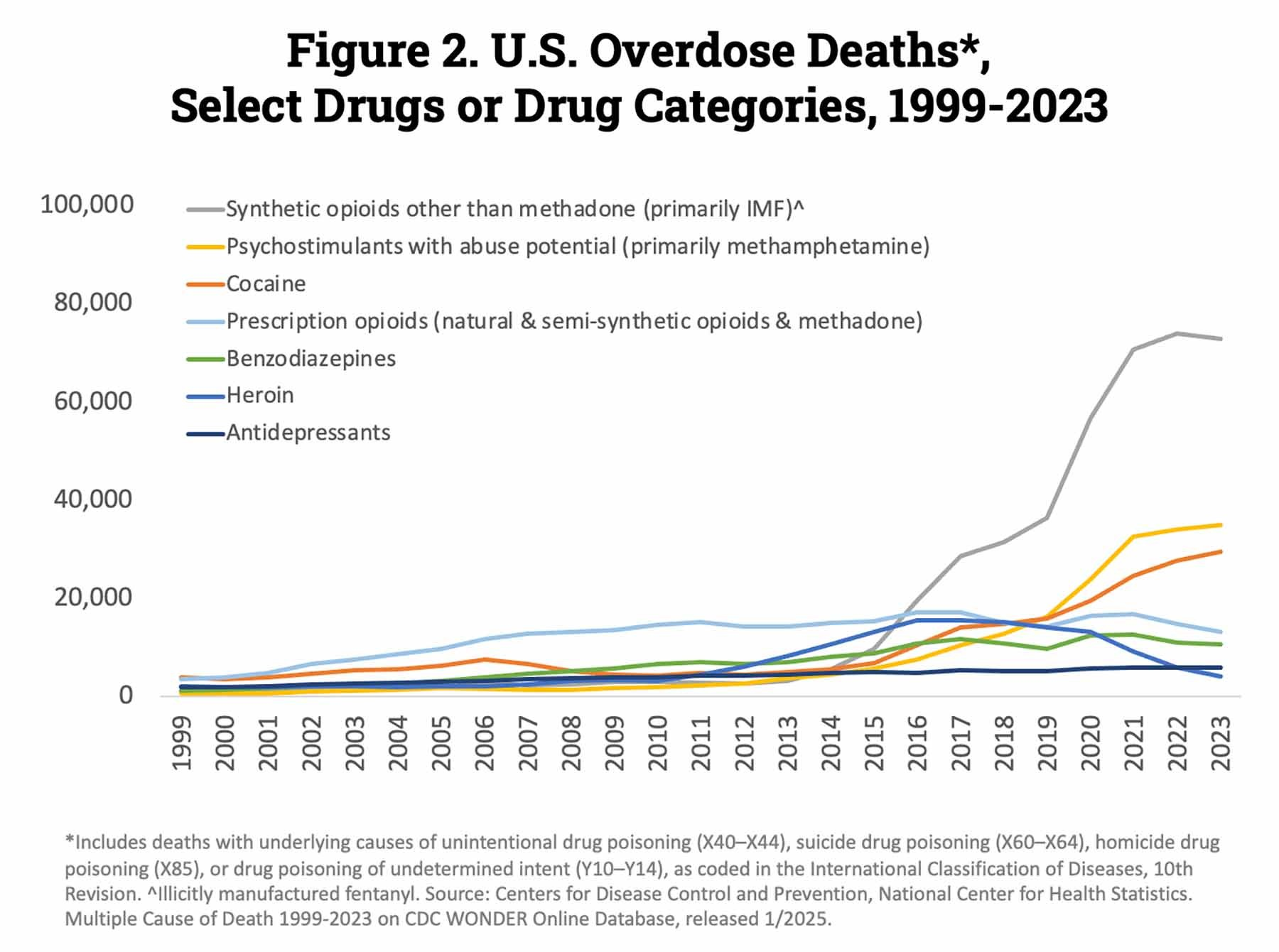
US yearly overdose deaths, and the drugs involved. Among the more than 70,200 deaths estimated in 2017, the sharpest increase occurred among deaths related to fentanyl and synthetic opioids (28,466 deaths).

The United States is a leading consumer of both legal and illegal drugs. With about 4% of world population, the US accounts for an estimated 8% of prescription drug use, is the largest market for over-the-counter remedies, and consumes more illegal street drugs than any other country. Due to extraordinarily high US prescription drug prices, the nearly $800 billion in annual sales represents nearly half of the global $1.7 trillion market, while overall usage is roughly on par with other high-income nations.

The Federal Food, Drug, and Cosmetic Act (FD&C) defines the word "drug" as an "article intended for use in the diagnosis, cure, mitigation, treatment, or prevention of disease in man or other animals" and those "(other than food) intended to affect the structure or any function of the body of man or other animals." Under the FD&C and the Controlled Substances Act, the Food and Drug Administration (FDA) and Drug Enforcement Administration (DEA) jointly manage drug regulation, while tobacco, caffeine, and alcohol are governed under separate rules.

== History ==
Drugs in the US were largely unregulated until the early 20th century. Opium had been used to relieve pain since the Revolutionary War (1775–1783), particularly in the treatment of soldiers during wartime. In the 1800s, the international opium trade was large-scale enterprise: Britain, and to a lesser degree the other European colonial powers and the US, gained immense profits from selling opium in China and southeast Asia; two opium wars were fought mid-century by Britain and allies against China to ensure the trade continued to serve millions of Chinese opium users. In America, the use of opiates in the civilian population began to increase dramatically, and cocaine use became prevalent. Alcohol consumption steadily grew, as did the temperance movement, well-supported by the middle class, promoting moderation or abstinence. The practice of smoking cannabis began to be noticed in the early 1900s. State and local governments began enacting drug laws in the mid-1800s. Under the US Constitution, the authority to control dangerous drugs exists separately at both the federal and state level. Federal drug legislation arrived after the turn of the century.

=== 1800s ===
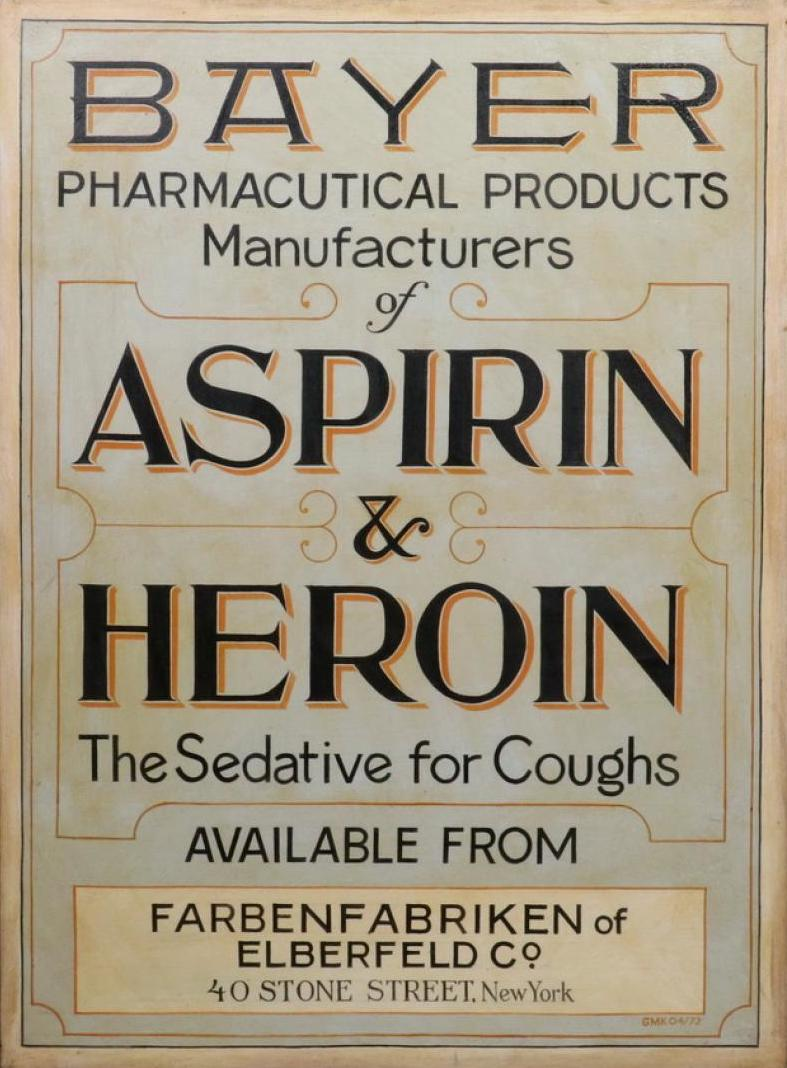
Advertising sign from Bayer for use in US drug stores, dating from before the federal prohibition of heroin by the Anti-Heroin Act of 1924.

The latter half of the 19th century saw a ramping up of opiate use in America. Early in the century, morphine had been isolated from opium, decades later, heroin was created from morphine, each more potent than the previous form. With the invention of the hypodermic syringe, introduced in America mid-century, opiates were easily administered and became a preferred medical treatment. During the Civil War (1861–1865), millions of doses of opiates were distributed to sick and wounded soldiers, addicting some; domestic poppy fields were planted in an attempt to meet shortages (the crops proved to be of poor quality). In the civilian population, physicians treated opiates like a wonder drug, prescribing them widely, for chronic pain, irritable babies, asthma, bronchitis, insomnia, "nervous conditions", hysteria, menstrual cramps, morning sickness, gastrointestinal disease, "vapors", and on.

Drugs were also sold over-the-counter as home remedies, and in refreshments. Laudanum, a powdered opium solution, was commonly found in the home medicine cabinet. Heroin was available as a cough syrup. Cocaine was introduced as a surgical anesthetic, and more popularly as a pick-me-up, found in soft drinks, cigarettes, blended with wine, in snuff, and other forms. Brand names appeared: Coca-Cola contained cocaine until 1903; Bayer created the trademark name "Heroin" for their diamorphine product. In the 1890s, the Sears & Roebuck catalog, distributed to millions of American homes, offered a syringe and a small amount of heroin for $1.50.

=== 20th century ===
During the 20th century, the US developed a strongly prohibitionist official stance against drugs that were deemed harmful. For decades previous, alcohol consumption had steadily increased, along with a growing temperance movement that was well-supported by the middle class. Promotion of moderation or abstinence eventually led to, in 1919, the 18th Amendment to the Constitution and the National Prohibition Act, ushering in over a decade of the national alcohol ban known as Prohibition. The policy failed as alcohol consumption grew and a black market flourished. It was repealed in 1933 with the passage of the 21st Amendment, and President Franklin D. Roosevelt asking Americans not to abuse "this return to personal freedom."

The distinction between freely available over-the-counter medications and prescription drugs was advanced in with the Federal Food, Drug, and Cosmetic Act of 1938, which required that non-narcotic drugs be labeled for safe use. The FDA determined from the act that certain drugs, including amphetamines, commercialized in the later 1930s, and barbiturates, were unsafe to use without medical supervision and could only be obtained by doctor's prescription. This was made law in the Durham–Humphrey Amendment of 1951.

== Policy and law ==
The US Constitution gives separate power to the federal government and to the individual states over the criminalization of drugs. The Constitution's Supremacy Clause guarantees that federal legislation always takes precedence over conflicting state laws. In practice, this can lead to murky situations. Cannabis is a stark example, where the majority of states have made the drug legal to varying degrees, while it remains prohibited at the federal level. Complicating matters, federal laws also accommodate international treaty obligations—the international drug treaties to which the US is a signatory designate cannabis as a controlled substance.

State and local governments began enacting drug laws in the mid-1800s. Until the turn of century, the federal government had stayed clear of drug legislation, seeing it as a "policing power" issue that was the purview of the individual states. This situation changed in part due to international commitments, where it was seen that the US needed its own drug laws. On February 9, 1909, the Smoking Opium Exclusion Act, "to prohibit the importation and use of opium for other than medicinal purposes", became the first US federal law to ban the non-medical use of a drug.

=== FDA and DEA – the agencies in charge ===
At the federal level, drugs administration is handled by two principal agencies, the Food and Drug Administration (FDA) and the Drug Enforcement Administration (DEA). The Federal Food, Drug, and Cosmetic Act, enacted in 1938 with numerous amendments since, is the core legislation, requiring the FDA to render scientific judgement on composition, safety and medical use if any of all drugs. Under the original act, the FDA determined that certain drugs, including amphetamines, commercialized in the later 1930s, and barbiturates, were unsafe to use without medical supervision and could only be obtained by doctor's prescription. This marked the beginning of the federal distinction between over-the-counter and prescription drugs (made law in the Durham–Humphrey Amendment of 1951). The DEA is charged with enforcing US controlled substances laws and regulations nationally and internationally, coordinating with federal, state and local agencies and foreign governments, and overseeing legally produced controlled substances.

=== War on drugs ===
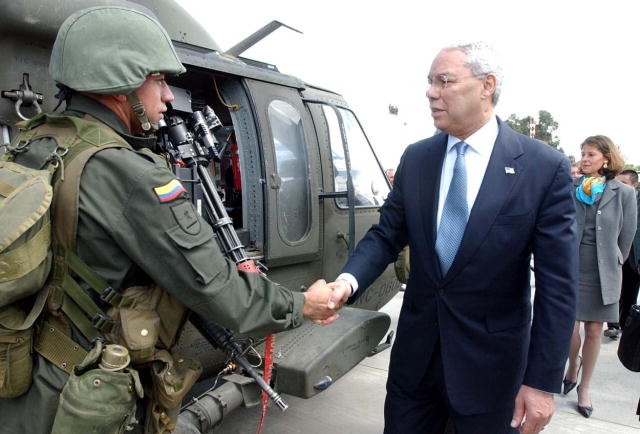
As part of the "War on drugs", the U.S. gives hundreds of millions of dollars per year of military aid to Colombia, used to combat guerrilla groups such as FARC, involved in narcotics trafficking. Colin Powell is seen here visiting Colombia in 2006 in support of Plan Colombia.

The war on drugs is a campaign of prohibition and foreign military aid and military intervention undertaken by the United States government, with the assistance of participating countries, and the stated aim to define and reduce the illegal drug trade. This initiative includes a set of drug policies of the United States that are intended to discourage the production, distribution, and consumption of illegal psychoactive drugs. The term "war on drugs" was first adopted by the news media reporting on President Richard Nixon's announced drug initiative in 1971.

=== Decriminalization ===
The use, sale, and possession of cannabis containing over 0.3% THC by dry weight in the United States, despite laws in many states permitting it under various circumstances, is illegal under federal law. As a Schedule I drug under the federal Controlled Substances Act (CSA) of 1970, cannabis containing over 0.3% THC by dry weight (legal term marijuana) is considered to have "no accepted medical use" and a high potential for abuse and physical or psychological dependence.

- Legality of cannabis by U.S. jurisdiction
- Legalization of non-medical cannabis in the United States
- Legal history of cannabis in the United States
- Medical cannabis in the United States
- Removal of cannabis from Schedule I of the Controlled Substances Act

In 2020, the state of Oregon became the first U.S. state to decriminalize cocaine. This new law prevents people with small amounts of cocaine from facing jail time. In 2020, the U.S. state of Oregon would also become the first state to decriminalize the use of heroin. This measure will allow people with small amounts to avoid arrest.

In January 2019, the Oregon Psilocybin Society and research firm DHM Research found that 47 percent of Oregon voters supported the legalization of medical psilocybin, while 46 percent opposed it. The percentage of voters in favor increased to 64 percent after key elements of the ballot were clarified to the poll's participants.

An October 2019 online poll conducted by research firm Green Horizons found that 38 percent of U.S. adults supported legalizing psilocybin "under at least some circumstances."

In November 2020, a ballot measure to legalize medical psilocybin passed with 55.8% of voters in favor.

== Medical drugs ==
Americans have a wide selection of medications to choose from, targeting ailments across the body’s organ systems. There are over 23,000 prescription drug products approved for the US market, and an estimated 100,000 over-the-counter drug products marketed under FDA's OTC monograph process. These drugs are formulated from a smaller number of active ingredients: the DrugCentral database lists approximately 2,300 active ingredients among FDA-approved drugs for human use; the FDA's OTC monographs cover approximately 800 active ingredients.

A 2026 survey of US adults found that 62% had used drugs for medical intervention in the previous seven days. In that group, the use of non-prescription over-the-counter drugs and prescription drugs was tied at 46%. Use increased with age among both males and females.

== Recreational drugs ==
Recreational drug use of one type or another is prevalent in the US, while recreational drugs are sharply divided by their legal status.

* Legal status for recreational use.Recreational drugs in the United States
Category	Common forms	Non-medical use*	In American life
Caffeine	Coffee, tea, soda, energy drinks	Legal	Three out of four Americans say they need caffeine to get them through the morning; half need it for the afternoon as well. Coffee is most popular (57%), also tea (24%) and energy drinks (33%).
Alcohol	Beer, wine, liquor	Legal (age-restricted)	Americans were 60%-70% drinkers in the last half-century, now trending down towards 50% due to health concerns.
Nicotine	Tobacco (cigarettes, cigars, pipe, rolling, smokeless), electronic cigarettes (vaping), nicotine pouches	Legal (age-restricted)	Smoking at least once in the last week steadily declined from a peak of 45% in 1954 to 11% in 2024; considered very harmful. Now, vaping (7%) trails smoking (9%).
Cannabis	Cannabis (dried), hashish, concentrates, edibles	Federal-state conflict	
Opioids	Heroin, fentanyl, oxycodone, hydrocodone, morphine	Illegal	
Stimulants	Cocaine, methamphetamine, prescription amphetamines, khat	Illegal	Cocaine is the second most popular illegal recreational drug behind cannabis, and the US is the world's largest consumer of cocaine.
Depressants	Benzodiazepines (Xanax, Valium), barbiturates, GHB, Rohypnol	Illegal	
Hallucinogens	LSD, psilocybin mushrooms, mescaline (peyote), DMT, MDMA ("ecstasy"), ketamine, PCP	Illegal	
Inhalants	Solvents, aerosols, nitrous oxide, poppers	Legal	Household products are common among the many substances used, including glue, shoe polish, spray paints, gasoline, fabric protector, and felt-tipped markers; 1.1% of Americans (3.2 million) 12 and older used in 2024, particularly among 12-25-year-olds.
Designer drugs	Synthetic cannabinoids (K2/Spice), synthetic cathinones (bath salts), nitazenes		
Gray area	DXM, salvia, tianeptine		
See also: Alcohol in the United States, Cannabis in the United States, Cocaine in the United States, Methamphetamine in the United States, Smoking in the United States

Drug overdose death rates per 100,000 by state. US map

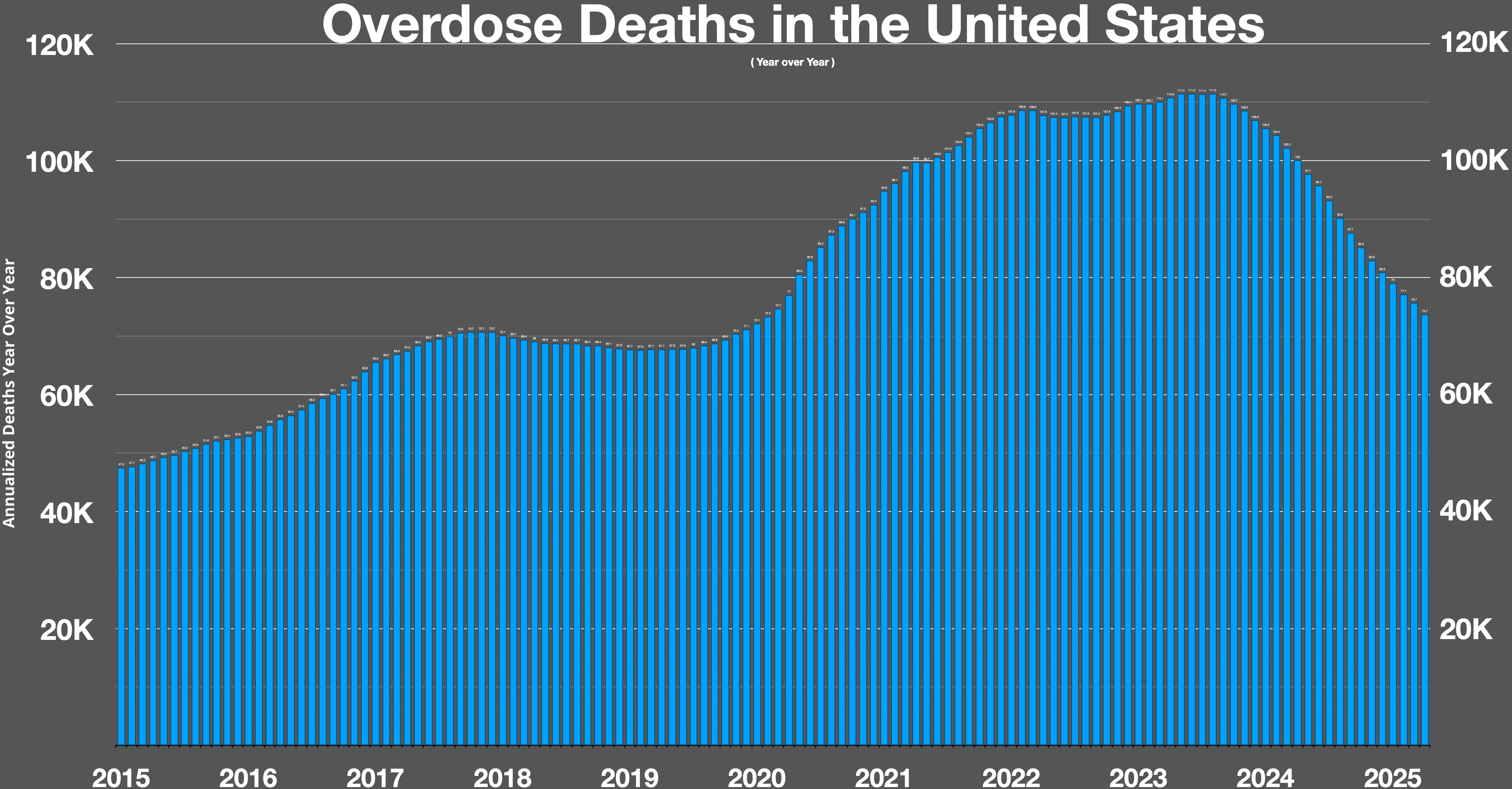
Overdose deaths in the United States 2015-2025

Overdose death rates in the United States by County

== Illicit drug activity ==
Illicit drug activity includes criminal activity involving illegal drug supply, and the use of drugs prohibited in certain situations, such as sports.

=== Drug trafficking ===
Drug smuggling across US borders may be done by several means. Packages may be carried by people, or by cars, trucks and Railcar, hidden in Compartment. Boats and submarines penetrate sea borders. Drones pass above and tunnels pass below the usual routes of smuggling.

=== Doping in sports ===
Doping is the taking of performance-enhancing drugs, generally for sporting activities. Doping has been detected in many sporting codes, especially baseball and football.

Substance	Athlete population	Percentage of athletes using substance
Any substance banned by WADA	Elite athletes across sports (positive drug tests)	2% over past year
Anabolic steroids	Professional football players (self-report)	9% used at some point in career
Opiates	Professional football players (self-report)	52% used at some point in career (71% of those misused at some point in career)
Smokeless tobacco	Professional basketball players (self-report)	35%–40% over past year
	Professional football players (self-report)	20%–30% over past year

==== Major League Baseball ====
===== The Mitchell Report =====
In December 2007 US Senator George Mitchell released Report to the Commissioner of Baseball of an Independent Investigation into the Illegal Use of Steroids and Other Performance Enhancing Substances by Players in Major League Baseball. Major League Baseball asked Mitchell to conduct an independent investigation to see how bad steroid use was in baseball. In the report, Mitchell covers many topics and he interviewed over 700 witnesses. He covers the effects of steroids on the human body. He also touches on human growth hormone effects. He reports on baseball's drug testing policies before 2002 and the newer policies after 2002. Mitchell also named 86 players in the report that had some kind of connection to steroids. Among those named were: Andy Pettitte, Roger Clemens, Barry Bonds, and Eric Gagne. To finish his report, Mitchell made suggestions to the Commissioner of Baseball about drug testing and violations of the drug testing policies. Mitchell also reported that he would provide evidence to support the allegations made against such players and would give them the opportunity to meet with him and give them a fair chance to defend themselves against the allegations. The report also includes a paper trail of evidence that states, "Former Mets club house attendant, Kirk Randomski sent performing enhancement drugs to the players mentioned in the report." Quinn, T.J. and Thompson, Teri Daily News Sports Writers [New York, N.Y.] CT. (2007):66

== Public health ==
Recent decades have seen a massive spike in opioid addiction and overdose death as a national crisis in the US, although from its peak in 2022, the annual opioid death rate has steadily and precipitously declined, reduced by nearly half by 2025, for reasons so far unclear.

California's adult smoking rate has dropped nearly 50% since the state began the nation's longest-running tobacco control program in 1988. California saved $86 billion in health care costs by spending $1.8 billion on tobacco control, a 50:1 return on investment over its first 15 years of funding its tobacco control program.

443,000 Americans die of smoking or exposure to secondhand smoke each year. For every smoking-related death, another 20 people suffer with a smoking-related disease. (2011)

According to data from October 2023 to September 2024, approximately 87,000 deaths due to drug overdoses were reported in the United States.

A significant concern for public health safety in the United States arises also from Mexico, where illicit opium poppy cultivation is on the rise. The Mexican government reported eradicating 21,425 hectares of opium poppy fields in 2014, up from 14,419 hectares in 2013. From 2010 to 2015, the number of heroin seizures along the U.S.-Mexico border more than doubled. According to the DEA, Mexican drug trafficking organizations are not only major suppliers of heroin but also the largest international sources of cocaine, marijuana, and methamphetamine that enter the United States.

==== Drug courts ====
The first Drug court in the United States took shape in Miami-Dade County, Florida in 1989 as a response to the growing crack-cocaine usage in the city. Chief Judge Gerald Wetherington, Judge Herbert Klein, then State Attorney Janet Reno and Public Defender Bennett Brummer designed the court for nonviolent offenders to receive treatment. This model of court system quickly became a popular method for dealing with an ever-increasing number of drug offenders. Between 1984 and 1999, the number of defendants charged with a drug offense in the Federal courts increased 3% annually, from 11,854 to 29,306. By 1999 there were 472 Drug Courts in the nation and by 2005 that number had increased to 1262 with another 575 Drug Courts in the planning stages; currently, all 50 states have working Drug Courts. There are currently about 120,000 people treated annually in Drug Courts, though an estimated 1.5 million eligible people are currently before the courts. There are currently more than 2,400 Drug Courts operating throughout the United States

=== Opioid crisis ===
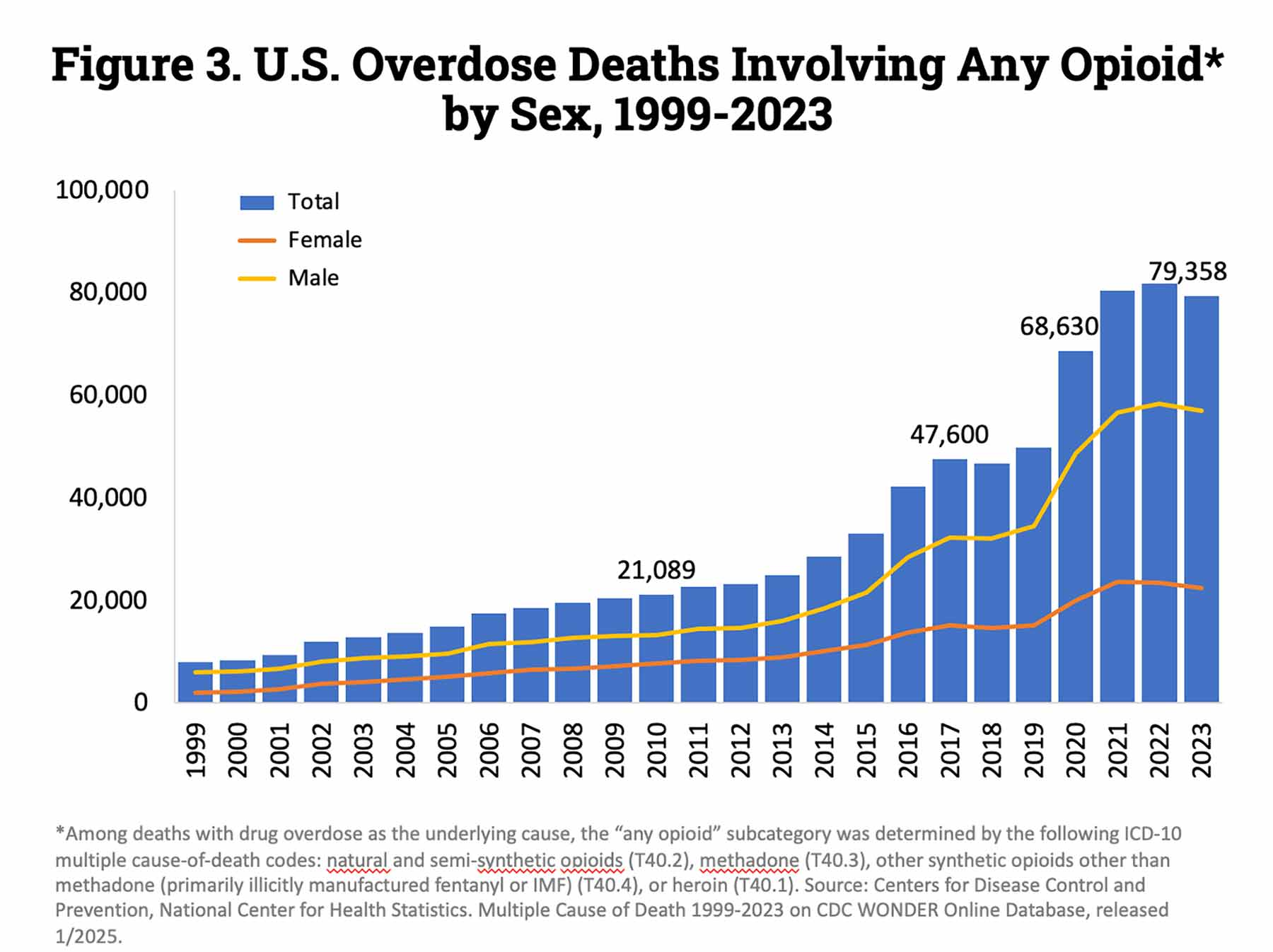
The number of yearly U.S. opioid overdose deaths from all opioid drugs.

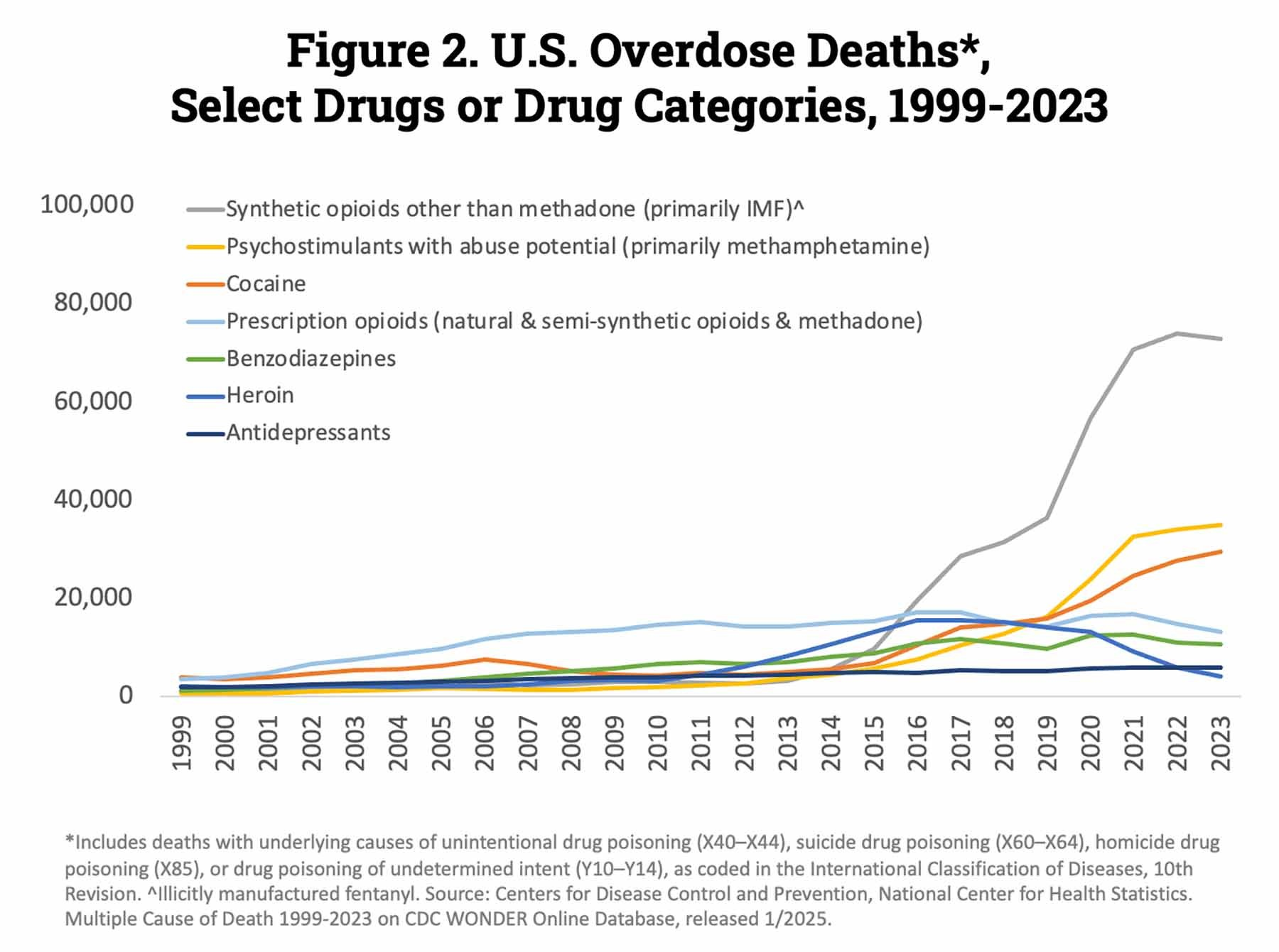
U.S. yearly overdose deaths, and the drugs involved. Among the 108,000 deaths in 2022, the largest share was related to fentanyl and other synthetic opioids (73,838 deaths).

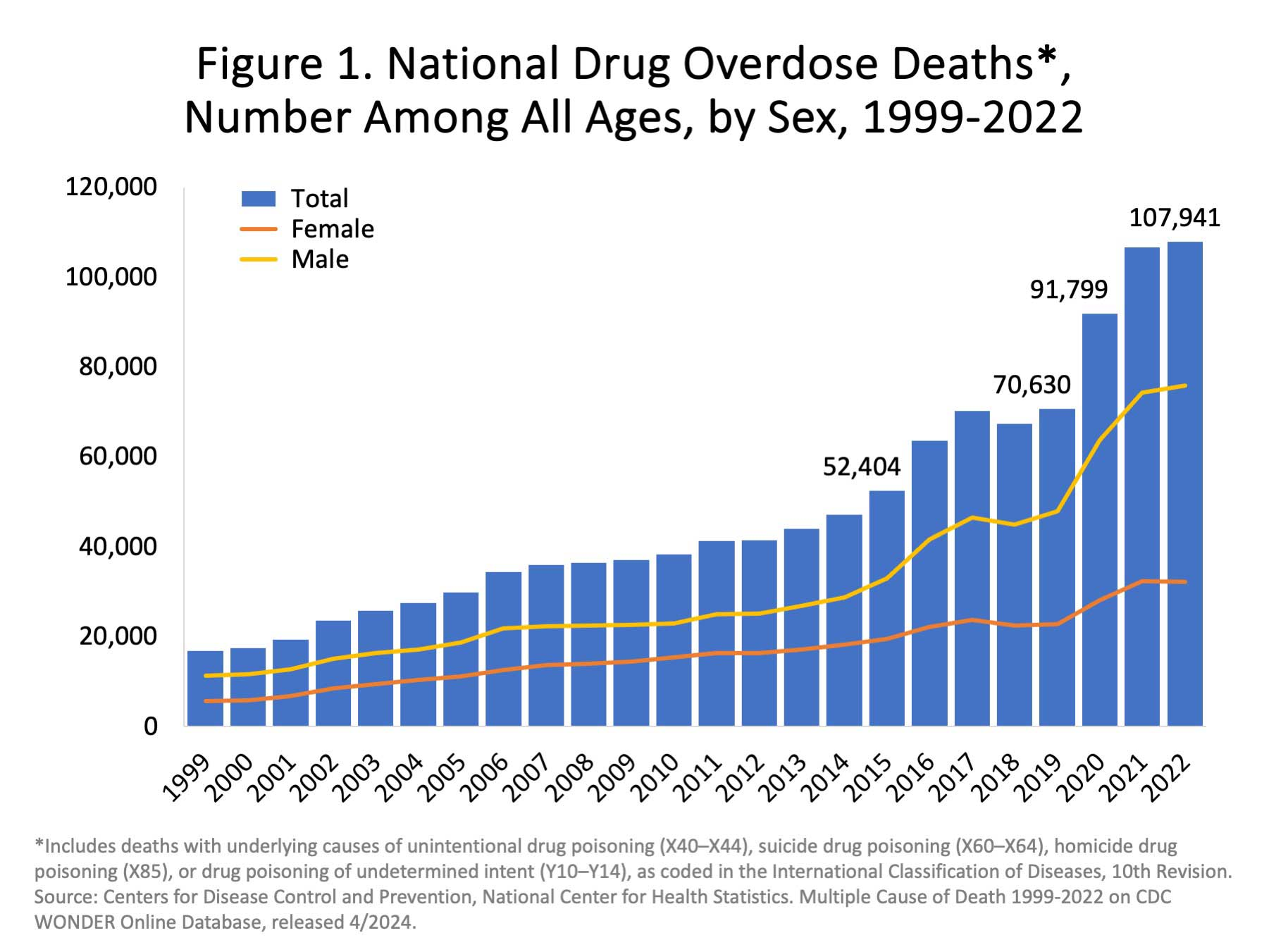
Total drug overdose deaths in the United States.

There is an ongoing opioid epidemic (also known as the opioid crisis) in the United States, originating out of both medical prescriptions and illegal sources. It has been described by doctors and researchers as "one of the most devastating public health catastrophes of our time". The opioid epidemic unfolded in three waves. The first wave of the epidemic in the United States began in the late 1990s, according to the Centers for Disease Control and Prevention (CDC), when opioids were increasingly prescribed for pain management, resulting in a rise in overall opioid use throughout subsequent years. The second wave was from an expansion in the heroin market to supply already addicted people. The third wave, starting in 2013, was marked by a steep tenfold increase in the synthetic opioid-involved death rate as synthetic opioids flooded the US market.

In the United States, there were approximately 109,600 drug-overdose-related deaths in the 12-month period ending January 31, 2023, at a rate of 300 deaths per day. From 1999 to 2020, nearly 841,000 people died from drug overdoses, with prescription and illicit opioids responsible for 500,000 of those deaths. Drug overdose deaths totaled 70,237 in 2017, with 47,600 involving an opioid. This surpassed deaths from car crashes (37,133) by 28%. A December 2017 report estimated that 130 people die every day in the United States due to opioid-related drug overdose. The great majority of Americans surveyed in 2015 who used prescription opioids did not believe that they were misusing them.

The problem is significantly worse in rural areas, where socioeconomic variables, health behaviors, and accessibility to healthcare are responsible for a higher death rate. Teen use of opioids has been noticeably increasing, with prescription drugs used more than any illicit drug except cannabis – more than cocaine, heroin, and methamphetamine combined.

Drug use and deaths per state (2010)
State	Population (2010)	Drug Users (2010)	Drug Deaths (Total 2010)	Drug Deaths (per 100,000)	Federal Grants (2010)	Grant/Drug User
Alabama	4,779,736	06.73%	554	12	$80,040,503	$248.82
Alaska	710,231	11.79%	75	11	$30,760,934	$367.36
Arizona	6,392,017	08.95%	981	15.5	$138,524,069	$242.36
Arkansas	2,915,918	07.96%	326	11.5	$47,138,163	$203.09
California	37,253,956	09.07%	4178	11.4	$832,107,905	$246.26
Colorado	5,029,196	11.72%	747	15.4	$111,188,470	$188.64
Connecticut	3,574,097	08.23%	444	12.7	$103,493,029	$351.84
Delaware	897,934	09.14%	102	11.8	$24,161,839	$294.40
Florida	18,801,310	07.80%	2936	16.1	$338,129,029	$230.57
Georgia (U.S. state)	9,687,653	07.32%	1043	10.6	$321,114,660	$452.83
Hawaii	1,360,301	09.92%	142	11.1	$37,176,146	$275.50
Idaho	1,567,582	08.00%	133	8.9	$21,076,027	$168.06
Illinois	12,830,632	07.17%	1239	9.6	$234,968,808	$255.41
Indiana	6,483,802	08.79%	827	13.0	$91,020,232	$159.71
Iowa	3,046,355	04.08%	211	7.1	$58,962,185	$474.39
Kansas	2,853,118	06.77%	294	10.6	$40,234,098	$208.30
Kentucky	4,339,367	08.41%	722	17	$100,547,625	$275.52
Louisiana	4,533,372	07.16%	862	20.1	$80,230,847	$247.18
Maine	1,328,361	09.09%	161	12.2	$36,320,286	$300.79
Maryland	5,773,552	07.29%	807	12.7	$192,136,722	$456.50
Massachusetts	6,547,629	08.87%	1003	15.6	$245,061,344	$421.96
Michigan	9,883,640	08.95%	1524	15.3	$243,556,706	$275.33
Minnesota	5,303,925	08.24%	359	6.9	$95,867,509	$219.35
Mississippi	2,967,297	06.39%	334	11.4	$50,554,343	$266.62
Missouri	5,988,927	07.38%	730	12.4	$123,020,244	$278.34
Montana	989,415	10.02%	132	13.8	$28,332,837	$285.79
Nebraska	1,826,341	06.43%	92	5.2	$34,675,170	$295.27
Nevada	2,700,551	09.35%	515	20.1	$46,367,799	$183.63
New Hampshire	1,316,470	12.15%	172	13.0	$55,388,743	$346.29
New Jersey	8,791,894	06.42%	797	9.2	$113,795,702	$201.61
New Mexico	2,059,179	10.07%	447	12.8	$150,896,974	$727.71
New York	19,378,102	09.82%	1797	9.2	$1,875,136,099	$985.39
North Carolina	9,535,483	08.88%	1223	13.0	$403,912,656	$477.01
North Dakota	672,591	05.3%	28	4.3	$36,344,108	$1,019.55
Ohio	11,536,504	07.61%	1691	14.7	$207,925,242	$236.84
Oklahoma	3,751,351	08.09%	687	19	$67,359,062	$221.95
Oregon	3,831,074	12.80%	564	15.1	$104,298,167	$212.69
Pennsylvania	12,702,379	06.57%	1812	14.6	$283,229,043	$339.38
Rhode Island	1,052,567	13.34%	142	13.4	$43,604,718	$310.55
South Carolina	4,625,364	06.70%	584	13.2	$77,790,340	$251.02
South Dakota	814,180	06.28%	34	4.3	$31,840,106	$622.72
Tennessee	6,346,105	08.22%	1035	16.8	$107,211,391	$205.52
Texas	25,145,561	06.26%	2343	9.8	$384,444,836	$244.23
Utah	2,763,885	06.24%	546	20.6	$47,059,651	$272.86
Vermont	625,741	13.73%	57	9.2	$58,913,913	$685.73
Virginia	8,001,024	07.33%	713	9.2	$173,221,243	$295.36
Washington	6,724,540	09.59%	1003	15.5	$130,527,165	$202.40
West Virginia	1,852,994	06.79%	405	22.4	$45,059,469	$358.13
Wisconsin	5,686,986	08.67%	639	11.4	$107,259,369	$217.54
Wyoming	563,626	06.82%	68	13	$12,483,581	$324.76
United States	308,143,815	08.11%	38260	12.4	$8,304,469,106	$332.19

== Economics ==
US consumers pay the highest brand-name prescription drug prices in the world, around four times more than in other countries. Unbranded generic drugs are substantially less expensive and make up a larger percentage of overall prescription sales than in other countries, 90% of volume compared to 41%.

US pharmaceutical sales approaching $800 billion accounted for nearly half of the $1.7 trillion global pharmaceutical market in 2024. This represents exorbitantly high prices compared to other countries; per capita pharmaceutical consumption is over $2000. With about 4% of the world population, actual prescription drug consumption is about 8% of the global supply, which is on par with several other high-income countries. Reliable figures for illegal recreational drug sales don't exist; the last credible set, released in 2016 by the RAND Corporation, estimates a US street drug market of about $150 billion, accounting for cocaine, heroin, cannabis, and methamphetamine.

== Society and culture ==
In US mainstream culture, recreational drugs, even legal ones, have generally been looked at with some measure of disapproval. There are no deeply embedded roles for intoxicating substances, as exist in some older cultures. Consequently, recreational drug use largely occurs in distinct drug subcultures.

The US is the world's leading consumer of illicit recreational drugs by a wide margin, leading in per capita consumption by around 75% more than its two nearest rivals, neighboring Canada and Australia. Across the major illicit drug categories, according to a 2026 report, the US ranks first for opioids at over double the per capita use of Canada, and in the top 4 for cannabis, cocaine, and amphetamines.

America became home to the first drug film with Chinese Opium Den, a 30-second black-and-white short produced in 1894 by Thomas Edison for commercial viewing in Kinetoscopes.

== See also ==
- Crime in the United States
- Drug prohibition
- Federal drug policy of the United States
- Harm reduction in the United States
- Illegal drug trade in the United States
- National Institute on Drug Abuse
- Opioid epidemic in the United States
- Women in the drug economy in the United States
