= Rosalie Garcia =

American drug dealer and gang leader

- Born: Rosalie Garcia; November 11, 1951 (age 74)
- Occupation: Drug dealer
- Years active: 1990s
- Known for: Leader of the Hoe Avenue Crew
- Status: Released
- Criminal charges: Murder, racketeering, drug trafficking
- Penalty: Life imprisonment (2005), later granted compassionate release (2025)

Rosalie Garcia (born November 11, 1951), also known as Shorty, is a former American drug dealer. She headed the Hoe Avenue Crew, the deadly heroin ring that was active in the Bronx in New York City during the 1990s.

Garcia was convicted in the 2005 trial, Garcia v. United States, alongside her son, Manuel Roman, and hitman Ricardo Silva. They were sentenced to life in prison on counts of murder, racketeering, and drug trafficking. A collateral review filing states that she was incarcerated in a federal correctional facility where she was serving life plus 25 years. Her story has been cited in discussions about women in organized crime and in the long-term social impact of the 1990s heroin epidemic in the Bronx. On April 3, 2025, Garcia was granted compassionate release. She was released on April 9, 2025.

== Criminal career ==
=== Hoe Avenue Crew ===
The Hoe Avenue Crew was a heroin ring run out of the Bronx in New York City, led by Rosalie Garcia and her son, Manuel Roman. Operations were run out of the apartment building she owned at 914 Hoe Avenue. At its peak from 1991 to 2002, Rosalie Garcia and the Hoe Avenue Crew were bringing in $700,000 per week in heroin sales from her drug "pitchers" selling 10$ heroin bags. Garica used her earnings to buy into legal businesses, such as a pool hall and dry cleaners.

According to federal court records, the crew-controlled heroin distribution territory around Hoe Avenue and nearby streets in South Bronx, with 914 Hoe Avenue used as a base for storing narcotics, collecting money, and coordinating workers. Witnesses testified that Garcia managed the financial side of the operation while her son, Roman, oversaw street-level sellers and enforced discipline.

=== 1994 murders ===
In February 1994, two individuals from a rival drug gang were murdered by the Hoe Avenue Crew in the lobby of 914 Hoe Avenue. The double murder ended a three-month-long gang war, as the murders were in retaliation for the rival gang killing Roman's best friend, Otero. While neither Garcia nor Roman killed the two rival members, they were eventually convicted of the double murders, as they were found to have hired a hitman to carry out the killings, with Garcia specifically being consulted about payments. It was entered into evidence later that Garcia had paid a Santeria priestess to identify the culprit of Otero's murder to kill him.

=== 1997 murders ===
In 1997, rival gang member Richard "Oreo" Rodriguez was beaten by Roman and then shot to death by Morges, a member of the Hoe Avenue Crew, who sought out Oreo at a pool hall. Prior to the murder, that same night, Garcia found Oreo stealing her crew's drugs and threatened to kill her if she were to be back out on the block. In response, Garcia told her son that Oreo must be killed and gave Roman and another crew member a bag containing two guns. Additionally, weeks before the murder, witnesses claimed that Garcia instructed her workers to call her if Oreo was on their block, then would subsequently notify Roman of Oreo's whereabouts, which he would attend to by going out to investigate with a gun. Although Garcia did not kill Oreo, she was eventually charged with murder and racketeering charges, as it was clear she intended to have Oreo killed. The second Circuit Court later confirmed this was charged as murder in aid of racketeering, based on evidence that Garcia ordered the killing and provided the weapons.

=== Rosalie v. State ===
Rosalie, along with Roman and Silva, was convicted on 12 counts in 2005 for her involvement in the 1994 and 1997 murders, racketeering, and drug trafficking.

==== Appeals ====
After being convicted in 2005, Garcia and her legal team submitted an appeal on the grounds that she was not competent to stand trial, insufficient evidence for racketeering and the 1994 and 1997 murder charges, criminal facilitation jury instruction, and the admission of hearsay evidence. However, the court found no grounds for the appeals. The judge ruled Garcia competent to stand trial and found that there was sufficient evidence for a jury to justify racketeering charges beyond a reasonable doubt.

== Media coverage ==
Garcia's 2005 federal trial drew significant attention in New York due to her role as a woman leading a large-scale heroin ring. Prosecutors described her as the "queenpin" of the Hoe Avenue Crew, overseeing the operation and approving violent acts to maintain control over the territory. Witnesses testified that Garcia managed sales in her apartment building and coordinated payments to enforcers.

Media coverage of the case highlighted Garcia's dual identity as both a mother of seven and the leader of a violent narcotics organization. Outlets such as the New York Daily News and New York Post emphasized how Garcia balanced family responsibilities while running an operation that brought in hundreds of dollars weekly. Her conviction, along with her son Manuel Roman and hitman Ricardo Silva, was seen as a major victory for federal authorities seeking to dismantle violent drug enterprises in the Bronx under the RICO Act.

Her nickname "Shorty" was frequently mentioned in news reports. Media coverage noted that her presence challenged expectations of women in organized crime.

Her story was featured on TV series Gangsters: America's Most Evil, in an episode titled “Lethal Beauties: Beltran, Henao and Garcia.”
