= American Gangster: Trap Queens =

2019 television documentary series

- Genre: Docuseries
- Narrated by: Jeezy (season 1); Lil' Kim (season 2–3); Da Brat (season 4)
- Country of origin: United States
- Original language: English
- No. of seasons: 4
- No. of episodes: 35

Production
- Executive producers: Arthur Smith; Frank Sinton; Greg Mathis; Delece James; Mark Anthony; Breht Gardner; Jackson Nguyen
- Production companies: A. Smith & Company Productions

Original release
- Network: BET+
- Release: October 17, 2019 – present

American Gangster: Trap Queens is an American docuseries that premiered on BET+ on October 17, 2019.

On January 8, 2021, the series was renewed for a second season which premiered on January 14, 2021.

On March 31, 2022, the series was renewed for a third season which premiered on April 7, 2022.

On June 24, 2025, the series was renewed for a fourth season which premiered on July 10, 2025.

== Episodes ==
Season	Episodes		Originally released
1	10	5	October 17, 2019
1	10	5	January 9, 2020
2	10	5	January 14, 2021
2	10	5	October 7, 2021
3	10	5	April 7, 2022
3	10	5	June 9, 2022
4	10	5	July 10, 2025
4	10	5	November 20, 2025

=== Season 1 (2019–20) ===
No. overall	No. in season	Title	Original release date	BET air date	U.S. linear viewers (millions)
1	1	"Jamila T. Davis"	October 17, 2019	April 7, 2021	0.35
2	2	"Delrhonda "Big 50" Hood"	October 17, 2019	April 21, 2021	0.27
3	3	"Thelma Wright"	October 17, 2019	April 28, 2021	0.28
4	4	"Rashia Wilson"	October 17, 2019	May 12, 2021	0.08
5	5	"Shauna Barry-Scott"	October 17, 2019	June 2, 2021	N/A
6	6	"Aisha Hall"	January 9, 2020	April 14, 2021	0.31
7	7	"Ayana Bean"	January 9, 2020	May 5, 2021	0.33
8	8	"Jean Brown"	January 9, 2020	May 19, 2021	0.28
9	9	"Charmaine Roman"	January 9, 2020	May 26, 2021	0.25
10	10	"Jemeker Thompson"	January 9, 2020	June 9, 2021	N/A

=== Season 2 (2021) ===
No. overall	No. in season	Title	Original release date	BET air date	U.S. linear viewers (millions)
11	1	"Perrion Roberts"	January 14, 2021	April 5, 2022	0.33
12	2	"Brandi Davis"	January 14, 2021	April 12, 2022	0.33
13	3	"Dwen Curry"	January 14, 2021	April 19, 2022	0.35
14	4	"Tiffani Rose Peak"	January 14, 2021	April 26, 2022	0.37
15	5	"Shauntay Henderson"	January 14, 2021	May 3, 2022	0.32
16	6	"Tonesa Welch"	October 7, 2021	May 10, 2022	0.31
17	7	"Peggy Fulford"	October 7, 2021	May 17, 2022	0.35
18	8	"Claudette Hubbard"	October 7, 2021	May 24, 2022	0.29
19	9	"Catherine Pugh"	October 7, 2021	May 31, 2022	0.31
20	10	"Priscilla Echi"	October 7, 2021	June 7, 2022	0.38

=== Season 3 (2022) ===
No. overall	No. in season	Title	Original release date	BET air date	U.S. linear viewers (millions)
21	1	"Kim Smedley"	April 7, 2022	August 1, 2023	N/A
22	2	"Candace Wilson"	April 7, 2022	August 22, 2023	N/A
23	3	"Gina Cabel"	April 7, 2022	August 1, 2023	N/A
24	4	"Shontel Greene"	April 7, 2022	August 8, 2023	N/A
25	5	"Tonia Taylor"	April 7, 2022	August 15, 2023	N/A
26	6	"Sydia Bagley"	June 9, 2022	August 29, 2023	0.23
27	7	"Lonett Williams"	June 9, 2022	September 19, 2023	N/A
28	8	"Pam Driskel"	June 9, 2022	September 26, 2023	N/A
29	9	"Tracie Dickey"	June 9, 2022	September 26, 2023	N/A
30	10	"Demi Harrison"	June 9, 2022	September 5, 2023	N/A

=== Season 4 (2025) ===
No. overall	No. in season	Title	Original release date	BET air date	U.S. linear viewers (millions)
31	1	"Felicia "Snoop" Pearson"	July 10, 2025	January 7, 2026	N/A
32	2	"Padge-Victoria "Black Madam" Windslowe"	July 10, 2025	January 14, 2026	N/A
33	3	"Angela "Shay" Wright"	July 10, 2025	January 21, 2026	N/A
34	4	"Sharita Mathis"	July 10, 2025	January 28, 2026	N/A
35	5	"Celeste Wells"	July 10, 2025	February 4, 2026	N/A
36	6	"Kristell Miles"	November 20, 2025	June 17, 2026	N/A
37	7	"Starr Austin"	November 20, 2025	June 24, 2026	N/A
38	8	"Veronica Henderson"	November 20, 2025	July 1, 2026	N/A
39	9	"Nelly Idowu"	November 20, 2025	July 8, 2026	N/A
40	10	"Regina Blackshear"	November 20, 2025	July 15, 2026	N/A
