= Mathis Family Matters =

- Also known as: Mathis Family Matters
- Genre: Reality Television
- Starring: Judge Greg Mathis; Linda Mathis; Jade Mathis; Camara Mathis; Greg Mathis Jr; Amir Mathis; Ryan Webb; Elliott Cooper
- Country of origin: United States
- Original language: English
- No. of seasons: 1
- No. of episodes: 10

Production
- Executive producers: Judge Greg Mathis; Amir Mathis; Charles Davis; Sarah Ebadi; Bridgette Theriault
- Producers: Richard Allan Kent; Kevin Burke
- Cinematography: Gabriel Delerme
- Camera setup: Multiple
- Running time: 26 minutes
- Production company: Shed Media

Original release
- Network: E! Entertainment
- Release: June 19 – August 14, 2022

Related
- Judge Mathis; Mathis Court with Judge Mathis '

Mathis Family Matters is an American reality television series that premiered on E! Entertainment on June 19, 2022. The series aired for one season and follows Judge Greg Mathis, Linda Mathis and their four adult children's lives.

== Premise ==
In April 2022, E! News announced Judge Greg Mathis, and his wife Linda Mathis, were set to star in a new docu-series, along with their four adult children - Jade Mathis, Camara Mathis, Greg Mathis Jr and Amir Mathis. The series follows the family as they navigate through life, love and Hollywood.

== Cast ==
=== Main Cast ===
- Judge Greg Mathis
- Linda Mathis
- Jade Mathis
- Camara Mathis
- Greg Mathis Jr
- Amir Mathis
- Ryan Webb
- Elliott Cooper

=== Guests ===
- Magic Johnson
- Smokey Robinson
- Johnny Gill
- Dave Winfield
- EJ Johnson
- Simone Smith
- Cecelia Friday
- Diann Valentine
- Ebie Wright

No.	Mathis Family Matters	Original release date
1	"Meet The Mathises"	June 19, 2022
Siblings Jade, Greg Jr., Camara and Amir head out for a night on the town while Greg and Linda take on babysitting responsibilities for their precious grandkids.
2	"Love, Mathis Style"	June 19, 2022
Love is in the air as Linda attempts to reignite the spark in her 36-year marriage to Greg; the siblings confront Amir about moving too fast with his new girlfriend, especially since he's still legally married.
3	"Up in Your Business"	June 26, 2022
The East Coast kids tire of their living situations and start looking for a house together; Amir and Judge travel to Chicago for the 23rd season wrap up of "Judge Mathis"
4	"Meet the Parents"	July 3, 2022
Greg, Jade and Elliott move into their new house and decide to host a housewarming party; against his siblings' wishes, Amir has Judge and Linda meet his girlfriend, Sally, and brings her to the housewarming party.
5	"Mathis Family Campers"	July 10, 2022
Camara plans a camping adventure with the whole family, and alter-ego Mama Boss comes out in full force; Greg gets angry when Elliott is mandated to cook while the rest of the family plays games.
6	"Out, Proud, Mathis"	July 17, 2022
Greg Jr. prepares to follow in the judge's footsteps to become an advocate for the LGBTQ community, but first must come out to the public with or without his boyfriend, Elliott, by his side.
7	"Shamans and Trolls"	July 22, 2022
To protect his father's reputation, Greg Jr. takes over the Judge's social media accounts to prevent him from responding to Internet trolls.
8	"Dating Shadey Jadey"	July 31, 2022
Jade's push and pull between DC and LA gets even more intense when a romantic flame from back East visits and meets the family.
9	"She Social Graces"	August 7, 2022
Linda and Camara host their annual She Social event where Linda must conquer her fear of public speaking. Amir feels the pressure to impress his dad when they record a podcast together.
10	"Mathis Family Legacy"	August 14, 2022
In celebration of the Judge's historic career, he is awarded a star on the Hollywood Walk of Fame and the entire Mathis family gathers for a glitzy, star-studded party in his honor. Elliott and Greg Jr. share some exciting news.

== Awards and Accolades ==
Mathis Family Matters was honored with the Family Award at the 2023 Truth Awards hosted in partnership with Sheryl Lee Ralph and her DIVA Foundation. Additional Honorees at the 2023 Truth Awards included: Raven-Symoné (Icon Award), Tabitha Brown (Ally Award) and Netflix series The Upshaws (Cultural Affirmation Award).

Mathis Family Matters also received a nomination for a GLAAD Media Award in the category of Outstanding Reality Program. Other nominees in the category included: The Voice (NBC), Top Chef (Bravo) and So You Think You Can Dance (FOX).
