= High Freakquency =

- DVD cover
- Directed by: Tony Singletary
- Written by: Rob Gomes
- Produced by: Cassius Weathersby; Curtis M. Shaw
- Starring: Marcus Chong; Deon Richmond; John Witherspoon; Adrienne-Joi Johnson
- Release date: 1998
- Country: United States
- Language: English

High Freakquency is a 1998 comedy directed by Tony Singletary about life at an urban radio station. The film's tagline is Where Comedy Is In Heavy Rotation.

== Synopsis ==
24-7 Radio finds itself at the top of the charts, yet all is not well in radio paradise as a series of quirky and mentally challenged DJ's jockey for ratings and professional success.

Station Manager Wes Thomas (John Witherspoon), is trying to force an inappropriate play list on station DJ and Program Director Jordan (Marcus Chong). Jordan resists the songs for music that moves the listeners. He teams up with the support of fellow DJ Venom (Adrienne-Joi Johnson), as a romance develops between the two. Also starring Ajai Sanders) and a special appearance by Adina Howard.

== Cast ==
- John Witherspoon as Wes Thomas
- Marcus Chong as Jordan Barnes
- Adrienne-Joi Johnson as D.J. Venom
- Deon Richmond as Coffee Boy
- Ajai Sanders as LaShanda
- Paul Mooney as Love Doctor
- Adina Howard as Performer

== Home video ==
For one of the film's DVD releases it is titled "Da Station" with the closing credits edited out, and the DVD cover crediting Alan Smithee as the director.
