= Wild Goat Surf =

2023 Canadian drama film

- Directed by: Caitlyn Sponheimer
- Written by: Caitlyn Sponheimer
- Produced by: Mike Johnston; Caitlyn Sponheimer; Warren Sulatycky
- Starring: Shayelin Martin; Leandro Guedes; Dyllón Burnside; Caitlyn Sponheimer; Brittany Drisdelle
- Cinematography: Joseph Schweers
- Edited by: Sarah Trudelle
- Music by: Cayne McKenzie
- Production company: Studio 104 Entertainment
- Release date: September 29, 2023 (VIFF)
- Running time: 104 minutes
- Country: Canada
- Language: English

Wild Goat Surf is a 2023 Canadian coming-of-age drama film, directed by Caitlyn Sponheimer. The film stars Shayelin Martin as Rell "Goat" Anderson, a young girl living in a trailer park in Penticton, British Columbia, who aspires to become a surfer like her recently deceased father despite living hundreds of miles from the ocean.

The cast also includes Sponheimer as Goat's mother Jane, Leandro Guedes as Nate, Dyllón Burnside as Jason and Brittany Drisdelle as Erin.

The film entered production in August 2022 in and around Pencticton.

The film premiered at the 2023 Vancouver International Film Festival.

== Critical response ==
For Exclaim!, Holly Hunt rated the film 8 out of 10, writing that "What begins as a film centred on the pains of youth and everything entwined in that process matures into a film about overcoming bereavement. The script is littered with myriad memorable lines that bounced around my mind long after hearing them...A deeply realistic and poignant portrayal of navigating the loss of someone special, Wild Goat Surf materializes as a meticulously written and captivatingly shot film that resonates long after the credits have finished rolling."
