= Dyllón Burnside =

American actor & singer (born 1989)

- Born: Dyllón Burnside; January 27, 1989 (age 37); Miami, Florida, U.S.
- Occupations: Actor, singer
- Years active: 2014–present

Dyllón Burnside (born January 27, 1989) is an American actor and singer. He is known for his role as Ricky Evangelista in the FX television series Pose.

== Career ==
Burnside got his first start at age 12 when he performed as the lead singer of hip-hop/R&B boy band “3D” with two of his cousins and managed by his mother, touring with the likes of Stevie Wonder and Rihanna, with a distribution deal with Atlantic Records and performing in venues including Madison Square Garden and the Nokia Theater. After 10 years, he began feeling constricted by fronting a boy band and wanted to explore arts less traditionally masculine: "The things that I was interested in didn’t necessarily align with my family’s or society’s idea of what it meant to be a man. ... I can still be a male and sing Mozart or take a ballet class and that it not have anything to do with anything other than I wanted to take a ballet class." As a result, he enrolled at the CAP21 conservatory to take a vocal major, moved to New York City and took acting and dance classes including studying for a bachelor's degree in media studies and writing from The New School.

While at CAP21, Burnside starred in the Tupac-inspired musical Holler if Ya Hear Me on Broadway in 2014, playing Anthony. While studying, Burnside was also a part of NBC's Peter Pan Live!, HBO's High Maintenance and performed in BeBe Winans's musical Born For This in both Atlanta and Washington, D.C.

Burnside has also worked as a film producer on the award-winning short The Jump and as theatrical producer on Hold Up The Light at the non-profit Arena Stage in Washington, D.C. He has also taught performing arts workshops and has spoken at schools about how studying performing arts can be empowering and help young people find their means of self-expression.

Burnside emceed a benefit concert, duetting with Pose co-stars Billy Porter and Ryan Jamaal Swain to celebrate the Pose season 1 finale on July 23, 2018, raising money for GLSEN, and talking about his coming out story and speaking with former Vibe editor-in-chief Emil Wilbekin about the importance of safe spaces for LGBTQ people.

In July 2021, in the same period the final episode of Pose was aired, it was released the musical single Heaven featuring the British singer Daley, written in February 2021 as a celebration of LGBTQ love. In the same month Burnside was featured in the fourth episode of the anthology TV series American Horror Stories by Murphy&Falchuk. In Fall 2021 he came back on Broadway stage as one of the seven Afro-American leads of the show Thoughts of a Colored Man.

In 2025, Burnside portrayed celebrity stylist Dwen Curry in the BET+ Original Film "Fighting to Be Me: The Dwen Curry Story.

== Personal life ==
Burnside grew up on a ranch in Pensacola, Florida. His family raised farm animals, including chickens, cows, horses and pigs.

Burnside has spoken about toxic masculinity: "All of the work that I seek to do and the work I want to do is about pushing the boundaries or blurring the lines of what it means to be a man. I think manhood as a construct is very dangerous and has caused a lot of pain and destruction in our world" and recognises the importance of Pose for representing LGBTQ people of color. For National Coming Out Day 2019, he wrote about the importance of acceptance and representation, "which is why I stand so firmly in my truth and speak openly about my experience". He has described influences including bell hooks, James Baldwin, Eckhart Tolle and Marianne Williamson, as well as gospel music being a part of going to church that spoke to him.

In an interview for Men's Health magazine in September 2020, Burnside described his identity as "queer, not gay", describing that he has had "relationships — romantic and sexual — with women as well as men", adding that "for me, queerness is about understanding that I exist outside of the sexual binary of just gay or straight".

== Filmography ==
=== Film ===
Year	Title	Role	Notes
2016	Misunderstood	Sin	Short film
2017	Central Park	Christian	
2018	Yinz	Shane Tompkins	
2023	Wild Goat Surf	Jason	
2025	Fighting to Be Me: The Dwen Curry Story	Dwen Curry	

=== Television ===
Year	Title	Role	Notes
2014	High Maintenance	Lionel	Episode: "Genghis"
2014	Peter Pan Live!	Prickles	Television movie
2018–21	Pose	Ricky	18 episodes
2021–24	American Horror Stories	James	Episode: "The Naughty List"
2021–24	American Horror Stories	Malcolm	Episode: "X"
2022	Dahmer – Monster: The Jeffrey Dahmer Story	Ronald Flowers	2 episodes

== Theatre ==
Year	Title	Role	Ref.
2023	BLACK SUPERHERO	King	
