= D. B. Woodside =

American actor

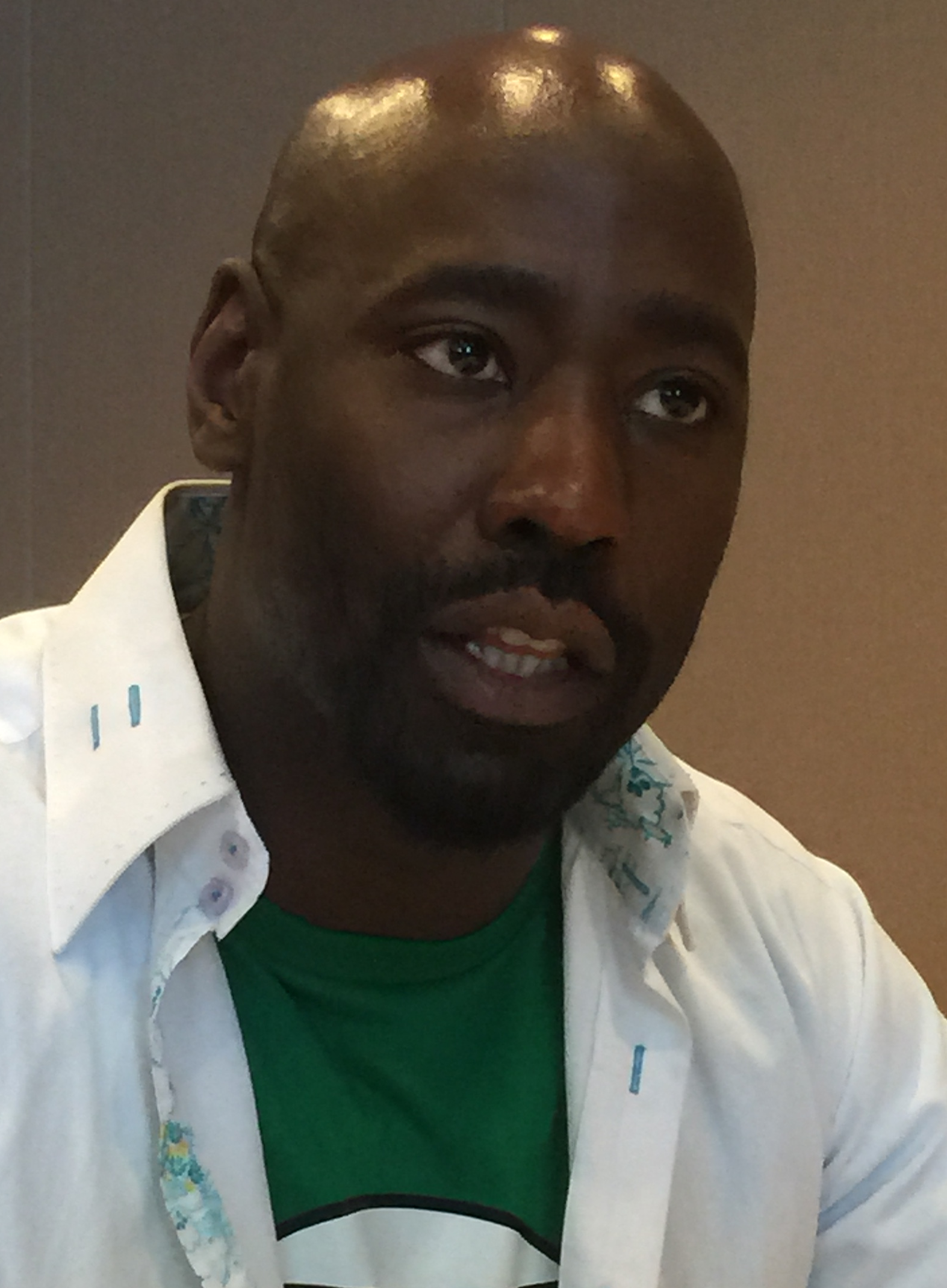
- Woodside in July 2015
- Born: David Bryan Woodside; July 25, 1969 (age 57); New York City, U.S.
- Education: State University of New York, Albany (BA); Yale University (MFA)
- Occupation: Actor
- Years active: 1996–present
- Partner: Golden Brooks (2008–2010)
- Children: 1

David Bryan Woodside (born July 25, 1969) is an American actor. He is best known for his television roles as the bass singer Melvin Franklin in The Temptations, Robin Wood in Buffy the Vampire Slayer, Malcolm Franks in Single Ladies, Jeff Malone in Suits, Dr. Joseph Prestridge in Parenthood, the angel Amenadiel in Lucifer, and Wayne Palmer in the thriller series 24.

== Early life ==
David Bryan Woodside was born in Jamaica, Queens, in New York City, on July 25, 1969. He was a chess champion in High School. He has a BA from the State University of New York at Albany and an MFA from the Yale School of Drama.

== Career ==
Woodside got his start playing Aaron Mosley in the second season of Murder One in 1996. After the series was cancelled, he guest starred on The Practice, Snoops, The Division, and Once and Again. Woodside made a guest appearance on JAG in its final season as FBI agent Rod Benton. From 2002 to 2003, he starred in 14 episodes of the final season of Buffy the Vampire Slayer as Robin Wood, the Principal of Sunnydale High School. Woodside followed this up by playing the pragmatic Wayne Palmer, the Chief of Staff, on the Fox series 24. Introduced in the third season, he returned to reprise the role as a guest star in the series' fifth season in episodes 1–2 and 14–18 and returned as a series regular for the sixth season as the President of the United States.

Woodside had a guest role as Marlon Waylord in the 2004 CSI episode "Harvest". In 2007, he was a guest star on Grey's Anatomy in the show's 4th-season episode "Forever Young" wherein he played the character of Marcus. Woodside also guest-starred as a doctor in the series finale of the USA Network series Monk. In 2009, he starred in the first season of the US drama Lie to Me. He then had a recurring role on the CW series Hellcats. From 2011 to 2014, Woodside starred as Malcolm Franks on the VH1 series Single Ladies, playing opposite LisaRaye McCoy as Keisha Greene. In June 2014, he began appearing in Suits as Jeff Malone. In 2016, he began playing the angel Amenadiel in the Fox/Netflix series Lucifer. In 2023, Woodside starred as Erik Monks, a veteran U.S. Secret Service agent newly assigned to the vice president's daughter on the Netflix series The Night Agent. In 2025, Woodside starred as Uncle Leon in the BET+ Original Film "Fighting to Be Me: The Dwen Curry Story".

== Personal life ==
Woodside was in a relationship with actress Golden Brooks from 2008 to 2010. They have a daughter, who was born in 2009.

== Filmography ==
=== Film ===
Year	Title	Role	Notes
1998	Scar City	Forrest	
2000	Romeo Must Die	Colin O'Day	
2000	More Dogs Than Bones	Truman	
2003	Easy	Martin Mars	
2003	Something More	Greg	Short
2007	First.	Mooney	Short
2009	Mississippi Damned	Tyrone Tensely	
2011	The Inheritance	Henry	
2014	That Awkward Moment	Vera's Lawyer	
2015	Paul Blart: Mall Cop 2	Robinson	
2015	The Man in 3B	Det. Thomas	
2017	The Lego Batman Movie	Killer Moth	Voice, uncredited
2019	Smile	Dad	Short
2025	Taken at a Basketball Game	Wayne Edwards	
2025	Fighting to Be Me: The Dwen Curry Story	Uncle Leon	

=== Television ===
Year	Title	Role	Notes
1996–1997	Murder One	Aaron Mosely	Main cast (season 2)
1997	The Practice	Aaron Wilton	Episode: "The Means"
1997	Murder One: Diary of a Serial Killer	Aaron Mosely	Miniseries
1998	Prey	Mark	Episode: "Deliverance: Part 1"
1998	The Temptations	Melvin "Blue" Franklin	Miniseries
1999	Snoops	Avery	Episode: "Higher Calling"
1999	After All	Anthony	TV movie
2001	The Division	Daniel Reide	Recurring cast (season 1)
2002	Once and Again	Henry Higgins	Episode: "Falling in Place" & "Chance of a Lifetime"
2002	Girls Club		Episode: "Book of Virtues"
2002	Flashpoint	Addison	TV movie
2002–2003	Buffy the Vampire Slayer	Robin Wood	Recurring cast (season 7)
2003	The Law and Mr. Lee	Branford Lee	TV movie
2003	CSI: Miami	Cole Judson	Episode: "Entrance Wound"
2003–2007	24	Wayne Palmer	Recurring cast (season 3 & 5), main cast (season 6)
2004	CSI: Crime Scene Investigation	Marlon Waylord	Episode: "Harvest"
2004	JAG	FBI Special Agent Rob Benton	Episode: "The Man on the Bridge"
2007	Viva Laughlin	Marcus	Recurring cast
2007	Grey's Anatomy	Marcus King	Episode: "Forever Young"
2008	Numbers	Jonathan Schmidt	Episode: "Blowback"
2009	Lie to Me	Henry Strong	Episode: "Undercover"
2009	Private Practice	Duncan	Episode: "Do the Right Thing" & "Yours, Mine & Ours"
2009	Hawthorne	David Gendler	Recurring cast (season 1)
2009	Castle	Lance Carlberg	Episode: "One Man's Treasure"
2009	Monk	Dr. Matthew Shuler	Episode: "Mr. Monk and the End: Part 1 & 2"
2009	Back	Dr. Kevin Stern	TV movie
2010–2011	Hellcats	Derrick Altman	Recurring cast
2011	Charlie's Angels	Carlton Finch	Episode: "Bon Voyage, Angels"
2011–2012	Parenthood	Dr. Joseph Prestridge	Recurring cast (season 3)
2011–2014	Single Ladies	Malcolm Franks	Main cast (season 1-3)
2013	Emily Owens, M.D.	Evan Hammond	Recurring cast
2014	Halt and Catch Fire	Simon Church	Episode: "Giant"
2014	Love the One You're With		TV movie
2014–2018	Suits	Jeff Malone	Recurring cast (season 4), guest (season 5-7)
2016–2021	Lucifer	Amenadiel	Main role (Seasons 1-6), 80 episodes
2018	S.W.A.T.	Agent Gines	Episode: "Hoax"
2018	The Fixer	S.O.B.	Episode: "Pilot"
2019	Pearson	Jeff Malone	Recurring cast
2019	Dealbreakers	Rick	Episode: "Big Daddy"
2021	Young Justice	Phantom Stranger (voice)	Recurring cast
2023	9-1-1: Lone Star	Trevor Parks	Recurring cast
2023	The Night Agent	Erik Monks	Main role (Season 1), 7 episodes
