= Tara (2001 film) =

- Directed by: Leslie Small
- Starring: Isaiah Washington; Ice-T; A.J. Johnson; Tonea Stewart; Steve Warren
- Music by: Adam Berry
- Release date: 2001

Tara is a 2001 film, known in the United States as Hood Rat. Directed by Leslie Small, it was released direct-to-video, and was poorly received. It focuses on a soft homeless man who befriends a rat he names Tara.

== Cast ==
- Isaiah Washington as Max
- Ice-T as Grady
- A.J. Johnson as Nina
- Tonea Stewart as Vetta Taylor
- Tami Roman as Honorable D. Bankhead
- Steve Warren as Public defender
