= Adrienne-Joi Johnson =

American actress (born 1963)

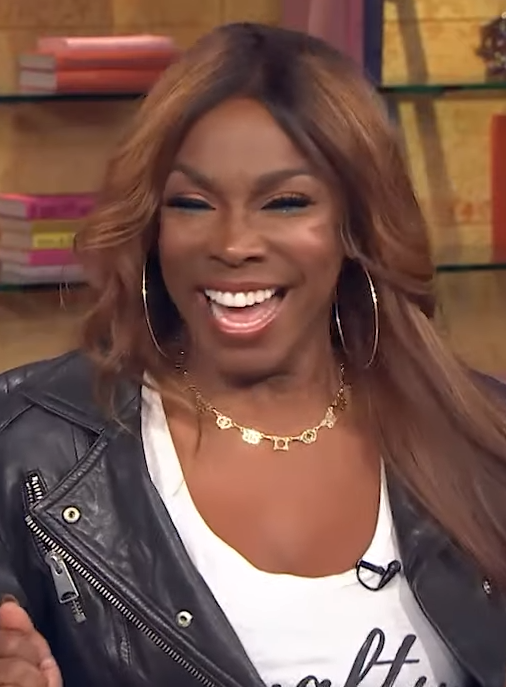
- Johnson in 2020
- Born: January 2, 1963 (age 63); Orange, New Jersey, U.S.
- Other name: A. J. Johnson
- Education: Spelman College
- Occupations: Actress; dancer; fitness trainer; life coach; model
- Years active: 1987–present
- Website: www.theajzone.com

Adrienne-Joi Johnson (born January 2, 1963), also known as A. J. Johnson, is an American actress, choreographer, fitness trainer, and life coach. Acting since 1987, Johnson has made many guest appearances on sitcoms, television dramas and music videos; she also has numerous supporting roles in films, including House Party and Baby Boy.

== Early life and education ==
Raised in Fair Haven, New Jersey, Johnson graduated from Rumson-Fair Haven Regional High School in 1981. She graduated with honors in 1985 from Spelman College in Atlanta. She is a member of Delta Sigma Theta sorority.

== Career ==
She has appeared in A Different World, In the Heat of the Night, The Fresh Prince of Bel-Air, Amen, the short-lived Sirens, Chicago Hope, The Jamie Foxx Show, and Touched by an Angel. She has also appeared in television movies such as A Mother's Courage: the Mary Thomas Story (1989), Clippers (1991), Murder Without Motive: The Edmund Perry Story (1992), Love, Lies & Lullabies (1993), The Beast (1996), and Fighting to Be Me: The Dwen Curry Story (2025).

Johnson has appeared in theatrical releases and independent films such as School Daze (1988), House Party (1990), Double Trouble (1992), Sister Act (1992), The Inkwell (1994), High Freakquency (1998), Two Shades of Blue (2000), Tara (2001), Baby Boy (2001), and Skin Deep (2003).

== Filmography ==
=== Film ===
Year	Title	Role	Notes
1988	School Daze	Cecilia	
1989	A Mother's Courage: The Mary Thomas Story	Ruby Thomas	TV movie
1990	House Party	Sharane	
1991	Clippers	Renee	TV movie
1991	Dying Young	Shauna	
1992	Murder Without Motive: The Edmund Perry Story	Cynthia	TV movie
1992	Double Trouble	Danitra	
1992	Sister Act	Lewanda	
1993	Love, Lies & Lullabies	Nurse	TV movie
1994	The Inkwell	Heather Lee	
1998	High Freakquency	D.J. Venom	
1999	Two Shades of Blue	Lisa	
2001	Tara	Nina	Video
2001	Baby Boy	Juanita	
2003	Black Listed	Mild Cat	Video
2003	Skin Deep	Sarah	
2019	Sins of the Father	Detective Phylicia Richardson	TV movie
2020	Holiday Heartbreak	Joyce	TV movie
2023	Whatever It Takes	Alafia	TV movie
2025	Fighting to Be Me: The Dwen Curry Story	Cynthia Curry	

=== Television ===
Year	Title	Role	Notes
1988	A Different World	Girl #3	Episode: "Mr. Hillman"
1989	In the Heat of the Night	Shawna Hughes	Episode: "These Things Take Time"
1989	Day by Day	Frances	Episode: "Foul Play"
1989	CBS Summer Playhouse	Annie	Episode: "Coming to America"
1990	New Attitude	Tanya	Episode: "The Case of the Missing Toupee"
1990	The Fresh Prince of Bel-Air	Christina Johnson	Episode: "Def Poet's Society"
1990	1st & Ten	Loretta	Episode: "The Squeeze"
1991	Amen	Courteney	Episode: "My Fair Homeboy"
1993–95	Sirens	Officer Lynn Stanton	Main Cast
1995	The Preston Episodes	Marilyn	Episode: "David's First Date Episode"
1996	The Beast	Nell Newcombe	Episode: "Episode #1.1 & #1.2"
1996	Chicago Hope	Trish Cook	Episode: "Liver Let Die"
1997	The Jamie Foxx Show	Janine	Episode: "I Do, I Didn't"
1999	JAG	Lt. Gold	Episode: "The Return"
2000	Cover Me	Dolores	Episode: "Our Mr. Brooks" & "Turtle Soup"
2001	Touched by an Angel	Yvette Lakes	Episode: "Angels Anonymous"
2004	Flab to Fab	Herself/Host	Main Host
2008	Baisden After Dark	Herself	Episode: "Episode #2.2"
2010	K-Ci & JoJo: Come Clean	Herself/Life Coach	Episode: "Freakin' You"
2011	Life After	Herself	Episode: "AJ Johnson"
2012	Unsung	Herself	Episode: "Atlantic Starr"
2013	Exhale	Herself	Episode: "Health & Wellness"
2014	Lindsay	Herself/Life Coach	Recurring Cast
2015	Unsung Hollywood	Herself	Episode: "Baby Boy"
2015	Unsung	Herself	Episode: "Kid 'n Play"
2016	Family Time	Tracy	Episode: "The Things We Do for Love"
2017–19	The Jellies!	Debbie Jelly (voice)	Main Cast
2019	Uncensored	Herself	Episode: "Tisha Campbell"
2020	Stuck with You	Stephanie	Recurring Cast: Season 1
2020	Love & Hip Hop: Miami	Herself	Episode: "Full Circle"
2021	Hollywood Homecoming	Herself	Episode: "House Party"
2021	Life Therapy	Herself/Host	Main Host
2023	Legacy	Gloria	Main Cast
2023	Act Your Age	Celine	Episode: "Body of Work"

=== Music videos ===
Year	Song	Artist
1987	"Criticize"	Alexander O'Neal
1988	"Just Coolin'"	LeVert

== Awards and nominations ==
Year	Award	Category	Film	Result
1990	NAACP Image Awards	Outstanding Young Ensemble Cast in a Motion Picture	A Mother's Courage: The Mary Thomas Story	Won
1991	Independent Spirit Awards	Best Supporting Female in a comedy-drama film	House Party	Nominated
2002	Black Reel Awards	Theatrical- Best Supporting actress in a Motion Picture	Baby Boy	Nominated
