= Jemeker Thompson =

American drug dealer

- Born: Jemeker Thompson
- Other names: Jemeker Mosley Thompson, Jemeker Thompson-Hairston, Jemeker Hairston
- Education: High School
- Occupation: Christian evangelist
- Years active: 1980s
- Known for: Being a Queen Pin
- Notable work: Queen Pin memoir
- Status: released in 2005
- Convictions: Conspiracy to distribute cocaine Money laundering
- Penalty: 15 year prison term

Details
- Country: U.S.
- States: Illinois, California

Jemeker Thompson-Hairston is an American former drug dealer who rose to the top of the cocaine trade during the peak of the 1980s crack epidemic in the United States. She was based in "South Central" Los Angeles and had cocaine distributors in multiple US cities working for her.

== Biography ==
When Thompson was 8 years old, she and her mother were evicted from their apartment in South Los Angeles (formerly known as South Central Los Angeles), and their belongings were strewn outside. In the Netflix documentary episode about her life as a drug dealer, Thompson states that "I knew then that I wanted money and that I wanted to control everything." She ran track in high school and was the girlfriend of Anthony "Daff" Mosley. Daff was dealing marijuana and Thompson began collecting payments for him.

Thompson began selling between 3 and 4 kilos of cocaine a week, while still in high school. She and "Daff" married in 1980, and began selling crack cocaine. Thompson's drug dealing business boomed, she and her husband bought a home in Encino, California and in 1982, had a son. When "Daff" was murdered, Drug Enforcement Administration agents, who had been watching Thompson, thought she would stop drug dealing. In 1984, she began to grow her business again by recruiting distributors around the U.S. and for some time began getting the cocaine directly from producers in Colombia. At age 26, she opened a hair distribution business (of wigs and hair extensions), which Thompson said was a legitimate business but authorities said was used for laundering drug profits.

When Percy "Cheese" Bratton, her business partner, was arrested with kilos of cocaine in his car, he made a deal with investigators, providing the evidence needed to indict Thompson. Thompson tried to avoid capture, but at the age of 31, was arrested at her son's 6th grade graduation ceremony. Thompson was charged with conspiracy to distribute cocaine and five counts of money laundering. Thompson was indicted, convicted and completed 12 of her 15-year prison sentence. During her time in prison, Thompson converted to Christianity and after her release, began a Christian ministry called Second Chance Evangelical Ministries. Her son became a professional skateboarder. Thompson-Hairston is married to Champ Hairston.

== Memoir ==
The crack epidemic in the U.S. was a time during the 1980s when people were using crack cocaine as payment for every day goods, crack cocaine was cheap. Thompson wrote about her life during that time in Queen Pin, co-written with David Ritz. It was published in 2010. In a mixed review, Kirkus Reviews said that it "lacks the salacious elements that make criminal memoirs compelling," but noted that it "may appeal to believers" due to its religious content.

== Drug Lords episode ==
Thompson was the subject of an episode in the second season of the Netflix series Drug Lords. On July 10, 2018, Netflix aired an episode featuring Thompson's story. In the documentary she talked about making millions in the drug trade, her time in prison, converting to Christianity and doing Christian ministry since her release from prison.

== Gangsters: America's Most Evil ==
Thompson was the subject of the 8th episode of the first season of Gangsters: America's Most Evil. A&E aired the episode on September 12, 2012, which documented that Thompson was one of the top contributors to the 1980s crack epidemic in the United States.

== Christian ministry ==
Thompson's change from drug dealer to evangelist was featured on The 700 Club, a program on the Christian Broadcasting Network.

== See also ==
- Women in the drug economy in the United States
