= Fighting to Be Me: The Dwen Curry Story =

- Directed by: Joe Carroll
- Written by: LaJill Hunt
- Produced by: Judge Greg Mathis; Tressa Smallwood; Dyllón Burnside; Delece James; Donte Lee; Dwen Curry
- Starring: Dyllón Burnside; A.J. Johnson; D.B. Woodside; Greg Mathis Jr
- Cinematography: Michael Street
- Edited by: Charles Jones
- Music by: Jerry "Juke" Vines
- Production company: MegaMind Media
- Distributed by: BET+
- Release date: February 27, 2025
- Running time: 97 minutes
- Country: United States
- Language: English

Fighting to Be Me: The Dwen Curry Story is an American biographical crime drama film written by LaJill Hunt and directed by Joe Carroll. The film stars Dyllón Burnside as celebrity stylist and fashion icon Dwen Curry. The film follows Curry secretly financing a lavish lifestyle by fraudulently acquiring millions of dollars using her criminal organization, The Gay Gangsters. The film also stars A.J. Johnson, D.B. Woodside, Greg Mathis Jr, Mike Rob, Maurice Alpharicio, Erika Norrell and Rodrick Covington, with Curry making a cameo appearance.

The film was released by BET+ on February 27, 2025.

== Cast ==
- Dyllón Burnside as Dwen Curry
- A.J. Johnson as Cynthia Curry
- D.B. Woodside as Uncle Leon
- Greg Mathis Jr as Derreck "DJ" Johnson
- Mike Rob as Jihad
- Maurice Alpharicio as Zaire
- Erika Norrell as LisaRaye McCoy
- Rodrick Covington as Butchie
- Chanel Mack as Sherrie
- Chantal Maurice as YoYo

== Production ==
On December 16, 2024 Deadline reported that Fighting to Be Me: The Dwen Curry story would premiere on BET+. The film is directed by Joe Carroll and Executive Produced by Judge Greg Mathis, Tressa Smallwood, Delece James, Donte Lee, Dyllón Burnside and Dwen Curry. Filming took place in June 2024 in Washington, D.C.
