= Ajai Sanders =

American actress and comedian (born 1967)

- Born: Angela Marrine Wilson; April 24, 1967 (age 59); Dallas, Texas, U.S.
- Other name: Ajai Richards
- Occupations: Actress; comedian
- Years active: 1991–present
- Known for: Gina Deveaux – A Different World
- Spouse: Michael Brownlee (m. 2002; div. 2016)

Ajai Sanders (born Angela Marrine Wilson; April 24, 1967) is an American actress and stand-up comedian, best known for her supporting role as Gina Deveaux in the sitcom A Different World from 1991 until the series original ending in 1993.

== Biography ==
Born Angela Marie Wilson, Sanders grew up in Dallas, Texas. She attended Hillcrest High School, graduating in 1985. Sanders moved to Los Angeles and began working as a stand-up comic; eventually this work led to what initially was to be a one-time role on A Different World. The guest role was expanded after director Debbie Allen proved impressed by the qualities Sanders brought to the character, whose appearances were expanded to five that season and 18 the following season, after which she was added to the show's opening credits.

Sanders has made guest appearances on the sitcoms Martin, Hangin' with Mr. Cooper, The Fresh Prince of Bel-Air, The Parent 'Hood, The Wayans Bros., The Jamie Foxx Show, and Moesha. She also guest-starred in a 2001 episode of the Lifetime show, The Division. Sanders had a major role in the independent urban comedy, High Freakquency, in which she was credited by mistake, as Ajai Richards. She had a smaller role in the Michael Keaton Christmas comedy, Jack Frost, and also appeared in the 2000 urban independent drama, The Playaz Court. She is currently hosting a talk show called Multiple Personalities with Ajai Sanders on Business Bully TV.

== Personal ==
Sanders has been married once and has no children. In May 2002, Sanders married Micheal Brownlee in Denton, Texas. They later divorced in August 2016.

== Filmography ==
=== Film ===
Year	Title	Role	Notes
1998	Jack Frost	Interviewer	
1998	High Freakquency	LaShanda	
1999	A Luv Tale	Ruth	
2000	The Playaz Court	Yolanda	
2023	Spaghetti	Iris	

=== Television ===
Year	Title	Role	Notes
1991–93	A Different World	Gina Deveaux	Recurring Cast: Season 4–5, Main Cast: Season 6
1992	Def Comedy Jam	Herself	Episode: "Episode #1.6" & "#2.3"
1993	Soul Train	Herself/Guest Host	Episode: "Raven-Symone/Aaron Hall/Tag Team"
1993	Martin	Thomasina	Episode: "Baby, It's You"
1995	Hangin' with Mr. Cooper	Denise	Recurring Cast: Season 3
1995	The Fresh Prince of Bel-Air	Jana/Candace	Guest: Season 5, Recurring Cast: Season 6
1996	The Parent 'Hood	Kiki	Episode: "Torn Between Two Brothers"
1997	The Wayans Bros.	Amber	Episode: "Prom Fright"
1997	The Jamie Foxx Show	Irene	Episode: "Misery Loves Company"
2001	Moesha	Lisa	Episode: "Graduation Day"
2001	The Division	Adeen	Episode: "The First Hit's Free, Baby"
2011	Way Black When: Primetime	Herself	Episode: "Episode #1.15"
2011	Are We There Yet?	Tam	Episode: "The Take Your Kids to Work Day Episode"
2020	All the Way Black	Herself	Episode: "It's My House!"
2020	Two Degrees	Ajai	Guest: Season 1, Recurring Cast: Season 2
2022	Phat Tuesdays: The Era Of Hip Hop Comedy	Herself	Main Guest
2026	A Different World	Gina Deveaux	Episode: "Center de Stage"

=== Music videos ===
Year	Artist	Song title	Role
1995	2Pac	"Temptations"	Poker Player
1997	Chris Rock	"Champagne"	Herself
