= Greg Mathis Jr =

American actor

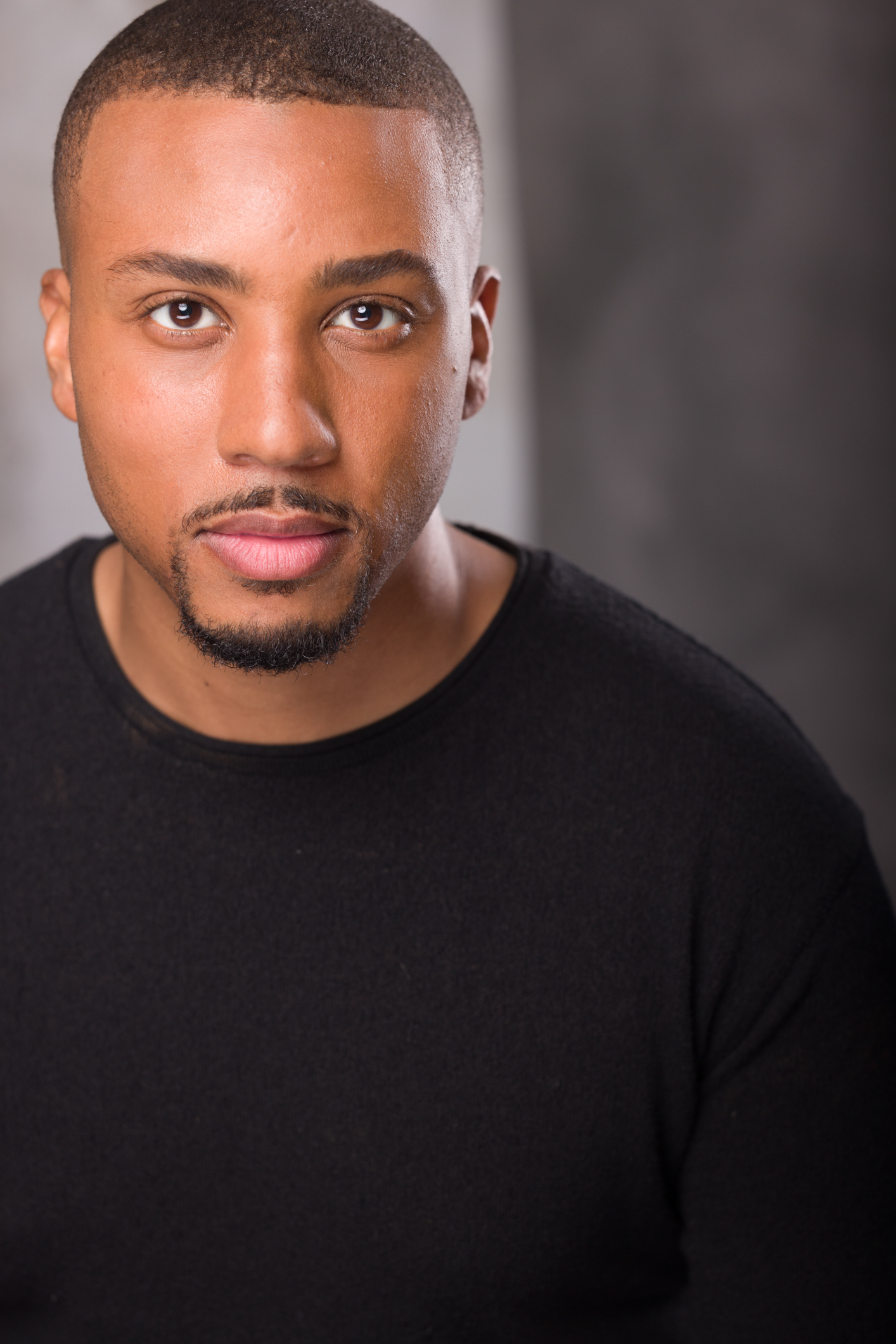
- Born: January 31, 1989 (age 37); Detroit, Michigan, United States
- Education: University of Michigan
- Occupation: Actor
- Height: 5 ft 11 in (180 cm)
- Spouse: Elliott Cooper (married 2024- present)
- Parents: Greg Mathis (father); Linda Mathis (mother)
- Relatives: Jade Mathis (sister); Camara Mathis (sister); Amir Mathis (brother)

Gregory Ellis Mathis Jr. (born January 31, 1989) is an American actor and former political strategist. He began his career in politics in 2010 working for then-Congressman Jesse Jackson Jr. He worked in various roles in politics including on President Barack Obama's 2012 reelection campaign and as a Senior Policy Advisor to Senator Mark R. Warner.

In 2025, Mathis shifted into acting starring in the BET+ Original Film "Fighting to Be Me: The Dwen Curry Story". He is a member of the Towne Street Theatre Company based in Los Angeles, California.

He is the son of Judge Greg Mathis. In 2022, he starred alongside his family in the E! Entertainment docu-series Mathis Family Matters.

== Early life and family ==
Greg Mathis Jr was born on January 31, 1989, in Detroit, Michigan, where he grew up. He is the third child born to Judge Greg Mathis and Linda Mathis (née Reese). Mathis played in several school-based productions, including as the Tinman in the Wizard of Oz at Cranbrook Theatre School and Daddy Warbucks in Annie.

Mathis attended Detroit Country Day School in Bloomfield Hills, Michigan, and later attended the Buckley School in Sherman Oaks for two years after his family relocated to Los Angeles following his sophomore year of high school. He is an alumnus of the University of Michigan, where he studied political science.

== Personal life ==
Mathis is openly gay and married longtime partner Elliott Cooper on October 21, 2024. Mathis' father Judge Greg Mathis and Cooper's father Sergeant Calvin Cooper jointly officiated the wedding ceremony.

== Political career ==
Mathis began his career in public service while still in college, interning for Congressman Jesse Jackson Jr. in the summer of 2010. In 2012, he returned to Jackson's office as a fellow and later became a full-time staff member that same year. Also in 2012, Mathis worked as a campaign staffer on President Barack Obama's re-election campaign in Ohio.

In 2013, Mathis joined the congressional office of (then-Congressman) Senator Gary C. Peters as a legislative assistant. Later that year, Peters' announced he would vacate his congressional seat to run for retiring Senator Carl Levin's U.S. Senate seat. Senator Peters' successfully won the race to replace Senator Levin and retained Mathis on his new staff in the U.S. Senate. During Mathis' tenure Senator Peters served as Member of the United States Senate Committee on Homeland Security and Government Affairs and the United States Senate Committee on Armed Services.

In 2018, Mathis joined the office of Senator Mark R. Warner as a Senior Policy Advisor. During Mathis' tenure Senator Warner served as Vice Chair of the United States Senate Select Committee on Intelligence. The committee and Senator Warner play a leading role in the bipartisan oversight of intelligence agencies, including the CIA, NSA and FBI. In 2019, on behalf of Senator Warner, Mathis led a Senate Cybersecurity Caucus discussion regarding emerging cyber threats and policy recommendations to address them. C-SPAN covered the event.

== Acting career ==
Mathis began acting as a child, starring in school-based productions as the Tinman in the Wizard of Oz and Daddy Warbucks in Annie. In 2025, Mathis made his professional acting debut starring as Derreck "DJ" Johnson in the BET+ Original Film "Fighting to Be Me: The Dwen Curry Story". Later that year, Mathis starred in the film "Whatever, Ever After" on Prime Video.

On February 3, 2026, Philaye Films announced Mathis was set to star in and production had begun on Sci-Fi series Jamaal: Love Code. The series premieres on Here TV, Prime Video and Hulu in July 2026.

Mathis is a member of the Towne Street Theatre Company in Los Angeles where he has performed in a number of productions for the theatre company. The Towne Street Theatre's stated mission is to create, develop and produce original work that is reflective of the African American experience and perspective and how it intersects with other cultures. Towne Street Theatre was founded in 1993 as a response to the LA uprising by Nancy Cheryll Davis Bellamy, Nathaniel Bellamy and Nancy Renee.

In 2024, Mathis played the role of 'Eddie Lo' in playwright Don B. Welch's "Meet Me In The Prayer Room'.

== Acting credits ==
=== Film ===
Year	Title	Role	Notes
2025	Fighting to Be Me: The Dwen Curry Story	Derreck "DJ" Johnson	
2025	Whatever, Ever After	Jordan-M	

=== Television ===
Year	Title	Role	Notes
2026	Jamaal: Love Code	Darien	

=== Theatre ===
Year	Title	Role	Notes
2024	Meet Me in The Prayer Room	Eddie Lo	Don. B Welch
2026	Grieftown	Luke	Towne Street Theatre Company
