= Greg Mathis =

American judge (born 1960)

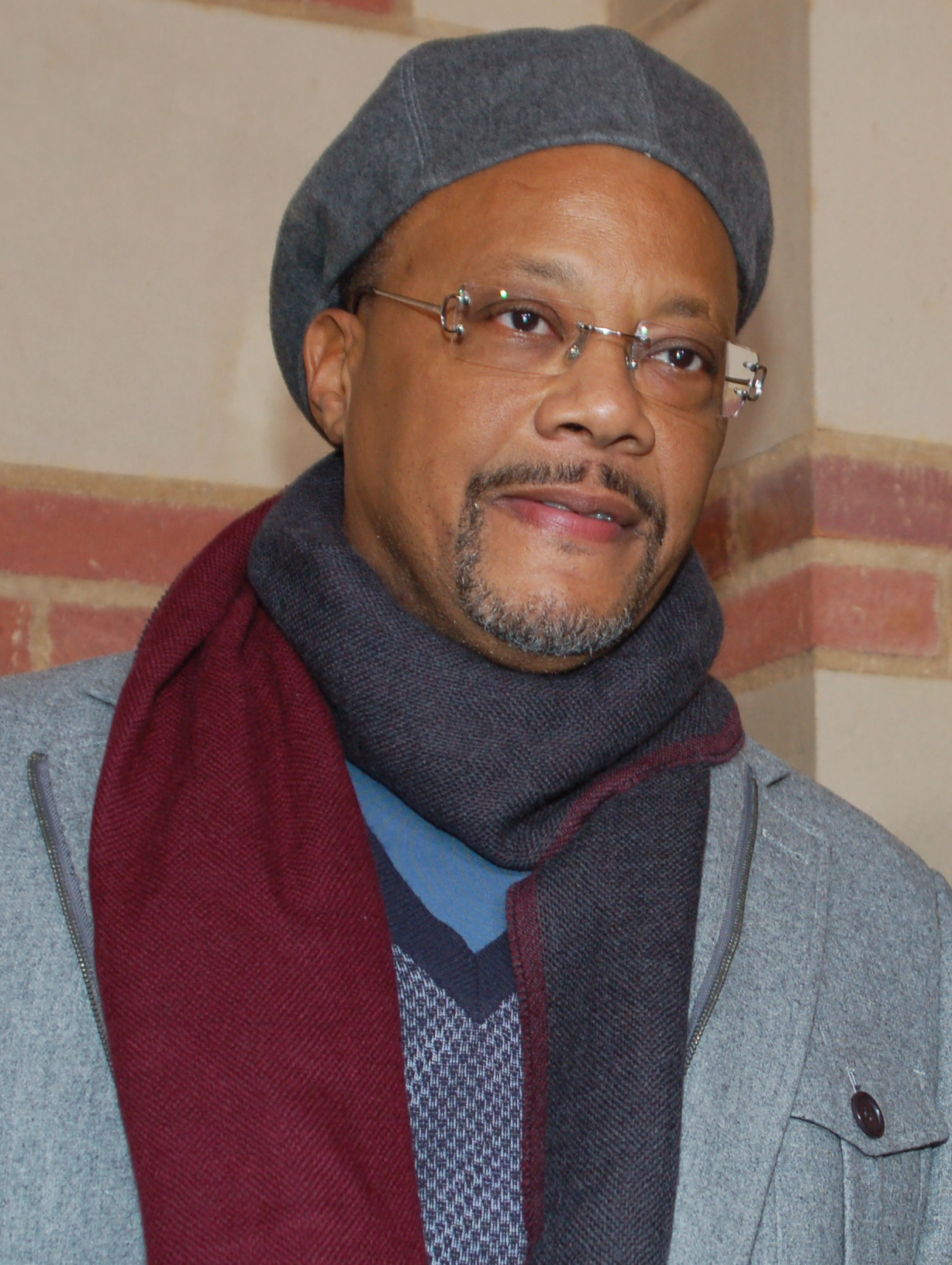
- Mathis in 2010
- Born: Gregory Ellis Mathis; April 5, 1960 (age 66); Detroit, Michigan, U.S.
- Education: Eastern Michigan University (BS); University of Detroit (JD)
- Occupations: Judge; arbitrator; writer; producer; speaker
- Years active: 1995–present
- Office: Judge of the District Court of the State of Michigan (1995–1998)
- Political party: Democratic
- Spouse: Linda Reese (m. 1985)
- Children: Jade Mathis; Camara Mathis; Greg Mathis Jr; Amir Mathis

Gregory Ellis Mathis Sr. (born April 5, 1960), also known as Judge Mathis, is an American former court judge for Michigan's 36th District, who is now a television court show arbitrator, author, film & television producer, and motivational speaker.

For 24 seasons from September 13, 1999 to May 25, 2023, Mathis starred in his NAACP Image Award and Daytime Emmy winning, syndicated reality courtroom show, Judge Mathis, for which he is best known. His program entered its milestone 20th season on Monday, September 3, 2018. Mathis is also the second longest-serving television arbitrator ever, behind only Judith Sheindlin of Judge Judy and Judy Justice by three seasons. Since 2023, Mathis has starred in Mathis Court with Judge Mathis. The series began on September 11, 2023, on Justice Central after the cancellation of its predecessor show, Judge Mathis, in early 2023. On May 5, 2025, Mathis Court with Judge Mathis was renewed for two more seasons through the 2026-2027 television season.

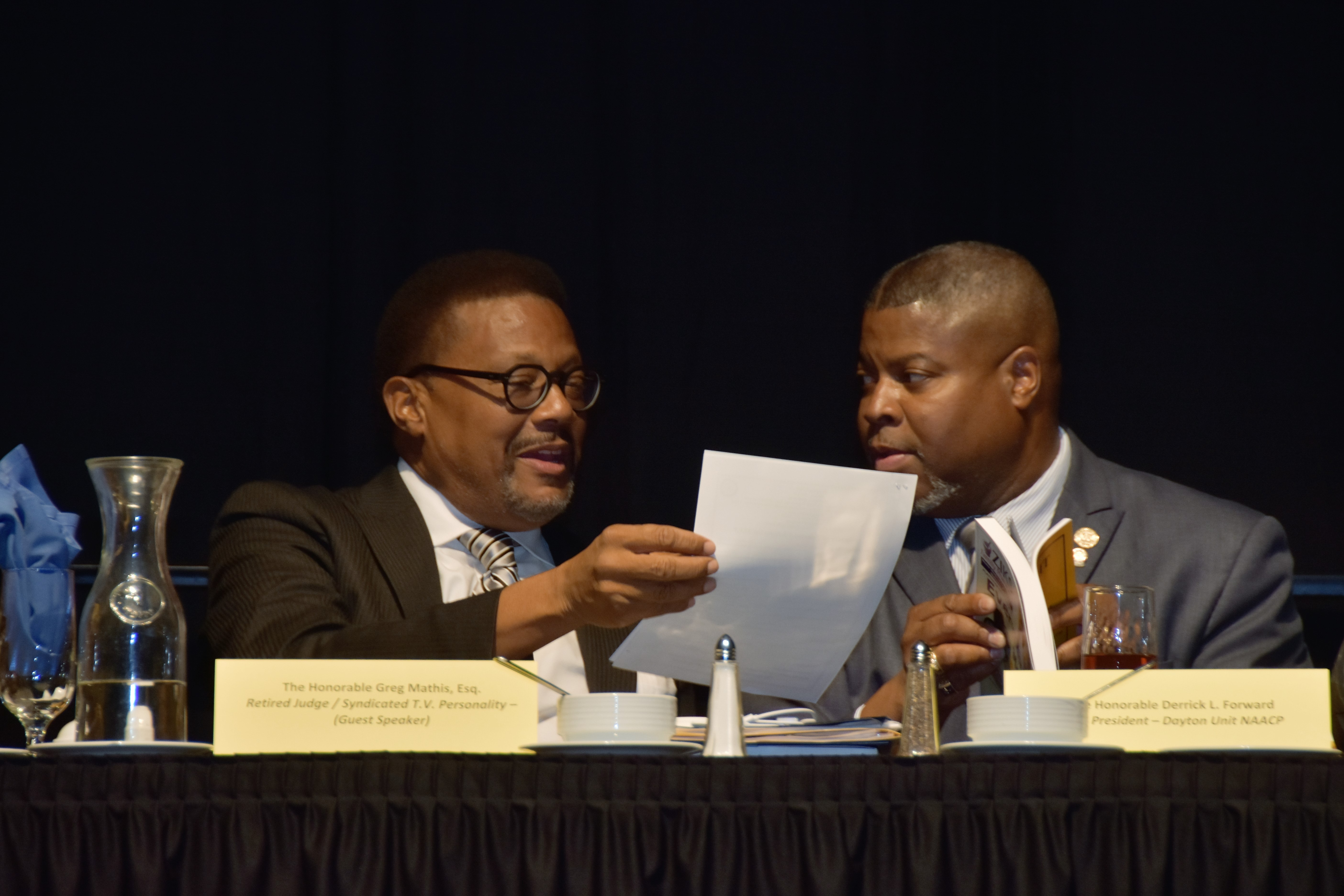
Judge Greg Mathis speaking with Dayton NAACP President Derrick Foward in Dayton, Ohio

Mathis engages in outreach and philanthropy for the state of Michigan, such as for the Flint water crisis. On May 4, 2022, Mathis was honored with a star on the Hollywood Walk of Fame. A spiritually inspired play, Been there, Done that, based on his life toured twenty-two cities in the U.S. in 2002. In addition, Inner City Miracle, a memoir, was published by Ballantine Books.

On June 19, 2022, a new E! reality program, Mathis Family Matters, premiered, starring Greg Mathis as the paternal head of household along with his family and their various loved ones as they encounter various domestic ups and downs. Mathis, and son Amir, served as Executive Producers of the series. It was nominated for a GLAAD Media Award in recognition of its portrayal of his son Greg Jr's coming out story and his relationship with then boyfriend (now husband), Elliott Cooper. The series received widespread acclaim for highlighting Mathis and his family's strong, public support of Greg Jr. and his partner.

== Early life ==
Mathis was born in Detroit, Michigan, to Charles Mathis, a Detroit native, and his wife, Alice Lee Mathis, a devoted Seventh-day Adventist, nurse's aide, and housekeeper. Alice (then divorced from Charles) raised Mathis alone in Detroit during the turbulent 1960s and 1970s. Mathis moved to Herman Gardens in 1964 and resided with family until roughly 1970. They moved away from the housing complex to avoid rising drug use and rates of violent crime. Mathis was arrested several times as a juvenile delinquent, mainly for purse-snatching, breaking-and-entering, and robbery. He would eventually be arrested and put behind bars at age 17 for nine months for a concealed-weapons charge. While he was incarcerated in Wayne County Jail, his mother visited him and revealed she had colon cancer so the judge overhearing his case would subsequently give him an ultimatum of G.E.D or jail time along with early probation. In October 2021, Mathis described Rev. Jesse Jackson as "my most impactful mentor," with the two first meeting when Jackson visited the jail Mathis was being held in. According to Mathis, it was in fact Jackson who "suggested I get my GED, go to college and become an activist."

== Education ==
Once out of jail, Mathis began working at McDonald's, a job he needed to keep to maintain his release on probation. A close family friend helped Mathis get admitted to Eastern Michigan University, and he discovered a new interest in politics and public administration. He became a campus activist and worked for the Democratic Party, organizing several demonstrations against South African Apartheid policies. He graduated with a B.S. in Public Administration from the Ypsilanti campus and began to seek employment in Detroit's City Hall. He also became a member of Alpha Phi Alpha fraternity.

== Career ==
=== Television ===
Mathis's biggest claim to fame is his television court show, Judge Mathis, which ran for 24 seasons from 1999 to 2023. The program is one of the longest-running shows in the court programming genre, 4th in place behind only Divorce Court (still in production), The People's Court (now out of production) and Judge Judy (now out of production), respectively. As Divorce Court and The People's Court have suffered temporary cancellations/re-installments/judge-role recasting, Mathis and Judge Judy boasts the longest single-production runs as well as runs with a single presiding judge. With Judge Judy out of production after 25 seasons as of July 2021, Judge Mathis became the longest-running active single-production court show until its end in 2023. Mathis is also the second-longest-reigning arbitrator in courtroom television history.

Following the success of his ongoing court show, Mathis also stars in another program entitled Mathis Family Matters which revolves around himself, his family, and their loved ones as they face domestic highs and lows.

In 2026, Mathis competed in season fourteen of The Masked Singer as the wild card contestant "14 Karat Carrot". He was eliminated on "Star Trek Night" alongside Evan Ross as "Stingray".

=== Outside of television ===
Mathis began his political career as an unpaid intern, and then became an assistant to Clyde Cleveland, a city council member. It was at this time Mathis took the LSAT and applied to law schools; he was conditionally admitted to the University of Detroit School of Law, which was located in downtown Detroit, walking distance from city hall. He passed a summer course and was officially admitted to the night program, which took four years to complete.

Mathis was denied a license to practice law for several years after graduating from law school because of his criminal past. He received his J.D. from the University of Detroit Mercy in 1987. In 1995, he was elected a district court judge for Michigan's 36th District, making him the youngest person in the state to hold the post. During the five years he was on the bench, he was rated in the top five of all judges in the 36th District; there are about thirty judges each year.

Mathis was appointed head of Jesse Jackson's Presidential campaign in the state of Michigan in 1988. Mathis later became head of Mayor Coleman Young's re-election campaign and after the victory was appointed to run the city's east side city hall.

Mathis has continued to be involved in politics after rising to national entertainment prominence through his television show. Urban politics and African-American movements have been his focus. Most recently, Mathis was invited by the Obama administration to be a part of "My Brothers Keeper", a White House Initiative to empower boys, and men of color.

On June 4, 2011, Detroit-area drivers lined up for blocks as Mathis offered up to $92 worth of free gasoline apiece to the first 92 drivers to show up at a northwest Detroit Mobil station. He told the Detroit Free Press it was a gift to the people who elected him to District Court despite his youthful criminal record. "LA didn't elect me judge," he said. "Chicago didn't elect me judge. Detroiters took a chance on me. It's just the right thing to do. And when you're blessed, you have to look out for the rest." The giveaway took place near the Mathis Community Center, which he funds. Its activities include self-improvement classes, food and clothing assistance, and training for ex-convicts. "No matter what international fame he's achieved, he's still a hometown guy," said WMXD-FM's Frankie Darcell, who announced the location on the air. "Everybody's happy. I'm happy," said gas station owner Mike Safiedine. "The people need it, especially (because) the price is very high."

In September 2008, Mathis wrote a novel called Street Judge, based on the life of a judge who solves murders. It was co-written by Zane, a well-known erotic series writer of Zane's Sex Chronicles. Mathis also wrote a book entitled Of Being a Judge to Criminals and Such.

== Activism ==
Following his time spent in the Herman Gardens mixed-income housing, Mathis remained devoted to aiding families in the area. In 2003, he lobbied city officials on the behalf of former Herman Gardens residents, imploring lawmakers to allow these individuals their first chance to move into new apartments built where Herman Gardens once stood.

== Personal life ==
Mathis met his wife, Linda, a fellow Eastern Michigan University alumnus, shortly after his mother's death. They married in June 1985 and have four children together: a daughter Jade, born May 1985, a daughter Camara, born October 1987, a son Greg Jr. born January 1989 and a son Amir, born July 1990. Mathis, who is a member of the City Temple Seventh-day Adventist Church, was awarded the Black History Achievement Award from Oakwood University, which he says is the most meaningful award he has received.

On August 22, 2024, his wife Linda filed for divorce after 39 years of marriage. In court papers, Linda listed their date of separation as July 17, 2024 and also stated that she filed for divorce due to "irreconcilable differences."

On November 1, 2024, TMZ announced that Mathis and his wife have reconciled. In October 2025. People reported that Mathis and Linda had managed to reconcile only weeks after the divorce filing.

On March 2, 2026, Mathis would attend a memorial service which was held for Rev. Jesse Jackson, who he has openly credited with inspiring him to turn his life around, at the South Carolina State House. He would also publicly speak at Jackson's memorial service at Chicago's House of Hope, noting, among other things, how Jackson was one of the biggest influences in his life.

== Television ==
Host/Self

Year	Title	Role	Notes
1999–2023	Judge Mathis	Host	
2001	The Steve Harvey Show	Self	1 episode
2009	Madea Goes to Jail	Self	1 episode
2010	Meet the Browns	Self	1 episode
2023–present	Mathis Court with Judge Mathis	Host	
2026	The Masked Singer	Self	4 episodes

Producer

Year	Title	Role	Notes
2013	The Mathis Project	Executive Producer	
2014	Just Keke	Executive Producer	
2019–present	American Gangster: Trap Queens	Executive Producer	
2022	Mathis Family Matters	Executive Producer	

== Filmography ==
Year	Title	Role	Notes
2021	American Gangster Presents: Big Fifty: The Delrhonda Hood Story	Executive Producer	
2023	First Lady of BMF: The Tonesa Welch Story	Executive Producer	
2025	Fighting to Be Me: The Dwen Curry Story	Executive Producer	

== Awards and nominations ==
Year	Award	Category	Work	Role	Result
2004	NAACP Image Award	Outstanding TV News, Talk or Information (Series or Special)	Judge Mathis	Host	Won
2005	NAACP Image Award	Outstanding TV News, Talk or Information (Series or Special)	Judge Mathis	Host	Nominated
2006	NAACP Image Award	Outstanding TV News, Talk or Information (Series or Special)	Judge Mathis	Host	Nominated
2008	NAACP Image Award	Outstanding TV News, Talk or Information (Series or Special)	Judge Mathis	Host	Nominated
2009	NAACP Image Award	Outstanding TV News, Talk or Information (Series or Special)	Judge Mathis	Host	Nominated
2010	NAACP Image Award	Outstanding TV News, Talk or Information (Series or Special)	Judge Mathis	Host	Nominated
2011	NAACP Image Award	Outstanding TV News, Talk or Information (Series or Special)	Judge Mathis	Host	Nominated
2012	NAACP Image Award	Outstanding TV News, Talk or Information (Series or Special)	Judge Mathis	Host	Nominated
2013	NAACP Image Award	Outstanding TV News, Talk or Information (Series or Special)	Judge Mathis	Host	Nominated
2017	Daytime Emmy Award	Outstanding Legal/Courtroom Program	Judge Mathis	Host	Nominated
2018	Daytime Emmy Award	Outstanding Legal/Courtroom Program	Judge Mathis	Host	Won
2019	Daytime Emmy Award	Outstanding Legal/Courtroom Program	Judge Mathis	Host	Nominated
2020	Daytime Emmy Award	Outstanding Legal/Courtroom Program	Judge Mathis	Host	Nominated
2022	Daytime Emmy Award	Outstanding Legal/Courtroom Program	Judge Mathis	Host	Nominated
2023	GLAAD Media Award	Outstanding Reality Program	Mathis Family Matters	Executive Producer/Self	Nominated
2024	NAACP Image Award	Outstanding Television Movie, Limited-Series, or Dramatic Special	First Lady of BMF: The Tonesa Welch Story	Executive Producer	Nominated

== Electoral history ==
1994 Wayne County judicial elections, District 36, 10 seats (Unofficial results)
Candidate	Votes	%
Trudy DunCombe Archer (incumbent)	124,676	10.12%
Donald Coleman (incumbent)	113,711	9.23%
Venesa Jones Bradley (incumbent)	106,698	8.66%
Deborah Lewis Langston (incumbent)	85,893	6.97%
Nancy Allda Farmer (incumbent)	78,536	6.37%
Marylin E. Atkins (incumbent)	78,110	6.34%
C. Lorene Royster (incumbent)	73,406	5.96%
Claudia Lauchie Gartin (incumbent)	72,940	5.92%
Chris E. Stith (incumbent)	72,226	5.86%
Greg Mathis	68,662	5.57%
Vonda R. Evans	61,480	4.99%
Patricia L. Jefferson	59,045	4.79%
John Cozart	53,684	4.36%
Willienard Banks	51,064	4.14%
Salina Nelson	45,375	3.68%
Sherrie C. Ross	45,091	3.66%
Michele LaFlora	41,645	3.38%
Total votes	1,232,242	100.00%

== Bibliography ==
- Mathis, Greg and Blair S. Walker. Inner City Miracle, Ballantine: New York, 2002.
- Mathis, Greg. "Black men must fight back against obstacles." (For Brothers O Ebony (magazine). February 1, 2007. vol: 62:4 p. 38
