= Gangsters: America's Most Evil =

- Created by: Asylum Entertainment
- Starring: Cornell Womack (narrator - 2012-2013) Tim Hopper (narrator - 2016)
- Country of origin: United States
- No. of seasons: 5
- No. of episodes: 40

Production
- Running time: approx. 45–50 minutes

Original release
- Network: Bio
- Release: July 20, 2012

Gangsters: America's Most Evil is a documentary television series that airs on Reelz which profiles notorious criminals whose crimes involve murder, drug trafficking, racketeering, and human trafficking. Most, if not all of, the criminals profiled in this series were either brought to justice by local, state, and federal law enforcement or were killed as a part of their criminal enterprises.

Gangsters debuted on July 20, 2012, on Bio and is produced by Asylum Entertainment in association with A+E Networks (Bio's parent company). Season 4 aired first-run on Reelz and episodes from that season are labeled "Reelz Original" in the closing credits.

== Episode Guide ==
=== Season One ===
Episode	Title	Original Air Date	Synopsis
1	Juan Raul Garza: The First Kingpin	July 20, 2012	Garza was a Brownsville, Texas-based drug dealer who made his fortune shipping and selling narcotics between the United States and Mexico. In 2001, he had the unfortunate distinction of being the first convicted felon to be executed by the federal government in more than 30 years.
2	The Ultimate Outlaw: Harry "Taco" Bowman	July 27, 2012	Bowman was the international president of the Outlaws Motorcycle Club who was eventually convicted of several murders, firearms violations, and other acts of violence. Since 1999, he is currently serving two life sentences in a federal prison in Florida.
3	The Godmother: Griselda Blanco	August 3, 2012	Blanco was a Colombian-born drug baroness who had been involved in a life of crime since her early teens. She made her way to the United States in the mid-1970s, along with her husband and four sons, first settling in New York City, then later moving to South Florida and Southern California. Blanco was also one of the key figures in the infamous Cocaine Cowboy drug wars that plagued the Miami area in late '70s and early '80s. She was arrested by federal authorities in 1985 on drug and murder conviction, and while she was released from prison in 2004, she was deported back to Colombia some time later. Exactly a month after her Gangsters profiles originally aired, Blanco was murdered on September 3 in Medellín, Colombia via a drive-by shooting. She was 69 years old.
4	The Mayor of Harlem: Albert "Alpo" Martinez	August 10, 2012	
5	Machine Gun Johnny: Johnny Eng	August 28, 2012	
6	King Blood: Luis Felipe	September 4, 2012	The New York state chapter founder of the Almighty Latin King & Queens Nation, January 6 in the 1980's. He ran the ALKQN with an iron fist. However, all the power he obtained from his authority spiraled out of control, and he ended up ordering the killings of fellow members. While incarcerated in NYS Prison system in Clinton correctional facility annex, the gang grew due to Hispanics being oppressed by blacks and other gangs, mainly the Bloods Gang.
7	Anthony Shea and The No-Name Gang	September 11, 2012	
8	The Queenpin: Jemeker Thompson	September 18, 2012	
9	Lethal Beauties: Beltran, Henao and Garcia	September 25, 2012	

=== Season Two ===
Episode	Title	Original Air Date	Synopsis
1 (10)	The Black Hand of Death: Clarence "Preacher" Heatley	May 28, 2013	
2 (11)	The Shadow Kingpin: Bartolome Moya	June 4, 2013	
3 (12)	The Pot Princess of Beverly Hills: Lisette Lee	June 11, 2013	
4 (13)	The Mongol Warlord: Ruben "Doc" Cavazos	June 18, 2013	
5 (14)	Philly's Gangster Queen: Thelma Wright	June 25, 2013	
6 (15)	The Colombian Rambo: Carlos Lehder	July 2, 2013	
7 (16)	The Kingston Kingpin: Christopher "Dudus" Coke	July 9, 2013	
8 (17)	The Baron of Brotherhood: Barry Mills	July 16, 2013	

=== Season Three ===
Episode	Title	Original Air Date	Synopsis
1 (18)	Mother of the Avenues: Maria "Chata" Leon	July 23, 2013	Mexican-born Leon and her family terrorize the streets of the Northeast Los Angeles with their ruthless ways of drug-dealing and killing.
2 (19)	Alejandro Corredor	August 20, 2013	
3 (20)	Sex, Money, Murder, Inc.: "Pistol" Pete Rollack	August 27, 2013	Rollack grew up in the South Bronx section of New York City, in a life of crime, as his father was a long-time associate of Harlem drug kingpin Leroy "Nicky" Barnes. The younger Rollack grew up to be a ruthless drug lord who would later branch out his operations to other locales, as such as Pittsburgh and Charlotte. As the co-founder of the Sex Money Murda crew (who would later become an affiliate group of the United Blood Nation), Rollack would order and execute himself revenge killings of rival dealers and a local basketball star, Karlton Hines in 1995, which would eventually find him in trouble with law enforcement. In 1998, "Pistol" Pete would get convicted of drug trafficking and murder, and is currently serving a life sentence without parole, and under solitary confinement, in a federal prison in Colorado.
4 (21)	Los Muchachos: Augusto Falcon & Salvador Magulta		
5 (22)	The Cutt Boys: Terrance Benjamin & Derrick Washington		
6 (23)	Bird And The New Breeds: Dana Bostic		
7 (24)	"Q" The Motor City Connect: Quasand Lewis		

=== Season Four ===
Episode	Title	Original Air Date	Synopsis
1 (25)	Juan Ramon Matta Ballesteros	January 19, 2016	A drug lord with ties to the Medellin Cartel in Colombia and the Guadalajara Cartel in Mexico, Ballasteros was arrested and convicted in connection with the kidnapping, torture and execution of Drug Enforcement Administration agent Enrique "Kiki" Camarena. He is currently serving multiple life sentences and is incarcerated at the United States Penitentiary, Canaan, Pennsylvania.
2 (26)	The Iceman of Iowa: Dustin Honken	January 26, 2016	Honken was a prolific producer of methamphetamine in the U.S. Midwest. In 2005, Honken and his girlfriend, Angela Johnson, were both tried, convicted, and given federal death sentences for the 1993 murders of five people, including two children, in Mason City, Iowa. Two of the victims were cooperating witnesses in a federal investigation against Honken. Johnson's death sentence was vacated on appeal in 2012, and she was re-sentenced in 2014 to life in prison without the possibility of parole. Honken, who was already serving two concurrent 27-year sentences as a result of a 1997 guilty plea in a second federal drug indictment, was executed at the United States Penitentiary, Terre Haute, Indiana on July 17, 2020.
3 (27)	James Spencer Springette	February 2, 2016	Springette was the leader of The Island Boys, a major cocaine trafficking ring supplied by the Medellin Cartel which imported cocaine into the United States via the United States Virgin Islands. Springette was the 471th person to appear on the FBI's Ten Most Wanted List. He was indicted in 1998 and arrested in Colombia, but he escaped from prison while awaiting extradition. Captured in Venezuela in 2002 and extradited to the United States, Springette pled guilty to conspiracy and money laundering and was sentenced in 2005 to 35 years in federal prison. In 2015, Springette cooperated with the government and testified for the prosecution in the trial of another suspected drug importer in the British Virgin Islands (Violet "Letty" Hodge), and his federal prison sentence was halved. Springette is currently incarcerated at the Federal Correctional Institution, Herlong, California and is scheduled to be released from federal custody in 2019.
4 (28)	Ludwig Fainberg	February 9, 2016	Fainberg worked as a go-between with the Russian Mafia and the Medellin Cartel in Colombia. Convicted of federal drug charges, he cooperated with the government and received the minimum sentence for which he was eligible: three years imprisonment. He was released from federal custody in 1999 and deported to Israel. Later, he moved to Canada, where he was arrested in a sex trafficking ring. He was again deported to Israel in 2003.
5 (29)	Demetrius & Terry Flenory (BMF)	February 16, 2016	Leaders of the Black Mafia Family, Demetrius "Big Meech" Flenory and his brother, Terry "Southwest T" Flenory, pled guilty to running a multimillion-dollar drug distribution ring based in Atlanta, Georgia. Both brothers were sentenced to 30 years in federal prison. Demetrius is currently incarcerated at the United States Penitentiary, Lompoc, California; Terry was released on May 5, 2020.
6 (30)	Alex Rudaj: Patriarch of the Sixth Family	February 23, 2016	Alex Rudaj was the leader of the Rudaj Organization, a faction of the Albanian mafia in New York City. Specializing in illegal gambling, extortion and loansharking, the group also known as The Corporation was large enough at one point to be considered a Sixth Family. Rudaj even sought to occupy the table formerly reserved for Gambino crime family boss John Gotti at the Italian restaurant Rao's. In 2006, Rudaj was convicted of racketeering and related charges and sentenced to 27 years in federal prison. Rudaj is currently incarcerated at the Federal Correctional Institution, Fort Dix, New Jersey.
7 (31)	Best Friends Gang	March 1, 2016	Founded by four brothers in Detroit, the Best Friends gang served as enforcers for other factions before getting into the drug trade themselves. A violent turf war between the gang and former associates Demetrius Holloway and Richard "Maserati Rick" Carter leaves the streets of Detroit awash in blood. The only surviving brother, Reginald "Rockin' Reggie" Brown, had a murder conviction overturned in 1992 but was re-arrested in 1993 for the murders of four people, including a three-year-old girl hit by a stray bullet, and given four life sentences. Brown is currently incarcerated at the Kinross Correctional Facility in Michigan.
8 (32)	Rances Ulices Amaya	March 8, 2016	"Blue" was the leader of the Guanacos Lokotes Salvatruchas faction of MS-13 and oversaw a large prostitution and human trafficking operation in northern Virginia on behalf of the gang. He was convicted in 2012 of conspiracy and three counts of sex trafficking and sentenced to 50 years in federal prison. Amaya is currently incarcerated at the United States Penitentiary, Tucson, Arizona.
9 (33)	Mery Valencia	March 15, 2016	Mery Valencia, also known as La Señora, was one of, if not the, highest ranking women in the Cali Cartel. After being arrested in Brazil in 1997, Valencia was extradited to the United States the following year and was convicted in 1999 of conspiracy and sentenced to life in prison.
10 (34)	Cheng Chui Ping	March 22, 2016	"Sister Ping" was the leader of what is considered one of the most prolific human trafficking operations in U.S. history. Known as the "Queen of the Snakeheads," Ping oversaw the smuggling of thousands of individuals mainly from China's Fujian Province into New York's Chinatown. Ping fled the United States after the freighter Golden Venture, carrying almost 300 Chinese immigrants, ran aground off the coast of New York City. Ping was captured in Hong Kong in 2000 and extradited to the United States. She was convicted in 2006 of conspiracy to commit alien smuggling, money laundering and trafficking in ransom proceeds and sentenced to 35 years in federal prison. On April 25, 2014, Ping, aged 65, died of pancreatic cancer while incarcerated at the Federal Medical Center, Carswell, Texas.

=== Season Five ===
Episode	Title	Original Air Date	Synopsis
1 (35)	James "Whitey" Bulger	December 6, 2016	
2 (36)	The Monster of Atwater Village: Timothy McGhee	December 13, 2016	Known as the Monster of Atwater Village, McGhee was a high-ranking member of the Toonerville Rifa 13 gang in Los Angeles County, California who was implicated in at least 12 homicides. In 2007, McGhee was found guilty of three counts of murder in the shooting deaths of two rival gang members and the girlfriend of another, two counts of attempted murder in the shootings of a fourth rival gang member and a passenger in the same car and two counts of attempted murder of a police officer in the ambush shootings of two Los Angeles Police Department officers in 2000. After the jury could not agree on a sentence, a second jury sentenced McGhee to death in 2008 for the murders plus multiple life sentences for the other charges. McGhee is currently on death row at San Quentin State Prison in California and is awaiting execution.
3 (37)	The Hit Man of Motown: Vincent Smothers	December 20, 2016	"Vito" was one of the most prolific hired killers in Detroit. Admitting to being paid over $60,000 over a two-year period for his actions on the street, Smothers was suspected of killing so many people that he told investigators that he did not even remember the names of some of his victims. In 2010, as part of a plea agreement, Smothers pled guilty to eight counts of second-degree murder in the deaths of seven drug dealers and the estranged wife of a Detroit Police Department officer, which was reportedly committed for as little as $1,500. Smothers was sentenced to 52–100 years in prison and is currently incarcerated at the Macomb Correctional Facility in Michigan.
4 (38)	The Madam of Malice: Raquel Hortencia Medeles-Arguello	December 27, 2016	
5 (39)	Marvin and Pierre Mercado	January 3, 2017	
6 (40)	Ross William Ulbricht	January 10, 2017	

=== Season Six ===
Episode	Title	Original Air Date	Synopsis
1 (41)			
2 (42)	The Black Widow Perrion Roberts	April 19, 2022	Roberts is a model turned queenpin with a hot temper and ties to the Mexican drug cartels.
3 (43)	Shauntay Henderson: Most Wanted	April 19, 2022	Henderson is a convicted murderer who was captured by the FBI after 24 hours of being on the FBI's Ten Most Wanted Fugitive list.
4 (44)	El Chapo Joaquin Guzman	April 26, 2022	Guzman is a Mexican drug loard and former leader of the Sinaloa drug cartel. The DEA considered him "the godfather of the drug world."
5 (45)	“La Barbie” Edgar Villareal	April 26, 2022	Villarreal, also known as “La Barbie” because of his white skin and blue eyes, likening him to a Barbie “Ken” Doll, was a high-flying drug lord and a high-ranking lieutenant of the Beltran-Leyva Cartel.
