= Oregon Psilocybin Society =

American non-profit organization

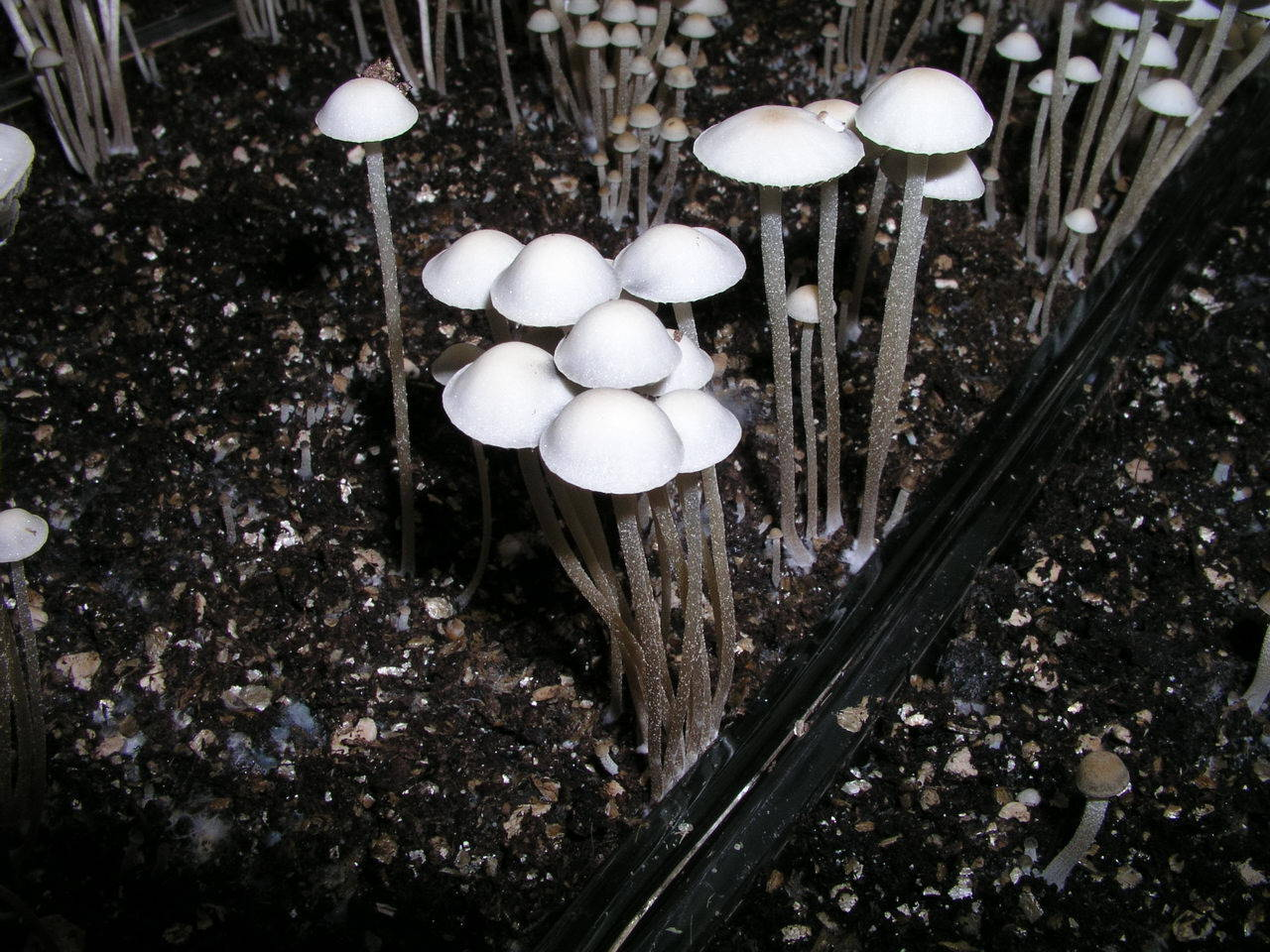
Panaeolus cambodginiensis grown in trays

Oregon Psilocybin Society is a nonprofit organization founded in 2016 with the direct intention of creating awareness around and laying a foundation for the legislation of psilocybin services, a sequence of supervised sessions which includes the use of psychedelic psilocybin mushrooms for adults in the U.S. state of Oregon. The founders of the society, Sheri Eckert and Tom Eckert, are the Architects and Chief Petitioners of Measure 109, Introducing an initiative to Oregon state voters for 2020. This legislation will create legal access to psilocybin assisted services to any individual over 21 years of age, upon passing a risk assessment for contraindications. Psilocybin assisted services will be provided on-site at a licensed facility by a licensed facilitator. The service progression would include, at minimum, a preparation session, a psilocybin administration session, and an integration session. All sessions would be conducted by trained facilitators.

The "Psilocybin Service Initiative" was originally submitted to Oregon's Office of Legislative Counsel in January 2017. It was revised in 2019 and approved by Oregon's Secretary of State. In June 2020, the initiative, despite the COVID-19 pandemic, gathered enough signatures to qualify for Oregon's November 2020 election. Oregon passed ballot Measure 109 in November 2020, which legalizes psilocybin in supervised and licensed therapy sessions for those aged 21-years-old and over and passed Measure 110 decriminalizing the possession and personal use of all drugs.
