= Mathis Court with Judge Mathis =

American court show

- Genre: Court show
- Presented by: Judge Greg Mathis
- Narrated by: Curt Chaplin
- Country of origin: United States
- No. of seasons: 3
- No. of episodes: 255

Production
- Camera setup: Multiple
- Running time: 30 minutes
- Production company: Allen Media Group

Original release
- Network: Syndication
- Release: September 11, 2023 – present

Mathis Court with Judge Mathis is an American court show presided over by Judge Greg Mathis, a former judge of Michigan's 36th District Court. Mathis, a motivational speaker and activist/advocate for Black-interests, often takes time on his show to defy social stereotypes made towards African-Americans by showcasing African-Americans involved in events such as taking care of children.

The series began on September 11, 2023, on Justice Central after the cancellation of its predecessor show, Judge Mathis, in early 2023. On May 5, 2025, Mathis Court with Judge Mathis was renewed for two more seasons, taking the show through the 2026–2027 television season.
