= Mery Valencia =

Colombian drug trafficker

- Born: Mery Valencia de Ortiz; August 28, 1953 (age 73); Cali, Valle del Cauca, Colombia
- Other name: La Señora

Criminal activity
- Organization: Cali Cartel
- Conviction(s): Drug trafficking, money launder
- Penalty: Life imprisonment (1999)
- Incarcerated: FCI Tallahassee
- Status: Released (2012)

Mery Valencia de Ortiz (born August 28, 1953), also known as "La Señora", is a former Colombian drug trafficker who led a narcotics operation based on Miami and was one of the leaders of the Cali Cartel. Between 1997 and 1998, Valencia's organization made more than $180 million annually and distributed more than 12,000 kilograms (26,500 lb) of cocaine.

== Biography ==
Valencia was born in Trujillo, Colombia. She had multiple contacts with drug traffickers and became associated with the Cali Cartel, later moving to Miami in the 1970s. In the 1980s, she began a mass distribution of cocaine and heroin across the United States. Many of her family members were involved in drug trafficking and Valencia owned hair salons and beauty parlors as a front for her drug trafficking organization. She maintained a vast network of cash houses and kept ledger books, recording all members of her organization. She later became a naturalized American citizen.

On February 7, 1997, FBI agents and Brazilian authorities arrested Valencia at the airport in Rio de Janeiro. She had undergone extensive plastic surgery to alter her appearance and carried 13 passports with false names. After the Brazilian Supreme Court rejected the appeal to block extradition, Valencia was extradited to the United States and imprisoned in New York to await trial at the Manhattan Federal Court. On July 30, 1999, Valencia was convicted on drug trafficking charges and sentenced to life imprisonment.

In 2012, Valencia was released from the Federal Correctional Institution in Tallahassee. Her current whereabouts are unknown, though is speculated that she returned to Colombia.

== See also ==
- Griselda Blanco, another female Colombian drug trafficker based out of Miami
- Cali Cartel
