= Women in the drug economy in the United States =

Female incarceration in the United States

In the United States, women represent roughly a quarter of all arrests. Women and men are both more likely to be arrested for less serious property crimes, but men are more likely than women to be involved in violent crime. Since 1960, while arrests in total have decreased, women have become a higher percentage of those arrests, partly due to an increase in drug-related arrests. Steffensmeier and Schwartz (2008) claim that this increase is not because more women are committing substance-abuse offenses, but because law enforcement officials have begun using broader, more expansive definitions of crimes, arresting more people for minor crimes. Because women are more likely to commit these minor crimes, females have been disproportionately added to the number of arrests.

== Women and the war on drugs ==
In the late 1960s, recreational drug use among the middle-class increased as it became more socially mainstream. It was associated with countercultural movements and social and political unrest. In 1970, the Congress passed the Controlled Substances Act, which regulated and penalized drug use according to five different “schedules”. Each recreational drug was assigned a schedule based on its potential for addiction and abuse, its acceptable medical uses, and its safety profile. Each schedule carried different levels of penalties for use, possession, or distribution of a drug – Schedule I had the harshest penalties, while Schedule V had the most lenient ones.

The war on drugs and public anti-drug sentiment reached a peak when Ronald Reagan became president in 1981 and First Lady Nancy Reagan started her “Just Say No” anti-drug campaign targeted at middle-class children and adolescents. Simultaneously, the advent of crack cocaine in New York City severely impacted inner-city areas and increased the public's political opposition to drug use. Reagan also signed the Anti-Drug Abuse Act of 1986, which imposed mandatory minimum sentences, removing discretion from judges when sentencing drug offenders.

Dana Britton in 2011 and Steffensmeier and Schwartz in 2008 conclude the war on drugs has created a disproportionately large impact on women, especially on women of color, because of an increase in the severity and frequency of minor crime- and drug-related arrests and the fact that women are more likely than men are to commit non-serious crimes.

Bloom, Owen and Covington (2004) additionally state that the majority of women offenders are poor, undereducated, and underemployed, hurting their chances of desisting properly and increasing their risk of recidivism after leaving prison. Around 60% of women in state and federal prisons are mothers of minor children; the effect of the war on drugs has been not only to disproportionately impact the women themselves, but also to impact their children, the next generation. In addition, as Britton and Beckett, Nyrop, and Pfingst point out, Hispanic and African-American women are overrepresented in the population of women involved in the criminal justice system.

The advent of crack cocaine, a cheaper version of cocaine that could be smoked, in American inner-city neighborhoods in the 1980s coincided with rampant deindustrialization, increasing unemployment rates, and an increasing number of female heads-of-households. The advent of crack also came at the same time as the peak of the war on drugs and its increasingly more punitive laws and focus on defunding welfare programs. Because of this, as well as the cheaper price of crack, women's drug use rates went up. Ryder and Brisgone interview a group of mothers who grew up during this “Crack Era” in the 1990s to find out how they and their children were affected by the war on drugs and crack.

They find that the mothers’ heavy use of drugs during this era heavily influenced their children to try drugs. Additionally, many women were pressured or chose to perform sex work in order to support their “urgent need for drugs”. The authors of this study found that the mothers’ addiction further forced them to spend less time with their families, disrupting ties between mother and child, although they did love their children and wanted to spend time with them when they could.

== Women's participation in the drug economy ==
=== Women and the informal economy ===
The informal economy is a sector of the economy that includes “all criminal activity that is income generating”. In the United States, this means that the selling and consumption of drugs is part of the informal economy. Throughout the world, working women are more likely to work in the informal sector, partly because their traditional household and childcare responsibilities may make it preferable to work from home. Others believe that women are “forced” into the informal sector because the formal sector fails to accommodate gender-specific needs for women, such as paid maternity leave.

Since the 1980s, cheaper imports have been competing for domestically manufactured goods in the United States, leading to deindustrialization, particularly in urban areas. This has caused unemployment in the formal sector. Furthermore, a decrease in welfare policies has also encouraged unemployment. Both of these factors have led to a growth in the informal sector of the U.S. economy, raising the number of women who work in this sector. This has caused an influx of women into drug markets.

=== The drug economy as an equalizer ===
The presence of women in drug markets has prompted sociologists, criminologists, and anthropologists to discuss the role of women in these markets. Do they hold positions in the drug economy that are liberated from mainstream society's gender inequality, or does society's sexism reproduce itself in the drug economy?

Anthropologist Phillippe Bourgois, in an ethnography of the crack market in Spanish Harlem, states that the presence of women on the streets and in the crack market illustrates their emancipation from household labor and childcare. They are free to participate in street life. According to Natasha Du Rose, Wilson (1993) makes the argument that women's crime and drug use are rising to match men's because of women's emancipation. Du Rose quotes Fagan as saying that women's positions in the drug economy are high-status enough that prostitution plays a “relatively insignificant” part in generating income for these women.

=== The drug economy perpetuating inequalities ===
While Bourgois in 1989 states that women are free to take part in the drug trade now that they have been liberated from being wives and mothers, he qualifies this by saying that “traditional gender relations still govern income-generating strategies in the underground economy”. His ethnographic research shows that the majority of women in the Spanish Harlem crack market become sex workers to support their addictions. While women participate more in the drug economy, they still are forced into traditional street roles when they need to generate income.

Sociologists Lisa Maher and Kathleen Daly in 1996 performed an ethnographic study of women in the Bushwick drug market in Brooklyn. They used a combination of participant observation fieldwork and interviews with the women and found that, in a highly hierarchical drug market, women occupy the lowest rungs of the market. “Owners”, who all happen to be men, employ “managers” who control a number of regular and casual “sellers”. These sellers in turn employ “runners”, “steerers”, and “coppers”, who supply the sellers, advertise their brand of drugs, or buy drugs for other customers. The runners, steerers, coppers, and casual sellers occupy the lowest-power and lowest-income positions of this market, and have the most women participants. The upper levels of the hierarchy have only men participants. In this study, Maher and Daly refute the idea that the emergence of the crack economy has afforded emancipation and opportunity for women; gender inequality has continued to be a presence even in the informal economy. The only change Maher and Daly found brought by women's liberation appears to be a decrease in the number of women relying on male boyfriends or husbands to sell drugs.

Lisa Maher continues her research on the Bushwick drug economy in her 1997 book Sexed Work. She reiterates her findings with Daly on the low-income, low-power participation of women in the drug market, but she also focuses on the sex work women more commonly perform to generate income. Since the influx of cheap crack into the market, Maher finds out that more women have been induced to participate in street-level prostitution, driving up competition and driving down prices, further disadvantaging the women, especially low-income women of color who typically do not attract high-paying clients anyway. Furthermore, while the influx of crack lowered prices significantly, Maher's book does not support the idea that women frequently exchange sex directly for drugs.

=== Women's strategies for coping with inequalities ===
Although women can be disadvantaged in the drug economy, they find ways to cope with these inequalities. In Sexed Work, Lisa Maher states that some women adopt a “badass” or a “crazy” persona in order to survive amongst violent male counterparts. Maher and Susan L. Hudson, in a literature review of the women in the drug economy, explain that women are able to use their image as “feminine”, “vulnerable”, or "innocent" to hide from police suspicions and sell drugs successfully. They also may be able to use their “feminine” social and communication skills to defuse potentially violent situations. Maher and Hudson also find that many women can cope with limited opportunities for generating income in the drug economy by “diversifying”: they make money through a flexible mix of sex work, welfare, formal sector jobs, and drug selling.
