= List of Oprah Prime episodes =

Oprah Prime is an American primetime television series hosted and produced by Oprah Winfrey, airing on OWN. It was originally called Oprah's Next Chapter up until season 3 when it was renamed to Oprah Prime.

== Overview ==
Season	Episodes	Originally released	
Season	Episodes	First released	Last released
1	29	January 1, 2012	July 15, 2012
2	47	July 22, 2012	December 8, 2013
3	9	March 9, 2014	January 4, 2015

== Episodes ==
=== Season 1 (2012) ===
The first season of Oprah Prime premiered on January 1, 2012, and ran for 29 episodes.

No. overall	No. in season	Title	Location	Original release date	U.S. viewers (millions)
1	1	Steven Tyler - Part I	Sunapee, New Hampshire	January 1, 2012	0.98
2	2	Steven Tyler - Part II	Sunapee, New Hampshire	January 1, 2012	1.2
3	3	Pastor Joel Osteen	Houston, Texas	January 8, 2012	1.55
4	4	Governor Chris Christie	Mendham, New Jersey	January 15, 2012	0.50
5	5	George Lucas	Skywalker Ranch, Nicasio, California	January 22, 2012	0.55
6	6	Haiti - Part I: Sean Penn in Haiti	Port-au-Prince, Haiti	January 29, 2012	0.49
7	7	Haiti - Part II: Hope in Haiti	Port-au-Prince, Haiti	January 30, 2012	0.25
8	8	America's Hidden Culture - Part I	Brooklyn, New York	February 12, 2012	0.35
9	9	America's Hidden Culture - Part II	Brooklyn, New York	February 13, 2012	0.44
10	10	Tony Robbins	Los Angeles, California	February 19, 2012	0.51
11	11	Paula Deen	Savannah, Georgia	March 4, 2012	0.75
12	12	Whitney Houston's Family	Atlanta, Georgia	March 11, 2012	3.50
13	13	Lady Gaga and Her Mother, Cynthia	Harvard University & New York, New York	March 18, 2012	0.80
14	14	America's Most Unusual Town	Fairfield, Iowa	March 25, 2012	0.40
15	15	Oprah Goes Behind Bars: Shaquan Duley	Orangeburg, South Carolina	April 1, 2012	0.49
16	16	Bishop T.D. Jakes	The Potter's House Church, Dallas, Texas	April 8, 2012	0.76
17	17	Gloria Steinem	Barnard College, New York, New York	April 15, 2012	0.38
18	18	India - Part I: Oprah Travels to India	Mumbai, Maharashtra, India	April 22, 2012	0.50
19	19	India - Part II: Women of India	Vrindavan & Agra, Uttar Pradesh, India	April 29, 2012	0.55
20	20	Carrie Underwood and Husband Mike Fisher: Their First Interview Together	Nashville, Tennessee	May 20, 2012	0.56
21	21	Mayor Cory Booker	Newark, New Jersey	May 27, 2012	0.25
22	22	At Home With Neil Patrick Harris, His Fiancé, David Burtka, and Their Twins	Los Angeles, California	June 3, 2012	0.61
23	23	Paris Jackson and 50 Cent - Part I	Hidden Hills, California & Queens, New York	June 10, 2012	0.91
24	24	50 Cent - Part II	Queens, New York	June 17, 2012	0.71
25	25	The Kardashians - Part I	Hidden Hills, California	June 17, 2012	1.11
26	26	The Kardashians - Part II	Hidden Hills, California	June 24, 2012	1.20
27	27	Miami Heat Stars — Part I	Miami, Florida	July 1, 2012	0.39
28	28	Miami Heat Stars — Part II	Miami, Florida	July 8, 2012	0.47
29	29	David Copperfield	Exuma, Bahamas	July 15, 2012	0.43

=== Season 2 (2012–13) ===
The second season of Oprah Prime premiered on July 22, 2012.

No. overall	No. in season	Title	Location	Original release date	U.S. viewers (millions)
30	1	Oprah Salutes Superstar Olympians	Montecito, California	July 22, 2012	0.30
31	2	Rihanna	Saint Michael, Barbados	August 19, 2012	2.50
32	3	Olympic Gold-Medalist Gabrielle Douglas	West Des Moines, Iowa	August 26, 2012	0.93
33	4	Kelsey Grammer	Beverly Hills, California	August 26, 2012	0.86
34	5	Jennifer Hudson	Chicago, Illinois	September 9, 2012	0.66
35	6	Usher	Atlanta, Georgia	September 16, 2012	1.52
36	7	Stephen Colbert	Charleston, South Carolina	September 30, 2012	0.40
37	8	Invisible Children's Jason Russell	San Diego, California	October 7, 2012	0.37
38	9	Fergie	Solvang, California	October 21, 2012	0.58
39	10	Bette Midler & Valerie Simpson	New York, New York	November 11, 2012	0.57
40	11	Justin Bieber	Chicago, Illinois	November 25, 2012	0.42
41	12	Steven Spielberg, Daniel Day-Lewis & Sally Field	Los Angeles, California	December 2, 2012	0.46
42	13	Kerry Washington & Shonda Rhimes	Los Angeles, California	December 9, 2012	0.43
43	14	Jamie Foxx - Part I	New York, New York	December 16, 2012	0.48
44	15	Jamie Foxx - Part II	New York, New York	December 23, 2012	0.54
45	16	David Letterman	Ball State University, Muncie, Indiana	January 6, 2013	0.71
46	17	Lance Armstrong - Part I	Austin, Texas	January 17, 2013	3.18
47	18	Lance Armstrong - Part II	Austin, Texas	January 18, 2013	1.78
48	19	Drew Barrymore	Montecito, California	January 20, 2013	0.41
49	20	LL Cool J	Los Angeles, California	January 27, 2013	0.64
50	21	Cissy Houston	Newark, New Jersey	January 28, 2013	0.70
51	22	Beyoncé	New York, New York	February 16, 2013	1.31
52	23	The Wayans Family	Los Angeles, California	March 3, 2013	0.59
53	24	Chelsea Handler	Bel Air, Los Angeles, California	March 10, 2013	0.53
54	25	John of God	Abadiânia, Goiás, Brazil	March 17, 2013	0.33
55	26	Sheryl Sandberg and Justice Sonia Sotomayor	Silicon Valley & The Bronx, New York	March 24, 2013	0.38
56	27	Jane Fonda and Her Daughter, Mary Williams	Beverly Hills, California	April 7, 2013	0.47
57	28	Mark Burnett and Roma Downey Discuss The Bible	Malibu, California	April 14, 2013	0.46
58	29	First Openly Gay NBA Player Jason Collins and His Family	Beverly Hills, California	May 5, 2013	0.56
59	30	Tyler Perry	Beverly Hills, California	May 26, 2013	0.69
60	31	Oprah Visits the Set of The Voice	Culver City, California	June 2, 2013	0.73
61	32	John Legend and Fiancee Chrissy Teigen	Hollywood Hills West, Los Angeles	June 9, 2013	0.53
62	33	African American Women in Hollywood with Alfre Woodard, Viola Davis, Phylicia Rashad and Gabrielle Union	Santa Barbara, California	June 23, 2013	1.00
63	34	Hugh Jackman	New York, New York	July 28, 2013	0.39
64	35	Gloria Estefan	Vero Beach, Florida	August 4, 2013	0.42
65	36	Lee Daniels' The Butler	New York, New York	August 11, 2013	0.63
66	37	Lindsay Lohan	New York, New York	August 18, 2013	0.89
67	38	Tina Turner	Nice, South of France	August 25, 2013	1.03
68	39	Robin Thicke	Chicago, Illinois	October 13, 2013	N/A
69	40	Arsenio Hall	The Comedy Store	October 20, 2013	N/A
70	41	Gay Hollywood with Wanda Sykes, Jesse Tyler Ferguson and Dan Bucatinsky	Hollywood	October 27, 2013	N/A
71	42	Patti LaBelle	Apollo Theater	November 3, 2013	1.00
72	43	Spike Lee	Brooklyn, New York	November 10, 2013	N/A
73	44	Reverend Al Sharpton	Los Angeles, California	November 17, 2013	N/A
74	45	Kenny "Babyface" Edmonds	Los Angeles, California	November 24, 2013	N/A
75	46	Earvin "Magic" and Cookie Johnson	Los Angeles, California	December 1, 2013	N/A
76	47	Powerhouse Performances with Idris Elba, Chiwetel Ejiofor, Michael B. Jordan	Los Angeles, California	December 8, 2013	N/A

=== Season 3 (2014–15) ===
No. overall	No. in season	Title	Original release date	U.S. viewers (millions)
77	1	Russell Brand and Heroin Addiction	March 9, 2014	N/A
78	2	Cameron Diaz and Sharon Stone: Aging Gracefully in Hollywood	March 16, 2014	N/A
79	3	Kevin Hart	March 23, 2014	N/A
80	4	Rob Lowe	April 6, 2014	N/A
81	5	Pharrell Williams	April 13, 2014	N/A
82	6	The Worldwide Television Exclusive: Matthew Sandusky	July 17, 2014	N/A
83	7	Iyanla, I'll Fix Your House	November 29, 2014	N/A
84	8	Michael Sam	December 27, 2014	N/A
85	9	Celebrating Dr. King and The Selma Marches 50 Years Later	January 4, 2015	N/A
