= List of Oprah's Lifeclass episodes =

Oprah's Lifeclass is an American primetime self-help talk show hosted and produced by Oprah Winfrey, airing on OWN: Oprah Winfrey Network.

== Series overview ==
| Season | Episodes | Originally aired | |
| Season | Episodes | First aired | Last aired |
|---|---|---|---|
| 1 | 25 | October 10, 2011 | November 11, 2011 |
| 2 | 6 | March 26, 2012 | April 30, 2012 |
| 3 | 7 | July 29, 2012 | January 13, 2013 |
| 4 | 14 | February 10, 2013 | October 6, 2013 |
| 5 | 11 | January 3, 2014 | September 28, 2014 |

== Episodes ==
=== Season 1 Classes (2011) ===
Season One of Oprah's Lifeclass aired on OWN: Oprah Winfrey Network from Monday October 10 until Friday November 11, 2011. The first season of Lifeclass aired Monday-Friday at 8/7c, following The Rosie Show, and the pair was considered a reboot for the struggling network to increase viewership during its fall launch of shows. Season One consists of twenty-five hour-long episodes hosted by Winfrey, and nine 90-minute webcasts hosted by Winfrey and a guest teacher (some of which aired as Oprah's Lifeclass LIVE episodes, following Lifeclass on Friday nights).

| No. in series | No. in season | Original air date | Lifeclass Lesson | Lifeclass Teacher | U.S. Viewers (millions) |
|---|---|---|---|---|---|
| 1 | 1 | October 10, 2011 | The False Power of the Ego | Eckhart Tolle | 0.330 |
| 2 | 2 | October 11, 2011 | Letting Go of Anger | Iyanla Vanzant | 0.279 |
| 3 | 3 | October 12, 2011 | You Become What You Believe | Cheryl Richardson | N/A |
| 4 | 4 | October 13, 2011 | The Truth Will Set You Free | Martha Beck | N/A |
| 5 | 5 | October 14, 2011 | Joy Rising: The Car Giveaway | Iyanla Vanzant | N/A |
| 6 | 6 | October 17, 2011 | Everybody Has a Calling | Oprah Winfrey | N/A |
| 7 | 7 | October 18, 2011 | Aging Beautifully | Oprah Winfrey | N/A |
| 8 | 8 | October 19, 2011 | When You Know Better... | Oprah Winfrey | N/A |
| 9 | 9 | October 20, 2011 | You're Responsible for Your Life | Oprah Winfrey | N/A |
| 10 | 10 | October 21, 2011 | Joy Rising: Flash Mob | Iyanla Vanzant | Lifeclass: 0.245 Lifeclass LIVE: 0.343 |
| 11 | 11 | October 24, 2011 | Your Life Speaks to You in a Whisper | Oprah Winfrey | 0.302 |
| 12 | 12 | October 25, 2011 | Holding On to the Past | Oprah Winfrey | 0.308 |
| 13 | 13 | October 26, 2011 | When People Show You Who They Are, Believe Them | Oprah Winfrey | N/A |
| 14 | 14 | October 27, 2011 | What Animals Can Teach Us | Oprah Winfrey | 0.361 |
| 15 | 15 | October 28, 2011 | Joy Rising: Australia | Iyanla Vanzant | Lifeclass: 0.181 Lifeclass LIVE: 0.161 |
| 16 | 16 | October 31, 2011 | Following Your Gut | Oprah Winfrey | 0.241 |
| 17 | 17 | November 1, 2011 | You Can Rise from the Ashes of Your Life | Oprah Winfrey | 0.289 |
| 18 | 18 | November 2, 2011 | Do Your Eyes Light Up When Your Child Walks in the Room? | Oprah Winfrey | N/A |
| 19 | 19 | November 3, 2011 | Step Out of the Box | Oprah Winfrey | 0.276 |
| 20 | 20 | November 4, 2011 | Joy Rising: Surprise | Iyanla Vanzant | Lifeclass: 0.227 Lifeclass LIVE: 0.167 |
| 21 | 21 | November 7, 2011 | Love Doesn't Hurt | Oprah Winfrey | 0.203 |
| 22 | 22 | November 8, 2011 | Plague of America | Oprah Winfrey | 0.239 |
| 23 | 23 | November 9, 2011 | Slow Down | Oprah Winfrey | N/A |
| 24 | 24 | November 10, 2011 | Newton's Third Law | Tom Shadyac | 0.209 |
| 25 | 25 | November 11, 2011 | You've Always Had the Power | Iyanla Vanzant | Lifeclass: 0.200 Lifeclass LIVE: 0.252 |

=== Season 2 Classes (2012)- Oprah's Lifeclass: The Tour ===
Season Two of Oprah's Lifeclass aired weekly on OWN: Oprah Winfrey Network from Monday March 26 until Monday April 30, 2012. Winfrey hosted class discussions in various cities across North America, in an effort to better connect with the show's audience. Winfrey made tour stops in St. Louis, Missouri, New York City, New York, and Toronto, Ontario. The second season aired Mondays at 8/7c and consists of six two-hour episodes.

| No. in series | No. in season | Original air date | Lifeclass Lesson | Lifeclass Teacher(s) | U.S. Viewers (millions) |
|---|---|---|---|---|---|
| 26 | 1 | March 26, 2012 | Stopping the Pain | Iyanla Vanzant | 0.258 |
| 27 | 2 | April 2, 2012 | Living Fearlessly | Tony Robbins | 0.243 |
| 28 | 3 | April 9, 2012 | Live with Purpose | Bishop T.D. Jakes | 0.481 |
| 29 | 4 | April 16, 2012 | The Power of Forgiveness | Iyanla Vanzant, Tony Robbins, Bishop T.D. Jakes, Deepak Chopra | N/A |
| 30 | 5 | April 23, 2012 | Spiritual Solutions | Deepak Chopra | 0.250 |
| 31 | 6 | April 30, 2012 | Mastering the Art of Gratitude | Iyanla Vanzant, Tony Robbins, Bishop T.D. Jakes, Deepak Chopra | 0.260 |

=== Season 3 Classes (2012-13) ===
Season Three of Oprah's Lifeclass premiered on OWN: Oprah Winfrey Network on Sunday July 29, 2012 at 10/9c. It features Winfrey hosting classes in front of a live studio audience at Harpo Studios in Chicago with various guest co-hosts. Some episodes of season three were filmed at The Hobby Center for the Performing Arts in Sarofim Hall in Houston, Texas on October 5, 2012 with Joel Osteen and Rick Warren. The third season aired Sundays at 9/8c or 10/9c and consists of seven hour-long episodes.

| No. in series | No. in season | Original air date | Lifeclass Lesson | Lifeclass Teacher | U.S. Viewers (millions) |
|---|---|---|---|---|---|
| 32 | 1 | July 29, 2012 | Growing Beyond Guilt | Iyanla Vanzant | 0.281 |
| 33 | 2 | August 5, 2012 | Hard Conversations | Iyanla Vanzant | 0.317 |
| 34 | 3 | September 2, 2012 | Terrible Things Women Do to Each Other | Iyanla Vanzant | 0.450 |
| 35 | 4 | September 23, 2012 | Destructive Family Secrets | Iyanla Vanzant | 0.399 |
| 36 | 5 | October 28, 2012 | I Am: Life is How You See It | Joel Osteen | 0.612 |
| 37 | 6 | November 4, 2012 | Dream Big: What Is the Dream You Hold for Yourself? | Joel Osteen | 0.290 |
| 38 | 7 | January 13, 2013 | Winning the Hand You're Dealt | Rick Warren | 0.473 |

=== Season 4 Classes (2013) ===
Season Four of Oprah's Lifeclass premiered on OWN: Oprah Winfrey Network on Sunday February 10, 2013 at 9/8c. It features Winfrey hosting classes in front of a live studio audience at Harpo Studios in Chicago with various guest co-hosts, including Lifeclass mainstay Iyanla Vanzant, Gary Chapman, Brené Brown, and Dr. Phil. An episode featuring Bishop T.D. Jakes teaching a lesson about fatherless sons and daughters filmed in Texas in late August.

| No. in series | No. in season | Original air date | Lifeclass Lesson | Lifeclass Teacher | U.S. Viewers (millions) |
|---|---|---|---|---|---|
| 39 | 1 | February 10, 2013 | The Five Love Languages | Gary Chapman | 0.101 |
| 40 | 2 | February 24, 2013 | The Purpose Driven Life | Rick Warren | 0.207 |
| 41 | 3 | April 28, 2013 | How to Spot and Stop the Bad Guys in Your Life | Dr. Phil | 0.433 |
| 42 | 4 | May 5, 2013 | Fatherless Sons, Part I | Iyanla Vanzant | 0.570 |
| 43 | 5 | May 5, 2013 | Fatherless Sons, Part II | Iyanla Vanzant | 0.570 |
| 44 | 6 | May 12, 2013 | The Secret Pain of Single Mothers | Iyanla Vanzant | 0.351 |
| 45 | 7 | May 19, 2013 | How to Play Big and Be the Star in Your Own Life | Dr. Phil | 0.169 |
| 46 | 8 | July 7, 2013 | Fatherless Sons: The Reaction | Iyanla Vanzant | 0.407 |
| 47 | 9 | July 14, 2013 | Daddyless Daughters, Part I | Iyanla Vanzant | 0.449 |
| 48 | 10 | July 21, 2013 | Daddyless Daughters, Part II | Iyanla Vanzant | 0.419 |
| 49 | 11 | September 8, 2013 | Fatherless America | Bishop T.D. Jakes | 0.687 |
| 50 | 12 | September 15, 2013 | Reconnecting with Family | Bishop T.D. Jakes | 0.708 |
| 51 | 13 | September 22, 2013 | Vulnerability and Daring Greatly | Brené Brown | N/A |
| 52 | 14 | October 6, 2013 | Living Bravely | Brené Brown | N/A |

=== Season 5 Classes (2014) ===
Season Five of Oprah's Lifeclass premiered on OWN: Oprah Winfrey Network on Friday January 3, 2014 at 10/9c. It features Winfrey hosting classes in front of a live studio audience in "The Social Lab" at Harpo Studios in Chicago with various guest co-hosts.

| No. in series | No. in season | Original air date | Lifeclass Lesson | Lifeclass Teacher | U.S. Viewers (millions) |
|---|---|---|---|---|---|
| 53 | 1 | January 3, 2014 | Stop Settling and Start Dating Smarter | Greg Behrendt, Amiira Ruotola | 0.294 |
| 54 | 2 | January 10, 2014 | Colorism: The Secret Shame | Iyanla Vanzant | N/A |
| 55 | 3 | February 28, 2014 | The Single Moms' Club, Part I | Iyanla Vanzant, Tyler Perry | N/A |
| 56 | 4 | March 7, 2014 | The Single Moms' Club, Part II | Iyanla Vanzant, Tyler Perry | N/A |
| 57 | 5 | May 4, 2014 | Transform Your Life | Bishop T.D. Jakes | N/A |
| 58 | 6 | May 11, 2014 | Unleash the Power of Your Instinct | Bishop T.D. Jakes | N/A |
| 59 | 7 | May 18, 2014 | When Bad Behavior Happens to Good Parents | Dr. Shefali Tsabary | N/A |
| 60 | 8 | September 7, 2014 | Act Like a Success, Think Like a Success with Steve Harvey | Steve Harvey | N/A |
| 61 | 9 | September 14, 2014 | Ask Steve Harvey Anything! | Steve Harvey | N/A |
| 62 | 10 | September 21, 2014 | Families in Parenting Crisis: An Intimate Look | Dr. Shefali Tsabary | N/A |
| 63 | 11 | September 28, 2014 | Oprah and Dr. Shefali: The Children Speak Out | Dr. Shefali Tsabary | N/A |

=== Online Classes ===
| No. | Original air date | Lifeclass Lesson | Lifeclass Teacher |
|---|---|---|---|
| 1 | April 2, 2014 | Five Life-Changing Questions | Cindy Crawford |
| 2 | April 2, 2014 | Getting Your Life Rockin' in the Right Direction | Bret Michaels |
