= List of awards and nominations received by Dottie Rambo =

This is a comprehensive list of awards won by Dottie Rambo, an American singer-songwriter

== Awards by date ==
Christian Music Hall of Fame Inductee:

- 2008

Nashville Songwriter's Association International Winner:

- 2007
  - Nashville Songwriter's Hall Of Fame --Barbara Mandrell presented the honor.

Atlanta Country Music Association

- 2007
  - Atlanta Country Music Hall Of Fame

T.D. Jakes and Potter's House Church

- 2007
  - Lady Of Excellence Award

State Of Kentucky

- 2006
  - Kentucky Music Hall Of Fame --Lily Tomlin presented the honor.

Diamond Awards

- 2005
  - Songwriter of the Year

North American Country Music Association International

- 2004
  - NACMAI Hall Of Fame

ASCAP Foundation

- 2001
  - Lifetime Achievement Award

Dove Award Winner:

- 1981
  - Songwriter of the Year
  - Song of the Year – "We Shall Behold Him"
- 1991
  - Gospel Music Hall of Fame
- 1997
  - Traditional Gospel Recorded Song Of The Year – "I Go To The Rock" Rambo accepted as composer and Whitney Houston accepted as performer. Houston also performed the song on the national telecast with the Georgia Mass Choir.
- 2001
  - Gospel Music Hall Of Fame – "The Rambos"

Grammy Winner:

- 1968
  - Best Soul Gospel Performance – "The Soul of Me"

Christian Country Music Association

- 1994 Songwriter Of The Century Award
- 2002 Living Legend Award
- 2004 Songwriter Of The Year
- 2004 Pioneer Of The Year
