= Victoria Osteen =

American pastor and author (born 1961)

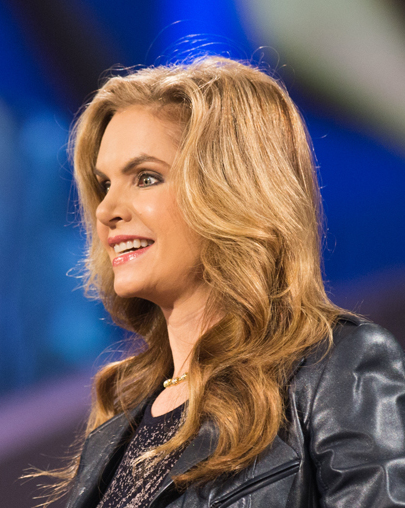
- Victoria Osteen speaking at Lakewood Church in Houston, Texas in 2014
- Born: Victoria Iloff; March 28, 1961 (age 65); Huntsville, Alabama
- Education: University of Houston
- Occupations: Pastor, author
- Spouse: Joel Osteen (m. 1987)
- Children: 2

Victoria Osteen (née Iloff; born March 28, 1961) is an American author and the “co-pastor” of Lakewood Church in Houston, Texas. She is married to Joel Osteen and the daughter-in-law of John Osteen.

== Early life and family ==
Victoria Iloff was born on March 28, 1961, in Huntsville, Alabama. She lived near Marshall Space Flight Center, where her father, Donald Iloff – a mathematician with General Electric – was a member of GE's Saturn rocket project team led by German rocket scientist Wernher von Braun. In 1963, at the age of two, Osteen moved with her family to Houston, Texas, when her father took a position with the National Aeronautics and Space Administration (NASA). She grew up in a southeastern suburb of Houston, near the Manned Spacecraft Center (now known as the Johnson Space Center).

Growing up, Osteen attended a nearby Church of Christ, a relatively conservative church, where her mother, Georgine Iloff, taught Sunday school and her father served as a deacon. Osteen attended (though did not graduate from) the University of Houston, where she studied psychology while working in her mother's jewelry business. It was while working in the jewelry store that she met Joel Osteen in 1985 when he came in to buy a new watch battery.

== Career ==
Osteen founded the Lakewood Church Women's Ministry in 2003, where she currently serves as co-pastor. Her part of the service can be seen on a one-hour program broadcast on the Daystar Television Network and through a live Internet feed.

Her other activities include a regular feature on Houston radio station 89.3 KSBJ. She also supports the organizations Feed the Children and The Bridge, a shelter for battered women.

She has been accused of promoting self-interested materialistic idolatry contrary to the teachings of Jesus.

== Book publishing ==
Osteen's first book, entitled Love Your Life: Living Happy, Healthy, and Whole (ISBN 978-0743296984) was published by Simon & Schuster and released for sale on October 14, 2008. It debuted at number 2 on the New York Times Bestsellers list. With 750,000 copies, the initial printing of Love Your Life was one of the largest by any US publisher in 2008.

In January 2009, Osteen released children's books published by Simon & Schuster's Little Simon imprint. Her five-year agreement with Simon & Schuster covers 13 books for children, including a Bible.

== Personal life ==
On April 4, 1987, Victoria Osteen (née Iloff) married Joel Osteen, with whom she would later become “co-pastors” of Lakewood Church. They have a son and daughter.

In December 2005, on a Continental Airlines flight from Houston to Vail, a flight attendant accused Osteen of shoving her after a request was made about liquid on her armrest; this claim was disputed by witnesses. The FAA fined Osteen $3,000, and the flight attendant, Sharon Brown, subsequently filed a civil suit against Osteen, seeking $405,000 in damages. A Houston jury sided with Osteen, with the foreman calling the lawsuit a waste of time, clearing her of civil liability in August 2008.
