= Oprah's Lifeclass =

- Directed by: Joe Terry
- Presented by: Oprah Winfrey; Iyanla Vanzant
- Country of origin: United States
- Original language: English
- No. of seasons: 5
- No. of episodes: 63 (list of episodes)

Production
- Executive producers: Oprah Winfrey; Sheri Salata
- Producer: Jill Van Lokeren
- Production locations: Harpo Studios; Chicago, Illinois
- Running time: 60 minutes
- Production company: Harpo Studios

Original release
- Network: Oprah Winfrey Network
- Release: October 10, 2011 – September 28, 2014

Related
- The Oprah Winfrey Show; Super Soul Sunday; Oprah Prime

Oprah's Lifeclass (also known as Oprah's Lifeclass: The Tour in the show's second season) is an American primetime television show hosted and produced by Oprah Winfrey, which aired on OWN: Oprah Winfrey Network. The series premiered on October 10, 2011.

== Concept ==
Oprah's Lifeclass is a self-help program that showcases "all of Oprah's lessons, revelations and aha moments over the past 25 years broken down to help make your life better, happier, bigger, richer – more fulfilling."

Each episode revolves around a central topic or lesson that teaches viewers how to live their best life. Winfrey and her co-hosts share their ideas, thoughts, and reflections about the lesson, and the show features interviews with guests (and sometimes past guests and audience members from The Oprah Winfrey Show) whose life experiences relate to each topic. Every episode also features segments with guests from around the world, who connect with Winfrey via Skype, Facebook, Twitter, or Oprah.com.

== Overview ==
=== Season 1 (2011) ===
Season One of Oprah's Lifeclass debuted on Monday October 10, 2011, and aired weekdays at 8/7c on OWN: Oprah Winfrey Network. The first season features twenty-five episodes. During the first week of season one, Winfrey hosted nightly webcasts at 9/8c on Oprah.com to complement each on-air lesson. She was joined by a spiritual teacher or self-help expert, with whom she would discuss each Lifeclass lesson. After the first week of shows, she went on to host a televised webcast every Friday night at 9/8c called Oprah's Lifeclass LIVE to rehash the week's lessons with relationship expert, Iyanla Vanzant.

=== Season 2 (2012): Oprah's Lifeclass: The Tour ===
In the second season, Winfrey took the show on the road with a panel of spiritual teachers. Season Two premiered as Oprah's Lifeclass: The Tour from its first stop at The Peabody Opera House in St. Louis, Missouri on Monday March 26, 2012 at 8/7c with a two-hour live episode with guest co-host Iyanla Vanzant. The second season aired weekly on Monday at 8/7c and features six two-hour episodes that were simultaneously televised on OWN: Oprah Winfrey Network and streamed online at Oprah.com (instead of separate telecast episodes and webcasts, as was the case with the first season). The tour concluded at the Metro Toronto Convention Centre in Toronto, Ontario; the final episode was filmed on Monday April 16, 2012 and aired on OWN on Monday April 30, 2012.

=== Season 3 (2012–13) ===
Winfrey announced on her Twitter page that she would be taking Lifeclass back to Harpo Studios in Chicago for a third season of lessons, beginning Summer 2012. Season Three of Oprah's Lifeclass aired on OWN: Oprah Winfrey Network from Sunday July 29, 2012 until Sunday January 13, 2013. The third season aired Sundays at 9/8c or 10/9c and consisted of seven hour-long episodes. It features Winfrey hosting classes in front of a live studio audience with various guest co-hosts, including Bishop T.D. Jakes and relationship expert Iyanla Vanzant. Some episodes of the third season were filmed at The Hobby Center for the Performing Arts in Sarofim Hall in Houston, Texas on October 5, 2012 with guest co-hosts Joel Osteen and Rick Warren.

=== Season 4 (2013) ===
Season Four of Oprah's Lifeclass premiered on OWN: Oprah Winfrey Network on Sunday February 10, 2013 at 9/8c. In the fourth season, Winfrey hosts classes in front of a live studio audience at Harpo Studios in Chicago with various guest co-hosts, including Lifeclass mainstay Iyanla Vanzant, Gary Chapman, Dr. Phil, and Brené Brown. Throughout the fourth season, Oprah debuted a new set for Lifeclass called "The Social Lab", a smaller studio with additional teaching tools that provide multiple platforms for viewers to connect to the broadcast live via Skype, Facebook, and Twitter.

On May 5, 2013, Oprah debuted a two hour special entitled Oprah's Lifeclass presents Fatherless Sons. The show, with Iyanla Vanzant, focused on the epidemic of fatherless sons in America. The double length episode became the 2nd highest rated Lifeclass in the shows history, behind only Joel Osteen's episode, and was the #1 most social show of the week. Continuing with the theme, on May 12, 2013, The Secret Pain of Single Mothers aired, focusing on mothers raising fatherless sons. Due to the overwhelming reception to the Fatherless Sons themed shows, on July 7, 2013, Fatherless Sons: The Reaction debuted.

=== Season 5 (2014) ===
Season Five of Oprah's Lifeclass premiered on OWN: Oprah Winfrey Network on Friday January 3, 2014 at 10/9c. It features Winfrey hosting classes in front of a live studio audience in "The Social Lab" at Harpo Studios in Chicago with various guest co-hosts, including Lifeclass mainstay Iyanla Vanzant and Greg Behrendt.

== Episodes ==
Season	Episodes	Originally aired	
Season	Episodes	First aired	Last aired
1	25	October 10, 2011	November 11, 2011
2	6	March 26, 2012	April 30, 2012
3	7	July 29, 2012	January 13, 2013
4	14	February 10, 2013	October 6, 2013
5	11	January 3, 2014	September 28, 2014

== Reception ==
=== Critical response ===
Oprah's Lifeclass debuted to mixed but generally negative reviews. Alessandra Stanley of The New York Times stated that "Oprah’s Lifeclass is The Oprah Winfrey Show with the life sucked out of it." Stanley further declared that the new series lacks "Winfrey’s spirited interactions with guests and audiences" and fails to capture the tone of The Oprah Winfrey Show when the host "was irreverent, bold and even at times shocking."

Nuzhat Naoreen of Entertainment Weekly rated the third season premiere featuring Winfrey and Iyanla Vanzant with a "B−" declaring that "the ensuing life lessons delivered by O and her co-chair can feel a bit overbearing and at times... slightly grating. But the show isn't without some notable nuggets of wisdom, though you'll only hear them if you manage to keep your attention from straying as the professors...er, hosts give their lecture."

=== Ratings ===
The debut of Oprah's Lifeclass on October 10, 2011 was seen by 330,000 viewers on OWN: Oprah Winfrey Network. The series was also aired across Planet Green, TLC, Discovery Fit & Health and Investigation Discovery reaching a combined total audience of 1.2 million.

Overall, an average 302,000 nightly viewers watched Oprah's Lifeclass on OWN during the month of October 2011. Online, Oprah’s Lifeclass live webcasts, hosted by Winfrey as she interacts with viewers, have seen over 3.5 million video views to date on Oprah.com and via OWN’s and Winfrey’s Facebook pages.

== Awards and nominations ==
Year	Award	Category	Result
2012	NAACP Image Awards	Outstanding Talk Series	Won
2012	18th Annual NAMIC Vision Awards	Digital Media- Long Form (for Oprah's Lifeclass: Live)	Won
2012	18th Annual NAMIC Vision Awards	Variety/ Talk Show	Nominated
2013	NAACP Image Awards	Outstanding Talk Series	Nominated
2013	Creative Arts Emmy Awards	Creative Achievement In Interactive Media	Won
2014	NAACP Image Awards	Outstanding Talk Series	Nominated
2014	Gracie Awards	Outstanding Talk Show- Entertainment/ Information	Won
2014	20th Annual NAMIC Vision Awards	Variety/ Talk Show	Nominated
2015	NAACP Image Awards	Outstanding News/ Information (Series or Special)	Nominated
