= The Oprah Winfrey Show =

American television talk show (1986–2011)

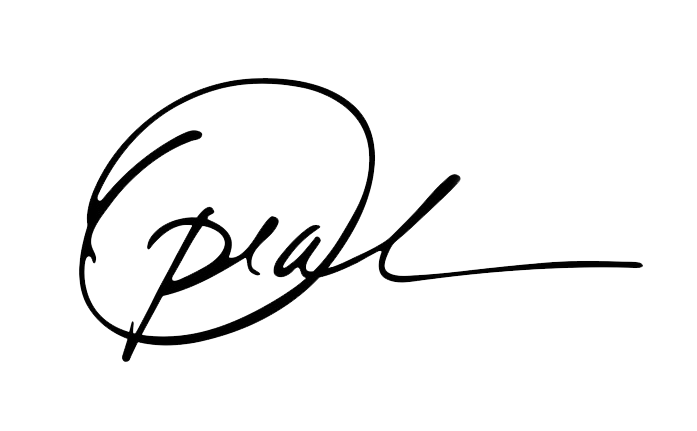
- Genre: Talk show Infotainment
- Created by: Oprah Winfrey
- Directed by: Joseph C. Terry
- Creative director: Reed Woodworth
- Presented by: Oprah Winfrey
- Country of origin: United States
- Original language: English
- No. of seasons: 25
- No. of episodes: 4,561

Production
- Production locations: Harpo Studios; Chicago, Illinois
- Camera setup: Multi-camera
- Running time: 40–45 minutes
- Production companies: WLS-TV Chicago (1986–1988) (seasons 1–3); Harpo Productions (1988–2010) (seasons 3–24); Harpo Studios (2010–2011) (season 25)

Original release
- Network: Syndication
- Release: September 8, 1986 – May 25, 2011

Related
- Oprah's Lifeclass; Super Soul Sunday; Oprah's Next Chapter; Oprah: Where Are They Now?

The Oprah Winfrey Show (Note: The show is often referred to as The Oprah Show or simply Oprah.) is an American daytime talk show that was hosted by Oprah Winfrey. The show ran in syndication for twenty-five seasons from September 8, 1986, to May 25, 2011, in which it broadcast 4,561 episodes. The show was taped in Chicago and produced by Winfrey. It remains the highest-rated daytime talk show in American television history.

The show was highly influential to many young stars, and many of its themes have penetrated into the American pop-cultural consciousness. Winfrey used the show as an educational platform, featuring book clubs, interviews, self-improvement segments, and philanthropic forays into world events. The show did not attempt to profit off products it endorsed; it had no licensing agreement with retailers when products were promoted, nor did the show make any money from endorsing books for its book club.

Oprah was one of the longest-running daytime talk shows in history. The show received 47 Daytime Emmy Awards before Winfrey chose to stop submitting it for consideration in 2000. In 2002, TV Guide ranked it at No. 49 on TV Guide's 50 Greatest TV Shows of All Time. In 2013, they ranked it as the 19th greatest TV show of all time. In 2023, Variety ranked The Oprah Winfrey Show #17 on its list of the 100 greatest TV shows of all time.

== Early history ==
Oprah had its roots in A.M. Chicago, a half-hour morning talk show airing on WLS-TV, an ABC owned-and-operated station in Chicago. In 1983, Dennis Swanson, the new general manager of WLS-TV, hired Winfrey to replace Robb Weller, that program's former host. Winfrey took over as host on January 2, 1984, and, within a month, took it from last place to first place in local Chicago ratings. By 1985, the local A.M. Chicago program was renamed The Oprah Winfrey Show. Following Winfrey's success in performing in the role of Sofia in the film The Color Purple (for which she earned Academy Award and Golden Globe nominations), on September 8, 1986, the talk show was relaunched under its current title and picked up nationally. For the premiere, the show's producers tried rigorously to book Miami Vice's Don Johnson as the first guest, even trying to bribe him with Dom Pérignon and a pair of rhinestone sunglasses. All attempts to book Johnson failed and Winfrey decided to "do what we do best, and that is a show about and with everyday people". The theme for the premiere show was "How to Marry the Man or Woman of Your Choice".

== Interviews ==
Winfrey interviewed a large number of public figures and everyday people during the show's 25-year history. Celebrities and newsmakers often went on the show to share their secrets and when a serious story hit, the Oprah show focused on putting a human face on the headlines.

=== Celebrities ===
Winfrey claims her worst interviewing experience was with Elizabeth Taylor in the show's second season. Just before the interview, Taylor asked Winfrey not to ask any questions about her relationships. Winfrey found this to be a challenge considering Taylor had been married seven times.

On February 10, 1993, Winfrey sat down in a prime-time special broadcast with Michael Jackson, who had performed ten days earlier in the Super Bowl XXVII halftime show, for what would become the most-watched interview in television history. Jackson, an intensely private entertainer, had not given an interview in 14 years. The event was broadcast live from Jackson's Neverland Ranch and was watched by 90 million people worldwide and, as a result, his then 14-month-old studio album Dangerous returned to the top-ten on the album charts. Jackson discussed missing out on a normal childhood and his strained relationship with his father, Joe Jackson. During the interview, Jackson attempted to dispel many of the rumors surrounding him and told Winfrey he suffered from the skin-pigment disorder known as vitiligo when asked about the change in the color of his skin. While admitting to getting a nose job, he denied all other plastic surgery rumors. Later in the interview, Jackson was joined by his close friend Elizabeth Taylor, her third appearance on the show.

Winfrey's interview with Tom Cruise, which was broadcast on May 23, 2005, also gained notoriety. Cruise "jumped around the set, hopped onto a couch, fell rapturously to one knee and repeatedly professed his love for his then-girlfriend, Katie Holmes." The scene quickly became part of American pop-cultural discourse and was heavily parodied in media. Celine Dion appeared on the show 28 times, the most of any celebrity, besides Gayle King, Winfrey's best friend, who appeared 141 times. Winfrey also interviewed Chicago's "Guardian Angels" and Raymond Lear in 1988.

=== Notable guests ===
Winfrey interviewed Kathy Bray three weeks after her 10-year-old son, Scott, was accidentally killed by a friend who had found his father's gun. Viewers later commented that the interview changed their feelings about having guns in their homes. In the 1989–90 season, Truddi Chase—a woman who was diagnosed with dissociative identity disorder, having 92 distinct personalities—appeared on the show. Chase had been violently and sexually abused beginning at the age of two and said her old self ceased to exist after that. After introducing Chase, who was there to promote her book When Rabbit Howls, Winfrey unexpectedly broke down in tears while reading the teleprompter, relating her own childhood molestation to that of the guest. Unable to control herself, Winfrey repeatedly asked producers to stop filming.

Erin Kramp, a mother dying of breast cancer, appeared on the show in 1998. After realizing that her six-year-old daughter, Peyton, would have to grow up without her, Kramp began recording videotapes filled with motherly advice on everything from makeup tips to finding a husband. She also wrote letters and bought gifts for Peyton to open every Christmas and birthday she was gone. Kramp died on October 31, 1998. She had recorded over a hundred videos and audiotapes for her daughter.

Jo Ann Compton's daughter Laurie Ann was stabbed to death in 1988—and a decade later, the mom was tangled in her grief. "I hope they're in the same hell I'm in," she said of her daughter's murderers on a 1998 show. Oprah brought in Dr. Phil McGraw to help Jo Ann. He asked her if she thought her daughter would want her to be in so much pain—and Compton said no. "Maybe the betrayal is focusing on the day of her death, rather than celebrating the event of her life." Phil continued. "She lived for 18 vibrant years, and you focus on the day she died." After a moment, Compton uttered her breakthrough sentence: "I never thought of it that way." Later, she sobbed while revealing that she had been planning to end her life after the show. When Compton returned to the show in 2011, she had a new viewpoint on the daughter she lost: "She continues to stay alive every time I do something positive." Compton's surviving daughter, Cindy, said "She went from existing to living. It was an amazing transformation."

In 2001, Winfrey met 11-year-old Mattie Stepanek, who was born with dysautonomic mitochondrial myopathy and wrote inspirational poetry he titled "Heartsongs". On the show, Stepanek stated, "A heartsong doesn't have to be a song in your heart. It doesn't have to be talking about love and peace. ... It's your message, what you feel like you need to do." In October 2008, Winfrey spoke at the posthumous dedication of Mattie J.T Stepanek Park in Maryland.

== Regular segments and campaigns ==
=== Oprah's Book Club ===
Originally featured a monthly book highlight, including author interviews. Its popularity caused featured books to shoot to the top of bestseller lists, often increasing sales by as many as a million copies at its peak. It was suspended in 2002 and returned in 2003, featuring more classic works of literature, with reduced selections per season. The original format was reintroduced in September 2005, but Winfrey's selection of James Frey's A Million Little Pieces became controversial due to accusations of falsification. January 2006 saw Elie Wiesel's Night selected; Winfrey even traveled to Auschwitz with Wiesel. In 2008, Eckhart Tolle's A New Earth was selected. Modernizing the book club's platform, Winfrey and Tolle began a series of live webcast classes that were streamed on Oprah.com to discuss elements of the book with a worldwide audience.

=== Oprah's Favorite Things ===
Items personally favored by Winfrey were featured on the show and given away to audience members. Since its launch in 1996, the "Favorite Things" episode quickly became the hottest ticket in television. When a product was featured, its sales skyrocketed. Select groups were sometimes chosen to receive the items. In 2004, the audience was made up of educators from across the country. Hurricane Katrina volunteer workers were invited to the 2009 show. Winfrey has said that the iPad, given away to her 2010 audience, was her all-time favorite "Favorite Thing". During a Season 25: Oprah Behind the Scenes episode documenting the production of the giveaway, Winfrey talked about why the event resonates with viewers:

The things of "Favorite Things" is the least of the experience. It's sharing that moment with 300 other people, acknowledging that surprise and fantastical, sensational, wonderful, happy things can still occur in your life.

=== Oprah & Gayle's Big Adventures ===
Winfrey and Gayle King are friends. In 1976, Winfrey was working as a news anchor in Baltimore when she met King, a production assistant. The two bonded during a snowstorm when Winfrey told King she could stay at her home to wait it out. Their friendship was often showcased on the show when the best friends decided to take a trip together. In 2004, they traveled back in time, participating in the PBS series Colonial House. The series intended to recreate daily life in Plymouth Colony in 1628. Their 24-hour Puritan adventure included wood-chopping, cooking over an open fire, battling with mice, and using leaves as toilet paper.

Winfrey and King joined 60 other women for a spa getaway in 2006. They spent five days at Miraval Life in Balance Resort and Spa taking part in self-improvement exercises. For an exercise called A Swing and a Prayer, the women were hoisted 40 feet (12 m) in the air and told to let go. Once in the air, King—who is afraid of heights—would not let herself fall. Winfrey could not help but laugh as King remained in the air, but eventually persuaded her to let go.

In the summer of 2006, Winfrey and King decided to go on an 11-day, 3,600-mile (5,800 km) road trip across America – from California to New York. They were excited to meet people from small towns and see how America really lives. However, the initial excitement quickly wore off. The friends had minor meltdowns and fought for control over the radio; King likes to have music constantly playing while driving, while Winfrey prefers silence. Despite the challenges of the road trip, they got to see the beauty of Sedona, meet the people of Navajo Nation, crash a couple of weddings, take a dip in the healing waters of Pagosa Springs, and learn about Amish culture. Winfrey's many driving anxieties and King's tone-deaf singing made the trip a huge hit with viewers.

The friends visited the State Fair of Texas in Dallas in 2010. They played traditional state fair games such as Flip-the-Chick and the water gun race. They tried many of the fried foods offered at the fair and judged a best "Best of Show" food contest. For the farewell season, the best friends hit the road again for an overnight camping trip at Yosemite National Park. Park ranger Shelton Johnson wrote to Winfrey because he was concerned by the low number of African-Americans who visited the national parks each year. So Winfrey and King packed up their camper and headed to Yosemite to help Johnson attract visitors. When they arrived, Johnson took Winfrey and King around the park to see some of its famous sites including Mariposa Grove and the Tunnel View, from which El Capitan is visible in the distance. On the way to the campsite, Winfrey made a sharp turn causing their trailer to hit a rock. After setting up their pop-up camper, the two mixed up some Moscow Mules to pass out to their camping neighbors. The drink has become a signature Oprah cocktail. The next day, they took a lesson in fly fishing and wrapped up their stay with a mule ride.

=== Remembering Your Spirit ===
A segment at the end of the show which featured spiritual counselors, ordinary people who had been involved in extraordinary situations. They would come on the show and share their stories of overcoming adversity with the audience, inspiring viewers to do the same in their own lives.

=== Change Your Life TV ===
==== Iyanla Vanzant ====
Iyanla Vanzant is a former attorney, spiritual teacher and self-help expert who was a regular on the show in the late 1990s. She started the show in its 12th season and became known for her no-nonsense, hard-hitting, and often humorous advice. Vanzant's take on everything from cheating spouses to financial struggles connected with viewers and, at times, Winfrey sat in the audience while Vanzant led the show. Her books In the Meantime and One Day My Soul Just Opened Up became New York Times bestsellers.

==== Dr. Phil ====
Winfrey met Phil McGraw when he worked as a consultant for her legal team during her 1998 beef trial in Amarillo, Texas. Starting in April of that year, he became a fixture on the show and a viewer favorite. McGraw gave guests tough, tell-it-like-it-is advice and did not allow excuses or rationalizations for their bad habits, bad marriages, or bad attitudes. His popular Tuesday appearances on the show led to his own talk show, Dr. Phil, in 2002.

==== Suze Orman ====
Financial expert Suze Orman became a viewer favorite, offering money tips, spending interventions, and her famous "Suze smackdowns". She encouraged people to be honest with themselves about what they could afford and gave advice on getting rid of credit card debt. Her motivational approach to fixing finances has led to her own financial advice empire.

=== What's the Buzz? ===
Winfrey introduced up-and-coming public figures who generated industry buzz but not otherwise widely known. In what several media commentators have labelled The Oprah Effect, people appearing on this segment such as Oscar-winner Jamie Foxx and singer James Blunt benefited from the extra publicity the show garnered. Blunt, in particular, saw album sales increase dramatically and landed a Top Two spot on the Billboard 200.

=== Wildest Dreams ===
A show feature called "Wildest Dreams" fulfilled the dreams of people reported to Winfrey by the producers – mostly viewers who wrote into the show – be the dreams of a new house, an encounter with a favorite performer, or a guest role on a popular TV show. It was named after the Tina Turner song "In Your Wildest Dreams", and Turner was one of the celebrities featured on the segment.

=== Tuesdays with Dr. Oz ===
Mehmet Oz, the head of cardiac surgery at Columbia Presbyterian Medical Center in NYC and better known to millions of Winfrey's viewers as "Dr. Oz", regularly appeared on Tuesdays during the 2008–2009 season. In 2009, Dr. Oz debuted The Dr. Oz Show in first-run syndication. The series is co-produced by Harpo Productions and Sony Pictures Television.

=== Fridays Live ===
A weekly live episode premiered in the show's 23rd season with a panel consisting of Winfrey, Gayle King, Mark Consuelos, and Ali Wentworth. The panel discussed the week's news and highlighted events in the media and on the show. In the 2009–10 season, Winfrey hosted this segment on her own. Fridays Live did not return for the show's 25th season.

=== No Phone Zone ===
In March 2010, Winfrey began a campaign to stop drivers from talking or texting on their cell phone in their vehicles while driving. This campaign was regularly noted near the beginning or at the end of episodes.

== Notable moments ==
On November 10, 1986, during a show about sexual abuse, Winfrey revealed that she was raped by a relative when she was nine years old. Since this episode, Winfrey has used the show as a platform to help catch child predators, raise awareness, and give victims a voice.

Liberace appeared in the first season of the show on December 25, 1986. He performed a Christmas medley; Winfrey said it was "the most beautiful I've ever heard". Six weeks later, he died of cardiac arrest due to congestive heart failure brought on by subacute encephalopathy. The episode was Liberace's final televised appearance. The show had only been on the air for just six months when, in 1987, Winfrey traveled to Forsyth County, Georgia, a community in which, for 75 years, no black person had lived. Winfrey brought attention to racial tensions in the area, which had just experienced several protests. The show was set up as a town hall meeting where residents expressed their divisive opinions on the matter. The meeting was becoming heated when one woman stood up and said:

I just hate to think that someone is going to get hurt before the people get some sense about them and talk about this and get it like it's supposed to be...black and white together in Forsyth County. There's no other way.

The "Diet Dreams Come True" episode from November 15, 1988, has become one of the most talked-about moments in the history of the show. After years of struggling to lose weight, Winfrey had finally succeeded in doing so. In July of that year, she had started the Optifast diet while weighing 212 pounds. By Fall, she weighed 145 pounds. To commemorate achieving her weight loss goals, Winfrey wheeled out a wagon full of fat to represent the 67 pounds she had lost on the diet. She showed off her slim figure in a pair of size 10 Calvin Klein jeans. However, after returning to real food she quickly gained back much of the weight she had lost. Winfrey now refers to that moment as her "ego in a pom pom salute."

While doing a show centered on women drug users in 1995, Winfrey opened up about her personal history with drug abuse:

I relate to your story so much. In my twenties, I have done this drug cocaine. I know exactly what you're talking about. It is my life's great big secret. It is such a secret because I realize that the public person that I have become, if the story were ever revealed, the tabloids would exploit it and what a big issue it would be. But I was involved with a man in my twenties who introduced me to cocaine. I always felt that the drug itself was not the problem, but that I was addicted to the man. I've often said over the years in my attempt to come out and say it, I have said many times, I did things in my twenties I was ashamed of, I've done things I've felt guilty about. And that is my life's great secret that's been held over my head. I understand the shame and I understand the guilt, I understand the secrecy, I understand all that.

In 1996, Winfrey spoke with seven of the Little Rock Nine and three white former classmates who tormented the group on their first day of high school in 1957 as well as a student who had befriended them. Winfrey was grateful to have the remaining members of the Little Rock Nine on her show because she credits her success to those who have contributed to the Civil Rights movement which paved the way for people like herself. Comedian Ellen DeGeneres came out publicly as a lesbian during her appearance on the show in 1997 after appearing on a Time magazine cover next to the headline "Yep, I'm gay." At the time, DeGeneres was the star of her own sitcom, ABC's Ellen. The episode brought Winfrey the most hate mail she had ever received.

Clemantine Wamariya and her sister Claire appeared on the show in 2006 when Wamariya was selected as one of the winners of an essay contest held by Winfrey. It was revealed that the siblings had not seen their parents in 12 years after fleeing Rwanda during the 1994 genocide. Winfrey surprised the sisters by flying their family to Chicago for one of the most emotional reunions on the show. In 2007, the Marines of the Second Light Armored Reconnaissance Battalion Alpha Company and their naval corpsman, made the show their first stop after a seven-month tour on the front lines in Iraq. Winfrey welcomed the Marines with a big homecoming celebration where they were reunited with their loved ones on the show.

During a 2010 episode, 200 men who were molested stand together.

On November 11, 2009, Charla Nash, who was mauled by her friend and employer Sandra Herold's pet chimpanzee Travis, came to the show to speak out for the first time about the terrifying attack that took place just nine months prior. Nash wears a veil daily because the attack left devastating injuries to her face and she "doesn't want to scare people." During the show, she agreed to lift her veil for the first time in public.

While taping the show's 24th-season premiere on September 8, 2009, the entire audience of 21,000 people, gathered on Chicago's Magnificent Mile, surprised Winfrey by breaking out into a synchronized dance set to The Black Eyed Peas' performance of "I Gotta Feeling" (with new lyrics congratulating Winfrey on her show's longevity). The dance had been choreographed and rehearsed for weeks by a core group of dancers, who taught it to the entire crowd earlier in the day. During the farewell season, two hundred men who were molested came forward as part of a two-day event in 2010 to take a stand against sexual abuse. The men were joined by director and producer Tyler Perry, who had also experienced sexual abuse. Winfrey hoped that the episode would help survivors suffering in silence release the shame.

On January 24, 2011, Winfrey revealed that just before Thanksgiving 2010 she had discovered she has a half-sister. Winfrey decided to share the news on her show because she knew the story would eventually get out and wanted to be the first to address the matter.

=== Giveaways ===
On the season premiere of 2004, every person in Winfrey's show audience was given a new Pontiac G6 that was donated by General Motors, worth about $8 million in total. The giveaway was the genesis of the oft-satirized Oprah quote, "You get a car! You get a car! Everybody gets a car!" For the premiere of the show's farewell season, the studio audience of 300 "ultimate fans" were rewarded by being given a trip to Australia with Winfrey (donated by Australian tourism bodies). Other giveaway shows included the annual Oprah's Favorite Things show, in which the studio audience received products Winfrey considered good Christmas gifts.

=== Controversies ===
In 1996, on a discussion of Mad Cow Disease, Winfrey stated that the disease fears had "stopped [her] cold from eating another burger!" Texas cattle ranchers considered that quote tantamount to defamation, and promptly sued her for libel. The show was still producing new episodes at the time of the trial and could not go into reruns, so the production was forced to move to Amarillo, Texas for a period of approximately one month during the proceedings. A gag order meant Winfrey was not allowed to even mention the trial on her show. Winfrey was found not liable. The trial and move to Amarillo led to Winfrey meeting Phil McGraw; Winfrey made McGraw a regular guest on her show shortly thereafter, which eventually led to McGraw getting his own show, produced by Winfrey's Harpo Productions.

A controversial episode, which aired in 2005 (though originally aired to little apparent notice in October 2003), saw guests discussing the sexual act of "rimming", igniting criticism. The FCC received a proliferation of complaints from angry parents whose children watched the show in an early-evening slot in many television markets. However, most FCC correspondents were prodded to write by Howard Stern, a noteworthy target of the agency, as well as Jimmy Kimmel, in an attempt to expose an FCC double standard.

During the 2008 presidential election campaign, Winfrey was criticized for apparently declining to invite Republican vice presidential candidate Sarah Palin to her show until after the election. A 2009 episode attracted criticism from the crowd after Winfrey suggested mothers should buy vibrators for their teenage daughters. Winfrey's program was criticized for featuring alternative medicine and junk science advocates such as Suzanne Somers and vaccine denialist Jenny McCarthy.

In the lead-up to Winfrey's tour of Australia, the show was heavily criticized for airing a segment sponsored by the McDonald's Corporation in which it was claimed by Australian TV personality Carrie Bickmore that Australians liked to hang out at "hip McCafés". This depiction of Australian culture was greeted with surprise by many Australians, and anger throughout the Australian coffee industry, which claimed the statements did not accurately reflect the industry, painted the Australian coffee drinker in a bad light, and expected that the industry would be negatively affected by the statements. In the same episode, McDonald's products were handed out to the studio audience.

== Final season ==
Early in its 12th season, Winfrey confessed she was "exhausted" and considered quitting. However, while making the 1998 film Beloved, Winfrey then admitted that it brought her back to her responsibility as an admired black woman with a great deal of power and influence. She realized that being in such a position within the media industry, she could make a positive difference in people's lives. Winfrey was once again inspired to continue to help people take better control of their destinies, hence her slogan, "Live Your Best Life".

I made the decision ... in the midst of doing Beloved. I was doing some scenes—Beloved is about an ex-slave, and during that process of doing that I connected to really what slavery had meant, and my own personal ancestry and history connected it to a way I have never before from reading all about Black history and, you know, talking to relatives. And I realized that I had no right to quit coming from a history of people who had no voice, who had no power, and that I have been given this—this blessed opportunity to speak to people, to influence them in ways that can make a difference in their lives, and to just use that.

On January 15, 2008, Discovery Communications, Harpo Productions, and Winfrey announced a joint venture to establish a new cable channel in 2009, known as the Oprah Winfrey Network (OWN). In November 2008, it was reported that, during a conference call, Discovery Communications CEO David Zaslav stated that Winfrey did not intend to renew her contracts for The Oprah Winfrey Show beyond the 2010–11 season. Zaslav stated that Oprah could potentially move to the new channel in some form following the end of the syndicated series. However, Harpo Productions denied the report, stating that Winfrey had "not made a final decision as to whether she will continue her show in syndication beyond [2011]".

On November 20, 2009, Winfrey officially announced that The Oprah Winfrey Show would conclude in 2011, after its 25th and final season. Winfrey explained that 25 was "the perfect number—the exact right time", and that "I love this show. This show has been my life. And I love it enough to know when it's time to say goodbye." The 25th season premiered on September 13, 2010, featuring guest John Travolta, and an audience of 300 of her "most loyal" fans.

During the episode, it was also announced that the entire audience had been invited to join Winfrey on an eight-day, all-expenses-paid trip to Sydney, Australia for a series of special episodes, via a plane piloted by Travolta. On December 11, 2010, Winfrey arrived in Sydney to record shows at the Sydney Opera House. Winfrey and her 300 American audience members were officially welcomed at a cocktail party in Sydney's Botanical Gardens overlooking Sydney Harbour. The beach-themed party, hosted by New South Wales Premier Kristina Keneally, featured live music and a fireworks display over the water which culminated in the lighting of a red 'O' on the Harbour Bridge. The episodes in Australia were coordinated between Harpo Studios, Tourism Australia, Tourism New South Wales, the Sydney Opera House, Tourism Victoria, Tourism Queensland, R. M. Williams and Network Ten. The federal government of Australia spent $1.5 million on the event while the government of the state of New South Wales spent an additional $1–2 million to promote the region. Tourism minister Martin Ferguson said "I think it's money well spent". In addition, Tourism Victoria spent a further A$650,000.

The farewell season featured several notable cast reunions including The Sound of Music, The Color Purple, and The Way We Were. In May 2011, Winfrey interviewed U.S. President Barack Obama and First Lady Michelle Obama, her first-ever interview with a sitting president and First Lady. They talked about the challenges of parenting at the White House, the strength of their relationship, and their concern for the country's future. President Obama also thanked Winfrey for her contributions to the country. "You've got a big heart, and you share it with people. Nobody knows how to connect better than you do," he said. "We are just blessed and grateful to have you in our lives."

=== Final episodes ===
The final episode of The Oprah Winfrey Show aired on May 25, 2011. It was preceded by a two-part farewell special recorded at the United Center in Chicago in front of an audience of 13,000. The two-part show featured appearances by Aretha Franklin, Tom Cruise, Stevie Wonder, Patti LaBelle, Beyoncé, Tom Hanks, Maria Shriver, Will Smith, and Madonna. Several hundred graduates of Morehouse College who were the recipients of Oprah's Oprah Winfrey Scholarship also attended to thank Oprah and pledge their future support of the scholarship program. The final episode was a smaller affair, recorded in the usual recording studio. Winfrey spent most of the finale thanking the show's staff and her fans.

I've been asked many times during this farewell season, 'Is ending the show bittersweet?' Well, I say all sweet. No bitter... here is why: Many of us have been together for 25 years. We have hooted and hollered together, had our aha! moments, we ugly-cried together and we did our gratitude journals... I thank you all for your support and your trust in me. I thank you for sharing this yellow brick road of blessings. I thank you for tuning in every day along with your mothers and your sisters and your daughters, your partners, gay and otherwise, your friends and all the husbands who got coaxed into watching Oprah... I thank you for being as much of a sweet inspiration for me as I've tried to be for you. I won't say goodbye. I'll just say... until we meet again. To God be the glory.

She finished the show in tears. The finale was marked by viewing parties across the US, and the episode was also shown in movie theaters. The episode received the show's highest rating in 17 years. After the show's final episode, reruns of Oprah remained available to air until September 2011, by which point individual stations had selected other syndicated or local programs to fill the show's timeslot. Several stations that had carried the show in the 4:00 p.m. timeslot began carrying local news programs at that time, with a handful of stations debuting these newscasts the day after the final episode aired; as a result, the show's final months of reruns did not air in the normal timeslot in some areas.

== Broadcast history and release ==
The show aired on most ABC-owned stations in the United States (except KTRK-TV in Houston and former O&O WTVG in Toledo, with the show being aired on the CBS-affiliated stations in the respective markets, KHOU and WTOL), as well as various other stations through CBS Television Distribution, successor to King World), CTV in most Canadian markets, Diva Universal in Malaysia, TV3 in Ireland, GNT in Brazil, national TV3 in Sweden, Network Ten in Australia, La7d in Italy, MBC 4 in the Arab world, MetroTV in Indonesia, FARSI1 in Iran, Star World in India, and in the Netherlands on RTL 4.

In the United Kingdom, the show has been broadcast on a number of different channels. Channel 4 first broadcast the series on Monday October 3, 1988, The BBC & Sky one acquired the rights and began broadcasting the series from 9 January 1995 which meant during 1995 the show was seen on three channels. Five picked up the terrestrial rights from early 1998. Rights subsequently went to Living TV by 2002, then ITV2 in 2006, next to Diva TV, and then to TLC for the last couple of series. The show aired in 149 countries worldwide and was often renamed and dubbed into other languages.

== Reception ==
=== Television viewership and ratings ===
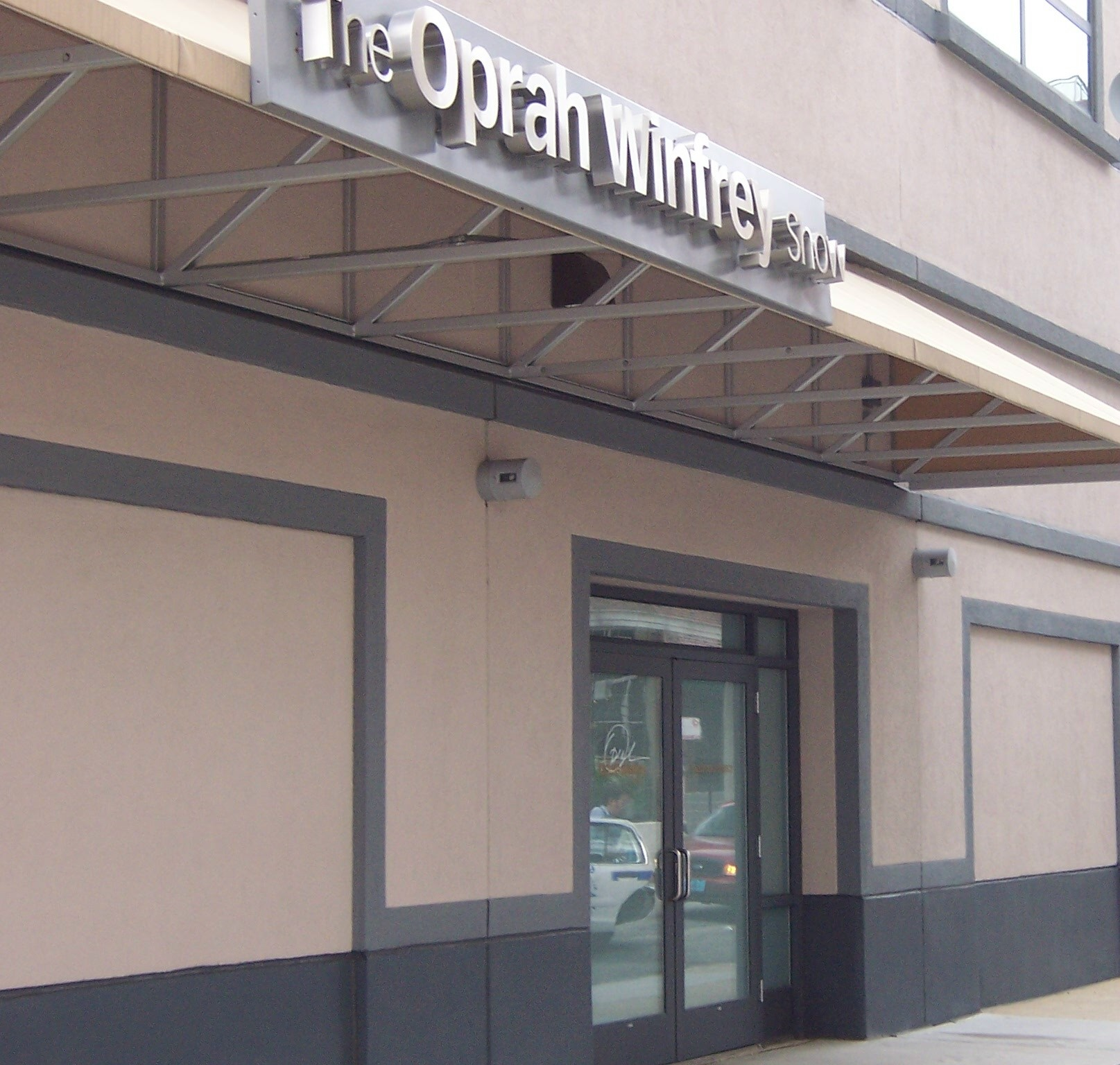
The marquee for the show is seen, above the entrance at Harpo Studios in Near West Side, Chicago. The first Oprah show was taped there on January 15, 1990.

It has been reported that the show averages an estimated 7, 14, and 15–20 million viewers a day in the United States. It has also been reported at 26 million and 42 million a week (5.2 and 8.4 million a day). Viewership for the show has been reported to have dropped over the years, averaging 12.6 million in 1991–2, 9 million in 2004, 9 million in 2005, 7.8 in 2006, 7.3 million in 2008, and 6.2 million in 2009.

The show was No. 1 in the talk show ratings since its debut. The show spent many years as the highest-rated program in daytime television. Even with stiff competition, Oprah still maintained a consistent lead over other talk shows.

=== Critical response ===
Ken Tucker of Entertainment Weekly praised Winfrey's ability to connect with her audience. Newsweek listed the show as one of the best talk shows in television history.

=== Cultural impact ===
Multiple shows have spun off of Oprah, including Dr. Phil (2002−2023), Rachael Ray (2006−2023), The Dr. Oz Show (2009−2022) and The Nate Berkus Show (2010−2012). The Doctors (2009−2022) is a spin-off of Dr. Phil, making it a third-generation spin-off. The show inspired television presenters of other talk shows, such as Jenny Jones of The Jenny Jones Show.

=== Awards and nominations ===
Awards and nominations
Award	Year (Note: Indicates the year of ceremony)	Category	Nominee(s)	Result	Ref.
GLAAD Media Awards	2004	Outstanding Talk Show Episode	"The Husband Who Became a Woman"	Won	
GLAAD Media Awards	2005	Outstanding Talk Show Episode	"The 11-Year-Old Who Wants a Sex Change"	Won	
GLAAD Media Awards	2006	Outstanding Talk Show Episode	"When I Knew I Was Gay"	Won	
GLAAD Media Awards	2006	Outstanding Talk Show Episode	"When Your Identical Twin Has a Sex Change"	Nominated	
GLAAD Media Awards	2007	Outstanding Talk Show Episode	"Wives Confess They Are Gay"	Won	
GLAAD Media Awards	2008	Outstanding Talk Show Episode	"Born in the Wrong Body"	Won	
GLAAD Media Awards	2008	Outstanding Talk Show Episode	"Gay Around the World"	Nominated	
GLAAD Media Awards	2008	Outstanding Talk Show Episode	"Growing Up Intersex"	Nominated	
GLAAD Media Awards	2009	Outstanding Talk Show Episode	"The Pregnant Man"	Nominated	
GLAAD Media Awards	2010	Outstanding Talk Show Episode	"Ellen DeGeneres and Her Wife, Portia de Rossi"	Won	
GLAAD Media Awards	2011	Outstanding Talk Show Episode	"Ricky Martin Coming Out as a Gay Man and a New Dad"	Won	
GLAAD Media Awards	2012	Outstanding Talk Show Episode	"Coming Out on the Oprah Show: 25 Years of Unforgettable Guests"	Won	

== See also ==
- Oprah After the Show
