= Your Best Life Now =

2004 book by Joel Osteen

- Cover
- Author: Joel Osteen
- Subject: Self-help, religion
- Publisher: FaithWords
- Publication date: 2004-10-12
- ISBN: 978-0-446-53275-4
- OCLC: 55149452
- Dewey Decimal: 248.4 22
- LC Class: BV4598.2 .O88 2004

Your Best Life Now: 7 Steps to Living at Your Full Potential is a book by pastor Joel Osteen. It was published on October 12, 2004, by FaithWords. There is also a calendar, board game, and study guide available based on the book. A 10th Anniversary edition was published on September 3, 2014.

== Reception ==
The book was ranked #1 on The New York Times Self Help Best Seller list. It remained a bestseller for more than two years and has sold over 8 million copies.

== Outline ==
1. Vision
2. Self-Image
3. Power of Thoughts and Words
4. Let Go of the Past
5. Strength Through Adversity
6. Live to Give
7. Choose to be Happy

== Criticism ==
In the 2010 West Coast Conference, "Christless Christianity", John F. MacArthur criticized this book as being a part of the prosperity gospel. Critics of prosperity gospel consider its teachings anathema to the gospel of Mark:

“Jesus, looking at the man, loved him and said, ‘You lack one thing; go, sell what you own, and give the money to the poor, and you will have treasure in heaven; then come, follow me.’ When the man heard this, he was shocked and went away grieving, for he had many possessions” (10:21-22).

Osteen has made over $10 million from “Your Best Life Now,” keeping 90% of profits and donating the remainder to his church.
