= Sarah Jakes Roberts =

American pastor, author, and nonprofit executive

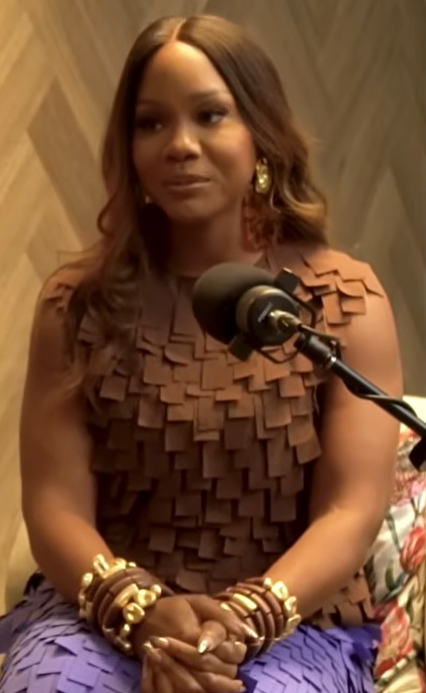
- Roberts in 2025
- Born: July 17, 1988 (age 38); Charleston, West Virginia, US
- Education: Texas Christian University
- Occupations: Pastor, author, nonprofit executive
- Organization(s): The Potter's House, Woman Evolve
- Father: T. D. Jakes

Sarah Jakes Roberts (born July 17, 1988) is an American pastor, author, and nonprofit executive who has served as the co-pastor of The Potter's House in Dallas, which was founded by her father, since 2025. She previously served as the co-pastor of two branches of the church. She also writes books and has run a nonprofit called Woman Evolve, which is focused on women's empowerment. She was named to the Time 100 Next in 2023.

== Early life ==
Roberts was born to T. D. Jakes, a pastor, and his wife Serita on July 17, 1988. She was born in West Virginia but grew up in Dallas. She became a teen mom at age 14. Her father would later use this as an example of how "it is the struggle that makes you strong". She finished high school early and then attended Texas Christian University. In 2010 she started blogging. She has said that around this time she worked as a waitress in a strip club. Her blogs soon began to gain popularity, and she was frequently invited as a motivational speaker. Additionally, she created her own podcast.

== Ministry ==
In 2014, Touré Roberts (whom she would later marry) invited her to give a sermon at his church on Mother's Day, after the two were introduced by a mutual friend. After the sermon, which was her first, she felt that preaching could be a way to reach people who were not "traditionally religious" and became a visiting preacher at other churches. During her preaching tours, she brought a trauma therapist to support those she was preaching to. In one instance, she removed her wig during a sermon to illustrate her opinion regarding devotion being more important than appearance, which led to her going viral. She also visited churches in other locations, including Nigeria.

She served as co-pastor of two of the branches of The Potter's House together with her husband, those in Denver and Los Angeles. The Denver branch went online in March 2020 and remained so permanently. They became assistant pastors at the main church in Dallas in 2023.

In April 2025, her father announced that she would, along with her husband, be stepping in as co-pastors to succeed him at The Potter's House.

== Woman Evolve ==
In 2017, Roberts founded Woman Evolve, a nonprofit organization that produces media and conferences focused on themes of female empowerment. She expanded it to include books, a podcast, and an annual conference, of which notable attendees have included Kelly Rowland and Tina Knowles. It also includes a fashion line, which she has stated as showing "you can slay and pray all at the same time". Conferences frequently draw tens of thousands of attendees and emphasize evolution and purpose, as well as the importance of shattering the glass ceiling. In 2022, her father anointed her to succeed him in his own women's empowerment ministry.

== Writing ==
She is also a New York Times Best-Selling Author: two of her books, 2021's Woman Evolve and 2024's Power Moves, are New York Times Best-Sellers. Her first book was a memoir, while her second book discussed her pregnancy through the lens of Mary, mother of Jesus. For a time, she was also senior editor to a women's magazine. She has discussed self-care in her books, and has stated she wants them to be inclusive of those merely curious about faith.

== Views ==
Roberts and her husband stated in a joint interview that "serving the poor and the marginalized is a fundamental part of what it means to be a Christian" and that "Although we have modeled for [our children] the beauty and the value of what has come to be known as 'traditional marriage', we will also challenge them to love and respect all people regardless of their personal decision on what a healthy family should look like."

In October 2022, the two took part in Charlamagne tha God's "Mental Wealth Expo". During the event, she apologized for harmful messages that previously had been spread by churches, stating "I apologize as a faith leader for the moments you were told to just pray it away, for the moments you were told you would never be one of the good girls, or good guys, or damaged." She continued "that was not a reflection of God's heart towards you" and that "If you have to bypass the church to get to God, I get it."

== Personal life and recognition ==
Roberts met her first husband, Robert Henson, while attending Texas Christian University. They were married for four years, with Roberts filing for divorce in 2012 citing infidelity. She met her second and current husband, Touré Roberts, through a mutual friend in 2014. In April 2026, she revealed that she had fractured her neck while playing on a trampoline with her daughter. She stated that she narrowly avoided death and paralysis, and later underwent surgery for herniated disks caused by this accident. She went on to announce a seven-city October tour for Woman Evolve.

She was named to the Time 100 Next in 2023. Her profile was written by Tyler Perry. A show about her and her husband was set to be produced by Kerry Washington, and she was set to be played by Kelly Jenrette; however, it was not greenlit by ABC. She is signed to WME Group. As of 2022, she had more than 2 million Instagram followers.

== Bibliography ==
- Roberts, Sarah Jakes (2014). Lost and Found: Finding Hope in the Detours of Life. Bethany House. ISBN 9780764216992.
- — (2015). Dear Mary: Lessons from the Mother of Jesus for the Modern Mom. Bethany House. ISBN 9780764217470.
- — (2017). Don’t Settle for Safe: Embracing the Uncomfortable to Become Unstoppable. Thomas Nelson. ISBN 9780718081966.
- — (2021). Woman Evolve: Break Up with Your Fears and Revolutionize Your Life. Thomas Nelson. ISBN 9780785235545.
- — (2023). All Hope Is Found: Rediscovering the Joy of Expectation. Thomas Nelson. ISBN 9781400339891.
- — (2024). Power Moves: Ignite Your Confidence and Become a Force. Thomas Nelson. ISBN 9780785291909.
- — (2026). The Power In Surrender: 100 Ways to Tap Into the Courage to Trust God’s Plan Over Fear, Worry, and Doubt. Thomas Nelson. ISBN 9781400236923.
- — (2027). Get Over Yourself: Relief from Perfection and the Lies that Keep You from Connection. Thomas Nelson. ISBN 9780785291961.
