= Oprah Prime =

- Also known as: Oprah's Next Chapter
- Presented by: Oprah Winfrey
- Country of origin: United States
- Original language: English
- No. of seasons: 3
- No. of episodes: 85 (list of episodes)

Production
- Executive producers: Andrea Wishom; Tara Montgomery
- Producers: Veronica Votypka; Jenna Kostelnik; A. Chris Gajilan
- Running time: 42 minutes
- Production company: Harpo Studios

Original release
- Network: Oprah Winfrey Network
- Release: January 1, 2012 – January 4, 2015

Related
- The Oprah Winfrey Show; Oprah's Lifeclass

Oprah Prime (formerly Oprah's Next Chapter) is an American prime-time television series hosted and produced by Oprah Winfrey, airing on Oprah Winfrey Network. The series premiered on January 1, 2012, with a two-part episode featuring Aerosmith frontman Steven Tyler. The third season brought a new series title, Oprah Prime, and premiered on March 9, 2014.

== Background ==
Oprah Prime is an interview program that allows Oprah Winfrey to step "outside of the studio for some riveting, enlightening in-depth conversations with newsmakers, celebrities, thought leaders and real-life families." The decision to launch Oprah Prime was made after Oprah reflected on her 25 years on television. "After 25 years I got myself out of the studio chairs. I moved into the next chapter, and I am having more fun than ever – moving around the country and the world talking to people I’m really interested in getting to know and I think viewers will be, too," said Winfrey. "It is so energizing to be out and about in the world exploring new people, new places and new ideas."

== Series overview ==
Season	Episodes	Originally released	
Season	Episodes	First released	Last released
1	29	January 1, 2012	July 15, 2012
2	47	July 22, 2012	December 8, 2013
3	9	March 9, 2014	January 4, 2015

=== Season 1 (2012) ===
Season 1 of Oprah's Next Chapter debuted on OWN: Oprah Winfrey Network on Sunday January 1, 2012 at 9:00 p.m. ET with a two-part series premiere featuring Aerosmith frontman Steven Tyler.

Throughout the first season, Oprah interviews Aerosmith's Steven Tyler at his New Hampshire home; journeys to Haiti with Sean Penn nearly two years after a devastating earthquake took the lives of more than 300,000 people; tours Skywalker Ranch with George Lucas as her personal guide; has a slumber party at Southern chef Paula Deen's Georgia estate; and travels to a small town in Iowa devoted to the practice of Transcendental Meditation.

On January 24, 2012, it was announced that as a result of its high ratings, Oprah's Next Chapter would be airing two nights per week in February, as two-part episodes that run one hour each.

On April 27, 2012, OWN announced that new episodes of Oprah's Next Chapter would continue airing throughout the summer. These episodes "will feature Winfrey visiting How I Met Your Mother star Neil Patrick Harris in his Los Angeles home, where she'll meet his husband-to-be and his fraternal twin babies. She'll also head to Brazil to meet with a faith healer and 'psychic surgeon.' The host will watch his controversial procedures as they're performed without anesthesia or sterilization."

=== Season 2 (2012–13) ===
Season 2 of Oprah's Next Chapter premiered on July 22, 2012, featuring an interview with 10 U.S. Olympic athletes at Oprah's home in Montecito, California. Upcoming episodes were scheduled to feature Kelsey Grammer Jennifer Hudson, Bette Midler, Stephen Colbert. Drew Barrymore, LL Cool J, and Whitney Houston's mother Cissy Houston.

On January 17 and 18, 2013, OWN broadcast a two-part special interview with former cyclist Lance Armstrong, in his first interview after being charged with use of performance-enhancing drugs. The first half of the interview was seen by 3.2 million viewers in the United States.

=== Season 3 (2014–15) ===
For season 3, which premiered on March 9, 2014, the series was renamed Oprah Prime. Network president Sheri Salata explained that "as the show has evolved into more topical conversations with newsmakers and celebrities, Oprah Prime provides a wider lens for Oprah to intimately explore topics that matter and the public figures who are making a difference, as only she can.".

== Reception ==
=== Critical reception ===
Oprah's Next Chapter debuted to generally positive reviews. Sara Vilkomerson of Entertainment Weekly stated that the premiere with Steven Tyler showcased Winfrey's trademark skills as "a master interviewer. It’s easy to take for granted, but Winfrey has both an innate ability to get celebrities to open up to her, and zero hesitation over asking tough questions." Vilkomerson further praised the show's behind-the-scenes segments and noted that the show has a more relaxed feel than The Oprah Winfrey Show, which might take some time for viewers to adjust to.

Piers Morgan also praised the show on his Facebook page, saying that it was "fantastic" and that Winfrey was "the undisputed Queen of chat".

Further, Steve Johnson of Chicago Tribune declared that Winfrey "knows how to steer a celebrity chat" and that her discussion with Tyler in the premiere was "fascinating". On the other hand, Johnson criticized the show's tendency to focus too much on the host; he posits that producers use the behind-the-scenes segments to reveal that Winfrey is the "orchestrator and validator" of the program's revealing conversations.

=== Ratings ===
The two-hour premiere of Oprah's Next Chapter gave OWN its highest ratings for a Sunday premiere since the network's January 2011 launch weekend, scoring a 1.1 rating in the network's target women 25-54 demographic and 1.1 million total viewers. To put these numbers in context, the Oprah's Next Chapter premiere represented a 463 percent increase in the demo over the network's December 2011 average in that time period. Only the premiere of Season 25: Oprah Behind the Scenes, which aired on January 1, 2011, has scored better than the Next Chapter premiere, drawing a 1.11 in the demo and 1.2 million total viewers."

According to affiliate ratings, the second week, featuring Winfrey's interview with pastor Joel Osteen, "brought in an audience of 1.6 million during its Sunday night broadcast. It marks a 45 percent growth from the series premiere, and now holds the network record of being the most-watched broadcast since its 2011 launch. It also improved among the women 25-54 demographic, adding 18 percent from the previous episode for a 1.3 rating. The series also built on its audience in the second half-hour, growing from 1.5 million to 1.6 million."

The third week of the show saw a steep decline in viewership as Winfrey's interview with Chris Christie drew in only 500,000 viewers on OWN - down over 1 million viewers from the week before. However the following week's interview with George Lucas saw a slight increase, with 557,000 viewers on OWN.

An interview with Whitney Houston's family, including her daughter Bobbi Kristina Brown, attracted 3.5 million viewers. Until the fifth episode of the second season of The Haves and the Have Nots (3.6 million viewers), it was OWN's highest-rated program to date.

=== Awards and nominations ===
Year	Award	Category	Result
2013	NAACP Image Awards	Outstanding Talk Series	Nominated
2013	GLAAD Media Awards	Outstanding Talk Show Episode ("At Home with Neil Patrick Harris, His Fiancé David Burtka, & Their Twins")	Won
2014	NAACP Image Awards	Outstanding Talk Series	Nominated
2014	GLAAD Media Awards	Outstanding Talk Show Episode ("First Openly Gay NBA Player Jason Collins and his Family")	Won
2014	20th Annual NAMIC Vision Awards	Variety/ Talk Show	Won
2015	NAACP Image Awards	Outstanding Talk Series	Nominated
2015	GLAAD Media Awards	Outstanding Talk Show Episode ("Michael Sam")	Nominated
2015	21st Annual NAMIC Vision Awards	Variety/ Talk Show ("Pharrell Williams")	Won
2016	NAACP Image Awards	Outstanding News/ Information- Series Or Special ("Celebrating Dr. King and the Selma Marches 50 Years Later")	Nominated
2016	22nd Annual NAMIC Vision Awards	Variety/ Talk Show	Won
