= Paul Osteen =

American surgeon and medical missionary

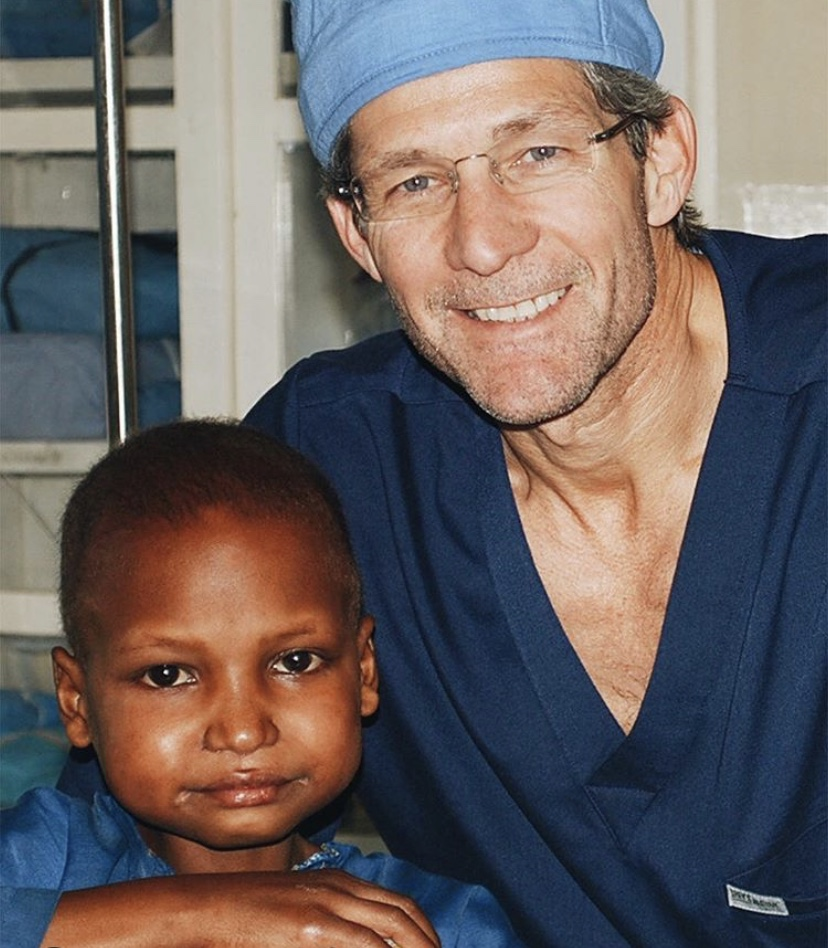
- Osteen with a patient in a remote Kenyan hospital.

Personal life
- Born: Paul Kent Osteen; November 16, 1955 (age 70) Houston, Texas
- Education: Oral Roberts University (BS, MD)
- Relatives: Joel Osteen (brother); John Osteen (father)

Religious life
- Religion: Christianity

Senior posting
- Post: Associate Pastor (Lakewood Church)

Paul Kent Osteen (born November 16, 1955) is an American vascular surgeon and medical missionary. Osteen practices both as a volunteer surgeon in remote parts of Sub-Saharan Africa and as an advocate for humanitarian action by US physicians to under-served and desperate areas specifically in Africa. He is the older brother of Pastor Joel Osteen.

== Early life ==
Osteen was born in Houston, Texas, and is one of six children of John Osteen (1921 – 1999) and Dolores ("Dodie") Pilgrim (1933 – 2025), founders of Lakewood Church. He has five siblings including his younger brother, current pastor Joel Osteen. After high school, Osteen attended Oral Roberts University in Tulsa, Oklahoma, and graduated in the first medical school class in 1982.

== Career ==
=== Private practice ===
Soon after finishing his surgical residency in Arkansas, Osteen joined a private practice in Little Rock. Osteen stayed at the practice for 20 years before transitioning back to his home in Houston to help his brother Joel take over as pastor of Lakewood. After a medical mission trip in 2005, Osteen felt compelled to use his trained surgery skills to help others who lack access to medical care.

=== Humanitarian work ===
Osteen ended his private career in 2005, instead choosing to address the lack of basic surgical care for those in Sub-Saharan Africa. Partnering alongside Christian aid-organizations like Samaritan's Purse and World Vision, Osteen travels to rural parts of Zambia and Kenya to provide surgical care, deliver medical equipment, and train new doctors for communities otherwise isolated from healthcare.

In an interview about the role of the church in the fight against medical poverty, Osteen says:

“We, as the American church, can’t get so insulated that we forget poor, suffering people,” Paul says. “If we in the church become so religious we look the other way, it’s a sad thing.”

Osteen also serves on teams that respond to immediate disasters, like the Iraq refugee crisis, and often travels to areas suffering immediately after catastrophic events transpire.

=== Advocacy ===
Osteen founded a medical conference for missionary work, called the M3 Conference, in 2016. The goal of the conference is to connect medical workers with organizations working to relieve poverty in least developed countries.

== Personal life ==
Osteen married Jennifer Osteen in 1994 and they have four children.
