= Lakewood Church =

Coordinates: 29°43′48″N 95°26′4″W

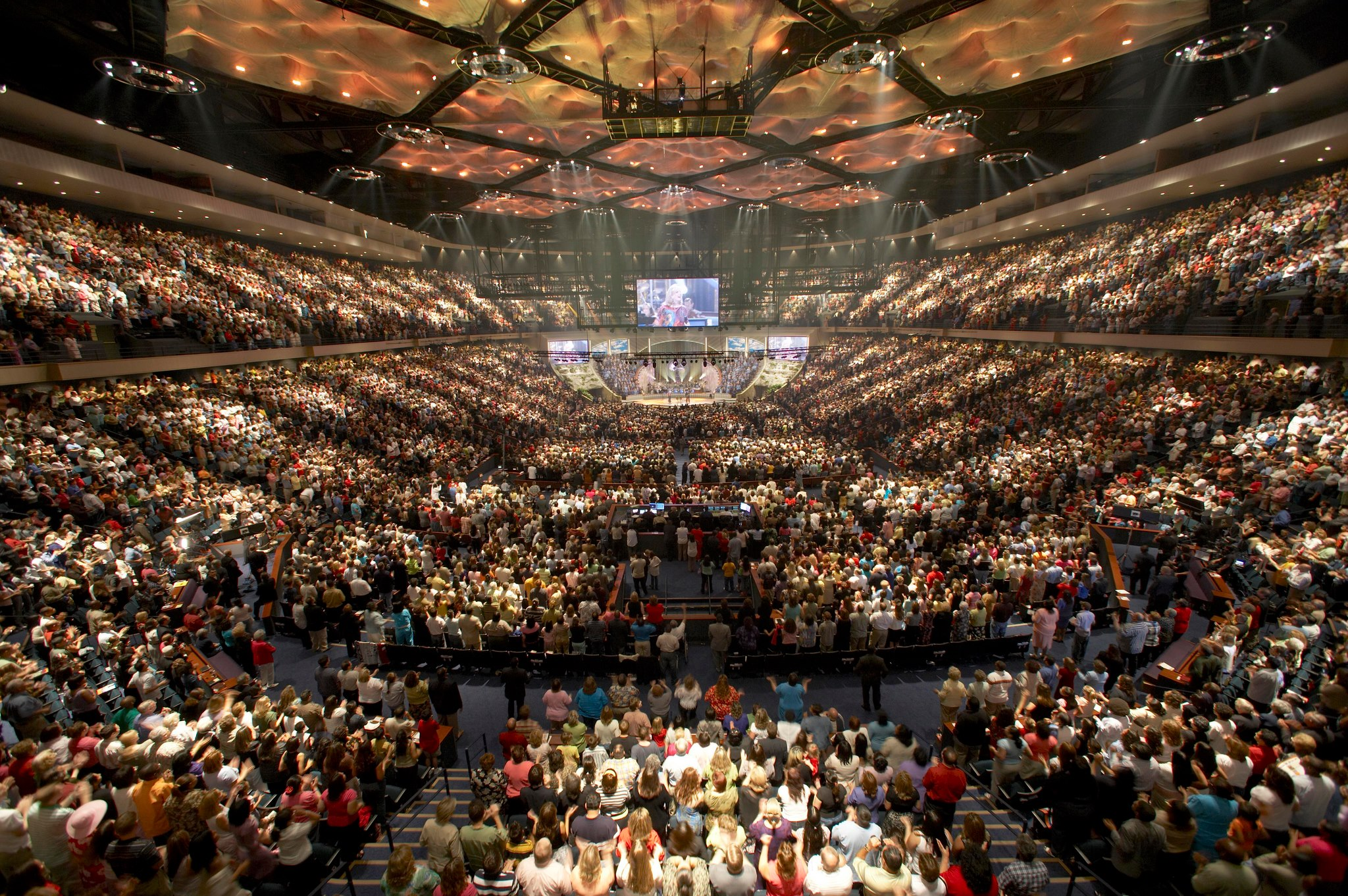
- Worship in 2013
- Lakewood Church
- Location: Houston, Texas
- Country: United States
- Denomination: Both Pentecostal (since 1979) and Word of Faith (since 1999)
- Previous denomination: Baptist (from 1959 until 1961); Non-denominational Christianity (from 1961 until 1979)
- Website: www.lakewoodchurch.com

History
- Founded: May 10, 1959; 67 years ago
- Founder(s): John Osteen and Dolores Osteen

Specifications
- Capacity: 16,800

Clergy
- Pastor(s): Nick Nilson, Dr. Paul Osteen, Craig Johnson, Lisa Osteen Comes

Lakewood Church is an evangelical Pentecostal and Word of Faith megachurch located in Houston, Texas. It was formerly a Baptist church from 1959 until 1961, and a non-denominational Christian church from 1961 to 1979. It is among the largest congregations in the United States, averaging about 45,000 attendees per week. The 16,800-seat Lakewood Church building, home to four English-language services and two Spanish-language services per week, was previously a sports arena, home to the Houston Rockets. Joel Osteen is the senior pastor of Lakewood Church with his wife, Victoria, who serves as co-pastor.

== History ==
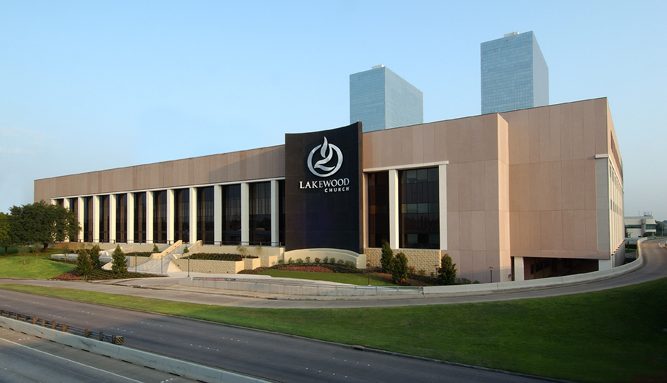
Current building in Houston

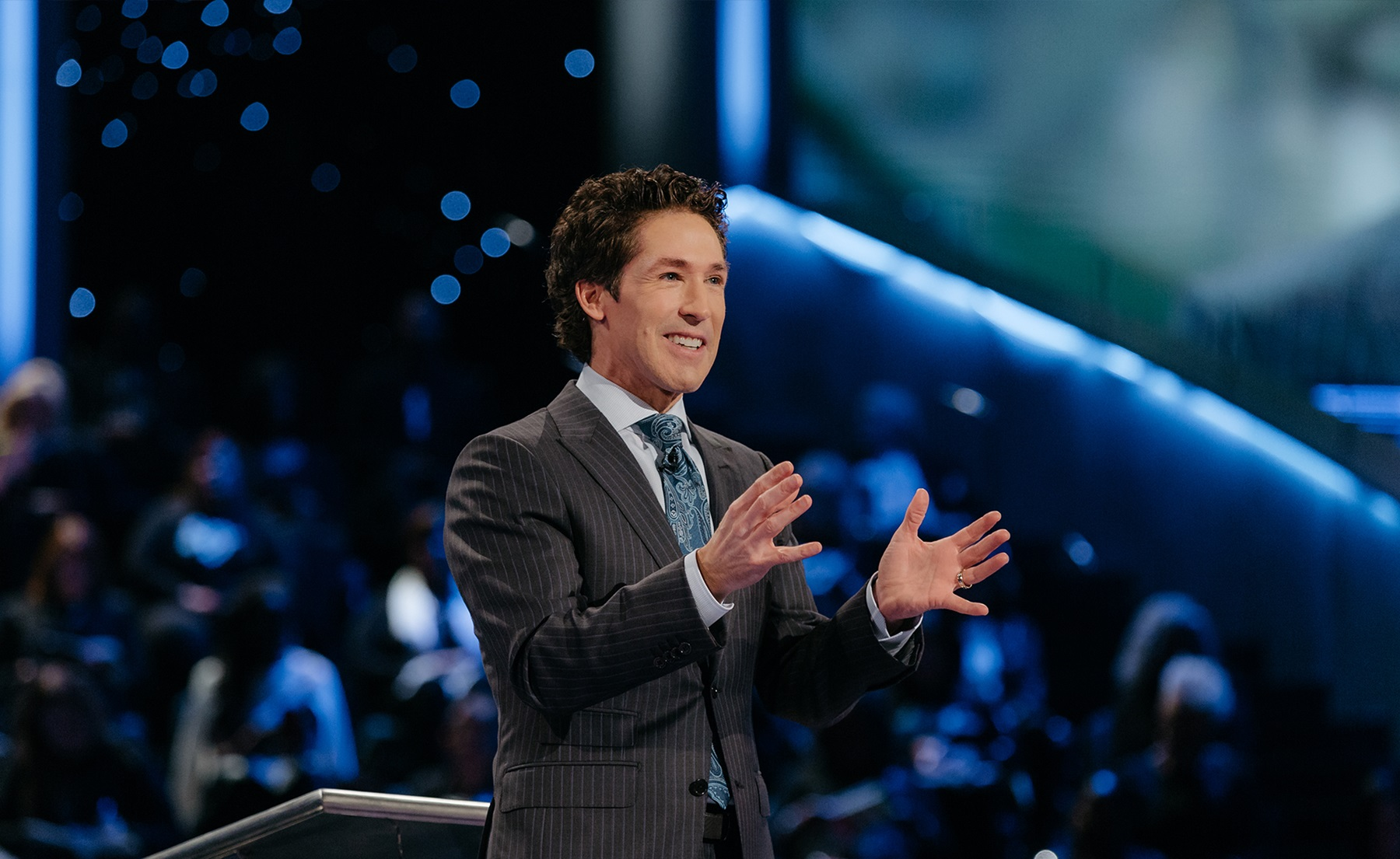
Joel Osteen at Lakewood Church, September 21, 2018

Lakewood Church, originally called Lakewood Baptist Church, was founded by John Osteen and his second wife, Dolores (Dodie) on Mother's Day, May 10, 1959, in a tent. The church then moved to an abandoned feed store in northeast Houston. John was a Southern Baptist minister, but after experiencing baptism in the Holy Spirit, he founded Lakewood as a church for charismatic Baptists. The church soon dropped "Baptist" from its name and became nondenominational. In 1961, John Osteen left the church and was called to missions. Marvin Crow became the pastor in his absence until John returned in 1969. In 1972, Lakewood broke ground for a new building that seated 700 people. By 1979, attendance was over 5,000, and the church was becoming prominent among Pentecostals and charismatics. John and Dodie created and hosted Lakewood's weekly television program, which could be seen in 100 countries worldwide. On February 15, 1987, a groundbreaking was held for a new 8,000–seat sanctuary, which was completed in April 1988.

Following John Osteen's death on January 23, 1999, his youngest son, Joel Osteen, became the pastor in October 1999.

In 2001, Tropical Storm Allison caused flooding in the Houston area. Lakewood Church was opened as a shelter to approximately 5,000 displaced persons.

Under Joel Osteen, Lakewood's congregation increased almost fivefold. Attendance increased to 30,000 weekly, prompting a move from its location at 7317 East Houston Road to a larger facility. In late 2003, the church signed a long-term lease with the city of Houston to acquire the Compaq Center, a 29-year-old former sports arena.

Lakewood Church relocated to the Compaq Center on July 16, 2005. It is a 16,800-seat facility in southwest downtown Houston along U.S. Highway 59, that has twice the capacity of its former sanctuary. The church was required to pay $11.8 million in rent in advance for the first thirty years of the lease. Lakewood renovated the new campus at an estimated cost of $100 million in loans, which was paid off in 2024.

The church received $15 million after selling the former building to New Light Christian Center Church. On March 31, 2010, the Houston City Council voted 13–2 to sell the property to Lakewood for $7.5 million.

In November 2018, CBS News listed Lakewood Church as the largest megachurch in the United States with about 43,500 weekly visitors.

On December 3, 2021, national news services reported that a plumber found cash and checks within a wall behind a toilet that was being repaired. They may have been related to a 2014 incident in which $600,000 in cash and checks disappeared from a safe.

According to a church census published in 2024, Lakewood had a weekly attendance of 45,000 people.

=== Shooting ===
On February 11, 2024, a woman with a history of mental health issues, Genesse Ivonne Moreno, accompanied by her 7-year-old son, entered the church between services and began firing an AR-15. Two off-duty police officers who were working as security returned fire and killed her. Her son was critically injured with a gunshot to the head during the exchange of gunfire. Another man who was present was wounded in the hip, treated at a local hospital and released.

== Beliefs ==
Lakewood Church believes that the entire Bible is inspired by God, and the church bases its teachings on this belief. The church also believes in the Trinity, and recognizes the death of Christ on the cross and his resurrection.

The church practices the following, believing them to be commanded in the Bible:

- The pursuit of Salvation: Each service offers an Altar call at the end in order for people to accept Christ as Lord and Savior.
- Water baptism: The church believes the Bible asks for this as a symbol and a testimony to faith in Jesus Christ – in "his cleansing power through his shedding of blood on the cross for us." Baptism is practiced every Saturday night in the church's Chapel.
- Communion: The church believes the Bible asks for this act of remembering the death of Jesus on the cross. It is offered every week in the New Beginnings room (just down from the bookstore).
- The seeking of a growing relationship with Jesus Christ: Lakewood believes that every believer should be in a growing relationship with Jesus by obeying the rules laid out in the Bible, yielding to the Holy Spirit and by being conformed to the teachings of Jesus Christ.

Lakewood Church is known for its Word of Faith teaching rooted in the Bible. It is also known, before every sermon, for a creed (originally led by John and continued by Joel) which the congregation repeats in unison.

== Church organization ==
Lakewood offers different types of ministries, fellowships, and services depending on the age, marital status, and need of its members.

=== Services ===
- Kidslife: Children
- Champions Club for Special Needs
- Lakewood Next Gen: Middle School, High School, and Young Adults
- Main Service: all adults

During weekend services, Joel Osteen, Victoria Osteen, or Danilo Montero preach. On Wednesday nights, associate pastors Paul Osteen, Lisa Osteen Comes, Nick Nilson, and Craig Johnson, or guest speakers preach.

=== Education ===
Various classes are offered through the Compass Classes ministry, meeting before and after weekend services.

=== Television ===
The church's weekly services are broadcast on Trinity Broadcasting Network and Daystar Television Network, as well as local channels in most major U.S. markets. Lakewood also appears on secular networks, such as Fox Network, Freeform, and USA Network. In 2007, Lakewood reported spending nearly $30 million every year on its television ministry. Osteen's sermons are also televised in more than 100 countries, with an estimated 7 million viewers each week. Lakewood also hosts a Night of Hope every month. This is when the church hosts a Christian service event in one of the arenas or stadiums all across America.

=== Hispanic ministry ===
In 2002, Lakewood began a Hispanic ministry, Iglesia Lakewood, founded by Hispanic Pastor Marcos Witt and his wife, Miriam Witt. In September 2012, Danilo and Gloriana Montero assumed the role of associate pastors for the Hispanic ministry. Lakewood has two services each week in Spanish and translates all English services into Spanish. The weekly attendance at the Spanish services is approximately 6,000 people.

=== Charitable work ===
Since 2016, Lakewood Church organizes an annual Mobilizing Medical Missions Conference to equip doctors for on-field medical missions. The church has been active during natural disasters by organizing food distribution programs and blood donation drives during COVID 19, providing shelter services during Hurricane Ida and 2021 Texas Freeze, and serving as a distribution center for essential supplies during Hurricane Harvey.

== Criticism ==
=== Prosperity gospel ===
Osteen's sermons and writings are noted for promoting prosperity theology, a belief that material gain is a reward for pious Christians. When asked if he is a prosperity teacher, Osteen responded that if prosperity means God wants people to be blessed and healthy and have good relationships, then he considers himself a prosperity teacher, but if it is about money, he does not. He has specifically stated that he never preaches about money because of the reputation of televangelists. In an interview with The Christian Post on April 21, 2013, Osteen expressed his sentiments on being perceived as being part of the prosperity gospel. "I get grouped into the prosperity gospel and I never think it's fair, but it's just what it is. I think prosperity, and I've said it 1,000 times, it's being healthy, it's having great children, it's having peace of mind. Money is part of it; and yes, I believe God wants us to excel ... to be blessed so we can be a bigger blessing to others. I feel very rewarded. I wrote a book and sold millions of copies; and Victoria and I were able to help more people than we ever dreamed of. But when I hear the term prosperity gospel, I think people are sometimes saying, 'Well, he's just asking for money'." On October 14, 2007, 60 Minutes ran a twelve-minute segment on Osteen, titled "Joel Osteen Answers his Critics", during which Reformed theologian Michael Horton told CBS News correspondent Byron Pitts that Osteen's message is heresy. Horton stated that the problem with Osteen's message is that it makes religion about us instead of about God. According to the Houston Chronicle, Lakewood Church’s income was $89 million in the year ending March 2017, more than 90 percent raised from church followers. More than 70 percent of its budget was spent on television broadcasts, weekly services, and a travelling show, while only around $1.2 million went to charitable causes.

=== Slow response to Hurricane Harvey ===
During the immediate aftermath of Hurricane Harvey in 2017, Osteen received significant criticism in response to not making Lakewood Church, a 606,000-square-foot (56,300 m^{2}), 16,000 seat, former basketball arena, available as an emergency shelter for those displaced by the storm. On August 27, posts from the church and a Lakewood Church associate pastor's social media accounts stated that the church was "inaccessible due to severe flooding," and associate pastor John Gray posting further, "If WE could get there WE WOULD OPEN THE DOORS." However the area was not under flood warning and photos and videos posted on social media appeared to counter the church's claim. In a subsequent interview, Osteen denied the claim that the church was closed during the flood, saying "the church has been open from the beginning," and, "We've always been open … How this notion got started, that we're not a shelter and we're not taking people in is a false narrative." He also said that "On the evening of August 28, it was announced by Lakewood that it would open at noon the next day as an available shelter, opening to storm victims and emergency personnel on August 29".

On August 15, 2018, the City of Houston and Mayor Sylvester Turner proclaimed a "Lakewood Church Day" in honor of Lakewood's assistance in reconstruction efforts across the Houston area. It stated Lakewood has provided "assistance to more than 1,150 Houston-area families whose homes were damaged or destroyed by floodwaters," and bought "1.1 million dollars in building materials, furniture, appliances, and paid labor, as well as through the contribution of more than 2,500 volunteers."

== See also ==
- Christianity in Houston
- List of the largest churches in the US
- List of the largest evangelical churches
- List of the largest evangelical church auditoriums
