= John Osteen =

American pastor (1921–1999)

- Title: Founder and senior pastor, Lakewood Church in Houston, Texas

Personal life
- Born: John Hillery Osteen; August 21, 1921 Paris, Texas, U.S.
- Died: January 23, 1999 (aged 77) Houston, Texas, U.S.
- Spouse: Emma Jean Shaffer (divorced) Dolores (Dodie) Pilgrim (m. 1954)
- Children: 6, including Paul and Joel
- Occupation: Pastor, author, televangelist
- Website: lakewoodchurch.com

Religious life
- Religion: Non-denominational Christianity (Word of Faith movement)
- Church: Lakewood Church

Senior posting
- Period in office: 1959–1999

John Hillery Osteen (August 21, 1921 – January 23, 1999) was an American pastor who founded Lakewood Church in Houston, Texas. His television program ran for 16 years and was broadcast to millions in the U.S. and nearly 50 countries weekly.

== Life and work ==
Osteen was born in Paris, Texas. He earned a bachelor's degree from John Brown University in Siloam Springs, Arkansas, and a master's degree from Northern Baptist Theological Seminary (NBTS). He also held a Doctor of Divinity degree from Oral Roberts University.

In his biography, Osteen said he did not begin thinking seriously about God until 1939, after leaving a nightclub he frequented. Within a couple of months, he began preaching in Paris, Texas, and was apparently ordained to the gospel ministry shortly before his 18th birthday by a church affiliated with the Southern Baptist Convention. He served as an Associate Pastor at First Baptist Church in San Diego, California, after completing his studies at NBTS and by the late 1940s as a minister at First Baptist Church, Hamlin, Texas. Osteen left Hamlin in 1948 to become an itinerant preacher, but within a year he became pastor of Central Baptist Church, Baytown, Texas.

During his pastorate of Central Baptist Church, Osteen and his first wife, Emma Jean Shaffer, began to experience marital unrest and subsequently divorced. He married Dolores "Dodie" Pilgrim on September 17, 1954, and the following year resigned his pastorate. They remained together until Osteen’s death. Dodie herself would die on July 30, 2025, at the age of 91, according to a statement from their son, Joel. Before long, Osteen again entered pastoral ministry at Hibbard Memorial Baptist Church, Houston, Texas, but left in 1958.

That same year, John and Dodie's first daughter Lisa was born with severe health issues. As he wrestled with her circumstance, his theological beliefs began to shift and he had ecstatic religious experiences, based on the baptism of the Holy Ghost. A year later, on Mother's Day, May 10, 1959, he and Dodie started Lakewood Baptist Church in "a dusty, abandoned feed store" in northeast Houston as a church for charismatic Baptists. The church soon dropped "Baptist" from its name and became nondenominational.

In the mid-1980s, Osteen launched the Lakewood Bible Institute (LBI), an "unaccredited school devoted to biblical training from a charismatic perspective." LBI offered a variety of classes including principles of Bible study, healing, conversion, and prayer. Osteen served as LBI's president until its closure in the late-1980s.

=== Lakewood Church ===
Osteen founded Lakewood Church in 1959 in Houston, Texas, and developed Lakewood into a body of approximately 15,000 members with active ministries in televangelism, conferences, missionary support, and food distribution. He hosted the weekly John Osteen television program for 16 years, reaching millions in the U.S. and in many other countries with his preaching. On January 23, 1999, he died after a heart attack at the age of 77. His youngest son Joel Osteen later became the pastor, who has expanded his father's church. Lakewood now receives over 52,000 in attendance and reaches millions of people around the world by television and online.
