= Iyanla Vanzant =

American writer

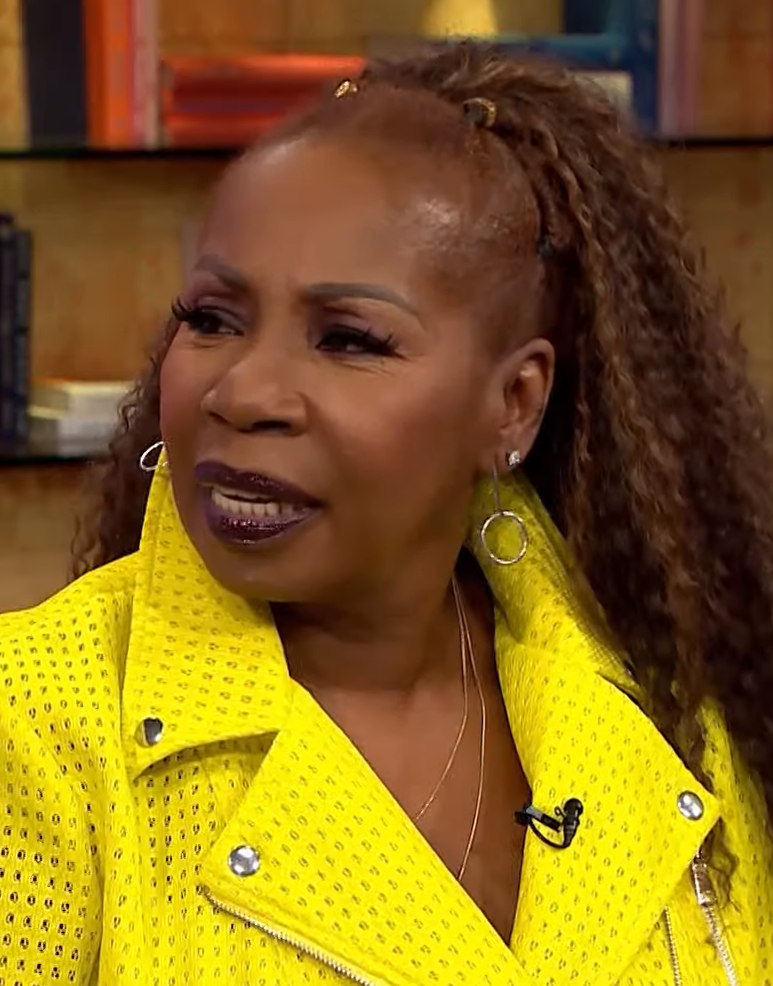
- Vanzant in 2019
- Born: Rhonda Eva Harris; September 13, 1953 (age 73); New York City, U.S.
- Education: City University of New York, Medgar Evers; Virginia Union University (BA); Queens College, City University of New York (JD); University of Santa Monica (MA)
- Occupations: Inspirational speaker, lawyer, spiritual teacher, author, TV personality
- Years active: 1980–present
- Children: 3
- Website: www.iyanla.com

Iyanla Vanzant (born Rhonda Eva Harris; September 13, 1953) is an American inspirational speaker, lawyer, New Thought spiritual teacher, author, life coach, and television personality. She is known primarily for her books, her eponymous talk show, and her appearances on The Oprah Winfrey Show. From 2012 to 2021, she served as host of OWN's Iyanla: Fix My Life.

== Life and career ==
Vanzant was born on September 13, 1953, in the back of a taxi in Brooklyn, New York, as Rhonda Eva Harris. She is the daughter of Sarah Jefferson, a railroad carmaid, and Horace Harris. Her mother died from breast cancer in 1955, when she was two. She was then raised by paternal relatives. Her first husband was physically abusive and she left him in 1980, taking her three children. In 1983, she was given the title "Iyanla", which means "great mother", after being initiated and ordained as a priestess in the Yoruba tradition (as mentioned in her television interview on the Conn Jackson show). She attended Medgar Evers College and Virginia Union University. Vanzant holds a Juris Doctor degree from the City University of New York School of Law and a Master's degree from the University of Santa Monica (USM), Center for the Study and Practice of Spiritual Psychology. She currently resides in Upper Marlboro, Maryland. She is also an ordained New Thought minister.

In 2000, she was named one of the "100 most influential Black Americans" by Ebony magazine, which said that "Her books, lectures and television appearances have made her a multimedia high priestess of healthy relationships." In 2012, Vanzant was listed at #7 on Watkins' Mind Body Spirit magazine's list of the 100 most spiritually influential living people. In 2014, she was a co-speaker on Oprah's the "Life You Want Weekend" tour, which travelled to eight cities and also featured Deepak Chopra, Mark Nepo, Elizabeth Gilbert, and Rob Bell. In 2016, Vanzant was named to Oprah Winfrey's SuperSoul100 list of visionaries and influential leaders.

Vanzant is an honorary member of Alpha Kappa Alpha sorority. On Christmas Day 2003, Vanzant's 30-year-old daughter, Gemmia, died from a rare form of colon cancer. On July 30, 2023, Vanzant announced that her youngest daughter Nisa had died. Vanzant and her husband, Yemi, divorced in 2007.

== Filmography and bibliography ==
- Interiors: a black woman's healing--in progress. Writers and Readers, 1995. ISBN 0-86316-321-1.
- The Big Book of Faith. Simon & Schuster, 1997. ISBN 0-684-84999-2.
- The spirit of a man: a vision of transformation for Black men and the women who love them. HarperSanFrancisco, 1997. ISBN 0-06-251239-0.
- Acts of Faith 1998: Thought-for-a-Day. Simon & Schuster, 1997. ISBN 0-684-82411-6.
- Faith in the Valley: Lessons for Women on the Journey to Peace. Simon & Schuster, 1998. ISBN 0-684-85048-6.
- Don't Give It Away!: A Workbook of Self-Awareness and Self-Affirmations for Young Women. with Almasi Wilcots. Simon & Schuster, 1999. ISBN 0-684-85048-6.
- Yesterday, I Cried: Celebrating the Lessons of Living and Loving. Simon & Schuster, 1999. ISBN 0-684-87382-6.
- One Day My Soul Just Opened Up: 40 Days And 40 Nights Toward Spiritual Strength And Personal Growth. Simon & Schuster, 1999. ISBN 0-684-87383-4.
- In the Meantime: Finding Yourself and the Love You Want. Simon & Schuster, 2000. ISBN 0-684-86581-5.
- Acts of Faith: Meditations for People of Color. Simon & Schuster, 2001. ISBN 0-7432-2646-1.
- Value in the Valley: A Black Woman's Guide Through Life's Dilemmas. Simon & Schuster, 2001. ISBN 0-7432-2647-X.
- Living through the meantime: learning to break the patterns of the past and begin the healing process. Simon & Schuster, 2001. ISBN 0743227107.
- Iyanla Vanzant. Simon & Schuster, Limited, 2001. ISBN 0-7432-2171-0.
- Until Today. Hay House Inc, 2002. ISBN 1-56170-924-7.
- Tips for Daily Living Cards: A 50-Card Deck. Hay House Inc, 2002. ISBN 1-56170-939-5.
- Every Day I Pray: Prayers for Awakening to the Grace of Inner Communion. Pocket, 2002. ISBN 0-7434-5074-4.
- Up From Here: Reclaiming the Male Spirit: A Guide to Transforming Emotions Into Power and Freedom. HarperCollins, 2003. ISBN 0-06-052250-X.
- Tapping the Power Within: A Path to Self-Empowerment for Women. Hay House, Inc, 2008. ISBN 1-4019-2188-4.
- A Woman Knows Things. Hay House UK, Limited, 2010. ISBN 1-4019-2192-2.
- Peace from Broken Pieces: How to Get Through What You're Going Through. Hay House, Inc, 2010. ISBN 1-4019-2822-6.
- Girls Trip Guest appearance
- Trust: Mastering The 4 Essentials

=== Television ===
- Iyanla (TV Series), Host (2001–2002)
- Starting Over, Life Coach (Seasons 2 and 3) (2004–2006)
- Oprah's Lifeclass, Lifeclass Teacher, OWN: Oprah Winfrey Network (2011–2014), Winner of the Primetime Emmy Awards (2012–2013)
- Iyanla, Fix My Life, Host, OWN: Oprah Winfrey Network (2012–2021)

=== TV guest appearances ===
- 'Tavis Smiley' (29 April 2004) playing herself
- Moesha (8 May 2000) in episode: "The Robbing Hood" (episode # 5.20) playing herself
- The Chris Rock Show (8 October 1999) playing herself
- The Oprah Winfrey Show (20 appearances from early 1998 through mid 1999)
- The Salt-N-Pepa Show (February 2008)
- The Oprah Winfrey Show (16 and 23 February 2011, discussing her departure from Harpo Productions in 1999)
- Super Soul Sunday (9 and 16 September 2012)
- Katie (27 September 2012)
- Anderson Live (9 November 2012)
- Joy Behar: Say Anything! (21 November 2012)
- The Dr. Oz Show (8 April 2013)
- Oprah Prime (29 November 2014)
- Super Soul Sunday (26 April 2016)
- Greenleaf (3 October 2018) in Season 3 Episode 6: "She Changes Everything"
- Braxton Family Values Two Episodes 2018

== Awards and nominations ==
=== Emmy Awards ===
Year	Category	Work	Result
Daytime Emmys
2005	Outstanding Special Class Series	Starting Over	Won
2006	Outstanding Special Class Series	Starting Over	Nominated
2007	Outstanding Special Class Series	Starting Over	Nominated

=== NAACP Image Awards ===
Year	Category	Work	Result
2014	Outstanding Reality Series	Iyanla: Fix My Life	Won
2015	Outstanding Reality Series	Iyanla: Fix My Life	Won
2016	Outstanding Reality Series / Reality Competition Series	Iyanla: Fix My Life	Nominated
2017	Outstanding Reality Series / Reality Competition Series	Iyanla: Fix My Life	Won
2018	Outstanding Reality Series / Reality Competition Series	Iyanla: Fix My Life	Nominated
2019	Outstanding Reality Series / Reality Competition Series	Iyanla: Fix My Life	Won
2019	Outstanding Host in a Reality / Reality Competition, Game Show or Variety (Series or Special) – Individual or Ensemble	Iyanla: Fix My Life	Nominated
2020	Outstanding Host in a Reality / Reality Competition, Game Show or Variety (Series or Special) – Individual or Ensemble	Iyanla: Fix My Life	Nominated
2020	Outstanding Reality Series / Reality Competition Series	Iyanla: Fix My Life	Nominated
2021	Outstanding Reality Program, Reality Competition or Game Show (Series)	Iyanla: Fix My Life	Nominated
2021	Outstanding Host in a Reality / Reality Competition, Game Show or Variety (Series or Special) – Individual or Ensemble	Iyanla: Fix My Life	Nominated
2025	Outstanding Lifestyle/Self-Help Podcast	The R Spot with Iyanla	Nominated
