= The Potter's House (Dallas) =

Coordinates: 32.708259°N 96.939653°W

- The Potter's House
- Location: 6777 W Kiest Blvd, Dallas, Texas
- Country: United States
- Denomination: Non-denominational

History
- Founder: T. D. Jakes

Clergy
- Pastor: Sarah Jakes Roberts

The Potter's House, also known as The House Church, is a megachurch in Dallas, Texas, founded by T. D. Jakes. In 2008, Outreach magazine ranked it the 10th largest church in the United States, based on a weekly attendance of 17,000 and a capacity of about 8,000. It is currently co-headed by Jakes' daughter Sarah Jakes Roberts and son-in-law Touré Roberts.

== History ==
The church building was established by televangelist W. V. Grant as the Eagles Nest Family Church. It is located in the Oak Cliff area of Dallas right next to Dallas Baptist University. After Grant was convicted of tax evasion in 1996 he sold the facility to T. D. Jakes, a fellow televangelist, who renamed it and relaunched it as The Potter's House. Jakes had moved from West Virginia with 50 families, who formed the nucleus of the new congregation.

To handle expansion, the church built a 191,000-square-foot (17,700 m^{2}) sanctuary at a cost of $45 million, paying off the debt in four years. The auditorium was completed in August 2000 and features cascade seating, a large stage, a choir loft that can seat 450 and a state-of-the-art audio-visual system. The sanctuary seats about 7,600 people and is also used for non-church events such as graduations, concerts and corporate presentations. By 2000, Jakes was holding three services every Sunday, with attendance of over 23,000 in the sanctuary and the overflow room.

In December 2009, the church held its New Year's Eve Watch Night service at its main worship center, but also let people watch the service by satellite at the Fort Worth Convention Center and the North Church in Carrollton. As of 2010 the church had 30,000 members and five campuses in Dallas, Fort Worth, North Dallas, Denver, and Los Angeles.

The Fort Worth campus was opened in March 2010, initially meeting at the Fort Worth Convention Center. The campuses are linked by Satellite video. The Denver campus, formerly the Heritage Christian Center is led by Bishop Jakes’ daughter, Lady Sarah Jakes Roberts, and her husband, Pastor Toure’ Roberts, who is also the senior pastor of The Potter's House One Church location in Los Angeles.

In November 2018, CBS News listed The Potter's House as the 25th largest megachurch in the United States with about 16,140 weekly visitors.

On April 27, 2025, Jakes announced that he was passing on the leadership of the church to his daughter and son-in-law, Sarah Jakes Roberts and Touré Roberts.

== Activities ==
In May 2008, a church service was attended by a contingent from Soulforce, an organization that pushes for more inclusion of gay people in churches. However, the church insists that marriage is a union between a man and woman as stated in the Bible. The church runs a program for ex-offenders trying to find their feet after being released from jail, helping them to find jobs and housing and to deal with substance abuse problems.

The church has programs for teenage mothers, abused women and the homeless, runs a GED literacy program and an outreach for substance abusers, and has an AIDS ministry. In July 2010, the church began collaboration with the Palmer Theological Seminary in Pennsylvania, through a program under which seminary students would gain practical experience at the Potter's House as part of their studies.

The church, a non-profit organization, employs nearly 400 people in positions such as finance, human resources, information technology, materials distribution, public relations, publications, and television production. Initiatives include a non-profit corporation that fosters economic growth in underserved communities, a school and a housing project for single families and seniors. The church has provided aid and sent missionaries to places such as Belize, Mexico, Guyana and Kenya.

== See also ==
- List of megachurches in the United States
