= T. D. Jakes =

American preacher (born 1957)

Bishop T. D. Jakes
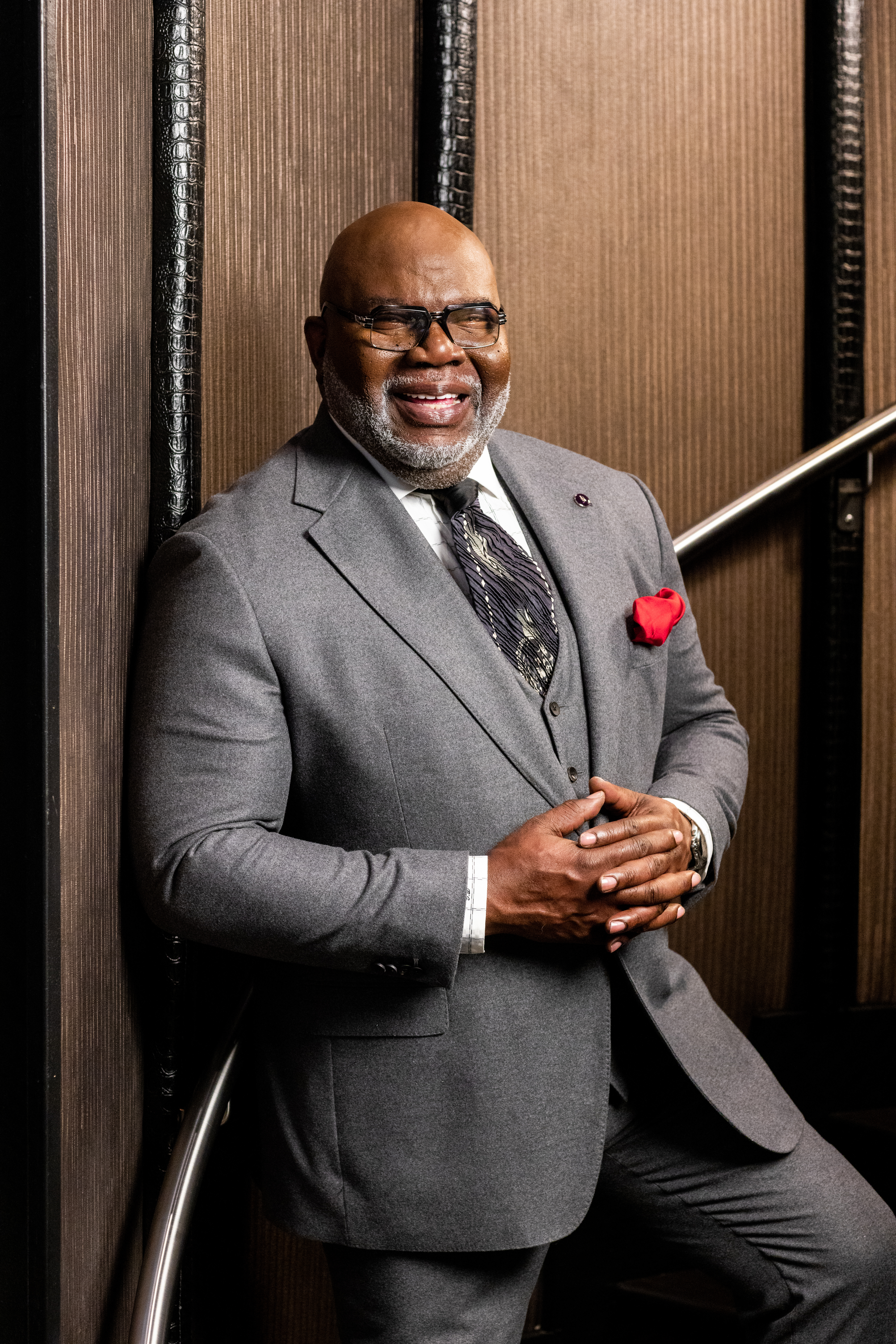
- Jakes in 2022
- Born: Thomas Dexter Jakes; June 9, 1957 (age 69); South Charleston, West Virginia, U.S.
- Occupations: Preacher; author; filmmaker
- Spouse: Serita Jamison (m. 1982)

Ecclesiastical career
- Religion: Nondenominational Christian
- Congregations: The Potter's House Church, Dallas, Texas
- Website: www.tdjakes.com

Thomas Dexter Jakes Sr. (born June 9, 1957) is an American non-denominational Christian evangelical pastor and motivational speaker. He was the senior pastor of The Potter's House, a non-denominational American megachurch in Dallas, Texas, from 1996 to 2025. Jakes' church services and evangelistic sermons are broadcast on The Potter's Touch. He is the author of many books and also produces films.

== Early life ==
Thomas Dexter Jakes was born on June 9, 1957, in South Charleston, West Virginia, and grew up in the Vandalia neighborhood in Charleston, West Virginia.

== Career ==
In 1982, at age 25, Jakes became the pastor of Greater Emanuel Temple of Faith, a storefront church in Smithers, West Virginia, with ten members. In 1988, he joined the denomination Higher Ground Always Abounding Assemblies, a Oneness Pentecostal ministerial fellowship founded by Bishop Sherman Watkins. In 1990, Jakes moved back to South Charleston, West Virginia, and his congregation grew to 300 members. In 1993, he moved to Cross Lanes, West Virginia.

In 1995, he founded "TDJ Enterprises" which publishes his books and produces his films. From 1995 to 1996, Jakes hosted "Get Ready," a weekly radio and television show with national distribution through syndication. In 1996, Jakes, founded The Potter's House in Dallas, Texas, a non-denominational church. Located on a 34-acre hilltop campus, the Potter's House features a 5,000-seat auditorium, as well as offices for employees and staff.

In 2005, Jakes accompanied President George W. Bush on his visit to the areas devastated by Hurricane Katrina. On January 20, 2009, Jakes led the early morning prayer service for President Barack Obama at St. John's Church in Washington, D.C.

In 2009, Jakes partnered with Phil McGraw, Jay McGraw, and CBS Television Distribution to launch a syndicated, secular talk show; however, due to economic issues within the syndicated television market, the program never premiered.

In July 2015, Tegna, Inc. and Debmar-Mercury announced that a new secular talk show hosted by Jakes called T. D. Jakes would air a test run on Tegna stations in Atlanta, Cleveland, Dallas, and Minneapolis from August 17 to September 11, 2015. On May 10, 2016, Tegna announced that it would begin airing Jakes's show September 12 in over 50 markets across the country. On March 15, 2017, the talk show was cancelled due to poor ratings and low clearances.

On April 27, 2025, Jakes announced that he was passing on the leadership of the Potter's House Church to his daughter and son-in-law, Sarah Jakes Roberts and Touré Roberts.

=== Beliefs ===
Although Jakes was converted and ordained within Oneness Pentecostalism, he revealed in an interview with Mark Driscoll in 2012 that he affirms the Trinity, although Jakes did not affirm the eternality of the individual persons of the Trinity, which is denied by Oneness churches.

Jakes is an advocate of sexual abstinence and has made appearances advocating it on Good Morning America and Dr. Phil.

In 2015, Jakes stated that his views on homosexuality and LGBT rights are evolving. However, Jakes stated that his words were misinterpreted and that while he does not support same-sex marriage, he "respect[s] the rights that this country affords those that disagree".

== Media ==
=== Discography ===
- Woman Thou Art Loosed (1997)
- Live from the Potter's House (1998)
- The Storm Is Over (2001)

==== As featured artist ====
- Steve Angello - "Rejoice" (2017) (from the album Human)

=== Selected writings ===
- Before You Do: Making Great Decisions That You Won't Regret, 2008, Atria Books ISBN 978-1-4165-4728-0
- The Memory Quilt: A Christmas Story for Our Times, 2009
- Let It Go: Forgive So You Can Be Forgiven, 2012
- Instinct: The Power to Unleash Your Inborn Drive, 2014, Hachette Book Group ISBN 1455554049
- Destiny: Step into Your Purpose, August 2015, Hachette Book Group ISBN 978-1-4555-5397-6
- Soar!: Build Your Vision from the Ground Up, 2017, FaithWords
- Crushing: God Turns Pressure into Power, April 2019, Hachette Book Group
- Disruptive Thinking, May 2023, FaithWords ISBN 978-1546004004

=== Filmography ===
- 2004: Woman Thou Art Loosed — As himself (based on Jakes's novel of the same name)
- 2009: Not Easily Broken — Allen (based on another Jakes novel)
- 2011: Jumping the Broom — Reverend James
- 2010: Munya — Reverend Brian
- 2012: Woman Thou Art Loosed: On the 7th Day – As himself
- 2012: Sparkle – Producer
- 2014: Heaven Is for Real – Producer
- 2014: Winnie Mandela – Producer
- 2016: Miracles from Heaven – Producer
- 2018: Faith Under Fire – Executive Producer
- 2021: Seven Deadly Sins – Executive Producer

== Legacy and honors ==
PBS Religion and Ethics Newsweekly have named Jakes among America's "Top 10 Religious Leaders." Time magazine featured Jakes on the cover of its September 17, 2001, issue with the provocative question, "Is This Man the Next Billy Graham?"

In 2003, Jakes' album A Wing and a Prayer won the "Best Gospel or Chorus Album" at the 46th Grammy Awards. He has also received Grammy and Dove Award nominations for the gospel album Live at The Potter's House. In 2004, he received the NAACP's President's Award. Jakes was selected in Oprah's SuperSoul100 list of visionaries and influential leaders in 2016.

== Personal life ==
On the PBS program African American Lives, Jakes had his DNA analyzed; his Y chromosome showed that he is descended from the Igbo people of Nigeria. According to his family history, it was suggested that he is also descended from them through his grandmother.

In November 2024, Jakes suffered a health emergency during a church service while delivering a sermon. He was later said to be "stable and under the care of medical professionals". In March 2025, after recovering, Jakes revealed that he had suffered a heart attack.
