= Joel Osteen =

American televangelist, businessman, and author (born 1963)

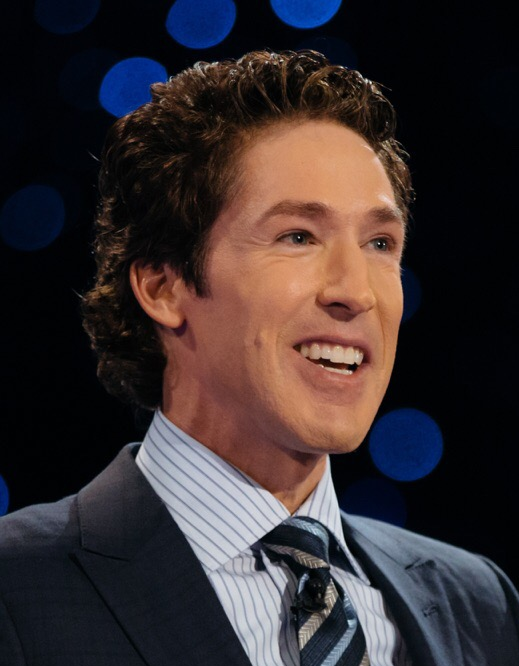
- Osteen in 2016

Personal life
- Born: Joel Scott Osteen; March 5, 1963 (age 63) Houston, Texas, U.S.
- Spouse: Victoria Iloff (m. 1987)
- Children: 2
- Parent: John Osteen (father)
- Relatives: Paul Osteen (brother)
- Website: www.joelosteen.com

Religious life
- Religion: Non-denominational Christianity (Note: includes Charismatic Christianity and especially Word of Faith)
- Church: Lakewood Church

Senior posting
- Post: Senior pastor (1999–present)

Joel Scott Osteen (/ˈoʊstiːn/ OH-steen; born March 5, 1963) is an American pastor, televangelist, businessman, and author based in Houston, Texas, United States. Known for his weekly televised services and several best-selling books, Osteen is one of the more prominent figures associated with prosperity theology and the Word of Faith movement.

== Early life ==
Osteen was born in Houston, Texas, and is one of six children of John Osteen and Dolores ("Dodie") Pilgrim. His father, a former Southern Baptist pastor, founded Lakewood Church (of which Osteen is the current senior pastor) in the back of an old feed store.

Osteen graduated from Humble High School in Humble, Texas, in 1981. He attended Oral Roberts University for one year as a radio and television communications student before dropping out. Osteen does not hold a divinity school degree.

== Career ==
In 1982, Osteen returned to Houston after leaving Oral Roberts University. He founded Lakewood's television program, later becoming ordained through his father's church in 1983. Osteen produced his father's televised sermons for 17 years until January 1999, when his father died of a heart attack. He would preach his first sermon on January 17, 1999. By October 3, he was the new senior pastor of Lakewood Church.

In 2003, Lakewood Church acquired the Compaq Center, former home of the NBA Houston Rockets and the AHL Houston Aeros, and subsequently renovated it.

=== Preaching style ===
Osteen memorizes his planned remarks before he delivers them, and listens back to previous ones on tape. His sermons have been criticized as self-serving and revealing a poor command of Scripture. Osteen says he chooses to focus more on the goodness of God and on living an obedient life rather than on sin, and that he tries to teach Biblical principles in a simple way, emphasizing the power of love and a positive attitude. When asked why he does not focus more on sin, the devil, and hell in detail, Osteen stated in an interview with CBN News:

When I grew up, the devil was a reason why I had a headache or the devil was the reason I got mad today. We always blamed the devil. I think today when I say the enemy, I like to make it broader. Sometimes the enemy can be our own thoughts. We've trained ourselves the wrong way. Or the enemy can be our own lack of discipline. Some people preach about hell like you're already going there, and to me the Gospel means "Good News." I'd rather say God is a God of mercy. So I think the people already know what they're doing wrong, and I certainly believe in hell. But to me, when I see thousands of people before me, it just doesn't come out of me to say, "You guys are terrible, and you're going to hell." I'd rather say that God is a God of mercy. You've got to live an obedient life, but for every mistake you've made, there's mercy there, and I believe we can do better.

=== Events ===
Since 2004, Osteen, along with his wife, have hosted Night of Hope events, as well as their annual stadium event called "America's Night of Hope", in the U.S. and around the world. The event incorporates contemporary Christian music and inspirational messages to reach attendees at the venue and others watching online. Osteen also hosted an event at his Lakewood Church in 2018, in collaboration with rapper Kanye West, called Sunday Service. According to media reports, the event was attended by 17,000 as well as joined by many people streaming online. He also held his Easter service during COVID-19 with Mariah Carey and Tyler Perry.

=== Shooting ===
On February 11, 2024, a woman with a history of mental health issues, Genesse Ivonne Moreno, accompanied by her 7-year-old son, entered the church between services and began firing an AR-15 rifle. Two off-duty police officers working security returned fire and killed her. Her son was critically injured with a gunshot to the head by the police officers during the exchange of gunfire. Another man who was present was wounded.

== Personal life ==
On April 4, 1987, Osteen married Victoria Osteen (née Iloff), who later became co-pastor of Lakewood Church. They have two children. In 2002, some of his siblings, including Paul, were also involved in full-time ministry.

Osteen lives with his family in a 17,000 square-foot mansion in River Oaks, with an estimated value of $10.5 million. Osteen says that as senior pastor, he draws no salary from the church, which has an annual budget of $70 million; instead, he relies on income from book sales.

== Political and social views ==
Osteen has generally avoided discussing or preaching about controversial issues such as gay marriage, abortion, and politics. Having gone on record saying homosexuality is "not God's best", he has stated he believes the church has a tendency to become overly focused on single issues (such as homosexuality) to the point of neglecting others. When asked if he thought God approves of homosexuality, Osteen said homosexuality is a sin according to his interpretation of Scripture, but said gay people are welcome in his church without judgment.

In an interview on Fox News in 2008 during the Republican Party presidential primary race, when discussing whether he thought that Mormons were Christians, Osteen indicated that he believed that they were. He further revealed that he had not studied the religion. In an interview in 2011, Osteen stated his support for Israel. In 2022, Osteen virtually interviewed Prime Minister of Israel, Benjamin Netanyahu.

Following the murder of George Floyd in 2020, Osteen joined Floyd's family in a march through downtown Houston and delivered a prayer before the march. In interviews about his decision to speak out and join the march, Osteen said, "I stay away from political issues, but this is not a political issue. Wrong is wrong and we want to lend our voice, you know this, but to stand with our Black brothers and sisters and stand against injustice and the things that have been wrong."

== Controversies ==
=== Prosperity gospel ===
Osteen's sermons and writings are sometimes criticized for promoting prosperity theology, or the prosperity gospel, a belief that the reward of material gain is the will of God for all pious Christians. Critics of the prosperity gospel consider its teachings to be contrary to the gospels of Matthew 19:16-30; Mark 10:17-31; and Luke 18:18-30.

On October 14, 2007, 60 Minutes ran a 12-minute segment on Osteen, titled "Joel Osteen Answers His Critics", during which Reformed theologian Michael Horton told CBS News correspondent Byron Pitts that Osteen's message is heresy. Horton stated that the problem with Osteen's message is that "it makes religion about us instead of about God."

Osteen is estimated to have a net worth of over $50 million, with his church taking in $43 million a year in collections. According to the Houston Chronicle, Osteen denied taking any pandemic CARES Act assistance, but U.S. Small Business Administration data revealed his church received $4.4 million from the fund. The church paid back this loan in 2021, and also retired their 19-year debt from a $100 million construction loan in December 2023.

=== Hurricane Harvey response ===
During the immediate aftermath of Hurricane Harvey in August 2017, Osteen was criticized for not making Lakewood Church, a 606,000-square-foot, 16,000-seat former sports arena, available as an emergency shelter for those displaced by the storm. On August 27, posts from the church and a Lakewood Church associate pastor's social media accounts stated that the church was "inaccessible due to severe flooding," and associate pastor John Gray posted further, "If WE could get there WE WOULD OPEN THE DOORS." Lakewood spokesperson Don Iloff later described floodwaters as one foot from spilling over the facility's floodgate and surging into the building. He also stated that pictures showing Lakewood free of flooding were taken on Monday, after the flood waters had lowered.

Osteen disputed the claim that flood waters closed the church, saying "the church has been open from the beginning," and, "[w]e've always been open ... How this notion got started, that we're not a shelter and we're not taking people in is a false narrative." This contradicted his earlier statement that the church would open when other refugee centers were full. On the evening of August 28, it was announced by Lakewood that it would open at noon the next day as an available shelter to storm victims and emergency personnel, which it did.

On August 15, 2018, less than a year after Harvey struck, the City of Houston and Mayor Sylvester Turner proclaimed a day in honor of the assistance of Lakewood and Osteen in rebuilding efforts across the Houston area.

=== Other ===
In 2011, Osteen and Lakewood Church were sued by the band The American Dollar for copyright infringement. A judge in 2012 ruled in favor of Osteen.

== Filmography ==
List of film and television appearances
Year	Title	Role	Notes
2007	Friends of God: A Road Trip with Alexandra Pelosi	Himself	Documentary
2014	Words of Art	Himself	Documentary
2015	I Hope You Dance: The Power and Spirit of Song	Himself	Documentary
2017	The Star	Caspar	Voice role

== Selected works ==
- Your Best Life Now: 7 Steps to Living at Your Full Potential (2004) ISBN 9780446510936
- Daily Readings from Your Best Life Now: 90 Devotions for Living at Your Full Potential (2005)
- Become a Better You: 7 Keys to Improving Your Life Every Day (2007) ISBN 9780743296922
- Your Best Life Begins Each Morning: Devotions to Start Every New Day of the Year (2008)
- It's Your Time : Activate Your Faith, Achieve Your Dreams, and Increase in God's Favor (2009)
- It's Your Time: Finding Favor, Restoration, and Abundance in Your Life Every Day (2009)
- Everyday a Friday: How to Be Happier 7 Days a Week (2011)
- I Declare: 31 Promises to Speak Over Your Life (2012)
- Break Out!: 5 Keys to Go Beyond Your Barriers and Live an Extraordinary Life (2013)
- You Can You Will: 8 Undeniable Qualities of a Winner (2014)
- Fresh Start: the New You Begins Today (2015)
- The Power of I Am: Two Words That Will Change Your Life Today (2015)
- Think Better, Live Better: A Victorious Life Begins in Your Mind (2016)
- Blessed in the Darkness: How All Things Are Working for Your Good (2017)
- Empty Out the Negative (2017)
- Next Level Thinking: 10 Powerful Thoughts for a Successful and Abundant Life (2018)
- The Power of Favor: The Force That Will Take You Where You Can't Go on Your Own (2019)
- The Abundance Mind-Set: Success Starts Here (2020)
- Peaceful on Purpose: The Power to Remain Calm, Strong, and Confident in Every Season (2021)
- You Are Stronger than You Think: Unleash the Power to Go Bigger, Go Bold, and Go Beyond What Limits You (2021)
- Rule Your Day: 6 Keys to Maximizing Your Success and Accelerating Your Dreams (2022)
- Your Greater is Coming: Discover the Path to Your Bigger, Better, and Brighter Future (2022)
- 15 Ways to Live Longer and Healthier: Life-Changing Strategies for Greater Energy, a More Focused Mind, and a Calmer Soul (2023)
- Psalms and Proverbs for Everyday Life: 100 Daily Devotions (2023)
- Believe: Hope Has Your Name on It (2023)
- Speak the Blessing: Send Your Words in the Direction You Want Your Life to Go (2024)

== See also ==
- Christianity in Houston
- Charismatic movement
- Prosperity theology
