= NAACP Image Award for Outstanding News/Information – Series or Special =

American television award

This article lists the winners and nominees for the NAACP Image Award for Outstanding News/Information – Series or Special. Originally entitled Outstanding News, Talk or Information, the award was later split to honor series' and specials separately. The categories were merged back together following the 2003 ceremony, before a separate category for talk series' was created in 2008 and the category was renamed to its current title.

== Winners and nominees ==
Winners are listed first and highlighted in bold.

=== 1980s ===
Year	Series / Special	Ref
1989
1989	**Oprah Winfrey: On Location in Forsythe County**	

=== 1990s ===
Year	Series / Special	Ref
1990 – 91	—N/a	
1992
1992	**The Oprah Winfrey Show**	
1993
1993	**The Oprah Winfrey Show**	
1994
1994	**The Oprah Winfrey Show**	
1995
1995	**The Oprah Winfrey Show**	
1996	See Outstanding News, Talk or Information – Series and Outstanding News, Talk or Information – Special	
1997
1997	**BET News Special: Ron Brown – A Celebration of Life**	
1997	60 Minutes	
1997	America's Black Forum	
1997	Biography	
1997	Dateline NBC	
1998 – 99	See Outstanding News, Talk or Information – Series and Outstanding News, Talk or Information – Special	

=== 2000s ===
Year	Series / Special	Ref
2000 – 02	See Outstanding News, Talk or Information – Series and Outstanding News, Talk or Information – Special	
2003
2003	**BET Tonight with Ed Gordon**	
2003	60 Minutes II	
2003	ABC News Nightline	
2003	Biography	
2003	The Rise and Fall of Jim Crow	
2004
2004	**Judge Mathis**	
2004	106 & Park Top 10 Live	
2004	American Experience	
2004	Brother Outsider: The Life of Bayard Rustin	
2004	Unchained Memories: Readings from the Slave Narratives	
2005
2005	**Tavis Smiley**	
2005	American Experience	
2005	Beah: A Black Woman Speaks	
2005	Brown vs. Board of Education Anniversary	
2005	Judge Mathis	
2006
2006	**Tavis Smiley**	
2006	CNN	
2006	Judge Mathis	
2006	The Tyra Banks Show	
2006	Unforgivable Blackness: The Rise and Fall of Jack Johnson	
2007
2007	**Tavis Smiley**	
2007	Biography	
2007	Crisis in Darfur	
2007	Real Sports with Bryant Gumbel	
2007	The Tyra Banks Show	
2008
2008	**In Conversation: The Senator Barack Obama Interview**	
2008	American Gangster	
2008	American Morning	
2008	Dr. Sonja Gupta: Saving Your Life	
2008	Good Morning America	
2009
2009	**In Conversation: Michelle Obama Interview**	
2009	American Gangster	
2009	Anderson Cooper 360°	
2009	The Oprah Winfrey Show	
2009	Real Sports with Bryant Gumbel	

=== 2010s ===
Year	Series / Special	Ref
2010
2010	**President Obama: The Inauguration**	
2010	Anderson Cooper 360°	
2010	CNN Presents	
2010	Judge Mathis	
2010	Leading Women	
2011
2011	**Unsung**	
2011	A Conversation with President Obama	
2011	Anderson Cooper 360°	
2011	Judge Mathis	
2011	Washington Watch with Roland Martin	
2012
2012	**Unsung**	
2012	BET News Exclusive: The President Answers Black America	
2012	Judge Mathis	
2012	Real Sports with Bryant Gumbel	
2012	Washington Watch with Roland Martin	
2013
2013	**Unsung**	
2013	Ask Obama Live: An MTV Interview with The President	
2013	Judge Mathis	
2013	Save My Son with Dr. Steve Perry	
2013	Washington Watch with Roland Martin	
2014
2014	**The African Americans: Many Rivers to Cross with Henry Louis Gates, Jr.**	
2014	Justice for Trayvon	
2014	Mandela: Freedom's Father	
2014	Oprah: Where Are They Now?	
2014	Unsung	
2015
2015	**Unsung**	
2015	America After Ferguson	
2015	Finding Your Roots with Henry Louis Gates, Jr.	
2015	Melissa Harris-Perry	
2015	Oprah's Lifeclass	
2016
2016	**Unsung**	
2016	Katrina: 10 Years After the Storm	
2016	News One Now	
2016	Oprah Prime: Celebrating Dr. King and the Selma Marches 50 Years Later	
2016	Oprah: Where Are They Now?	
2017
2017	**BET Love and Happiness White House Special**	
2017	AM Joy with Joy Reid	
2017	StarTalk with Neil deGrasse Tyson	
2017	Stay Woke	
2017	Unsung for Sugarhill Gang	
2018
2018	**Unsung**	
2018	News One Now	
2018	Oprah's Master Class	
2018	The Story of Us with Morgan Freeman	
2018	Through the Fire: The Legacy of Barack Obama	
2019
2019	**Oprah Winfrey Presents: Becoming Michelle Obama**	
2019	AM Joy	
2019	Angela Rye's State of the Union	
2019	A Thousand Words with Michelle Obama	
2019	Unsung	

=== 2020s ===
Year	Series / Special	Ref
2020
2020	**Unsung**	
2020	Pushout: The Criminalization of Black Girls in Schools	
2020	Surviving R. Kelly	
2020	The Breakfast Club	
2020	The Story of God with Morgan Freeman	
2021
2021	**The New York Times Presents "The Killing of Breonna Taylor"**	
2021	AM Joy: Remembering John Lewis Special	
2021	Desus & Mero: The Obama Interview	
2021	The Color of COVID	
2021	The ReidOut	

== Multiple wins and nominations ==
=== Wins ===
7 wins

- Unsung

4 wins

- The Oprah Winfrey Show

3 wins

- Tavis Smiley

2 wins

- In Conversation

=== Nominations ===
10 nominations

- Unsung

7 nominations

- Judge Mathis

5 nominations

- The Oprah Winfrey Show

3 nominations

- Anderson Cooper 360°
- Biography
- Real Sports with Bryant Gumbel
- Tavis Smiley
- Washington Watch with Roland Martin

2 nominations

- American Experience
- American Gangster
- Anderson Cooper 360°
- In Conversation
- Oprah: Where Are They Now?
- The Tyra Banks Show
