= List of awards and nominations received by Oprah Winfrey =

Oprah Winfrey awards and nominations
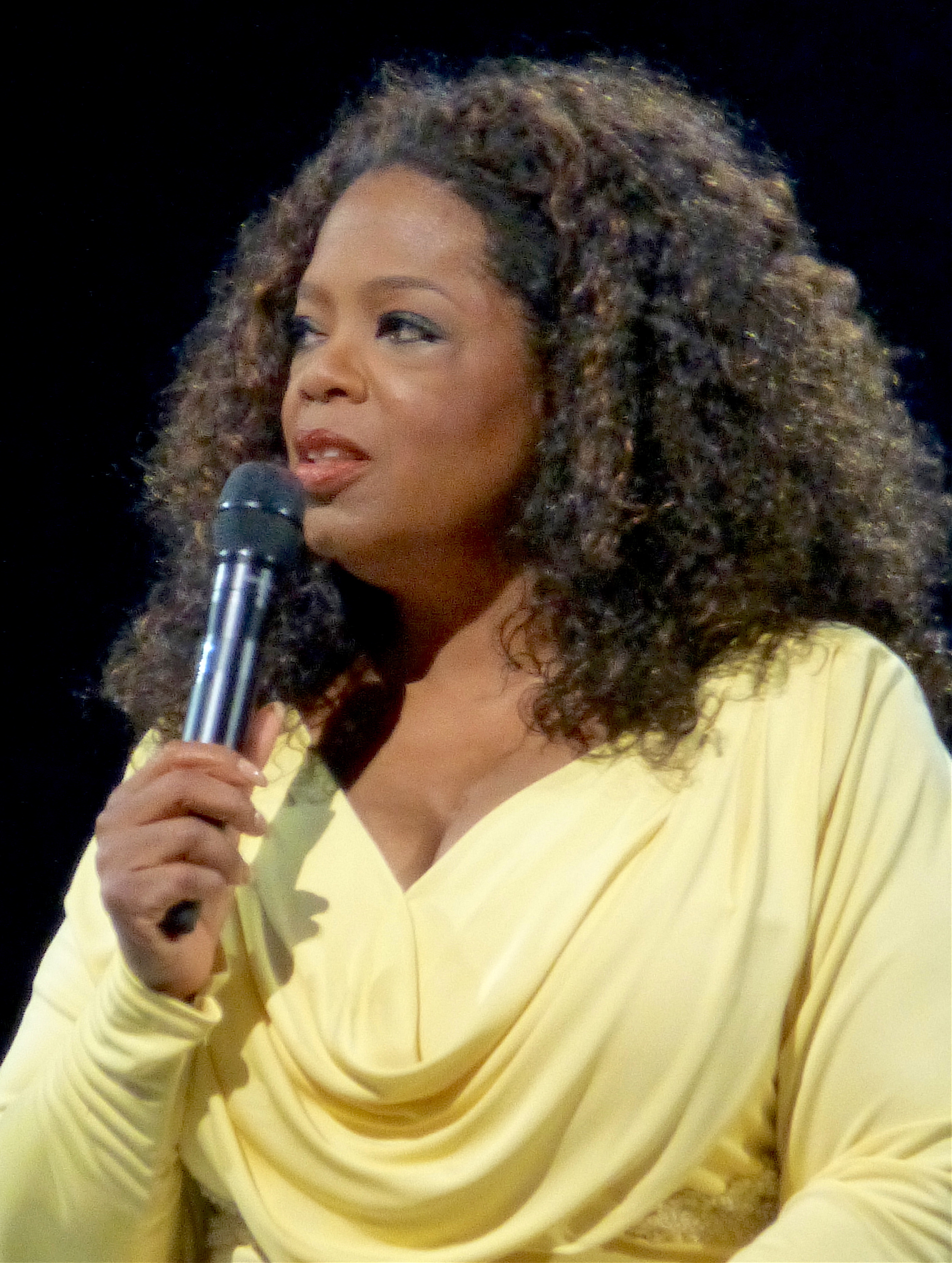
- Winfrey in 2014
Awards and nominations
| Award | Wins | Nominations |
| Academy Awards | 0 | 2 |
| Daytime Emmys | 20 | 28 |
| Golden Globes | 1 | 1 |
| NAACP Awards | 12 | 25 |
| Primetime Emmys | 1 | 10 |
| Tony Awards | 1 | 2 |

Totals (Note: Certain award groups do not simply award one winner. They acknowledge several different recipients, have runners-up, and have third place. Since this is a specific recognition and is different from losing an award, runner-up mentions are considered wins in this award tally. For simplification and to avoid errors, each award in this list has been presumed to have had a prior nomination.)
- Wins: 39
- Nominations: 68

This article is a List of awards and nominations received by Oprah Winfrey.

Oprah Winfrey is a talk show host, media mogul, producer, actor and commentator. She has received various accolades including 20 Daytime Emmy Awards, a Primetime Emmy Awards, 12 NAACP Image Awards, a Golden Globe Award, and a Tony Award.

Winfrey started her career as a talk show host where she gained immense stardom and popularity hosting the daytime talk series The Oprah Winfrey Show from 1986 to 2011. She received nine Daytime Emmy Awards for Outstanding Daytime Talk Series and seven Daytime Emmy Awards for Outstanding Daytime Talk Series Host. Additionally she won seven NAACP Image Awards and four People's Choice Awards. She also hosted the self-help talk series Super Soul Sunday from 2011 to 2021 where she won three Daytime Emmy Awards for Outstanding Special Class Series.

As an actress, she portrayed Sofia in the Steven Spielberg directed epic period film The Color Purple (1985) for which she was nominated for the Academy Award for Best Supporting Actress and the Golden Globe Award for Best Supporting Actress - Motion Picture. For her work as Gloria Gaines in The Butler (2013), she received British Academy Film Award and Screen Actors Guild Award for Best Actress in a Supporting Role nominations. She produced the Ava DuVernay directed Civil Rights historical drama Selma (2014) for which she was nominated for the Academy Award for Best Picture. On Broadway, she produced the musical The Color Purple in 2005 and its revival in 2016 earning the Tony Award for Best Revival of a Musical.

Over her career she has received several honorary awards including a Special Peabody Award in 1995, the Daytime Television Academy's Lifetime Achievement Award in 1999, the Academy of Television Arts & Sciences Bob Hope Humanitarian Award in 2002, the Golden Globe Cecil B. DeMille Award in 2018. The Academy of Motion Picture Arts and Sciences honored her with the Jean Hersholt Humanitarian Award in 2011. President Barack Obama presented her with the Presidential Medal of Freedom in 2013.

== Major associations ==
=== Academy Awards ===
| Year | Category | Nominated work | Result | Ref. |
|---|---|---|---|---|
| 1985 | Best Supporting Actress | The Color Purple | Nominated | |
| 2011 | Jean Hersholt Humanitarian Award | | Won | |
| 2014 | Best Picture | Selma | Nominated | |

=== British Academy Film Awards ===
| Year | Category | Nominated work | Result | Ref. |
|---|---|---|---|---|
| 2014 | Best Actress in a Supporting Role | The Butler | Nominated | |

=== Critics' Choice Movie Awards ===
| Year | Category | Nominated work | Result | Ref. |
|---|---|---|---|---|
| 2014 | Best Supporting Actress | The Butler | Nominated | |

=== Emmy Awards ===
| Year | Category | Nominated work | Result | Ref. |
Daytime Emmy Awards
| 1987 | Outstanding Daytime Talk Show | The Oprah Winfrey Show | Won | |
| 1987 | Outstanding Daytime Talk Show Host | The Oprah Winfrey Show | Won | |
| 1988 | Outstanding Daytime Talk Show | The Oprah Winfrey Show | Won | |
| 1989 | Outstanding Daytime Talk Show | The Oprah Winfrey Show | Won | |
| 1990 | Outstanding Daytime Talk Show | The Oprah Winfrey Show | Nominated | |
| 1991 | Outstanding Daytime Talk Show | The Oprah Winfrey Show | Won | |
| 1991 | Outstanding Daytime Talk Show Host | The Oprah Winfrey Show | Won | |
| 1992 | Outstanding Daytime Talk Show | The Oprah Winfrey Show | Won | |
| 1992 | Outstanding Daytime Talk Show Host | The Oprah Winfrey Show | Won | |
| 1993 | Outstanding Daytime Talk Show | The Oprah Winfrey Show | Nominated | |
| 1993 | Outstanding Daytime Talk Show Host | The Oprah Winfrey Show | Won | |
| 1993 | Outstanding Children's Special | ABC Afterschool Specials | Won | |
| 1994 | Outstanding Daytime Talk Show | The Oprah Winfrey Show | Won | |
| 1994 | Outstanding Daytime Talk Show Host | The Oprah Winfrey Show | Won | |
| 1995 | Outstanding Daytime Talk Show | The Oprah Winfrey Show | Won | |
| 1995 | Outstanding Daytime Talk Show Host | The Oprah Winfrey Show | Won | |
| 1996 | Outstanding Daytime Talk Show | The Oprah Winfrey Show | Won | |
| 1997 | Outstanding Daytime Talk Show | The Oprah Winfrey Show | Won | |
| 1998 | Outstanding Daytime Talk Show Host | The Oprah Winfrey Show | Nominated | |
| 1998 | Lifetime Achievement Award | | Honored | |
| 1999 | Outstanding Daytime Talk Show Host | The Oprah Winfrey Show | Nominated | |
| 2011 | Chairman's Crystal Pillar Award | | Honored | |
| 2012 | Outstanding Special Class Series | Super Soul Sunday | Won | |
| 2013 | Outstanding Special Class Series | Super Soul Sunday | Nominated | |
| 2014 | Outstanding Special Class Series | Super Soul Sunday | Won | |
| 2016 | Outstanding Special Class Series | Super Soul Sunday | Nominated | |
| 2017 | Outstanding Special Class Series | Super Soul Sunday | Won | |
| 2018 | Outstanding Special Class Series | Super Soul Sunday | Nominated | |
| 2020 | Outstanding Special Class Series | Super Soul Sunday | Nominated | |
| 2024 | Arts And Popular Culture Program | Oprah and "The Color Purple" Journey | Won | |
Primetime Emmy Award
| 1989 | Outstanding Miniseries | The Women of Brewster Place | Nominated | |
| 1994 | Outstanding Informational Special | Michael Jackson Talks... To Oprah | Nominated | |
| 2000 | Outstanding Made for Television Movie | Tuesdays with Morrie | Won | |
| 2002 | Bob Hope Humanitarian Award | | Honored | |
| 2013 | Outstanding Information Special or Series | Oprah's Master Class | Nominated | |
| 2014 | Outstanding Documentary or Nonfiction Special | Running from Crazy | Nominated | |
| 2017 | Outstanding Television Movie | The Immortal Life of Henrietta Lacks | Nominated | |
| 2019 | Outstanding Limited Series | When They See Us | Nominated | |
| 2021 | Outstanding Hosted Nonfiction Series or Special | Oprah with Meghan and Harry | Nominated | |
| 2023 | Outstanding Documentary or Nonfiction Series | The 1619 Project | Won | |
| 2023 | Outstanding Hosted Nonfiction Series or Special | The Light We Carry | Nominated | |

=== Golden Globe Award ===
| Year | Category | Nominated work | Result | Ref. |
|---|---|---|---|---|
| 1986 | Best Supporting Actress – Motion Picture | The Color Purple | Nominated | |
| 2018 | Cecil B. DeMille Award | | Won | |

=== Screen Actors Guild Awards ===
| Year | Category | Nominated work | Result | Ref. |
|---|---|---|---|---|
| 2014 | Outstanding Performance by a Female Actor in a Supporting Role | The Butler | Nominated | |

=== Tony Awards ===
| Year | Category | Nominated work | Result | Ref. |
|---|---|---|---|---|
| 2006 | Best Musical | The Color Purple | Nominated | |
| 2016 | Best Musical Revival | The Color Purple | Won | |

== Miscellaneous awards ==
| Organizations | Year | Category | Work | Result | Ref. |
|---|---|---|---|---|---|
| Acapulco Black Film Festival | 1999 | Black Film Award for Best Actress | Beloved | Won | |
| NAACP Image Award | 1989 | Outstanding News, Talk or Information – Series or Special | Oprah Winfrey: On Location in Forsyth County | Won | |
| NAACP Image Award | 1991 | Entertainer of the Year | | Won | |
| NAACP Image Award | 1992 | Outstanding News, Talk or Information – Series or Special | The Oprah Winfrey Show | Won | |
| NAACP Image Award | 1992 | Outstanding News, Talk or Information – Series | The Oprah Winfrey Show | Won | |
| NAACP Image Award | 1993 | Outstanding News, Talk or Information – Series or Special | The Oprah Winfrey Show | Won | |
| NAACP Image Award | 1994 | Outstanding News, Talk or Information – Series or Special | The Oprah Winfrey Show | Won | |
| NAACP Image Award | 1995 | Outstanding News, Talk or Information – Series or Special | The Oprah Winfrey Show | Won | |
| NAACP Image Award | 1996 | Outstanding News, Talk or Information – Series | The Oprah Winfrey Show | Won | |
| NAACP Image Award | 1998 | Outstanding News, Talk or Information – Series | The Oprah Winfrey Show | Won | |
| NAACP Image Award | 1998 | Outstanding News, Talk or Information – Special | Dinner With Oprah: A Lifetime Exclusive – Toni Morrison | Won | |
| NAACP Image Award | 1999 | Outstanding Lead Actress in a Motion Picture | Beloved | Nominated | |
| NAACP Image Award | 2005 | Hall of Fame | | Honored | |
| NAACP Image Award | 2012 | Outstanding Talk Series | Oprah's Lifeclass | Won | |
| NAACP Image Award | 2013 | Outstanding Talk Series | Oprah's Lifeclass | Nominated | |
| NAACP Image Award | 2014 | Outstanding News/ Information (Series or Special) | Oprah: Where Are They Now? | Nominated | |
| NAACP Image Award | 2014 | Outstanding Talk Series | Oprah's Lifeclass | Nominated | |
| NAACP Image Award | 2014 | Outstanding Talk Series | Oprah's Next Chapter | Nominated | |
| NAACP Image Award | 2015 | Outstanding News/ Information (Series or Special) | Oprah's Lifeclass | Nominated | |
| NAACP Image Award | 2015 | Outstanding Talk Series | Oprah Prime | Nominated | |
| NAACP Image Award | 2015 | Outstanding Variety (Series or Special) | Oprah's Master Class | Nominated | |
| NAACP Image Award | 2015 | Outstanding Supporting Actress in a Motion Picture | Selma | Nominated | |
| NAACP Image Award | 2016 | Outstanding News/ Information (Series or Special) | Oprah Prime: Celebrating Dr. King and the Selma Marches 50 Years Later | Nominated | |
| NAACP Image Award | 2016 | Outstanding News/ Information (Series or Special) | Oprah: Where Are They Now? | Nominated | |
| NAACP Image Award | 2017 | Outstanding Talk Series | Super Soul Sunday | Nominated | |
| People's Choice Awards | 1988 | Favorite Talk Show Host | The Oprah Winfrey Show | Won | |
| People's Choice Awards | 1997 | Favorite Female Television Performer | The Oprah Winfrey Show | Won | |
| People's Choice Awards | 1998 | Favorite Female Television Performer | The Oprah Winfrey Show | Won | |
| People's Choice Awards | 2004 | Favorite Talk Show Host | The Oprah Winfrey Show | Won | |
| People's Choice Awards | 2005 | Favorite Daytime Talk Show Host | The Oprah Winfrey Show | Nominated | |
| People's Choice Awards | 2006 | Favorite Daytime Talk Show Host | The Oprah Winfrey Show | Nominated | |
| People's Choice Awards | 2007 | Favorite Talk Show Host | The Oprah Winfrey Show | Nominated | |
| People's Choice Awards | 2008 | Favorite Talk Show Host | The Oprah Winfrey Show | Nominated | |
| Producers Guild of America | 1999 | Producer of the Year | Tuesdays with Morrie | Nominated | |
| Woman of the Year | 2019 | In 2019, Time created 89 new covers to celebrate women of the year starting from 1920; it chose Oprah for 2004. | | Won | |

== Honorary awards ==
| Organizations | Year | Award | Result | Ref. |
|---|---|---|---|---|
| Peabody Awards | 1995 | Personal Award | Honored | |
| National Academy of Television Arts and Sciences | 1999 | Lifetime Achievement Award | Honored | |
| Jefferson Awards for Public Service | 1998 | S. Roger Horchow Award (Note: for Greatest Public Service by a Private Citizen) | Honored | |
| Academy of Television Arts & Sciences | 2002 | Bob Hope Humanitarian Award | Honored | |
| Academy of Motion Picture Arts and Sciences | 2011 | Jean Hersholt Humanitarian Award | Honored | |
| Daytime Emmy Awards | 2011 | Chairman's Crystal Pillar Award | Honored | |
| President of the United States | 2013 | Presidential Medal of Freedom | Honored | |
| Hollywood Foreign Press Association | 2018 | Golden Globe Cecil B. DeMille Award | Honored | |

== See also ==
- List of people who have won Academy, Emmy, Grammy, and Tony Awards#Three awards (non-competitive)
