= NAACP Image Award for Outstanding Talk Series =

American television award

- Awarded for: Outstanding Talk Series
- Country: United States
- Presented by: NAACP
- First award: 2008
- Currently held by: The Jennifer Hudson Show (2026)
- Website: naacpimageawards.net

This article lists the winners and nominees for the NAACP Image Award for Outstanding Talk Series. The award was created during the 2008 ceremony after being separated from the Outstanding News/Information – Series or Special category. Currently Red Table Talk, Steve Harvey and The View hold the record for most wins in this category with three each.

== Winners and nominees ==
Winners are listed first and highlighted in bold.

=== 2000s ===
Year	Series	Ref
2008
2008	**Tavis Smiley**	
2008	Judge Mathis	
2008	Our World with Black Enterprise	
2008	Real Time with Bill Maher	
2008	The Tyra Banks Show	
2009
2009	**The View**	
2009	Iconoclasts	
2009	Judge Mathis	
2009	Tavis Smiley	
2009	The Tyra Banks Show	

=== 2010s ===
Year	Series	Ref
2010
2010	**The Mo'Nique Show**	
2010	Lopez Tonight	
2010	The Tyra Banks Show	
2010	The View	
2010	The Wanda Sykes Show	
2011
2011	**The View**	
2011	Larry King Live	
2011	The Mo'Nique Show	
2011	TV One on One	
2012
2012	**Oprah's Lifeclass**	
2012	Anderson	
2012	The Doctors	
2012	The View	
2012	The Wendy Williams Show	
2013
2013	**The View**	
2013	Don't Sleep!	
2013	Oprah's Lifeclass	
2013	Oprah's Next Chapter	
2013	Totally Biased with W. Kamau Bell	
2014
2014	**Steve Harvey**	
2014	The Arsenio Hall Show	
2014	Oprah's Lifeclass	
2014	Oprah's Next Chapter	
2014	The Queen Latifah Show	
2015
2015	**Steve Harvey**	
2015	Oprah Prime	
2015	The Queen Latifah Show	
2015	The View	
2015	The Wendy Williams Show	
2016
2016	**The Talk**	
2016	The Daily Show with Trevor Noah	
2016	Melissa Harris-Perry	
2016	Steve Harvey	
2016	The Wendy Williams Show	
2017
2017	**Steve Harvey**	
2017	Super Soul Sunday	
2017	The Real	
2017	The Talk	
2017	The View	
2018
2018	**The Real**	
2018	Jimmy Kimmel Live	
2018	Super Soul Sunday	
2018	The Daily Show with Trevor Noah	
2018	The View	
2019
2019	**The Real**	
2019	ESPN's First Take	
2019	Red Table Talk	
2019	The Daily Show with Trevor Noah	
2019	The View	

=== 2020s ===
Year	Series	Ref
2020
2020	**Red Table Talk**	
2020	The Daily Show with Trevor Noah	
2020	The Real	
2020	The Shop: Uninterrupted	
2020	Tamron Hall	
2021
2021	**Red Table Talk**	
2021	The Daily Show with Trevor Noah	
2021	The Oprah Conversation	
2021	The Shop: Uninterrupted	
2021	Tamron Hall	
2022
2022	**Red Table Talk**	
2022	Desus & Mero	
2022	Hart to Heart	
2022	The Real	
2022	Tamron Hall	

== Multiple wins and nominations ==
=== Wins ===
3 wins

- Red Table Talk
- Steve Harvey
- The View

2 wins

- The Real

=== Nominations ===
9 nominations

- The View

5 nominations

- The Daily Show with Trevor Noah
- The Real

4 nominations

- Red Table Talk
- Steve Harvey

3 nominations

- Oprah's Lifeclass
- Tamron Hall
- The Tyra Banks Show
- The Wendy Williams Show

2 nominations

- Judge Mathis
- Tavis Smiley
- Oprah's Next Chapter
- The Mo'Nique Show
- The Oprah Winfrey Show
- The Queen Latifah Show
- The Shop: Uninterrupted
- The Talk
