= Creative Arts Emmy Awards =

Class of Emmy Awards

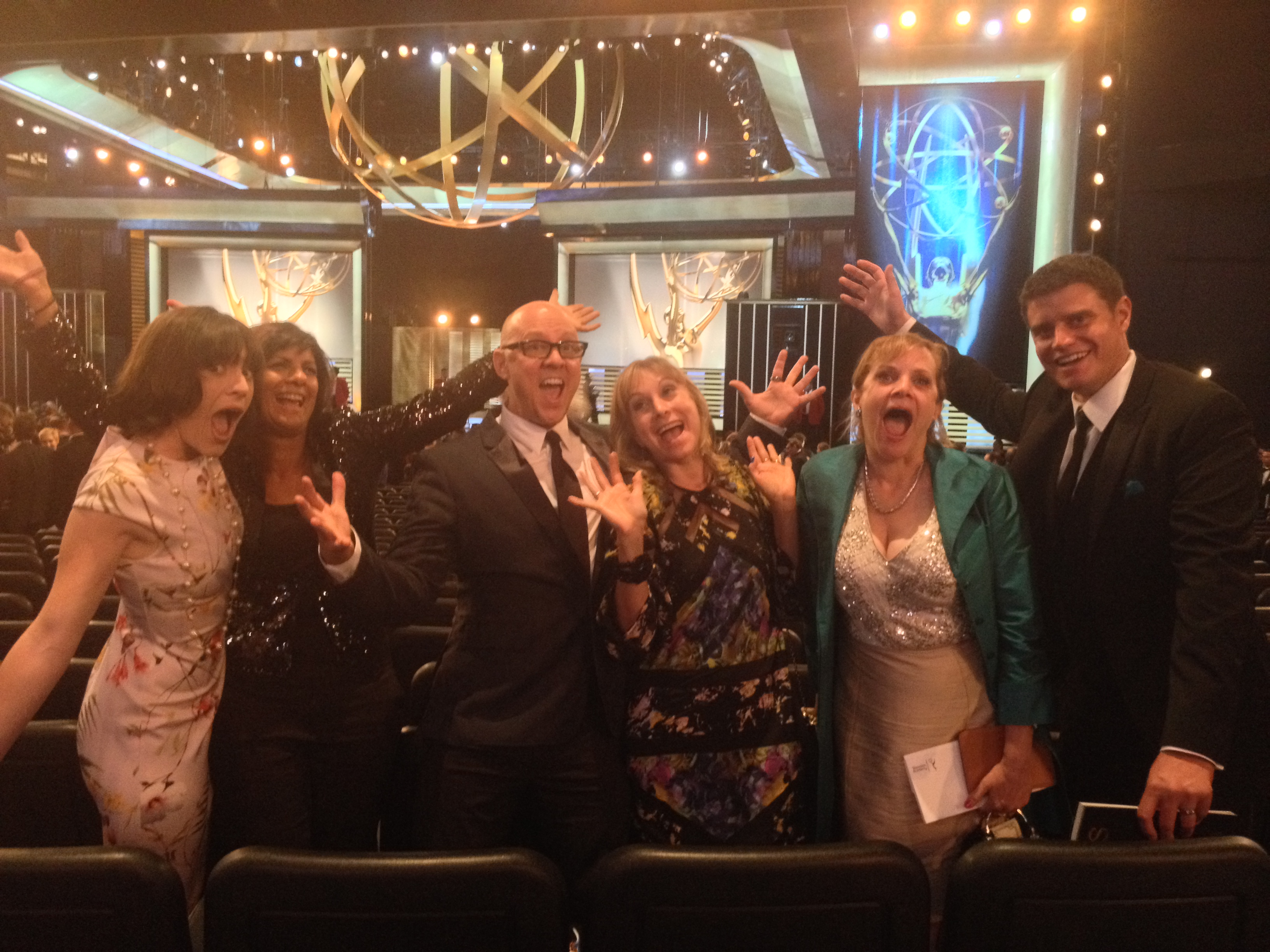
Emmy-nominated Project Runway editing team poses at the Creative Arts Emmy Awards in 2014

The Creative Arts Emmys are a class of Emmy Awards presented in recognition of technical and other similar achievements in American television programming. They are commonly awarded to behind-the-scenes personnel such as production designers, set decorators, video editors, costume designers, cinematographers, casting directors, and sound editors.

The Creative Arts category includes additional awards for outstanding animated programs, commercials, and guest actors.

The first Creative Arts Emmys were held in 1970 alongside the 22nd Primetime Emmy Awards due to the growing number of categories at the time. The Primetime Creative Arts and Daytime Creative Arts awards are presented at separate Creative Arts ceremonies on the weekend before their respective main Primetime and Daytime ceremonies. The Emmy awards for Sports are presented in a single ceremony, giving both the main and the creative arts awards.

== See also ==
- List of American television awards
