= Dustin Diamond =

American actor and comedian (1977–2021)

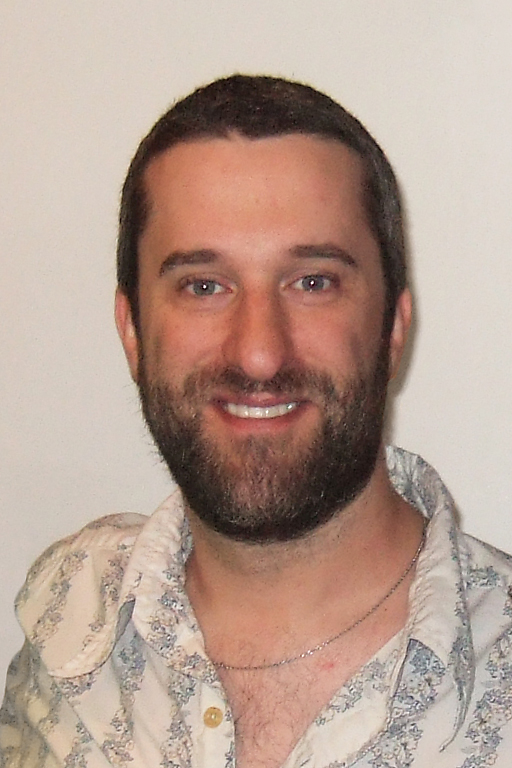
- Diamond in 2012
- Born: Dustin Neil Diamond; January 7, 1977; San Jose, California, U.S.
- Died: February 1, 2021 (aged 44); Cape Coral, Florida, U.S.
- Occupations: Actor; director; comedian
- Years active: 1987–2021
- Spouse: Jennifer Misner (m. 2009; sep. 2013)

Dustin Neil Diamond (January 7, 1977 – February 1, 2021) was an American actor and stand-up comedian. He is best known for portraying Samuel "Screech" Powers throughout the Saved by the Bell franchise, appearing from the first episodes of Good Morning, Miss Bliss (1988–89) through the subsequent spinoffs with The College Years (1993–94) and the last six seasons of The New Class (1994–2000); alongside Dennis Haskins, Diamond was the only person to appear in each of the first three Saved by the Bell shows. Following his run on Saved by the Bell, Diamond toured in stand-up comedy alongside appearances in film and reality television, most notably with the fifth season of Celebrity Fit Club in 2007.

Diamond was diagnosed with small-cell carcinoma in January 2021 and died of the disease just two weeks later.

== Early life ==
Diamond was born in San Jose, California, the son of Jaimee and Mark Diamond. His father taught digital electronics for a computer processing firm, and his mother was a computer operator for Pacific Bell. Diamond was Jewish, and attended Zion Lutheran School.

== Career ==
Diamond began acting as a child. He became known for playing Samuel "Screech" Powers on the television show Saved by the Bell, a role he played for close to thirteen years from its beginning as Good Morning, Miss Bliss (1988–89) through its final incarnation, Saved by the Bell: The New Class (1994–2000). Continuing the series into college, Saved by the Bell: The College Years shows most of the cast transplanted into not only the same college, but also the same college dormitory, where Screech continued his typical misadventures. The College Years was canceled after one season. Diamond returned to Bayside High as Principal Belding's assistant in The New Class episodes, remaining with the show until its cancellation.

=== Appearances after Saved by the Bell ===
Diamond began doing stand-up comedy after the end of Saved by the Bell and toured on and off after that. He was also featured on a number of game and reality shows including Weakest Link and Celebrity Boxing 2. Diamond also made several cameo appearances in films, including appearances in Made (2001) and Dickie Roberts: Former Child Star (2003).

In 2007, Diamond was a cast member of the fifth season of Celebrity Fit Club. During his run on the show, he came into conflict with former American Idol finalist Kimberley Locke, country singer Cledus T. Judd, rapper Da Brat, the program's host Ant, and the program's trainer, former USMC sergeant Harvey Walden IV. During one episode, Diamond mentioned what may have happened if he were to challenge Ant to "physical combat" and after Harvey Walden defended Ant, Diamond subsequently said the same to him, causing Walden to lose his temper.

Following Celebrity Fit Club, Diamond played roles as "Alumnus Guy #1" in American Pie Presents: The Book of Love (2009), in a supporting role in the sports comedy Tetherball: The Movie (2010), and as Bernardo, the castle guard, in the partially animated science-fiction comedy Hamlet A.D.D. (2014).

=== Sex tape ===
In 2006, Diamond directed and released his own celebrity sex tape, Screeched – Saved by the Smell. According to Melanie McFarland's retelling of a press release, Diamond said the tape got out because he and a group of friends had a "monthly gathering" wherein they exchanged such tapes. Several years later, Diamond said in a Where Are They Now? interview on the Oprah Winfrey Network that he was not in the sex tape; rather, a stunt double had his likeness superimposed.

=== Behind the Bell ===
In 2009, Diamond published a memoir in which he recounted behind-the-scenes anecdotes of the production of Saved by the Bell from his point of view, titled Behind the Bell. The book paints an unflattering portrait of many of Diamond's colleagues and backstage behavior. Some of these claims were repudiated by Diamond's colleagues and questioned by critics. Diamond later commented on the book's content in a December 2013 appearance on an Oprah: Where Are They Now? segment on the OWN Network, in which he stated that the book was ghostwritten by an author who simply interviewed him and compiled the book from his answers. He claimed that many parts of the book, such as allegations of teen sex and drug use, were fabricated from very minor statements he made during the interviews.

=== Other work ===
Diamond was also a musician and formed an alternative metal band called Salty The Pocketknife. Diamond played bass and wrote much of the music as well. Shortly after recording their first album, the band split up due to internal disagreements. Diamond also appeared on truTV's The Smoking Gun Presents: World's Dumbest... as a commentator.

He appeared as a host at the 12th annual Gathering of the Juggalos.

In August 2013, Diamond became a housemate on the twelfth series of Celebrity Big Brother in the UK. He became the fourth housemate to be evicted on Day 16.

Diamond was a spokesperson for the Rockford, Illinois-based insurance company Insurance King. In some of its commercials that he is featured in, he makes several references to Saved by the Bell (with logos in the commercial saying "Saved By the King"). In other commercials, he is shown to be pulled over, not caring about the already numerous tickets he has because he is "saved by the King!", being in a Western-style standoff, and being a terrible barber.

== Professional wrestling career ==
Diamond was a fan of professional wrestling. He appeared at Memphis Championship Wrestling in April 2000. He was a part of a skit with The Kat where he was beaten up by Chip Diver, the Fabulous Rocker and Dannie B.

On September 18, 2002, he appeared on an NWA-TNA's Asylum weekly pay-per-view. Billed as Screech, he challenged TNA's bellkeeper, Tiny the Bellkeeper, to a boxing match. Screech won by knockout in 42 seconds.

In 2008, Diamond was a contestant on Hulk Hogan's Celebrity Championship Wrestling, broadcast on CMT.

Diamond was a special guest referee for a match at Celebrity Big Bang Wrestling, Mistress Devon James vs Susan Finkelstein on July 22, 2010.

On February 11, 2011, Diamond teamed with Jordan McEntyre and Knight Wagner, losing to MsChif, Marion Fontaine and Krotch in an intergender match at AAW in Merrionette Park, Illinois. On March 17, 2011, he teamed with Bushwhacker Luke, Izzy Slapawitz and Doink the Clown to beat Virgil, Ashley Sixx, Celine Jean and Sheena at TWE Rethinking Rumble in Vaughan, Ontario. He lost his final match in a tag during the main event of FTW Summer of Synn, in Ronkonkoma, New York, on July 7, 2012.

== Personal life ==
In 2001, Diamond filed for bankruptcy in California. He moved to Port Washington, Wisconsin, in 2003. On June 13, 2006, he asked listeners of The Howard Stern Show to visit his website and purchase a T-shirt, reading "I paid $15.00 to save Screeech's house" (spelling "Screech" with an extra 'e' for copyright reasons). He said he hoped to sell 30,000 shirts in order to raise $250,000 and avoid foreclosure on his house. Diamond moved to Florida in 2018, and put his house in Port Washington up for sale the following year.

He reportedly married longtime girlfriend Jennifer Misner in 2009, separated in 2013 and later divorced, although his death certificate lists him as having never married. They did not have any children.

On December 26, 2014, Diamond was arrested in Ozaukee County, Wisconsin, for possession of a switchblade knife, which he was alleged to have pulled during a bar altercation in which a man was stabbed. Amanda Schutz, his fiancée, was found guilty of disorderly conduct and fined $500. On May 29, 2015, he was convicted of two misdemeanors: carrying a concealed weapon and disorderly conduct. He was cleared of the most serious charge, recklessly endangering public safety. On June 25, he was sentenced to four months in jail. He served three months and was released on probation. His probation agent later determined that he had violated his terms and he was arrested again in May 2016.

== Illness and death ==
In early January 2021, Diamond was diagnosed with extensive stage four small-cell carcinoma of the lungs. Despite completing one round of chemotherapy in Cape Coral, Florida, he died from the disease on February 1, 2021, at age 44.

=== NASCAR tribute ===
After Diamond's death, Dan Block, the founder of Insurance King and close friend of Diamond, partnered with Josh Bilicki, driver of the #52 Rick Ware Racing Ford, to run a tribute car for Diamond in the 2021 Verizon 200 at the Brickyard.

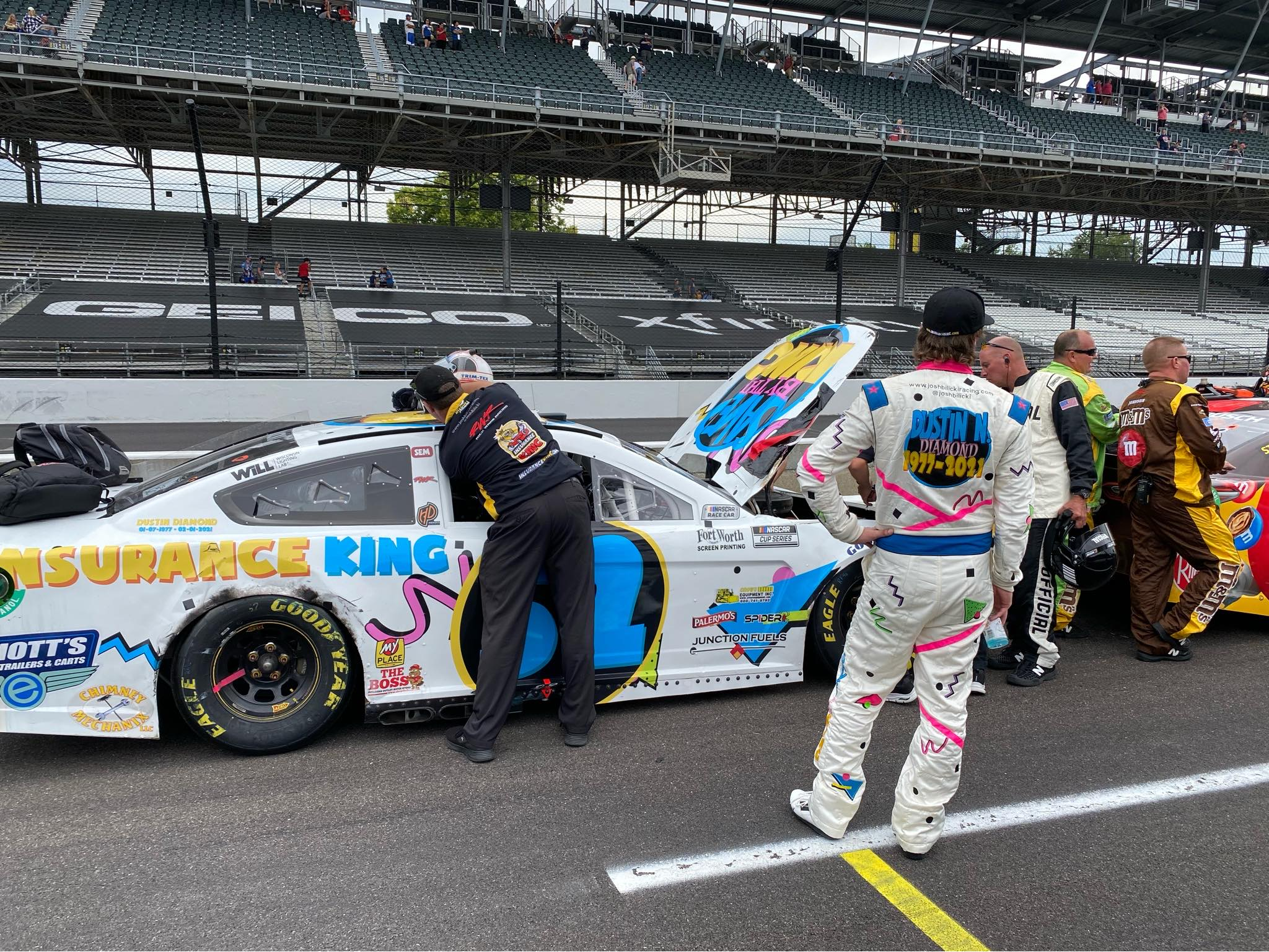
Bilicki's tribute car to Diamond. On the firesuit, it reads "Dustin N. Diamond 1977-2021".

== Filmography ==
=== Film ===
Year	Title	Role	Notes	Ref(s)
1987	The Price of Life	Young Stiles		
1988	Purple People Eater	Big Z		
1989	She's Out of Control	Beach boy		
2000	Longshot	Waiter		
2001	Made	Himself		
2002	Jane White Is Sick & Twisted	Simone		
2002	Big Fat Liar	Himself		
2003	Pauly Shore Is Dead	Himself		
2003	Dickie Roberts: Former Child Star	Himself		
2004	13th Grade	Corey		
2006	Screeched: Saved by the Smell	Himself	Also director	
2008	Our Feature Presentation	Mr. Renolds		
2009	Porndogs: The Adventures of Sadie	Buster	Voice	
2009	American Pie Presents: The Book of Love	Alumnus Guy #1		
2010	Big Money Rustlas	Man in Outhouse		
2011	Tetherball: The Movie	Coach McAger		
2013	A Dog for Christmas	Fred		
2013	Captured Hearts	Oliver Jaffe		
2013	Scavenger Killers	Agent Dewayne		
2013	College Fright Night	Professor Donnely		
2014	Hamlet A.D.D.	Bernardo		
2016	Joker's Wild	Raynard		

=== Television ===
Year	Title	Role	Notes	Ref(s)
1987	American Playhouse	Young Stiles	1 episode	
1987	It's a Living	Young Sonny	1 episode	
1987	Yogi's Great Escape	Chubby Kid	Voice; 1 episode	
1988–1989	Good Morning, Miss Bliss	Samuel "Screech" Powers	Main role	
1989–1990	The Wonder Years	Joey Harris / Joey Lapman	2 episodes	
1989–1993	Saved by the Bell	Samuel "Screech" Powers	Main role	
1990	The Munsters Today	Rob	1 episode	
1992	Saved by the Bell: Hawaiian Style	Samuel "Screech" Powers	Television film	
1993	Getting By	Tommy	2 episodes	
1993–1994	Saved by the Bell: The College Years	Samuel "Screech" Powers	Main role	
1994	Saved by the Bell: Wedding in Las Vegas	Samuel "Screech" Powers	Television film	
1994–2000	Saved by the Bell: The New Class	Samuel "Screech" Powers	Main role (seasons 2–7)	
2002	The Rerun Show	Doctor	1 episode	
2002	Star Dates	Himself	1 episode	
2004	Tom Goes to the Mayor	Himself	1 episode	
2005	Duck Dodgers	Xainius the Eternal	1 episode	
2007	Celebrity Fit Club	Himself	Main role (seasons 5–6)	
2013	Celebrity Big Brother	Himself	Housemate (series 12)	
2013	Celebrity Big Brother's Bit on the Side	Himself	Housemate	
2017	Your Pretty Face Is Going to Hell	Himself	1 episode	

=== Music videos ===
Year	Title	Role	Artist	Ref(s)
1999	"I Do (Cherish You)"	Groom	98 Degrees	
2017	"Kill All the Things"	Harvey Weinstein	TENLo	

== Awards and nominations ==
Year	Award	Category	Nominated work	Result
1990	Young Artist Awards	Outstanding Young Ensemble Cast (shared with the cast)	Saved by the Bell	Nominated
1990	Young Artist Awards	Best Young Actor in an Off-Primetime Family Series	Saved by the Bell	Nominated
1991	Young Artist Awards	Outstanding Young Comedian in a Television Series	Saved by the Bell	Nominated
1991	Young Artist Awards	Outstanding Young Ensemble Cast in a Television Series (shared with the cast)	Saved by the Bell	Won
1992	Young Artist Awards	Outstanding Young Ensemble Cast in a Television Series (shared with the cast)	Saved by the Bell	Nominated
1993	Young Artist Awards	Best Ensemble Performance in a TV Movie or Special (shared with the cast)	Saved by the Bell: Hawaiian Style	Won
1993	Young Artist Awards	Ensemble Award (shared with the cast)	Saved by the Bell	Won
1993	TV Guide Awards	Editor's Choice (shared with the cast)	Saved by the Bell	Won
1994	TV Guide Awards	Favorite Ensemble (shared with the cast)	Saved by the Bell: The College Years	Won
1994	Young Artist Awards	Outstanding Youth Ensemble in a Cable or Off Primetime Series (shared with the cast)	Saved by the Bell: The College Years	Nominated
1995	YoungStar Awards	Best Young Ensemble Cast – Television (shared with the cast)	Saved by the Bell: The College Years	Won
2002	MTV Movie & TV Awards	Best Cameo	Made	Nominated
2004	TV Land Awards	Impact Award (shared with the cast)	Saved by the Bell	Won
