= Harvey Walden IV =

Television personality

- Military career
- Branch: United States Marine Corps
- Service years: Active Duty 1984–2007
- Rank: First Sergeant
- Units: 4th Tank Battalion; Marine Corps Recruit Depot Parris Island
- Conflicts: Operation Desert Storm
- Other work: Actor

Harvey Walden IV is a former Marine drill instructor, author, actor and television host.

== Post-active duty ==
Walden is best known in the UK and US for his role as the expert fitness instructor on VH1's and ITV's primetime shows Fat Club and Celebrity Fit Club.

In the 2007 season of Fit Club, during a heated exchange, contestant Dustin Diamond (the actor commonly known as Screech from Saved by the Bell) challenged Walden to "physical combat". Walden responded to the challenge after Dustin refused to follow their diet and exercise plans.

He is a father of two children; one boy, Harvey V, and one girl, Tiyauna Denise.
