= Wendy Kaufman =

American television personality

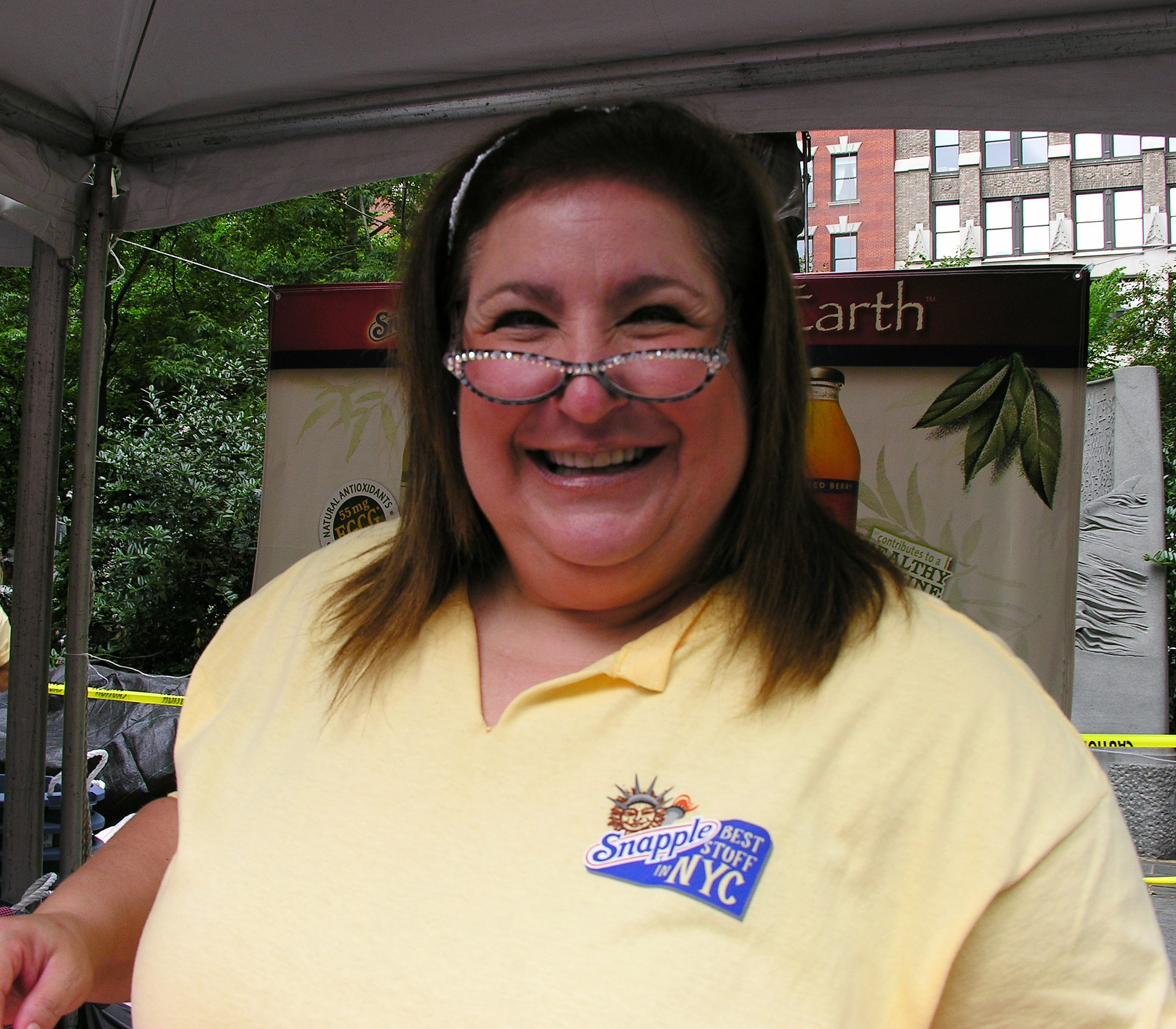
- Born: North Woodmere, New York
- Occupations: Spokesperson, TV personality

Wendy Kaufman is an American television personality, known for being the spokesperson for Snapple and for her two stints on Celebrity Fit Club.

== Early life and education ==
Kaufman was born in North Woodmere, New York, to a homemaking mother and a father who owned a steel manufacturing company. She grew up in North Woodmere and attended Lawrence High School, graduating from Syracuse University in 1980 with degrees in film and sociology.

== Snapple ==
At the time of the first ad campaign, Kaufman worked at Snapple's headquarters on Long Island. In her free time, she took it upon herself to reply to Snapple fan mail. Snapple's new ad agency, Kirshenbaum and Bond, chose Kaufman to appear as "Wendy, the Snapple Lady" and sold their choice to the founders by showing them photos of Oprah and Roseanne Barr. The ads featured Kaufman responding to letters received from Snapple customers. The Snapple Lady ads contributed to soaring sales. Kaufman appeared in dozens of ads, made guest appearances at fairs and schools, on television shows, and at celebrity benefits.

After Quaker Oats Company bought Snapple in 1994, it discontinued Kaufman's appearances in ads and sales of Snapple dropped dramatically. Snapple was acquired from Quaker Oats in a fire sale and the new owners, Triarc Companies, immediately made Kaufman the spokesperson of Snapple again. Kaufman left Snapple in 2008.

== After Snapple ==
In 2005, Kaufman appeared in seasons 1 and 2 of Celebrity Fit Club. In 2016, Kaufman was featured on an episode of Oprah: Where Are They Now?

== Personal life ==
Kaufman married Steven Harkins in 2004. The couple lives in Las Vegas. She was a drug addict for 10 years and spent 10 months in rehab shortly before joining Snapple in 1991.
