= Celebrity Fit Club (American TV series) =

American reality television series

- Directed by: Hans van Riet
- Starring: Anthony Kalloniatis (host) (seasons 1–6); Dr. Ian K. Smith (nutritionist); Rhonda Britten (life coach); Harvey Walden IV (trainer)
- No. of seasons: 7
- No. of episodes: 56

Production
- Producer: ITV Studios
- Running time: 60 minutes 90 minutes (finale)

Original release
- Network: VH1
- Release: 9 January 2005 – 5 April 2010

Celebrity Fit Club is a reality television series which followed eight overweight celebrities as they tried to lose weight. This show is based on the homonymous British version, which aired on the ITV Network from 2002 until 2006. The American version was executive produced by Richard Hall for Granada, in seasons 2–5.

== Synopsis ==
The eight participants are split into two teams of four members apiece. During each week, the teams are given different physical challenges and their members are weighed to see if they have reached their target weights. Contestants are monitored and supervised by a team comprising a nutritionist, a psychologist, and a physical trainer. The series was hosted by Ant until Season 7.

At one point during each of the first five seasons, a team trade-off was initiated, in which the fit clubbers voted one member off their team. The teammate with the most votes was then traded to the other team. In the case of a tie, the team captain made the final vote. After Season 1, a new rule was enforced prohibiting participants from voting for themselves. In Season 5, to balance the gender-based teams, a new twist was added, which allowed traded fit clubbers to choose a teammate from their old team to join their new team. In Season 6, Harvey did the trade-off himself; Season 7 did not have one.

== Panel members ==
- Ant, Host (Seasons 1–6)
- Harvey Walden IV, drill instructor (All seasons)
- Dr. David Katz, health expert (Season 1)
- Dr. Marisa Peer, psychologist (Season 1)
- Dr. Ian K. Smith, physician (Seasons 2–7)
- Dr. Linda Papadopoulos, psychologist (Seasons 2–4)
- Stacy Kaiser, psychotherapist (Seasons 5–6)
- Rhonda Britten, life coach (Season 7)

== Seasons ==
=== Season 1 (2005) ===
Premiered 9 January 2005, and ran for eight episodes.

Three Fat Bastards and One Black Beyotch (formally Ralphies Angels)
Members	Weight Loss	Percent	Notes
Ralphie May, comedian	27 lb (12 kg)	(5.6%)	Team Captain
Joseph R. Gannascoli, actor	32 lb (15 kg)	(10.6%)	Traded from Eastsiders
Kim Coles, actress/comedian	24 lb (11 kg)	(10.9%)	
Wendy Kaufman, the Snapple lady	28 lb (13 kg)	(11.4%)	
Eastsiders
Members	Weight Loss	Percent	Notes
Daniel Baldwin, actor	28 lb (13 kg)	(10.6%)	Team Captain; late for weigh-in 6; failed to appear at final weigh-in
Mia Tyler, model	17 lb (7.7 kg)	(8.1%)	
Biz Markie, rapper/DJ	40 lb (18 kg)	(11.6%)	Set record for total weight loss, winner
Mablean Ephriam, Divorce Court judge	25 lb (11 kg)	(12.0%)	Traded from Ralphie's Angels, where she was team captain

Up until the end of the show Daniel was a model team leader; however, in episode 6, he turned up very late and confused, and by episode 8 (the finale), he did not appear at all, which cost his team victory. He later revealed that he had been abusing narcotics due to his back trouble and had entered rehab. No team captain was appointed to replace him.

=== Season 2 (2005) ===
Premiered 10 July 2005 for eight episodes

Sizzlin' Soul and White Ice (winners)
Members	Weight Loss	Percent	Notes
Jackée Harry, actress/comedian	39 lb (18 kg)	(19.3%)	Team Captain
Jani Lane, singer/frontman of Warrant	23 lb (10 kg)	(12.1%)	
Phil Margera, father of Bam Margera (Jackass, Viva La Bam)	41 lb (19 kg)	(11.6%)	broke Biz Markie's record for total weight loss, winner
Gary Busey, actor	39 lb (18 kg)	(18.7%)	Traded from Crunchamatics where he was the team captain
The Winners
Members	Weight Loss	Percent	Notes
Toccara Jones, model/TV host	32 lb (15 kg)	(15.6%)	Team Captain, traded from Sizzlin' Soul and White Ice
Willie Aames, actor	19 lb (8.6 kg)	(10.2%)	
Victoria Jackson, comedian	22 lb (10.0 kg)	(13.2%)	
Wendy Kaufman, the Snapple lady, Season 1 contestant	27 lb (12 kg)	(11.9%)	only returning contestant from Season 1

=== Season 3 (2006) ===
Premiered 1 January 2006 for eight episodes.

Kelly's Bellies (winners)
Members	Weight Loss	Percent	Notes
Kelly LeBrock, actress/model	31 lb (14 kg)	(17.7%)	Team Captain
Countess Vaughn, actress/comedian	gained 4 lb (1.8 kg)	−3.0%	traded from Ebony Flame/became the first fit clubber to gain weight on the show
Bizarre, rapper/member of D12	31 lb (14 kg)	(9.7%)	
Gunnar Nelson, musician/member of Nelson	23 lb (10 kg)	(13.1%)	replaced Jeff Conaway, participated for last 60 days
Jeff Conaway, actor	0 lb (0 kg)	0.0%	original team captain, entered rehab in ep. 3
Ebony Flame
Members	Weight Loss	Percent	Notes
Chaz Bono, gay rights activist & son of Sonny & Cher	23 lb (10 kg)	(10.7%)	team captain
Tempestt Bledsoe, actress	19 lb (8.6 kg)	(10.5%)	traded from Kelly's Bellies
Young MC, rapper	38 lb (17 kg)	(13.7%)	winner
Bruce Vilanch, writer/comedian	21 lb (9.5 kg)	(6.7%)	

This was the only season where the team captains were not traded from their teams at the trade off.

=== Season 4 (2006) ===
Premiered 6 August 2006 for eight episodes.

The Fat Crushers (winners)
Members	Weight Loss	Percent	Notes
Bone Crusher, rapper	51 lb (23 kg)	(12.0%)	Team Captain, broke Phil Margera's record for total weight loss
Carnie Wilson, singer/member of Wilson Phillips	22 lb (10.0 kg)	(11.7%)	traded from Chili Con Carnie where she was team captain
Nicholas Turturro, actor	22 lb (10.0 kg)	(12.6%)	
Erika Eleniak, actress/model	31 lb (14 kg)	(20.4%)	
Hot Buttered Soul (Previously Chili Con Carnie)
Members	Weight Loss	Percent	Notes
Tina Yothers, actress	42 lb (19 kg)	(21.8%)	team captain, set record for percentage weight loss, winner
Vincent Pastore, actor	29 lb (13 kg)	(10.6%)	
Angie Stone, singer	18 lb (8.2 kg)	(7.9%)	traded from The Fat Crushers; Record for 2nd Lowest Loss
Ted Lange, actor	28 lb (13 kg)	(14.8%)	

=== Season 5 (2007): Men vs. Women ===
The fifth season of Celebrity Fit Club premiered on 22 April 2007. Unlike previous seasons, the teams were grouped by sex until the team trade. The team trade took place on 13 May 2007. This season had 8 Episodes and had up to 1.5 million viewers for some episodes.

Statistics as of 10 June 2007.

The Athletes (previously Shady Lady Bunch) (winners)
Members	Starting Weight	Final Weight	Weight Loss	Notes
Ross Mathews, comedian	214 lb (97 kg)	173 lb (78 kg)	41 (19.2%)	elected team captain after Dustin chose him to join him on the team
Maureen McCormick, actress	150 lb (68 kg)	116 lb (53 kg)	34 (22.7%)	set record for percentage weight loss, winner
Dustin Diamond, actor/comedian	217 lb (98 kg)	187 lb (85 kg)	30 (13.8%)	traded from the Regulators
Tiffany, singer	152 lb (69 kg)	124 lb (56 kg)	28 (18.4%)	
The Regulators
Members	Starting Weight	Final Weight	Weight Loss	Notes
Warren G, rapper	221 lb (100 kg)	190 lb (86 kg)	31 (14.0%)	team captain
Da Brat, rapper	172 lb (78 kg)	146 lb (66 kg)	26 (15.1%)	chosen by Kimberley to join her on the Regulators
Cledus T. Judd, country music parody singer/comedian	214 lb (97 kg)	179 lb (81 kg)	35 (16.4%)	
Kimberley Locke, singer	176 lb (80 kg)	149 lb (68 kg)	27 (15.3%)	traded from the Shady Lady Bunch where she was team captain

=== Season 6 (2008): Boot Camp ===
The sixth season, titled Celebrity Fit Club: Boot Camp, premiered on 13 March 2008 for eight episodes. The cast comprised both alumni of past seasons and newcomers. The alumni included:

Blue Team (winners)
Members	Starting Weight	Final Weight	Weight Loss	Notes
Brian Dunkleman, host/comedian	161 lb (73 kg)	146 lb (66 kg)	15 (9.3%)	Team Captain
Tina Yothers, actress,	189 lb (86 kg)	155 lb (70 kg)	34 (18.0%)	Traded from the Second Chancers
Dustin Diamond, actor/comedian	217 lb (98 kg)	194 lb (88 kg)	23 (10.6%)	Traded from the Second Chancers, original team captain of the Second Chancers
Sommore, comedian	181 lb (82 kg)	170 lb (77 kg)	11 (6.1%)	
Red Team
Members	Starting Weight	Final Weight	Weight Loss	Notes
Toccara Jones, model/host	187 lb (85 kg)	166 lb (75 kg)	21 (11.2%)	Team Captain (assumed the position after Dustin was fired for being AWOL)
Willie Aames, actor	191 lb (87 kg)	165 lb (75 kg)	26 (13.6%)	Won individual prize
Erin Moran, actress	127 lb (58 kg)	124 lb (56 kg)	3 (2.4%)	Traded from the Newbies, admitted to being on the show only for the money
A. J. Benza, host/columnist	210 lb (95 kg)	198 lb (90 kg)	12 (5.7%)	Traded from the Newbies

Note: The Blue Team were known as the Newbies for the first 5 weigh-ins of the season.

Note: The Red Team were known as the Second Chancers for the first 5 weigh-ins of the season.

Production designer Roy Rede was hired to create the season's new design. A boot camp standing set complete with an obstacle course was built in the mountains outside of Los Angeles.

=== Season 7 (2010): Boot Camp 2 ===
The seventh and final season, still titled Celebrity Fit Club: Boot Camp, premiered on 8 February 2010, with Harvey and Ian splitting the duties as host.

Blue Team (winners)
Members	Starting Weight	Final Weight	Weight Loss	Notes
Kaycee Stroh, actress, High School Musical	196 lb (89 kg)	167 lb	29 lb	Team Captain
Kevin Federline, dancer, rapper, ex-husband of Britney Spears, ex-boyfriend of Shar Jackson	232 lb (105 kg)	202 lb	30 lb	
Tanisha Thomas, reality star, season 2 of Bad Girls Club	240 lb (109 kg)	216 lb	24 lb	
Sebastian Bach, rock singer, ex-frontman of Skid Row, actor	223 lb (101 kg)	205 lb	18 lb	
Red Team
Members	Starting Weight	Final Weight	Weight Loss	Notes
Jay McCarroll, fashion designer, winner of season 1 of Project Runway	258 lb (117 kg)	218 lb	40 lb	Team Captain, won individual prize
Nicole Eggert, actress	130 lb (59 kg)	120 lb	10 lb	
Bobby Brown, R&B singer, ex-husband of Whitney Houston	199 lb (90 kg)	188 lb	11 lb	
Shar Jackson, actress, ex-girlfriend of Kevin Federline	146 lb (65 kg)	128 lb	18 lb	
