= Roland Martin (journalist) =

American political commentator and activist

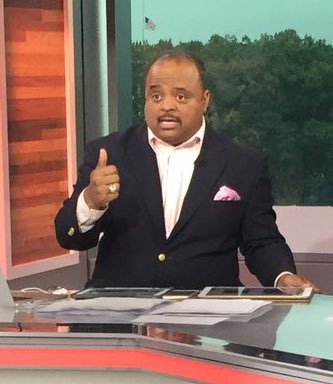
- Martin in 2017
- Born: Roland Sebastian Martin; Houston, Texas, U.S.
- Education: Texas A&M University (BS); Louisiana Baptist University (MA)
- Occupation: Commentator
- Notable credit(s): Chicago Defender, CNN
- Spouses: Deborah Duncan (m. 1993–1999) Jacquie Hood Martin (m. 2001)
- Website: rolandsmartin.com

Roland Sebastian Martin is an American political commentator for TV One as the host of both News One Now and Washington Watch with Roland Martin.

He was formerly a CNN contributor, appearing on The Situation Room, Anderson Cooper's AC360, and others. In October 2008, he joined the Tom Joyner Morning Show as senior analyst. He hosts a web series, Roland Martin Unfiltered on YouTube.

Books authored by Martin include Speak, Brother! A Black Man's View of America, Listening to the Spirit Within: 50 Perspectives on Faith and The First: President Barack Obama's Road to the White House as originally reported by Roland S. Martin and White Fear: How the Browning of America is Making White Folks Lose Their Minds.

He was part of the CNN news crew that earned a Peabody Award for its 2008 United States elections coverage.

== Early life and career ==
Martin was born in Houston, Texas. His maternal great-grandparents had migrated from Haiti to Louisiana, where his family originates. He graduated with a B.S. in journalism from Texas A&M University and a master's degree in Christian communications from Louisiana Baptist University. Martin is a life member of the National Association of Black Journalists; a life member of Alpha Phi Alpha Fraternity and a member of Sigma Pi Phi Fraternity.

He is the former executive editor of the Chicago Defender.

From 2005 to 2008, Martin hosted a morning radio talk show on WVON in Chicago. He guest-hosted Campbell Brown: No Bias, No Bull while Brown was on maternity leave in April and May 2009. In 2009, CNN was awarded a Peabody Award for its outstanding 2008 election coverage, of which Martin was a member of the news teamn.

He became the host of TV One's first Sunday News program Washington Watch with Roland Martin in 2009. It ran for 4 years. His popularity skyrocketed when he became a cable news fixture as a commentator for CNN from 2007 to 2013. CNN ratings spiked whenever Martin appeared on the cable channel’s programs.

In March 2013, Martin announced on Twitter that he was leaving CNN. His last day was on April 6, 2013.

It was announced on July 9, 2013, that Martin would be the host of TV One's first live one-hour, weekday morning news program titled NewsOne Now. The program premiered on November 4, 2013. On December 7, 2017, Martin announced on air that TV One had canceled the show due to low ratings from Black viewers, but that he would still remain involved with the network. On January 14, 2018, it was announced that Martin had won two NAACP Image Awards for the show. Martin hosted a three-hour radio show called The Roland Martin Show.

=== Roland Martin Unfiltered ===
In 2018, he launched and hosts a web series, Roland Martin Unfiltered on YouTube, offering a daily discussion of news, politics and opinion on subjects relevant to disparate Black communities. Three years later, it became the flagship for his Black Star Network, which now has seven shows.Through his Black Star Network, Martin prioritizes centering Black audiences rather than chasing mainstream validation. Ultimately, his goal is to build a lasting, scalable Black media ecosystem that ensures long-term ownership and influence. Martin’s YouTube page has grown significantly during the past 18 months to 1.9 million followers at present.

In 2025, Revolt said Martin was one of "fourteeen Black political voices in media shaping the conversation."

== Controversy ==
On February 5, 2012, Martin responded to an underwear advertisement featuring the association football player David Beckham, posting on Twitter "If a dude at your Super Bowl party is hyped about David Beckham's H&M underwear ad, smack the ish out of him!" The Gay and Lesbian Alliance Against Defamation responded on its website: "Martin's tweets today advocating violence against gay people weren't an accident — they are a part of a larger pattern for Martin. Anti-gay violence in America is a serious problem". Martin was suspended by CNN for the controversial tweets. His suspension was lifted on March 14, 2012.

In 2016, Martin leaked CNN town hall questions to former DNC Chair Donna Brazile, who then leaked them to Hillary Clinton's camp when he was acting as guest-moderator. According to Politico, in an email the day before the March town hall to senior Clinton staffers, Brazile wrote: "From time to time I get the questions in advance" and included the text of a question about the death penalty. An email later obtained by Politico showed that the text of the question Brazile sent to the Clinton campaign was identical to a proposed question Martin had offered CNN.

== Personal life ==
He is married to Jacquie Hood Martin. His wife is the author of Fulfilled! The Art and Joy of Balanced Living, and Wedded Bliss: A 52-Week Devotional to Balanced Living and the children's book series, Hannah's Heart. They reside in northern Virginia and the Dallas area.

== List of broadcasts ==
- Washington Watch with Roland Martin (2009–2013)
- NewsOne Now (2013–2017)
- The Roland Martin Show (2016, radio)
- Roland Martin Unfiltered (2018–present)

== Articles ==
- "What to really do?"
- "The new reality for Bush and the Democrats"
- "Obama Birth Issue is Nutty"
- "Roland Martin is on Watch"
