= Errol Flynns =

Street gang, founded on the lower east side of Detroit, Michigan

The Errol Flynns were a criminal organization, or street gang, founded on the lower east side of Detroit, Michigan, United States during the 1970s. Reportedly, the gang appropriated their name from the Hollywood film star Errol Flynn because they fashioned themselves as flamboyant gangsters in dress. Also, they used ‘gangsta jits’, or hand signs, to identify themselves publicly.

This semiotic use of hand gestures to display gang membership, common to contemporary American street gangs as well as hip hop culture, evolved from dances such as the "Errol Flynn", which were in themselves territorial gang symbols. In the 1970s, house parties in Detroit could be identified by gang affiliation through the type of dance party-goers performed, whether or not they were actually in the gang.

== History ==
Like other Detroit street gangs, such as their Westside Detroit counterparts in the late 1970s; the Nasty Flynns (later the NF Bangers), and 7 Mile Killers or 7 Mile Dogs or the drug consortiums of the 1980s such as Young Boys Inc., Pony Down, Best Friends, Black Mafia Family and the Chambers Brothers, the Errol Flynns grew out of the racial and economic unrest that transformed Detroit in the late 1960s and 1970s. As people and capital left Detroit for suburban communities, the city's social and economic infrastructure buckled, leaving the community fractured and impoverished. As the murder rate soared to the highest in the United States, and the city became increasingly viewed as dangerous and in perpetual decline, gangs began to seize territories.

The Errol Flynns were regarded as perhaps the most notorious group for various reasons. Firstly, they took great pride in their physical appearance and style, something that attracted a lot of youth to their parties. The poverty and urban decay percolating through Detroit made the gang lifestyle attractive to many. Secondly, Detroit underwent a demographic shift with the white flight that began in the 1950s. Many of the public housing projects such as Herman Gardens went from racially diverse communities to homogeneous black residences in a matter of years.

The Errol Flynns became a wealthy organization that dominated many criminal rackets, including extortion, robbery, and drug trafficking. The gang was also linked to several notorious mass robberies, including a hijacking and robbery of concert goers at a rock concert in Cobo Hall in 1976 that drew the Detroit riot police to the venue. Eventually, the gang grew to include almost four hundred members. This prominence had a downside though, as it brought police, public, and political attention and eventually landed many gang members in jail.

The Errol Flynn gang eventually collapsed in the 1980s, partially because of the rise of crack cocaine, which undermined the profitability of the heroin trade dominated by the Flynns. Furthermore, the successful prosecution of many gang leaders, ravaged the gang.

One member, who made a successful transition from criminal to lawful citizen turned famed jurist, is Greg Mathis: a lawyer and former Michigan judge who presided over his own Emmy-winning television court show, Judge Mathis, for 24 seasons from 1999 through 2023 (one of the longest running court show programs). Following the end of his successful Judge Mathis court show run, he began presiding over a second courtroom series, Mathis Court, currently in production. He published a memoir; Inner City Miracle, in 2002, partially chronicling his time in the gang. The Errol Flynns are recognized as the precursors to most, if not all, Detroit gangs that followed in their wake. Some of the most notable successors include the "Be Like Boys", "Dexter Boys" (an offshoot of YBI), "Schoolcraft Boys or SCB's", "SNS", "Fenkell Boys", "FMK" ("Fenkell Mafia Killers"), "7 Mile Killers or 7 Mile Dogs", "Linwood Boys", "Brewster Boys", "Jeffries Boys", and "8 Mile sconys”, (“JBFL”)“Joy Boys” or “Exit 9” All of these crews, excepting the "Be Like Boys" gang, are named after Detroit city streets or housing projects and some of these gangs still exist under new leadership.

== Former members ==
- Greg Mathis
- Dancing Dan, Earl Smith (co-founder).
