= Unsung (TV series) =

- Logo
- Country of origin: United States

Original release
- Network: TV One
- Release: November 27, 2008 – April 28, 2024

Unsung is an hour-long music documentary program that airs on TV One which premiered on November 27, 2008. It uncovers the stories behind well-known R&B and hip-hop music artists, bands, or groups which were ranked on the Billboard music charts with a string of hits, only to have their career derailed by a major crisis that caused them to be essentially unappreciated by later generations of contemporary R&B and soul music listeners. The series is produced by A. Smith & Co. Productions.

== Reception ==
After four seasons, Unsung won an NAACP Image Award in the "Outstanding Information Series or Special" category. Others nominated in this category for 2011 were Anderson Cooper 360° and Washington Watch with Roland Martin. And as of 2018, the series has garnered six NAACP Image Awards.

Recording artist Stephanie Mills has stated she is not a fan of the show. She admits that she has been approached by producers of the series to either be a commentator or the star of an episode, but she denied their requests. She does not believe she is "unsung".

== Unsung Hollywood ==
In October 2013, TV One announced Unsung would receive a spin-off titled Unsung Hollywood, to premiere on February 26, 2014. Unsung Hollywood focuses on actors and comedians, as well as prominent films and TV shows influential in the African American community. The second season of Unsung Hollywood premiered on February 11, 2015. Subjects of Unsung Hollywood have included episodes on: Pam Grier, Robin Harris, What's Happening!!, Dick Gregory, Redd Foxx, A Different World, Sheryl Underwood, Vivica A. Fox, Richard Roundtree, Charlie Murphy, Sheryl Lee Ralph, Meagan Good, Cooley High, Hill Harper, Jasmine Guy, and many others.

== Unsung films ==
In October 2015, TV One announced another spin-off under the Unsung franchise. Unsung Films will feature made-for-TV movies/biographical films.

- Miki Howard – Love Under New Management: The Miki Howard Story premiered on the network on June 12, 2016.
- Switch/Bobby DeBarge – The Bobby DeBarge Story premiered on June 29, 2019.

== List of artists, bands and groups profiled on Unsung ==
- 702
- Adina Howard
- After 7
- Al B. Sure
- Al Jarreau
- Alexander O'Neal and Cherrelle
- Avant
- Angela Bofill
- Angela Winbush
- Angie Stone
- Atlantic Starr
- Arrested Development
- Bar-Kays, The
- Betty Wright
- Big Daddy Kane
- Billy Paul
- Billy Preston
- Blaque
- Blue Magic
- Bobby Bland
- Bobby Caldwell
- Bobby V
- Bobby Womack
- Bone Thugs-n-Harmony
- Bootsy Collins
- Boys, The
- Brand Nubian
- Candi Staton (as part of The Story of Disco)
- Case
- CeCe Peniston
- Chanté Moore
- Cheryl "Pepsii" Riley
- Chic
- Chi-Lites, The
- Chingy
- Christopher Williams
- Chuck Brown
- Chuckii Booker
- Clark Sisters, The
- Con Funk Shun
- Crystal Waters
- Das EFX
- David Ruffin (formerly of The Temptations)
- Dave Hollister
- DeBarge
- Deborah Cox
- Delfonics, The
- Deniece Williams
- Digable Planets
- DJ Quik
- Dramatics, The
- Donald Lawrence
- Donell Jones
- Donna Summer (as part of The Story of Disco)
- Donny Hathaway
- Dru Hill
- E-40
- Eddie Kendricks (formerly of The Temptations)
- EPMD
- Emotions, The
- Evelyn Champagne King
- Fat Boys, The
- Fat Joe
- Florence Ballard (formerly of The Supremes)
- Force MDs
- Freddie Jackson
- Full Force
- Gerald Levert
- George Clinton
- Geto Boys
- Gil Scott-Heron
- Glenn Jones
- Goodie Mob
- H-Town
- Heatwave
- Heavy D and The Boyz
- Hezekiah Walker
- Howard Hewett
- Hi-Five
- Ike Turner
- Ice-T
- Isaac Hayes
- Jagged Edge
- James Brown
- Jean Carn
- Jennifer Holliday
- Jets, The
- Johnny Gill
- Johnnie Taylor
- Jon B
- Jones Girls, The
- Kashif
- KC and the Sunshine Band
- Keith Washington
- Kelly Price
- Kenny Lattimore
- Kid N' Play
- Klymaxx
- Kool Moe Dee
- Kurupt
- Kwame Holland
- Lakeside
- Leela James
- Lenny Williams
- Lisa Lisa & Cult Jam
- Lloyd
- Lost Boyz
- Lou Rawls
- Lyfe Jennings
- Manhattans, The
- Martha Wash
- Marvelettes, The
- Marvin Sapp
- Mary Wells
- Melba Moore
- Meli'sa Morgan
- Michel'le
- Midnight Star
- Mint Condition
- Miki Howard
- Millie Jackson
- Minnie Riperton
- Monie Love
- Monifah
- Montell Jordan
- Morris Day
- Mtume
- Musical Youth
- Mystikal
- Nate Dogg
- Naturi Naughton
- Next
- Norman Connors
- O'Jays, The
- Ohio Players, The
- Otis Redding
- Patrice Rushen
- Peaches & Herb
- Pete Rock
- Phyllis Hyman
- P.M. Dawn
- Ray Parker Jr.
- Rick James
- Rose Royce
- Roxanne Shante
- Shalamar
- Shannon
- Sheila E.
- Shirley Caesar
- Shirley Murdock
- Silk
- Skyy
- Sly & the Family Stone
- Soul for Real
- Special Ed
- Spinners, The
- Sugarhill Gang
- Stacy Lattisaw
- Stetsasonic
- Switch
- SWV
- Syleena Johnson
- Sylvers, The
- Sylvester
- Tammi Terrell
- Tasha Cobbs
- A Taste of Honey (as part of The Story of Disco)
- Teddy Pendergrass
- Teena Marie
- Thelma Houston
- Tony Terry
- Too Short
- Trick Daddy
- Troop
- Vesta Williams
- Warryn Campbell
- Whispers, The
- Whodini
- Will Downing
- Wilson Pickett
- Wyclef Jean
- Xscape
- Yarbrough and Peoples
- Yo-Yo
- Zapp (featured lead singer Roger Troutman)
