= Kill All the Things =

2017 music video by TENLo

- Title screen from the music video

Single by TENLo
- Released: December 11, 2017
- Length: 3:23
- Label: Self-released
- Songwriters: Joey Zak and TomE LaBrosse

"Kill All the Things" is a song by the band TENLo. The song's music video features actor Dustin Diamond portraying Harvey Weinstein and actress Kelly Cunningham portraying a nun. The video was directed by Joshua Mendez and filmed in Milwaukee, Wisconsin, in 2017. The video received attention from major news outlets.

== Background ==
The music video was filmed in Milwaukee, Wisconsin, during the summer of 2017. Both members of band TENLo, Joey Zak and TomE LaBrosse, are from Milwaukee. The video was released to coincide with the release of the song "Kill All the Things". Diamond had lived in the Milwaukee area since 2002. He lived in the suburb, Port Washington. The video was directed by Joshua Mendez and stars actor Dustin Diamond, best known for playing Samuel "Screech" Powers in the nineties television series Saved by the Bell. The video was released on December 25, 2017.

== Plot ==
The plot of the video for "Kill All the Things" was based on a Harvey Weinstein storyline. Zak and LaBrosse both appear in the video: Zak as a bell boy and LaBrosse as a bartender. In the video, the Harvey Weinstein character is seen doing drugs and drinking alcohol. Clearly under the influence of those intoxicants, he is then lured to a hotel room by a dark haired woman (played by Kelly Cunningham), who is revealed to be a nun. In the hotel room, Weinstein is on his back laying on a bed when he is stabbed to death by the nun in a gruesome scene.

== Reception ==
The video was covered by major news outlets like USA Today, TMZ, and The New York Times. On YouTube the video was viewed more than 100,000 times.
