= Ian K. Smith =

American physician

- Born: July 15, 1969 (age 57); Danbury, Connecticut, U.S.
- Other name: Dr. Ian
- Education: Harvard University (AB); Columbia University (MS); University of Chicago (MD)
- Occupations: Physician; author; television host
- Organization: President's Council on Sports, Fitness, and Nutrition
- Known for: 50 Million Pounds Challenge
- Notable work: The Fat Smash Diet (2006); Shred: The Revolutionary Diet (2012)
- Television: The Doctors (talk show)
- Spouse: Tristé Noelle Lieteau (m. 2005)

Ian K. Smith (born July 15, 1969) is an American physician, author and television host best known for hosting The Doctors. In 2007, he launched the 50 Million Pound Challenge, a national weight loss initiative sponsored by CVS Pharmacy and State Farm.

He has also made appearances on VH1's Celebrity Fit Club series, The View, and as a correspondent for NBC News. He is also the host of HealthWatch with Dr. Ian Smith, a daily news feature. Smith has authored a number of books related to health and weight loss, as well as three crime novels.

== Education ==
Smith and his twin brother Dana, natives of Danbury, Connecticut, graduated from Immaculate High School. Ian received a Bachelor of Arts from Harvard College in 1992, and a Masters in Science Education from Columbia University in 1993. He enrolled in Dartmouth Medical School before finishing his medical education at the University of Chicago Pritzker School of Medicine.

== Professional career ==
Smith hosts HealthWatch with Dr. Ian Smith, a nationally syndicated daily news feature heard on American Urban Radio Networks. In 2010, Smith was appointed to the President's Council on Sports, Fitness, and Nutrition.

== 50 Million Pound Challenge ==
In April 2007, Smith launched the 50 Million Pound Challenge in partnership with State Farm Insurance. The challenge was a national health initiative encouraging awareness of fitness and the risks of obesity. The Challenge was a free campaign supported by national civic and health organizations with the purpose of reducing the impact of high blood pressure, cardiac disease and obesity in the United States.

The 50 Million Pounds website developed a partnership with CVS Pharmacy. In partnership with CVS, the 50 Million Pound Challenge participated in a series of free community health events in urban communities in the United States, with a particular focus on improving health outcomes in the African-American community. CVS will hosted over 250 "To Your Health" fairs in cities such as Atlanta, Washington, D.C. and Philadelphia, providing health risk assessments and screenings for common chronic health issues including diabetes, blood pressure, high cholesterol and Osteoporosis. The fairs included celebrity guests such as Biz Markie, Steve Harvey, Patti LaBelle and Yolanda Adams.

== Writing ==
Smith has written a dozen books including The Fat Smash Diet, a 90-day diet program. His book Happy was released in April 2010. His book The Truth About Men was released in April 2012, Shred: The Revolutionary Diet was released in December 2012, and Super Shred: The Big Results Diet was published in December 2013. In 2015, Smith published The Shred Diet Cookbook and The Shred Power Cleanse.

He has written articles and essays for Time, Newsweek, Men's Health, and the New York Daily News, and has been featured in other publications including People, Essence, Ebony, Cosmopolitan, and University of Chicago Medicine on the Midway.

Smith later began writing fiction novels, starting with The Blackbird Chronicles in 2005, about a murdered Dartmouth professor. Smith later wrote The Ancient Nine (2018) and The Unspoken (2020), with the latter being the first in a planned series about Ashe Cayne, a black police officer who refuses to participate in police corruption. Smith has said that The Unspoken was inspired by the real life murder of Laquan McDonald.

== Television ==
Smith co-hosted season six of the health talk show The Doctors in 2014-2015. From 2020 to 2021, he was brought back as the sole host, although he left in a dispute over racial discrimination in at the company.

Smith was the medical and diet expert on VH1's Celebrity Fit Club.

== Personal life ==
Ian Smith married health executive Tristé Noelle Lieteau on May 29, 2005. In 2018, the couple sold their townhome in the South Loop and moved to a mansion in Kenwood, Chicago.

== Works ==
=== Non-fiction ===
- The Take Control Diet: A Life Plan for Thinking People (2001). ISBN 9780375507304
- The Fat Smash Diet (2006). ISBN 9780977688906
- Extreme Fat Smash Diet (2007). ISBN 9780312371203
- The 4 Day Diet (2009). ISBN 9780312373580
- Happy: Simple Steps to Get the Most Out of Life (2010). ISBN 9780312606350
- EAT: The Effortless Weight Loss Solution (2011). ISBN 9780312548438
- Shred: The Revolutionary Diet (2012). ISBN 9781250035868
- The Truth About Men: The Secret Side of the Opposite Sex (2012). ISBN 9781250004277
- Super Shred: The Big Results Diet (2013). ISBN 9781250044532
- The Shred Diet Cookbook (2015). ISBN 9781250061218
- The Shred Power Cleanse (2015).
- Blast the Sugar Out! (2017). ISBN 9781250130136
- The Clean 20 (2018). ISBN 9781250182067
- Clean and Lean (2019). ISBN 9781250114945
- Mind over Weight (2020). ISBN 9781250244819
- Fast Burn! the power of negative energy balance (2021). ISBN 9781250271587
- Plant Power (2022). ISBN 9781250278036

=== Fiction (as Ian Smith) ===
- The Blackbird Papers (2004). ISBN 9781415953389
- The Ancient Nine (2018). ISBN 9781250182395
- The Unspoken (2020). ISBN 9781542025270
