= Judge Mathis =

American reality court show (1999–2023)

- Genre: Arbitration-based reality court show
- Presented by: Judge Greg Mathis; Brendan Anthony Moran; Kevin Lingle; Doyle Devereux
- Narrated by: William Price
- Music by: Roy Shakked (1999–2008); Brian Wayy (2003–2023 (intro only); 2008–2023)
- Country of origin: United States
- No. of seasons: 24
- No. of episodes: 3,000+

Production
- Production locations: WMAQ-TV NBC Tower; Chicago, Illinois
- Camera setup: Multiple
- Running time: 60 minutes
- Production companies: AND Syndicated Productions; Telepictures Productions; Warner Bros. Television Distribution; Black Pearl Entertainment (1999–2002)

Original release
- Network: Syndication
- Release: September 13, 1999 – May 25, 2023

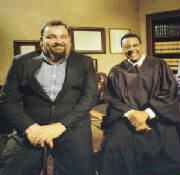
Mathis (right) and Shannon Whisnant

Judge Mathis is an American arbitration-based reality court show presided over by Judge Greg Mathis, a former judge of Michigan's 36th District Court and Black-interests motivational speaker/activist.

The series ran for 24 seasons from September 13, 1999, to May 25, 2023. The series ran in first-run syndication during its active years. The series saw Judge Greg Mathis adjudicating small claims disputes from his studio courtroom set. The series is NAACP Image Award winning, as well as the first court show featuring an African American jurist to win Daytime Emmy Award for Outstanding Legal/Courtroom Program.

The series was produced by Telepictures Productions and AND Syndicated Productions, while distributed by Warner Bros. Domestic Television Distribution. The courtroom series was filmed in front of a studio audience at the NBC Tower in Chicago, but included cases and litigants from other American jurisdictions. As Divorce Court and The People's Court faced numerous judge-role casting changes, Mathis is the second longest reigning judge in television court show history, behind only Judy Sheindlin (Judge Judy and Judy Justice) by 3 years.

In February 2023, late into its final season, it was confirmed that the 24th season would be its last. Shortly after, Byron Allen's Allen Media Group had ordered a new series starring Mathis and his son Amir as bailiff. His subsequent court show is entitled Mathis Court with Judge Mathis, which began in syndication by September 11, 2023, on Justice Central.

Judge Mathis currently continues to air in reruns.

== Judge Greg Mathis ==
=== Case handling and adjudicating approach ===
Mathis typically began proceedings by immediately giving the plaintiff the floor, having him/her expound on their side of the dispute in its entirety to gain insight into the matters. Mathis subsequently granted the defendant the same opportunity. Cases on Judge Mathis tended to go deeper and to more revealing places than those of most other court shows. He called attention to peculiarities or juicy details exposed throughout the proceedings as a means of making the cases more stimulating to viewers. More open and unreserved in his personal beliefs than other judges, Mathis never hesitated to tackle serious, topical societal issues, political and mental health matters, and any other touchy subjects that emerged during the proceedings. Not one to shy away from disclosing his liberal mindset, Mathis tied in his social justice and rehabilitation perspectives into the cases.

While hearing the testimonies, Mathis took on a relaxed, attentive, understanding, and open-minded nature. Rarely missing an opportunity to jest or poke fun, however, Mathis was given to wit, joking and humor, also good-natured ridicule and ribbing of the parties, often rousing his audience to uproarious amusement. He sometimes cut the tension–even tension he had fostered–with wisecracks or playfully taunting remarks. Mathis had bantered directly at audience members on occasion, also resulting in audience amusement. A trademark, Mathis sporadically used a rather high-pitched voice to stultify litigants in a manner that suggests they've acted foolishly or have not recognized the obvious.

Combined with his teasing and comedic tendencies on the bench, Mathis was known for his street smart; urban expressions; and, once he had closely observed, reasoned back and forth and taken a stance on the litigants and matters brought before him, his stern, shaming and firmly lecturing side as well. Occasionally, Mathis left the courtroom to deliberate and then returned with his verdict. Upon final judgment, he would briefly explain the legal principle guiding his verdict, especially if his ruling was based on a particular state's law. Reportedly, Mathis's rulings conformed to the laws of the state where the case was originally filed. In recent years, the show began to conduct paternity testing in disputes about child custody, and drug testing if applicable. Mathis often offered or compeled drug treatment and family counseling for those parties in need.

=== Coming-of-age journey fused with court show ===
As a child and teenage delinquent, Mathis found himself embroiled in frequent legal woes. He was a member of a street gang in Detroit, and he was arrested and sentenced to jail for illegally carrying a firearm when he was 17 years old.

Mathis was brought up in one of the worst housing projects in Detroit while raised by a single mother. During his youth, he was involved with gangs (most notably the Errol Flynns gang), dropped out of school and spent time behind bars. Growing up as a gang member and heroin dealer in the mean streets of Detroit, Michigan, Mathis had done plenty of time in juvenile detention centers before age 17. All this changed when a judge gave him an ultimatum—either get a G.E.D. or go to jail. At the same time, Mathis found out his mother was dying of cancer. Rushing to her side, he promised her he'd turn his life around, which he did: he attended college, attended law school, earned a Juris Doctor degree, and passed the bar.

Mathis had frequently used his courtroom series to highlight his troubled-youth-turned-success story as a way of motivating and inspiring his audience (especially the youth audience) that there's no adversity that they can't pick themselves up from. It was from his background that Mathis derived much of his arbitration formula and television show theme. For example, the court show's title sequence music video throughout the early seasons of the program consisted of a brief dedication to Mathis's life story, Mathis narrating with the lines: "Where I grew up, life was rough; we had to make do. And I was arrested several times as a juvenile delinquent. My mom told me she was about to die. I made my commitment that I would change my life. I bring a sense of tough life and compassion to the courtroom." Mathis later shared that he took the job as television arbitrator on the condition that his life story was shared as part of the opening for each episode.

In the same likeness of his experience, Mathis took a distinct admiration for litigants who had seen the error of their troubled ways and had made efforts to improve and better their lives. Mathis also made efforts to promote treatment and programs for individuals struggling with drug and alcohol addictions.

== Veteran court show status and honors ==
=== Outlasting other court shows and TV judges ===
By the 2014–15 television season, Judge Mathis made it to its 16th season, making Mathis the longest-serving African American and Black court show arbitrator, surpassing Joe Brown (Judge Joe Brown), whose program lasted 15 seasons. Moreover, Mathis held the record for second-longest serving court show arbitrator ever, just behind Judge Judy Sheindlin, the presiding judge of the court show Judge Judy and its spin-off series Judy Justice.

Judge Mathis entered its milestone 20th season on Monday, September 3, 2018, and the 24th season of the program was its last. (2022–23). The success of Judge Mathis was particularly noteworthy in that, generally speaking, court show programming had a very limited shelf life. The programs in this genre are lucky to make it past a few seasons. Judge Mathis was the fourth longest-running courtroom series behind Judge Judy, The People's Court (2nd longest running), and Divorce Court (longest running). Though both Divorce Court and The People's Court have experienced a series of cancellations/revival reincarnations and shifting arbitrators, Judge Mathis had not. Consequently, of the court shows with a single production life, Judge Mathis was the second longest-running (second only to Judge Judy by three seasons).

During its final 2 seasons, it reigned as one of the longest running court shows (having premiered in 1999) with only 2 other programs: Divorce Court (1957) and The People's Court (1981). Of these three court shows, only Judge Mathis had not suffered temporary cancellations amid its series run. Also of the three, Mathis was the only arbitrator to have hosted his program for the entirety of its series run.

=== Court show success vs. congressional run opportunity ===
From 2017 into early 2018 during the program's 19th season, Mathis considered ending his courtroom series as he was heavily encouraged by his hometown community to run for congressman of Detroit, Michigan. Due to the successful direction and longevity of his television series, Mathis eventually opted against the congressional opportunity in favor of carrying on the Judge Mathis program. Mathis stated he would like to do his court show for as long as he can. In Mathis's words, “It’s really not up to me. It’s up to the viewers. I enjoy what we do, particularly the last several years, when we were able to focus a lot more and put more resources, thanks to Warner Brothers and Telepictures, toward changing lives." Mathis expressed value in his court show's influence on drug and alcohol addicts to enroll in rehabilitation, its offering of paternity test results to litigators and providing counseling to troubled parties.

=== 20th season anniversary ===
Mathis had stated that from the beginning, he only expected his court show to last 3 seasons. Judge Mathis was one of the longest-running, successful programs in the court show genre. Since the 2018–19 television season, it was one of two courtroom programs to have existed for two decades under one arbitrator. As of fall 2021 with the departure of Judge Judy, Judge Mathis was the only program currently still in production to have existed for over two decades under one arbitrator.

=== Awards ===
Judge Greg Mathis's "inspirational and positive messages to young people" won the court show a PRISM Commendation in May 2002. The court show went on to win an NAACP Image Award for Outstanding News/Information – Series in 2004. In April 2018, the court show won a Daytime Emmy Award for Outstanding Legal/Courtroom Program, just ahead of making its milestone 20th season.

When Judge Mathis was crowned the winner of the Daytime Emmy Award in 2018, it became the first courtroom series with an African American jurist to win the award. In his acceptance speech for his first-ever Emmy win, he credited his diverse staff of females and minorities:

We are very proud and honored to have been awarded this Emmy. And after 20 years, I'm so happy for my staff in particular and the diversity that they represent. The majority of our staff are females and minorities. And in this day of the Me Too movement, I think this shows that if you hire more women and have a more diverse staff, you'll win.

On May 4, 2022, Mathis was honored with a star on the Hollywood Walk of Fame.

== Production and broadcast specifics ==
=== On-air format, broadcast schedule, execution methods ===
Each episode ran for one hour and typically consisted of 4 cases. The show is broadcast five days a week in every U.S. state, as well as Canada through Omni Television.

The cases on Judge Mathis were classified as tort law civil disputes with a maximum $5,000 claim, a typical amount for small claims court. The producers of the show selected the cases. To acquire cases, the show solicited real-life litigants with pending disputes or individuals with potential disputes.

If litigants agreed to be on the show, they were paid a talent fee ranging from $150 to $300, and they received travel accommodations. Mathis had prior knowledge of the cases. In all cases, litigants gave their prospective case managers all evidence in advance. Any outside legal case pending had to be dismissed by both parties.

Typically, Mathis's producers only looked for cases that they deemed juicy and sensational enough for television.

=== Location ===
Each case's litigators entered the second-floor studio at the NBC Tower separately and pled their case in front of a studio audience. The show paid for the litigants' travel and hotel fees, provided by a small stipend for those selected to appear before Mathis, standard practice for courtroom television programming.

Mathis, which filmed from the NBC Tower in Chicago, Illinois, reported that production consulted him about shooting the court show from Los Angeles, California. Production had expressed interest in Mathis being closer to the rest of the celebrity industry. Although he considered this suggestion, Mathis vehemently denied the option. In Mathis's words, "I didn't want to interrupt the success. I felt that it was working well, so why disturb that? Secondly, I just love Chicago a lot more than Los Angeles.”

=== COVID-19 precautionary updates for season 22 ===
Like most television program seasons premiering in the fall of 2020 amid the COVID-19 pandemic, Judge Mathis was forced to enter into a new season (its 22nd) in resourceful fashion. As Judge Mathis cases were pre-taped well in advance of airing for editing purposes, the program had to shoot cases during the height of the pandemic.

Unlike other courtroom programs, Greg Mathis, Doyle, the litigators and the audience all initially presented in person (as opposed to virtually). That being said, by September 7, 2020, when the series premiered its 22nd season, there were a host of on-set precautionary measures in place: a significantly depopulated courtroom audience; all members of the audience widely distanced from one another; all audience members wearing clear plastic face shields; Bailiff Doyle wearing a disposable surgical face mask; a structure bearing a large window placed between Judge Mathis and his litigators; etc. In this manner, Mathis and his litigators all remained unmasked throughout the court proceedings.

These COVID-19 measures were later updated that same season: the litigants, along with their witnesses if necessary, presented testimony from remote locations through webcam. Video monitors were set up in Mathis's courtroom on the litigant podiums. Mathis himself along with Bailiff Doyle presented to the courtroom in person, however.

== Bailiffs and supporting roles ==
Judge Mathis's final bailiff, Doyle Devereux had been with the program for most of its series run, since January 2003, midway into the court show's 4th season. It was revealed in an Hour Detroit news publication that Devereux was never a real-life bailiff, however, rather an actor cast by the program to play the role of one. In Doyle's words, "The show is real, the cases are real, you guys are real. If there’s something that could be a little fake about this show, it’s me."

Before Devereux, Kevin Lingle was the court show's bailiff for a short duration during the show's 4th season as well.

The court show's first bailiff, Brendan Anthony Moran, died on December 19, 2002, after he fell to his death from the balcony of his 24th-floor Chicago condo. His death was ruled a suicide, although Mathis and Moran's family thought differently.

In the first season of the Judge Mathis show, Leslie Merrill, a former news anchor for WPGH Pittsburgh became the show's court reporter. Her role was to interview the litigants after Judge Mathis passed judgment and rendered his verdict on each case, and left after season 1. For the remainder of the series' run, Judge Mathis did not have a court reporter.

== Crossovers and other media personalities ==
- In a September 2014 Rickey Smiley Morning Show interview, Judge Mathis expressed praise towards his courtroom rivals. In the interview, he was asked what three other court show judges he'd most enjoy sharing a meal with. For his first choice, he answered "Are you kidding? It would be Judge Judy at the head of the table. Oh, my goodness, that Judge Judy is something else." His second choice was Judge Marilyn Milian, and his third was Judge Mills Lane.
- On October 29, 2015, during a 17th season episode of Judge Mathis, People's Court arbitrator Judge Marilyn Milian made a surprise appearance on Judge Mathis, interrupting one of Mathis's courtroom proceedings. In the episode, she entered through the door to the left of the bench that Judge Mathis uses to enter and exit the courtroom and states, "Hey, hey, hey! Excuse me! Let a real judge do this." Following that, she exchanged greetings and hugs with Judge Mathis, who responded, "That's right. She taught me all I know, the best judge on The People's Court. I'm going to get some consultation from her in the back." In response, Judge Milian stated, "The realest [sic] judge I know."
- In a January 2018 interview, Mathis suggested that he tried emulating Judge Judy early on and received input that his gender and race made this approach short-lived. In speaking in the early days of his courtroom series, Mathis stated:
  I tried to be like Judge Judy. And she was mean all the time. And then ultimately [my] producers said, ‘Well, no, an older white woman can talk to white folks like that, but a young black man can't.’ So I learned that lesson early on. White folks love to see black people sing and dance. So instead I decided to just be myself.

Judge Mathis also took care to note of his high opinion of Judge Judy. He stated that he did not deserve Sheindlin's salary, that her salary is owed to her because of her impressive ratings, and that she even "ran Oprah off television" with ratings that surpassed The Oprah Winfrey Show at various points of that show's run, such as Oprah's final season.
