= NAACP Image Award for Outstanding News, Talk or Information – Series =

Former American television award

These are the NAACP Image Award winners for Outstanding News, Talk or Information - Series, a category that was introduced in 1992 and brought back in 1996 and was reestablished in 1998 until 2003.

== Winners and Nominees ==
| Year | Television Series | Nominees |
|---|---|---|
| 1992 | The Oprah Winfrey Show | |
| 1996 | The Oprah Winfrey Show | "60 Minutes" "Both Sides with Jesse Jackson" "Charlie Rose" "Dateline NBC" |
| 1998 | The Oprah Winfrey Show | "48 Hours" "ABC News Nightline"; America's Black Forum "Public Eye with Bryant Gumbel" |
| 1999 | BET Tonight with Ed Gordon | "20/20" "Dateline NBC" "Charlie Rose" "The Oprah Winfrey Show" |
| 2000 | BET Tonight with Ed Gordon | "American Justice" "Biography" "Dateline NBC" "The Oprah Winfrey Show" |
| 2001 | BET Tonight with Ed Gordon | "60 Minutes" "Access Hollywood" "Behind the Music" "The Oprah Winfrey Show" |
| 2002 | "20/20" | "ABC World News Tonight with David Muir" "BET Tonight with Ed Gordon" "Biography" "Diary" |

== Multiple Wins and Nominations ==
Wins

- 3 (BET Tonight with Ed Gordon, The Oprah Winfrey Show)

Nominations

- 6 (The Oprah Winfrey Show)
- 4 (BET Tonight with Ed Gordon)
- 3 (Dateline NBC)
- 2 (20/20, 60 Minutes, Biography, Charlie Rose)

== See also ==
- List of American television awards
