= NAACP Image Award for Outstanding News, Talk or Information – Special =

Former American television award

The NAACP Image Award for Outstanding News, Talk, Or Information - Special was an award formed out of the award Outstanding News, Talk or Information, which started in 1989 and lasted until 1996 when the award was split into two categories; one for Series and one for Special.

In 1997 the awards for series and special where merged into Outstanding News, Talk or Information Series/Special. Then Special was split into a separate award again in 1998, where it remained as a category until 2003 when it was remerged into a single category Outstanding News, Talk or Information - Series or Special. These are the winners for Outstanding News, Talk, or Information - Special.

== Winners and nominees ==
Year	Special	Nominees
1996	CNN Special Coverage: The Million Man March	"Biography" for episode "Colin Powell" "Conversation with Ed Gordon: Johnnie Cochran"; Hoop Dreams "Mandela's Fight for Freedom"
1998	Dinner with Oprah: A Lifetime Exclusive - Toni Morrison	"Are You Black, White or What?"; Biography for episode "Cinque--Freedom Fighter"" "Ships of Slaves: The Middle Passage"; When We Were Kings
1999	4 Little Girls	"Africans in America: America's Journey Through Slavery"; Biography for episode "Nat King Cole - Loved in Return"; Intimate Portrait for episode "Patti LaBelle" "Motown 40: The Music Is Forever"
2000	True Life For episode "I Am Driving While Black"	ABC News Nightline for episode "Found Voices - Slave Narratives" "I'll Make Me a World" "The Black Press: Soldiers Without Swords" "Wonders of the African World with Henry Louis Gates Jr."
2001	BET Tonight with Ed Gordon for special "Black & Blue: A Town Hall Meeting In New York City"	60 Minutes Wednesday for special "Death by Denial (Aids In Africa)"; Biography for special "Sally Hemings: Redefining History" "The Greatest Boxer: Muhammad Ali" "Half Past Autumn: The Life and Works of Gordon Parks"
2002	BET Tonight Special: Aaliyah	"America's I.O.U.: Slave Reparations" "2001 U.S. Open Final: Williams Vs. Williams" "ABC News Nightline for special "Cincinnati: A City Searching for Justice & Peace""; Dateline NBC for special "Lisa Jefferson & United Flight 93's Todd Beamer"

== Multiple wins and nominations ==
They were no multiple winners, however Biography, ABC News Nightline, and BET Tonight were nominated four times, two times, and two times, respectively.

== See also ==
- List of American television awards
