= List of American television awards =

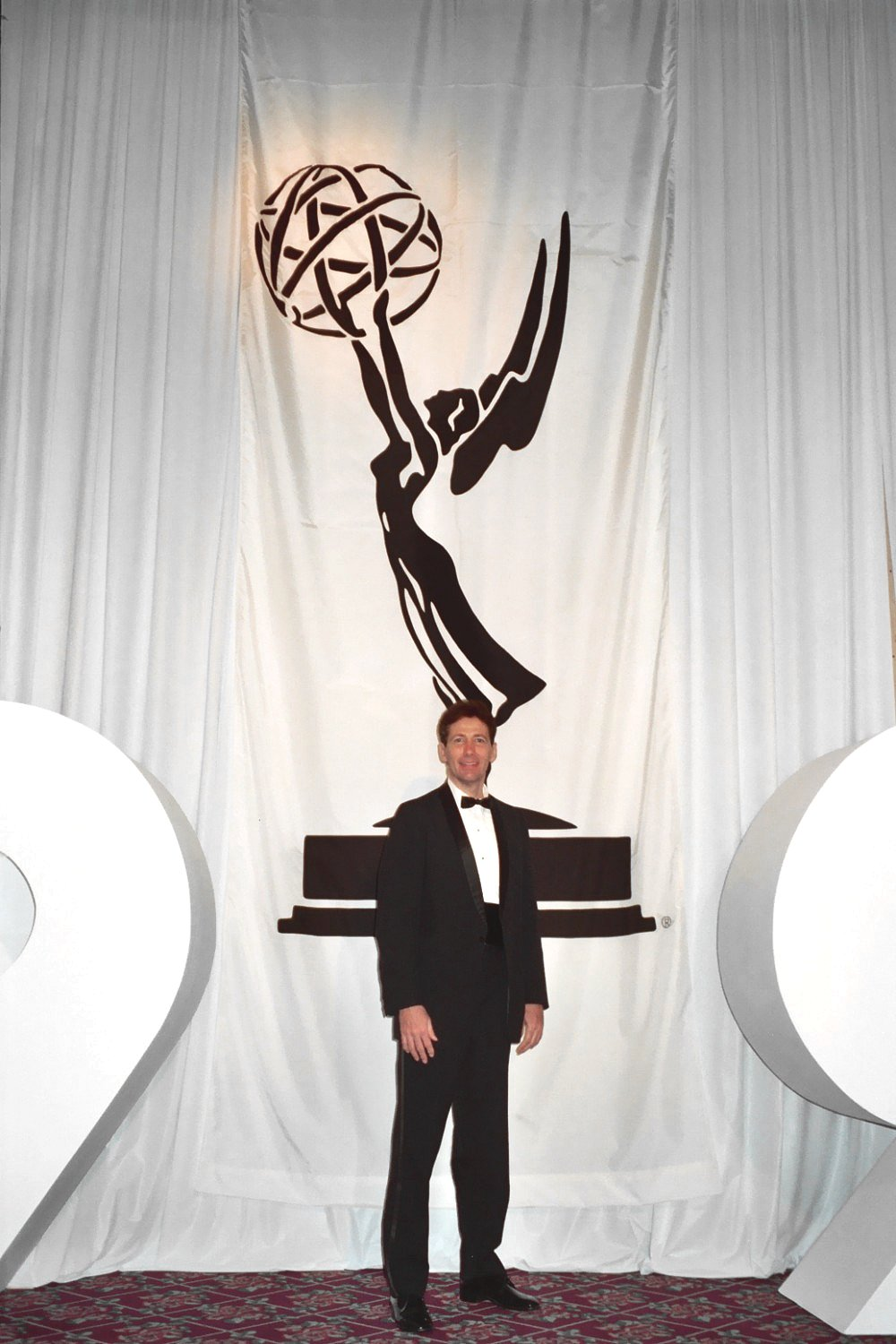
1994 Emmys

Notable awards have been given by several organizations for contributions in various fields of television in the United States. The most notable are the Emmy Awards, considered as one of the four major performing art awards in the country.

== Emmy Awards ==
The Emmy Awards are an extensive range of awards for artistic and technical merit for the television industry. They are awarded at various area-specific ceremonies held throughout the calendar year. Three related, but separate, organizations present the Emmy Award: the Academy of Television Arts & Sciences (ATAS), the National Academy of Television Arts & Sciences (NATAS), and the International Academy of Television Arts and Sciences (IATAS).

Emmy Awards include:

Award	Sponsor	Notes
Children's and Family Emmy Awards	NATAS	Excellence in American national children's and family-oriented television programming.
Daytime Emmy Awards	NATAS	Excellence in American national daytime programming.
International Emmy Awards	IATAS	Excellence in programming originally produced and aired outside the US.
News and Documentary Emmy Awards	NATAS	Excellence in American national news and documentary programming.
Primetime Emmy Awards	ATAS	Excellence in American national primetime programming.
Regional Emmy Awards	ATAS and NATAS	Excellence in American local programming.
Sports Emmy Awards	NATAS	Excellence in American national sports programming.
Technology and Engineering Emmy Awards	NATAS	Outstanding achievement in technical or engineering development.

== General ==
Award	Sponsor	Notes
American Reality Television Awards	Academy of Reality Television	Recognizes talent on screen and behind the scenes of reality television.
Annie Awards	ASIFA-Hollywood	Best animated programming in television, film, and multimedia.
Critics' Choice Television Award	Broadcast Television Journalists Association	Best in television.
Dorian Awards	GALECA: The Society of LGBTQ Entertainment Critics	LGBTQ+ critics and entertainment journalists honor television, as well as film and Broadway, mainstream to LGBTQ audiences.
Game Show Awards	Wilshire Theatre in Beverly Hills, California	Best in game shows, only presented on June 6, 2009.
Genesis Awards	Humane Society of the United States	Awarded to individuals in the major news and entertainment media for producing outstanding works which raise public awareness of animal issues.
Global TV Demand Awards	Parrot Analytics	Most popular television shows in the world.
GLAAD Media Awards	GLAAD Gay & Lesbian Alliance Against Defamation	Outstanding representations of the lesbian, gay, bisexual and transgender community and the issues that affect their lives.
Golden Collar Awards	Dog News Daily	Best canine actors.
Golden Globe Awards	Golden Globe Foundation	Excellence in film, both American and International, and in American television.
Humanitas Prize	Humanitas Prize	Film and television writing promoting human dignity, meaning and freedom.
Iris Award	National Association of Television Program Executives	American awards for local television programming excellence.
MTV Movie & TV Awards	MTV	Popularity in film and television.
National Reality Television Awards	IEG Global and National Media Group	The best in reality television.
Peabody Award	University of Georgia	Distinguished achievement and meritorious public service by television and radio stations, networks, producing organizations, individuals, and the internet.
Soap Opera Digest Awards	Soap Opera Digest magazine	Defunct awards ceremony for excellence in the soap opera genre.
Television Academy Honors	Academy of Television Arts & Sciences	Television programming that inspires, informs, motivates and even has the power to change lives.
Young Artist Awards	Young Artist Association	Excellence of youth performers.
Young Hollywood Awards	Penske Media Corp. (Variety magazine)	Honored television programs and young performers.
Women in Film & Video-DC Women of Vision Awards	Women in Film and Television International DC chapter	Women's creative and technical achievements in media.
Women in Film Crystal + Lucy Awards	Women in Film and Television International LA chapter	Excellence in entertainment.

== News and information ==
Award	Sponsor	Notes
Edward R. Murrow Award (Washington State University)	Edward R. Murrow College of Communication of Washington State University	Commitment to excellence that exemplifies the career of Edward R. Murrow.
Edward Murrow Award (Overseas Press Club of America)	Overseas Press Club	Best television interpretation or documentary on international affairs.
Edward R. Murrow Award (Radio Television Digital News Association)	Radio Television Digital News Association	Outstanding achievements in electronic journalism.
NAACP Image Award for Outstanding News, Talk or Information – Special	NAACP	Award for people of color in non-fiction specials.
NAACP Image Award for Outstanding News, Talk or Information – Series	NAACP	Award for people of color in non-fiction series.

== Technical ==
Award	Sponsor	Notes
Cinema Audio Society Award for Outstanding Achievement in Sound Mixing for Television Movie or Limited Series	Cinema Audio Society	Award for sound mixing in limited series.
Cinema Audio Society Award for Outstanding Achievement in Sound Mixing for Television Series – Half Hour	Cinema Audio Society	Award for sound mixing in half-hour television series.
Cinema Audio Society Award for Outstanding Achievement in Sound Mixing for Television Series – One Hour	Cinema Audio Society	Award for sound mixing in one-hour television series.
Golden Reel Award for Outstanding Achievement in Sound Editing – Dialogue and ADR for Episodic Long Form Broadcast Media	Motion Picture Sound Editors	Award for dubbing, mixing, or re-recording on television.
Hollywood Post Alliance Award for Outstanding Color Grading - Television	Hollywood Professional Association	Award for color grading on television.
Hollywood Post Alliance Award for Outstanding Editing - Television (30 Minutes and Under)	Hollywood Professional Association	Award for editing in half-hour television series.
Hollywood Post Alliance Award for Outstanding Editing - Television (Over 30 Minutes)	Hollywood Professional Association	Award for editing in one-hour television series.
Hollywood Post Alliance Award for Outstanding Sound - Television	Hollywood Professional Association	Award for sound on television.

== See also ==
- List of television awards
