= Tavis Smiley (TV series) =

- Logo of Tavis Smiley
- Genre: Talk show
- Presented by: Tavis Smiley
- Country of origin: United States
- Original language: English
- No. of seasons: 9

Production
- Production locations: Los Angeles, California, New York City, New York (secondary)
- Running time: 30 minutes
- Production companies: KCET (2004–2011); WNET (2011–2017); The Smiley Group, Inc (2004–2017)

Original release
- Network: PBS
- Release: January 2004 – December 13, 2017

Tavis Smiley is an American late-night talk show hosted by journalist Tavis Smiley that aired weeknights on PBS. The show began airing in January 2004 and was filmed in Los Angeles, California, making it the first west-coast talk show for PBS.

== Broadcast history ==
The show was occasionally filmed in New York City, at the Lincoln Center studios of WNET. The show features notable entertainers, athletes, politicians, authors, and other noteworthy individuals in a 30-minute interview that explores the lives of the guests and the current events. Tavis Smiley is a production of The Smiley Group, Inc and New York station WNET, with major funding from Wal-Mart.

During the first eight seasons, the show was taped at the studios of KCET which served as the flagship PBS station for the West Coast until its separation from PBS in December 2010, moving the flagship name to KOCE-TV. From January 2011, New York station WNET took over production of the show with some episodes originating out of WNET's studio in Lincoln Center but the show remained at the KCET studios for the remainder of the eighth season. The ninth season began on January 19, 2012 and debuted a new studio at the Encompass Digital Media Studios, nearby downtown Los Angeles. The show continued to tape episodes in both New York and Los Angeles.

=== Cancelation ===
On December 13, 2017, PBS indefinitely suspended distribution of the show after an investigation discovered allegations of sexual misconduct. Smiley is accused of engaging in sexual relationships with multiple employees as well as "creating a verbally abusive and threatening environment."

On December 19, 2017, the BBC and PBS announced that the show would be replaced by simulcasts of the BBC News shows Beyond 100 Days and World News Today, which would begin airing on PBS on January 2, 2018.
