= Washington Watch with Roland Martin =

- Genre: News program
- Presented by: Roland Martin
- Country of origin: United States
- Original language: English

Production
- Production location: Washington, D.C.

Original release
- Network: TV One
- Release: 2009 – 2013

Washington Watch with Roland Martin is an American television news program hosted by Roland Martin and aired on TV One. The series began airing in 2009. In 2011, it was nominated for an Image Award for "Outstanding News, Talk, or Information Series." The show ended its four-year series run in May 2013.
