= Oprah: Where Are They Now? =

American reality television series

- Genre: Reality
- Presented by: Oprah Winfrey
- Country of origin: United States
- Original language: English
- No. of seasons: 9
- No. of episodes: 108

Production
- Executive producers: Jonathan Sinclair; Jill Van Lokeren; Heather Aldridge; Julie Simpson; Veronica Votypka
- Running time: 40–43 minutes
- Production company: Harpo Studios

Original release
- Network: Oprah Winfrey Network
- Release: October 2, 2012 – February 11, 2017

Related
- The Oprah Winfrey Show

Oprah: Where Are They Now? is an American reality television series on the Oprah Winfrey Network. The series debuted on October 2, 2012, and looks back at what happened to some of the biggest headline makers on The Oprah Winfrey Show plus updates on their current life.

On January 5, 2013, The Oprah Winfrey Network released its 2013 programming and announced that the series has been renewed for a second season. Season two premiered on Tuesday March 19, 2013 and features episodes that bring viewers updates on the following Oprah Show guests: Omarosa, Bow Wow, "Octomom" Nadya Suleman, Dennis Rodman, Gennifer Flowers and Heidi Fleiss. The second half of the season debuted on July 28, 2013, and features: Favorite American Idol contestants, Fab Morvan from Milli Vanilli, Ted Haggard, Anna Nicole Smith's daughter Danielynn and Danielynn's father Larry Birkhead, Fabio Lanzoni, Donald Trump's ex-wife Marla Maples, Molly Ringwald, Erin Brockovich, Diff'rent Strokes actor Todd Bridges, The Partridge Family stars Danny Bonaduce and David Cassidy, The Brady Bunch stars Barry Williams, Christopher Knight, Susan Olsen, and Mike Lookinland.

The show went on to have a further 7 seasons, spanning 4 more years and bringing its total to 9 seasons and 6 year run.

== Episodes ==
Season	Episodes	Originally released	
Season	Episodes	First released	Last released
1	7	October 2, 2012	November 27, 2012
2	20	March 19, 2013	December 22, 2013
3	8	January 3, 2014	February 21, 2014
4	12	June 8, 2014	August 24, 2014
5	12	October 5, 2014	January 1, 2015
6	10	March 8, 2015	May 23, 2015
7	18	September 19, 2015	April 30, 2016
8	18	August 13, 2016	December 17, 2016
9	3	January 28, 2017	February 11, 2017

=== Season 1 (2012) ===
No. overall	No. in season	Title	Original release date	U.S. viewers (millions)
1	1	The Children Oprah Never Forgot	October 2, 2012	0.43
2	2	Mary Jo Buttafuoco, and the Woman Addicted to Plastic Surgery	October 9, 2012	0.43
3	3	Rodney King's Last Interview, and Newsmakers Kato Kaelin, and Shannon Faulkner	October 16, 2012	0.44
4	4	Pop Stars Hanson, the Child Who Wanted a Sex Change, and the Heroin Family	October 23, 2012	0.33
5	5	Single Alaskan Men, a Cheating Husband, and a Sexy Mom Who Got a Makeunder	November 13, 2012	0.42
6	6	7 Year Old Schizophrenic, a Man Who Lost 259 Lbs, and a Dirty Dancing Reunion	November 20, 2012	0.35
7	7	The Pregnant Man, the Mom Who Spied on Her Daughter, and the Somoano Quints	November 27, 2012	0.33

=== Season 2 (2013) ===
No. overall	No. in season	Title	Original release date	U.S. viewers (millions)
8	1	Dennis Rodman, Gennifer Flowers and Nadya Suleman	March 19, 2013	0.44
9	2	Sinbad, Disgraced Olympian Marion Jones and Candace Bushnell	March 26, 2013	0.34
10	3	Omarosa and Starsky & Hutch's Paul Michael Glaser	April 2, 2013	0.28
11	4	Columbine Survivors Today, Mike Tyson and the Bachelors and Bachelorettes	April 9, 2013	0.26
12	5	Chandra Levy's Parents and Ryan White's Mom Today	April 21, 2013	0.44
13	6	Heidi Fleiss, Bow Wow All Grown Up and Tribute to Roger Ebert	April 28, 2013	0.54
14	7	Oprah’s Sister, Actress Denise Richards and Survivor Winner Richard Hatch	July 28, 2013	0.65
15	8	Life After Scandal: Milli Vanilli's Fab Morvan, Marla Maples and Danny Bonaduce	August 4, 2013	0.53
16	9	American Idol's Brian Dunkleman and Anna Nicole Smith's 6-Year-Old Daughter	August 11, 2013	0.89
17	10	Fabio, Todd Bridges, and Erin Brockovich	August 18, 2013	0.63
18	11	The Brady Bunch, Oprah's Teen Crush, and '70s Star David Cassidy at Home	August 25, 2013	0.85
19	12	'80s Teen Queen Molly Ringwald and Pastor Ted Haggard	September 1, 2013	0.43
20	13	Michael Bolton, Jon Gosselin, Soleil Moon Frye and Wonder Woman Lynda Carter	November 3, 2013	N/A
21	14	Tori Spelling, RuPaul, Sully Sullenberger, Debbie Matenopoulos and Jenna Jameson	November 10, 2013	N/A
22	15	Hulk Hogan, Carrot Top, and J.Lo's Former Husband Cris Judd	November 17, 2013	N/A
23	16	Ricky Schroder, Rudy Giuliani and Dramatic Weight Loss Stories	November 24, 2013	N/A
24	17	Pat Benatar, Actor Christopher Atkins and Dustin Diamond's Biggest Regrets	December 1, 2013	N/A
25	18	Snooki, 80's Heartthrob Willie Aames and Lottery Winners	December 8, 2013	N/A
26	19	Dallas Star Linda Gray, Melissa Joan Hart and Former Prosecutor Marcia Clark	December 15, 2013	N/A
27	20	90210's Ian Ziering, Ivana Trump, and Project Runway Winner Christian Siriano	December 22, 2013	N/A

=== Season 3 (2014) ===
No. overall	No. in season	Title	Original release date
28	1	Kristin Chenoweth, Queer Eye's Cast Reunion and Gary Busey	January 3, 2014
29	2	Ralph Macchio, Tia and Tamera Mowry, Kenny Loggins, and Peter Scolari	January 10, 2014
30	3	Debbie Allen, Lisa Whelchel and Mindy Cohn from Facts of Life, and William Shatner	January 17, 2014
31	4	Sinéad O'Connor, Corbin Bleu, Lou Ferrigno and Margaret Cho	January 24, 2014
32	5	Marie Osmond, Brian Boitano, Susan Lucci and Supermodel Emme	January 31, 2014
33	6	Rick Springfield, Jill Zarin, Terry Fator and the Village People	February 7, 2014
34	7	Lisa Marie Presley, Jane Seymour and Adam Ant	February 14, 2014
35	8	Brooke Burke Charvet, Robby Benson and Jackée Harry	February 21, 2014

=== Season 4 (2014) ===
No. overall	No. in season	Title	Original release date
36	1	Love Boat Reunion, Charo, Dave Coulier, DB Sweeney and OMG Makeovers!	June 8, 2014
37	2	Candy Spelling, Knots Landing Reunion	June 15, 2014
38	3	La Toya Jackson, Olympian Scott Hamilton, Kim Goldman	June 22, 2014
39	4	Darva Conger, Brigitte Nielsen & Original Dreamgirl Sheryl Lee Ralph	June 29, 2014
40	5	Geraldo, Scott Wolf, Elvira, Terry McMillan, & the Shark Attack Survivor	July 6, 2014
41	6	Mel B, Yanni & an Update on the Wife Who Left Her Husband for a Woman	July 13, 2014
42	7	Jaclyn Smith, Sheila E. & Louie Anderson	July 20, 2014
43	8	Nicole Richie, Fran Drescher & Tom Green	July 27, 2014
44	9	Singer Brandy, Supermodel Niki Taylor, Kiss Rocker Paul Stanley and Lorenzo Lamas	August 3, 2014
45	10	Randy Jackson, Sam Champion and Danielle Staub	August 10, 2014
46	11	Jermaine Jackson, George Takei, Ali Landry, Former Teen Idol Rex Smith and Jayson Blair	August 17, 2014
47	12	Pat O'Brien, Janice from Friends, Jack Wagner & a Tribute to Robin Williams	August 24, 2014

=== Season 5 (2014-15) ===
No. overall	No. in season	Title	Original release date
48	1	Child star Raven-Symoné, singer Jackie Evancho, "Blossom" actress Jenna von Oÿ, soap star Maurice Benard	October 5, 2014
49	2	Actress Vivica A. Fox, Janine Turner, Jimmy McNichol, Peter Ostrum	October 12, 2014
50	3	Charice's Surprising Revelation, Carmen Electra, Macy Gray & Shadoe Stevens	October 19, 2014
51	4	"A Different World" Cast Reunion, Soap Star Finola Hughes, Kiss' Paul Stanley	October 26, 2014
52	5	Melissa Gilbert, Deidre Hall & Star Search Champ Sam Harris	November 2, 2014
53	6	George Hamilton, Morgan Fairchild, Micky Dolenz & Randy Spelling	November 9, 2014
54	7	Whitney Houston's Sister-in-Law Pat Houston & Model Niki Taylor	November 16, 2014
55	8	Meredith Baxter, Rapper T.I. & Downtown Julie Brown	November 23, 2014
56	9	Bo Derek, Robin Leach, Eric Roberts & the McCaughey Septuplets Turn 17	November 30, 2014
57	10	Holiday Special with Kris Jenner, Kenny G, Kristin Cavallari & Fave Things	December 7, 2014
58	11	Beth Holloway, Original Cast of MTV's Real World Reunion & Popstar Tiffany	December 21, 2014
59	12	Civil Rights Special	January 1, 2015

=== Season 6 (2015) ===
No. overall	No. in season	Title	Original release date	U.S. viewers (millions)
60	1	Matthew Shepard's Parents, Leeza Gibbons & The Browns from "Sister Wives"	March 8, 2015	0.37
61	2	Brittany Maynard's husband, Baywatch Stars & KC & the Sunshine Band	March 15, 2015	N/A
62	3	A Former Oprah Show Guest's Shocking Discovery & Stunning Change of Heart	March 22, 2015	0.36
63	4	Betty White, Belinda Carlisle, Tawny Kitaen and John Edward	March 29, 2015	N/A
64	5	Charles Spencer, Twisted Sister's Dee Snider & "Erin" from The Waltons	April 5, 2015	N/A
65	6	Ricki Lake, DL Hughley, Garcelle Beauvais & Brutus the Grizzly Bear	April 25, 2015	0.50
66	7	Oprah talks to Andrea Yates' Husband, Actress Angie Harmon & Apollonia	April 25, 2015	0.44
67	8	"Happy Days" stars, Janice Dickinson & the World's First Openly Gay Prince	May 9, 2015	0.28
68	9	The Unabomber's Brother, Leah Remini, Darryl Strawberry on Life After MLB	May 16, 2015	0.39
69	10	Chef Curtis Stone; 90s Singer Lisa Loeb; Reality Star Taylor Armstrong	May 23, 2015	N/A

=== Season 7 (2015-16) ===
No. overall	No. in season	Title	Original release date	U.S. viewers (millions)
70	1	Oprah Reunites with Actor David Oyelowo; Actress Debi Mazar and "Real Housewife" Lisa Rinna	September 19, 2015	0.49
71	2	"Who's the Boss?" Child Star Danny Pintauro Reveals a Big Secret, Former Playmate Holly Madison and Funnyman Tommy Davidson	September 26, 2015	0.57
72	3	The Mom Who Nearly Shopped Her Family Broke, Debbi Morgan, GMA's Amy Robach	October 3, 2015	0.78
73	4	Hip Hop Mogul Master P, Amy Grant, Coach Mike Ditka & Oprah's Hairstylist	October 10, 2015	0.66
74	5	Belief Special	October 17, 2015	0.48
75	6	Nate Berkus & Jeremiah Brent, Dick Van Dyke, Dorothy Hamill, Lisa Leslie	January 23, 2016	0.40
76	7	Transgender Teen Jazz Jennings, Stars of Growing Pains, Robert Guillaume	January 30, 2016	0.36
77	8	Chaz Bono, Sugar Ray Leonard, Linda Blair, Star Trek's Nichelle Nichols	February 6, 2016	0.43
78	9	Joan Lunden, Bindi Irwin, Kid 'n Play, The Biggest Loser's Bob Harper	February 13, 2016	0.33
79	10	Rocker Scott Stapp, Heather Mills, Telma Hopkins, Brandi Chastain	February 20, 2016	N/A
80	11	Laila Ali, General Hospital's Kristina Wagner, The Bachelor's Chris Soules	March 5, 2016	0.36
81	12	The Peetes, Ali Wentworth, Penn & Teller, Bernie Mac's Widow	March 12, 2016	0.35
82	13	Naomi Judd, Carla Hall & 90's Pop Star Gerardo	March 19, 2016	0.45
83	14	O. J. Simpson Special	April 2, 2016	0.39
84	15	Mackenzie Phillips, Broadway and TV Star Audra McDonald & Jose Canseco	April 9, 2016	0.28
85	16	General Hospital's Genie Francis, Supermodel Iman, Child Prodigy Greg Smith	April 16, 2016	0.41
86	17	Icon Diahann Carroll, Candy Queen Dylan Lauren, Actress Lela Rochon	April 23, 2016	0.38
87	18	Honey Boo Boo and family, Brian McKnight, Laura San Giacomo	April 30, 2016	0.45

=== Season 8 (2016) ===
No. overall	No. in season	Title	Original release date	U.S. viewers (millions)
88	1	Sir Mix-a-Lot, Heartthrob Kevin Jonas & "I Dream of Jeannie's" Barbara Eden	August 13, 2016	0.25
89	2	Rock Icon Sammy Hagar, Olympian Suzy Favor Hamilton & Rain Pryor	August 20, 2016	0.33
90	3	Spice Girl Geri Horner, Vee Jay Ed Lover & "Family Affair" Star Kathy Garver	August 27, 2016	0.31
91	4	R&B Legends Boyz II Men, The Jeffersons' Marla Gibbs & Soup Nazi	September 10, 2016	0.48
92	5	R&B Divas En Vogue, Gilligan's Island's Dawn Wells, Supermodel Angie Everhart	September 17, 2016	0.45
93	6	Legendary Rocker Eddie Money, Charlie's Angels' Cheryl Ladd & Old Spice Guy	September 24, 2016	0.32
94	7	Rappers Naughty by Nature, Wendy from Snapple & "Austin Powers'" Verne Troyer	October 1, 2016	0.32
95	8	Biggest Loser Ali Vincent, 80s Pop Star Samantha Fox, & "Smart Guy's" Tahj Mowry	October 8, 2016	0.41
96	9	Music Legend Kenny Rogers, B52s' Kate Pierson, Original "Roots" Star Ben Vereen	October 15, 2016	0.29
97	10	Former Teen Star Aaron Carter, Comic Jim J. Bullock, Soap Star Victoria Rowell	October 22, 2016	0.49
98	11	Former Teen Pop Star Debbie Gibson, Jennifer Holliday & Sally Jessy Raphael	October 29, 2016	0.46
99	12	Sopranos' Jamie-Lynn Sigler, Facts of Life Actress Kim Fields, Chef Rocco DiSpirito	November 5, 2016	0.45
100	13	Money Expert Suze Orman, Ferris Bueller's Alan Ruck & Musician Kevin Eubanks	November 12, 2016	0.41
101	14	R&B Artist Sisqó, Billy Ray Cyrus, What's Happening's Danielle Spencer	November 19, 2016	0.63
102	15	Singer Monica, Ziggy Marley, Actress Lisa Nicole Carson, Veronica Webb	November 26, 2016	0.58
103	16	Rapper Chuck D, Dancer Cheryl Burke, Gospel Great Shirley Caesar	December 3, 2016	0.45
104	17	Meat Loaf, 1st Lady of Hip Hop MC Lyte, Rapper Bizzy Bone	December 10, 2016	0.40
105	18	New Edition's Johnny Gill, Malcolm-Jamal Warner, Skater Tai Babilonia	December 17, 2016	0.42

=== Season 9 (2017) ===
No. overall	No. in season	Title	Original release date	U.S. viewers (millions)
106	1	Actress Phylicia Rashad, YouTube Star Lindsey Stirling, Singer Jon Secada	January 28, 2017	N/A
107	2	R & B Group Bell Biv Devoe, Paralympian Amy Purdy, Country Star Ty Herndon	February 4, 2017	0.49
108	3	Former Disco Singer Gloria Gaynor, Roots’ John Amos, & Montell Jordan	February 11, 2017	N/A

== Awards and nominations ==
Year	Award	Category	Result
2014	NAACP Image Award	Outstanding News/Information — Series or Special	Nominated
2016	NAACP Image Award	Outstanding News/Information — Series or Special ("Civil Rights Special")	Nominated
