= BET Tonight =

- Genre: Talk show
- Starring: Tavis Smiley; Ed Gordon
- Country of origin: United States
- Original language: English
- No. of seasons: 5

Production
- Production company: Black Entertainment Television

Original release
- Network: Black Entertainment Television
- Release: 1998 – 2002

BET Tonight is an American talk show hosted by Tavis Smiley originally from (1998–2001), and subsequently Ed Gordon. It aired on the BET network.

== Awards ==
Award	Category	Result
30th NAACP Image Awards	Outstanding News, Talk or Information – Series	Won
31st NAACP Image Awards	Outstanding News, Talk or Information – Series	Won
32nd NAACP Image Awards	Outstanding News, Talk or Information – Series	Won
32nd NAACP Image Awards	Outstanding News, Talk or Information – Special	Won
33rd NAACP Image Awards	Outstanding News, Talk or Information – Series	Nominated
34th NAACP Image Awards	Outstanding News, Talk or Information – Series or Special	Won
