= Media works of Oprah Winfrey =

This article documents the professional media works of Oprah Winfrey.

== As actress ==
=== Film ===
Year	Title	Role	Notes
1985	The Color Purple	Sofia	Nominated – Academy Award for Best Actress in a Supporting Role; Nominated – Golden Globe Award for Best Supporting Actress – Motion Picture; Nominated – Los Angeles Film Critics Association Award for Best Supporting Actress
1986	Native Son	Mrs. Thomas	
1998	Beloved	Sethe	Also producer Nominated – NAACP Image Award for Outstanding Actress in a Motion Picture
1999	Our Friend, Martin	Coretta Scott King	Voice role; Direct-to-video film
2006	Charlotte's Web	Gussy the Goose	Voice role
2007	Bee Movie	Judge Bumbleton	Voice role
2009	The Princess and the Frog	Eudora	Voice role
2013	The Butler	Gloria Gaines	African-American Film Critics Association Award for Best Supporting Actress; Santa Barbara International Film Festival — Montecito Award; Nominated – BAFTA Award for Best Actress in a Supporting Role; Nominated – Black Reel Award for Best Supporting Actress; Nominated – Broadcast Film Critics Association Award for Best Supporting Actress; Nominated – Denver Film Critics Society Award for Best Supporting Actress; Nominated – NAACP Image Award for Outstanding Supporting Actress in a Motion Picture; Nominated – Phoenix Film Critics Society Award for Best Supporting Actress; Nominated – Satellite Award for Best Supporting Actress – Motion Picture; Nominated – Screen Actors Guild Award for Outstanding Performance by a Female Actor in a Supporting Role; Nominated – Screen Actors Guild Award for Outstanding Performance by a Cast in a Motion Picture
2014	Selma	Annie Lee Cooper	Also producer Women Film Critics Circle Award for Best Female Action Star; Nominated – Academy Award for Best Picture; Nominated – Independent Spirit Award for Best Film; Nominated – NAACP Image Award for Outstanding Supporting Actress in a Motion Picture
2017	The Star	Deborah the Camel	Voice role
2018	A Wrinkle in Time	Mrs. Which	
2018	Crow: The Legend	The One Who Creates Everything by Thinking	Voice role; short film
2024	The Six Triple Eight	Mary McLeod Bethune	

=== Television ===
Year	Title	Role	Notes
1989	The Women of Brewster Place	Mattie Michael	TV miniseries
1990	Brewster Place	Mattie Michael	11 episodes
1992	Lincoln	Elizabeth Keckley	Voice role; TV movie (ABC)
1992	There Are No Children Here	LaJoe Rivers	TV movie (ABC)
1997	Ellen	Therapist	Episode: "The Puppy Episode"
1997	Before Women Had Wings	Zora Williams	TV movie (ABC)
2010	Sesame Street	O	Voice role; episode: "The Camouflage Challenge"
2016–17	Greenleaf	Mavis McCready	11 episodes; also executive producer
2017	The Immortal Life of Henrietta Lacks	Deborah Lacks	TV movie; also executive producer Nominated – NAACP Image Award for Outstanding Actress in a Television Movie, Mini-Series or Dramatic Special; Nominated – Primetime Emmy Award for Outstanding Television Movie
2018–19	The Handmaid's Tale	Radio Free America Announcer	Voice role; 2 episodes

== As herself ==
Year	Title	Role	Notes
1986	Saturday Night Live	Herself (host)	Episode: "Oprah Winfrey/Joe Jackson"
1986–2011	The Oprah Winfrey Show	Herself	Television talk show
1987	Throw Momma from the Train	Herself	Film
1990	Gabriel's Fire	Herself	Episode: "Tis the Season"
1992	The Fresh Prince of Bel-Air	Herself	Episode: "A Night at the Oprah"
1995	All-American Girl	Herself	Episode: "A Night at the Oprah"
1999	Home Improvement	Herself	Episode: "Home Alone"
1999	The Hughleys	Herself	Episode: "Milsap Moves Up"
2005	Desperate Housewives: Oprah Winfrey Is the New Neighbor	Herself, Karen Stouffer	Segment for The Oprah Winfrey Show, aired February 3, 2005
2007	Ocean's Thirteen	Herself	Film
2008	30 Rock	Herself/Pam	Episode: "Believe in the Stars"
2011–18	Oprah's Master Class	Herself	OWN reality show
2011–14	Oprah's Lifeclass	Herself	OWN self-help show
2011–21	Super Soul Sunday	Herself	OWN spirituality show
2012–15	Oprah Prime	Herself	OWN interview show
2012–17	Oprah: Where Are They Now?	Herself	OWN reality show
2019	A Beautiful Day in the Neighborhood	Herself	Film; archive footage
2019–21	Oprah's Book Club	Herself	Apple TV+ book club show
2020	Oprah Talks COVID-19	Herself	Apple TV+ interview show
2020–21	The Oprah Conversation	Herself	Apple TV+ talk show
2020	Between the World and Me	Herself	HBO special - adaptation of the book
2021	Tina	Herself	Documentary
2021	Oprah with Meghan and Harry	Herself	CBS primetime special
2021	The Me You Can't See	Herself	Apple TV+ docuseries
2021	Adele One Night Only	Herself	CBS primetime special
2026	Mary Oliver: Saved by the Beauty of the World	Herself	Documentary

== Radio ==
Year	Title	Role
2006	Oprah & Friends	Herself

== As producer only ==
- 1989 – The Oprah Winfrey Show (supervising producer – 8 episodes, 1989–2011)
- 1989 – The Women of Brewster Place (TV miniseries) (executive producer)
- 1992 – Nine (TV documentary) (executive producer)
- 1992 – Overexposed (TV movie) (executive producer)
- 1993 – ABC Afterschool Special (TV series) (producer – 1 episode "Shades of a Single Protein") (producer)
- 1993 – Michael Jackson Talks to... Oprah Live (TV special) (executive producer)
- 1997 – Before Women Had Wings (TV movie) (producer)
- 1998 – The Wedding (TV miniseries) (executive producer)
- 1998 – Beloved (producer)
- 1998 – David and Lisa (TV movie) (executive producer)
- 1999 – Tuesdays with Morrie (TV movie) (executive producer)
- 2001 – Amy & Isabelle (TV movie) (executive producer, producer)
- 2002 – Oprah After the Show (TV series) (executive producer)
- 2005 – Their Eyes Were Watching God (TV movie) (executive producer)
- 2006 – Legends Ball (TV documentary) (executive producer)
- 2007 – Oprah's Big Give (TV series) (executive producer)
- 2007 – The Oprah Winfrey Oscar Special (TV movie) (executive producer)
- 2007 – Building a Dream: The Oprah Winfrey Leadership Academy (TV documentary) (executive producer)
- 2007 – Oprah Winfrey Presents: Mitch Albom's For One More Day (TV movie) (executive producer)
- 2007 – The Great Debaters (producer)
- 2009 – The Dr. Oz Show (TV series) (executive producer)
- 2009 – Precious (executive producer)
- 2009 – Christmas at the White House: An Oprah Primetime Special (TV special) (executive producer)
- 2010 – The Oprah Winfrey Oscar Special (TV movie) (executive producer)
- 2011 – Your OWN Show (TV series) (executive producer)
- 2011 – Extraordinary Mom (TV documentary) (executive producer)
- 2011 – Serving Life (TV documentary) (executive producer)
- 2014 – The Hundred-Foot Journey (producer)
- 2014 – Selma (producer)
- 2016–2022 – Queen Sugar (co-creator and executive producer)
- 2016–2020 – Greenleaf (executive producer)
- 2017 – The Immortal Life of Henrietta Lacks (TV movie) (executive producer)
- 2018 – Love Is (executive producer)
- 2019 – When They See Us (executive producer)
- 2019 – Oprah Winfrey Presents: After Neverland (executive producer)
- 2019 – David Makes Man (executive producer)
- 2020 – The Water Man (executive producer)
- 2022 – Sidney (documentary film) (producer)
- 2023 – The Color Purple (producer)

== Bibliography ==
- Winfrey, Oprah (1996). The Uncommon Wisdom of Oprah Winfrey: A Portrait in Her Own Words
- Winfrey, Oprah (1998). Journey to Beloved (Photography by Ken Regan)
- Winfrey, Oprah (1998). Make the Connection: Ten Steps to a Better Body and a Better Life (co-authored with Bob Greene)
- Winfrey, Oprah (2000). Oprah Winfrey: The Soul and Spirit of a Superstar
- Winfrey, Oprah (2014). What I Know for Sure
- Winfrey, Oprah (2016). Mr. or Ms. Just Right (co-authored with B. Grace)
- Winfrey, Oprah (2017). Food, Health and Happiness
- Winfrey, Oprah (2017). The Wisdom of Sundays: Life-Changing Insights from Super Soul Conversations
  - Winfrey, Oprah (2017). The Wisdom Journal: The Companion to The Wisdom of Sundays
- Winfrey, Oprah (2019). The Path Made Clear: Discovering Your Life's Direction and Purpose
- Winfrey, Oprah (2021). What Happened to You?: Conversations on Trauma, Resilience, and Healing (co-authored with B. Perry)
