= Oprah Winfrey's endorsement of Barack Obama =

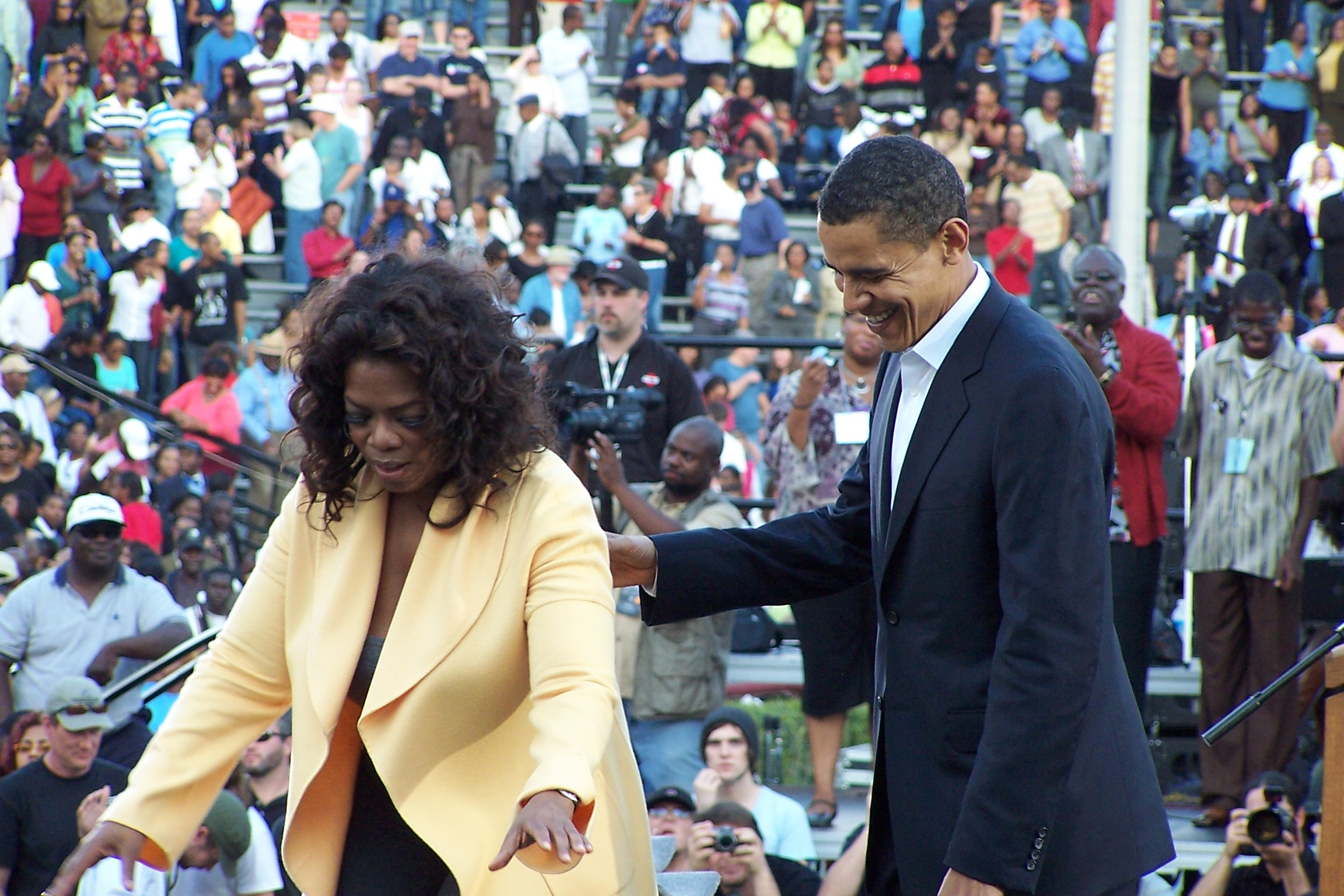
Winfrey and Senator Obama at Williams–Brice Stadium in Columbia, SC (December 9, 2007)

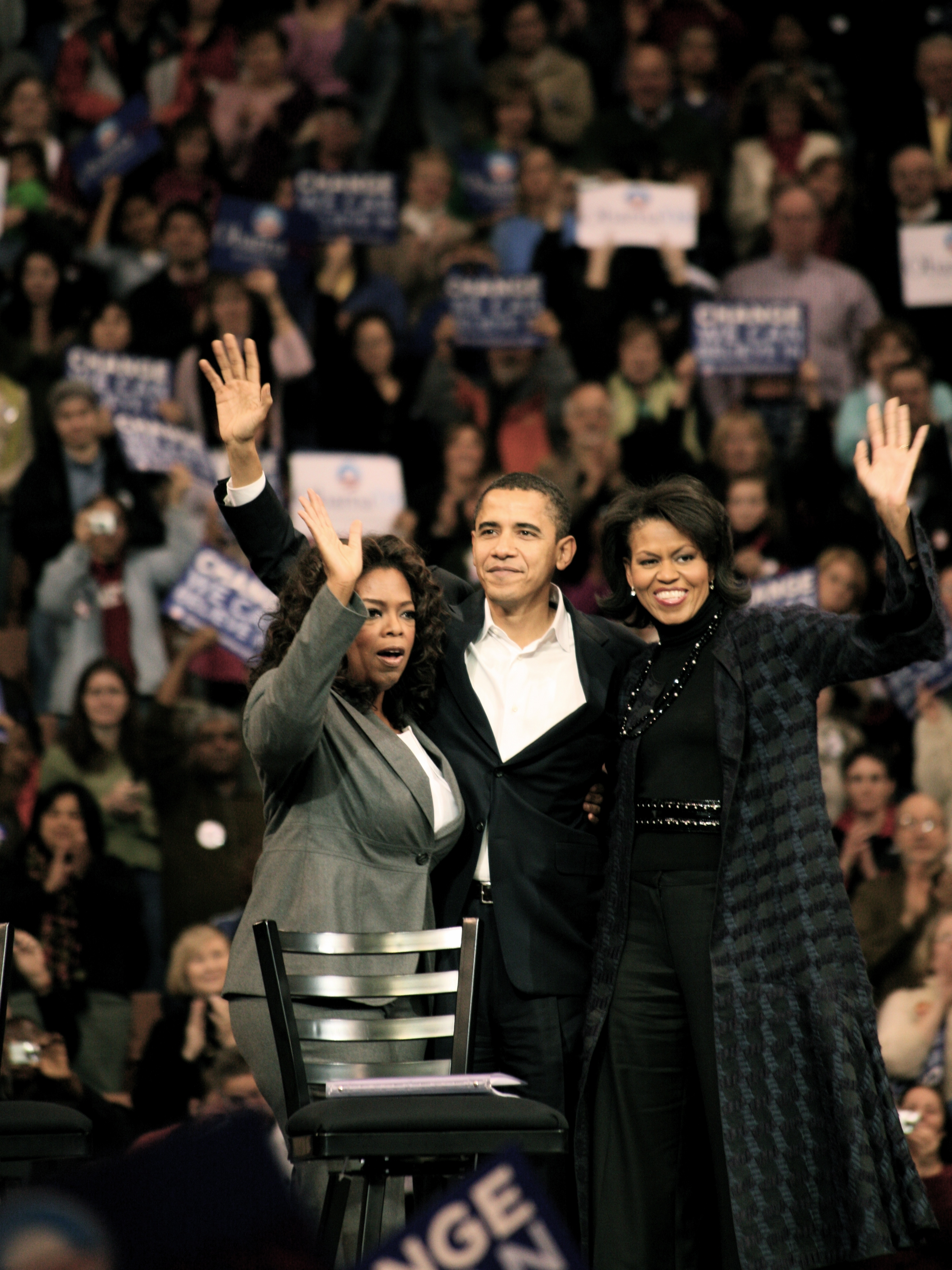
Winfrey joins Senator Barack Obama and Michelle Obama on the campaign trail (December 10, 2007).

Oprah Winfrey's endorsement of Barack Obama was one of the most widely covered and studied developments of the 2008 presidential campaign, as she has been described as the most influential woman in the world. Winfrey first endorsed Obama in September 2006 before he had even declared himself a presidential candidate. In May 2007, Winfrey made her official endorsement of candidate Obama, and in December 2007, she made her first campaign appearances for him. Two economists estimate that Winfrey's endorsement was worth over a million votes in the Democratic primary race and that without it, Obama would have received fewer votes. Then-governor of Illinois Rod Blagojevich claimed that the endorsement was so significant in making Obama president-elect that he considered offering Obama's former seat in the Senate to Winfrey.

== Winfrey's endorsement influence ==
Winfrey was at times called "arguably the world's most powerful woman" by CNN and Time.com, "arguably the most influential woman in the world" by The American Spectator, "one of the 100 people who most influenced the 20th century" and "one of the most influential people" of 2004, 2005, 2006, 2007, 2008, 2009, 2010 and 2011 by Time. Winfrey is the only person in the world to have made all nine lists.

At the end of the 20th century Life listed Winfrey as both the most influential woman and the most influential black person of her generation, and in a cover story profile the magazine called her "America's most powerful woman". Ladies Home Journal also ranked Winfrey number one in their list of the most powerful women in America and then senator Barack Obama has said she "may be the most influential woman in the country". In 1998 Winfrey became the first woman and first African American to top Entertainment Weekly's list of the 101 most powerful people in the entertainment industry. In 2003 Winfrey edged out both Superman and Elvis Presley to be named the greatest pop culture icon of all time by VH1. Forbes named her the world's most powerful celebrity in 2005, 2007, and 2008. Columnist Maureen Dowd seems to agree with such assessments:

She is the top alpha female in this country. She has more credibility than the president. Other successful women, such as Hillary Clinton and Martha Stewart, had to be publicly slapped down before they could move forward. Even Condi has had to play the protégé with Bush. None of this happened to Oprah – she is a straight ahead success story.

Vanity Fair wrote:

Oprah Winfrey arguably has more influence on the culture than any university president, politician, or religious leader, except perhaps the Pope.

Bill O'Reilly said:

I mean this is a woman that came from nothing to rise up to be the most powerful woman, I think, in the world. I think Oprah Winfrey is the most powerful woman in the world, not just in America. That's – anybody who goes on her program immediately benefits through the roof. I mean, she has a loyal following; she has credibility; she has talent; and she's done it on her own to become fabulously wealthy and fabulously powerful.

Biographer Kitty Kelley states that she has always been "fascinated" by Winfrey:

As a woman, she has wielded an unprecedented amount of influence over the American culture and psyche,...There has been no other person in the 20th century whose convictions and values have impacted the American public in such a significant way.... I see her as probably the most powerful woman in our society.

The power of Winfrey's endorsement has been most consistently measured by the spike in sales that products receive when she endorses them on her show, most notably, books selected for Oprah's Book Club.

Business Week stated:

Perhaps the most astonishing aspect of the Oprah phenomenon is how outsized her power is compared with that of other market movers. Some observers suggest that Jon Stewart of Comedy Central's The Daily Show could be No. 2. Other proven arm-twisters include Fox News's Sean Hannity, National Public Radio's Terry Gross, radio personality Don Imus, and CBS' 60 Minutes. But no one comes close to Oprah's clout: Publishers estimate that her power to sell a book is anywhere from 20 to 100 times that of any other media personality.

The influence of Winfrey's endorsement is also credited with making Dr. Phil, who got his start appearing on Winfrey's show, into a household name and talk show host

== Endorsing Barack Obama ==
On September 25, 2006, Winfrey appeared on Larry King Live and was asked about a fan who started a campaign to get Winfrey to run for president. Larry King noted that Winfrey's lawyers had apparently warned the man to stop the campaign. Winfrey chided the lawyers and advised the fan to "take all your energy, and put it in Barack Obama". Winfrey explained that Obama was her favorite senator and she hoped he would run for president. Then, on October 19, 2006, Winfrey interviewed Obama and his wife Michelle on her show and reiterated the endorsement that she had previously made on Larry King, while promoting his book The Audacity of Hope. Winfrey explained that she would be on the air for several more years, so if he ever decided to run, she would hope he would announce it on her show. Obama's appearance on Oprah caused his book to reach the No. 1 spot on both Amazon.com's and the New York Times' bestseller list. Immediately following Winfrey's two endorsements, Time magazine put Obama on their October 23, 2006 cover with the caption "Why Barack Obama could be the next president."

On February 10, 2007, Obama eventually decided to announce his candidacy, not on The Oprah Winfrey Show, but at the steps of the Illinois state legislature. With Obama officially becoming a candidate for president in 2008, Winfrey decided not to interview him or any other candidate during the campaign because as a vocal Obama supporter, she noted that she may be unable to be objective.

In May 2007, Winfrey once again appeared on Larry King Live and was asked if her endorsement of Obama still applied. She replied "of course" and explained that what Obama stood for was worth her going out on a limb for. When King asked Winfrey if there was a woman side of her that would lean towards Obama's opponent, then front-runner Hillary Clinton, Winfrey explained that she had great respect for Senator Clinton, and that her endorsement of Obama did not imply that she was against anyone else. After endorsing Obama, however, Oprah's ratings fell 7%.

In June 2008, when Obama secured the Democratic nomination, Winfrey told Entertainment Tonight:

I'm euphoric, I've been doing the happy dance all day. I'm so proud of Barack and [his wife] Michelle Obama and what this means for all of us ... the new possibilities for our country. And if he wants me to, I'm ready to go door to door.

In late August 2008, Winfrey attended the Democratic convention and reacted emotionally to Obama's speech, telling reporters "I've never experienced anything like that. I cried my eyelashes off." Elaborating further, Winfrey explained "I woke up this morning and I went to Google and I googled the entire Martin Luther King speech because like most Americans I, you know, you listen to the 'I Have a Dream' part. In the earlier part of the speech, he talks about the promise of democracy. And I think that today that promise was fulfilled in a way that I never imagined in my lifetime." Winfrey also told reporters:

And what I saw with Barack Obama was something that was transcendent and I felt transformational for me as a human being and for this country. And I only pray in the deepest part of my being that America will rise to this moment. And I feel that what he was able to offer us as individual citizens and as a united country was something that we have never seen before. I really, I think it's the most powerful thing I've ever experienced. I often wondered what it would be like to sit and listen to Lincoln speak or Roosevelt speak or what it would have been like to have been old enough to understand what Martin Luther King was saying 45 years ago today. And what he did brought that home in a way that I could never have imagined.

== Fundraising ==
In the fall of 2007 Winfrey held a fundraiser for Obama at her California home and raised several million dollars. In October 2008 Winfrey hosted a second fundraiser for Obama, this time in Chicago.

== Campaign appearances ==
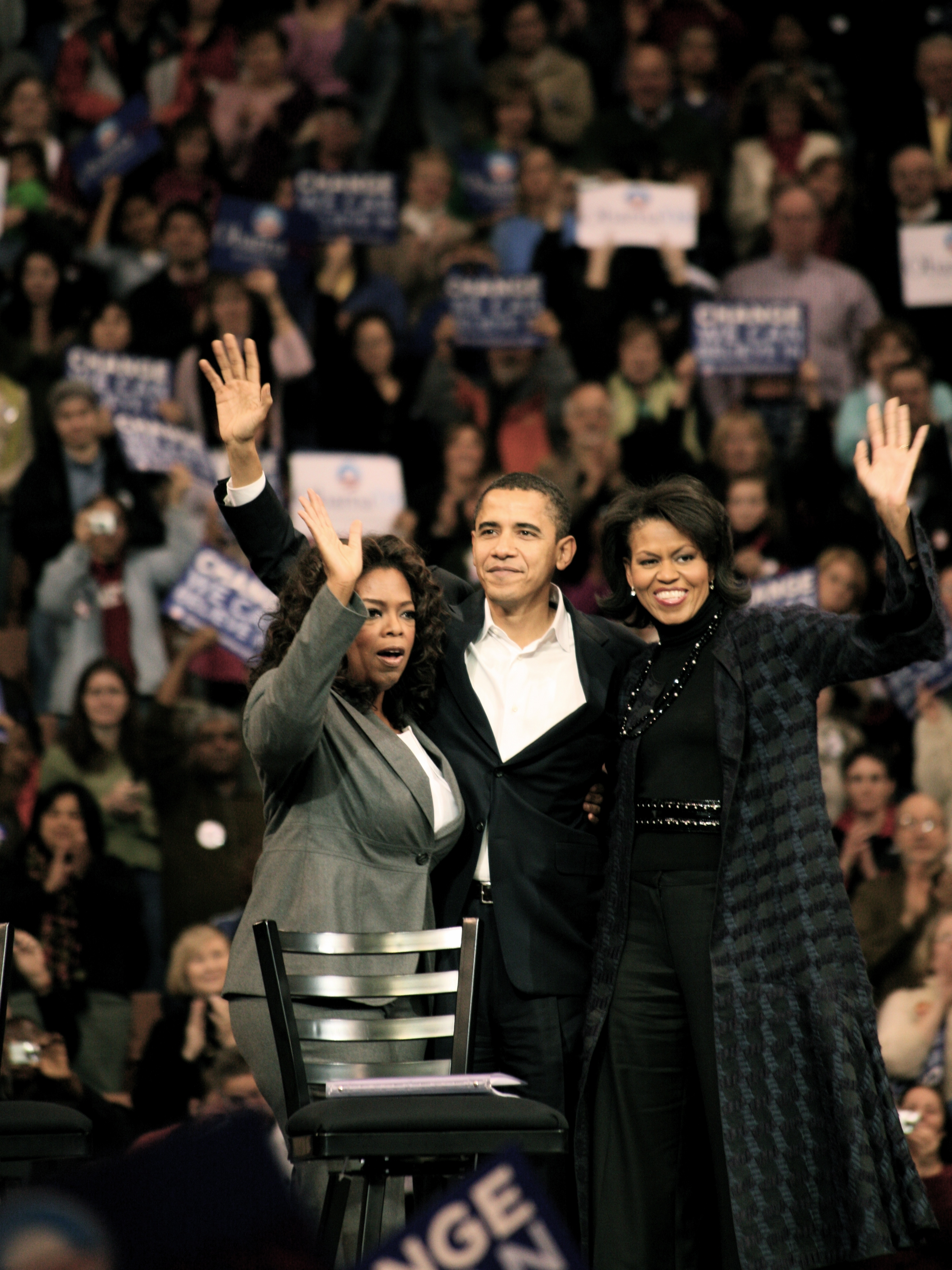
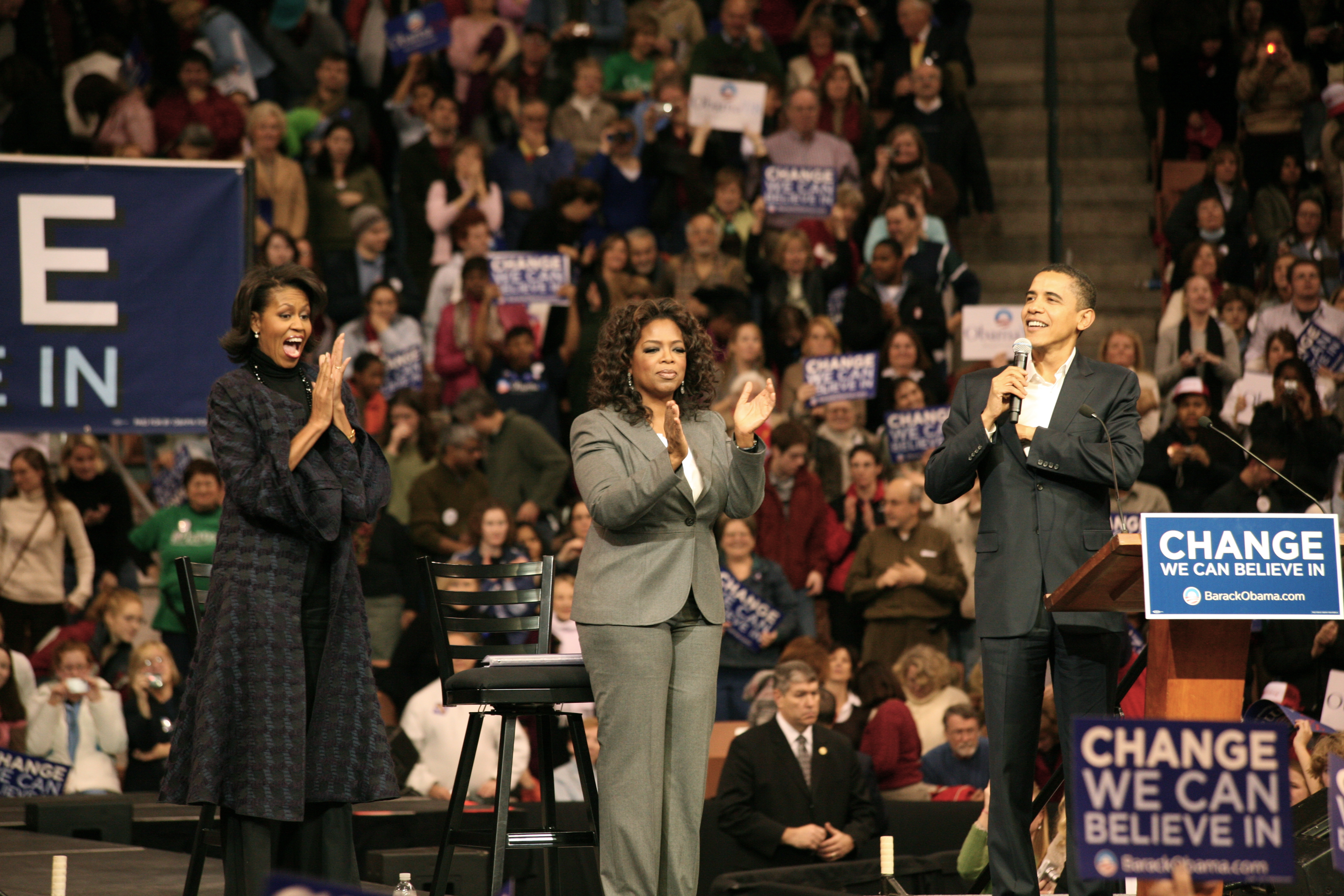
Oprah Winfrey joins Barack and Michelle Obama on the campaign trail (December 10, 2007).

In the fall of 2007, Obama was considered a long shot, an absolute outsider in the race for the Democratic Party nomination for president of the United States and was still considered unlikely to win the Iowa caucus, and polls showed him losing the black vote to Clinton. In late November 2007, the Obama campaign announced that Winfrey would be campaigning for Obama for a series of rallies in the early primary states of Iowa, New Hampshire, and South Carolina. Even before Winfrey appeared thousands of Iowans flocked to Obama's campaign offices, and 1,385 signed up as volunteers to score tickets to see Winfrey's Iowa appearance. The Columbia, South Carolina event on December 9, 2007, drew a crowd of nearly 30,000, the largest for any political event of 2007.

Newsweek's Howard Fineman reviewed Winfrey's speech in South Carolina:

Oprah riffed her way through an eloquent paean to the need for a change of leadership in America. "Dr. King talked about the dream," she said. "Now we get to vote that dream into reality. You gotta step out of your box!" she said. "We can dream America anew!"...She is astonishing, truly. The woman was on her maiden campaign trail voyage, and yet already she was better—more cogent, more effective, more convincing—than anyone out there.

== Impact ==
=== More than one million votes ===
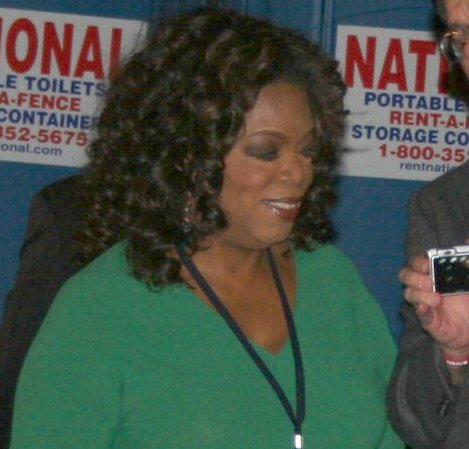
Winfrey attending Obama's election night rally at Grant Park

Using a novel methodology, Craig Garthwaite and Tim Moore, economists at the University of Maryland, College Park concluded that Winfrey's endorsement of Obama not only netted him 1,015,559 votes in the Democratic primary alone (with a 95% confidence interval of 423,123 to 1,596,995) but decided the election. The researchers were not able to apply their methodology to all states however, so their estimate does not include any additional Oprah effect that may have emerged in Texas, Michigan, North Dakota, Kansas, or Alaska. "It was the decisive, if not the deciding factor for the primary results," explained Garthwaite.

Garthwaite and Moore matched sales of Winfrey's "O" magazine and the spike in sales of her book club picks to Obama's votes in the Democratic primary. After controlling for a large range of confounding factors such as the fact that both Obama and Winfrey are popular with African Americans, Garthwaite and Moore showed that votes for Obama spiked in precisely the same geographic areas where Winfrey is the most popular. By applying the same methodology to Obama's 2004 Senate race, when he did not have Winfrey's endorsement, they found no relationship between Obama votes and Winfrey popularity in Illinois; the relationship only emerged after the endorsement, suggesting that Winfrey's endorsement had caused the spike in Obama's vote total in those counties.

Garthwaite and Moore also showed that the connection is not because people who read women's magazines preferred Obama to Clinton. Just the opposite, Obama got less support where women's magazines such as Self and People are popular. After controlling for racial demographics, the economists also found no relationship between the popularity of Ebony magazine, whose readership is largely African American, and support for Obama.

In addition to getting Obama over a million votes, the researchers found that Winfrey's support boosted campaign contributions to him in those counties where she is most popular. They found that Winfrey's biggest effect was in caucus states like Iowa.

During the Democratic primary, there was controversy over which states should be counted in the popular vote total and not all states released official vote counts. Clinton, however, won the popular vote by 176,645 votes when Michigan's numbers were included.

=== Increased viability ===
Another study suggests that Winfrey's endorsement may have also had indirect benefits for Obama. Researchers Andrew Pease and Paul R. Brewer of the University of Wisconsin–Milwaukee conducted an experiment in which some subjects were exposed to news of Winfrey's endorsement and others weren't. They found that those who had such exposure were more likely to vote for Obama, if only because they thought her endorsement made Obama more electable; for such voters Winfrey's endorsement was important for strategic reasons. The researchers concluded that when evaluating the impact of celebrity endorsements, one must also consider "subtler effects, such as those on viability assessments."

=== Polls ===
A CBS poll found that a third of all Americans claimed that most people they know would be more inclined to vote for Obama because of Winfrey's endorsement. A study by the Pew Research Center found that Winfrey's campaign appearances had dramatically increased Obama's visibility, especially among African-Americans. One reason Winfrey's endorsement was useful in helping Obama compete with Senator Clinton was because as of December 2007 (when Winfrey first began campaigning) Winfrey was the one woman in the world more admired than Hillary Clinton among American women.

=== Political commentary ===
"There's no doubt that Oprah could tip a close presidential election if she strongly backed one candidate," predicted psychologist James Houran. In the May 2007 issue of Newsmax, political analyst Dick Morris predicted Winfrey's endorsement would have an important impact:

Oprah's endorsement is particularly important as a black woman, since she will provide millions of African-American women with guidance on their personal decision about whether to back the first of their gender or the first of their race. But as a statement to all women, a decision by Oprah to endorse Obama would be a huge rejection of Hillary Clinton. While she will likely play such an endorsement as reflecting more of a love for Obama than any dislike for Hillary, women voters are sure to draw the conclusion that there is something flawed in Hillary that made Oprah turn away from her candidacy. I think Oprah's support will not only be important, it will be more important than any other political endorsement this year.

When asked by Larry King if there was a "woman side" of Oprah that "would lean towards a Hillary" Winfrey replied:

Well, I have great respect for Hillary Clinton. I – I think I've said this before and it's true. Because I am for Barack does not mean I am against Hillary or anybody else. So the fact that I would endorse Barack Obama and the fact that I would support Barack Obama, I have not one negative thing to say about Hillary Clinton.

"Because Oprah has such a reputation as a tastemaker, I think her early endorsement forced people to take Obama's candidacy seriously," explained Dr. Mark Anthony Neal, author, pop culture critic and Duke University professor. "It made Obama more than a 'Black' candidate. Also, given Oprah's championing of women's issues, her decision not to support Hillary (Clinton) struck a chord for early undecideds... Obama's people understood that much of the Black electorate in the South was made up of women, and Oprah's campaigning with the Obamas, particularly in South Carolina, helped give the campaign some momentum"

In April 2008, The New York Times editorial board wrote:

If Barack Obama is elected president, a good chunk of credit should go to Oprah Winfrey. Her early and enthusiastic endorsement of Senator Obama – and her heavily attended appearances with him in Iowa and South Carolina – played a big role in winning over bit parts of Middle America to the Obama cause. Ms. Winfrey has since faded into the background of the campaign, but her impact persists.

And Thomas Schaller noted:

Oprah's unprecedented mid-December endorsement of Obama sent a clear signal to her mixed-race female-dominated audience that they should feel as comfortable having Obama on their living room television screens for the nightly newscast as they do having her there during late-afternoon coffee talk,

— Thomas F. Schaller of Salon.com.

== Senate seat consideration ==
The then-governor of Illinois reported being so impressed by Winfrey's influence on the election of Barack Obama that he considered offering Winfrey Obama's vacant senate seat. Governor Blagojevich summarized his reasons for considering Winfrey on various talk shows:

To begin with, she was perhaps the most instrumental person in electing Barack Obama president. She is a larger-than-life figure in America and around the world. She has a huge bully pulpit and tremendous support across America...She has a voice larger than all 100 senators combined. And if she was a U.S. Senator, she would be a voice for the Obama program, which she supports, and she would be in a position to be able to use an unbelievable bully pulpit to be able to get it done. She obviously can't be bought. And she's actually a very, obviously, in my judgment, a very impressive and a very nice person.... On the other hand, how likely is it she'd give up what she's doing for that? I mean, being a senator's a big deal, but it ain't Oprah.

Winfrey responded to the disclosure with amusement, noting that although she was absolutely not interested, she did feel she could be a senator.

Political analyst Chris Matthews praised the idea of making Winfrey a senator suggesting that in one move it would diversify the senate and raise its collective IQ. Elaborating further he said:

Anybody who doesn't think Winfrey would be a great senator from Illinois or anywhere is crazy. She gets along with everybody. She brings people together. She finds common ground. She's way past race politics 20 years ago. She's so far ahead of most people in human relations. And she listens...I think she is up there with Will Rogers and Bob Hope and some of our great public personalities of the last century.

Lynn Sweet of the Chicago Sun-Times agreed with Matthews, claiming Winfrey would be "terrific" and an "enormously popular pick."

== Winfrey's potential presidential run ==
Winfrey was later urged by many media figures to run in the 2020 presidential election, recalling her endorsement of Obama. Obama's successor, President Donald Trump, commented on her decision by stating, "She says she'll run only if she gets the go ahead from the Almighty," he said. "All right Oprah, go ahead and run."
