= Oprah After the Show =

- Created by: Oprah Winfrey
- Country of origin: United States

Production
- Running time: 22 minutes (including commercials)

Original release
- Network: Oxygen
- Release: September 16, 2002 – 2006

Oprah After the Show is a program on the Oxygen cable network from 2002 to 2006. The show was an extra half-hour that allowed the audience to ask questions of the guests for that day's earlier episode of The Oprah Winfrey Show which aired in syndication, and for Oprah Winfrey to introduce extended segments. The program was created mainly as a make good by Winfrey, who had offered her program's archive to Oxygen upon taking an ownership interest in the network, but later changed her mind about airing her older episodes and decided to offer another contribution to the network instead, allegedly because of broadcast syndication exclusivity enforced by Oprah distributor King World.

The program was discontinued on-air in 2006 after Winfrey sold her interest in Oxygen to another party, but the After the Show concept continued as streaming video on the Oprah.com website until the program's May 2011 end. She would found the Oprah Winfrey Network with Discovery, Inc. earlier that year, and has yet to make any of Oprah's archive available in any official capacity outside short clips.
