= Melanie Barnett =

Fictional character in the American sitcom The Game

- The Game character
- Tia Mowry as Melanie Barnett
- First appearance: "The Game" (April 17, 2006)
- Last appearance: "Pow Pow Pow!" (August 5, 2015)
- Created by: Mara Brock Akil
- Portrayed by: Tia Mowry

In-universe information
- Full name: Melanie Barnett-Davis
- Nicknames: Mel, Med School, Girl Melanie
- Gender: Female
- Occupation: Student
- Family: James Barnett (father); Grace Barnett (mother); Cameron Barnett (brother); Joan Clayton (cousin)
- Spouse: Derwin Davis
- Children: Derwin Davis Jr (step-son, with Derwin) twin son and daughter (with Derwin)
- Nationality: American

Melanie Barnett-Davis is a fictional character, portrayed by actress Tia Mowry, who appears in the American sitcom The Game, which aired on the CW Television Network and BET from 2006 to 2015. Introduced in a backdoor pilot on the sitcom Girlfriends as Joan Clayton's cousin, Melanie chooses to support her boyfriend Derwin Davis' career with the San Diego Sabres, a fictional National Football League (NFL) team, rather than attend medical school at Johns Hopkins University. The series focuses primarily on Melanie and Derwin's complicated relationship, with her fears of his infidelity at the center of many of the episodes' storylines. Mowry left the series in 2012 upon learning that her role would be reduced as a result of co-star Pooch Hall's decision to reduce his role on The Game to appear in the crime drama series Ray Donovan. Both actors reprised their roles in the series finale, in which Melanie gives birth to twins.

Melanie was created by producer Mara Brock Akil. While casting the character, Brock Akil had doubts about whether Mowry would be the best choice, given her wholesome image from starring as Tia Landry on the sitcom Sister, Sister, but hired the actress based on her strong work ethic and her desire to be part of the series. Mowry considered the character to be her first adult role and felt it emphasized her individuality and maturity. She identified closely with the part, observing parallels between Melanie's relationship with Derwin and her own marriage to actor Cory Hardrict. She cited The Game as an example of women receiving more lead roles on television.

Reaction to Melanie was primarily negative; critics expressed disapproval of her decision to support her boyfriend instead of enrolling in medical school. Media commentators also panned the character's representation as a mother, such as her inability to properly care for her stepson. On the other hand, fans responded positively to Melanie and felt drawn to her relationship with Derwin. Mowry's performance received positive feedback from critics, who agreed that the role displayed her maturity as an actress. She received nominations for two NAACP Image Awards and a Teen Choice Award for the role.

== Role ==
The Game, which aired on The CW Television Network and BET, explores the lives of a group of women romantically involved with professional football players. Introduced as the cousin of Joan Clayton in a backdoor pilot on Girlfriends, Melanie Barnett aspires to be a doctor and is admitted to the medical school at Johns Hopkins University. Against Joan's objections, Melanie decides against attending Johns Hopkins in favor of moving to San Diego to support her boyfriend Derwin Davis' career with the San Diego Sabers, a fictional National Football League (NFL) team. Melanie enrolls at a local college and becomes a close friend of Tasha Mack, a single mother and manager of quarterback Malik Wright, and Kelly Pitts, the trophy wife of the team's captain, Jason Pitts. She struggles to be accepted by the wives and girlfriends of the San Diego Sabers, who have formed a group named "The Saber Sunbeams". Storylines frequently address her fears that Derwin will cheat on her. She turns to Tasha and Kelly for help in handling the stress of being in a relationship with a professional football player; Tasha and Kelly's advice includes the idea of using an ultraviolet light to check for fluids on hotel bed sheets. Halfway through the show's first season, Derwin proposes marriage to Melanie on live television, during the halftime of a Sabres game. Even though she has concerns, she accepts.

The couple end their engagement after Melanie discovers that Derwin had sex with singer Drew Sidora. Melanie considers returning to her hometown rather than continue "life as a football girlfriend". Following their break-up, she has sex with several men, and Derwin impregnates another woman. Melanie struggles to balance her career with her personal life. Even though Melanie and Derwin have relationships with other people, they still have feelings for each other. Melanie eventually reconciles with Derwin, and the couple marry. She has a strained relationship with her stepson, as she views him as a reminder of Derwin's past infidelity. As a result, Derwin considers her to be an unfit parent and allows her only limited contact with the child. During this time, Melanie reveals to Derwin that she had an abortion, suffering from complications that greatly reduced her chances of conceiving children naturally. She made the decision as she felt that having a child by another man would permanently ruin her relationship with Derwin. At the end of the show's fifth season, Melanie and Derwin move to Baltimore after he is traded to play for a team based in the city, and she finally enrolls at Johns Hopkins University. Melanie returns for the series finale, in which she nears the end of a high-risk pregnancy and gives birth to twins.

== Development ==
=== Creation and casting ===
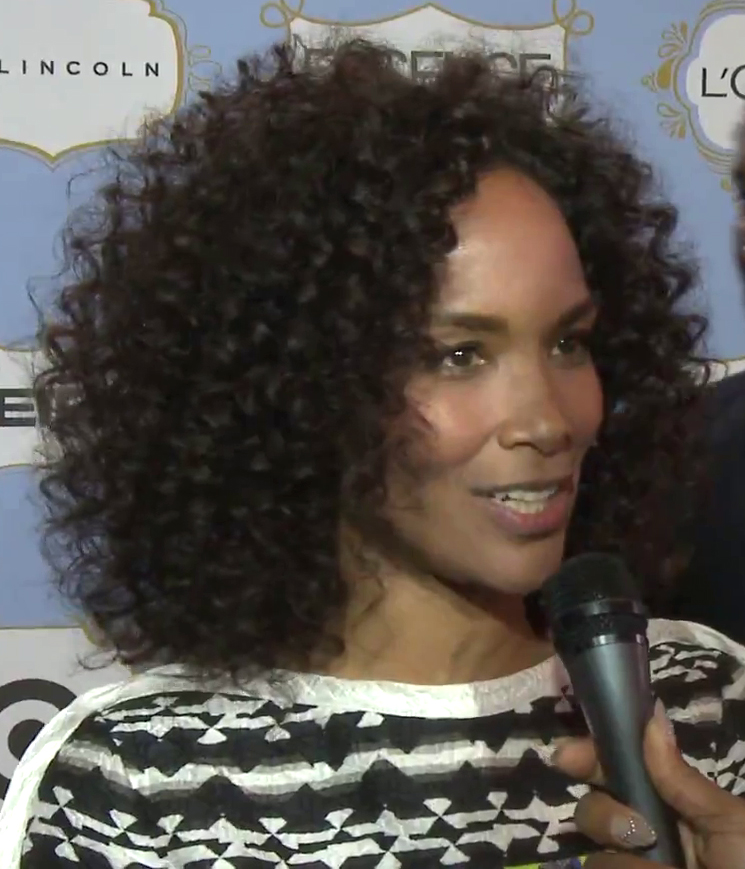
Despite her initial reservations about Mowry, creator Mara Brock Akil (pictured in 2013) praised her audition and her commitment to the character.

Producers Mara Brock Akil and Kelsey Grammer developed The Game as a spin-off of the sitcom Girlfriends. Brock Akil originally conceived the show and the characters of Melanie and Derwin to give viewers access to the world of professional football, a sport she and her husband appreciate. From the series' inception, she intended to include story arcs relating to themes of race and celebrity. The New York Times' Virginia Heffernan wrote that one of the show's objectives was "to relieve ideological tensions instead of creating or ignoring them", citing its multi-ethnic female cast of characters as one of the means of achieving this goal. Melanie, and the rest of main cast of The Game, were first introduced in the Girlfriends episode "The Game". She later made a cameo appearance alongside Derwin in Girlfriends' Season 7 finale "It's Been Determined" as guests at Joan's engagement party.

Cynthia Addai-Robinson was originally cast to play Melanie, but was replaced by Tia Mowry prior to development of the backdoor pilot. The CW Television Network did not provide a reason for the casting change. Critics frequently billed Mowry as The Game's lead actress, and Brock Akil referred to Melanie and Derwin as "the heart" of the series.

Mowry's twin sister Tamera Mowry accompanied her to her audition. Tamera had tried out for the role previously; she said it was common for them to read for the same part, but emphasized that "[they're] very different actors." When she saw the two women together, Brock Akil initially debated whether they would be appropriate for the show's tone. She was concerned about the sisters' wholesome image gained from their years as child actors on the sitcom Sister, Sister, explaining, "I had a certain image of them. I didn't know if they wanted to go where I wanted the character to go."

On hearing of the twins' interest in the show, Brock Akil asked them if their management was aware of her writing style. When questioned by Brock Akil, Tia responded: "I'm a woman, Mara. I can do this." Though Tia was chosen for the part, Tamera later appeared as a guest star during the show's fifth season. Brock Akil said Tia won the role over Tamera because she had a more "serious personality" and "made all the necessary adjustments to get this part". The producer explained that she appreciated Tia's work ethic and her strong desire to be a part of the series; she described Tia's audition as "fighting everybody's preconceived notions of her" by playing the more mature Melanie.

=== Portrayal and characterization ===
Prior to hearing about The Game, Mowry had changed her appearance in order to be perceived as more mature and to emphasize the differences between herself and her twin sister. During this process, she lost 10 pounds (4.5 kg) and straightened her hair for auditions. To prepare for the role, she frequently consulted her cousin, retired NFL fullback Jameel Cook, and other professional athletes. Mowry felt playing the role of Melanie would enable her to be perceived as more mature following her appearances as Tia Landry on Sister, Sister. When discussing her reasons for auditioning, she said she wanted to take on a more difficult role. She also described The Game as an opportunity to showcase her individuality. Mowry identified Melanie as the closest match to her personality in comparison to her previous roles. She cited her character's relationship with Derwin as reminiscent of her own romance and subsequent marriage to actor Cory Hardrict.

Describing Melanie as a "vixen", Mowry believes the character's imperfections allowed her to grow as an actor. She felt the show was evidence, alongside Sex and the City and Desperate Housewives, that women had more leading roles on television, and said this "allows women to be women and to show their different emotions and what we deal with in life – period". Melanie's intellect, one of her defining characteristics, earned her the nickname "Med School". Vibe Vixen's Jennifer Hickman referred to Melanie as "bookwormy", and Virginia Heffernan characterized her as "wholesome and a good student" in the pilot. Heffernan called the character a "kind of Cosby Show figure" due to her initial reluctance to join the Sabre Sunbeams.

=== Departure and return ===
After The Game aired for three seasons on the CW, the network canceled the series, having decided to stop developing sitcoms. Picked up by BET, the show aired for six more seasons. Mowry and Hall left The Game in 2012 after Hall accepted a lead role in the crime drama television series Ray Donovan. Mowry left the show when Melanie's role was slated to become "less important" in comparison to previous seasons. Announcing her departure on Twitter, she emphasized that it was a mutual decision with the network. Brock Akil said she provided closure to Melanie and Derwin's story arc through their exit, explaining: "They're together, and we were able to put a period on their story."

Following Melanie and Derwin's exit, two characters, draft pick Bryce "The Blueprint" Westbrook and child star Keira Whitaker, portrayed by Jay Ellis and Lauren London, respectively, were introduced on the series. Media outlets viewed Keira and London as replacing Melanie and Mowry, but Ellis and London objected to comparisons made between Melanie and Derwin and Bryce and Lauren, believing the two pairs were separate characters. Following Mowry's exit, actress Keke Palmer was offered a lead role in the series but turned it down due to scheduling conflicts with the development of her daytime talk show Just Keke. Brock Akil described the changes made to The Game as a "true resurrection", with Wendy Raquel Robinson (Tasha Mack) saying future episodes would be "completely different, crisper and edgier and sexier".

For the series finale, Mowry and Hall reprised their roles as Melanie and Derwin even though Mowry had written on her Facebook page that she would not reappear on the show. Hall announced their return during the 2015 BET Awards, where the show's cast had attended to say "their final goodbyes". Discussing the direction intended for Melanie and Derwin's final appearance, Brock Akil said: "To bring these characters back to shore is such a blessing. They get an ending. They get closure." She added that their storyline would appeal to the show's fans, explaining: "I feel creatively we've been able to answer those who have been loyal to us. It's truly a tip of the hat to the fans who will get to see if Melanie and Derwin get their happily-ever-after."

In 2021, Paramount+ premiered a revival of The Game, which takes place in Las Vegas and addresses social issues such as chronic traumatic encephalopathy in sports. Mowry chose to not return for the revival as she believed Melanie's storyline was complete and she wanted to focus on new projects.

== Critical reception ==
=== Response to Melanie ===
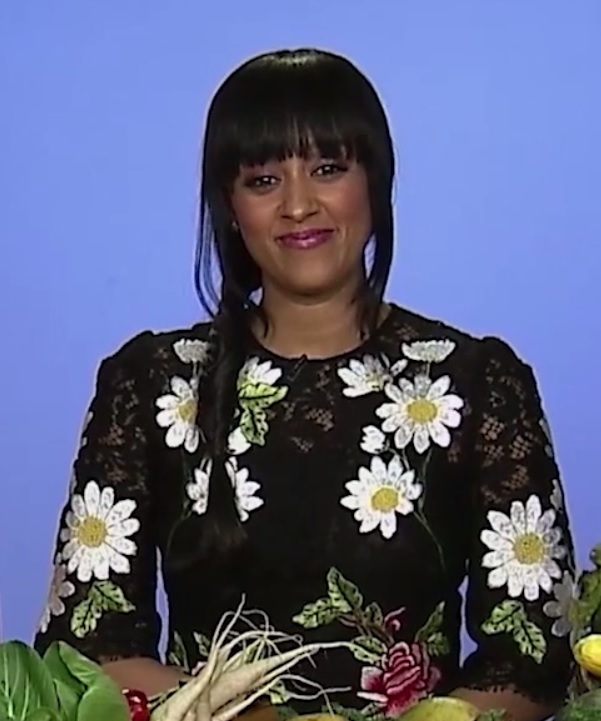
Mowry (pictured in 2017) received a positive response from critics for her performance as Melanie.

Melanie Barnett has been negatively received by television critics. Melanie McFarland of The Seattle Post-Intelligencer panned the character along with the show's main premise ("A woman on a professional track kicks it all aside to chase a football player"), feeling they were contradictory to the message of the parent show Girlfriends. Echoing McFarland's assessment, The San Francisco Chronicle's Tim Goodman found Melanie's decision to be "a bleak little life lesson". When discussing the transition to BET, Britney Wilson of Clutch was critical of the deterioration of female friendships on the show, citing "the disintegration of the female identity" as signs of The Game's declining quality.

The character's representation as a mother also received criticism. Wilson viewed negatively Melanie's decision to have an abortion in an attempt to reconcile with Derwin, and criticized the show's depiction of an abortion causing Melanie to become barren as based on "a link that is not medically solid". In her 2015 book Representations of Black Women in the Media: The Damnation of Black Womanhood, California State University associate professor Marquita Marie Gammage felt the character was perpetuating negative images of black motherhood on television. Gammage criticized the series for showing Melanie becoming a wife "at the expanse of her career and possibility of bear[ing] her own children" and portraying her as unable to care for her stepson. She contrasted Melanie to white characters on television, writing that "white women seem to achieve it all and control their realities on their own terms."

Mowry received positive feedback from fans, who "were fairly obsessed with Melanie and Derwin's journey early on". Fans reacted positively to the characters' relationship, and dubbed the couple the portmanteau "Merwin", which BET adopted and used to promote Mowry and Hall's appearances in the series finale. Jaime Lee of Soap Opera Network wrote that, in relating to their struggles, viewers connected with the fictional couple. A writer from HuffPost cited the pairing as a "big part of the winning formula for the series", and Mowry attributed the positive fan response to her chemistry with Hall. She said the following about the character's reception in The Washington Post:

Through the course of playing Melanie, some people would love her, some would hate her, some would judge her[.] But I think they connected with her – they enjoyed her vulnerability, they enjoyed relating to her. ... It's refreshing to see a couple that's not perfect on television, a couple that works through trials and tribulations.

=== Response to Mowry ===
Mowry's performance received positive feedback from critics. While discussing her career in his 2010 book Encyclopedia of African American Actresses in Film and Television, author Bob McCann wrote that Mowry demonstrated maturity through her more dramatic role in the series. Though critical of the overall show, the Chicago Tribune's Maureen Ryan was pleased with Mowry's charismatic performance. Melody K. Hoffman of Jet wrote that, through her performance in the show, Mowry had demonstrated her love for acting and her capacity to portray a woman. In a negative review, USA Today's Robert Bianco was uncertain of Mowry's capabilities as a comedic actress, saying she frequently relied on child acting techniques that were inappropriate for an adult character.

Mowry received two nominations for NAACP Image Award for Outstanding Actress in a Comedy Series at the 39th and 43rd NAACP Image Awards. She was also nominated for the Teen Choice Award for Choice TV Actress Comedy in the 2007 Teen Choice Awards.
