= List of The Game characters =

This is a list of the characters and plot points from the American comedy-drama television series The Game.

== Characters ==
=== Main ===
Actor	Character	Seasons										
Actor	Character	1	2	3	4	5	6	7	8	9	10 (1)	11 (2)
Tia Mowry-Hardrict	Melanie Barnett-Davis	Main	Main	Main	Main	Main				Guest		
Brittany Daniel	Kelly Pitts	Main	Main	Main	Recurring			Recurring	Main	Main	—N/a	—N/a
Hosea Chanchez	Malik Wright	Main	Main	Main	Main	Main	Main	Main	Main	Main	Main	Main
Coby Bell	Jason Pitts	Main	Main	Main	Recurring	Recurring	Main	Main	Main	Main	Guest	Guest
Pooch Hall	Derwin Davis	Main	Main	Main	Main	Main	Guest			Guest	Guest	—N/a
Wendy Raquel Robinson	LaTasha Mack	Main	Main	Main	Main	Main	Main	Main	Main	Main	Main	Main
Brandy Norwood	Chardonnay Pitts					Recurring	Main	Main	Main	Main		
Lauren London	Keira Whitaker						Main	Main	Main	Main		
Jay Ellis	Bryce "Blueprint" Westbrook						Main	Main	Main	Main		
Adriyan Rae	Brittany Pitts										Main	Main
Vaughn Hebron	Jamison Fields										Main	Main
Analisa Velez	Raquel Navarro										Main	Main
Toby Sandeman	Garret Evans										Main	Main

=== Recurring ===
Actor	Character	Seasons										
Actor	Character	1	2	3	4	5	6	7	8	9	10 (1)	11 (2)
Barry Floyd	Terrence "Tee-Tee" Carter	Recurring	Recurring	Recurring	Recurring	Recurring	Recurring	Recurring	Recurring	Recurring	Recurring	Recurring
Erica Gluck / Katlynn Simone Smith	Brittany Pitts	Recurring	Recurring	Recurring	Recurring	Recurring	Recurring	Recurring	Recurring	Recurring		
Bumper Robinson	Juvon Glenn	Recurring	Recurring	Recurring	Recurring	Recurring	Recurring	TBA	Recurring	Recurring		TBA
Shanti Lowry	Dionne Marie Taylor	Recurring	Recurring	Recurring					Recurring			TBA
P.J. Byrne	Irv Smiff	Recurring	Recurring	Recurring		Recurring				Guest		TBA
Gregory Alan Williams	James Barnett	Recurring		Recurring	Recurring							TBA
Claudette Roche	Grace Barnett	Recurring		Recurring	Recurring							TBA
Tahj Mowry	Cameron Barnett	Recurring		Recurring								TBA
Drew Sidora	Drew Sidora	Recurring	Recurring									TBA
Rocky Carroll	Kenny Taylor	Recurring	Recurring									TBA
Caryn Ward	Erica Harrison	Recurring	Recurring	Recurring	Recurring				Recurring			TBA
Kendra C. Johnson	Renee Royce	Recurring	Recurring									TBA
Chaz Lamar Shepherd	Trey Wiggs	Recurring	Recurring			Recurring						TBA
Tae Heckard	Jazz		Recurring	Recurring	Recurring	Recurring	Recurring	Recurring	Recurring	Recurring		TBA
Rick Fox	Rick Fox		Recurring	Recurring		Recurring	Recurring	Recurring	TBA	Recurring		Recurring
Robin Givens	Robin Givens		Recurring	Recurring								TBA
Gabrielle Dennis	Janay Brice		Recurring	Recurring	Recurring	Recurring						TBA
Lee Majors	Coach Ross		Recurring	Recurring								TBA
Mehcad Brooks	Jerome		Recurring	Recurring								TBA
Rockmond Dunbar	Pookie			Recurring		Recurring	Recurring	Recurring	Recurring	Recurring		TBA
Jason Olive	McHottie			Recurring		Recurring						TBA
Michael Boatman	Lawrence Chauncey Wright			Recurring								TBA
Lisa Tucker	Pucci Wright			Recurring								TBA
Stacey Dash	Camille Rose			Recurring	Recurring							
Terrence Jenkins	Donté				Recurring							TBA
Chris Webber	Chris Webber				Recurring							TBA
Meagan Good	Parker Keith				Recurring							TBA
Tika Sumpter	Jenna Rice				Recurring	Recurring						TBA
Isley Anderson	D.J.				Recurring	Recurring				Guest		TBA
Charles Michael Davis	Kwan Kirkland				Recurring	Recurring						TBA
Jigga	Bibs				Recurring	Recurring	Recurring	Recurring	Recurring	Recurring		TBA
Michael Beach	Roger Keith				Recurring	Recurring	Recurring		Recurring	Recurring		TBA
Janet Varney	Summer Grayson					Recurring						TBA
Ciara	Ciara						Recurring					TBA
Candice Patton	Tori						Recurring	Recurring				TBA
LaMonica Garrett	Luke Rogers						Recurring					TBA
Miranda Rae Mayo	Patreece Sheibani						Recurring					TBA
Carissa Capobianco	Nina						Recurring	Recurring				TBA
Danielle Nicolet	Yana							Recurring	Recurring	Recurring		TBA
Aaron Edwards	Tommy Pitts							Recurring				TBA

== Series cast main character format ==
Legacy Characters of the series appeared throughout the various seasons through its different iterations. Though seen as an ensemble cast of leads, the original characters of Melanie and Derwin was most known as the leads of the CW series. Organically the show centered and surrounded the life of Melanie Barnett, a pre-med student who struggled to keep a relationship with a pro-football player while the rest of the cast storylines were supported dealing with the life and experiences dating football players as well as the athletes highs and lows of their careers and also raising one while representing athletes. During the changes of the BET revival and re-casting of season 6, new characters were brought in to fill the main cast, hoping that Keira and Bryce/'Blue' would make up for the main characters but ultimately resulting in the ensemble becoming collectively as leads as their storylines were equally displayed. Subsequently with the Paramount+ revival series, Tasha Mack and Malik Wright became the longest running characters of the series with Tasha Mack becoming lead character as the storyline centers more about her struggles to run her sports agency.

Series	Main Characters	Original supporting cast guest appearances
CW series (seasons 1–3)	Original legacy cast: Melanie Barnett; Derwin Davis; Tasha Mack; Malik Wright; Jason Pitts; Kelly Pitts	Recurring series supporting key characters: Tee-Tee Carter (seasons 1–9); Rick Fox (seasons 2–9); Pookie (seasons 3, 5–9); Janay Brice (seasons 2–5); Brittany Pitts (seasons 1–9)
BET revival series (seasons 4–9)	Legacy cast: Melanie Barnett-Davis (departed after season 5, guest season 9); Derwin Davis (departed after season 6, guest season 9); Tasha Mack; Malik Wright; Jason Pitts; Kelly Pitts (recurred seasons 4, 7, main seasons 8–9)	Recurring series supporting key characters: Tee-Tee Carter (seasons 1–9); Rick Fox (seasons 2–9); Pookie (seasons 3, 5–9); Janay Brice (seasons 2–5); Brittany Pitts (seasons 1–9)
BET revival series (seasons 4–9)	New cast: Bryce Westbrook; Keira Whitaker; Chardonnay Pitts (recurred season 5, main seasons 6–9)	Recurring series supporting key characters: Tee-Tee Carter (seasons 1–9); Rick Fox (seasons 2–9); Pookie (seasons 3, 5–9); Janay Brice (seasons 2–5); Brittany Pitts (seasons 1–9)
Paramount+ revival series (seasons 1–2) also known as season 10–11	Legacy cast: Tasha Mack; Malik Wright; Brittany Pitts (upgraded to main cast)	Original series legacy supporting characters in sequel revival: Derwin Davis (season 1, episode 6); Jason Pitts (season 1, episodes 8 & 9; season 2, episode 1); Pookie (season 1, episode 5, season 2 episode 3); Rick Fox (season 2, episodes 1-3); Tee-Tee Carter (season 2, episodes 1 & 8)
Paramount+ revival series (seasons 1–2) also known as season 10–11	New cast: Jamison Fields; Raquel Narravo; Garrett Evans	Original series legacy supporting characters in sequel revival: Derwin Davis (season 1, episode 6); Jason Pitts (season 1, episodes 8 & 9; season 2, episode 1); Pookie (season 1, episode 5, season 2 episode 3); Rick Fox (season 2, episodes 1-3); Tee-Tee Carter (season 2, episodes 1 & 8)

== Legacy main characters ==
=== Melanie Barnett-Davis ===
Dr. Melanie Barnett Davis
- The Game character
- First appearance: "The Game" (Backdoor Pilot) (Girlfriends - episode 6.18)
- Last appearance: Pow Pow Pow (The Game)
- Portrayed by: Tia Mowry

In-universe information
- Nicknames: "Mel" by Derwin Davis, "Med School" by Tasha Mack, "Girl Melanie" by Malik Wright, "Melinda" by Jason Pitts
- Occupation: Doctor
- Affiliation: Licensed MD, Johns Hopkins School of Medicine
- Spouse: Derwin Davis (m. 2009)
- Significant other: Jerome Rice (ex-boyfriend)
- Children: Derwin Davis Jr (step-son, with Derwin) twin son and daughter (with Derwin)
- Relatives: Dr. James Barnett (father); Grace Barnett (mother); Cameron Barnett (brother); Joan Clayton (cousin)
- Date Anniversary: November 28, 2002 (Derwin Davis)

- Dr. Melanie Barnett Davis, M.D., played by Tia Mowry, is a third-year medical school student from Connecticut who has given up an offer of admission to Johns Hopkins University School of Medicine in Baltimore to follow her boyfriend, Sabers rising star receiver Derwin Davis, to San Diego against the advice of her parents and her cousin Joan Clayton, the lead character from the UPN/CW sitcom Girlfriends.

She is the daughter of a high-powered surgeon. Her brother is Cameron, who is portrayed by Tahj Mowry (Tia Mowry's younger brother). Melanie becomes friends with Kelly Pitts, the wife of veteran wide receiver Jason Pitts, and Tasha Mack, mother and manager of the Sabers star quarterback Malik Wright. Though their relations are rocky, Melanie, Kelly, and Tasha still maintain a close bond. Melanie also becomes friends with her former rival, Dionne, who was once Derwin's image consultant and Melanie's eventual roommate.

Melanie began her relationship with Derwin in college. At the end of Season 1, Derwin cheats on Melanie with Drew Sidora, and Melanie finds out. At the start of Season 2, Melanie leaves Derwin. After she breaks up with Derwin, she confides in her old friend Trey Wiggs. She eventually has a one-night stand with Trey. In the middle of Season 3, Derwin is seeing Janay and Melanie begins dating Jerome Rice. At the end of Season 2, Derwin reveals his love for Melanie and forces her to choose. Melanie turns Derwin down but then realizes that she is still in love with him. She returns to Derwin's apartment only to find out that Janay is pregnant with Derwin's child. After they break up once more in the middle of season 3, this time due to her infidelity with Dr. Buriss/Dr. McHottie, Derwin and Janay try to work things out while Melanie has a fling with her boss, Dr. Buriss. Melanie and Derwin eventually get back together, even though Janay is pregnant, and they have a wedding planned; but just as the ceremony is about to start, Derwin receives word that Janay has gone into labor. Derwin and Melanie eventually get married, after the baby is born, in the hospital chapel.

Two years later in Season 4, Melanie has decided to put her residency on hold and is focusing more on being the wife of a now famous and wealthy athlete Derwin and a stepmother to his son Derwin Junior (DJ), as the couple has now moved into a brand-new mansion and has even done a photo shoot for Essence magazine. Having insecurities about whether Derwin is the father of DJ, Melanie swabs a DNA sample of DJ while babysitting him, with the initial test revealing Derwin is not DJ's father. However, a later test reveals that Derwin indeed is the father, leaving Melanie with the task of telling Derwin about the test. Melanie and Derwin go see a fertility doctor about why they're having problems conceiving, and Melanie is asked if she has ever had an abortion. She says no; Derwin, recognizing that she lied, questions Melanie about the abortion and asks if it was his or not. In the premiere episode of Season 5, Melanie admits that she had an abortion. Derwin originally believes that it was when he and Melanie were in college; however, she tells him that it was actually from her affair with Trey Wiggs. She confesses that the reason she had the abortion was to spare Derwin from living with a reminder of her affair, which is the way she feels about DJ. Even though she makes it seem as though the abortion has not affected her, she seems to show feelings of guilt when she is alone. Feeling a void in her life, Melanie opts to continue trying to have a child, and later finds a surrogate in Tasha. Tasha eventually reneges on their arrangement to be with Pookie. Melanie later realizes that having a baby is not what she wants and leaves to attend Johns Hopkins on the day of the Championship Game, much to Derwin's dismay. At the end of the episode, however, he surprises her at the airport, telling her that he is flying there, with her.

=== Derwin Davis ===
Derwin Davis
- The Game character
- First appearance: "The Game"; Girlfriends, (Season 6, Episode 18)
- Last appearance: New Whips, Same Chains (Season 10, Episode 6)
- Portrayed by: Aldis Hodge (2006); Pooch Hall (2006–present)

In-universe information
- Nicknames: Rookie, Ding Dong (Franchise Player), Son (as in from the Holy Trinity, Jason is the Father and Malik is the Holy Ghost)
- Occupation: Football player (2006–2015); Sports podcaster (2021–present)
- Spouse: Melanie Barnett (m. 2009)
- Children: Derwin Davis Jr. (D.J.) with ex-girlfriend Janay twin son and daughter (with wife Melanie)
- In universe awards: Music Video Awards: Best Kiss (Derwin Davis & Drew Sidora)
- Date Anniversary: November 28, 2002 (Melanie Barnett)

Derwin Davis
No. 81 – San Diego Sabers
- Position: Wide receiver

Personal information
- Born: September 20, 1984 (age 42); Virginia
- Listed height: 5 ft 10 in (1.78 m)
- Listed weight: 185 lb (84 kg)

Career information
- College: Pennsylvania
- NFL draft: 2006: 2nd round, 61st overall pick

Career history
- San Diego Sabers

Awards and highlights
- Champion (2008) *Best Rookie (2006); Championship Playoffs (2012); MVP

- Derwin ("Ding Dong") Davis is a star wide receiver with the San Diego Sabers and the husband of Melanie Barnett. Aldis Hodge portrayed the original Derwin in the Girlfriends pilot. Hodge was replaced by Pooch Hall for the TV series.

In the first season Derwin goes through the hazing from Sabers captain Jason Pitts, and starting quarterback Malik Wright, whom he ultimately becomes friends with. Towards the end of the season, Malik and Jason "adopt" Derwin. In "To Baby...Or Not to Baby" Derwin proposes to Melanie at half-time of one of the Saber games because he thinks that Melanie might be pregnant. Melanie accepts at first feeling pressured on national television. However, later on Melanie tells Derwin that it is not the right time. Derwin meets singer Drew Sidora at a party he attends with Malik, and Drew asks Derwin to be in her new video, which he accepts not knowing he will play her love interest. Derwin and Drew get close and end up having sex. Dionne tells Derwin she knows he slept with Drew, and Melanie over-hears and calls off the engagement, and their relationship.

Derwin tries to reuniting with Melanie but Melanie shows up with football player and Derwin's rival Trey Wiggs to move her stuff from Derwin's apartment. Derwin's standout performance in training camp (and Jason's poor performance) earned Derwin a starting spot with the Sabers. In season 2, Derwin starts becoming more of a playboy jock rather than his humble church ways. After a few "hookups" Derwin starts dating Janay. Although Melanie begins dating Jerome, she is jealous of Derwin and Janay. Janay finds "Dr. Grizzly", the stuffed bear Derwin bought Melanie, and Derwin throws the bear into a waste basket, but later recovers it and hides it in a drawer. Derwin hurts his knee in a Sabers' playoff game and can not play in the Super Bowl, so he decides not to go to Miami with the team. Melanie misses Derwin and decides to pay him a visit, and they share a passionate kiss, but Melanie goes to L.A. with her boyfriend, Jerome. An intoxicated Derwin goes with Malik to L.A. to seek out Melanie. Derwin tells her, "You look me in my eyes and you tell me you don't love me?" Jerome and Derwin fight and Melanie confesses to Jerome that she loves Derwin. Melanie goes to Derwin's apartment, but Derwin finds out that Janay is pregnant with his baby.

In season 3, Derwin and Melanie get back together, but Melanie is jealous when Derwin goes with Janay to her first pregnancy appointment. After Melanie and Derwin break up again, Derwin decides to get back together with Janay since he is the father of her baby. Janay discovers that Derwin is still in love with Melanie after she finds the bear she thought had been thrown away. Melanie and Derwin get back together and Derwin proposes again, and Melanie accepts, and decides she wants to marry Derwin before the baby arrives. The baby comes when Derwin and Melanie are at the altar. Derwin rushes to the hospital, leaving Melanie at the altar. Later that night Derwin and Melanie get married in a private ceremony. In the fourth season premiere, there are some questions regarding the true paternity of Derwin's son. Derwin also emerges as a superstar player in season 4, getting numerous endorsement deals, including Nike, and becomes the new face of the Sabers organization. In season 5 premiere he asks Melanie if she had an abortion and she eventually admits that she did. He does not like the fact but thinks it was while the couple were in college. When she tells him it was Trey Wiggs' he is mad that she aborted a child even if not his. Since firing Tasha as his manager Derwin has been in the need of a new representation and hires his old agent Irv Smith to manage him prompting Tasha to take legal action as a way to get her money back for a Verizon sponsorship she had recently set up for him. Later Derwin attempts to build a friendship with Kwan off the field with the hope that it will build more chemistry on the field, but Kwan is non receptive and he soon learns that his friendship with Malik has been destroyed because of the Kwan situation. After fixing his relationship with Malik, Derwin attempts to get Malik back on the field with a campaign called "WMD" (What Malik DOing), Derwin admits that he has ulterior motives but he believes this is the only way him and Malik can get back to real friendship. After the owner tells Derwin that Kwan is the starter this adds further contentiousness to their relationship. Derwin finds out that Melanie is unable to have children because of a medical condition and takes it hard, handling it by having a party with Malik and Jason and getting drunk. In the episode "Derwin about to go ham", Kwan and Derwin's animosity reaches the critical level after Kwan refuses to throw Derwin the ball in the first half of a crucial game. In the locker room they engage in a small altercation. Back on the field Kwan is told to call a pass play but at the last minute audibles out for a run, Derwin going into motion "misses" a block and Kwan's knee is brutally hurt and he is lost for the game and possibly the season. Malik comes in to fill in for Kwan and the dream team of Malik + Derwin is back together and they lead a comeback victory. At the press conference Derwin is bombarded with questions about the play that Kwan got hurt with members of the media insinuating that Derwin missed it on purpose, Derwin leaves the press conferences without answering further questions. Back at home Derwin becomes a shell of himself isolating himself off from everyone else because of the pain knowing that everyone is blaming him for what happened. Melanie soon convinces him to leave the house and while at the gas station a fan approaches him, blaming him for the injury and spitting on his car. Later Derwin visits Malik and gets advice about how to get through this and how to not stress so much about his image and focus more on football and his career. After returning home Derwin and Melanie have a truth moment and he reveals that he missed it on purpose because of Kwan's attempt to threaten the legacy. He tells her that there are two Derwins: regular Derwin, and Der win at any means necessary (If it means protecting, his family, and the legacy). In the final episode of Season 5, he leaves with Melanie for Baltimore so she can pursue her dream of being a doctor after he lived his of being a champion football player. In Season 6 Derwin is traded to Baltimore in exchange for Bryce "The Blueprint" Westbrook (or just 'Blue'), much to his chagrin. He returned in season 9 finale with Melanie to share the news with everyone that they are having twins.

In Season 10 (season 1 paramount+, episode 6), Derwin is revealed to be the number 1 popular sports podcaster with a show called "Derwin Talks". He pays a visit to Las Vegas to take on Tasha Mack's new Caucasian client Keith Kincaid who in the past made racist remarks over twitter, which forces Tasha to defend him. This creates friction between the two. He also was there to ask Tasha Mack a favor for his support to manage him once more to get back on the field, expressing his past knee injury has healed. But she denies he had what it took to continue after his retirement and injury. He make attempts to practice alone on the field, but realizes his dream may never come into fruition, because his knee is still not healed as he thought.

=== LaTasha Mack ===
LaTasha Mack
- The Game & The Game (2021) character
- First appearance: "The Game" (Backdoor Pilot) (Girlfriends - episode 6.18)
- Portrayed by: Wendy Raquel Robinson

In-universe information
- Full name: LaTasha Sojourner Mack
- Nicknames: Ma (by Malik); Tasha; Ms. Mack (by Tee-Tee); Witchie-Poo & Broom-Hilda (by Jason); Miggity Mack (by herself)
- Occupation: Sports agent: C.E.O. of Tasha Mack Management (2006–2008); Agent at ISM (Irv Smiff Management) (2008–2017); C.E.O. of Tasha Mack Agency (2017–2021); Owner: Owner of Club End Zone; C.E.O of Oakmont Sports Academy; Owner of Las Vegas Fightin' Fury (2022 sitting position)
- Spouses: Marion 'Pookie' Woods (husband, renewed vows)
- Significant others: Lawrence 'Chauncey' Wright (ex-boyfriend); Kenny (Coach T) (ex-boyfriend); Rick Fox (ex-boyfriend); Dante (ex-boyfriend)
- Children: Malik Wright (son, with Chauncey Wright); Kai Mack (daughter, with Pookie - birthed Nov. 2015)
- Relatives: Brittany Pitts (God Niece); Walter (estranged father); Grandma Mack (grandmother)
- Origin: Richmond, California
- Awards: Mogul Magazine Awards 2022 (Mogy Award)

- La'Tasha (Tasha) Sojourner Mack is portrayed by Wendy Raquel Robinson. Tasha is a wise-cracking, outspoken crazy mom. She is the mother/manager of the show's star quarterback Malik Wright. She grew up in Richmond, California and had a baby in high school with her longtime boyfriend Chauncey Wright. As the show progresses, Malik fires Tasha. She then signs a contract with ISM (Irv Smiff Management). In season 3 Tasha is fired from ISM due to the company's job cuts.

Tasha is best friends with Melanie Barnett and Kelly Pitts. In season 3, Tasha and Kelly go through a rift in their relationship. At Melanie and Derwin's first wedding, Tasha reveals that she introduced Jason to Camille, his new girlfriend. Kelly responds by punching Tasha in the face.

Tasha's first known relationship is with Malik's old head coach, Kenny (Coach T). Malik finds out and disapproves, and due to Tasha's temper, Tasha and Kenny soon break up. Her next relationship was with famous former Laker Rick Fox. Rick becomes a manager at ISM, and after Tasha becomes vulnerable she falls in love with Rick. When Tasha gets fired from ISM and Rick gets promoted, Tasha believes Rick tricked her and they break up. In the season 3 finale, Rick comes back for Tasha and the fate of their relationship is unknown.

After high school her boyfriend Chauncey went to college and left Tasha to be a single mother. When Malik finally meets his father it is revealed that he has a younger sister, Pucci, played by Lisa Tucker. Chauncey married a woman who is strikingly similar to Tasha named Sheila, played by Tasha Smith. Tasha & Chauncey resolve their past issues and make up.

Two years later, Tasha is now Derwin's agent and appears to be a very successful sports agent, making Derwin a superstar & "the face of Nike", while dating a much younger man named Danté. Dante is obviously in love with Tasha but she is leery of letting their romance be witnessed in public so she tells Dante she can do her thing, he can do his thing and they can do their thing together. Meanwhile, she tries to keep Melanie from ruining her marriage to Derwin, as she advised Melanie to let her doubts about DJ go, continue living the happy life and not to answer the phone getting the test results of which Melanie ignored. Tasha resolved her issues with Kelly and threatened to shoot her if the incident (see above) happened again. Tasha and Melanie having a very heated argument about Tasha representing both Malik and Derwin and Tasha is fired by Melanie. She eventually questions if she should have stayed with Derwin after Malik starts to do wrongdoing. Tasha becomes the main antagonist for the first half of season five, determined to one-up Melanie at every turn; their feud intensifies after Melanie takes over a fashion show that she (Tasha) had planned. At the Sunbeam Fashion Show, Tasha ends up being locked in the bathroom with Melanie, and they ultimately mend their friendship. In season six, she changed the Sunbeam image and she appointed herself Sunbeam president and put Chardonnay as 2nd in command. However, she also becomes entangled in a love triangle with Rick and Pookie (she becomes engaged to the latter), and drags Chardonnay into the mix. The love triangle is ultimately exposed by Jason (who discovered this from Chardonnay), damaging her relationship with Pookie. After Pookie breaks up with her, she gets back together with Rick.

After dating Rick for a while, Tasha is still not happy and thus breaks up with him, leaving herself alone once more. She later undergoes a full-day therapy session to figure out the root of her relationship problems, boiling down to her codependent relationship with her son. Since Malik was born, Tasha has been treating him as she would to a husband, and Malik, who later joins her in therapy, grows tired of this due to his own tendency of dating needy women to feel needed. Tasha realizes that all her life since Malik of proving herself has resulted in pushing people away, including boyfriends.

In season seven, Tasha discovers that she is pregnant with a girl and unsure if the child's father is Pookie or Rick Fox. In the season finale, Tasha gives birth to her daughter, Kai, named by her godfather Tee-Tee. Pookie arrives shortly after the birth and a DNA test confirms that he is Kai's father.

In season 10 (season 1 paramount+), Tasha, Pookie, Khai and Malik moved to Las Vegas where she still owns Tasha Mack Agency. She now owns her own private jet. She comes into conflict often with the owner of a Las Vegas Professional football team called The Fightin' Fury, which was thought to be passed down and owned by Malik but was sidelined for him to strike a deal to become a quarterback for a year now in order to have the new title. She also becomes an agent for multiple players for the team including Malik once again. Tasha takes up issues many issues with the new players which became an issue for Pookie as he considered divorcing Tasha due to unavailability, subsequently after reconciling their differences they renew their vows. She also encounter problems surrounding her daughter Khai at Tennis camp with resulting in the presidents firing due to discrimination, leading Tasha to become the head of Oakmont Sports Academy. However is sidelined by learning Brittany Pitts made her owner of Club Ends Zone without her permission as Colonel is interested in this business venture. This leads to her losing her trust with Brit-Brat and was forced to fire her, but she surrendered to the duty by the season finale. She found herself in a dilemma with the Colonel's offer towards Malik in which he threatened her if the team strikes.

In Season 11 (season 2 paramount+), Mack struggles to meet the demands of the Colonel on the brink of losing her position as head of Tasha Mack Agency (TMA), which was obtained by her from Rick Fox Agency in 2017 after he stepped down by offering her to lead the agency. In a prequel premiere episode, it is revealed she didn't have a certification to become an agent, and aspired to pursue draft pick Garrett Evans as a client.. Present day 2022, with a few hours before the colonels deal to close, she assured she will give the money to him for the pay out to save her. Pressured and stressed, she felt she may lose it all, but had hopes when Brittany secretly helped her by getting Rick Fox to save the agency, which turns for the worse when he sold her out making his own deal with the colonel himself. Weeks later, Tasha struggled to make peace with losing everything as she is awarded a Mogy Award for Mogul Magazines most influential people, to which she wasn't ready to accept but would by her own terms to bash the Colonel, however it was sideline by his absence. She was supported by her daughter Kai, Pookie and Malik. She later learns the reason for his absence from the news where it was revealed his plane crashed near Las Vegas.

=== Malik Wright ===
Malik El DeBarge Wright-Mack
- The Game & The Game (2021) character
- First appearance: Girlfriends
- Portrayed by: Hosea Chanchez

In-universe information
- Nicknames: 40 Mill, Lik-Lik, Holy Ghost
- Gender: Male
- Occupation: Football Player; Owner of Phatty's (2015)
- Family: Tasha Mack (mother); Chauncey Wright (father); Shelia Wright (stepmother); Pucci Wright (half-sister); Kai Mack (half-sister); Mark (half-brother); Matthew (half-brother)
- Spouse: Robin Givens (divorced)
- Significant others: Renee (ex-girlfriend); Eva Marcelle (ex-girlfriend); Parker (ex-sexual partner) Jenna (ex-girlfriend); Yana (ex-girlfriend)
- Relatives: Walter Mack (grandfather); Tasha's Mother (grandmother)
- Origin: Richmond, California
- Quotes frequently used: "Boy Please" "Boy shut up!!!"

Malik Wright
No. 3 – San Diego Sabers / Las Vegas Fightin' Fury
- Position: Quarterback

Personal information
- Born: October 23, 1981 (age 45); Richmond, California
- Listed height: 6 ft 3 in (1.91 m)
- Listed weight: 195 lb (88 kg)

Career history
- San Diego Sabers (2004–2015); Las Vegas Fightin' Fury (2021-Present)

Awards and highlights
- / Round: 1 / Pick: 1: All Star Game (2007) (2008) (2009); Championship Game MVP (2008); Championship Playoffs (2012)

- Malik El Debarge Wright-Mack is played by Hosea Chanchez. Malik is a high-profile athlete and the starting quarterback the Sabers. He has the reputation of being an arrogant, rich, womanizing pro athlete. He now lives in his own mansion in San Diego and once lived with his mother, who was his manager.

Malik was born to Tasha Mack when she was in high school in Richmond, California. As a child, he did not know his father. His best friend since childhood is Terrance "Tee Tee" Carter. Malik attended Richmond High School, Richmond, California and led the football team to a Conference Championship state title. With the San Diego Sabers, he won his first Championship and was named MVP in 2008. In season 2, after an embarrassing scandal where he punches a public figure who uses a wheelchair, he fires Tasha as his manager. He falls in love with actress Robin Givens and convinces her to marry him as a publicity stunt. In the third season, he finally meets his father and his half sister, Pucci, whom he tries to help with her singing career.

Two years later, Malik is still a cocky, spoiled playboy who is sleeping with the wife of the Sabers' new owner, Roger Keith. It is discovered that Malik's back was injured during the last season; he blames his injury on Keith, who decided to get a better defense to help win games versus getting a good offensive line to protect Malik. As revenge, he is having an affair with the owner's wife. Tee-Tee, his childhood friend and former assistant, is now his own boss and Malik has yet to replace him. However, Malik still treats Tee-Tee as if he is his personal assistant. Tee-Tee puts his foot down telling Malik he needs to get a new assistant and stop calling on him to fix his problems. Malik gets arrested after looking for Tee-Tee one night for assaulting a cop after being pulled over for drunk driving. After advisement from several people (including his mother) and some resistance, Malik decides to go to rehab for his drug problems. He later admits that he was just there for a good Public Relations (PR). Malik figures out how to get rid of Parker, but his plan backfires when she tells her husband that she was sleeping with him. The result is an end to their marriage. He goes to rehab after issues. He then tries to help his girlfriend who into drugs and alcohol. In season 5, Malik attempts to rekindle his relationship with Jenna but is unable to because of relapse. He also is getting used to his role as the backup quarterback. Malik also has to deal with the different lifestyle that he is forced to live now that he is no longer the superstar quarterback. Malik's financial woes force him to sell his mansion, get rid of most his cars, and move back in with Tasha as a way to get his life on track. His friendship with Derwin has also been damaged because of Derwin's push to get Malik benched. Later, Malik and Derwin rekindle their friendship and campaign to have Malik replace Kwan because of his inability to get Derwin the ball. In the episode "Derwin about to go H.A.M.", after Kwan is injured, Malik steps in to replace him and leads the Sabers on a historical comeback win. In the final episode of Season 5, he appears to have gone back to his old habits by breaking up with Jenna. While talking to his new sex interest, he purchases expensive things.

Malik reaches a breakthrough in a therapy session with his mother. He has never had a chance to express himself due to Tasha's domineering behavior and their codependency on one another. The therapist also forces him to stand up to his mother and "grow up". Before he leaves, Malik reassures his love to his mother. He winds up in a rivalry with rapper Franko (Rico Ball) after the latter discovers that he has been sexting Tori, and ultimately winds up being brutally beaten and injured by Franko and a group of men who presumably had their women stolen by Malik. Some time later, Malik is depressed and intent on revenge against Franko, but after a conversation with his mother in which she reveals that he is about to become a big brother, he seems to have given this up.

In season 10 (season 1 paramount+), Malik moved to Las Vegas along with his mother, and sister Khai. He was positioned to become owner of the Las Vegas Fightin' Fury but was persuaded to play quarterback for another year by the owner of the team. During this time his ego is tested where he also deals with inner demons he battled from his past dealing with an unresolved mental health issue. His past college teammate friend Caleb Jones was killed as a result from a football injury caused by Malik and now appears in spirit around him serving as his conscious. Malik was forced later to make peace with his past. Also Malik dealt with unresolved issues of having a normal relationship with his mother, Tasha in which the two begin clashing with one another surrounding his concerns. The colonel gave Malik an ultimatum offer to have ownership of the team instead of playing quarterback by testing his loyalty for the team against his mother. In which he later rejected by pursuing the team to take a strike. A few days later (season 2 paramount+) after learning the truth of his mother possibly losing everything against the colonel, he meets with him to make a new offer by taking back his protest having the team to continue playing in hopes his mother keeps her agency. However the 1,400 members of the football union stood in support of Malik resulting in the entire league to strike out, leaving the colonel to acquire the agency under 'Thatcher Holdings' and replace Tasha Mack immediately from her agency with Candice Ross, a

In season 11 (season 2 paramount+), Malik dealt with his mental health by attending art therapy, he slowly take interest in her but she omitted his advances being it breaches the therapist/patient contract agreement. In a turnaround of events he learns that Colonel Thatcher died in a plane crash which led the Fightin' Fury in limbo giving the title to his son before they recruit a new owner. This made Malik hopeful to persuade Tasha to regaining her agency back, but she rather was no longer interested. He stood on his word on the strike with his players but soon realizes a betrayal from their teammate Jamison began to stir the pot. He was surprised to come across Shannon, a past teenage date of his who now is working against his mother. He often revisited thoughts of seeing her in the past as well as made attempts to visit her in person present day where she resides in St. Louis, but couldn't do it until he was faced to deal with her in person pushing his curiosity as to why their relationship never worked out. He soon realizes his true love for her as they worked with each another on a charity sponsoring a young pre-teen Zoya. After realizing his true feelings towards Shannon in a final therapy session, he then makes further plans to make it official with Shannon. He later prepares for Tee-Tee's wedding becoming his best man, but goes on an apology tour about his past dealings of every woman he ever had sexual relations with including Tee-Tee's so he can rid his past and move forward cleansing himself for his love of Shannon. Tasha was against this method as she tried to find distractions for Malik so he wouldn't fall in love with her opponent not realizing something more sinister was at hand. He later learns by overhearing that Tasha withheld information regarding the two lovebirds past as Tasha had paid off teenage Shannon $5,000 to get an abortion so that Malik has a chance at the future to play college and pro-football. This became another obstacle straining their mother-son relationship. He confront her about her selfish ideology after Tasha Mack becomes Owner of The Fightin' Fury by default after learning Eugene, a billionaire friend to the Colonel made racist remarks in thatcher Hotel with Malik regarding owning the Fightin' Fury. To which she tried to ransom him out of it but he quickly favored her into the position instead, granting her the part owner title with Garret's father Nelson Evans.

In an after credits scene of the season 11/(2) finale, Malik exposes the elevator surveillance video that Tasha express to him was deleted in a revenge payback towards his mother.

=== Jason Pitts ===
Jason Pitts
- The Game character
- First appearance: "The Game"
- Portrayed by: Coby Bell

In-universe information
- Nicknames: Pittsy, P, Cap, Jay; Powder, Lemon Head; Heady Riley; Max Headroom, Casper; Yellow Devil; Rock Head
- Title: Captain of the San Diego Sabers
- Occupation: Football player
- Spouses: Kelly Pitts (wife); Chardonnay Pitts (divorced)
- Significant other: Camille (ex-girlfriend)
- Children: Brittany Pitts
- Relatives: Thomas Pitts (father); Maria Pitts (mother)
- Quote frequently used: "Hey-O" "I brought this city a championship"
- Famously Known for: "Dip and Pitts" (The Pittsy Shuffle)

- Jason Pitts is portrayed by Coby Bell. Jason is the husband of Kelly Pitts, father of Brittany Pitts, and retired captain of the Sabers. He starts off as a franchise player and perennial pro-bowler along with QB Malik Wright in season 1. In season 2 when Kelly admitted to marrying him for the money, he eventually admits that he married Kelly because she was easy to impress and that he knew Kelly would worship him. Jason also begins using steroids because of his declining performance on the field. The steroids eventually make his performance better, but he quits when Kelly takes Brittany and leaves. After he and Kelly cannot reconcile their marriage, Jason and Kelly agree to a divorce in season 3. In the season three finale, Jason goes to court for hitting Kelly's ex-boyfriend, and after being released, leaves with his girlfriend Camille in the court room, rather than Kelly. He is single at the beginning of season 4. Jason is also holding out at the start of training camp in season 4, demanding that he gets a better contract, while filling in as a guest sports announcer. He would later get cut by the Sabers & become a reporter on a sports talk show with former NBA star Chris Webber. In Season 5, Jason married African-American bartender Chardonnay Brooks Pitts (portrayed by Brandy Norwood) during a drunken Mexican weekend, and remained married to her to pursue a romantic relationship. Additionally, by season 5 Jason had moved on from his show with Chris Webber and headlined his own sports talk show called The Pitts Stop. In season six, Jason rejoins the Sabers after impressing them at training camp. However, he and Chardonnay begin to have relationship problems when Chardonnay becomes involved in Tasha's love triangle, which he eventually discovers. He then confronts Tasha and basically tells her off. Their problems worsen after Jason gets a concussion and is still intent on playing football, which causes Chardonnay to move out. However, he eventually decides to retire for good, and he and Chardonnay reconcile. At his retirement ceremony, his past with steroids comes back to haunt him when he is approached by a reporter. When Kelly returns, Jason discovers that he is still in love with her and ultimately reveals this during his vow renewal ceremony, much to the shock of all the guests, including Chardonnay and even Kelly herself. Chardonnay then slaps him and leaves him at the altar, possibly ending their marriage. In the season 8 premiere, Jason tries to explain the situation to Kelly, who calls him disgusting. At the end of the episode, Chardonnay decides to divorce Jason and sue him for emotional cruelty, but ultimately drops the lawsuit and leaves town. However, in the season finale, she swears revenge on Jason and vows to return to San Diego, meaning she will become the main antagonist in the ninth and final season. On the plus side, Jason becomes interim head coach for the Sabers. He also remarries Kelly in the second episode of the ninth season. Jason was born to a pro football player, Thomas Pitts and his wife, Maria Pitts. As a child, he moved around a lot because his father blew all of his money and was traded frequently. Because of that Jason became very frugal, which was one of the problems that eventually led to his marriage's demise. He was selected by the Sabers as a first round Draft Pick, was a 7-time Pro Bowler, and helped the Sabers win the Championship Game in 2008. In season 10 (season 1 paramount+), he was revealed to be the head coach for the San Diego Sabers. he was also inducted into the hall of fame. He continues to bond with his daughter Brittany.

=== Kelly Pitts ===
Kelly Pitts
- The Game character
- First appearance: "The Game" (Backdoor Pilot) (Girlfriends - episode 6.18)
- Last appearance: "Pow Pow Pow"
- Portrayed by: Jennifer Baxter(2006) Brittany Daniel (2006–2015)

In-universe information
- Nicknames: Kel, K-Styles, Drunky
- Occupation: Sports Agent Assistant For Tasha Mack Management; Later For ISM (Irv Smiff Management)
- Spouse: Jason Pitts (husband)
- Significant others: Roman (ex-boyfriend); Joe (ex-boyfriend)
- Children: Brittany Pitts (daughter)
- Relatives: Mother; Stepfather; Brandon (brother)
- Origin: Reseda, Los Angeles

- Kelly Pitts (née Platski) was initially played by Jennifer Baxter, who was replaced by Brittany Daniel. Kelly is married to Sabers captain and star wide receiver Jason Pitts, mother of Brittany Pitts, and ex-President of the Sunbeams. In season 1, Kelly revealed that she had a trailer park upbringing. She was originally a cheerleader for the San Diego Sabers, where she met and eventually married Jason Pitts.

In season 2, Jason begins using steroids. Jason at first tries to hide his secret from Kelly, but after a couple of ugly situations, he can no longer do it and confesses. Kelly forces Jason to promise he will stop using in two months, or she will take Brittany and leave. After Jason refuses to stop 2 months later, Kelly follows through on her promise and leaves. After Jason quits, they later go to therapy where Kelly tells Jason she married him for his money. In the second-season finale, Kelly leaves Jason after he tries to use her to get a contract, and in season 3 they eventually agree to a divorce. When Jason's lawyers advise him to take full custody of their only child Brittany, Kelly blackmails Jason by threatening to reveal his secret of steroid use. During season three, she dates a couple of guys (bartender Joe and gym owner Roman). In the end, she hoped that her and Jason would get back together. Jason instead leaves with his girlfriend Camille (played by Stacey Dash), which leaves Kelly heartbroken.

At the start of season 4, it is revealed that Kelly is now a reality TV star, with her own show centered around the ex-wives of professional athletes. Sporting a new look & attitude, Kelly declares to Jason that she "won" in the divorce because she is spending the money he is earning and she believes she got more out of the divorce material wise. She starts to turn off her friends with the reality show (the cameras constantly following her), and her life starts to spiral out of control. She leaves Jason to take Brittany back and to remind her that he is the reason for her show in the first place. With her life unraveling, Kelly decides to quit her show and leave town to redefine her identity outside the football world.

Kelly returned in season 7. Upon her return, she reconnects with Jason, Brittany and Tasha, but Chardonnay is not so keen on this (at first). She and Jason share a kiss, which then brings back old feelings for Jason. Kelly and Chardonnay eventually bond. In season 9, she and Jason remarry.

In season 10 (season 1 Paramount) Kelly is mentioned that she left to Boca to care for her sick mother, she has been trying to reach out to Brittany, but she never answered her phone.

=== Brittany Pitts ===
Brittany Pitts
- The Game & The Game (2021) character
- First appearance: "The Game" Pilot Episode (Girlfriends)
- Portrayed by: Erica Gluck (Seasons 1–3); Katlynn Simone (Seasons 4–9); Adriyan Rae (Season 10–present)

In-universe information
- Nicknames: Brit-Brat, Pumpkin, Little Girl, That's So Raven, Raven Symone, New School
- Occupation: Executive assistant (Tasha Mack Sports Agency); Hostess at Club End Zone
- Affiliation: Florida A&M University (withdraw status)
- Significant other: Jamison Fields (Boyfriend)
- Relatives: Jason Pitts (Father); Kelly Pitts (Mother); Tasha Mack (God Aunt)

- Brittany Olive Pitts (first portrayed by Erica Gluck), is the only child born to Jason and Kelly Pitts. She was first introduced in the series as a 2 color toned (Blond & Black mixed) hair girl who often had struggles with her hair being she is mixed raced. Her mother Kelly often had issues combing and brushing her hair as she was not aware and knowledgeable of maintaining hair of someone who was of African American descent. Her parents often Nicknamed her "Brit-Brat" or simply "Brit", while Jason normally bonded with her as 'daddy's little girl' and called her "Pumpkin". Tasha Mack, who became her 'God Aunt' over the years would refer to her by many names (reminiscent of the in-universe Girlfriends character Toni Childs who called Maya's son Jabari many names), she called Brittany names throughout the years such as: "Little Girl", "That's So Raven", "Cheap Raven Symone" (due to her resemblance to her as a teen), and as an adult she called her "New School" (reminiscent to Melanie's nickname "Med School", also given by Tasha). Brittany's character as a child was very innocent and sweet, but was often spoiled by her parents. Her parents try to avoid her from becoming in the middle of their personal discrepancies, there were a few times where Jason and Kelly as well as Jason parents would get into disagreements and they would have to cover her ears or shield her away from the issue. But during Jason's steroid use, Kelly ran off with Brit-Brat for an undisclosed 'girls weekend', so they can escape him.

In Season 4-9 Brittany's character is now seen as an adolescent, (portrayed by Katlynn Simone) with her hair now fully naturally black. During those years, she began to develop a rebellious behavior by making smart remarks and outbursting snooty attitudes as a result of Jason and Kelly's divorce. She began clashing with her parents often by arguments and rebuttals, as well as becoming smart mouthed with Tasha Mack who challenged her (in the episode, "Whip it...Whip it Good") when she was offered to watch over Brit while Jason went golfing with Magic Johnson. Brittany was accused of stealing medical marijuana from out of Tasha Mack's purse as Jason then came to her defense, but was later revealed she did in fact steal it. She explained she was going to sell it to a friend for profit. This wasn't her first time being accused of stealing, in season 3 (episode: "Just the Three of Us") Jason's father believed Brit-Brat stole 5 dollars from him in which later she reveal she did, it is also the same episode where both Jason and Kelly reveal to Brittany they were getting a divorce. She began to resent her mother after leaving resulting her living with her dad and building a relationship with her father's new wife Chardonnay which was a fickle relationship. She also build much frustration against Tasha Mack as she would try to demean her and her age. She began sneaking around kissing a flirting with boys as she was trying to match up with her teenage growth. She eventually worked out her anger with her mother.

In Season 10 (season 1 paramount+), six years later after the events of season 9, Brittany (now portrayed by Adriyan Rae) graduated from college, and became independent living in a high rise loft in Miami. She was well popular with a group of college friends calling their pact "828", which was created by her and her friend Raquel. The crew normally would hang out at her condo. She quickly found herself becoming audited owing a ton of money and must surrender her possessions as her condo is in foreclosure. She decided to relocate to Las Vegas to start a new life rooming with her past college friend of the '828' pact, Raquel, who is an aspiring musician that works as a waitress a local club, Joint 51. Brittany tries to dodge the IRS collectors who were investigating her at a casino and was met with an ultimatum when she got caught. By luck and chance she ran into Tasha Mack who was able to help the restitution. Brittany later revealed the reason she was in debt and Tasha offered her a job to work for her sports agency as 'executive assistant' while keeping the debt a secret from her parents. Kelly, (who is only mentioned in this season) makes attempts to call Brittany on multiple occasion, but Brittany ignores the calls.

During her occupation with Tasha Mack Agency, she met a troubling aspiring football player, Jamison Fields who gradually takes an interest in her, but later finds herself immersed in her feelings for him as she cared for him. They start to have a building relationship and was caught off-guard by Jason Pitts when he came to Las Vegas. He felt that Jamison wasn't a fit for her because of him being a football player and it's wasn't the life her wanted for her. She also came across an issue with Jamison that resembles her father's past as he secretly took cortisone steroids to help with his ankle injury. Brit-Brat is very entrepreneurial as she took her independence to pitch and launch Club End Zone at the Viacom Stadium to the colonel as a way to make advancements for him and his players alike, secretly putting Tasha Mack in the middle owning the club, this creates a new trust issue between them which in turn resulted in Tasha terminating her. Afterwards she went through a brief crisis trying to avoid her problems by running from them leaving town. She comes back and gets hired at Club End Zone as a hostess, where she had a chance encounter with Jamison's ex, Allison who was the result of him going to jail in the past.

In Season 11 (season 2 paramount+) it is revealed in a prequel episode that the friendship between her and Raquel started after learning they slept with the same guy Xavier Mitchell, who is owner of 'Clutch Vodka' as they teamed up to ransom him after firing them. They all were college mates. The two initially didn't get along and expressed their dislike for each other by insulting nicknames for each other "fake ass Kim Khardashian" (Brittany) and "Ghetto J. Lo" (Raquel). Brittany was apparently still having thieving ways as Xavier called her behavior out against her.

A few days later she was faced to understand if Jamison was still in love with her, to which he professed it. She also gained Tasha's trust by pledging allegiance to her agency with her loyalty and secretly got Rick Fox to help Tasha in hopes to save the agency. She became curious of Jamison's moves as his behavior became more suspicious while they embarked on a camping trip.

== BET revival main characters ==
Bryce Westbrook
- The Game character
- First appearance: The Blueprint (season 6, episode 1)
- Last appearance: Pow Pow Pow (season 9, episode 10)
- Portrayed by: Jay Ellis

In-universe information
- Full name: Bryce Westbrook
- Alias: Blueprint
- Nicknames: Blue; Blues Clues; Little Boy Blue; Blueberry
- Occupation: Football player
- Significant other: Keira Whitaker (girlfriend - relationship ended)
- Relatives: Colonel Westbrook (father) U.S. Army

Bryce Westbrook
No. 1 – San Diego Sabers
- Position: Wide receiver

Personal information
- Listed height: 6 ft 3 in (1.91 m)

Career information
- College: Stanford University

Career history
- Stanford University (Quarterback); Pop Warner football league

=== Bryce Westbrook ===
- Bryce 'Blueprint' Westbrook (portrayed by Jay Ellis) is a 2013 Pro-football draft pick quarterback and wide receiver from Stanford University who was initially a 1st round draft picked by Baltimore, and then traded into the San Diego Sabers replacing MVP Receiver Derwin Davis switching him to the team in Baltimore. His personality comes off arrogant as he greets his new team. His father who served in the military, tends to make controlling decisions for him. He bumps into former child actress Keira Whitaker who challenges his ego about being famous. She frames his image by kissing him to get the media to make him more famous than he is by seeming to be romantically involved with her. He then becomes approached by Derwin Davis who was furious about the change. The two gets into a bloody fight, and is catered emotionally by Keira when she meets him in his hotel room. He sneaks off into the night with Keira's friend Ciara, to which the next morning was revealed. Bryce begins to build a growing interest in Keira instantly. He unknowingly moves into the building where she resides and begins taunting her every chance he gets. During training camp, he struggles with being accepted into the team, due to his poor performance. His rookie status becomes reality to him as the team begins hazing him in multiple ways. He eventually gets his payback pulling off pranks on his teammates. And the cycle continued with the hazing, until Jason Pitts came to his side to set him straight on how to conduct himself as team and not an independent becoming his mentor. Blue takes note by making fun of himself in their team's rookie's talent show. After a night of getting intoxicated from a bet he made with Keira they share an authentic kiss and began 'kissing friends', however he feels he desires more out of this so called 'situationship'. Eventually they finally shared their first intimate moment after he helped her rehearse lines for an audition she was going for. Keira told him days later that she was a virgin and this affected him as he felt that was important to know. They had a disagreement over it where they agreed to separate. He avoids her for weeks and begins to live a free lifestyle while the struggle of understanding why Keira never shared with him about being a virgin. He witness her becoming interested in another guy she works with and its strikes his jealousy. He later works it out with Keira and they began to start dating again. He starts to believe crazy superstitions that circulated that might distract his play, this becomes an issue for Keira. His father the Colonel pays a visit and has strong words for Bryce disapproving his choices, but Bryce stands up to his father defending himself. This brings him back closer to Keira. He is challenged when Keira reveals to him on the premiere night of her movie 'Baggers' that she shares a steamy romantic scene with Luke. She warns him to walk away and be distracted but he curiously watches it from afar feeling ashamed. He questioned her to know the truth if they ever been sexually active to which she didn't deny, he walks away. But was brought back together when Malik got involved in a brutal altercation. They later decided to separate again on Keira's behalf.

In season 7, the two seem to build tension within each other as they try to call out each other's every move while Bryce starts to find it difficult to be attached to Keira's entertainment lifestyle. Dealing with Keira's erratic behavior he fought an officer outside of a hotel defending her and was arrested. The judged ordered him to serve community service. Their relation continues to get fickle after and they decided to try to keep their situation-ship private, but couldn't keep it a secret any longer by revealing it in front of everyone saying they're in love again, to which no one cared. The two start to spend more quality time with each other when Keira spends multiple nights in his apartment. He suggests Keira to move in with him. They struggle once again to remain solid as a couple. Early in the day of Chardonnay's wedding Bryce proposed to Keira.

In season 8, The two ran off to celebrate on a private jet and the question came up again about the new film Keira was starring in that he didn't agree with. He expressed wanting to have a regular life with his wife. Back on the field, Bryce gets into a disagreement with Jason Pitts who became coach of the Sabers. Jason takes his anger out on Blue from his private situations. He got an opportunity to act with Keira on a Snickers commercial she was supposed to star in, but the final cut promotes him more than Keira. Bryce 'Blue' Westbrook becomes captain of the Sabers. After multiple winning streaks, he starts to get luck on the field and Tasha Mack takes interest in managing him asking to become his agent, but he declines. He defends Tasha after she was approached about breast feeding in public and it went viral over the internet blogs, resulting in changing his mind later to agree to a trial run as her client. Blue starts to become suspicious of Keira and Malik assuming they are already having sex. He challenges his theory by testing them putting them in multiple scenarios setting them up to react off each other. He finally calls her out and admits to what his mission was.

In Season 9, Bryce notices that Keira is at the hotel with Malik, he waits for them to enter the elevator and attacks Malik. Blue packs to move out. Friction boils between him and Malik on the field, they fight resulting in Malik suspension. Blue gives away her engagement ring to a homeless man. Jason tries to bring them together for a mediation session but it fails. Aside from the relationship issues, Bryce steps up to control serious situations within the Sabers public discrepancies. After not following the protocol he gets suspended from the team, and then gets arrested after his protest. He gets a nonsense pep talk from Jason. He moves into a new condo and talks with Keira and they rekindle a final love connection before she leaves San Diego for good. During the playoffs game, he puts Malik out on the field despite his difference, they win the game. Months later he and Malik leads the Sabers into victory winning the Super Bowl Championship. His story ends being tricked into signing with Irv Smiff Management becoming his client without Tasha Mack's knowledge.

=== Keira Whitaker ===
Keira Whitaker
- The Game character
- First appearance: The Blueprint (season 6, episode 1)
- Last appearance: Pow Pow Pow (season 9, episode 10)
- Portrayed by: Lauren London

In-universe information
- Full name: Keira Michelle Whitaker
- Nicknames: Dimples; Sidekick Dimples (by Tasha); Melanie pt. II (by Tasha)
- Occupation: Actress
- Affiliation: Choice Artist Talent Agency (Client); Brian (her agent)
- Significant others: Blue Westbrook (relationship ended); Luke (co-star and brief date); Malik Wright (brief date)

- Keira Michelle Whitaker (portrayed by Lauren London) is an actress who was a former child star, known for her catchphrase "...and why wasn't I invited". She meets with filmmaker John Singleton in hopes of breaking the mold of being a wholesome little girl. However John only met with her as a favor to her agent but is not interested in casting her for his upcoming project, he felt her acting isn't as believable. He makes an offer to give her an extra role if she persuades her agent to go on a date with him. After consulting with her friends, she bumps into the prideful egotistical Bryce 'Blueprint' Westbrook, who just won 1st draft pick into the San Diego Sabers who was familiar with her. Being annoyed that he was the reason she didn't get the part in John Singleton's new movie because he was distracted with watching his draft pick selection, she gets even by stealing a kiss, while paparazzi's snaps and records the interaction framing his new identity as being romantically involved as a couple. She becomes jealous after her friend Ciara spends the night with him. Bryce eventually moves into her building taunting her indirectly. Rumors of infidel about Bryce circulate at a charity function which Keira overhears from a woman name Angela who wants her share of him. Bryce was a participant in the auction for a date, and Keira competes with her in a bidding war, she ultimately wins biding $75,000. They go on a date that turns disastrously on Keira's behalf. Tasha Mack and the president of the 'Sunbeams' approached Keira and pressured her to join as an idea to help Bryce with his performance anxiety on the field by providing support assuming they are dating. Hesitant at first, she starts to take on the challenge to support him by standing by his side. She officially becomes a new member of the 'Sunbeams' along with Chardonnay Pitts, who is married to Jason Pitts, who just got offered a position back into the Sabers. She continues to deny being in a relationship with Bryce quoting it as being 'just friends', to which Tasha Mack calls out claiming she's too uptight and reminds her of the past Sunbeam Melanie Barnett-Davis, who played it off behaving too proper. The members begin testing her bringing her out of character, with Chardonnay defending her. At a sponsored event Blue made a bet with her that anytime someone calls them a couple they would have to take a shot, resulting in them becoming intoxicated and later sharing an authentic kiss. The behavior continues weeks later as she only considered themselves 'kissing friends' but Blue rather develops more with her. At the next sunbeam meeting, she tries to denounce her membership from the sunbeams feeling that her growing relationship is getting too personal, and unsure if she really wants him being as she is a virgin. She expressed her desire to have someone support her dreams rather put more effort in someone else. She continued to push her limits seeking auditions for TV/film finding it hard to make connections and securing roles. Bryce helps her out with her lines leading them to have their first intimate moment, where she lost her virginity. Bryce was unaware of her virginity resulting in him feeling violated and angry. Keira speak out against him feeling as if she gave her all and he didn't deserve her body, She then calls the romantic encounter off. Malik defends Bryce and speaks his mind to Keira. She decided to reach out weeks later in hopes to talk, but Bryce doesn't return her calls. But finally gets his attention when she visits him at his apartment intoxicated. Trying to find her own chance at love, she goes on a brief date with her co-star of her movie 'Baggers Luke. She does this indirectly to make Blue jealous. Her friend Ciara calls out Blue during a photoshoot which strains both relationships between her and Bryce. She gives into Blue to get back with him, but learns he's occupied with multiple women and resolves by stating they will become an official relationship from there on.

On her premiere night of the film she starred in 'Baggers', she confessed to Blue that she had a steamy romantic scene with Luke, which startled him. He pressured her to know if they ever had sexual relations in reality which she couldn't deny. They split again but was quickly brought back together when Malik was hospitalized, they tried to find a resolution to their relationship, but ultimately she lets him go. Over the few weeks after, they continue to have disagreements while in their separate ways. Her intoxicated behavior gets Bryce caught up with the law after he fought a security officer. She continues to show up around him, getting him in more trouble. She once again confess she wants to reconcile and make their relationship work. They sneak around keeping the relationship secret but confesses it to be revealed to everyone at Jason's and Chardonnay's house to which everyone already knew and cared less. She stayed with him after accidentally starting a fire in her apartment. Building a bond overtime, Bryce asked her to move in with him and she kept her apartment. She gets a new role in a Woody Allen movie called "Three Nannies" and shares the news with everyone but Bryce became angered to not know that she haven't shared that with him first.

Bryce proves his love by proposing to Keira on the morning of Chardonnay's wedding day, leaving the ceremony. The escape to a private jet where they eventually face issues again, surrounding the Woody Allen film. She learns that he wants to control the relationship by only having his wife by his side and she disagrees about not having her own life to live. Months later they do a Snickers commercial together, leaving Bryce to outshine Keira when it was meant for her. She begins to believe acting isn't the right fit for her because she hasn't have great luck. She tries for another audition and fails again. Keira takes on a actor's workshop class and brings Malik along for the help to act with her. The scene required them to kiss and left the two in awe of each other. they start building a friendlier connection over the next for weeks, which they begin to feel guilty over. They start to slowly indirectly gain attraction over each other which Blue catches onto, and test them. She later argues with Blue after he calls her out. Keira would later visit Malik and they both confessed to liking one another after being aware of Blue knowing, and decided to keep their new fling on the low. They leave the hotel in secret, but was approach by Blue who attacked Malik in the elevator. She comes home to Bryce moving out and later sought out support from Tasha. After days of fighting between Malik and Bryce, she walks in on them having another argument and overhears Malik disrespecting her, she later decides to ignore and avoid him. While hanging out with a friend, she hears Malik's voicemail begging for her back. Keira found herself becoming the center of attention accidentally walking into the Sunbeams meeting where everyone including Tasha took turns scolding her for being with 2 men, she defends herself. Malik pays her a visit where, Keira tells him about the voicemail and acknowledges that she want to give the date a try. They go out and is distracted by multiple woman throwing themselves at Malik, Blue shows up at the bar they're at and she tries to talk to him to help him with his other troubles. Tasha catches Malik and Keira post physical intimacy and tries to break them up. Malik decides for it was best for them to break up, this angers Keira and she breaks up with him. She pays a visit to Bryce in his new condo to wish Blue well. Malik meets with Keira after winning the playoff to surprise her with an audition and pushes to win her heart. She reveals she slept with Blue, Malik doesn't give up as he purposes to her, she declines and leave San Diego for good.

Keira story ends with her finally becoming successful at her acting dreams, becoming a lead actress in Transformers 5: The Return of Skid and Mudflap opposite Michael B. Jordan, it became her breakout role. Albeit sources claim the two developed a romantic relationship after the film, she doesn't confirm or deny the rumors.

=== Chardonnay Pitts ===
Chardonnay Pitts
- The Game character
- First appearance: Skeletons (season 5, episode 1)
- Last appearance: Pow Pow Pow (season 9, episode 10)
- Portrayed by: Brandy Norwood

In-universe information
- Full name: Chardonnay Pitts
- Nicknames: 'Char', Char-Char "Miss little drop bar" (by Tasha)
- Occupation: Club bartender Owner of Spadonnay
- Affiliation: BFA. - Communications (Florida A&M University)
- Family: Father (foreman supervisor at General Motors) Mother (Fresno school district secretary) 1 brother (incarcerated)
- Spouse: Jason Pitts (Divorced)
- Significant other: Roger Keith Jr. (brief date)
- Origin: Fresno, California

- Chardonnay Pitts (portrayed by Brandy) is a sassy ghetto-behaving bartender in San Diego. Her character was introduced as a recurring role in season 5 before becoming main cast in season 7. On one evening while working her night shift at the bar, Jason Pitts rudely and bluntly demeans her to make him a cocktail. The two exchange harsh words with each other, which he sends for her manager to report her. This leads to her getting terminated. Jason continues to heckle her when he finds her outside in the rain, but Chardonnay is greatly upset with him that he did that. Jason changes his tune sympathizing with her and tries to make up getting her fired and pleas he'll do anything to restitute for it. Chardonnay takes his offer by leading him to Taco Bell after he forgot his coupons when they arrived at Chili's. Jason suggests that he could get better tacos in Tijuana, Mexico to which they later went, unknowingly on his behalf after getting intoxicated over their conversation while he rambled about loving black women, to which she acquiesced. He then unknowingly marries her, waking up the next morning surprised and lost. She expressed that she would rather get the marriage annulled when they get back to San Diego based on his nonsense actions and prejudice towards Black women. When they arrive back, he helps to get her job back and days later she encourages him to meet her friends Shawnda (Tiffany Haddish), Darius (Kel Mitchell) and Adisa where they share the black experience to get him to open his eyes to understanding his own background. They share their first kiss after he comes to her job in frustration of experiencing the downsides of being Black. Jason slowly takes interest in her and began to feel they shouldn't get an annulment, but Chardonnay still disagrees, believing they are both in different places in their life. He confesses that he wants to be with only her assuring he is willing to learn how to be a better man and accept what it means to be Black. They come across issues when Chardonnay starts to feel insecure over white women that may sway Jason's interest back, especially at work. Chardonnay also committed to not having sexual relations with him until she knows that the alleged fake marriage is real. She later meets with Tasha Mack to seek advice of when to fold in spite of her insecurities to which she tells Chardonnay to be a 'honey badger' and go for it. She then makes attempts to give in to him setting the mood, but Jason double back to call it quits. She began to express that being difficult was a way to protect herself and vowed to be ready and available for him. Weeks later, Chardonnay suggests that she should meet all of Jason's friends. She puts together a mixer without acknowledging Jason. Melanie greets her but claims her loyalty remains with his first wife Kelly but opens to being friendly. Summer, his co-worker learns that he is married during the mixer. Jason expressed his disappointment in Chardonnay's action once the guest left, but quickly made up.

Chardonnay put away savings for her dream beauty bar called 'Spadonnay', which resulted in the utilities being shut off, Jason made efforts to help her out despite her dismissing it. She also had another side hustle braiding hair to make the money to add to the savings. Chardonnay seemed to prove herself to be independent while Jason wanted to be her savior, this cause friction between them. Back at work, multiple men flirt with her and this draws Jason to become jealous. She pressures him to understand that she only show attention in order to obtain tips which will lead to building more funds to purchase Spadonnay. He scares them away to secure her as his profess his love to her once again, however gets cold feet again days later serving her annulment papers. To add insult to injury, she finds herself in the same predicament when she first met Jason as a patron at the bar gets aggressive with her and gets her fired. Struggling to get through the day, she rides the bus home but is sidelined by the bus driver who detoured at the request of Jason orders. She gets off the bus and attacks Jason who surprised her giving her the keys the store front 'Spadonnay' and officially proposes to her. They later celebrate the Sabers championship win at a club along with Malik, Melanie and Derwin and announce staying married.

In Season 6, she tries to build a relationship with Jason's daughter, Brittany Pitts, but it begins with a rough start. They have a conversation about college and she shares with Britt about other life options and goals and reveal that school isn't for everyone and uses herself as an example of the end results revealing that she has outstanding student loans, of which Jason becomes very suspicious. She also starts opening herself more about her life upon Jason's curiosity. Which in turn leads her to be suspicious about his life too as he claimed he had a vasectomy. She expressed her anger because she wants children and learned he possibly avoided her from having any. This pushes her to give him an ultimatum for their marriage, but they come to agreement to find solutions. She became a confidant to Tasha Mack, who sought out relationship advice of her secretive fling with Rick Fox. She later would become a new member of the 'Sunbeams' after Jason Pitts was offered a position back into the Sabers. She joins along with new member Keira who is an actress that is unofficially dating Bryce 'Blue' Westbrook. She finds herself being lowly compared the Kelly, but uses her voice to lead the pack. Chardonnay fights one of the members after revealing she had sex with Jason in the past.

Chardonnay and Tasha often get into playful banter as she always play middle man to Tasha's romantical problems. Jason begins to assume that Chardonnay is having an affair with Rick Fox being that she is always either around him or on the phone with him not knowing she was defending Tasha Mack. He confronts Tasha about learning Chardonnay was in the middle of their relationship which turned into a physical altercation with Pookie which the truth comes out. Chardonnay and Jason begins to have multiple disagreements after the event due to Jason's mistrust in her. Weeks later, at work in Spadonnay she was challenged by Tasha Mack that she would be controlled by Jason like Kelly Pitts once was. She became concerned herself to find her voice after Jason's behavior became evident and gained control of both Tasha and Jason assuring she is 'nobody's Kelly Pitts', taking back her independence. After Jason's injury he reveals to her that he once used steroids to cope with the pain. She gives Jason an ultimatum if he continues football she will leave him. He chooses football, and Chardonnay decides to exit the relationship moving in with Tasha Mack. On the night of Keira's movie premiere, they crossed paths after the film and exchanged heavy words. Malik's brutal accident brings them back together, and as Jason consoles her, he lends her his coat, just after which she finds a napkin letter to Kelly expressing his true love and regrets asking for forgiveness. She throws her wedding ring at him, he later finds her to tell her there was also another letter to her in the other pocket expressing his feeling for her as well, they make up.

By season 7, Chardonnay builds a strong relationship with Tasha, still residing with her. She learns that Tasha is pregnant and supports her. Back at home Chardonnay struggles with Brittany's behavior, and Kelly Pitts makes a surprise visit. She starts to fade into the shadows as Tasha reconnects with Kelly. Days later, Kelly helps out Jason and Britt in their situations which doesn't sit well with Chardonnay. She invites everyone over to help give Tasha an intervention about her pregnancy and affairs and speaks her mind how it affects her relationship between them and her marriage. Tasha deflects the situation by revealing to chardonnay he's been sneaking off to see Kelly. Days later, she along with Brittany kicked him out the house. Jason makes attempts to return to try and win her heart back. She eventually accepts his apology with the promises not to lie to each other, it leads him to confess that he kissed Kelly. In response, she sought revenge to kiss another man. In the middle of the attempt, he finds her to stop her, and proposes to her again, she still manages to still a kiss, but accepts the proposal feeling victorious. She starts to plan her wedding afterwards which create friction with Jason because of the financial budget. Chardonnay clears the air privately with Kelly to take control of her marriage. The wedding goes forth with multiple issues happening before the wedding, Tasha delivers the baby and Keira and Blue leaves the wedding to chase their own proposal. Kelly has a heart to heart with Chardonnay to continue. Jason confesses at the altar he's still in love with Kelly. She slaps him and storms out.

In season 8, Kelly tries to console Chardonnay at her home but they get into a fight. She later goes on a campaign to sell and burn his personal belongings, which Tasha pulls an intervention to find other avenues to hurt him. She pays him a visit to serve divorce papers with an added emotional-cruelty lawsuit. Chardonnay takes advantage of the situation by appearing on Perez Hilton's gossip talk show to tell her side of the story after her wedding slap-gate went viral. Chardonnay goes back to Jason to get the truth out of him where he confesses his truth that he felt she was never the right woman for him. Chardonnay continued to pursue her painful streak of winning over his finances accessing his bank accounts through investigating. Tasha tries to persuade her to stop and their friendship starts to cease. Chardonnay decides to quit the Sunbeams and her college sorority sister threw her a divorce freedom party. She meets a British guy at the party and has a fling with him, losing her wedding ring in the process. She attacks him with a taser assuming he stole it, however the ring was accidentally in a jar on the dresser. Tasha comes to her rescue and they reconcile their differences.

Chardonnay finally decided to drop the lawsuit and signed the divorce papers making it final, as she tells Tasha that she took her advice. She made the decision to leave San Diego for good, moving back to her hometown of Fresno to move on and start fresh. Weeks later, after watching the news coverage of Jason Pitts becoming the new head coach of the San Diego Sabers and announcing his family, Chardonnay, now living with her parents, anxiously yells to them that she's moving back to San Diego. Proving she hasn't gotten over the pain, now ready to seek revenge. She calls him to interrogate him to fish for information recording him, then seeks help from Tasha.to go live with Deborah Norville to expose him of his steroid use, but Jason beats her to it. She later learns he remarried Kelly, and confronts her about it. After seeking guidance from praying, she accidentally comes in contact with Kelly at Tasha's house over unfortunate circumstances where their behavior with each other became hot and cold. Tasha encourages her to let go of the past by deleting all Jason's pictures off her phone. She attempts to move on trying to date but gets catfished by Tee-Tee who helps her understand her next plan. She goes on a date with Roger, but realizes after 2 dates she's not ready to move on, however Roger thought it could have worked.

Chardonnay story ends in question if she decided to move back to Fresno, or stayed in San Diego.

== Paramount+ revival main characters ==
Raquel Navarro
- The Game (2021) character
- First appearance: "A Taste of Vegas" (Season 10, episode 1)
- Portrayed by: Analisa Velez

In-universe information
- Occupation: Waitress at Joint 51; Lounge singer (Joint 51)
- Affiliation: Florida A&M University (status unknown)
- Significant other: Garret Evans (boyfriend)

=== Raquel Navarro ===
- Raquel Navarro (portrayed by Analisa Velez -Season 10, season 1 Paramount+) is a close friend of Brittany Pitts. The two went to college together and was part of a pact called "828", which was created after a resolution from not getting along with each other and learning they slept with the same guy Xavier Mitchell, who is the owner of 'Clutch Vodka', where they both worked. She since moved from Florida to Las Vegas in hopes of chasing a dream in getting a record deal.as a songwriter and recording artist. In her off time she performs as a resident lounge singer for the club Joint 51 in which she works at as a waitress. She finally gets an opportunity in the season finale to perform the National Anthem for the opening Game at the Viacom Stadium. She dates Las Vegas Fightin' Fury player Garret Evans. The next day after singing the National Anthem she gains interests in a music executive Apollo Maze who offers her a recording contract and a $50,000 incentive. Days later while on a camping trip with Britt, Garrett and Jamison, she indirectly reveals a dark past about her life referring to an attacker as the 'animal". Garrett has been trying to learn more about her life and parents, but she's been keeping her relationship about her mother discreet for the time being describing it as complicated. She eventually reveals that her mother was incarcerated in the New York State Correctional Facility since she was 14 after learning Garret and his father ran a background check on her due to her consistency of being secretive with Garret, explaining she had trust issues. In her past she was a foster child who up to the present date constantly kept in touch with her and visiting her in at prison. This in turn led to Raquel briefly breaking up with Garrett after losing trust feeling betrayed. She tries to move on reminiscing over small details and memories of the things he did for her while explaining her new single "Soulmates". She visited her mother again at prison where her mother reveals she is getting an early release on parole for her good behavior, and needs support of her for a place to live. During her mother's court appearance for parole release, her mother pleas about the trauma she endured and why she acted out in self defense which reveals to Garret who secretly attends, questioning about what Raquel said during their camping trip about a scary story which seemed to be true. After the motion was put on hold, she is approached by Garret who makes effort in regaining her trust and later asks her about what really happened and was she herself responsible for the murder, the which she admits in montage sequences as they made up and reconcile their love for each other.

Garret Evans
- The Game (2021) character
- First appearance: A Taste of Vegas (Season 10, episode 1)
- Portrayed by: Toby Sandeman

In-universe information
- Nickname: Lenny Kravitz (by Tasha in 2017)
- Occupation: Football player
- Family: 1 brother (barrister); 1 sister (Neurosurgeon)
- Significant other: Raquel Navarro (Girlfriend)
- Relatives: Nelson Evans (father)
- Origin: England

=== Garret Evans ===
Garret Evans
No. 23 – Las Vegas Fightin' Fury
- Position: Defensive back

Career history
- St. Louis - Pro team (Previous); Las Vegas Fighting Fury (2021–present)

- Garret Evans (portrayed by Toby Sandeman - Season 10, season 1 Paramount+) is a 4 time all-pro & Defensive MVP of a previous team from St. Louis who was drafted to the Las Vegas Fighting Fury in 2017. He origins is from England. He's a high roller when it comes to his finances. Most of the advances came from the colonel who invested in him to join his team. but Garret was hesitant to settle because he wants to be the highest paid Defensive on the team. After joining the team, he becomes close with both Malik and Jameson. They build a small bond and brotherhood as the training camp for the Fightin' Fury began. During the development season he takes interest in Raquel Navarro, a close friend and collegemate of Brittany Pitts. They began dating instantly and tried to keep it low profile. He supports Raquel in her musical dreams. Jamison and Brittany eventually dates and joins Garrett and Raquel on double dates. The flame between the two grows strong over time. By the time the Fightin' Fury was to play their first game, he along with the team supported Malik in the decision to strike over the Colonels deal.

In a prequel episode surrounding the year of 2017, Garrett's father Nelson sought out the best agent for him. Tasha Mack made efforts to pursue and persuade him to sign on board with her but Nelson declines and goes with another agent because Tasha doesn't have the right credentials and license to do so. Garrett however seemed to take interest in signing with Tasha Mack. Days after the strike the team was left to decide the next move in which they had some leisure time. He then decides to plan a camping trip with Raquel, Brittany and Jameson. While exploring nature outdoors, Garrett struggles to learn about Raquel who seems to be very private about her personal life, which she ascribes to a complicated relationship with her mother. He confronts her about and she tells him she would open up to when the time is right. As they make up they learn tragic news about the Colonel. His dad Nelson, persuaded him to do a background check on Raquel believing she's just with him for the money and fame, however performs it himself and hands it to Garret on the afternoon of Tee-Tee's wedding to which uncovers that she lied about her mother who was incarcerated for murder. He tried his best to hide it from her, but Raquel desperately sought out the paper because it was told by Jamison that it was a love letter Garret wrote for her, to which he lied. She finds it a few days later in his dresser while he showered. She abruptly packs up and leaves his apartment without his knowledge and leaves him on a trail to apologize which she couldn't accept. He later rekindles and old date from the past but quickly realizes that moving on was hard for him to do. He secretly visits Raquel who is supporting her mother's parole appearance and learns through the testimony that the things her mother described about her self defense was the same story Raquel shared with him during their camping trip citing it as a scary story. After court, he softly sough out answers to what really happened, so that they both can learn to trust each other again. They rekindle their love for one another that afternoon.

Jamison Fields
- The Game (2021) character
- First appearance: "A Taste of Vegas" (Season 10, episode 1)
- Portrayed by: Vaughn W. Hebron

In-universe information
- Nicknames: J.J. Jiggles, Jimmy
- Occupation: Waiter at Joint 51; Male exotic dancer (Joint 51); Fitness Instructor ("Poles & Pasta"-community service job); Football player
- Significant others: Allison Morris (ex-girlfriend); Brittany Pitts (current girlfriend)
- Children: Son (baby with Allison)
- Relatives: Lula Fields (Mother)

=== Jamison Fields ===
- Jamison Fields (Portrayed by Vaughn W. Hebron - Season 10, season 1 Paramount+) is a young man who had a troubling past in his high school football days. He was accused at 18 years old of sexually assaulting a 16-year-old Caucasian girl name Allison who at the time he was dating. He also confessed to the crime but it was later revealed he took her to his prom after she lied so that she can attend, and it was their first time they ever had sexual relations and as he awoke the next morning to find that he was surrounded by police officers charging him for a crime he was unaware of happening because his only crime was making love to someone he loved and was in a consensual relationship with. He served three years in prison and had been released on probation. He was hoping to escape the past by aiming for an opportunity at Fury Week open tryouts to get a spot to play for the Fightin' Fury. Jamison faced heavy criticism by the public deeming him as a "rapist", which in turn affected his reputation to be on the team. At the same time he's been pushing to go pro in Montreal, Canada while waiting on his waiver, but the parole board denies his access. However, Tasha Mack took a chance with him to represent him as his sports agent.

During this time he tries to persuade the Colonel and the coach to play for the team, but the request is rejected each time. Jamison spent all his earnings on his career which resulted him being homeless, living and sleeping in his own car. He hid his place a residence for fears of being judged by Malik, he stated he felt 'free' after Malik found out and offers him his home to stay. Over time he gains interest in Brittany Pitts. He reveals to her about his past of his mother being homeless due to drugs. Jason Pitts finds out that the two of them were interested in each other in which Jamison expressed his intentions with Brit-Brat. After injuring his ankle during scrimmage with the San Diego Sabers, he turned to cortisone steroids to reduce the pain, which Brittany see and urges him not to become addicted. He eventually gets to sign with The Las Vegas Fightin' Fury after a long streak of trying to get the Colonel's approval to play the team.

- Fields started as the player number '18' in the open tryouts during 'Fury Week' as rookie. Malik traded up Jamison's jersey for the player number '13' after his initiation into the team in honor of past player Kenny Washington.

Jamison Fields
No. 18 (Rookie) 13 (Pro) – Las Vegas Fightin' Fury
- Position: Running back

Personal information
- Born: May 1999 (age 22); Las Vegas, Nevada
- Listed height: 6 ft 1 in (1.85 m)

Career history
- C.V. High School - Runningback (2013-2017); Las Vegas Fightin' Fury (2021-Present)

In the premiere prequel episode of season 2 (paramount +), it is revealed how Jamison's fate of facing statutory rape charges came upon him. The night after being crowned prom king at his high school prom, he and Allison stayed in a hotel where they celebrated romantically into the morning. Eager to watch the 2017 pro-football draft picks, in which he aspired to be in 3 years, they talked about future plans, but was interrupted when police knocked at the door and explained there was a missing person report out on Allison after she didn't return home. Fields assured that they just were not in danger and didn't understand what the issue was, days later meeting with Allison who spoke of her strong love for him as she had plans to escape her family and took her life savings so that they could move to Canada. He felt it was best to speak her father and apologize, but was easily conned into confessing to having sexual relations with her, to which he was arrested on the spot.

Present day 2022, Allison returned to surprise him at their first game, where the team eventually made a decision to strike, meeting Brittany for the first time. However a few days later she found him to tell him she saw an episode of 'Hard Blocks' where it reminded her how much they were in love and also knew that he may have feelings for Brittany. He then confessed his truth as to who he rather be in love with, Britt. Continuing to dealing with his pain from his injury while on a camping trip, he gets an old friend Smoke, who served time with him in prison to do a favor for him as he forgot his backpack containing his medicine at the house. His friend shows concern for his usage, hoping he wouldn't become addicted.

Over the next for weeks, he became more addicted to the painkillers hiding it from Brittany, she again finds out he was secretly taking them after he was caught also lying about giving up exotic dancing. She gave him ultimatum for their relationship to which he agreed to give it up entirely. However on the morning of Malik's best friend Tee-Tee's wedding, he found a pill that dropped out of his clothing and secretly took it, which led him into a mind altering frenzy believing everyone around him were talking in song as a whimsy musical. He freaked out calling smoke who told him he might have taken a 'party drug' and he assured him that it may wear off within 9 hours. During Tee-Tee's first dance with his wife, Jamison notices that the talking in songs have stopped and felt he was free from the drug, once again lying to Brittany that he is free of any drugs as he believed and thought the effects wore off. Hours later after the wedding, he embarks on his trip for work driving Smokes car. While in route he becomes distracted by music in the car of a R&B version of "Tops (Day is Done)" which Brittany earlier sang to him. Believing he was rid of the musical, he tries to stop the music playback by shutting it off, but it continues to come back on by itself resulting in him nearly colliding with a deer in the road and driving off into the river where the car eventually sunk with him still in it. Moments later as he was rescued, he then envisions being stuck in a white purgatory phase where he was faced to deicide which door to enter of the one he loves, Allison or Brittany as he was transported and hospitalized as a coma patient. He chose to walk through the door of Brittany where he attempted to reach out and speak to him but became barricaded behind bars once he got close to her. He soon wakes up out of his coma and persuades himself that he has energy to train again in time for football but is arrested for violating his parole for possession of illegal drugs.

== Key supporting characters in the series ==
This is a list of selected key characters in the series, who have appeared in a recurring role, often serving as a major supporting character with significant importance to the plots.

=== Tee-Tee ===
Tee-Tee
- The Game character
- First appearance: "Brittany's Super Sweet Sixth" (Season 1, Episode 5)
- Last appearance: "One Wedding and a Musical" (Season 11, Episode 8)
- Portrayed by: Barry Floyd

In-universe information
- Full name: Terrance Carter
- Nicknames: "Tee-Tee" 'T-Squared' (by himself) 'Tee Double' (by Malik)
- Significant other: Alison ("Ally") (Girlfriend/Wife)
- Children: 1 baby (sex not revealed yet)
- Occupation: Malik Wright's Liaison (retired); Owner, Tee-Tee's 'Cluck Truck' (discontinued)
- Position: Assistant/Representative

- Terrance "Tee-Tee" Carter is portrayed by Barry Floyd. He is the childhood friend, right hand man and personal assistant to Malik Wright, a liaison to his career. His character serves as the comic relief of the series. Tee-Tee was initially referred as his 'rep' (representative) offscreen before his physical onscreen appearance. In the first few seasons, his personality was displayed occasionally as quick to respond in an odd manner, to any conversation he was around. He normally took orders from Malik who at times can be aggressive in his delivery towards him. He has a sincere heart and pleasantly served well at giving advice to everyone who came in contact with him.

During his journey with Malik he's stood with him away from the games like his sidekick, normally handling duties at home like answering phones, and speaking for him when Malik declines to talk to others. Terrance often took care of Malik's dirty work when it came to his groupies, he would help to escort them out and sometimes would flirt with them in the process. Many times he would instigate events he was present around. He indirectly had a crush on Tasha Mack.

In season 4, Tee-Tee found his newfound independence working a food truck called "Tee-Tee's Cluck Truck" serving the community chicken wing meals. He also began dating Alison, who also works with him. He begins to stand up to Malik as he grew tired of continuously watch him make countless mistakes and assisting him. He expressed to Malik that he's tired of being treated as if he still work for him, being that Terrance has moved on to work for himself. However, Malik reminds him that he was the one responsible to help him start up the business. The two start to disagree with each other and Terrance find out that Malik has been flirting and sleeping with Alison behind his back. The friendship starts to ceases, leaving Malik to find new assistants, preferably selecting seductive women. Terrance comes back to train the new hire expecting an apology from Malik, but instead finds himself apologizing for his own loyalty towards him since they were kids. He ends his relationship with Malik. He then goes on record exposing Malik on Jason Pitts news segment called "Benched: Sport Talk" outting him about the relationship affair while others were part of calling him out for his past behaviors.

Through seasons 8–9, Tee-Tee struggled with his food business where he was ordered to shut down the food truck due to a salmonella poisoning. He faced charges after someone died as a result of it and faced hardcore shame after it. He decided to work for Malik's burger business 'Phatty's'.

In the prequel episode of season 11 (season 2 paramount+) following the events of season 9 in 2017 and leading into season 11, Malik thanks him for his years long services and shares he feels completed, and Tee-Tee reveals he was resigning and relocating to Texas, revealing he has a baby on the way with his girlfriend Ally. He later marries her on a special musical episode titled "One Wedding and a Musical" to which he expressed his fears after Malik went on a music video apology tour about multiple woman he slept with recounting their own past when Ally and Malik had sexual relations causing Ally to feel guilty. The wedding was however a success, but later led into a tragic accident for Malik's new teammate and Brit-Brat's boyfriend Jamison, who after leaving the wedding drove off the road into the river after being under the influence of hallucinogen drugs, as he believed everyone around him was speaking through music and song.

=== Janay Brice ===
Janay Brice
- The Game character
- First appearance: "The List Episode" (Season 2, Episode 13)
- Last appearance: "Fits and Starts" (Season 5, Episode 16)
- Portrayed by: Gabrielle Dennis

In-universe information
- Full name: Janay Brice
- Occupation: 'Janay's Boutique' (owner)
- Family: Father (coffee lid inventor)
- Significant others: Derwin Davis (separated, co-parenting); Noah Senegal (husband)
- Children: Derwin Davis Jr. ("D.J.")
- Previous relationships: Hill Harper; Dwyane Wade; Lamar Odom

- Janay Brice-Senegal is portrayed by Gabrielle Dennis. She was introduced to Derwin by Malik Wright. Derwin had hoped to find a 'good girl' after his breakup from ex-girlfriend Melanie but learned that Janay had past relationships with Dwyane Wade, Lamar Odom & Hill Harper and went to prom with Chad Johnson prior to meeting Derwin which made him curious as to why she was interested in him. He felt intimidated by her presence of her past. She assured him that she don't need money or fame due to her family's inheritance and pointed out she was much of an independent woman. She eventually moves in with Derwin. After Derwin suffers a knee injury during the pre-championship game, they get into their first disagreement due to Derwin feeling unmotivated to celebrate. She leaves to Miami to support the Sabers, who wins the World Championship without his presence and felt guilty vacationing without him and about not being home supporting him by his side. She then confesses that she feels afraid that she might be in love with him. She returned home to the victory parade and finds that Melanie dropped Derwin off there, she became disappointed that he's been keeping secretes from her, holding on to his past and point out that he's still in love with her. Weeks later after miscommunication between them, she reveals to Derwin that she's pregnant. Melanie visits Derwin right in the middle of them discussing it and learns about it. Janay decided to separate after seeing Melanie kiss him. Derwin visits her at her boutique store where she had already spread the news and to his concern he believed it was too fast to know if she was indeed pregnant, but Janay was confident about not being ashamed about it. He wanted to be sure by giving her an over the counter pregnancy test, to which she complies. Melanie pays a visit to her store to confront her on the validity of the child being Derwin's. They debate the child's gender when she gets an ultrasound, however weeks later she reveals it to be a boy to which Derwin glees with joy. They continued to stay separated but Derwin calls her over to surprise her with family matching outfits and she confronts him to specify that his growing relationship should be only to his son, and to stop pretending their relationship is something that it's not. As he should continue with his love for Melanie. As time passes she starts developing prenatal depression and acknowledges she still have feelings for Derwin. They rekindle their romance to which Melanie secretly sees. Janay gets in a friendly debate with Derwin over the name of the baby and receives surprise a phone call from Hill Harper asking her to see him, she asks Derwin permission to attend. Before meeting with him, she gets a surprise visit from Melanie who sent her support of gifts for the baby. She confronts him about his visit with Harper. and challenges his relationship with her. They officially break up, as Derwin moved on and proposed to Melanie. Upon waiting to give birth she gets a false alarm. Months later, The two get married and before the exchanging of vows she calls him to tell him that she's in labor, in which Derwin hesitates hoping she can stall delivering the baby, but Melanie insists that he should support her through the birthing process, leaving her at the altar. The baby name is revealed to be named Derwin Davis Jr.

2 years later, Janay and Derwin had been working on co-parenting, while she built a partnership with Melanie who is now Derwin's wife. She became appalled to learn Derwin questioned her if he was the father to DJ. Learning that Melanie snuck a paternity test in the process. She got proof that the child is indeed his and threatens him to court.

=== Rick Fox ===
Rick Fox
- The Game character
- First appearance: "The Truth Hurts" (Season 2, Episode 8)
- Portrayed by: Rick Fox

In-universe information
- Full name: Rick Fox
- Occupation: Basketball Player (Lakers, retired); Agent, (Irv Smiff Management - resigned); Comedian; Sports Agency Owner (former, Rick Fox Agency - currently Tasha Mack Agency)
- Significant other: Tasha Mack (separated)

- Rick Fox is portrayed by Rick Fox. He is a former athlete who is light spirited and charismatic. He first worked at Irv Smiff Management (ISM) as an agent. He took the position after retiring form The Lakers. At the beginning of his management position, he lacked obtaining clients as Tasha Mack pointed out. Over a debacle between the managers, Rick Fox finally gets an assignment to manage a client Carnell Young, who chose him. After weeks of working in the management, he admits and confesses to Tasha Mack that he grew feelings for her overtime. She quickly submits to his interest and later gets intimate with him. Days after having chemistry away from work, Rick learns Tasha wanted to keep their romance secret and act in a discreet manner at work so no one become suspicious of them. Her behavior becomes irate in the office, and he bluntly calls her a 'bitch' in front of everyone, both making it almost obvious something going on with them but to his defense he did it for show. Rick later stood his ground towards Tasha to tell her to give up the secrecy. He brings her to visit his mother where she learns about his heritage. Ms. Fox became worried about his future and his relationships, jealous of the care he used to get. Tasha confronts her about letting him make his own choices and leaves to a party where Rick later found her. Rick had kept a secret from Tasha when he was accidentally exposed by Kelly's guest at a dinner party, telling her that Rick used to date Robin Givens who was currently dating her son Malik. He met with Malik to have a heart to heart talk to defuse the situation. They make up and due to an insecurity on Tasha's behalf, she tries to spice up her sexual side by pleasing him by performing fellatio on his toes hoping it would be more attractive as she felt she was in competition against his past lovers. Rick helps her to understand all she needed was to be herself. At the office they were approaching budget cuts and Tasha came to his defense, she briefs him back at home to close the deal on a client so that he wont get cut, Rick starts to confess he's ready to marry Tasha and spend the rest of his life with her. Tasha wants it to be authentic by challenging his emotions for 3 days to see if he still feels the same. During this time Rick gets a promoted at ISM as a result of closing the deal with Michael Phelps, while at the same time Tasha is cut and Rick takes her place. She explodes in emotions which exposes their romance relationship. Rick tries to defend himself, but she outburst Rihanna's song "Take a Bow" to explain her pain believing the whole time he lied and used her to get ahead, backstabbing her. Rick Fox later meets with Tasha who feels apologetic, he finally came to his decision to end the relationship by telling her he's moving to work at ISM in South beach, Miami. Rick Fox returns to surprise Tasha at Derwin and Melanie's wedding to forgive her.

Pookie Woods
- The Game character
- First appearance: "I Want It All and I Want It Now" (Season 3, Episode 21)
- Portrayed by: Rockmond Dunbar

In-universe information
- Full name: Marion Woods
- Occupation: Bodyguard
- Spouses: Tasha Mack (wife, renewed vows)
- Children: Kai Mack (daughter)
- Origin: Richmond, California

=== Pookie Woods ===
- Marion "Pookie" Woods is portrayed by Rockmond Dunbar. He is introduced into the series first as Tasha Mack's back up plan to handle situations if ever she was in trouble. She mentioned his name early on in the show insinuating him as a hitman, but his first official appearance came in the finale episodes of season 3. He was summoned by Tee-Tee who quietly made the emergency 'code blue' call to come to Malik's rescue when his half-sister Pucci was being taken advantage of while hanging with hardcore rappers who was supposed to be recording a song with her in the studio. It was possible the producer was going to use her to get her to sleep with them, after getting her intoxicated and drugged. He arrived with Tasha Mack who handle to situation allowing Pookie to intimidate them. Pookie acknowledged the producer by detailing evidential information about him and gave him an ultimatum to resolve the issue by leaving them alone or being handled by him. The producer and his entourage backed down to cease any problems.
