= Voices (American band) =

American R&B vocal girl group

- Origin: Los Angeles, California, U.S.
- Genres: R&B, new jack swing
- Years active: 1989–1993
- Labels: Zoo Entertainment
- Past members: Monique Wilson; Arike Rice; LaPetra McMoore; LaToya McMoore; Tia Mowry; Tamera Mowry

Voices was an American R&B vocal girl group from Los Angeles that was active during the late 1980s until the early 1990s. The group consisted of members Monique Wilson, Arike Rice, sisters LaPetra and LaToya McMoore, and well known twins Tia and Tamera Mowry.

== Debut album: Just the Beginning... ==
The group's only album, Just the Beginning... debuted in 1992 on Zoo Entertainment. The album featured Jo Marie Payton as a guest vocalist and Berry Gordy, Jr. was among the composers. Just the Beginning... features songs such as "Yeah, Yeah, Yeah!" (the group's most successful single), "M.M.D.R.N.F. (My Mama Didn't Raise No Fool)", and "Cloudy with a Chance of Tears". The album was commercially unsuccessful. Arike Rice became a member of the group Before Dark eight years later. Tia and Tamera's mom Darlene removed the twins from the group after a disagreement with management prior to the release of their debut album. Voices and other urban acts on Zoo's roster were also overlooked in favor of its popular alternative rock groups, who took up most of the label's focus.

== Legacy ==
American singer Beyoncé and the other members of early '90s girl group Girl's Tyme can be seen in several early rehearsal videos practicing "Yeah, Yeah, Yeah".

At the September 4, 2023 show of the Renaissance World Tour in Inglewood, California, Beyoncé spotted old friend and former Voices member Tia Mowry in the audience, blew her a kiss, and then spontaneously interpolated a portion of "Yeah, Yeah, Yeah" into "1+1".

== Discography ==
=== Albums ===
Year	Album	Chart
Year	Album	US Top R&B Albums
1992	Just the Beginning...	66

=== Singles ===
Year	Song	Chart		
Year	Song	US Hot 100	US R&B	US Rhythmic
1992	"Yeah, Yeah, Yeah!"	72	14	31
1993	"M.M.D.R.N.F. (My Mama Didn't Raise No Fool)"	-	53	-
1993	"Cloudy with a Chance Of Tears"	-	97	-
