= Tia Mowry =

American actress (born 1978)

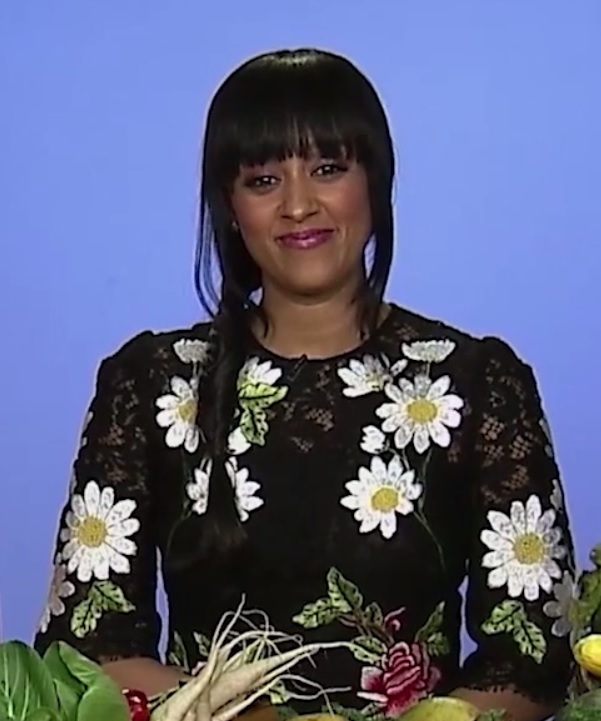
- Mowry in 2017
- Born: Tia Dashon Mowry; July 6, 1978 (age 48); Gelnhausen, Hesse, West Germany
- Education: Pepperdine University (BS)
- Occupations: Actress; producer; author; entrepreneur; television personality; singer
- Years active: 1990–present
- Spouse: Cory Hardrict (m. 2008; div. 2023)
- Children: 2
- Relatives: Tamera Mowry (twin sister); Tahj Mowry (brother); Tavior Mowry (brother)

Tia Dashon Mowry (/mɔːri/; July 6, 1978) is an American actress. She first gained recognition for her starring role as Tia Landry in the sitcom Sister, Sister (1994–1999), opposite her twin sister Tamera Mowry. The sisters then starred together in the fantasy comedy film Seventeen Again (2000) and voiced the LaBelle sisters in the animated series Detention (1999–2000). The two also starred in the Disney Channel Original Movie Twitches (2005) and its sequel, Twitches Too (2007). They were featured in the reality series Tia & Tamera from 2011 to 2013.

Mowry voiced Sasha in the animated series Bratz (2005–2006). She starred as Melanie Barnett in the comedy-drama series The Game (2006–2012, 2015), Stephanie Phillips in the sitcom Instant Mom (2013–2015) and Cocoa McKellan in the sitcom Family Reunion (2019–2022).

Mowry had starring roles in the teen comedy film The Hot Chick (2002), the musical comedy film The Mistle-Tones (2012), the romantic comedy film Baggage Claim (2013) and the drama film Indivisible (2018).

Mowry and her sister, Tamera, formed a singing group in the early 1990s called Voices. The group debuted their first single, "Yeah, Yeah, Yeah!", in 1992 and it charted at No. 72 on the Billboard Hot 100.

== Early life ==
Tia Dashon Mowry was born in Gelnhausen, West Germany, on July 6, 1978. Her mother, Darlene Renée Mowry (née Flowers), managed her children's careers when they were in the group Voices and also worked as a security guard. Her father, Timothy John Mowry, was in the U.S. Army at the time of her birth and later became a correctional officer with the City of Glendale Police Department, when the family moved to California.

Her father is of British and Irish ancestry and her mother is of Afro-Bahamian descent. Her parents met in high school, in Miami, Florida. Both joined the U.S. Army and eventually reached the rank of Sergeant. Her family is "close-knit" and "very spiritual," as the sisters became born-again Christians when they were eight.

Tia is two minutes younger than her twin sister, Tamera. Tamera was born first, at 4:30pm, followed by Tia at 4:32pm. She also has two younger brothers, actor Tahj Mowry and musician Tavior Mowry, who played college football for University of California, Davis.

== Career ==
Mowry and her sister began entering pageants and talent shows while their family was stationed at Fort Hood, Texas. Mowry's mom Darlene removed the twins from the early 90s R&B girl group Voices after a disagreement with management prior to the release of their debut album. At age 12, they convinced their mother to move to California with them so they could pursue acting. She agreed, on the condition that they land an acting job within the first month of their stay. In 1990, their family moved to California permanently, settling in Los Angeles, and Mowry and her sister began appearing in commercials and small roles.

Mowry is well known for playing Tia Landry, a twin separated at birth and reunited with her sister as a teenager in the show Sister, Sister. The series was developed for Mowry and her real life twin sister, Tamera, after a producer spotted them on the set of Full House, a show on which their brother Tahj made regular appearances. Mowry and her sister are both singers and showcased their vocal abilities on episodes of Sister Sister, singing covers of "You Can't Hurry Love" and "Amazing Grace", as well as "I'm Going Down", which Tamera performed solo. They also sang the show's theme song during season five and six. Sister, Sister was initially on ABC but was cancelled by the network after two years and picked up by The WB, where it ran for another four years. During its run, they guest-starred on the Sister, Sister crossover episode of The Jamie Foxx Show, appeared on an episode of their brother Tahj's sitcom Smart Guy, and did voice-over work for the Kids' WB series Detention. On the Blue's Clues episode titled "Blue's Birthday", which aired in 1998, Mowry and her sister make a cameo appearance as two of the celebrities wishing Blue a happy birthday. Their only line is said in unison: "Happy Birthday, Blue!"

After Sister, Sister ended, both Mowry and her sister studied psychology at Pepperdine University. She also went to Europe to study humanities and Italian for a period. Mowry later co-starred in the 2000 movie Seventeen Again with her siblings Tamera and Tahj. She also did voice-overs for the 4KidsTV cartoon Bratz as the voice of Sasha. In 2002, she and Tamera appeared in the Rob Schneider comedy film The Hot Chick, playing cheerleaders. In 2005, the twins co-starred in the Disney Channel Original Movie Twitches and reprised their roles in its sequel, Twitches Too. Mowry also appeared on an episode of her sister's television show, Strong Medicine, in January 2006, playing the role of Keisha, the twin sister of Tamera's character, Dr. Kayla Thornton.

For five seasons, beginning in late 2006, Mowry had a starring role in the BET television series The Game as Melanie Barnett. For her work in television, Mowry has been nominated for a Teen Choice Award and an NAACP Image Award for best actress in a comedy. Beginning in July 2011, the Style Network began airing Tia & Tamera, a reality show which followed the day-to-day lives of the twins and showcased Tia being pregnant with her first child and Tamera planning her wedding. In May 2012, Mowry published her first book, Oh, Baby: Pregnancy Tales and Advice from One Hot Mama to Another, about her pregnancy and being a working mother. That same month, Mowry revealed on Twitter that she would not be returning to The Game, for a sixth season. From 2013 to 2015, she starred in the NickMom/Nick at Nite series Instant Mom.

From 2015 to 2017, Mowry starred in her Cooking Channel series Tia Mowry at Home, where she made everything from macaroni and cheese, cake, pie, curry chicken, collard greens, shakshuka, potato, galette and various types of cocktails. Some of her guest stars included her The Game co-stars Hosea Chanchez, Wendy Raquel Robinson, and Brittany Daniel, as well as Lilly Singh from YouTube and singer Kelly Rowland. In 2016, Mowry started a podcast on PodcastOne called Mostly Mom with Tia Mowry. On April 29, 2016, she appeared with her twin sister on the daytime talk show The Real, where she promoted her new book Twintution.

From 2019 to 2022, Mowry starred on the Netflix comedy series, Family Reunion. The show was nominated for Outstanding Children's Program three years in a row at the NAACP Image Awards, winning in 2020 and 2021. In September 2021, Mowry released her second cookbook, The Quick Fix Kitchen, published by Rodale Books. The book includes mealtime hacks, tips to bring joy and balance to the kitchen and easy, delicious and healthy recipes the entire family will love. In 2021, Tia partnered with Gibson to release an extensive homeware collection, Spice! by Tia Mowry. In 2023, Mowry launched a haircare line named 4u by Tia.

== Personal life ==
On April 20, 2008, Mowry married actor Cory Hardrict, whom she met on the set of the film, Hollywood Horror. The pair separated in October 2022, due to irreconcilable differences, and finalized their divorce in April 2023. Together, they have two children, a son (born in 2011) and a daughter (born in 2018).

According to the April 22, 2025, episode of Finding Your Roots, William Brewster, a passenger on the Mayflower who became the senior elder of the Plymouth Colony, is the 13th great-grandfather of Mowry.

== Filmography ==
=== Film ===
Year	Title	Role	Notes
2002	The Hot Chick	Venetia	
2004	Bratz: Rock Angelz	Sasha	Voice, direct to video
2005	Hollywood Horror	Kendra	
2006	Bratz: Genie Magic	Sasha	Voice, direct to video
2006	Bratz: Forever Diamondz	Sasha	Voice, direct to video
2008	The American Standards	Kate	
2013	Bratz Go to Paris: The Movie	Sasha	Voice, direct to video
2013	Baggage Claim	Janine	
2018	Indivisible	Tonya Lewis	
2025	My Secret Santa	Natasha Burton	

=== Television ===
Year	Title	Role	Notes
1990	Rosie	Tia Tanner	Episode: "Adventures in Blondiesitting"
1991	Dangerous Women	Judith Ann Webb	Unknown episodes
1992	True Colors	Rene	Episode: "In a Flash"
1992	Full House	Denise	Episode: "The Devil Made Me Do It"
1994–1999	Sister, Sister	Tia Landry	Main role
1995	All New Mickey Mouse Club	Tia Mowry	Season 7, Episode 10; Cameo.
1996	Are You Afraid of the Dark?	Janice Robinson	Episode: "The Tale of the Chameleons"
1996	The Adventures of Hyperma	The Bad Emma	Voice, episode: "The Good, the Bad and the Emmas"
1997	Smart Guy	Rachelle	Episode: "Brother, Brother"
1999–2000	Detention	Lemonjella LaBelle	Voice, 13 episodes
2000	Seventeen Again	Sydney Donovan	Television film
2001–2005	Express Yourself	Herself	Interstitial series
2005–2006	Bratz	Sasha	Voice, 17 episodes
2005	Twitches	Alex Fielding / Artemis DuBaer	Television film
2005	Love, Inc.	Kim	2 episodes
2006	Strong Medicine	Keisha	Episode: "My Sister, My Doctor, Myself"
2006–2007	Girlfriends	Melanie Barnett	2 episodes
2006–2015	The Game	Dr. Melanie Barnett-Davis	Main role (seasons 1-5); guest (season 9)
2007	Twitches Too	Alex Fielding / Artemis DuBaer	Television film
2007	America's Next Top Model	Herself/Guest Star	Episode: "The Girl Who Impresses Pedro"
2008	Lies & Deceit	Kate	Television film
2010	Double Wedding	Deanna Warren	Television film
2011–2013	Tia & Tamera	Herself	Main role
2012	The Mistle-Tones	Holly	Television film
2013–2015	Instant Mom	Stephanie Phillips	Main role
2015	Fresh Beat Band of Spies	Sindy Sauernotes	Voice, Episode: "The Wow Factor"
2015–2017	Tia Mowry at Home	Herself / Host	Main role
2016	Rosewood	Cassie	3 episodes
2016	Mistresses	Barbara	4 episodes
2016	Man with a Plan	Brenda	Episode: "Un-Dressed"
2017	Nicky, Ricky, Dicky & Dawn	Ericka Knightly	2 episodes
2017–2018	Me, Myself, & I	Wendy	4 episodes
2018	My Christmas Inn	Jen Taylor	Television film
2018	A Gingerbread Romance	Taylor Scott	Television film
2019–2022	Family Reunion	Cocoa McKellan	Main role
2019	A Black Lady Sketch Show	Imani	Episode: "Where Are My Background Singers"
2019	A Very Vintage Christmas	Dodie Brite	Television film
2019	Prince of Peoria	Meghan	Episode: "Game Night"
2021	RuPaul's Drag Race: All Stars	Herself	Episode: "Side Hustles"
2021	Miracle In Motor City	Amber DuPoint	Television film
2023	Hell's Kitchen	Herself	Episode: "The Fab Five Take Flight"
2023	American Dad!	Max (voice)	Episode: "Cow I Met Your Moo-ther"
2023	Yes, Chef! Christmas	Alicia Gellar	Television Holiday Show
2024	Tia Mowry: My Next Act	Herself	Reality series
2024	A Very Merry Beauty Salon	Sienna	Television Holiday Show
2026	Single Black Tenant	Esme Williams	Television film

=== Music videos ===
Year	Title	Artist	Notes
1992	"Yeah, Yeah, Yeah!"	Voices	
1999	"I Really Like It"	Harlem World featuring Mase and Kelly Price	Guest appearance
2009	"Under"	Pleasure P	Featured

=== Radio ===
Year	Title	Role	Episode
2015	Sway's Universe: Sway In the Morning	Herself	"Our Sister, Sister Tia Mowry Goes From The Game to Reality T.V. + New Chef Speaks On Keke Issue"
2019	The Breakfast Club	Herself	"Tia Mowry On Growing Up A Twin, Non-Traditional Parenting, New Series Family Reunion + More"

=== Video games ===
Year	Title	Role
2005	Bratz: Rock Angelz	Sasha
2006	Bratz Forever Diamondz	Sasha
2007	Bratz: The Movie	Sasha

== Awards and nominations ==
=== Honors ===
- 1998: Inducted into the Nickelodeon Kids' Choice Awards Hall of Fame with her sister Tamera Mowry

=== Accolades ===
Association	Year	Category	Title	Result
Acapulco Black Film Festival	2014	Best Ensemble Cast	Baggage Claim	Nominated
NAACP Image Awards	1996	Outstanding Youth Actor/Actress (shared with Tamera Mowry)	Sister, Sister	Nominated
NAACP Image Awards	1999	Outstanding Lead Actress in a Comedy Series (shared with Tamera Mowry)	Sister, Sister	Won
NAACP Image Awards	2000	Outstanding Lead Actress in a Comedy Series (shared with Tamera Mowry)	Sister, Sister	Won
NAACP Image Awards	2008	Outstanding Actress in a Comedy Series	The Game	Nominated
NAACP Image Awards	2009	Outstanding Actress in a Comedy Series	The Game	Nominated
NAACP Image Awards	2011	Outstanding Actress in a Television Movie, Miniseries or Dramatic Special	Double Wedding	Nominated
NAACP Image Awards	2012	Outstanding Actress in a Comedy Series	The Game	Nominated
NAACP Image Awards	2020	Outstanding Children's Program	Family Reunion	Won
NAACP Image Awards	2021	Outstanding Children's Program	Family Reunion	Won
NAACP Image Awards	2022	Outstanding Children's Program	Family Reunion	Won
NAMIC Vision Awards	2014	Best Performance – Comedy	Instant Mom	Nominated
NAMIC Vision Awards	2015	Best Performance – Comedy	Instant Mom	Nominated
Nickelodeon Kid's Choice Awards	1995	Favorite Television Actress (shared with Tamera Mowry)	Sister, Sister	Won
Nickelodeon Kid's Choice Awards	1996	Favorite Television Actress (shared with Tamera Mowry)	Sister, Sister	Won
Nickelodeon Kid's Choice Awards	1997	Favorite Television Actress (shared with Tamera Mowry)	Sister, Sister	Won
Nickelodeon Kid's Choice Awards	1998	Favorite Television Actress (shared with Tamera Mowry)	Sister, Sister	Nominated
People's Choice Awards	2012	Favorite Television Celebrity Star (shared with Tamera Mowry)	—N/a	Nominated
Teen Choice Awards	2007	Choice TV Actress – Comedy	The Game	Nominated
Teen Choice Awards	2012	Choice TV Reality/Variety Star – Female (shared with Tamera Mowry)	—N/a	Nominated
Teen Choice Awards	2013	Choice TV Reality/Variety Star – Female (shared with Tamera Mowry)	—N/a	Nominated
Young Artist Awards	1995	Best Youth Comedienne in a Television Show (shared with Tamera Mowry)	Sister, Sister	Nominated
Young Artist Awards	1996	Best Performance by a Young Actress – TV Comedy Series (shared with Tamera Mowry)	Sister, Sister	Nominated
Young Artist Awards	1997	Best Performance in a TV Comedy – Leading Young Actress (shared with Tamera Mowry)	Sister, Sister	Nominated
Young Artist Awards	2001	Best Performance in a TV Movie (Comedy) – Leading Young Actress (shared with Tamera Mowry)	Seventeen Again	Nominated
