= Toby Sandeman =

English actor, model, and sprinter

Personal information
- Nationality: British (English)
- Born: 2 March 1988 (age 38) Hammersmith, London, England

Sport
- Sport: Athletics
- Event: Sprints
Medal record
Men's athletics
Representing Great Britain
European Athletics U23 Championships
Gold medal – first place	2009 Kaunas	200 metres
Gold medal – first place	2009 Kaunas	4×100 metres

Toby Sandeman (born 2 March 1988) is an English actor, international model and double gold medalist who represented Great Britain in the 200 metres. He won the 200 m at the UK Athletics national championships in 2009, and followed this with two gold medals at the European Athletics U23 Championships. He has modelled for Calvin Klein, Ralph Lauren, and worked with Naomi Campbell for Vogue magazine.

== Early life ==
Born in Hammersmith, London, Sandeman was introduced to athletics from an early age: his family enjoyed the feats of former British sprinter Linford Christie. He lived in Barbados from the age of 6 to 15 and returned to England on a rugby scholarship with Downside School. He found himself more drawn to athletics competitions, however, and competed at the English Schools' Athletics Championships. He failed to pass the first round and, as he advanced through the age groups, victory never came. In spite of this, he remained passionate about the sport and a chance training opportunity with childhood hero Christie arose when his mother won a competition. After the session, Christie recommended his old coach, Ron Roddan, to Sandeman. He trained with Roddan through his teens and competed in the 200 metres at the 2008 British Athletics Championships. A hamstring injury forced him to withdraw but he vowed to his coach that he would return and win the following year.

== Modeling and breakthrough season ==
Sandeman's modeling career had blossomed by this point: Trevor Sorbie, a renowned hairdresser, was a family friend and had suggested he try modeling. Despite his initial reluctance, Sandeman went on to work for Ralph Lauren, Calvin Klein, and did a Vogue photoshoot with Naomi Campbell. This work enabled him to save up enough money to focus on just his athletics career for a whole year. He returned to the 2009 British Athletics Championships and fulfilled his promise to his coach, beating Marlon Devonish, Christian Malcolm, and then-European leader Jeffrey Lawal-Balogun to take the 200 m national title. Having a previous best of a modest 20.96 seconds before the championships, his 20.69 s performance in the final was a surprise victory.

His winning time was short of the A qualification time for the 2009 World Championships in Athletics, and Christie recommended that he compete at the 2009 European Athletics U23 Championships. Sandeman again defied expectation by winning two gold medals at his first major international competition. German athlete Aleixo-Platini Menga was the favourite but Sandeman recorded a new personal best of 20.37 to win. Not only was this a third of a second faster than his previous best, but it was also the leading time in Europe over the 200 m, earning him qualification for the World Championships. On the final day of the competition, he ran the 4×100 metres relay with British team mates Ryan Scott, Rion Pierre and Leevan Yearwood, to take his second gold of the competition.

He was named in the 2009 World Championships Team GB squad, but had to withdraw due to a lack of fitness and a foot problem.

== Personal bests ==
Event	Best (seconds)	Location	Date
60 metres	7.16	Uxbridge, England	21 January 2006
100 metres	10.26	Claremont, California, United States	4 April 2009
200 metres	20.37	Kaunas, Lithuania	18 July 2009
400 metres	49.6	Kingston, Cambridgeshire, England	15 April 2006

== Filmography ==
=== Television ===
Year	Title	Role	Notes
2017–18	The Royals	Prince Sebastian Idrisi	Recurring role
2021–22	Power Book III: Raising Kanan	Symphony Bosket	Main cast (season 1); Guest (season 2)
2021–23	The Game	Garrett Evans	Main cast
2025–present	Running Point	Marcus Winfield	Main cast

=== Film ===
Year	Title	Role
2026	Voicemails for Isabelle	Tyler
2026	Guarding Stars	Robbie
