= The Game (2021 TV series) =

American comedy drama created by Mara Brock Akil

- Genre: Comedy drama; Sports drama
- Created by: Mara Brock Akil
- Starring: Wendy Raquel Robinson; Hosea Chanchez; Vaughn W. Hebron; Adriyan Rae; Analisa Velez; Toby Sandeman
- Theme music composer: Kurt Farquhar; Def Jef; James D. Joiner III
- Country of origin: United States
- Original language: English
- No. of seasons: 2
- No. of episodes: 20

Production
- Executive producers: Michael Platt; Mara Brock Akil; Salim Akil; Kelsey Grammer; Wendy Raquel Robinson; Devon Greggory; Tom Russo; Jordan McMahon; James Bitonti
- Producers: Dan Dugan; Ken Farrington; Bobbi Sue Luther; Patrick L. Coleman; Hosea Chanchez
- Production locations: Atlanta, Georgia
- Editors: Jamin Bricker; Jean Crupper; Paul Fontaine
- Camera setup: Single-camera
- Running time: 28–30 minutes
- Production companies: Inphiniti Entertainment; Akil Productions; Grammnet Productions; CBS Studios

Original release
- Network: Paramount+
- Release: November 11, 2021 – February 9, 2023

Related
- The Game (2006)

The Game is an American comedy drama television series created by Mara Brock Akil. It premiered on Paramount+ on November 11, 2021, as a revival and sequel series based on her 2006–2015 series of the same name which aired on The CW and then BET. In June 2023, the series was canceled after two seasons.

== Premise ==
The series relocates from San Diego to Las Vegas and sees new players offer a modern-day examination of Black culture through the prism of American pro football. The team tackles issues like racism, sexism, classism and more as they fight for fame, fortune, respect and love – all while trying to maintain their souls as they each play The Game.

== Cast ==
=== Main ===
- Wendy Raquel Robinson as Tasha Mack
- Hosea Chanchez as Malik Wright
- Vaughn W. Hebron as Jamison Fields
- Adriyan Rae as Brittany Pitts
- Analisa Velez as Raquel Navarro
- Toby Sandeman as Garrett Evans

=== Recurring ===
- Tim Daly as Colonel Ulysses S. Thatcher (seasons 1–2)
- Rockmond Dunbar as Pookie
- Asiyih N'Dobe as Kai Mack
- Cecil Blutcher as Caleb Antwan Jones (season 1)
- Ben Davis as Nelson Evans (season 2)
- Derrick A. King as Xavier Mitchell (season 2)
- Bryan Earl as Smoke (season 2)
- Keisha Tillis as Lula Fields (season 2)

=== Guest stars ===
- Pooch Hall as Derwin Davis (season 1)
- Coby Bell as Jason Pitts (seasons 1–2)
- Barry Floyd as Tee-Tee (season 2)

== Episodes ==
=== Series overview ===
Season	Episodes	Originally released	
Season	Episodes	First released	Last released
1	10	November 11, 2021	January 6, 2022
2	10	December 15, 2022	February 9, 2023

=== Season 1 (2021–22) ===
No. overall	No. in season	Title	Directed by	Written by	Original release date
1	1	"A Taste of Vegas (Part 1)"	Kevin Bray	Devon Greggory	November 11, 2021
Picking up six years later, the gang is relocated to Las Vegas. Tasha, who is now married to Pookie and raising their daughter Kai, is now managing the Las Vegas Fighting Fury is set to recruit running back Jamison Fields. Jamison works as a stripper at Local 51 and is focusing on getting his life back together after serving a three-year stint in prison resulting from the parents of his high school girlfriend accusing him of statutory rape (he was 18, she was 16). Malik, who dreams of becoming an owner of the Fighting Fury, is derailed when he is asked to become a quarterback for one more year and Brittany, a recent college graduate, is living her life with her college friends "828" when she learns that she is in complete debt. Her landlord later repossesses her condo along with all of her stuff when her friend Raquel hits her up to come hang out in Vegas where she connects with Jamison.
2	2	"A Taste of Vegas (Part 2)"	Kevin Bray	Brian Egeston	November 11, 2021
Malik gets pulled over by the police until he is saved by Jamison, striking up a friendship between the two. Malik also comes to the terms of coping with his friend Caleb's loss and visit him at his gravesite only to find out that he is hallucinating a ghost version of Caleb. Tasha finds out that Garrett Evans is drafted into the Fighting Fury. Malik agrees to start his position as quarterback. Brittany takes on a job as Tasha's assistant in order to pay back her student loans.
3	3	"The Diva Went Down to Georgia"	Kevin Bray	Brian Egeston	November 18, 2021
4	4	"White Party, White People, White Lies"	Peter O'Fallon	Sharde Miller	November 25, 2021
5	5	"Take One For the Team"	Angela Tortu	Maiya Williams	December 2, 2021
6	6	"New Whips, Same Chains"	Ali LeRoi	Darryl Wesley	December 9, 2021
7	7	"It's a Hard Block Life"	Ali LeRoi	Alessia Costantini	December 16, 2021
8	8	"Snips, Clips, and Chair Sits"	Kelly Park	Alesia Etinoff	December 23, 2021
9	9	"Health, Wealth, and Cards Dealt"	Jen McGowan	Shawn Tina Willis	December 30, 2021
10	10	"Reshuffling the Deck"	Peter O'Fallon	Barry Safchik & Michael Platt	January 6, 2022

=== Season 2 (2022–23) ===
No. overall	No. in season	Title	Directed by	Written by	Original release date
11	1	"Once Upon a Time on Draft Day"	Peter O'Fallon	Devon Greggory	December 15, 2022
12	2	"Crash Landing"	Peter O'Fallon	Alessia Costantini	December 15, 2022
13	3	"The Calm Before the Strike"	Kelly Park	Darryl Wesley	December 22, 2022
14	4	"Swindlers List"	Kelly Park	Brian Egeston	December 29, 2022
15	5	"Crossing Lines"	Ali LeRoi	Maiya Williams	January 5, 2023
16	6	"Ocean's 8-2-8"	Ali LeRoi	Alesia Etinoff	January 12, 2023
17	7	"Here Comes the Sun"	Hosea Chanchez	Curran Sullivan	January 19, 2023
18	8	"One Wedding and a Musical"	Richie Keen	Shardé Miller	January 26, 2023
On the morning of Tee-Tee's wedding, Jamison finds a pill lost in his clothing after admitting to Brittany his omission of pain killing drugs, he sneakily takes it which quickly leads him into hallucinations of everyone around him breaking out in song as a whimsy musical. Malik goes on a music video apology tour of his past infidelity dealings. Tasha gets physical treatment for her fibroids. Tee-Tee marries his long time girlfriend, Ally. Original songs performed: "I'm Sorry" (Malik Wright) "Weddings Are Magic" (Brittany, Raquel and Garrett), "Cure for Fear" (Tasha Mack), "Trust Issues" (Malik and Garrett feat. Raquel & Brittany), "Mama Knows Best" (Tasha & Malik) "Rom Com (Wrote the Book on Love)" (The Game Cast Ensemble). "Forever" (Raquel). Cover of "Taps (Day is Done)" performed by Brittany Pitts.
19	9	"Fear & Loathing in Las Vegas"	Gina Lamar	Barry Safchik & Michael Platt	February 2, 2023
20	10	"A League of Their Own"	Devon Greggory	Devon Greggory	February 9, 2023

== Production ==
=== Development ===
In December 2019, it was announced that a revival of The Game was in the works at The CW. The new incarnation, to be written by original series creator Mara Brock Akil and Devon Greggory, would have had a new East Coast setting while allowing original cast members to return. Greggory would serve as showrunner and also executive produce the follow-up series with Akil's fellow original executive producers, Salim Akil and Kelsey Grammer, as well as Tom Russo. However, The CW announced in January 2020 that they would not be moving forward with the series.

In September 2020, it was announced that CBS All Access would be developing a sequel series to The Game ahead of its relaunch as Paramount+ in 2021. The series was officially green-lit in May 2021, with Hosea Chanchez and Wendy Raquel Robinson to reprise their respective roles and the setting was relocated to Las Vegas.

On February 1, 2022, Paramount+ renewed the series for a second season with a 10-episode ordered. Production of the second season began on August 8, 2022. The second season premiered on December 15, 2022.

=== Cancellation ===
On June 23, 2023, it was announced that the series was canceled after two seasons. On June 26, 2023, The Game was removed from Paramount+.

=== Casting ===
In July 2021, it was reported that the new cast members would be Vaughn W. Hebron as Jamison Fields, an undrafted free agent, Adriyan Rae as Brittany Pitts, Jason and Kelly Pitts' daughter, (previous portrayed by Katlynn Simone), Analisa Velez as Raquel Navarro, Brittany's best friend, and Toby Sandeman who had been later cast as Garrett Evans, an American football player who was drafted from a St. Louis team to the Las Vegas Fury. Tia Mowry-Hardrict, who was cast in Netflix's Family Reunion, made a TikTok video expressing that she will most likely not return to her 2 roles of Sister, Sister and The Game. While being honored at the Ebony 'Power 100', she was interviewed by Entertainment Tonight saying: “You know what’s so funny? Never say never. I mean, as it stands for right now, we aren’t in any talks or communication about me coming back to the show...I know it seems kind of weird, because I’m like, the only one, but you know, Melanie, I loved playing that character, and if everything works out, and if everything works out the way that it should, then who knows? I might be on the show.”

== Release ==
The first two episodes were released on November 11, 2021, with subsequent episodes released weekly until January 6, 2022, on Paramount+. The second season premiered on December 15, 2022, with two new episodes available immediately and followed by a new episode on a weekly basis. The first episode aired on BET on February 16, 2022.

== Reception ==
Joe Keller, a 'stream it or skip it' critic of the review section Decider of the New York Post states "The return of The Game carries on what made the original series so popular: Well-written characters dealing with real issues". He continues, "If you’re expecting gut-busting laughs, then you didn’t watch the later seasons of the original series (seasons 4-9), which veered more towards drama than anything else. There’s enough that’s funny to generate some chuckles here and there, but the show then and now is character-driven, and Greggory and his writers have done a good job creating new compelling characters."

Stacey Yvonne, Black Girl Nerds wrote: "The Game has made all the right moves and delivers a set a of entertaining premiere episodes for old fans and new viewers...the setup is less sitcom-like and more comedic drama. Gone are the multicam shots with room for punchlines and laughs, instead we’re treated to hard hitting and heartfelt situations infused with the type of biting humor The Game is known for...Even though it is a sequel, it’s also an evolution." She continues, "This reboot is faithful, well thought out, and well produced, it's definitely worth tuning in."

The television news outlet TVLine listed Hosea Chanchez as an 'Honorable mention' in their Performer of the Week review in January 2022 citing: "Chanchez has been a force throughout the season, uncovering a more vulnerable side...The actor really drove it home in the season finale, which saw Malik experience an emotional breakdown after finally being honest with himself about what he was going through". They concluded, "We have to applaud Chanchez for breathing fresh new life into a character he’s played for more than a decade-plus an outstanding turn that made us love Malik even more than we already did." A poll was also taken from readers on their season finale recap article early January on how they would grade the finale. The poll was generally favored 65.53% with the grade "A" (excellent) with more than 270 votes out of 412 voting margin.
