= Wendy Raquel Robinson =

American actress (born 1967)

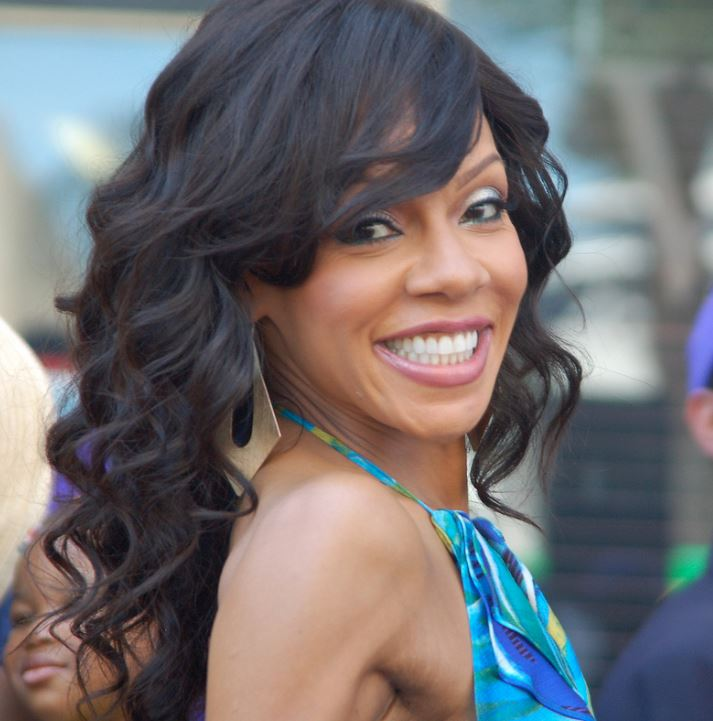
- Robinson in 2013
- Born: July 25, 1967 (age 59); Los Angeles, California, U.S.
- Other name: Wendy Robinson
- Education: Howard University (BFA)
- Occupation: Actress
- Years active: 1992–present
- Spouse: Marco Perkins (m. 2003; div. 2018)

Wendy Raquel Robinson (born July 25, 1967) is an American actress. She is best known for her roles as high school principal Regina "Piggy" Grier on The WB comedy sitcom The Steve Harvey Show (1996–2002), and as sports agent Tasha Mack on The CW/BET/Paramount+ comedy-drama The Game (2006–2015, 2022–2023).

== Early life and education ==
Robinson was born in Los Angeles, California. She attended Howard University, where she graduated cum laude with a Bachelor of Fine Arts in drama.

== Career ==
Robinson made her acting debut in 1993 on an episode of Martin. That same year, she guest starred on episodes of Thea and The Sinbad Show.

From 1995 to 1996, Robinson co-starred on the short-lived NBC sitcom Minor Adjustments, starring Rondell Sheridan. She then won the role of Regina "Piggy" Grier in The WB sitcom The Steve Harvey Show which aired for six seasons. After the series ended its run in 2002, Robinson appeared on the short-lived sketch comedy series Cedric the Entertainer Presents with her former Steve Harvey co-star Cedric the Entertainer. She also made guest appearances on The Parkers, All of Us, and The New Adventures of Old Christine. Robinson has also appeared in several films including The Walking Dead, followed by roles in A Thin Line Between Love and Hate (1996), Ringmaster (1998), Two Can Play That Game (2001), and Rebound (2005). In 2000, she played Miss California in the film Miss Congeniality.

In 2006, Robinson began portraying the role of Tasha Mack, in the comedy The Game. After three seasons, the series was canceled by The CW in May 2009. BET struck a deal with The Game's parent company CBS to develop new episodes of the series, relocating taping of the show from Los Angeles to Atlanta, and announcing its renewal at the April 2010 upfronts.

The Game returned to the air for a fourth season on January 11, 2011. The series ended in 2015. Robinson appeared in ABC's medical drama Grey's Anatomy in 2010. In 2014, she was cast as Cruella de Vil in the Disney's Descendants. In 2017, she appeared in the film Flatliners, and had a recurring role on the short-lived ABC comedy series, The Mayor.

In 2018, Robinson was cast in the ABC comedy-drama series Grand Hotel opposite Demián Bichir and Roselyn Sánchez. In 2022, she featured in the Netflix series Family Reunion as Joyce. She also played in The Chi television show Season 7 (episode 8).

== Philanthropy ==
In 1996, Robinson co-founded the Amazing Grace Conservatory, a school that predominantly serves children from 5 to 18 years old from disadvantaged socioeconomic backgrounds in the fields of the arts and media production. Robinson serves as the school's artistic director. The school has provided a safe haven and training for thousands of young people. Some notable members include Issa Rae, Rhyon Nicole Brown, and Elle Varner.

== Personal life ==
Robinson was initiated as an honorary member of Sigma Gamma Rho sorority during the organization’s Centennial Boulé in July 2022.

== Filmography ==
=== Film ===
Year	Title	Role	Notes
1994	M.A.N.T.I.S.	Ndiaye, Hawkins' Assistant	TV movie
1995	The Walking Dead	Celeste	
1995	Seven Thirty-Five	Dana	Short
1996	A Thin Line Between Love and Hate	Gwen	
1998	Ringmaster	Starletta	
2000	Miss Congeniality	Leslie Davis, Miss California	
2001	Two Can Play That Game	Karen	
2002	A Baby Blues Christmas Special	Josie/Madge (voice)	TV short
2003	With or Without You	Serena	
2003	Mind Games	Natalie, the Hairstylist	
2004	Reflections: A Story of Redemption	Maya	Short
2005	Squirrel Man	Sonya Wendell	Short
2005	Rebound	Jeanie Ellis	
2006	Something New	Cheryl	
2008	Peaches	Peaches	Video
2009	Contradictions of the Heart	Kim	Video
2010	When the Lights Go Out	Sheila	Video
2011	35 and Ticking	Callise	
2011	He's Mine Not Yours	Sophia	
2014	My Dad's a Soccer Mom	Holly Casey	TV movie
2015	Mysterious Ways	Marilyn	
2015	Descendants	Cruella de Vil	TV movie
2015	I'll Text You	Cindy	Short
2016	A Weekend with the Family	Nip Stankershet	
2016	Sugar	Mimi	Short
2016	Grandma's House	Cynthia	
2016	Boy Bye	Veronica Love	
2017	Flatliners	Mrs. Jean Manning	
2018	Revival!	Woman With Blood Issue	
2019	Hip Hop Holiday	Paris	
2020	The Sin Choice	–	
2020	A Christmas Surprise	Tanya	TV movie
2021	Fruits of the Heart	Ella	
2021	A Christmas Family Reunion	Mona Christmas	TV movie
2022	Remember Me: The Mahalia Jackson Story	Cylestine	

=== Television ===
Year	Title	Role	Notes
1992	The New WKRP in Cincinnati	Stacey	Episode: "Strange Bedfellows"
1993	Martin	Vanessa Tucker	Episode: "Really, Gina Is Not My Lover"
1993	The Sinbad Show	Yvette	Episode: "Pilot"
1993	Thea	Patrice Washington	Episode: "Artie's Party"
1994	Dream On	Tiffany	Episode: "The Homecoming Queen"
1994	Me and the Boys	Amelia	Episode: "Pilot"
1994	Sisters	Mannequin #2	Episode: "Scandalous"
1995	The Watcher	Wendy	Episode: "Pilot"
1995	Vanishing Son	Linda	Episode: "Long Ago and Far Away"
1995–96	Minor Adjustments	Rachel Aimes	Main Cast
1996	NYPD Blue	Lucy Kinley	Episode: "Closing Time" & "He's Not Guilty, He's My Brother"
1996–2002	The Steve Harvey Show	Regina "Piggy" Grier	Main Cast
1998	Getting Personal	Kaylene	Recurring Cast
2000–02	Baby Blues	Josie (voice)	Recurring Cast
2002	Yes, Dear	Andrea	Episode: "Greg's New Friend"
2002	Cedric the Entertainer Presents	Various Characters	Main Cast
2002–03	The Proud Family	Katanga/Leslie (voice)	Episode: "Behind Family Lines" & "Hooray for Iesha"
2003	Pyramid	Herself/Celebrity Contestant	Recurring Guest
2003	The Parkers	Dr. Shepherd	Episode: "The Accidental Therapist"
2004–05	All of Us	Sarah Willis	Recurring Cast: Season 2
2006	The New Adventures of Old Christine	Anita	Episode: "The Other F Word"
2006	Girlfriends	Tasha Mack	Episode: "The Game"
2006–15	The Game	Tasha Mack	Main Cast
2007	Family Guy	Jackée Harry/Bernice (voice)	Episode: "Believe It or Not, Joe's Walking on Air"
2009	Played by Fame	Herself	Episode: "Wendy Raquel Robinson" & "Kevin's Child's Play"
2010	Grey's Anatomy	Officer Gina Thompson	Episode: "Sympathy for the Parents"
2010–11	Glenn Martin, DDS	Hair Dresser/Professor Randall (voice)	Episode: "Courtney's Pony" & "Date with Destiny"
2012	Malibu Country	Joan	Episode: "Pilot"
2013	Kimmie's Kitchen	Herself	Episode: "Sweet Potato Pie/Wendy Raquel Robinson"
2015	Unsung Hollywood	Herself	Episode: "Vivica A. Fox"
2015	Teens Wanna Know	Herself	Episode: "2015 Hollywood Award Season"
2015	Being	Herself	Episode: "Wendy Raquel Robinson"
2016	Here We Go Again	Loretta Walker	Main Cast
2017	Tia Mowry at Home	Herself	Episode: "Game On"
2017	Detroiters	Councilwoman Rachel Gwinett	Episode: "Sam the Man"
2017	The Mayor	Krystal	Recurring Cast
2018	Hollywood and African Prestigious Awards	Herself/Host	Main Host
2018	Raven's Home	Dreamweaver	Episode: "Weirder Things"
2018–19	Dear White People	Tina White	Guest Cast: Season 2–3
2018–19	For Evan's Sake	Dr. Cynthia King-Watkins	Main Cast
2019	Annual Trumpet Awards	Herself/Co-Host	Main Co-Host
2019	Annual African Pride Gospel SuperFest	Herself/Host	Main Host
2019	Grand Hotel	Helen "Mrs. P" Parker	Main Cast
2020	Celebrity Game Face	Herself	Episode: "Sweatsuit Charades and Donut Holes"
2020	Cherish the Day	Dr. Coral LeRose	Episode: "Synopsis"
2020	Two Degrees	Wendy	Episode: "U.B.E.R."
2020–21	Insecure	Lila	Recurring Cast: Season 4, Guest: Season 5
2021	MacGyver	Lauretta Bozer	Episode: "H2O + Orthophosphates + Mission City + Corrosion + Origins"
2021–23	The Game	Tasha Mack	Main Cast
2022	Family Reunion	Joyce	Episode: "Remember When the Raccoon Crashed the Wedding?"
2022	Kid's Crew	Gloria Thomas	Recurring Cast
2024	Poppa's House	Catherine Fulton	Recurring Cast
2025–26	The Chi	Riley Dalton	Recurring Cast: Season 7-8
2026—present	The Varnell Hill Show	Vanessa Tucker/Rachel Perkins	Main role

== Award nominations ==
Year	Award	Category	Work	Result
2000	NAACP Image Awards	Outstanding Supporting Actress in a Comedy Series	The Steve Harvey Show	Nominated
2001	NAACP Image Awards	Outstanding Actress in a Comedy Series	The Steve Harvey Show	Nominated
2002	NAACP Image Awards	Outstanding Actress in a Comedy Series	The Steve Harvey Show	Nominated
2003	NAACP Image Awards	Outstanding Supporting Actress in a Comedy Series	Cedric the Entertainer Presents	Nominated
2008	NAACP Image Awards	Outstanding Supporting Actress in a Comedy Series	The Game	Nominated
2009	NAACP Image Awards	Outstanding Supporting Actress in a Comedy Series	The Game	Nominated
2010	NAACP Image Awards	Outstanding Supporting Actress in a Comedy Series	The Game	Nominated
2012	NAACP Image Awards	Outstanding Actress in a Comedy Series	The Game	Nominated
2013	NAACP Image Awards	Outstanding Actress in a Comedy Series	The Game	Nominated
2014	NAACP Image Awards	Outstanding Actress in a Comedy Series	The Game	Won
2015	NAACP Image Awards	Outstanding Actress in a Comedy Series	The Game	Nominated
