= Jimerson =

Jimerson is a surname. Notable people with the surname include:

- Annette P. Jimerson (born 1966), American Fine Artist who works on a wide variety of media
- Arthur Jimerson (born 1968), former linebacker for the former Los Angeles Raiders of the National Football League
- Charlton Jimerson (born 1979), Major League Baseball outfielder
- Douglas Jimerson, American singer known for his interpretation of Civil War songs
- Jeff Jimerson, Pittsburgh-based singer, best known as the national anthem singer for the Pittsburgh Penguins
- Shane R. Jimerson, professor at the University of California, Santa Barbara

== See also ==
- Benjamin O. Jimerson-Phillips, African American movie producer, director, songwriter, and screenwriter
