= Mya filmography =

List of acting performances

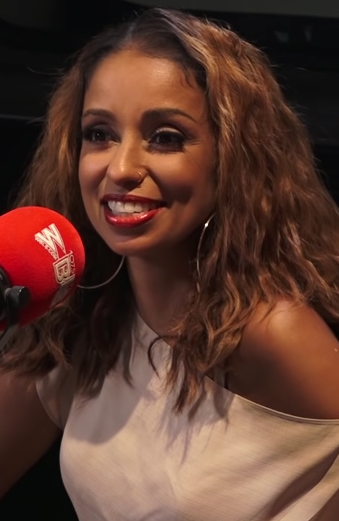
- Feature films: 18
- Theatrical plays: 1
- Television: 30
- Commercials: 5
- Video game: 1

American recording artist and entertainer Mya has worked in eighteen feature films (eleven an actress), seven documentaries, thirty television episodes, one theatrical play, and featured or appeared in five commercials.

Following the success of her debut album Mýa (1998), Mya began reading and receiving movie scripts. Her first foray into acting was Aussie director Michael Rymer's crime action thriller film In Too Deep starring opposite LL Cool J and Omar Epps. She made her cinematic debut with a small role portraying Omar Epps character's girlfriend Loretta. Released August 1999, In Too Deep received generally mixed reviews, but managed to recoup its budget.

In 2002, Mya landed her "most notable" role to date in the Tony Award-winning musical adaptation Chicago. Originally, centered around two 1920s entertainers who get involved in homicide, the film's adaptation of the Broadway musical, under director Rob Marshall's vision was a completely new and stylized version, in which all of the original parts had been rewritten. In the big-screen adaptation, Mya co-starred as Mona, one of the cell block prisoners guilty of murder. The role featured her singing and dancing in a solo section during the "Cell Block Tango" sequence. Prior to securing the role, Mya went through an audition process. At first, reluctant because she had to audition with no script and no tape, however she devised and created a scenario from the description given about the character and improvised the rest winning her the role. After securing the part and with the inclusion of "Lipshitz" now incorporated into the movie, Mya spent two months in Canada in rehearsals working closely with Rob Marshall to perfect her solo monologue and Cell Block Tango dance sequence. Released December 2002, Chicago was a box office hit and grossed 306.8 million worldwide. As well as, critically lauded, the film received 13 Oscar nominations and 8 Golden Globes nomination while winning Mya several awards in the ensemble categories including a Critics' Choice Movie Awards and a Screen Actors Guild Award.

In 2004, Mya had two minor roles–Dirty Dancing: Havana Nights and Shall We Dance?. First, she appeared in Dirty Dancing: Havana Nights. A re-imaging of the 1987 film starring Patrick Swayze, Dirty Dancing: Havana Nights, filmed in Puerto Rico and set in the 1950s follows an American family during the Cuban Revolution. In the film, Mya portrays Lola Martinez, a Tropicana girl-cum-nightclub singer and serenades the crowd during one of the ballroom dance sequence singing "Do You Only Wanna Dance?." A box office bomb, the film grossed $27 million at the box office and received largely negative reviews. Next, Mya appeared in Shall We Dance?, a remake of the 1996 Japanese film of the same name. A tidbit part, Mya portrays Omar Benson Miller's character Vern's fiancée. The singer's most challenging role yet, it required her along with the cast to learn ballroom dance numbers–paso doble, the waltz, the tango and the cha-cha choreographed by choreographer JoAnn Jansen. Released Fall 2004, Shall We Dance? was a box office hit, however received generally mixed reviews.

In February 2005, after going through development hell with reshoots and casting, Mya secured a supporting role in Wes Craven's film Cursed. A horror comedy, Mya co-starred as Jenny Tate, a socialite and best friend to Shannon Elizabeth's character Becky Morton. Excited to work with Wes Craven, during filming and as a suggestion to him, Mya was able to improv her character's big chase scene. When released Cursed tanked at the box office and received overwhelmingly negative reviews. Despite the film's overall box office performance, Mya earned a Best Frightened Performance nomination at 2005 MTV Movie Awards.

The following year in 2006, she co-starred in the romantic comedy drama The Heart Specialist, written, produced and directed by Dennis Cooper, and starred Wood Harris, Zoe Saldaña, and Brian J. White. Originally released under the title Ways of the Flesh, it initially premiered at the 2006 Boston Film Festival however had remain unreleased until 2011, when it was granted a limited theatrical release. Still fairly new to acting, in 2006 as well, Mya was honored with the Crossover Award (singer to actor) at the Palm Beach International Film Festival.

In the latter half of her career, Mya appeared in low budget independent films. Beginning in 2007, she had a minor role in the indie sex comedy The Metrosexual. Starring Shaun Benson in the titular role, she portrays Jessica, an ex-girlfriend. Unreleased and screened at the Boston Film Festival it received mixed reviews. The next year in 2008, Mya received a supporting role in Bill Duke's directed drama thriller Cover where she portrayed an AIDS victim named Cynda. The film dealt with the subject of men who are on the down-low in society and opened at selective theaters. It grossed $79,436 in the United States and received negative reviews. In the same year, Mya landed her first starring role. She starred in the direct-to-dvd romantic comedy Love For Sale. Starring opposite Jackie Long and Jason Weaver, Mya played Kiely, a college student in a bad relationship. Love For Sale was released on DVD October 21, 2008.

The following year in 2009, Mya had supporting role in the comedy drama indie film Bottleworld. Cast as Bree, it featured an ensemble cast of Anna Camp, Christopher Denham and Scott Wilson. In March 2010, she appeared in The Penthouse starring Rider Strong. The sex comedy earned largely negative reviews. Next, Mya starred as Lt. Plummer opposite Linda Hamilton in the Syfy original television movie Bermuda Tentacles. Directed by Nick Lyon the made-for-television film premiered April 12, 2014 and garnered largely negative reviews. Following its years in development hell, in February 2021, Mya had a minor role in the Tubi streaming platform action movie Lazarus. Later that year, she starred in Lifetime original holiday film My Favorite Christmas Melody. She starred as Abby Walker, once a promising singer-songwriter who now finds herself writing uninspired jingles for commercials. As she heads home for the holidays, she's enlisted by the local high school music teacher to help save the school arts program. In the process, Abby rediscovers her voice and regains the confidence to go after her dreams and lets the possibility of love in too. It aired December 5, 2021, a part of Lifetime's It's a Wonderful Lifetime holiday movie event. Returning to the silver screen, in January 2023, Mya made a cameo in the rebooted comedy film House Party. Considered a legitimate supporting role, she appeared as the major love interest for actor Tosin Cole's character Damon. House Party received largely mixed reviews.

Aside from film appearances, Mya made television appearances as well. In 2004 and 2005, she guest starred on television series 1-800-Missing and NCIS. In 2009, she competed in the ninth season of Dancing with the Stars. A fan favorite among viewers, she earned the runner-up title in the competition. For two seasons, she starred in the ALLBLK television drama 5th Ward The Series. Based on director Greg Carter's first movie of the same name, Mya starred as Mina Kennedy, a single mother raising her three sons in Houston's historic district Fifth Ward. In 2019, she made her first foray into reality television and appeared in the Vh1 show Girls Cruise alongside Lil' Kim and Chilli of TLC.

== Feature films ==
Key
†	Indicates a cameo appearance
‡	Indicates a documentary appearance

Mya film appearances
Year	Title	Role	Credit(s)	Ref.
1999	In Too Deep	Loretta	Actress	
2002	Chicago	Mona	Actress	
2003	Volcano High	Jade	Voice Actress	
2003	The Blues	Herself ‡	Appearance	
2004	Dirty Dancing: Havana Nights	Lola Martinez	Actress	
2004	Shall We Dance?	Vern's Fiancée	Actress	
2004	Freestyle With Brian Friedman	Herself‡	Appearance	
2005	Cursed	Jenny Tate	Actress	
2007	The Metrosexual	Jessica	Actress	
2008	Cover	Cynda	Actress	
2008	Love For Sale	Keiley	Actress	
2009	Bottleworld	Bree	Actress	
2010	The Penthouse	Mitra	Actress	
2011	The Heart Specialist	Valerie	Actress	
2012	Sunset Strip	Herself ‡	Appearance	
2014	Bermuda Tentacles	Lt. Plummer	Actress	
2017	Vegan Roundtable^{[A]}	Herself‡	Appearance	
2018	Changing the Game^{[B]}	Herself‡	Appearance	
2019	Slice of Life:The Future of Food	Herself‡	Appearance	
2021	Lazarus	Flora	Actress	
2021	They're Trying To Kill Us	Herself‡	Appearance	
2021	My Favorite Christmas Melody	Abby	Actress	
2023	House Party	Herself†	Actress	
2025	Lilith Fair: Building a Mystery	Herself‡	Appearance	

== Short films ==
Mya short film work
Year	Title	Role	Medium	Notes	Ref.
2024	Voices of Hope – Words of Wisdom by Dr. Jane Goodall	Herself	Theatrical	Appearance; Narrator	
2026	Voices of Hope – Words of Wisdom by Ram Dass	Herself	–	Narrator	

== Theatrical plays ==
Mya stage work
Year	Title	Role	Playwright	Stage	Ref.
2008	Chicago^{[C]}	Velma Kelly	Fred Ebb; Bob Fosse	Ambassador Theatre	

== Television ==
Mya television appearances
Year	Title	Role	Episode	Notes	Ref.
1999	Sister, Sister	Herself	"FreakNik"	Guest Appearance	
1999	All That	Herself	"All That Live!" (100th Episode)	Host	
1999	Figure It Out	Herself	"Tickled Lizard with Feather to Win Race/Won Best Trick with Snoring Dog"	Panelist	
1999	FANatic	Herself	"Mya/Mary J. Blige"	Appearance	
2001	2GE+HER: The Series	Herself	"Lyrics"	Guest Appearance	
2001	Making the Video	Herself	"Lady Marmalade"	Appearance	
2002	Haunted	Voodoo Priest	"Abby"	Actress	
2002	VH-1 Behind the Movie	Herself	"Chicago"	Appearance	
2003	Punk'd	Herself	"Mya/Katie Holmes/Tracy Morgan"	Appearance	
2003	MADtv	Herself	Season 9, Episode 9	Guest Appearance	
2003	Making the Video	Herself	"My Love Is Like...Wo"	Appearance	
2003	Access Granted	Herself	"Fallen"	Appearance	
2004	1-800-Missing	Kira	"Pop Star"	Actress	
2004	Beat Seeker	Herself	Season 2, Episode 16	Appearance	
2005	NCIS	Samantha "Jade" King	"Pop Life"	Actress	
2006	Love Monkey	Herself	"Coming Out"	Guest Appearance	
2006	TV Land's Top Ten	Herself	"Top Ten Musical Moments"	Appearance	
2007	Yo Gabba Gabba!	Herself	"Friends"	Guest Appearance	
2008	Secret Talents of the Stars	Herself	"Pilot"	Contestant	
2009	Dancing with the Stars	Herself	Season 9	Contestant	
2009	Cubed	Herself	Season 1, Episode 4	Appearance	
2010	The Real Housewives of D.C.	Herself	"Welcome to the District"	Guest Appearance	
2010	Biography	Herself	P!nk	Appearance	
2011	WWE Raw	Herself	"The Rock's Birthday Bash"	Special Guest	
2017	Display	Herself	"Display 309"	Appearance	
2018	Do or Dare	Herself	"T.I. Vs Mya"	Contestant	
2018	Gods of Medicine	Jackie Garrett	Heaven Can Wait...	Actress	
2018	5th Ward The Series	Mina Kennedy	2 Seasons	Actress	
2019	Girls Cruise	Herself	1 Season	Appearance	
2022	Shark Tank	Herself	Candi	Guest Appearance; Helper	

== Commercials ==
Mya in commercials
Year	Company	Promoting	Title	Theme song(s)	Region	Ref.
1999	MTV	Music videos	"Keep It Real"	—N/a	International	
2003	The Coca-Cola Company	Soft drink beverage	"Coca-Cola...Real"	"Compared to What"	International	
2003	Gap	Clothing	"Fit to feel groovy—GapStretch—the new pants"	"Feelin' Groovy"	International	
2003	Pantene	Pro-voice contest	—N/a	—N/a	International	
2005	Motorola	Motorola rokr	"Phone Booth"	"Hung Up"	International	
2011	NBC Universal^{[D]}	Bravo	"Fashion By Bravo"	"Fabulous Life"	International	
2013	Ford Motor Company^{[E]}	Ford Focus	—N/a	"Break Your Neck"	International	

== Video game ==
Mya video game appearance
Year	Title	Role	Credit(s)	Ref.
2004	James Bond 007: Everything or Nothing	Mya Starling	Voice Actress	

== See also ==
- Mya discography
- Mya videography
- List of Mya live performances
- List of songs recorded by Mya

== Notes ==
^{A} A short video documentary where Waka Flocka Flame, Russell Simmons and Mya discuss why they decided to adopt a vegan lifestyle.
^{B} A short video documentary with multiple female celebrities discussing the importance of vegan fashion.
^{C} Due to unfortunate circumstances, Mya had to postpone her Broadway debut after she incurred a broken foot. Her stint was to began May 12, 2008 to July 13, 2008 at the Ambassador theatre.
^{D} NBC Universal licensed "Fabulous Life" to promote their Fashion By Bravo campaign.
^{E} The Ford Motor Company licensed "Break Your Neck" to promote its 2013 Ford Focus.

Awards and achievements
Preceded by Gilles Marini & Cheryl Burke	Dancing with the Stars (US) runner up Season 9 (Fall 2009 with Dmitry Chaplin)	Succeeded by Evan Lysacek & Anna Trebunskaya
