= 5th Ward =

5th Ward or Fifth Ward may refer to one of the following places:

- Fifth Ward, Houston, a neighborhood of Houston
- 5th Ward of New Orleans, a ward of New Orleans
- Fifth Ward (Atlanta), a historical ward of Atlanta
- Fifth Ward, Louisiana, a census-designated place in Avoyelles Parish
- Fifth Ward, Philadelphia, a ward of Philadelphia
- 5th ward, Chicago, an aldermanic ward of Chicago
- Ward 5 (Mississauga), a municipal ward in Mississauga, Ontario
- Ward 5, St. Louis City, an aldermanic ward of St. Louis
- Ward 5, one of the neighborhoods of Washington, D.C.
- Ward 5, the name of several wards of Zimbabwe
- West Carleton-March Ward, Ottawa (also known as Ward 5)
- Dolores, Caibarién, Cuba, ward 5 of Caibarién

== Other uses ==
- Fifth Ward (film), a 1997 drama film
  - 5th Ward The Series, a 2018 television series based on the film
- Fifth Ward Democrats, American football team
