= Thug Life (2001 film) =

2001 American crime drama film by Greg Carter

- Directed by: Greg Carter
- Written by: Greg Carter; Keith Kjornes
- Produced by: Greg Carter
- Starring: Willie D; Napoleon; Lady of Rage; Roy Fegan; Thomas Miles; Junie Hoang
- Cinematography: Mark David
- Edited by: David Parmenter
- Music by: Kentha Stephens
- Distributed by: Madacy Entertainment; York Entertainment
- Release date: March 8, 2001
- Running time: 90 minutes
- Country: United States
- Language: English

Thug Life is a 2001 American crime drama film written, produced, and directed by Greg Carter. Thug Life features hip-hop and reggae artists Vybz Kartel, Willie D, The Lady of Rage, and Napoleon.

== Plot ==
A young man trying to grow up straight in a crime-ridden neighborhood finds himself on the run after a friend accidentally lures him into a trap in this hard-edged urban drama. Boo grew up in a rough section of Houston, Texas, where many see crime as their only way out. Boo is determined to leave the street life behind and build an honest career for himself as a plumber, but his longtime friend Mecca talks Boo into helping him out as he tries to sell a stolen vehicle. Things don't go as planned, and when shots ring out, Boo and Mecca discover they've been framed for the murder of a gang leader and have to get out of Houston at once if they are to stand any chance of surviving the night.

== Cast ==
- Thomas Miles – Boo
- Gregory O. Stewart – Mecca
- Napoleon – Vee
- Franklyn J. Anderson – old man / snitch
- Willie D – Isaac
- Roy Fegan – Damon
- Johnathan Gwyn – Chacho
- Junie Hoang – Nurse
- Lady of Rage – Ami
- Jalene Mack – Mecca's aunt a.k.a. Ms. Johnson
- Bruce Lee Wynn – Willard

== Production ==
Thug Life draws partial influence from The Warriors, a 1979 film. It had a budget of less than $100,000. It was produced by York Productions. The film's director, Greg Carter, felt the producers issued a cut he felt was less polished than he had preferred, saying, "They just wanted something they could put in a box and sell." Theaters in several cities showed Thug Life at the end of 2000. Filming took place in Third Ward, Houston.

== Reception ==
Film Review said, "Popular (?) rappers Willie D, Lady of the Rage and Napoleon lead the cast of this formula melodrama, which has nothing new to say about Black America's urban strife."

== Legacy ==
According to the Houston Press, the film performed well in the video rental market and during its Showtime run. The film's performance led to Carter's receiving multiple opportunities to create "urban action" movies aimed at the expanding direct-to-video industry. Thug Life solidified Carter's inclination to using Houston's inner city as a backdrop in his subsequent films.

Through his newly formed company Nexus Interactive Active, Carter inked an agreement with Revo-Groove International to create a video game and flash animation series based on the film. Designed by Mike Phillips, the animated series was scheduled to be released on March 27, 2001. The series had 10 episodes and featured excerpts from the film.
