= 5th Ward The Series =

US television program

- Genre: Drama
- Created by: Greg Carter
- Based on: Fifth Ward by Greg Carter
- Directed by: Greg Carter
- Starring: Mýa; Carl Anthony Payne; Omar Gooding; Carter Redwood; Chris O'Neal; Gary Sturgis; Reginald T. Dorsey; Lew Temple
- Theme music composer: Charlie Mac
- Composer: Scott Szabo
- Country of origin: United States
- Original language: English
- No. of seasons: 2
- No. of episodes: 12

Production
- Executive producers: Traci Otey Blunt; Greg Carter; Derrick "D-Reck" Dixon; Bob Johnson; Angela Northington; Marchris G. Robinson; Dominique Telson; Peyv Raz; Eduard Osipov
- Producers: Greg Carter; Dominique Telson; Jalene Mack; Junie Hoang; Shawn McElveen
- Production location: Fifth Ward, Houston
- Cinematography: Daphne Qin Wu
- Editor: Sean Henderson
- Running time: 60 minutes
- Production company: Nexus Films Entertainment

Original release
- Network: Allblk
- Release: March 2, 2018 – September 3, 2020

5th Ward The Series is an American television drama series developed by director Greg Carter that aired on Allblk from March 2, 2018, to September 3, 2020. The series is based on director Greg Carter's first movie Fifth Ward (1997). It is centered around the life of Mina, a single mother of two struggling to make ends meet; as well as several additional locals and town officials residing in the historical district of Houston's Fifth Ward and serves as a prequel with season one consisting of six episodes airing weekly. It stars Carl Anthony Payne and Mýa with a feature ensemble cast of Brittany Bullock, Corr Kendricks, Nephew Tommy, Christopher Jefferson, Chris O'Neal, Gary Sturgis and Lew Temple. 5th Ward The Series along with other UMC's original series had a preview screening at the 26th Annual Pan African Film Festival on February 10, 2018. The series was renewed for a second season which premiered on July 30, 2020.

== Background ==
Fifth Ward was indie director Greg Carter's first feature film which he wrote, produced, edited, and shot on 35mm. It won awards at a number of festivals, but had a mixed reception when selected into the SXSW Film Festival. The movie was later distributed by York/Maverick Entertainment and released nationwide in March 2000 to Blockbuster and Hollywood Video.

== Synopsis ==
"In Houston's historically black neighborhood known as the "5th Ward," long-time resident, Mina (Mýa), has been struggling to make ends meet – especially since the death of her husband two years ago. Now a single mother of two sons, James and older brother Ray Ray, Mina fears for their safety after an argument at a local convenience store leaves a young girl dead. When James is taken away from her following a police raid on her home that results in the arrest of her new boyfriend, Mina battles with the idealism of remaining on the straight and narrow and the reality of what difficult decisions her circumstances will require her to make."

== Cast and characters ==
=== Main ===
- Mýa as Mina Kennedy – A single mother of three and aspiring singer. Prior to the show, her husband is killed. Mina is a loving, good natured but firm mother who had enjoyed singing on her church's choir until it was discovered she was dancing in the strip club. The church's congregation voted to have her removed from the church. With nothing left, she continues to dance in Blue's night club in order to support her family financially. During Season 1, Mina discovers she's pregnant and contemplates whether or not to keep the baby. In the midst of her dilemma, Mina and Blue become romantically closer and develop feelings for each other. In Season 2, Mina and Blue continue their relationship while awaiting the birth of their first child together. During the season, her and Blue open a jazz night club together as well as rejoin the church's congregation. In the finale, it is uncertain if her and Blue's baby survive after Lexus's revenge plot.
- Christopher Jefferson as Ray Ray Kennedy – Mina's eldest son and a talented, aspiring singer/rapper. He falls in love with Jazmine much to the dismay of his friend, Bam. In Season 2, Ray Ray continues his relationship with Jazmine until it is discovered by her parents and he's arrested for rape allegations. However, he's eventually set free and placed on house arrest after Jazmine's parents and Mina come to an agreement the two will never speak or see each other again. During the season, he meets a new student, Neisha who has a romantic interest in him, much to Jazmine's dismay. In the finale, Ray Ray and Jazmine decides to skip their high school graduation, leave 5th Ward altogether to pursue his music career and elope.
- Nephew Tommy as Robert Kennedy – A police officer, Mina's brother in law and Ray Ray's and James' estranged uncle. Throughout Season 1, Robert has a strained relationship as well with his wife Wanda. In Season 2, he and his partner Sones are under investigation by Internal Affairs after the truce meeting goes awry while awaiting the birth his first baby with his wife Wanda.
- Carl Anthony Payne as Councilman Kendrick Davis – A corrupt, manipulative elected official with hidden, dark secrets and Blue's little brother. During Season 1, Councilman Davis carries on an affair with his one-time office manager, Marcie, and has fathered a child with the local church's reverend's daughter. In Season 2, throughout Councilman Davis is harassed and threatened by an array of messages. It is revealed in a flashback, crooked police officer Gibson planted and set him up for the death of the reverend's daughter Tina.
- Chris O'Neal as Bam – Ray Ray's friend and aspiring rapper. He doesn't approve of Ray Ray's relationship with Jazmine. In Season 2, Bam discovers a family secret after the death of his grandmother. It is revealed one time crime boss Seth is Bam's biological father. He's in a relationship with Jazmine's friend Jaylene.
- Gary Sturgis as Odell "Blue" Davis – A club owner with a romantic interest in Mina and Kendrick's older brother. Throughout Season 1, Blue continuously pursues Mina much to the dismay of his now ex-girlfriend Lexus. In Season 2, he continues his relationship with Mina, while awaiting the birth of their first child together. He and Mina decides to open a jazz club and rejoin the church's congregation. In the finale, it is uncertain if him and Mina's baby survive due to his former ex-girlfriend Lexus's revenge plot.
- Lew Temple as Mayor Bob Coletti– A corrupt elect official with a hidden agenda of his own as well.
- Corr Kendricks as Ace – One of Seth's former lackey who betrays Seth during an organized truce meeting against Seth's rivals. He's killed at the end of the season finale. (Season 1)

=== Supporting ===
- Cayden Wilson as James Kennedy – Mina's youngest son and Ray Ray's little brother. A talented, gifted artist as well. In Season 2, he's placed in a juvenile correctional facility for stealing art supplies and carrying a gun to help out with his older brother Ray Ray's bail. Eventually, he's let out after his friend takes the fault for all charges.
- Allison Nguyen as Jazmine Tran – Huong's and Dat Tran's eldest daughter, My Hahn's older sister, and Ray Ray's love interest. She falls in love with Ray Ray and encourages him to continue to do music whenever he begins to doubt himself. Her friends are Jaylene and Darien. In Season 2, Jazmine continues to her relationship with Ray Ray until it is discover by her parents. After her parents convinced her to testify against Ray Ray in court for rape allegations, he's arrested. However, he's eventually set free and placed on house arrest after Jazmine's parents and Mina come to an agreement the two will never speak or see each other again. Consumed by guilt, Jazmine opts to commits suicide but rescued in time by her friends. In the finale, her and Ray Ray skip their high school graduation, leave 5th Ward altogether to pursue Ray Ray's music career and elope.
- Derrick "D-Reck" Dixon as Seth – Fifth Ward's crime boss who owns a chop shop. He's double crossed and shot by his former lackey in the organized truce meeting. In Season 2, it is revealed he is Bam's biological father.
- Louis Gusemano as Greg Sones – Robert's second in command in the police department. Sones and Robert decides to organize a truce meeting between Seth's and Carlos' crew however the truce meeting goes awry and Sones is shot in the crossfire. In Season 2, Sones spent six months in a coma after the truce meeting fiasco and under investigation by Internal Affairs. After his rehabilitation, Robert and him assemble a special task team to decrease gun weaponry in 5th Ward. It is revealed in a flashback, Sones was shot by crooked police officer Gibson at the truce meeting.
- Mandy Carrasco as Allyson Lathan – A local television reporter working with the FBI investigating suspicious activity against Councilman Davis. Unbeknownst, she's married to Lavell, Councilman Davis mysterious protege.
- Junie Hoang as Huong Tran – Jazmine's and My Hahn's strict mother. She doesn't approve of her daughter's relationship with Ray Ray.
- Kendrick Smith as Gibson – A crooked police officer working for the mayor.
- Jalene Mack as Wanda Kennedy – A nurse. She is Robert's wife, Mina's sister in law and Ray Ray's and James' aunt. She and her husband Robert have a strain relationship due to the fact she wants children but he doesn't.
- Brittany "Just Brittany" Bullock as Lexus – Blue's now ex-girlfriend and Mina's former colleague. She develops a personal vendetta against Mina because of Blue's interest in her and decides to sets her up to get date rape at a bachelor's party.
- Golden Rice as Dat Tran – Jazmine's and My Hahn's father. He owns the neighborhood local convenience store.
- Nayeli Escamillia as Lettie Sones – A lawyer and Sones' wife. Her and Sones met while in college and have a daughter.
- Micheal Anthony Jackson as Lavell – Councilman Davis' sneaky, mysterious, and dangerous protege. Unbeknownst, he's married to the local television reporter Alyson and working with the FBI investigating suspicious activity against Councilman Davis.
- Denisha Hardeman as Jaylene Ward – One of Jazmine's friends. She doesn't care for Jazmine and Ray Ray's relationship.
- Michael Myles Hayes as Lil T– Mina's youngest son.

=== Recurring ===
- Leslie Steele as Marcie Wiggins – Councilman Davis' one time office manager and part-time lover. Following her dismissal, she vows to seek revenge against her former lover Councilman Davis.
- Neshia Brathwaite Farhangi as Mrs.Jackson – A CPS worker. (Season 1)
- Savannah Phan as My Hahn Tran – Jazmine's little sister and Huong's and Dat's youngest daughter.
- Tasha Denise as Kiki – Mina's friend and colleague at the strip club.
- Amelia Jefferies as Loretta Davis – Councilman Davis' wife.
- Justin Mabrie as Tony – Mina's incarcerated boyfriend. Mina and Tony share one child together, Little T. He's release from prison at the end of the season finale.
- Mista Roe as Mike Batts – Seth's cousin who is killed by an unknown assailant. (Season 1) It is revealed in Season 2 he was killed by crooked police officer Gibson.
- Cat Tebo as Darien Mack – One of Jazmine's friends.

=== Guest stars ===
- Hawthorne James as John – Mina's father and Ray Ray's and James' grandfather. Mina and her father have a strain, estranged relationship.
- Scarface as OG Jeffrey – an incarcerated inmate with Mina's boyfriend.
- Willie D as FBI Bureau Director Broussard – He's investigating Councilman Davis.
- Golden Brooks as Erica Ward – Jaylene's mother.
- R.J. Atkins as a hospital orderly who finds Detective Sones walking the hallways after waking up from a coma. (Season 2)

== Episodes ==
Season	Episodes	Originally released	
Season	Episodes	First released	Last released
1	6	March 2, 2018	April 6, 2018
2	6	July 30, 2020	September 3, 2020

=== Season 1 (2018) ===
No. overall	No. in season	Title	Directed by	Written by	Original release date
1	1	"Keepin' It Trill"	Greg Carter	Greg Carter	March 2, 2018
Life in Houston's Fifth Ward as seen through the eyes of some of its residents including single mom, Mina (Mýa) and her sons (Jefferson, Wilson). Councilman Davis (Payne) maneuver through political minefields with the Mayor (Temple) and Rev. Parker (Jolivette). Officer Robert Kennedy (Tommy) embraces his past in Fifth Ward after a promotion. The Tran family moves into Fifth Ward. Neighborhood club owner, Blue (Sturgis), makes a romantic move.
2	2	"Da Nickel"	Greg Carter	Greg Carter & Christi Lavarias	March 9, 2018
Mina faces challenges adjusting to her new job facing condemnation from every corner. Robert tries to get closer to his estranged nephews. Mina's son, James, paints a mural. Ray Ray meets Jazmine Tran (Nguyen) and her mother (Hoang) registering at school. Councilman Davis makes a political enemy and has doubts about an office affair with Marcie (Steele), his office manager.
3	3	"Elbows & Vogues"	Greg Carter	Greg Carter & Julie Anne Wight	March 16, 2018
The death of a latino kid on the wrong side of the tracks creates tension. Robert and his next in command, Sones (Gusemano), try to diffuse the problem. Ray Ray and Jazmine fall for each other much to the dismay of Bam (O'Neal) and her friends. Councilman Davis meets reporter Allyson Lathan (Carrasco). Seth's cousin is murdered, his latino counterpart in Fifth Ward and rival Carlos is suspected.
4	4	"Aw' Ready"	Greg Carter	Joe Elmore Jr & Fowzi Abdelsama and Greg Carter	March 23, 2018
Davis breaks it off with Marcie. Robert and Sones try to strategize peace between Carlos and Seth's crews before it escalates further. Mina gets in deeper at her new job working for Blue. Jazmine enters Ray Ray into the H-town Rap Battle.
5	5	"Flossin'"	Greg Carter	Greg Carter & Fowzi Abdelsamad	March 30, 2018
The Mayor makes plans to bring Davis down. Mina and Blue connect. James has a birthday party. Jazmine and her friends attend. Ray Ray and Bam try to get back into the studio.
6	6	"Candy"	Greg Carter	Greg Carter & Richard Dane Scott	April 6, 2018
While Ray Ray and Bam performs in the rap battle. Robert and Sones prepare for the truce meeting. Mina prepares for a new future, Davis is cornered, and Blue takes command.

=== Season 2 (2020) ===
No. overall	No. in season	Title	Directed by	Written by	Original release date
7	1	"LBJ General"	Greg Carter	Greg Carter & Richard Dane Scott	July 30, 2020
Blue and Mina await the birth of their first child together. Davis is forced to make a deal with his rival to avoid going to prison, but people from his past are determined to bring him down. Kennedy and Sones are investigated for staging the massacre at the truce meeting, while Sones remains in a coma. Jazmine and Ray Ray are forced to make difficult decisions.
8	2	"Lyons Ave."	Greg Carter	Greg Carter & Christy Lavalais	August 6, 2020
The untimely death of Anthony Barnes, a black kid in the Fifth Ward, at the hands of police creates tension in the city and Donell X is there to take advantage of the situation. Internal Affairs presses Sones and Kennedy for answers. Blue opens a jazz club but he and Mina face challenges. Ray Ray and Jazmine do a radio interview with dire consequences. Davis faces harassment from an unseen threat.
9	3	"Harris Co. Jail"	Greg Carter	Greg Carter & Fowzi Abdelsamad	August 13, 2020
Robert and Sones build a team to help solve the gun problem in the Fifth Ward. Ray Ray and Jazmine face their biggest challenge yet. Bam's grandmother takes a turn for the worse as he discovers a family secret. Davis meets with a reporter to help solve the mystery of who is plotting against him. Mina plans to sing at the church but Blue is against it.
10	4	"Crane Street"	Greg Carter	Greg Carter & Julie Anne Wight	August 20, 2020
Davis and Loretta meet with an attorney about her adopting Kenyatta. Robert and Sones meet with Chief Lewis. Mina finds her faith but can Blue find his? Jazmine finds herself at her lowest point. James and his best friend Rip find themselves in hot water. Ray Ray meets Neisha, a new student to Wheatley High.
11	5	"Wheatley Wildcats"	Greg Carter	Greg Carter & Denisha Hardeman	August 27, 2020
Mayor Coletti unveils his plans for the new NFL stadium in the Fifth Ward. Mina and Blue find their groove at his new jazz club. Bam tries to adjust to his new family life. Davis comes face to face with a terrifying truth. Jazmine and her friends attend senior prom, while Ray Ray brings Neisha. Lexus makes her move.
12	6	"Liberty Rd."	Greg Carter	Greg Carter	September 3, 2020
Blue is cornered. Kennedy and Sones realize something bigger is happening in 5th Ward. Mina prepares for a new future. Davis and Loretta fight for custody of Kenyatta.

== Production ==
=== Development and conception ===
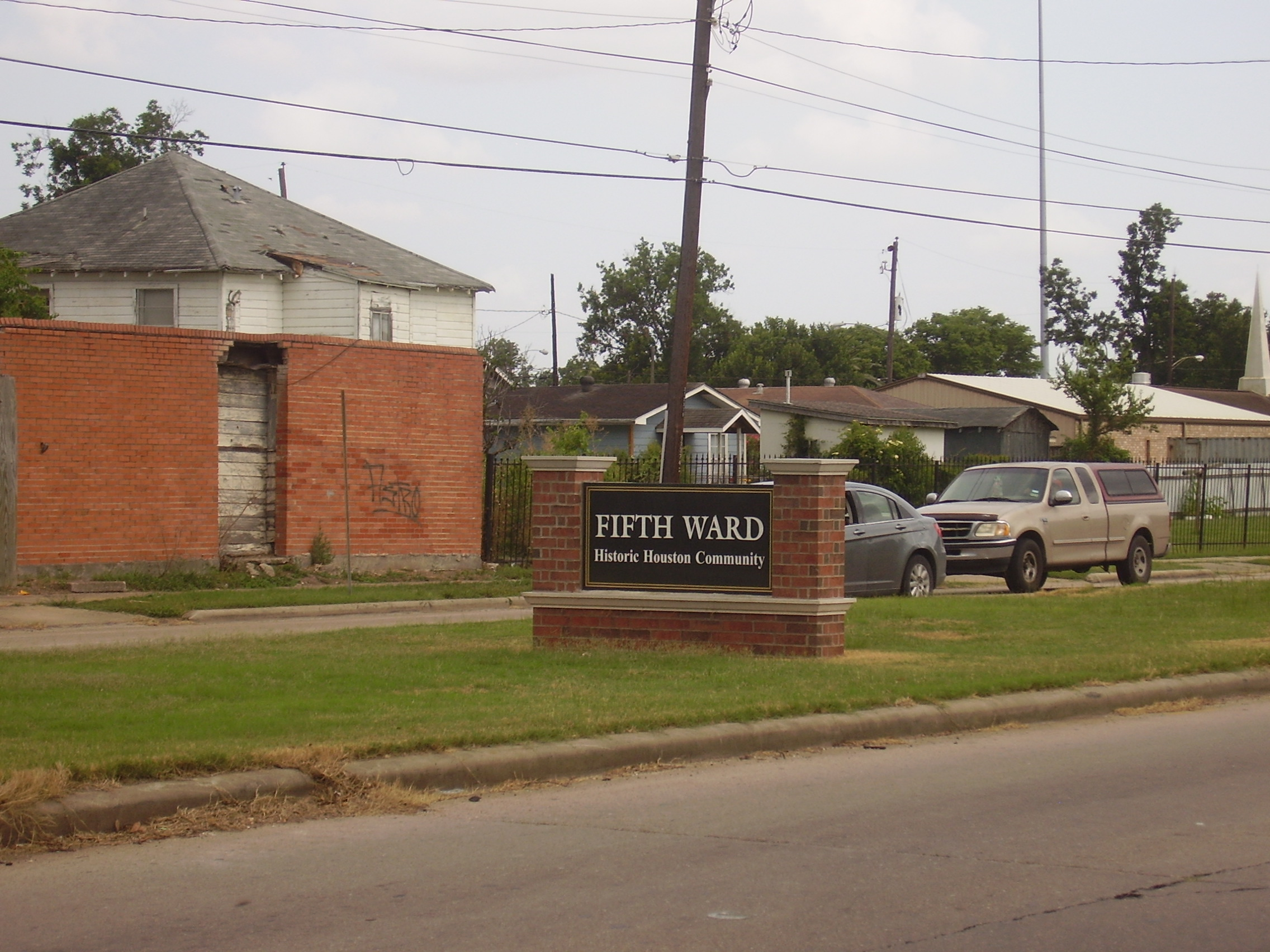

As a longtime resident of Texas, 5th Ward The Series finds Carter expanding on themes from his first feature film – titled Fifth Ward – which he made 20 years ago. The son of a minister, Carter moved to Houston from Arkansas when he was a child. Although he was only in Fifth Ward a short time, the neighborhood left an impression on Carter. Initially, Carter went to Texas A&M University to study engineering, however he took a detour into drama. After the completion of school, Carter was ready to tell his Fifth Ward story. Fifth Ward, Carter's debut film was featured in the SXSW Film Festival and set Carter on a path writing, directing and producing feature films.

Over the years, he kept developing a Fifth Ward story. "I wanted to tell a story that was bigger than just one about being black, about being who I am," he commented. Carter's vision was to capture the oft-changing demographic makeup of a neighborhood with a long history dating back to the end of the Civil War, when it was largely settled by freedmen. For the series, Carter wanted to infuse the show with a feeling of authenticity, so he prefaced his episodes with documentary-style interviews with residents, "people who were models in appearance and story to the four main characters on the show," he commented. "I wanted to give it that feeling, 'This is Houston.' "

Among Carter's storylines are one about a Pakistani family and one about a Vietnamese family. Leading actress Mýa stars in another narrative about a struggling single mother with two sons and aspiring singer. With his series, Carter hopes viewers unfamiliar with the neighborhood's history may find information threaded through the show. For 5th Ward The Series opening credits, Carter combed through archival photos and music, old and new. "If a kid sees it and doesn't know who Mickey Leland is, I hope he'll want to find out," he says of the late congressman. "And the music tells a story, too. I wanted some ragtime in the opening sequence: That feeling of the past going back to Reconstruction and then move it forward to a trap beat like kids would listen to today. I want it to revolve around a vernacular particular to Houston and its culture."

== Music ==
5th Ward Series (Season 1 Original Soundtrack)

Soundtrack album by Various Artists
- Released: March 2, 2018
- Genres: Hip hop; Trap
- Labels: Nexus Entertainment; Coutrá Music Group
- Producers: Scott Szabo; Charlie Mac

Director Greg Carter and his Nexus Entertainment partnered with Melissa Harville-Lebron of E2 Northeast Motorsports, Inc. (NASCAR) and Coutrá Music Group, Inc. to release the free soundtrack Spotify playlist for the show on March 2. Additionally, E2 Northeast Motorsports, Inc. unveiled the 5th Ward- UMC NASCAR vehicle as part of the Camping World Truck Series in Las Vegas on March 2 as well. Charlie Mac created the theme song and took on the role as music supervisor. Additional music was contributed by Mac A Million Dollar Man Musick, Mýa, Just Brittany, Christopher Jefferson, Chris O' Neal, Corr Kendricks, Cierra Denise Carter, Mista Roe, J. Marie, Jamie Sparks, and more. Scott Szabo is the composer for the series and contributed to the soundtrack as well.

=== Track listing ===
No.	Title	Performer(s)	Length
1.	"Before I Fall"	Christopher Jefferson and Chris O'Neal	3:17
2.	"See You Smile"	Royal	4:40
3.	"Jealous"	Just Brittany	3:19
4.	"Electric Feeling"	Just Invisible	2:59
5.	"I Be Rollin'"	Corr Kendrick and Big Ooh	3:01
6.	"Another Level"	Conceptz	3:00
7.	"Daddy"	Mýa	2:00
8.	"Bees and Birds"	Mista Roe	4:39
9.	"Personal"	Cierra Denise	3:45
10.	"All That"	Jamie Sparks	3:46
11.	"Don't Think That"	Deloach	4:01
12.	"His Eye Is on the Sparrow"	Mýa	2:35
13.	"Falling Into You"	Just Invisible	4:21
14.	"Make It Clap Dirty"	Earkandi	3:26
15.	"Street Life"	Charlie Mac	1:24
16.	"All Talk"	Deloach	3:58
17.	"You Ain't My Friend"	Royal	5:21
18.	"Used to Love You"	Cierra Denise	3:35
19.	"Slow Down"	Earkandi	3:53
20.	"Higher"	Desiree McKinney	4:12
21.	"A Letter to You"	J.Marie	3:43
22.	"Tonight"	Coutrá Music Group	3:38
23.	"Twist in My Hips"	Troublesum	3:49
24.	"Don't Ask"	Ryan Star and Coutrá Music Group	3:13
25.	"Tension"	Mista Roe	3:16
26.	"Break Bread"	Lex Lavo and Coutrá Music Group	3:14
27.	"Runnin' and Gunnin'"	Cap Slaps	3:08
28.	"Blak Amerikkka"	Young Pari$	3:18
29.	"Stay"	Ryan Star and Coutrá Music Group	3:45
30.	"Getting High"	Jamie Sparks	4:33
31.	"Blue & Mina's Theme"	Scott Szabo	2:12
32.	"Ray Ray and Jazmine's Theme"	Scott Szabo	1:56
33.	"Councilman Davis"	Scott Szabo	2:11
34.	"Blue"	Maureen Munroe	3:32
35.	"All I Know"	Filero and Milton Bradley	5:08

=== Release history ===
List of release dates, showing region, formats, label, editions and reference
Region	Date	Format(s)	Label	Edition(s)	Ref.
Various	March 2, 2018	streaming	Nexus Entertainment; Coutrá Music Group	Standard	
