= I Like the Way =

I Like the Way may refer to:

- I Like the Way (EP), 2024 extended play by Kim Woojin
- "I Like the Way" (BodyRockers song), 2005
- "I Like the Way" (Deni Hines song), 1996
- "I Like the Way (The Kissing Game)", a 1991 song by Hi-Five
- "I Like the Way", by Viper from You'll Cowards Don't Even Smoke Crack, 2008

== See also ==
- "(I Like) The Way You Love Me", a 2011 song by Michael Jackson
