= Christian Keyes =

American actor and model

- Born: July 24, 1975 (age 51); Detroit, Michigan, U.S.
- Occupations: Actor; model; singer; author; producer
- Years active: 2005–present

Christian Keyes (born July 24, 1975) is an American actor and model. Born in Detroit, Michigan, and raised in Flint, Michigan, Keyes got his start in the entertainment industry by appearing in stage plays. He subsequently graduated to television and film. Since his introduction as an actor, he has added singer, author and producer to his resume. Keyes has one son, named Christian Keyes, Jr.

== Early life ==
Keyes was born in Detroit and raised in Flint.

== Career ==
Keyes began his career appearing on stage productions and also worked as a model and fitness trainer. On television, he has had guest starring roles on Brothers & Sisters, Moonlight, Family Time, Beauty and the Beast, Instant Mom, Mistresses and Born Again Virgin. From 2011 to 2014, Keyes had a recurring role in the BET comedy series Let's Stay Together. Keyes made an appearance on the CW hit show “Supernatural”, playing the character Michael the Archangel. In 2019, Keyes starred as Desmond (Nerón), the leading villain on the CW show, DC’s Legends of Tomorrow. He also appeared in Keri Hilson's music video "Energy", "The Way That I Love You" by Ashanti, "In the Morning" by Ledisi, and "Suitcase" by Mary J. Blige playing love interests.

Keyes has appeared in several films and made-for-television movies, include leading roles in Perfect Combination (2010), Lord, All Men Can't Be Dogs (2011) alongside Vivica A. Fox, Note to Self (2012), Act Like You Love Me (2013) and The Man in 3B (2015). He also appear in Tyler Perry's stage plays including Madea Goes to Jail and What's Done in the Dark. Keyes became a member of the Zeta Beta chapter of Alpha Phi Alpha fraternity while attending Ferris State University.

In 2016, Keyes was cast as male lead alongside Vanessa Bell Calloway, Gloria Reuben, Jasmine Burke and Clifton Powell in the Bounce TV prime time soap opera, Saints & Sinners. In 2018, Keyes starred on BET drama series In Contempt as Charlie Riggs. In January 2020, it was announced that he had been cast in the role of Ripley Turner on The Young and the Restless.

Keyes has authored 2 fictional urban romance novels in the mid 2010s which were presented by American author Carl Weber. His novel Ladies Night was released in 2015 and was later adapted into a 2021 BET+ television drama crime series All The Queen's Men, written and produced by Keyes and Tyler Perry Studios. Keyes also stars in the series. Keyes later authored Dr. Feel Good released in 2016.

== Filmography ==
=== Film ===
Year	Title	Role	Notes
2005	Diary of a Mad Black Woman	Man Proposing	
2006	Madea Goes to Jail	Sonny	Video
2007	Game Day	Officer Lennox	Video
2008	What's Done in the Dark	Doctor Harris	Video
2009	Truly Blessed	Sgt. Greydie	
2010	Perfect Combination	Rick	
2010	Love Me or Leave Me	Justin Daniels	TV movie
2011	Lord, All Men Can't Be Dogs	Tim	
2011	She's Not Our Sister	D'Andre	TV movie
2011	The Perfect Man	Russell	
2011	The Bachelor Party	Reny	Video
2011	He's Mine Not Yours	Jason	
2011	Cheaper to Keep Her	Eddie	Video
2012	Dysfunctional Friends	Stylz	
2012	The Good Life	Drew	
2012	Note to Self	Curtis King	
2012	What She Wants for Christmas	Fake Santa/Sebastien	
2013	Winnerz	Duck	
2013	The Prayer Circle	Wood	
2013	Act Like You Love Me	Chad	
2013	What Would You Do for Love	Reggie	TV movie
2014	Black Coffee	Julian	
2014	Four Seasons	Derrick	
2014	Lap Dance	Mayor	
2014	Love Will Find A Way	Reggie	Sequel
2015	The Man in 3B	Slim	
2016	The Christmas Swap	Ellis Craig	TV movie
2017	Love by the 10th Date	Kevin	TV movie
2017	The Preacher's Son	Dante Wilson	
2017	The Lost Souls Cafe	Taylor	TV movie
2017	We Are Family	Bradley	
2018	The Choir Director	Dante Wilson	
2018	No More Mr Nice Guy	Niles Monroe	
2021	Never and Again	Robert Washington	
2021	Saints & Sinners Judgment Day	Levi Sterling	TV movie
2022	Stalker	Damon	TV movie

=== Television ===
Year	Title	Role	Notes
2007	Brothers & Sisters	Bouncer	Episode: "Sexual Politics"
2008	Moonlight	Dominic Michaels	Episode: "Sonata"
2008	Zane's Sex Chronicles	Anthony	Episode: "Dirty Laundry"
2011	Love That Girl!	Bobby	Episode: "Remember the Time"
2011	She's Still Not Our Sister	D'Andre	Main Cast
2011–14	Let's Stay Together	Troy	Guest: Season 1, Recurring Cast: Season 2–4
2012	Family Time	Lorenzo	Episode: "When a Woman's Fed Up"
2013	Beauty & the Beast	Darius Bishop	Episode: "Trust No One" & "Tough Love"
2014	Instant Mom	Vince	Episode: "Should Old Acquaintance Be for Hire"
2014	Mistresses	Casey	Episode: "Rebuild" & "Open House"
2015	Every Witch Way	Michael	Episode: "Apocalypse World"
2015	Born Again Virgin	Pastor	Episode: "We Build Monsters"
2016–22	Saints & Sinners	Levi Sterling	Main Cast: Season 1–2, Recurring Cast: Season 3 & 5–6
2017–18	Supernatural	Michael	Recurring Cast: Season 13
2018	In Contempt	Charles Theodore "Charlie" Riggs	Main Cast
2018–19	Legends of Tomorrow	Desmond/Neron	Recurring Cast: Season 4
2018–24	The Family Business	Niles Monroe	Recurring Cast: Seasons 1–2 & 5
2019–20	9-1-1	Doctor Calloway	Recurring Cast: Season 3
2019–26	The Boys	Nathan Franklin	Recurring Cast: Season 1 & 3, Guest: Season 4–5
2020	The Young and the Restless	Ripley Turner	Regular Cast
2021	The Rookie	Alonzo Smith	Recurring Cast: Season 3
2021–25	All the Queen's Men	Raphael "The Concierge" Damascus	Recurring Cast: Season 1, Main Cast: Season 2
2022	Reasonable Doubt	Ryan Moore	Recurring Cast
2022–23	All Rise	Robin	Recurring Cast: Season 3

== Discography ==
List of albums
Title	Album details
Day By Day	• Released: September 25, 2005
Get Involved	• Released: November 13, 2023
