= Seven Deadly Sins (film series) =

American television film series

Seven Deadly Sins Anthology is an American television drama film series based on the books by Victoria Christopher Murray and produced by T.D. Jakes, Derrick Williams and Shaun Robinson for Lifetime and LMN.

Each film in the series follows a story inspired by one of the seven deadly sins according to the Catholic Church. The first two films Lust: A Seven Deadly Sins Story (starring singer Keri Hilson) and Envy: A Seven Deadly Sins Story (starring actress Rose Rollins) premiered on April 10 and April 18, 2021 respectively. The third and fourth films Wrath: A Seven Deadly Sins Story (starring singer Michelle Williams) and Greed: A Seven Deadly Sins Story (starring actress Monique Coleman) premiered on April 16 and April 23, 2022 respectively. The fifth movie in the series, titled Pride: A Seven Deadly Sins Story, starred singer Stephanie Mills and premiered on April 8, 2023.

== Films ==
No.	Title	Directed by	Written by	Original release date
1	Lust: A Seven Deadly Sins Story	Star Victoria	Sonay Hoffman	April 10, 2021
Starring: Keri Hilson, Tobias Truvillion, Tank, Letoya Luckett, Clifton Powell and Hosea Chanchez
2	Envy: A Seven Deadly Sins Story	Damon Lee	Nneka Gerstle	April 18, 2021
Starring: Rose Rollins, Serayah, Kandi Burruss, Donovan Christie Jr., Gregory Alan Williams, Da Brat, DC Young Fly, Clifton Powell and Hosea Chanchez
3	Wrath: A Seven Deadly Sins Story	Troy Scott	Richard Blaney, Maryam Myika Day and Gregory Small	April 16, 2022
Starring: Michelle Williams, Antonio Cupo, Tina Knowles and Romeo Miller
4	Greed: A Seven Deadly Sins Story	Troy Scott	Adrienne Carter, Wuese Houston-Jibo and Monique N. Matthews	April 23, 2022
Starring: Monique Coleman, Nathan Witte, Eric Benét and LisaRaye McCoy
5	Pride: A Seven Deadly Sins Story	Troy Scott	Adrienne Carter, Wuese Houston-Jibo and Monique N. Matthews	April 8, 2023
Starring: Stephanie Mills, Thomas Miles, Keeya King and Erica Atkins
TBA	Sloth: A Seven Deadly Sins Story	TBA	TBA	TBA
Starring:
TBA	Gluttony: A Seven Deadly Sins Story	TBA	TBA	TBA
Starring:
