= Nephew Tommy's Prank Phone Calls: Volume 2 =

Studio album by Nephew Tommy
- Released: December 8, 2012
- Recorded: 2012
- Genre: Comedy
- Label: TNT Entertainment
- Producer: Nephew Tommy

Nephew Tommy chronology
Nephew Tommy's Prank Phone Calls: Volume 1	Nephew Tommy's Prank Phone Calls: Volume 2 (2012)	The Best of Nephew Tommy's Prank Phone Calls: Volume 3 (2012)

Nephew Tommy's Prank Phone Calls: Volume 2 is the second album by comedian Nephew Tommy.

== Track listing ==
1. Intro - 2:23
2. Snitchen - 6:10
3. Sneaking People Across the Border - 7:40
4. Unbeweavable - 5:57
5. Don't Mess Up My Moma's House - 7;42
6. You Can't Use the "N" Word - 6:00
7. Mister Wiggins - 5:50
8. You Can't Date Black Woman - 6:36
9. Your Wife Is My Brother Tim - 6:41
10. Child Support 101 - 8:05
11. The White Man That Lost It - 7:08
12. Guy Torry - 6:42
13. Outro - 0:57
