= Sanctioning Evil =

Action film by Ante Novakovic

- Directed by: Ante Novakovic
- Written by: Kyle Travis Sharp
- Produced by: Harry Azano; Taheim Bryan; Ante Novakovic; Rob Simmons
- Starring: Tobias Truvillion; Zach McGowan; Taryn Manning
- Cinematography: John Schmidt
- Edited by: Pete Talamo
- Music by: Nima Fakhrara
- Production companies: JARS Productions; Novakovic Bros.
- Distributed by: Vertical Entertainment
- Release date: October 7, 2022
- Running time: 110 minutes
- Country: United States
- Language: English

Sanctioning Evil is a 2022 American action-thriller film written by Kyle Travis Sharp and directed by Ante Novakovic. The film stars Tobias Truvillion, Zach McGowan and Taryn Manning. The film follows Staff sergeant Reginald Barnes (Truvillion), a recently discharged Army veteran who finds his way back into society via congressman Ambrose (McGowan). The film was shot in New York and New Jersey in late 2020.

The film was released on October 7, 2022, by Vertical Entertainment.

== Cast ==
- Tobias Truvillion as Staff sergeant Reginald Barnes
- Zach McGowan as Dakota Ambrose
- Taryn Manning as FBI Special Agent Kensington
- Chris Tardio as Jeff
- Tasha Lawrence as Virginia
- Carrie Kim as Sarah
- Kyle Travis Sharp as Seth
- Kresh Novakovic as Reynolds
- Ebony Jo-Ann as Risa
- James Biberi as Francis
- Betsy Beutler as Ann
- Byron Clohessy as Mendel
- Peter Patrikios as Martin
- Sal Rendino as Dr. Peter Corey

== Reception ==
Film critic Jim Morazzini from Voices from the Balcony gave in 1 of 5 stars writing: "Talky and dull with a plot that relies on coincidence Sanctioning Evil is an overlong mess that could have been a solid revenge-based action film. Or an interesting conspiracy film. Or a thriller about political corruption. Instead, it incorporates bits of all three and comes out with a mess complete with a sanctimonious quote from the Bible to justify it all.”

Nelson Acosta from Fiction Horizon gave it 8/10 and praised the performances writing: "when the film gets going, it ends up becoming this fascinating exploration of morals in a world that doesn’t want anything to do with them. The film also goes for an ending that feels the complete opposite of what other films are doing. Some might find it anticlimactic, but Sanctioning Evil goes for it and makes the film worth watching."
