= Tobias Truvillion =

American actor (born 1975)

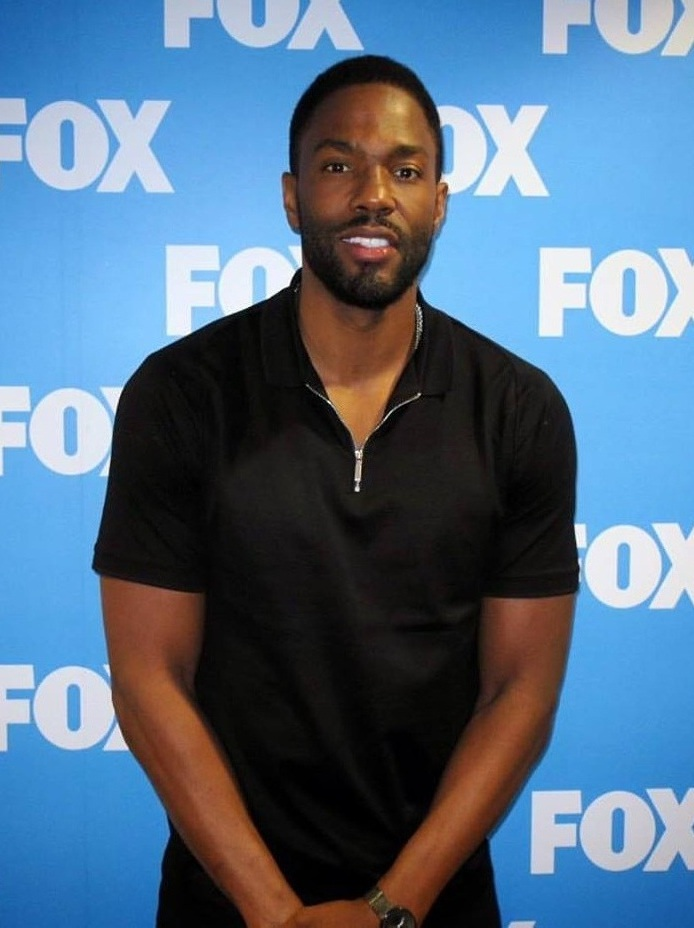
- Truvillion in 2017
- Born: October 1, 1975 (age 50); Queens, New York, U.S.
- Occupation: Actor
- Years active: 1999–present
- Spouse: Michele Morgan (m. 2012)

Tobias Truvillion (born October 1, 1975) is an American actor and model. He made his professional acting debut starring in the 2001 off-Broadway musical Oya receiving AUDELCO Award for Outstanding Performance in a Musical. From 2006 to 2008, Truvillion was regular cast member in the ABC daytime soap opera, One Life to Live and later had recurring roles on prime time series such as Empire and First Wives Club. He appeared in films Brooklyn's Finest (2009), Equal Standard (2020), Sanctioning Evil (2022) and First Lady of BMF: The Tonesa Welch Story (2023).

== Life and career ==
Truvillion was born in Queens, New York and grew up in Flushing and graduated from Bayside High School. He began his career as a runway and print model for Ford Models, and while modeling, Truvillion studied acting. In 2001 he made his professional acting debut in the off-Broadway musical Oya receiving AUDELCO Award for Outstanding Performance in a Musical. He played minor roles in films Paid in Full (2002), Death of a Dynasty (2003) and Hitch (2005), and guest-starred on television series Third Watch and Law & Order: Special Victims Unit. In 2006, he received his first major role on the ABC daytime soap opera, One Life to Live, playing Vincent Jones. He left the soap in 2008. Since leaving soap, Truvillion began appearing in film and prime time television playing guest starring roles on Law & Order: Criminal Intent, Blue Bloods, White Collar and Person of Interest. In 2010 he returned to off-Broadway starring in Black Angels Over Tuskegee by Layon Gray.

In 2015, Truvillion had recurring role in the Starz miniseries, Flesh and Bone and from 2016 to 2017 had a recurring role as Derek "D-Major" Major in the Fox musical series, Empire. In 2018 he starred in the short-lived BET legal drama series, In Contempt. The following year he played his first leading role in the made-for-television movie Holiday Heist.

From 2019 to 2022, Truvillion had recurring role in the BET+ comedy-drama series, First Wives Club. In 2020 he played another leading role in the crime drama film Equal Standard, and had recurring role during the first season of BET comedy-drama Sistas. In 2021 he starred alongside Keri Hilson in the Lifetime movie Lust: A Seven Deadly Sins Story and later guest-starred on New Amsterdam, Queens, The Resident, FBI and The Best Man: The Final Chapters. In 2022, Truvillion played the lead in the action thriller film, Sanctioning Evil. In 2023 he starred in the drama film Aurora: A Love Story, the action thriller Call Her King, the crime thriller Sisters, and the biographical crime drama First Lady of BMF: The Tonesa Welch Story directed by Vivica A. Fox. He starred opposite Jessica Care Moore in the drama film He Looked like a Postcard directed by Qasim Basir.

== Personal life ==
In 2012, Truvillion married actress Michele Morgan, they reside in New Jersey.

== Filmography ==
=== Film ===
Year	Title	Role	Notes
2002	Paid in Full	Runner	
2003	Death of a Dynasty	Cool Guy	
2003	Harlem's Beauty	Yummy	
2005	Hitch	Kurt	
2006	Delirious	Silky	
2007	Blackout	Reggie	
2008	The Day the Bread Turned Green	Black Baker	Short
2009	Brooklyn's Finest	Gutta	
2010	The Tested	James	
2010	Persons of Interest	Trig (2014)	
2011	Three Prayers for June	Gary	Short
2011	Heartfelt	Neef Vick	Short
2012	Zoo	Yancy	
2012	Nous York	Shoe Seller	
2014	Seasons of Love	Meechi	TV movie
2014	Attempted Burglary - a Film Noir Short	The Soldier	Short
2015	Supermodel	Det. Jacobs	
2015	The Trade	Tyson	Short
2016	Lack of Will	DeMarcus	Short
2017	Dope Fiend	Big G	
2017	Secrets	Stephen	
2017	Bobbi Kristina	Butter	
2017	Cigarette Soup	Julian 'Monti' Montgomery	
2018	The Products of the American Ghetto	Brian	
2018	The Stuff	Brandon	
2018	King of Newark 2	Miasha Boyfriend	
2019	Love Dot Com: The Social Experiment	Greg Jeffries	
2019	Loved To Death	Dre	
2019	Seberg	Dewayne	
2019	Holiday Heist	Devin	
2020	Equal Standard	Detective Chris Jones	
2021	Seven Deadly Sins: Lust	Damon King	TV movie
2021	Sand Dollar Cove	Alden Conway	TV movie
2021	I Am a Man	-	Short
2021	A Holiday Chance	Keith Austin	TV movie
2022	Respect the Jux	Detective Johnson	
2022	To Her, With Love	Jordan	TV movie
2022	Sanctioning Evil	Barnes	
2023	Aurora	Kenny	
2023	The Fearless Three	Master OSHA	
2023	Call Her King	Gerald King	
2023	Sisters	Reggie	
2023	First Lady of BMF: The Tonesa Welch Story	Harvey	

=== Television ===
Year	Title	Role	Notes
2003	Playmakers	Luther Hawkins	Episode: "Down & Distance"
2004	Third Watch	Skeeter	Episode: "Rat Bastard"
2005	Law & Order: Special Victims Unit	Military Police Officer	Episode: "Goliath"
2006–08	One Life to Live	Vincent Jones	Regular Cast
2009	BN4 Real	Craig Lewis	Episode: "Plate Full of Lies"
2009	Law & Order: Criminal Intent	Deshawn Warner	Episode: "All In"
2011–12	Blue Bloods	Otto	Guest Cast: Season 2-3
2012	Truth Unspoken Series	Chad Perry	Episode: "Love Is Color Blind" & "Is That You?"
2013	White Collar	Robert Bly	Episode: "Quantico Closure"
2014	Person of Interest	Trig	Episode: "Brotherhood"
2015	The Blacklist	Officer	Episode: "Quon Zhang (No. 87)"
2015	Flesh and Bone	Beau	Recurring Cast
2016–17	Empire	Derek "D-Major" Major	Recurring Cast: Season 2-3
2018	In Contempt	Bennett Thompson	Main Cast
2018	Chicago P.D.	Kenny Armstrong	Episode: "Black and Blue"
2019–22	The First Wives Club	Khalil	Recurring Cast: Season 1 & 3
2020	Sistas	Morris Hollis	Recurring Cast: Season 1
2021	New Amsterdam	Guillaume	Episode: "Laughter and Hope and a Sock in the Eye"
2022	Queens	Frank Black	Episode: "Nasty Girl Records"
2022	The Resident	Pastor Aaron Deering	Episode: "6 Volts"
2022	FBI	Trey Cooper	Episode: "Kayla"
2022	Tales	Ezekiel	Episode: "Put It on Me"
2022	The Best Man: The Final Chapters	Jaha	Episode: "The Invisible Man" & "The Party"
2023	East New York	Jamal Hayes	Episode: "Up in Smoke"
2023	The Equalizer	Marlon Dean	Episode: "Justified"
2025	Law & Order	Shane Willis	Episode: "Brotherly Love"

=== Music videos ===
Year	Title	Artist	Role
2005	"Free Yourself"	Fantasia Barrino	Love interest
2010	"I'm Doin' Me"	Fantasia Barrino	Love interest
2017	"Real One"	Chanté Moore	Love interest

== Awards and nominations ==
Year	Awards	Category	Nominated work	Result
2001	AUDELCO Awards	Outstanding Performance in a Musical (Male)	Oya	Won
2008	NAACP Image Awards	Outstanding Actor in a Daytime Drama Series	One Life to Live	Nominated
