= The Three Muscatels =

- Theatrical release poster
- Directed by: Romell Foster-Owens
- Written by: Flynn Belaine Pryor; Cal Wilson
- Based on: The Three Musketeers by Alexandre Dumas
- Produced by: Betty Spruill
- Starring: Richard Pryor; Flynn Belaine; Cal Wilson; Reynaldo Rey; Joe Torry; Roy Fegan; Ron Goss
- Cinematography: John L. Demps Jr.
- Edited by: John David Allen
- Music by: Vincent L. Bryant
- Distributed by: Paramount Pictures
- Release date: November 8, 1991
- Running time: 97 minutes
- Language: English

The Three Muscatels is a 1991 American parody comedy-drama film directed by Romell Foster-Owens. The film stars Richard Pryor and his then wife Flynn Belaine, who also wrote the script with Cal Wilson. The film is based on the 1844 novel The Three Musketeers by Alexandre Dumas. This was Richard Pryor's last theatrically released film for which he received star billing in a dramatic role. It premiered at the African-American Film Marketplace in November 1991.

== Plot ==
Donna Bon Viant is a college student, who has to complete an assignment on the 14th century for her African-American literature class. She chooses to base her writings on The Three Musketeers, a famous novel by Alexandre Dumas. Donna begins to read the novel and falls asleep in the process. She dreams a zany dream involving the adventures of "The Three Muscatels". The adventures include a number of people in Donna's life including students in her class, members of her family, and an alcoholic she met earlier in the day named Russell, who was drinking muscatel wine.

== Cast ==
- Richard Pryor as Wino / Bartender
- Flynn Belaine as Donna Bon Viant / Dorian
- Cal Wilson as Victor Langford
- Reynaldo Rey as King Alberto Nacho
- Joe Torry as Andre Squire
- Roy Fegan as Puablo the Traitor
- Ron Goss as Squeeky Lopsider

== Production ==
It was filmed in Atlanta, Georgia in 56 days, from January 19 to March 16, 1991.

== See also ==
- Richard Pryor filmography
