= Roy Fegan =

American actor

- Born: January 27, 1961 (age 65); Los Angeles, California, U.S.
- Occupation: Actor
- Years active: 1982–present
- Children: Roshon Fegan

Roy Fegan (born January 27, 1961) is an American actor, producer and director. He is best known for his role as Simon Caine in the 1993 film The Meteor Man. He is also the CEO and founder of Black Owned TV.

== Career ==
Fegan is the writer and producer of the musical Treat Her Like a Lady.

He has worked with Robert Townsend on several projects, including: Hollywood Shuffle (1987), I'm Gonna Git You Sucka (1988), The Five Heartbeats (1991), The Meteor Man (1993) and HBO's Partners in Crime series.

== Personal life ==
He is the father of actor, producer, songwriter Roshon Fegan.

== Filmography ==
=== Film ===
Year	Title	Role	Notes
1982	They Call Me Bruce?	Hood	
1987	Hollywood Shuffle	Jesse Wilson / Slave #2 / Zombie	
1988	Police Story: The Watch Commander	Young Man #1	TV movie
1988	I'm Gonna Git You Sucka	Dead Pimp	
1990	Syngenor	Donnie	
1991	What Ever Happened to...	Police Officer	TV movie
1991	The Five Heartbeats	Bird	
1991	Mothers and Daughters	Pete	Short
1991	Fragrance	Keith Trenton	Short
1991	The Three Muscatels	Puablo the Traitor	
1993	The Meteor Man	Simon - Golden Lord Chief	
1994	House Party 3	Mc Can't C	
1995	The Barefoot Executive	Warm-Up Comic	TV movie
1996	The Cherokee Kid	Seth	TV movie
2000	Midnight Blue	Jim Beamer	TV movie
2001	Thug Life	Damon	
2012	House Arrest	Detective Johnson	

=== Television ===
Year	Title	Role	Notes
1985	Hunter	Paramedic	Episode: "Night of the Dragons"
1985	Misfits of Science	M.P.	Episode: "Guess What's Coming to Dinner"
1986	Alfred Hitchcock Presents	Person #1	Episode: "The Jar"
1987	227	Cop	Episode: "And Baby Makes Three"
1988	Matlock	Lt. Snell	Episode: "The Gigolo"
1988	Mr. Belvedere	Mover #1	Episode: "Heather's Monk"
1989	Living Dolls	Assistant	Episode: "Seeing Is Believing"
1991	Sisters	Tony Jennings	Episode: "Deja Vu All Over Again"
1993	Married... with Children	Team Official	Episode: "A Tisket, a Tasket, Can Peg Make a Basket?"
1993	Daddy Dearest	Business Man	Episode: "Al vs. DMV"
1995	Hangin' with Mr. Cooper	Eddie	Episode: "Together Again"
1995	Cleghorne!	FedEx Guy	Episode: "Adventures in Babysitting"
1996	Murphy Brown	Security Guard	Episode: "Up in Smoke"
1996	Martin	James Earl Jackson	Episode: "Homeo and Juliet"
1996	Touched by an Angel	Jimmy	Episode: "The Homecoming: Part 1"
1997	Mad About You	Klarik's Manager	Episode: "Astrology"
1997	The Jamie Foxx Show	Kwame Cooper	Episode: "The Young and the Meatless"
1998	Will & Grace	IRS Auditor	Episode: "Where There's a Will, There's No Way"
2003	Miracles	Hanger Guard	Episode: "The Friendly Skies"
2003	The Shield	William	Episode: "Breakpoint"
2016	Scream Queens	Slade Hornborn	Episode: "The Hand"
2017	In the Cut	Charles	Episode: "Blast from the Past"
2019–21	Monogamy	Uncle Harvey	Recurring Cast: Season 2-3

=== Video game ===
Year	Title	Role
2014	Titanfall	Additional Voices (voice)
