= Nephew Tommy's Prank Phone Calls: Volume 1 =

Studio album by Nephew Tommy
- Released: December 7, 2012
- Recorded: 2012
- Genre: Comedy
- Label: TNT Entertainment
- Producer: Nephew Tommy

Nephew Tommy chronology
Nephew Tommy's Prank Phone Calls: Volume 1 (2012)	Nephew Tommy's Prank Phone Calls: Volume 2 (2012)

Nephew Tommy's Prank Phone Calls: Volume 1 is the debut album by comedian Nephew Tommy. It features some of his most famous prank phone calls requested by fans.

== Track listing ==
1. Intro - 1:58
2. N-Word With Lester Tucker - 4:25
3. Cemetery - 5:53
4. The Caterer - 4:33
5. Chubb Rock - 6:56
6. Curry Goat Birthday - 6:16
7. Please Don't Come to Church No More - 5:52
8. Rickey Smiley "The King of Prank Phone Calls" - 6h
9. Raymond "Trapped in the Closet" - 7:01
10. Porter Potty - 4:36
11. You Hit My Car in the Parking Lot - 6:04
12. Bonus Prank: K-Miller - 5:42
13. Benediction - 0:50
