= Resurrection: The J.R. Richard Story =

- Resurrection: The J.R. Richard Story movie poster
- Directed by: Greg Carter
- Written by: Keith Kjornes
- Produced by: Benjamin O. Jimerson-Phillips; Greg Carter; Larry Johnson; J.R. Richard; Executive Producers: Charlie Bellinger-Bethea; Larry Johnson; Quanell X
- Starring: David Ramsey; Charles Durning; Kenya Moore; Sara Stokes; Ron Finberg; Anika McFall; Annette P. Jimerson; Jessica M. Jimerson
- Production company: Bellinger-Bethea X Films
- Release date: February 11, 2005
- Running time: 120 min
- Country: United States
- Language: English

Resurrection: The J.R. Richard Story is a 2005 American independent film, directed by Greg Carter and Benjamin O. Jimerson-Phillips, Executive Producers Charlie Bellinger, J.R. Richard & Larry Johnson; and Produced by Benjamin O. Jimerson-Phillips, and Bruce Dalton, starring David Ramsey and Charles Durning two time Academy Award Nominee. The film is a biopic tale of the Houston Astros baseball Pitcher J. R. Richard, his life high points and struggles. It was shot by Bellinger-7 Films, which is owned by Ms. Charlie Bellinger-Bethea, former wife of Pro Football Hall of Fame inductee Elvin Bethea, and done in association with Nexus Films & Adept Films Inc.

== Premise ==
The story of famed Houston Astros baseball Pitcher J.R. Richard, from his early life in Louisiana, to his beginnings as a major baseball player in 1969, leading up to the massive stroke he suffered in 1980, leaving his only true Resurrection to his close friends and fans back into baseball.

== Cast ==
- David Ramsey as J.R. Richard
- Charles Durning as Frank McNally
- Kenya Moore as Leticia
- Sara Stokes as Pamela
- Ron Finberg as Wally Cruise
- Annette P. Jimerson as Secretary
- Jessica M. Jimerson as Jessy
