= Persia White =

American actress-singer (born 1976)

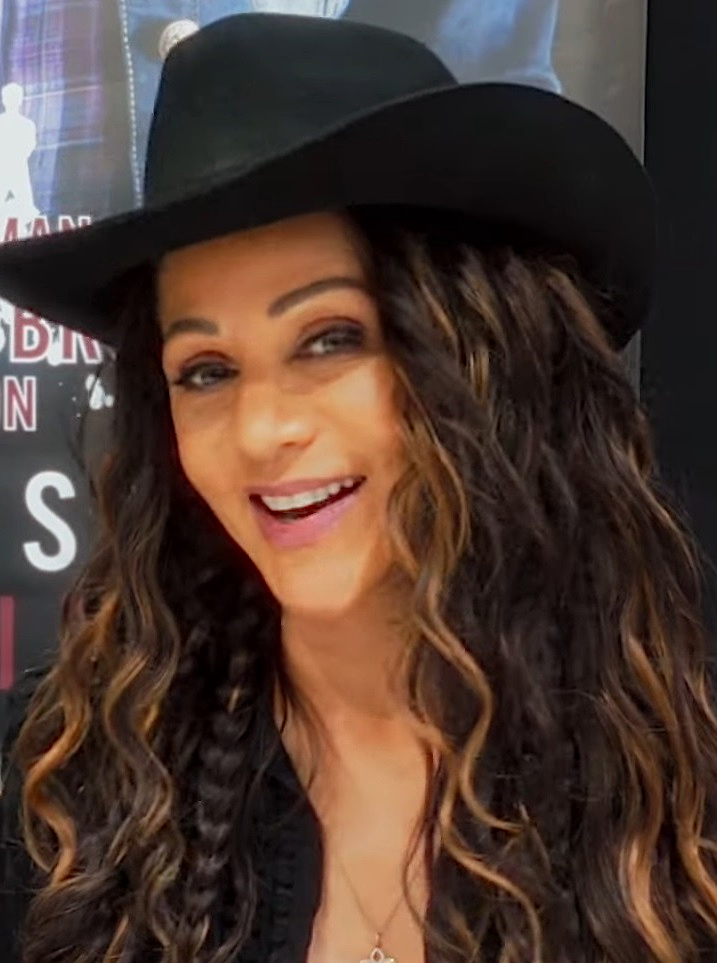
- White in 2024
- Born: October 25, 1976 (age 50); Philadelphia, Pennsylvania, U.S.
- Occupations: Actress, singer
- Years active: 1988–present
- Known for: Lynn Searcy in Girlfriends
- Spouses: Saul Williams (m. 2008; div. 2009); Joseph Morgan (m. 2014)
- Children: 1
- Website: persia-white.com

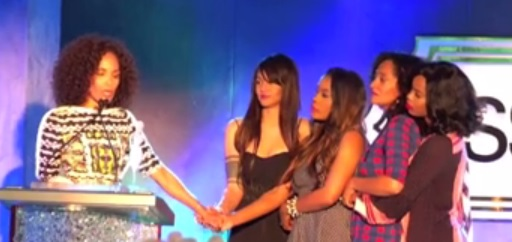
Left to right: Mara Brock Akil with White, Golden Brooks, Tracee Ellis Ross, and Jill Marie Jones in 2013

Persia White (born October 25, 1976) is an American actress and singer known for her role as Lynn Searcy on the UPN/CW sitcom Girlfriends and as Abby Bennett Wilson in The Vampire Diaries (2012–2017). White is also a singer, and released a solo album, Mecca, in 2009.

== Early life ==
White was born on October 25, 1976, in Philadelphia, Pennsylvania. Her early years were spent in The Bahamas. White's father was paralyzed in a car accident when she was three, and he later moved to Miami to seek better medical care. White's mother moved with her children to South Florida two years later but did not reunite with White's father. White later joined the Miami Coconut Grove Children's Theater. As a teen, she studied dance, acting, singing, and painting. After high school, White signed with the Ford Agency and obtained her Screen Actors Guild card. She then moved to Los Angeles to pursue a career in acting.

== Career ==
White has appeared in various independent films, including Red Letters (opposite Peter Coyote) and the cult horror Blood Dolls. She starred in the made-for-TV movies Operation Sandman, opposite Ron Perlman, and Suddenly, opposite Kirstie Alley. Her television work includes appearances on Angel, NYPD Blue, The Steve Harvey Show, Brooklyn South, Buffy the Vampire Slayer, as well as regular roles on Breaker High with co-star Ryan Gosling, Sister, Sister as Anya and Girlfriends as Lynn. In 2008, White appeared in The Fall of Night in the role of Dawn. She can also be seen in Chrisette Michele's video for "Be OK".

In addition to acting, White also co-produced the award-winning documentary Earthlings, narrated by Joaquin Phoenix. In July 2011, White won the award for Best Performance by an Actor in the American Black Film Festival for her work in Dysfunctional Friends. She also appeared as Bonnie's mother on The Vampire Diaries in a semi-recurring role.

In 2019, she reunited with her Girlfriends co-stars Tracee Ellis Ross, Jill Marie Jones, and Golden Brooks in an episode of the ABC comedy series Black-ish.

== Personal life ==
White is a vegan, a human and animal rights advocate, and environmentalist. She was honored by PETA as a 2005 Humanitarian of the Year. She is a board member for the Sea Shepherd Conservation Society.

On February 29, 2008, White became engaged to singer Saul Williams, her boyfriend of five years, and married in 2008. They met in 2003 when he made a guest appearance on the TV show Girlfriends. On January 17, 2009, White announced via her Myspace blog that she and Williams were no longer together.

After three years of dating, White married fellow Vampire Diaries actor Joseph Morgan in Ocho Rios, Jamaica on July 5, 2014, after which, he adopted her daughter and they had her legal name changed to Mecca Morgan White.

== Filmography ==
=== Film ===
Year	Title	Role	Notes
1993	Last Action Hero	Herself	
1994	Blue Chips	-	
1996	Suddenly	Trina	TV movie
1999	Blood Dolls	Black Baby	
2000	Operation Sandman	Private Winslow	TV movie
2000	Red Letters	Vanessa Cody	
2000	Stalled	Leanne	
2007	The Fall of Night	Dawn	
2007	Everyday Joe	Gina	Short
2009	Spoken Word	Shea	
2010	Kiss the Bride	Trina	Video
2012	Dysfunctional Friends	Trenyce	
2012	The Marriage Chronicles	Marcia Anson	
2012	Guardian of Eden	Clarke	
2012	Black November	Tracey	
2012	No Mo Games	Morgan	
2012	Mafia	Mel	
2013	Revelation	-	Short
2014	Desiree	Jack	
2016	Wichita	Raven	
2017	Cargo	Berneice	
2017	Candid	-	Short
2017	Miss Me This Christmas	Millicent Williams	
2017	You Can't Fight Christmas	Millicent Williams	
2017	Carousel	Nicole	Short
2018	Juice Truck	Pat	Short

=== Television ===
Year	Title	Role	Notes
1995	The Client	Black Female Student	Episode: "The Burning of Atlanta"
1996	NYPD Blue	Margie	Episode: "These Old Bones"
1996	Malibu Shores	Listener	Episode: "Hotline"
1996	Saved by the Bell: The New Class	Heather	Episode: "Little Hero"
1996	Goode Behavior	Trish	Episode: "Goode Grades"
1997	Weird Science	Kim	Episode: "Gary Had a Little Cram"
1997	The Burning Zone	Jenny	Episode: "Critical Mass"
1997	Sister, Sister	Anya	Episode: "Three the Heart Way"
1997	The Parent 'Hood	Alexia	Episode: "Tango & Cash"
1997	Buffy the Vampire Slayer	Aura	Episode: "Welcome to the Hellmouth"
1997	Beyond Belief: Fact or Fiction	Molly	Episode: "On the Road"
1997–98	Breaker High	Denise Williams	Main Cast
1998	Brooklyn South	Cinnamon	Episode: "Cinnamon Buns"
1998	Malcolm & Eddie	Sharon	Episode: "Bowl-a-Drama"
1999	The Steve Harvey Show	Monique	Episode: "All That Jazz"
1999	Clueless	Veronica	Episode: "My Best Friend's Boyfriend"
1999	Another World	Kineisha 'K.C.' Burrell	Regular Cast
2000–08	Girlfriends	Lynn Searcy	Main Cast
2001	The Test	Herself/Panelist	Episode: "The Liar Test"
2001	Angel	Agnes "Aggie" Belfleur	Episode: "Over the Rainbow"
2004	NAACP Image Awards	Herself/Co-Host	Main Co-Host
2005	Infanity	Herself	Episode: "Girlfriends"
2005	Unscripted	Flirty Girl	Episode: "Episode #1.8"
2008	Battleground Earth	Herself	Episode: "Something's Fishy"
2012–17	The Vampire Diaries	Abby Bennett Wilson	Recurring Cast: Season 3, Guest: Season 4 & 8
2019	Black-ish	Lila	Episode: "Feminisn't"
2020	Will & Grace	Katie Palmer-Payne	Episode: "Of Mouse and Men"

=== Documentary ===
Year	Title	Role
2005	Earthlings	Co-Narrator
2015	Unity	Narrator

== Awards ==
Year	Award	Category	Title of work	Win/Nomination
2008	ALMA Award	Outstanding Female Performance in a Comedy Television Series	Girlfriends	Nomination
2023	Vienna Independent Film Festival	Best Music Video	Vampire	Winner

== Music ==
Mecca

Studio album by Persia White
- Released: October 31, 2009
- Recorded: 2005–2009
- Genres: Alternative; industrial; trip hop
- Length: 36:30
- Label: Hybrid Music

Singles from Mecca
- 1. "Wanting" Released: October 7, 2009

Mecca is Persia White's debut album. It was released digitally on October 31, 2009, and on CD on December 8, 2009. The title comes from the name of White's daughter. The final three songs on the album were all featured in several episodes of Girlfriends.

1. "Wanting" – 3:58
2. "Perfect" – 3:15
3. "Receive" (featuring Saul Williams) – 4:15
4. "Pressed Against Gods Thoughts" – 2:02
5. "Haunt" – 3:02
6. "2 Sea" – 1:23
7. "Danger" (featuring Saul Williams) – 3:25
8. "Salvation" – 4:57
9. "Tease" (featuring Tricky) – 3:22
10. "Choices" (Girlfriends season 6 finale song) – 2:47
11. "Past Mistakes" (featuring Tricky) – 4:10
