= Hosea Chanchez =

American actor

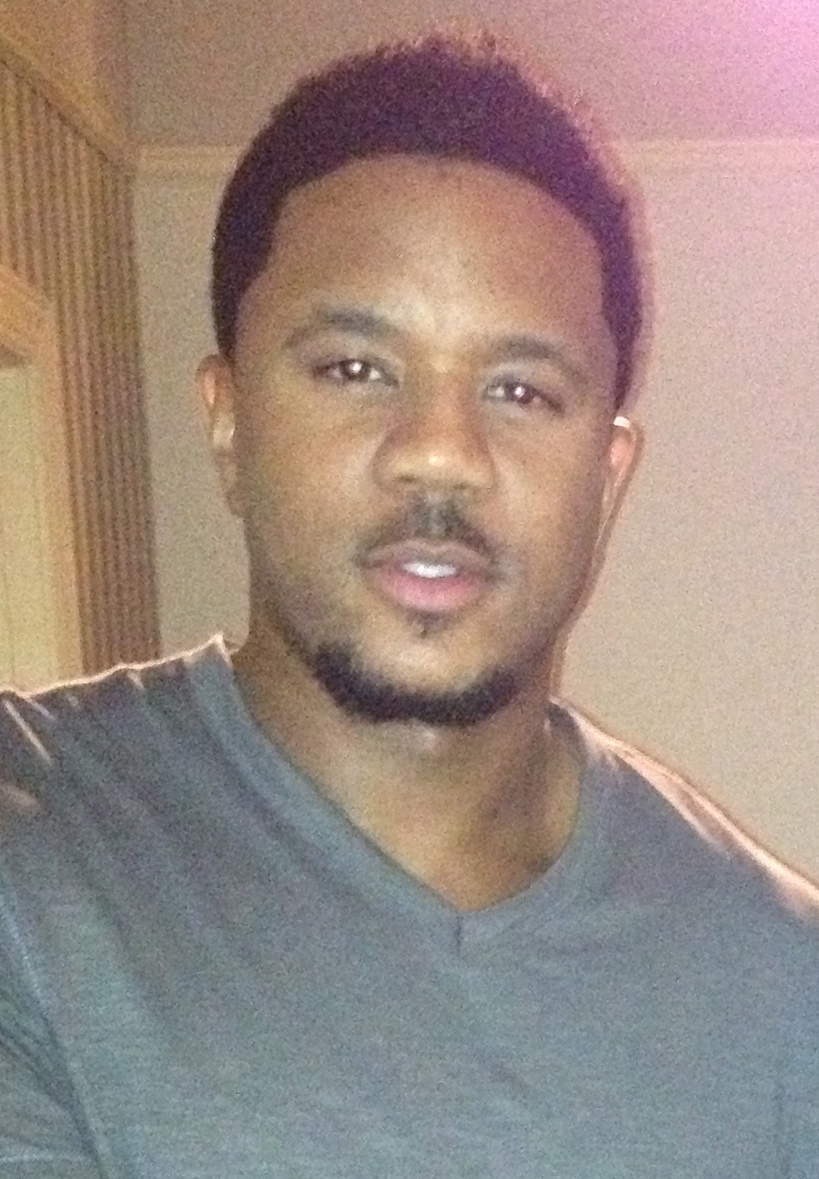
- Chanchez in 2012
- Born: September 12, 1981 (age 45); Montgomery, Alabama, U.S.
- Other name: Hosea
- Occupations: Actor; writer; producer; director
- Years active: 1998–present

Hosea Chanchez (born September 12, 1981), also credited as Hosea, is an American actor best known for his recurring role on For Your Love and the quarterback football player Malik Wright on The CW/BET sitcom, The Game and its 2021 revival.

== Early life ==
Born in Montgomery, Alabama, Chanchez spent most of his childhood in Alabama and Atlanta, Georgia. He attended Sidney Lanier High School in Montgomery, Alabama.

== Career ==
After Chanchez relocated to California, he expressed in an interview with Wendy Williams that he had slept in his car for thirty days before starring in various guest roles on For Your Love, The Guardian, Jack & Bobby, NCIS, and Everwood.

From 2006 to 2015, he appeared on The CW television series The Game. Chanchez portrayed quarterback Malik El Debarge Wright, opposite Wendy Raquel Robinson (who portrayed his mother and agent). The series returned to the air on Black Entertainment Television on January 11, 2011, where the show has become a success. Chanchez also has a theater background, having played roles in Shop Life, The Wiz, The Long Walk Home, Royal Oats and Glory.

In September 2012, Chanchez starred in the BET original film Let the Church Say Amen which was adapted from ReShonda Tate Billingsley's 2005 best-selling novel of the same name. This was the directorial debut of actress Regina King.

== Filmography ==
=== Film ===
Year	Title	Role	Notes
2011	96 Minutes	Officer Grooms	
2012	Dysfunctional Friends	Jamal	
2013	Let the Church Say Amen	David Jackson	TV movie
2018	Down for Whatever	Mike	TV movie
2019	Fanatic	Dom D	TV movie
2021	Lust: A Seven Deadly Sins Story	Justus	TV movie
2021	Envy: A Seven Deadly Sins Story	Justus	TV movie

=== Television ===
Year	Title	Role	Notes
1998–99	For Your Love	Charlie	Recurring Cast: Season 2
2004	The Guardian	Kid	Episode: "Blood In, Blood Out"
2004	Jack & Bobby	Drunk	Episode: "The Kindness of Strangers"
2004	What Should You Do?	Rapist	Recurring Cast: Season 2
2005	NCIS	Lance Cpl. Jaime Ramos	Episode: "Hometown Hero"
2005	Over There	Driver	Episode: "Embedded"
2005	Close to Home	Neighbor #2	Episode: "Pilot"
2005	Everwood	Student	Episode: "So Long, Farewell..."
2006	Girlfriends	Malik Wright	Episode: "The Game"
2006–15	The Game	Malik Wright	Main Cast
2007	The Shield	Angelo Owens	Episode: "The New Guy"
2008	Invincible	Mauler Twins	Recurring Cast
2016	Major Crimes	Emile Fisher	Recurring Cast: Season 4
2019	All American	Damon King	Episode: "All Eyez on Me"
2019	Black Lightning	Marcus Bishop	Recurring Cast: Season 2
2021–23	The Game	Malik Wright	Main Cast
