= Dysfunctional Friends =

2012 film

- Theatrical release poster
- Directed by: Corey Grant
- Written by: Corey Grant
- Produced by: Datari Turner; Gordon Bijelonic; Greg Carter
- Starring: Stacey Dash; Reagan Gomez-Preston; Wesley Jonathan; Datari Turner; Tatyana Ali; Meagan Good; Jason Weaver; Persia White; Terrell Owens; Stacy Keibler; Hosea Chanchez; Christian Keyes; Meghan Markle
- Cinematography: Richard J. Vialet
- Edited by: Ralph Jean-Pierre
- Music by: Keith Robinson; Ira Antelis
- Production company: Datari Turner Productions
- Release date: February 3, 2012
- Running time: 111 minutes
- Country: United States
- Language: English

Dysfunctional Friends is a 2012 American comedy drama film starring Stacey Dash, Reagan Gomez-Preston, Wesley Jonathan, Datari Turner, Tatyana Ali, Meagan Good, Jason Weaver, Persia White, Terrell Owens, Stacy Keibler, Hosea Chanchez, Meghan Markle, and Christian Keyes. The film was released in theaters on February 3, 2012.

== Plot ==
The unexpected death of a friend has reunited former friends at the funeral years after graduating college and going their separate ways. After the funeral they learn from Ms. Stevens that they are all eligible for a big inheritance if they can just spend five days together at his former estate in which she will oversee. The stipulations of their friend's will is if anyone leaves before the five-day period, everyone sacrifices their portion of the estate. What first seems like a lighthearted reunion quickly turns for the worst as old wounds are reopened, and lingering grudges are resurrected. Many of the issues resurrected are created by Ebony's persistent eavesdropping. The unstable engagement between Lisa and Jackson is revealed as Jackson and Storm struggle to keep it a secret that they had a sexual relationship a few years ago when Jackson began to date Lisa. Storm didn't know about the relationship at the time and it increases the tension. Gary has become a porn director much to the disgust of all the women in the estate and is desperate to escape the porn industry. However, he is reluctant to admit it and when he approaches Trenyce with screenplay for a movie whom is a struggling actress she assumes it's to do pornography which increases the tension in the household even more. An attempt to have a peaceful dinner with everyone fails as tempers flare and dark secrets are revealed creating new wounds between them all. A few of the friends begin feeling trapped in a mansion with people who know their darkest secrets grows increasingly unbearable and forces them to reconcile their ways. Some of which truly finding their way realizing one of their greatest mistakes was abandoning their friends.

== Cast ==
- Stacey Dash as Lisa
- Reagan Gomez as Ebony
- Wesley Jonathan as Brett
- Datari Turner as Aron
- Tatyana Ali as Alex
- Meagan Good as Victoria Stevens
- Jason Weaver as Gary
- Persia White as Trenyce
- Terrell Owens as Jackson
- Stacy Keibler as Storm
- Hosea Chanchez as Jamal
- Meghan Markle as Terry
- Christian Keyes as Stylz
