= Lap Dance (film) =

- Directed by: Greg Carter
- Produced by: Datari Turner, Gordon Bijelonic, Cain McKnight, Nenad Medic
- Starring: Ali Cobrin; Carmen Electra; Briana Evigan; Robert Hoffman; LisaRaye; Stacey Dash; Junie Hoang; Nia Peeples; K.D. Aubert; Datari Turner; Lew Temple; Obba Babatunde; Mariel Hemingway; James Remar; Omari Hardwick; Lynn Whitfield
- Release date: December 5, 2014

Lap Dance is a 2014 American drama produced by Datari Turner Productions and directed by Greg Carter. The film's ensemble cast includes Briana Evigan, Kenny Wormald, Robert Hoffman, Ali Cobrin, Datari Turner, James Remar, Mariel Hemingway, Omari Hardwick, Lynn Whitfield, Carmen Electra, Nia Peeples, Stacey Dash, Junie Hoang and LisaRaye.

== Plot ==
The film is described as a modern-day Indecent Proposal, and it revolves around Monica (Ali Cobrin), an aspiring actress who, in order to care for her cancer-stricken father, makes a pact with her fiancé to take a job as an exotic dancer. She is soon wooed by a wealthy patron named Chicago, who promises to set her up as an actress, much to the chagrin of his former favorite dancer Lexus (Carmen Electra).

== Cast ==
- Ali Cobrin as Monica Moore
- Briana Evigan as Tasha
- Robert Hoffman as Kevin Shepard
- Carmen Electra as Lexus
- Datari Turner as Chicago
- Mariel Hemingway as Aunt Billie
- James Remar as Patrick Moore
- Omari Hardwick as Dr. Don Cook
- Lynn Whitfield as Momma Pearl
- Nia Peeples as Kelly
- LisaRaye as Sugar
- K.D. Aubert as Jade Lee
- Omar Gooding as Black
- Lew Temple as Matt Ewing
- Kenny Wormald as Ray
- Stacey Dash as Dr. Annie Jones
- Dennis White as Pauly
- Obba Babatunde as Roscoe
- Keith Robinson as himself
- Wesley Jonathan as himself

Junie Hoang as Trudy, Brandi. Cameos for Leon Powe, Ron Jeremy, Quinton Aaron, Jonathan Daniel Brown as themselves. There are also a number of dancers listed in the closing credits.

== Production ==
The film was shot on location in Houston, Texas and Los Angeles in 2013. The producers of the film are Michael Becker, Gordon Bijelonic, Reggie Carter, H.M. Coakley, Camille C. Irons, Corey Large, Cain McKnight, Nenad Medic, Alan Pao, Phil Thornton, Steve Ware and Greg Carter.

The film was released theatrically released domestically by Entertainment One on December 5, 2014.
