= In Contempt =

- Also known as: Sullivan's Travels
- Genre: Legal drama
- Created by: Terri Kopp
- Written by: Terri Kopp
- Directed by: Farhad Mann
- Starring: Erica Ash; Christian Keyes; Richard Lawson; Mouna Traoré; Megan Hutchings; Tobias Truvillion; Eugene Clark
- Composer: Kurt Farquhar
- Original language: English
- No. of seasons: 1
- No. of episodes: 10

Production
- Executive producers: Daniel Iron; Terri Kopp; Lance Samuels
- Producers: Mary Anne Waterhouse; Brian Campbell; Priscilla Galvez; Stephen Raglow; Jamey Sinanan
- Cinematography: Kim Derko
- Running time: 42 minutes
- Production company: Blue Ice Pictures

Original release
- Network: BET
- Release: April 10 – June 12, 2018

In Contempt is a television show on BET created by Terri Kopp and starring Erica Ash. BET ordered 10 episodes straight-to-series. The series explores injustice in the American legal system. The series premiered on April 10, 2018. In September 2019, the series was canceled by BET after one season.

== Plot ==
Gwen Sullivan (Erica Ash) is an outspoken public defender working in a legal aid office in New York City. She manages her platonic, familial, and complicated past romantic relationship while navigating her fast-paced career.

== Cast and characters ==
- Erica Ash as Gwendolyn "Gwen" Sullivan, a public defender
- Richard Lawson as Earl Sullivan, Gwen's father, a retired judge
- Christian Keyes as Charles Theodore "Charlie" Riggs
- Megan Hutchings as Tracy Campbell, a public defender and Gwen's roommate
- Mouna Traoré as Vanessa Winters
- Tobias Truvillion as Bennett Thompson
- Daniel Kash as Tom Delgado, Gwen's boss
- Ronnie Rowe. Jr. as E.J Dashay, an Assistant District Attorney

=== Recurring ===
- Richard Lawson as Earl Sullivan, Gwen's father, a retired judge
- Jonathan Langdon as Jim Johnson, a court officer
- Rob Stewart as Judge Dotson
- Joy Tanner as Audrey Dotson, Judge Dotson's wife
- Shawn Lawrence as Judge Adler
- Genelle Williams as Alison Bontemps, Bennett's fiancé

== Episodes ==
No.	Title	Directed by	Written by	Original release date	U.S. viewers (millions)
1	"Welcome to Hell"	Farhad Mann	Terri Kopp	April 10, 2018	0.540
2	"Combat by Agreement"	Farhad Mann	Laurence Andries	April 17, 2018	0.468
3	"Confessions"	Sudz Sutherland	Terri Kopp & Evangeline Ordaz & Deb Swisher	April 24, 2018	0.466
4	"The Rules of Engagement"	Sudz Sutherland	David Feige	May 1, 2018	0.397
5	"Necessary Force"	Jill Carter	Maisha Closson	May 8, 2018	0.488
6	"Banned"	Jill Carter	Evangeline Ordaz	May 15, 2018	0.360
7	"Stop and Frisk"	Farhad Mann	Deb Swisher	May 22, 2018	0.468
8	"Burned Out"	Farhad Mann	Terri Kopp & Aaron Carew	May 29, 2018	0.472
9	"BLM, Part One"	Sudz Sutherland	Laurence Andries	June 5, 2018	0.501
10	"BLM, Part Two"	Sudz Sutherland	Terri Kopp	June 12, 2018	0.539

== Production ==
In Contempt is being written by Terri Kopp and produced in Canada. On September 25, 2019, BET officially canceled the series after one season.
