= Viper (rapper) =

American rapper

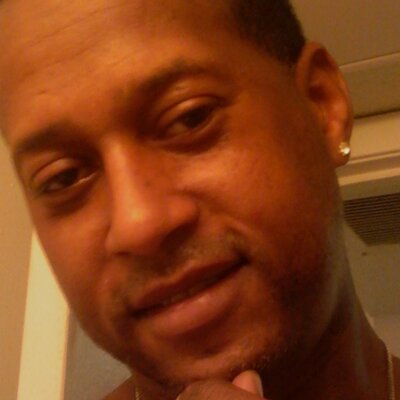
- Carter in 2015

Background information
- Also known as: Lee Dogg; Rapper Viper; Viper the Rapper; Viper the Unbreakable; Cobra; Diemondback; Vipes; J-Ride; DieManback
- Born: Lee Arthur Carter; October 7, 1971 (age 55); El Dorado, Arkansas, US
- Origin: Houston, Texas, US
- Genres: Hip-hop; outsider music; cloud rap; chopped and screwed; Southern hip-hop
- Occupations: Rapper; record producer; actor
- Instruments: FL Studio; Korg Triton; Yamaha Motif; Vocals
- Years active: 1997–present
- Labels: Rhyme Tyme; Chamber 38; Outsider Records; Broken Machine Films; Niceful Records

Lee Arthur Carter (born October 7, 1971), known professionally by his stage name Viper, is an American rapper, record producer, and actor. He is regarded as one of the originators of cloud rap.

Viper began releasing music in 2003, originally under the name Lee Dogg. He released the album You'll Cowards Don't Even Smoke Crack in 2008; it gained popularity in 2013 and became an Internet meme.

Carter was arrested on January 4, 2024, and initially charged with kidnapping a woman in his garage; these charges were later dropped for sexual assault and fraud charges, to which Carter pled guilty in 2025. He is currently serving a 15-year sentence and will not be eligible for parole until 2031.

== Background ==
Carter was born in El Dorado, Arkansas. He began playing the piano at the age of five. At the age of six, he relocated to the Hiram Clarke neighborhood of Houston, Texas, and started rapping at the age of nine.

In 1997, he was an actor in the film Fifth Ward, directed by his brother, Greg Carter.

== Career ==
Carter's first musical appearance was in 1997 on the soundtrack for Fifth Ward, under the name "J-Ride".

Under the alias Lee Dogg, Carter released Hustlin' Thick in the early 2000s. The Rhyme Time Records page credits the release to Lee Dogg, and Scaruffi describes the album as released under that name. Carter is also known by several aliases, including Viper.

Carter continued to release mixtapes regularly throughout the early 2000s under his Rhyme Tyme Records label through the CD Baby website, becoming one of the first cloud rap artists. Throughout this period, he showed frustration at his obscurity and limited exposure, as detailed on one of his early songs, "9900 Haters On The Wall", where he claimed out of ten thousand people who heard his albums on the site, only a hundred had bought them.

His obscurity would continue until early 2013, when the title track of his album You'll Cowards Don't Even Smoke Crack, released in 2008, was posted onto YouTube. Since then, it has garnered over four million views, and news outlets started reporting on him shortly after. You'll Cowards Don't Even Smoke Crack is by far Carter's most popular album. University of Notre Dame newspaper The Observer noted that the album became an "internet meme due to its shockingly upfront title and unique album cover".

Despite the heavily independent and lo-fi nature of the album, it received positive coverage in the music press. Sputnik Music wrote that the album fuses "a nostalgic and ethereal blend of cloud rap and vaporwave". The Chicago Reader wrote that the album is "outsider-artist genius. People on the Internet are initially drawn to Carter because of his blatant disregard for grammar, outrageously violent and drug-centric lyrics, and how sonically bizarre he is in general."

Since then, Carter has remained active, releasing almost an album per day on average in 2014, releasing his music through music streaming services and giving interviews to the independent music press. As of 2024, he has released more than 1,500 albums, although only a small fraction consist solely of original material.

In early 2019, he created a YouTube channel, named RapperViper VEVO, which mainly consists of fan-made music videos to his music. The channel also occasionally posts green screen videos of Carter, which fans can use to make their own videos. On May 3, 2025 Carter returned to YouTube and began uploading new music videos.

== Style ==
His low-budget, DIY aesthetic is present not only in his music but also its accompanying videos and album art, which frequently consist of simple self-portraits, clip art and his name and the album title superimposed in plain text.

Musically, he is recognized for his deep voice, occasional use of autotune, and slowed-down, low-fidelity and glitchy and ethereal production that predates cloud rap, and is reminiscent of the chopped and screwed subgenre native to Carter's Houston scene.

== Personal life ==
Carter's mother, Betty, died in 2021 at the age of 79. His father, Lymell Carter, was a preacher.

Carter has seven children and a greyhound dog named King.

== Legal issues ==
On April 7, 2023, police responded to a report of a woman being held against her will at Carter's residence and found the complainant in Carter's garage. The complainant reported that she had been held there for several years after Carter picked her up while she was panhandling. She also alleged that Carter had physically and sexually assaulted her and forced her to consume narcotics while she was captive. The woman escaped multiple times, but the police released her back to Carter after taking her to the hospital.

On January 4, 2024, Carter was arrested and charged with aggravated kidnapping. He was released on January 8 on a $100,000 bond, with an arraignment scheduled for February 13. His bond was revoked on January 25 after he violated court orders by repeatedly contacting the woman, and he was charged with third-degree violation of a protective order.

On January 8, 2024, police said that a woman's dead body had been found at Carter's residence in July 2023. However, they do not believe it to be related to the kidnapping and found that the woman had died of natural causes.

On February 29, 2024, Carter was charged with kidnapping and sexually assaulting another woman.

On April 17, 2025, Carter was convicted of sexual assault, fraud and violation of bond conditions, and sentenced to 15 years in a Texas Department of Criminal Justice prison. He will first be eligible for parole in 2031.

== Selected discography ==
Carter has released hundreds of albums. However, a vast majority of these releases contain songs that have been chopped and screwed, slowed down, or simply recycled and put under different names with no change to their content. Therefore, only releases that contain original material have been listed here.

=== Individual releases ===
This is a list of studio albums by Viper that are wholly made up of original content. The 2013 albums Kill Urself My Man and I Have the Best Piece and Chain Ever Made! are mostly non-original, but contain 7 original songs between them.

- Hustlin' Thick (2003, originally under the name Lee Dogg)
- Ready and...Willing (2006)
- Heartless Hoodlum (2006)
- The Southwest Hooligan (2006)
- You'll Cowards Don't Even Smoke Crack (2008)
- The Paper Man (2008)
- The Hiram Clarke Hustler (2009)
- These Rappers Claim They Hard When Them Fags Never Even Seen the Pen (2010)
- 5–9 Piru Music: The Gang, the Album, the Label (2012)
- Kill Urself My Man and I Have the Best Piece and Chain Ever Made! (partially) (2013)
- Rich and NOT Famous (2013)
- Tha Top Malla (2015)
- Death from in Front (2016)
- Shed Skin: Tha Hidden Treasures, Vol. 1 (1997–2017) (2022)
- Thug's Renditions: Tha Hidden Treasures, Vol. 2 (2017–2018) (2022)
- Pussy Boy Ill Kill Ya (All I Need Is Tha Money): Tha Hidden Treasures, Vol. 3 (2018–2022) (2022)
- You'll Cowards Don't Even Smoke Crack 3 (2023)
- Y'all Cowards Don't Even Smoke Crack IV (You'll Cowards Don't Even Smoke Crack 4) (2024)
- You'll Cowards Don't Even Smoke Crack 5 (Y'all Cowards Don't Even Smoke Crack V) (2024)
- Black Jesus (2024)
- Crack Recipe (2026)

=== Collaborative releases ===
- Death 2 Snitches (EP) (with Nmesh) (2015)
- World Rap Star (with Nolan) (2017)
- Bout tha Money (with Broken Machine Films) (2018)
- They Hate Me Cuz I'm Vaporwave (with Nmesh and KOJA) (2018)
- Violent Behaviors Associated With Crack Cocaine Use (EP) (with corruptedhdd) (2022)
- Leftovers: Tha Hidden Treasures, Vol. 4 (EP) (2022)
- SELLIN CRACK 2 THE DAYCARE CENTER 2 (with boysknow15 and Floridian Records) (2026)

== Filmography ==
Title	Year	Role	Notes
Fifth Ward	1997	Rip	
Hustletown Mobbin	2003	Arms Dealer	Uncredited role

== See also ==
- Southern hip hop
- Chopped and screwed
