= Benjamin O. Jimerson-Phillips =

American film producer and director

Benjamin Jimerson-Phillips
- Born: Memphis, Tennessee
- Occupations: Director/Producer, Author
- Years active: 1984–present
- Children: 3

Benjamin O. Jimerson-Phillips, also known as Benjamin O. Jimerson, is an American movie producer, director, songwriter, and screenwriter. He was the owner of Jimerson & Associates, which was founded in 1995.

== Biography ==
Jimerson-Philips is the son of Jessie Jimerson-Phillips and Bishop James Olgethorpe Patterson, Sr. He attended Sabarbaro Elementary School (now known as Arthur Ashe School), in Chicago. Raised by his mother Jessie, he was exposed early on to the Christian church and strong religious values. He has a B.A. and Ph.D from Next Dimension University. Jimerson-Philips has three daughters.

He and Charles Allen produced a record titled "Undercover Lover" under the stage names "Captain Fantastic" and "Starr Fleet", first independently released on Right Note Records, then re-released in 2020 by Light in The Attic Records. Jimerson-Philips and Allen produced other records, including the 1988 release "Playmate" by Kimmi Kim, and the 1989 release of "Undercover Lover" on the I'm Out 4 Love album by Revea.

Jimerson-Philips has produced nine motion pictures. He worked on the 2005 biopic Resurrection: The J.R. Richard Story. He was involved in other media projects, including the comedy Player’s School, the reality series The House of Divas, and the war film Camp Logan.

Jimerson-Phillips was commissioned as a "Goodwill Ambassador" by Arkansas governors Jim Guy Tucker and Mike Huckabee. In early 2000, he ran for City Council of Little Rock, refusing to accept donations. In 2005, he was appointed as a "Colonel" on the Staff of New Mexico Governor Bill Richardson. He traveled with and represented Denise Matthews, also known as Vanity. He was honored in Special California State Senate Resolution #728 in 1991 and Resolution #1729 in 2006.

== Filmography ==
| Year | Title | Role |
|---|---|---|
| 2005 | Treasure n tha Hood | Co-Producer |
| 2005 | Resurrection: The J.R. Richard Story | Producer |
| 2007 | Waters Rising | Associate Producer |
| 2018, 2019 | 5th Ward (television series) | Associate Producer |
| 2018 | COGIC Pioneers Tribute (documentary) | Director |
| 2020 | A Royal Loss, The Prince Truth Documentary (documentary) | Director |

== Discography ==
| Year | Title | Label | Tracks |
|---|---|---|---|
| 1989 | "Revea" | Adept Records | "Undercover Lover" |
| 1988 | "Kimmi Kim" | Right Note Records | "Playmate" |
| 1984 | Captain Fantastic & Star Fleet (with Charles Allen, Lloyd Smith & Mark Bynum) | Right Note Records | "Undercover Lover" |
| 2020 | Captain Fantastic & Star Fleet (with Charles Allen, Lloyd Smith & Mark Bynum), re-release | Light in The Attic Records | "Undercover Lover" |

== Books ==
Jimerson-Phillips has self-published four books.

- Agape Coloring Activity Book of Prayers Puzzle Games (CreateSpace, 2012)
- Prodigal Son, Child of The King (CreateSpace, 2012)
- A Day in the Life... (CreateSpace, 2011)
- Player's School Book of Game (CreateSpace, 2011)
