= Shane R. Jimerson =

American psychologist

Shane Jimerson Ph.D.
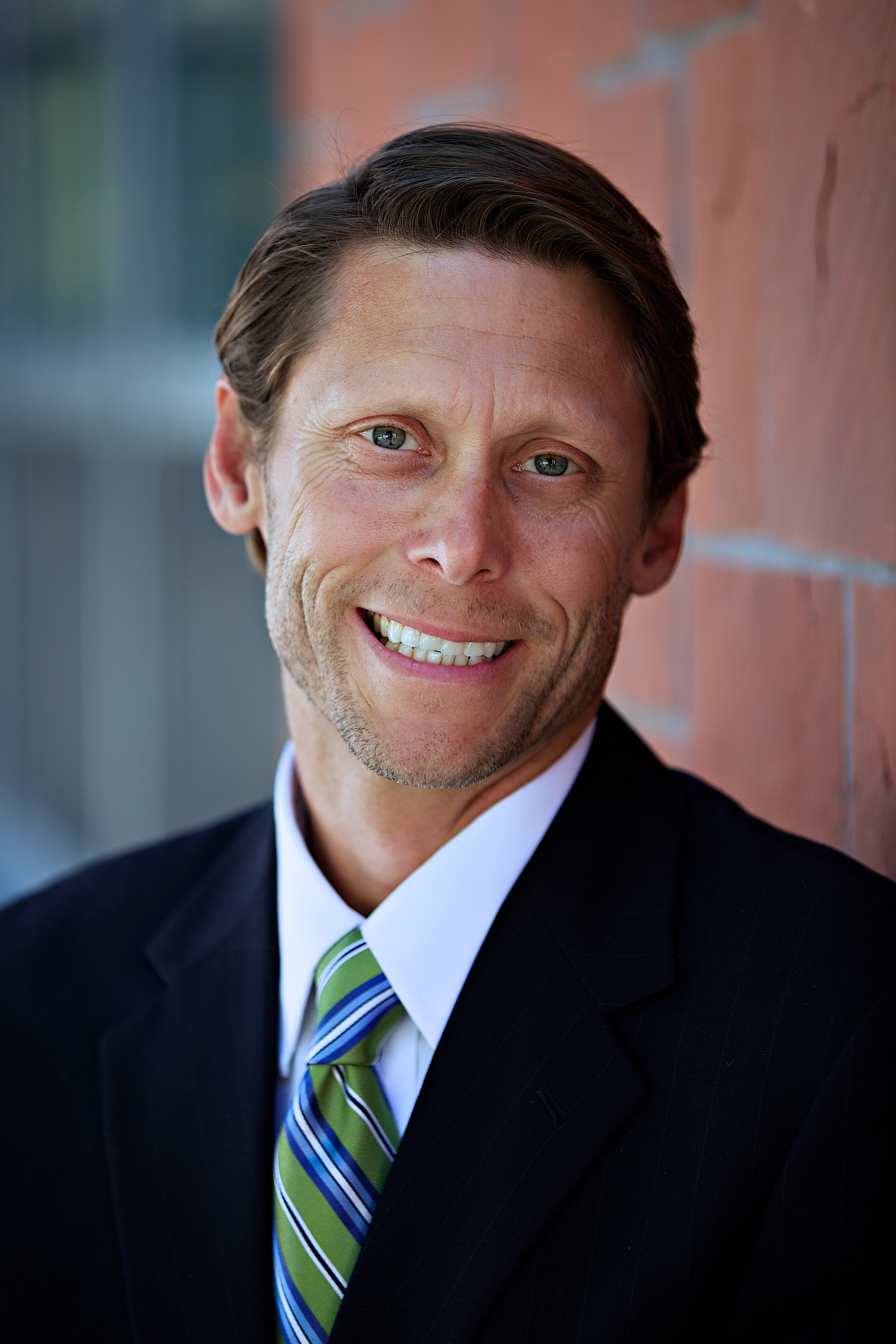
- Shane R, Jimerson
- Citizenship: United States
- Education: University of California, Berkeley; University of Minnesota, Minneapolis
- Known for: Treatment of traumatic stress
- Awards: Division 16 Outstanding Service Awards; President’s Award of Excellence; Award of Excellence for Distinguished Contributions to School Crisis Management; Outstanding International Psychologist Award; Outstanding Early Career Scholar Awards; Tom Oakland Distinguished Mid-Career Scholar Award; Outstanding Trainer Award
- Scientific career
- Fields: Psychology
- Workplaces: University of California, Santa Barbara

Shane R. Jimerson is a professor of Counseling, Clinical, and School Psychology in the Gevirtz Graduate School of Education at the University of California, Santa Barbara.

== Education and academic career ==
Jimerson earned a B.A. in psychology with a minor in education from the University of California, Berkeley in 1992. He earned an M.A. in Child Development in 1994 and doctoral degrees in school psychology and child development in 1997 from the University of Minnesota, Minneapolis.

== Publications ==
He is the author of over 400 publications.

== Curriculum ==
In collaboration with other school-psychology researchers and a filmmaker Jimerson created the Promoting Positive Peer Relationships Bullying-Prevention Program, which includes curricula for the classroom, professional development and parent and community outreach.

== Boards and committees ==
- President of the Society for the Study of School Psychology (2019-2021, elect, president, past)
- President of the International School Psychology Association (2013-2018, elect, president, past)
- President, Division 16 (School Psychology), American Psychological Association (2012)
- Vice-president for Convention Affairs and Public Relations, Division 16 (School Psychology), American Psychological Association (2008–2010)
- President-elect, International School Psychology Association
- Chair, Research Committee, International School Psychology Association (2000–present)
- Chair, Division 16 (School Psychology) conference proceedings, 2005 American Psychological Association Conference
- Chair, 2005 Division 16 Lightner Witmer Award Committee
- Chair, School Psychology Research Collaboration Conference (2003 and 2005)

== Books ==
- Mayer, M. J. & Jimerson, S. R. (2019). School Safety and Violence Prevention: Science, Practice, and Policy. Washington DC: American Psychological Association.
- Brown, J. A. & Jimerson, S. R. (2017). Supporting Bereaved Students at School. Oxford, UK: Oxford University Press.
- Brock, S. E., Nickerson, A. B., Reeves, M. A. L., Conolly-Wilson, C., Jimerson, S. R., Pesce, R. C., & Lazzaro, B. (2016). School crisis prevention and intervention: The PREPaRE model (2nd ed.). Bethesda, MD: National Association of School Psychologists.
- Jimerson, S. R., Burns, M. K, & VanDerHeyden, A. M. (Eds) (2016). The Handbook of Response to Intervention: Science and Practice of Multi Tiered Systems of Support 2nd Edition. New York: Springer Science.
- Hart, S., Brock, S. E., & Jeltova, H. (2013). Identifying, Assessing, and Treating Bipolar Disorder at School. New York: Springer Science. In the Developmental Psychopathology at School book series, Edited by Shane Jimerson and Stephen Brock
- Jimerson, S. R., Oakland, T. D., & Farrell, P. T. (Eds) (2013). 世界の学校心理学事典 (The Handbook of International School Psychology). Tokyo: Akashi Shoten.
- Jimerson, S. R., Nickerson, A. B., Mayer, M. J., & Furlong, M. J. (Eds) (2012). Handbook of School Violence and School Safety: International Research and Practice (2nd Edition). New York: Taylor and Francis.
- Brock, S. E., & Jimerson S. R. (Eds.) (2012). Best Practices in School Crisis Prevention and Intervention (2nd Edition). Bethesda, MD: National Association of School Psychologists.
- Miller, D. & Brock, S. E. (2011). Identifying, Assessing, and Treating Self-Injury at School. New York: Springer Science. In the Developmental Psychopathology at School book series, Edited by Shane Jimerson and Stephen Brock
- Li, H., Pearrow, M., & Jimerson, S. R. (2010). Identifying, Assessing, and Treating Early Onset Schizophrenia at School. New York: Springer Science. In the Developmental Psychopathology at School book series, Edited by Shane Jimerson and Stephen Brock
- Jimerson, S. R., Swearer, S. M., & Espelage, D. L. (Eds) (2010). The Handbook of Bullying in Schools: An International Perspective. New York: Routledge.
- Brock, S. E., Nickerson, A. B., Reeves, M. A., Jimerson, S. R., Lieberman, R., & Feinberg, T. (2009). School Crisis Prevention and Intervention: The PREPaRE Model. Bethesda, MD: National Association of School Psychologists.
- Brock, S. E., Jimerson, S. R., & Hansen, R. (2009). Identifying, Assessing, and Treating Attention Deficit Hyperactivity Disorder (ADHD) at School. New York: Springer Science. In the Developmental Psychopathology at School book series, Edited by Shane Jimerson and Stephen Brock
- Nickerson, A. B., Reeves, M. A., Brock, S. E., & Jimerson, S. R. (2009). Identifying, Assessing, and Treating Post Traumatic Stress Disorder (PTSD) at School. New York: Springer Science. In the Developmental Psychopathology at School book series, Edited by Shane Jimerson and Stephen Brock
- Christo, C., Davies, J., & Brock, S. E. (2009). Identifying, Assessing, and Treating Dyslexia at School. New York: Springer Science. In the Developmental Psychopathology at School book series, Edited by Shane Jimerson and Stephen Brock
- Hughes, T. L., Crothers, L. M., & Jimerson, S. R. (2008). Identifying, Assessing, and Treating Conduct Disorder at School. New York: Springer Science. In the Developmental Psychopathology at School book series, Edited by Shane Jimerson and Stephen Brock
- Jimerson, S. R., Burns, M. K, & VanDerHeyden, A. M. (Eds) (2007). Handbook of Response to Intervention: The Science and Practice of Assessment and Intervention. New York: Springer Science.
- Jimerson, S. R., Oakland, T. D., & Farrell, P. T. (Eds) (2007). The Handbook of International School Psychology. London: SAGE.
- Jimerson, S. R., & Furlong, M. J. (Eds) (2006). Handbook of School Violence and School Safety: From Research to Practice. Mahwah, New Jersey. Lawrence Erlbaum Associates, Inc.
- Brock, S. E., Jimerson, S., & Hansen, R. (2006). Identifying, Assessing, and Treating Autism at School. New York: Springer Science.
- Brock, S. E., Lazarus, P. J., & Jimerson S. R. (Eds.) (2002). Best Practices in School Crisis Prevention and Intervention. Bethesda, MD: National Association of School Psychologists.
- Lehmann, L., Jimerson, S., & Gaasch, A. (2001). The mourning child grief support group curriculum: Teens together version. Philadelphia, PA: Brunner & Routledge.
- Lehmann, L., Jimerson, S., & Gaasch, A. (2001). The mourning child grief support group curriculum: Middle childhood version. Philadelphia, PA: Brunner & Routledge.
- Lehmann, L., Jimerson, S., & Gaasch, A. (2001). The mourning child grief support group curriculum: Early childhood version. Philadelphia, PA: Brunner & Routledge.
- Lehmann, L., Jimerson, S., & Gaasch, A. (2001). The mourning child grief support group curriculum: Denny the Duck preschool version. Philadelphia, PA: Brunner & Routledge.
- Lehmann, L., Jimerson, S., & Gaasch, A. (2001). Grief support group curriculum facilitators handbook. Philadelphia, PA: Brunner & Routledge.
