= You'll Cowards Don't Even Smoke Crack =

2008 studio album by Viper

Studio album by Viper
- Released: February 19, 2008
- Recorded: 2005–2007
- Genres: Cloud rap; chopped and screwed; experimental hip hop; outsider music
- Length: 55:02
- Labels: Rhyme Time Records; Animated Music; Chamber 38
- Producer: Viper

Viper chronology
The Southwest Hooligan (2006)	You'll Cowards Don't Even Smoke Crack (2008)	The Paper Man (2008)

You'll Cowards Don't Even Smoke Crack is the fifth studio album by American outsider rapper and record producer Viper. It was released on February 19, 2008, through his own homemade record label, Rhyme Time Records, and later released physically by indie record label Animated Music. It is the most well known of all of his albums, gathering a cult following in the years since its release. Viper himself has been quoted as saying it is his favorite album he has made.

== Background ==
Around 2005, while Viper was studying for his master's degree in business, he supposedly set himself a task of composing 1000 beats in three months. While it is unknown whether he achieved this goal, this experiment created material that was used for his early releases. This material was used in his albums Ready and... Willing, Heartless Hoodlum and The Southwest Hooligan, released in 2006, You'll Cowards Don't Even Smoke Crack and The Paper Man, released in 2008, and finally The Hiram Clarke Hustler, released in 2009. Viper returned to the material comprising You'll Cowards in 2007, and finished the album in that year.

The whole purpose of the album was really to show the gritty side of hiphop and the gritty side of rap, and actually I respect the fact now that people are seeing me as an artist and not a drug user or anything like that, because the whole purpose of the song, if you listen to it, it was about addressing anything that you have that you may be afraid of. Growing up as a kid I vowed to myself that I would never be afraid of anything.

— Viper (2015)

Viper made all the beats himself using only a Yamaha Motif keyboard and a Roland beat machine. According to Viper himself, the album's upfront lyricism allowed him to address controversial issues with society, such as his crack use and dealership at the time, violence, and his past gang membership with 5-9 Piru, a sub-group of the Bloods.

== Cover ==
The album's cover has become a popular reaction image and internet meme, along with many of Viper's other album covers, with people commonly making their own covers using the rapper's face. The back cover of the indie vinyl issue of the album consists of a fake Fox News report using one of Viper's selfies which he had sent out to fans.

The cover itself is a cropped and poorly scanned image of Viper's face sourced from the cover of his 2006 album The Southwest Hooligan.

== Reception ==
Professional ratings
Review scores
Source	Rating
Sputnikmusic	5/5

You'll Cowards Don't Even Smoke Crack and Viper in general remained relatively obscure throughout the 2000s, where he would host his albums on CD Baby to limited exposure. In early 2013, the title track was posted onto YouTube. Since then it has garnered over four million views, and news outlets started to report on the song and album in response.

You'll Cowards Don't Even Smoke Crack received positive coverage in the music press. Sputnik Music wrote that the album fuses "a nostalgic and ethereal blend of cloud rap and vaporwave". The Chicago Reader wrote that the album is "outsider-artist genius. People on the Internet are initially drawn to Viper because of his blatant disregard for grammar, outrageously violent and drug-centric lyrics, and how sonically bizarre he is in general."

You'll Cowards Don't Even Smoke Crack is Viper's most successful album—it became an internet meme due to the quality of its album cover and title, which has been noted as being "shockingly upfront". The title track is also particularly famous online for its lyrical content, production, and vocal delivery.

== Physical release ==
The album was later remastered and released through the indie record label Animated Music in 2018 celebrating the album's 10th anniversary, with inserts signed by Viper. Viper also self-released a vinyl pressing of the album later in 2021, after promoting them on his Bandcamp as far back as 2018 without actually selling them. Handmade cassettes and CDs have since been available for purchase at Viper's live shows and online at his editor's Outsider Records store.

== Sequels and plans for 100 in total ==
In 2022, Viper announced a sequel album, entitled Ya'll Cowards Don't Even Smoke Crack (You'll Cowards Don't Even Smoke Crack II). It was set to release on December 25, 2022, but has been repeatedly delayed. Viper claims that the bulk of material on the album was written around the time his mother died, and some songs focus heavily on his loss, making him reluctant to finish the album. The latest release date is October 10, 2024, which is his late mother's birthday.

Instead of being inactive for this period, Viper instead skipped straight to its 3rd installment, You'll Cowards Don't Even Smoke Crack 3, released on September 29, 2023, which he recorded as a warmup, intending to release 100 entries in the series, each with 15 songs and original material.

On December 1, 2023, Viper released You'll Cowards Don't Even Smoke Crack 4.1.

On January 11, 2024, (a week after being arrested and charged with aggravated kidnapping) Viper released You'll Cowards Don't Even Smoke Crack 5.1.1.

On January 27, 2025, Viper released 你们这些胆小鬼连可卡因都不会抽, a Chinese version of the original You'll Cowards Don't Even Smoke Crack.

== Track listing ==
All tracks are written by Lee Carter.

No.	Title	Length
1.	"You'll Cowards Don't Even Smoke Crack"	4:23
2.	"I Sell Dope Boy"	3:36
3.	"That There's a Stash Spot"	3:45
4.	"I Ball for Gunshots"	3:48
5.	"I'm That S-West Blood"	3:31
6.	"This Is How I Ball"	3:27
7.	"Merciless"	3:42
8.	"I Like the Way"	3:23
9.	"I'm Rich Already 4 Life"	3:14
10.	"Parlayin'"	3:08
11.	"You Actin' Like a Bitch Ass Nigga"	3:02
12.	"My Money Rolls^{[a]}"	1:59
13.	"I'm a Gangsta"	4:05
14.	"I'm Gone Sting"	4:57
15.	"That Baller Out Your Best Side"	5:02
Total length:		55:02

- ^{a} On some original issues, this track is also labelled as "Parlayin'".

== Personnel ==
Credits for You'll Cowards Don't Even Smoke Crack adapted from liner notes.

- Lee A. Carter – vocals, writer, composer, producer, album art

Animated Music issue

- Will Killingsworth – remastering
- Brian Baynes – back artwork, layout
