= Douglas Jimerson =

American concert tenor and musicologist

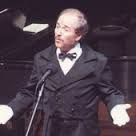

Background information
- Genres: American music
- Occupation: Tenor

Douglas Jimerson is an American concert tenor and musicologist, who specializes in historical and patriotic American music.

He is best known for his many recordings of music of the Civil War, accompanied by such artists as the U.S. Navy Band; the Federal City Brass Band; the Wildcat Regiment Band; the Sunrise String Quartet; Civil War Comrades; Gilmore's Light Ensemble; Ruth Locker, pianist; Harvey Jacobson, pianist; Garrick Alden, guitarist; Clarke Buehling and Bob Clayton, banjoists; and Ellen Anderson on hammered dulcimer.

== Career ==
Jimerson began his career singing with the Washington Opera, and gave his debut recital at Carnegie Hall in January 1996. He was well received in New York and obtained his first major accolade with a positive review of his Carnegie Hall recital by The New York Times. He has performed various times at the Kennedy Center and is a regular performer for the National Park Service for historical events and national and state holidays.

Jimerson is a Lincoln scholar. He has recorded several CDs of the music enjoyed by Abraham Lincoln, has been interviewed by National Public Radio about Lincoln and music, and is publishing a biography about Abraham Lincoln. He sings in the tenor range and rarely has been known to sing in falsetto.

== Performances ==
His performance entitled "Jimerson Live at the Kennedy Center" was attended by thousands. He sang 12 of his most popular songs composed by a variety of artists. This performance was later compiled into an album released in 2004 by AmeriMusic.

He has recorded dozens of patriotic tunes, and his renditions have found a broader public through licensing on major venues. His production of "Hail to the Chief" on his God Bless America CD was licensed and used in the 2009 Broadway play You're Welcome America — A Final Night with George W. Bush, starring Will Ferrell, and in the 2009 HBO broadcast of the show.

== Albums ==
- The Civil War (2000)
- America (2001)
- Stephen Foster: A Family Album (2004)
- Abraham Lincoln (2004)
- Beethoven (2004)
- Franz Schubert: Die Schöne Müllerin (2004)
- God Bless America (2005)
- White Christmas (2005)
- Civil War (2007)
- Lincoln Portrait (2008)
- Amore (2008)
- Robert E. Lee Remembered
- George Washington Portrait in Song
- Lincoln's Favorite Music
- Jimerson Live at the Kennedy Center
- Stephen Foster's America

== Notable songs ==
- "Home! Sweet Home!", by Thomas Payne (music by Henry Bishop)
- "The Battle Hymn of the Republic", by Julia Ward Howe
- "The Battle Cry of Freedom", by George F. Root
- "I Wish I Was in Dixie's Land", by Daniel Emmett
- "The Bonnie Blue Flag", by Harry McCarthy
- "The Vacant Chair", by George F. Root and Henry Washburn
- "Beautiful Dreamer", by Stephen C. Foster

== Reviews ==
- Comfort and Denial In a Fast-Changing World: "Stephen Foster's America", concert review in The New York Times, January 16, 1996
- The South, and the North, Rise Again, concert review in The Washington Post, March 13, 2001
- Stephen Foster Returned, concert review in The Washington Post, September 26, 1995
