= Annette P. Jimerson =

American painter

Annette Jimerson
- Born: October 12, 1966 (age 58); Chicago, Illinois, United States
- Education: University of Memphis, Milwaukee Institute of Art & Design
- Known for: Painting, Drawing

Annette Jimerson (born 1966) is an American artist who works in a wide variety of media. However, she is known for her whimsical and prolific painting abilities, both realist and abstract. Primarily painting in acrylic and oils, she also makes watercolor works, with subjects ranging from still life, landscapes and portraits to abstracts. She also works in pen and ink, colored pencils and sculptures. Her work has been described as "incredibly lifelike, reviving and breathtaking" (Weems Art Gallery).

Jimerson also writes and creates illustrations for children's books, an occupation that started as a "hobby" and grew from there.

== Biography ==
Trademarkeyes Acrylic on Canvas, 12"x 12"

Jimerson discovered her artistic abilities at the age of seven, and has been developing her artistic skills ever since, branching off into a variety of media. "It was her early age fascination with drawing eyes with detailed eyebrows, eyelids and colors that brought attention to the skillful young artist." When her work was seen at the Memphis University Fine Arts Department, the chairman said that they had "never seen anyone so young paint with such experience."

For the next several years Jimerson was accepted into several galleries across the United States, and featured in many art shows selling many paintings, gaining newspaper and news station coverage with several different press releases, including Channel 7 News, The Perspective and the Cedar Rapids Gazette. Damon Hitchcock, the art professor at San Diego City College, who had 24 years' experience teaching, once gathered the whole drawing class of 33 to watch Jimerson work, stating she was "the most prolific artist he had seen."

== Education ==
- 1987-1988 San Diego City/Mesa - College, San Diego, California
- 1986 Milwaukee Institute of Art & Design, Milwaukee, Wisconsin.
- 1975 University of Memphis, Memphis, Tennessee
- 1975 Artist Summer Camp, Memphis, Tennessee

== Exhibitions ==
- 2012 Blick, 75 Artist of all Times (magazine), feature.
- 2012 Art Price, Art Showcase, Paris, France
- 2007 Weem's Art Gallery, Albuquerque, New Mexico, USA
- 2007, ABQ Art Review, Albuquerque, New Mexico, USA
- 2006 The Perspective (newspaper spread) "Annette Jimerson: A Picture of an Artist" (issue 7, volume 5, pg 22-33), Albuquerque, New Mexico, USA
- 1993 Contemperena Art Gallery, Jacksonville, Florida, USA
- 1993 Channel 7 News Station (news coverage), "Annette Jimerson", Jacksonville, Florida, USA
- 1993 Berisford Art Gallery, Jacksonville, Florida, USA
- 1993 The Wildlife Gallery, Orlando, Florida, USA
- 1992 Peppertree Art Gallery, Cedar Rapids, Iowa, USA
- 1992 Cedar Rapids Gazette, newspaper spread "Artist looks to Iowa for a better life " (volume 110, NO 188, pg 60), Cedar Rapids, Iowa, USA
- 1992 Wildlife Art Gallery, Westdale exhibit Cedar Rapids, Iowa, USA
- 1991 Art Show: Annette Jimerson, San Diego, California, USA

== Books and films ==
- Annette Jimerson Art Works (Create Space, 2013)
- Mr. Cuphead (Create Space, 2012)
- The Pretty Red Flower with a Single Thorn (Create Space, 2012)
- Resurrection: The J.R. Richard Story (film) (Bellinger-Bethea X Films, 2005)
