= Greg Carter (filmmaker) =

American film director

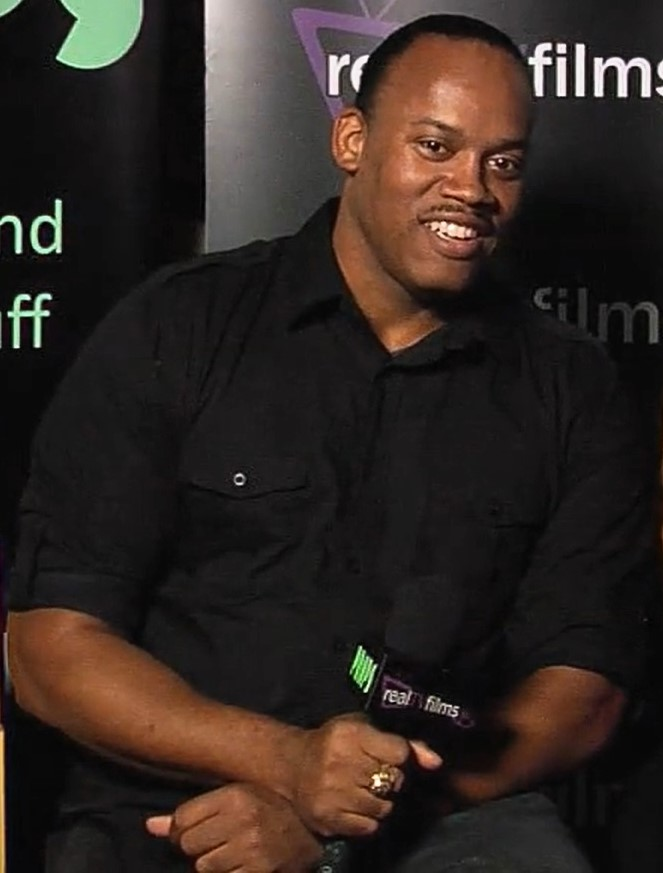
- Carter in 2012
- Born: Nestor Gregory Carter
- Education: Texas A&M University
- Occupation: Filmmaker
- Relatives: Viper (brother)
- Website: nexus-films.com

Nestor Gregory Carter, professionally known as Greg Carter, is an American filmmaker from Texas who has produced more than nineteen feature films and documentaries, nine of which he directed and six he wrote. He is a native of Houston. Carter has been inducted into the Texas Filmmakers' Hall of Fame in 2006, in recognition of his film and community contributions.

== Early life ==
Carter initially studied film while pursuing a degree in Engineering from Texas A&M University, where he studied under Pulitzer Prize-winning playwright Charles Gordone. After graduating, Carter went on to further his education at Rice University's Department of Visual and Dramatic Arts. He is the brother of influential cloud rapper Viper, who also starred in his first film, Fifth Ward.

== Career ==
Carter filmed his first feature, Fifth Ward, in 1997. He co-produced the 2012 film Dysfunctional Friends. He is the producer of The Concerto, a film that stars Janel Parrish (Pretty Little Liars) and Jackson Rathbone (Twilight), among others. Lap Dance, Carter's latest directorial effort, is based on events in the lives of him and his girlfriend, actress Junie Hoang prior to their move to Los Angeles in 2005. Lap Dance was written, directed and co-produced by Carter. As of August 2014, Carter is working on the feature length documentary Michael Vick: Giving Back.

Occasionally, Carter teaches filmmaking. For instance to underprivileged youths, through his association with SWAMP. He founded Fifth Ward Young Filmmakers in 1992, and he and producer Elizabeth Avellán participated in a youth filmmaker instruction program at the MFAH.

== Awards ==
Carter received various awards. For his film Fifth Ward (Best Director and Best Film; 30th Parallel Film Festival), Resurrection: The J.R. Richard Story (Best Feature; WorldFest-Houston International Film Festival) and Waters Rising (Best Docudrama; San Diego Black Film Festival).

== Filmography ==
| Year | Title | Role | Note |
|---|---|---|---|
| (announced) | Open All Night | producer | |
| 2014 | The Concerto | producer | |
| 2014 | Pretty Perfect | co-producer | |
| 2014 | Lap Dance | co-executive producer | |
| 2012 | Bully | associate producer | |
| 2012 | Dysfunctional Friends | producer | |
| 2012 | Coast to Coast Cheerleaders | producer | TV series |
| 2012 | Exotic Dancers of Houston | producer | TV series |
| 2011 | Michael Vick: Giving Back | producer | |
| 2010 | A Gang Land Love Story | producer | |
| 2010 | After the Storm | producer | short |
| 2008 | I American Dream | producer | |
| 2007 | Gus and Rose: Reflections of Hurricane Katrina | executive producer / producer | video documentary |
| 2007 | Waters Rising | producer | |
| 2006 | The Hand We've Been Dealt: Borderline Houston | producer | documentary |
| 2005 | The Making of 'Treasure n tha Hood' | co-producer | video short |
| 2005 | Treasure n tha Hood | producer | |
| 2005 | Behind the Scenes: Project Streetlight | producer | video documentary |
| 2005 | My Big Phat Hip Hop Family | co-producer | |
| 2005 | Resurrection: The J.R. Richard Story | producer-director | |
| 2004 | Diggin' for Dollars | associate producer | video |
| 2004 | Survival of the Illest | producer | |
| 2003 | Hustletown Mobbin' | executive producer | video |
| 2002 | Diamonds from the Bantus | producer | |
| 2001 | Thug Life | producer | |
| 1997 | Fifth Ward | producer-director | |
