= Nephew Tommy =

American comedian, actor, producer (born 1967)

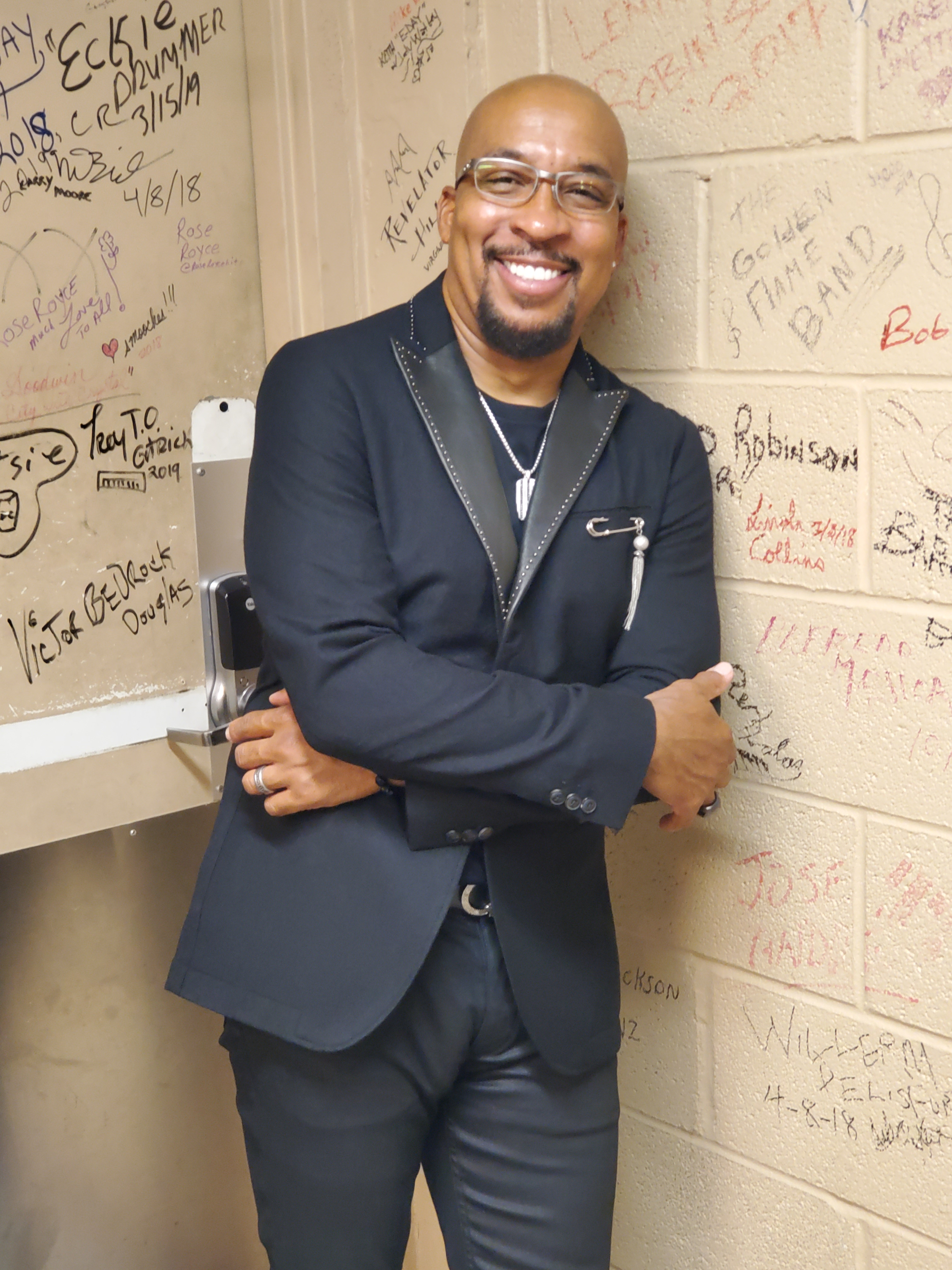
- Nephew Tommy in 2019
- Born: Thomas Miles; May 18, 1967 (age 59); Houston, Texas, U.S.
- Occupations: Comedian; actor; producer
- Spouse: Jacqueline Miles (m. 2016)
- Children: 3
- Relatives: Steve Harvey (uncle)
- Website: thomasmiles.com

Thomas "Nephew Tommy" Miles (born May 18, 1967) is an American comedian, actor and producer. He currently co-hosts The Steve Harvey Morning Show during which he frequently makes prank phone calls. He is the nephew of comedian Steve Harvey, which is where his stage name comes from.

== Education ==
Nephew Tommy studied theatre at Texas A&M University.

== Discography ==
- Nephew Tommy's Prank Phone Calls: Volume 1
- Nephew Tommy's Prank Phone Calls: Volume 2
- The Best of Nephew Tommy's Prank Phone Calls: Volume 3
- Nephew Tommy's Prank Phone Calls: Volume 4
- Nephew Tommy's Prank Phone Calls: Volume 5 - Church Folks Gotta Laugh Too!
- Nephew Tommy's Prank Phone Calls: Volume 6 - Cheaters
- Nephew Tommy's Celebrity Prank Phone Calls
- Nephew Tommy's Lost Prank Phone Calls: Part 1
- Nephew Tommy's Lost Prank Phone Calls: Part 2
- Won't He Do It

== See also ==
- Thug Life – 2001 American crime drama film in which Miles stars
