= Fifth Ward (film) =

- Directed by: Greg Carter
- Written by: Greg Carter
- Produced by: Greg Carter; Betty Carter; John Sherman Jr.
- Starring: Kory Washington; Thomas Miles; Donna Wilkerson; Thomas Webb; Junie Hoang; Lee Carter
- Cinematography: John Darbonne
- Edited by: Rwanna Barnes
- Music by: Randy Washington; Lee Carter
- Production companies: Jumpstart Productions; Nexus Entertainment
- Distributed by: York Entertainment (United States); Elephant Films (France)
- Release date: October 3, 1997 (United States)
- Running time: 110 minutes
- Country: United States
- Language: English

Fifth Ward is a 1997 drama film written, directed and produced by Greg Carter and starring Kory Washington, Thomas Miles, Donna Wilkerson, Thomas Webb, Junie Hoang, and Lee Carter. It follows an African-American man in the Fifth Ward ghetto of Houston entering a life of crime for a chance to kill the man who killed his brother. Fifth Ward was Greg Carter's first feature film which he wrote, produced, edited, and shot on 35mm.

It was shown at the Austin Film Festival on October 3, 1997, and later won Best Feature at the Black Film Festival of New Orleans. At 30th Parallel Film Festival in Austin, it also picked up awards for Best Director and Feature. In 1998, Fifth Ward was selected into the SXSW Film Festival. A TV sequel to the film, 5th Ward The Series started airing on UMC on March 2, 2018.

== Plot ==
An African-American male in the ghettos of Houston struggles with opportunities to enter a life of crime including a chance to kill the man who killed his brother.

== Cast ==
- Kory Washington as James
- Thomas Miles as Toney
- Donna Wilkerson as Mina
- Thomas Webb as Earl
- Junie Hoang as Haan
- Lee Carter as Rip
- Creepa as Bam
- JaCorrey Lovelady as Lil T
- Louis Gusemano as Gibson
- Steve Green as Lindsey
- Black Prince as Jimmy
- Kelley Darbonne as Secretary
- Karman Jones as Crack Head With a Baby
- DJ Screw as himself

== Release ==
Fifth Ward was shown at the Austin Film Festival on October 3, 1997. It was later shown at the New Orleans Black Film Festival where it won Best Picture. The movie was later distributed by York/Maverick Entertainment and released nationwide in March 2000 to Blockbuster and Hollywood Video and later ran on BET Action PPV.

== Reception ==
When screened at the SXSW Film Festival, Fifth Ward received mixed reviews. Despite "good intentions", Variety referred to the film as "crudely amateurish." Similarly, The Austin Chronicle echoed the same sentiments, commenting, "Despite Fifth Ward's ambitious style and noble, socially conscious storyline" it is "a messy mix of bad lighting, muddy sound, and thudding hip hop that sounds like it was recorded in a closet." In spite of reviews, the movie was distributed by York/Maverick Entertainment and released nationwide in March 2000 to Blockbuster and Hollywood Video and later ran on BET Action PPV.

== Sequel ==
A TV sequel to the film, 5th Ward The Series, started airing on UMC on March 2, 2018, and consisted of six episodes. The series was renewed for a second season which also consisted of six episodes and aired between summer and fall in 2020.
