= Hoang v. Amazon.com, Inc. =

2011 lawsuit against IMDb.com and its parent company Amazon.com

Hoang v. Amazon.com, Inc. et al.
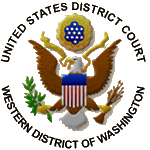
- Court: United States District Court for the Western District of Washington
- Full case name: Huong Hoang v. Amazon.com, Inc. and IMDb.com, Inc.,
- Decided: April 11, 2013
- Citations: no. 11-cv-01709, (W.D. Wash., filed Oct. 13, 2011) no. 13-35390, (9th Cir., filed May 6, 2013)

Holding
- Jury verdict; IMDb did not breach its contract with plaintiff by publishing her true date of birth

Court membership
- Judge sitting: Marsha J. Pechman

Keywords
- internet privacy, breach of contract

Hoang v. Amazon.com, Inc. et al. (initially filed as Doe v. Amazon.com, Inc. et al.) is a lawsuit brought by actress Junie Hoang in October 2011 against IMDb.com and its parent company Amazon.com for revealing her true date of birth, which she said opened her up to age discrimination. In March 2013, all of her claims against Amazon and all but one of her claims against IMDb were dismissed, and in April 2013, a jury found that IMDb was not liable for the remaining claim for breach of contract; the verdict was upheld on appeal.

== Lawsuit ==
Hoang, whose real name is Huong Hoang (Vietnamese: Hoàng Hương), is a Vietnamese-American actress. She had small parts in films such as Gingerdead Man 3: Saturday Night Cleaver and Hoodrats 2: Hoodrat Warriors.

In October 2011, Hoang filed a lawsuit in the U.S. District Court for the Western District of Washington against the Internet Movie Database (IMDb) and its parent company Amazon.com, alleging that IMDb had accessed her account information to obtain her true birth date (July 16, 1971), then displayed it as part of the information on her entry as an actress. Her complaint alleged that the use of her account information was wrongful and that publication of the information would cause her to suffer age discrimination in casting.

Hoang's lawsuit was originally filed under the name "Jane Doe", but in December 2011, U.S. District Judge Marsha J. Pechman in Seattle dismissed the original lawsuit with leave to refile under her own name, saying the actress had no grounds to proceed with an anonymous complaint. On January 6, 2012, Hoang refiled, revealing her name.

In March 2013, Judge Pechman granted Amazon's motion for summary judgment, releasing it from the case; and IMDb's motion for summary judgment on Hoang's Washington state's Consumer Protection Act claim and emotional distress claims. The case went to trial on April 9, 2013 on the remaining cause of action, IMDb's alleged breach of contract, with IMDb as the sole defendant. On April 11, 2013, a federal jury in Seattle rejected the breach of contract claim.

== Appeal ==
In May 2013, Hoang filed a notice of appeal in the case. Hoang's opening brief was filed on October 30, and IMDb's answering brief was filed December 24; Hoang voluntarily dismissed Amazon.com from the appeal on November 4. Hoang's reply brief was filed February 3, 2014.

There were two motions made to file amicus curiae briefs in support of Hoang; one by four screenwriters David Ransil, Brad Markowitz, Steven Tag Mendillo and Mark Lisson on November 20; and one by the Screen Actors Guild (SAG), the American Federation of Television and Radio Artists (AFTRA) and the Writers Guild of America, West (WGAW) on November 25. Both motions were denied, because they did not address the ground on which Hoang had appealed.

Oral argument in the case was held in Seattle on February 6, 2015. The Ninth Circuit panel was composed of circuit judges Carlos Bea and Mary H. Murguia, and district judge William H. Orrick III, sitting by designation.

On March 27, 2015, the Ninth Circuit panel unanimously affirmed the decision in favor of IMDb.

== Reaction and aftermath ==
Two actors' unions, SAG and AFTRA, supported Hoang, saying that IMDb was "facilitating age discrimination".

After the lawsuit was decided, the unions pressed the California legislature to enact legislation requiring Internet sites to remove birth dates and ages of entertainers upon their request. The legislature enacted the law, Assembly Bill 1687, in September 2016. In February 2018, U.S. District Judge Vince Chhabria struck down the law as violating the First Amendment. In June 2020, the Ninth Circuit affirmed Chhabria's judgement, holding that the statute was an unconstitutional content-based restriction that violated the First Amendment.
