= Put a ring on it =

Put a ring on it may refer to:

- "Single Ladies (Put a Ring on It)", 2008 Beyoncé song
- "Put a Ring on It", a The Game episode, see List of The Game episodes
- "Put a Ring on It", a Scandal season 4 episode
- A euphemism for marriage proposal
