= Gilles Marini =

French actor (born 1976)

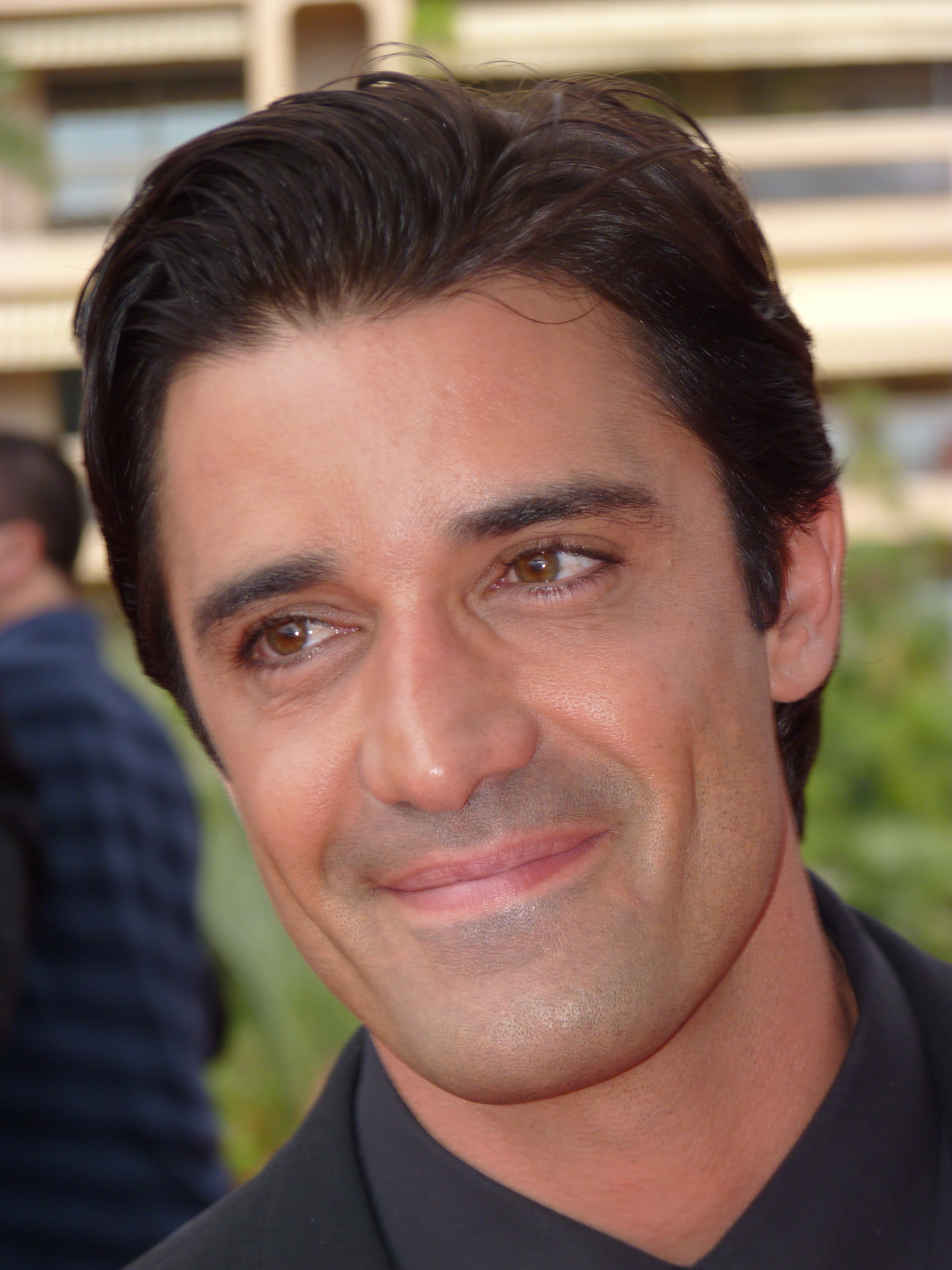
- Marini at the 2012 Monte-Carlo Television Festival
- Born: 26 January 1976 (age 50); Grasse, Alpes-Maritimes, France
- Occupation: Actor
- Years active: 2004–present
- Spouse: Carole Marini (m. 1998)
- Children: 2
- Website: www.gillesmarini.com

Gilles Marini (/ʒiːl məˈriːni/; born 26 January 1976) is a French actor known for his roles in the film Sex and the City, and in the American television shows Brothers & Sisters, Switched at Birth and Devious Maids. He was also the runner-up in season 8 of Dancing with the Stars, and was one of the returning celebrities in season 15. He was also a French co-host on the Netflix show Ultimate Beastmaster.

== Early life ==
Marini was born in Grasse, Alpes-Maritimes, France, to a Greek mother and Italian father. He worked as a baker in his father's bakery from the age of eight. After completing high school, he joined the French army and was stationed in Paris, where he served as a fireman in the Paris Fire Brigade. There, Marini met Fred Goudon, a photographer who introduced him to the world of modeling. After fulfilling his military duties in his early twenties, he went to the United States to learn English while working as a model. One of his first jobs was a television commercial for Bud Light beer. He made his acting debut at the age of 29, in the 2005 horror film Screech of the Decapitated.

== Career ==
Marini played Dante in Sex and the City: The Movie, and has appeared on Brothers & Sisters, Ugly Betty, Dirty Sexy Money, Criminal Minds, Nip/Tuck, The Bold and the Beautiful, Passions, and 2 Broke Girls. His film credits include One and the Other (L'Une et L'Autre) and The Boys & Girls Guide to Getting Down. On February 8, 2009, it was announced that Marini would participate in the eighth season of Dancing with the Stars. His professional partner was Cheryl Burke. He also took part in the fifteenth season of Dancing with the Stars for another chance to win the mirrorball trophy. He danced with season fourteen winner, Peta Murgatroyd. They were the eighth couple eliminated from the competition, alongside Kirstie Alley and Maksim Chmerkovskiy, on November 13, 2012.

In 2009, Marini was introduced as a recurring character on ABC's family drama Brothers & Sisters. He played Luc Laurent, the French love interest of Rachel Griffiths' character Sarah Walker, in what was slated to be a five-episode arc, but was promoted to series regular in 2010. Brothers & Sisters was cancelled by ABC in May 2011, after the fifth season ended. He also appeared as Bay Kennish's biological father, Angelo Sorrento, in Switched at Birth. On September 18, 2012, it was announced that he would become a series regular for the second season.

=== Dancing with the Stars ===
Marini and his professional partner Cheryl Burke came in as the runners-up of the eighth season of the American televised ballroom dancing competition Dancing with the Stars. On May 19, 2009, then-seventeen-year-old gymnast Shawn Johnson and her partner Mark Ballas were crowned champions of that season, defeating Marini and Burke by 1%. Marini returned alongside professional partner Peta Murgatroyd for the fifteenth season of Dancing with the Stars; the pair finished in sixth place.

Marini reunites with former ‘’Dancing with the Stars’’ alum Kym Herjavec in the 2025 Amazon Prime movie ‘’Christmas in the Ballroom’’.

== Filmography ==
=== Film ===
Year	Title	Role	Notes
2005	Screech of the Decapitated	Henri	Direct-to-video
2006	The Boys & Girls Guide to Getting Down	Attractive man in club	
2007	Stand Up	Photographer	
2007	L'Une et L'Autre	Gilles	Short film
2008	Sex and the City	Dante	
2012	Puss in Boots: The Three Diablos	Captain of the Guard, Paolo the Squire	Voice; short film
2012	Scruples	Renee Dufaux	Television film
2014	The List	Dr. Antonio Rosenblatt	
2014	The Last Rescue	Bruno Travert	
2017	All I Wish	Jean-Michel	
2020	Waiting for Anya	Jo's father	
2021	Venus as a Boy	Pierre	
2021	Burning at Both Ends	Inspector Gerald Rousseau	Entitled Resistance: 1942 in some territories
2024	Murder Company	Daquin, French Resistance	
2025	Christmas In The Ballroom	Will	Amazon Prime film
TBA	One Attempt Remaining †	TBA	Filming

=== Television ===
Year	Title	Role	Notes
2004	The O.C.	Lawyer	1 episode
2005, 2017	The Bold and the Beautiful	French waiter (2005)/Doctor (2017)	4 episodes
2006	Passions	Italian bicycle rider	Season 7, episode 213
2006	Criminal Minds	Curt	Episode: "The Fisher King: Part 1"
2006	Windfall	French man	Episode: "The Getaway"
2006	Ugly Betty	Jean-Luc	Episode: "Queens for a Day"
2007	The Bold and the Beautiful	Jean Claude	Season 21, episode 88
2007	Dirty Sexy Money	Italian designer	Episode: "The Lions"
2009–2011	Brothers & Sisters	Luc Laurent	Guest star: season 4; main cast: season 5; 30 episodes
2009	Nip/Tuck	Renaldo Panettiere	2 episodes
2011	Castle	Tobias Strange	Episode: "Poof! You're Dead"
2011	Royal Pains	Niko	Episode: "Listen to the Music"
2011–2017	Switched at Birth	Angelo Sorrento	Recurring: season 1; main cast: seasons 2–3; guest: s5; 54 episodes
2011	Modern Family	Julian	Episode: "Go Bullfrogs!"
2011–2012	Hot in Cleveland	Captain Lebeau	2 episodes
2012	Are You There, Chelsea?	Robert	Episode: "The Foodie"
2013–2014	2 Broke Girls	Nicolas Saintcroix	7 episodes
2013	Kirstie	Michel	Episode: "Pilot"
2014–2015	Devious Maids	Sebastien Dussault	Guest star: season 2; main cast: season 3; 12 episodes
2014	The McCarthys	Maurice	Episode: "Red Sox Swap"
2014	The Mysteries of Laura	Tom Birk	Episode: "The Mystery of the Red Runway"
2016	Teen Wolf	Sebastien Valet	Guest star; 3 episodes
2016	Daredevil	Jacques Duchamps	Episode: "The Man in The Box"
2016	Bones	The Marquis de Chaussin	Episode: "The Jewel in the Crown"
2017	The Bold and the Beautiful	Dr. Ghode	Guest star; 2 episodes
2018	Another Period	Juan Pablo del Castillo	Guest star; 1 episode
2018–2019	Days of Our Lives	Ted Laurent	42 episodes
2022	Dollface	Richard	Episode: "Space Cadet"
2022	The Rookie	Detective Olivier Marseille	Episode: "Real Crime" Season 4 Episode 16
2022	Uncoupled	Paolo	Episode: "Chapter 3"
2023	Grey's Anatomy	Michael	Episode: "Wedding Bell Blues"
2024	Crimes of Fashion: Killer Clutch	Andre Dubreuil	TV movie
2024	S.W.A.T.	Gus Dupont	Episode: "Vanished"
2024	Beyond Black Beauty	Cédric Dumont	
2025	Night Court	Rodrigo	season 3 episode 6 "The Jakeout"

Awards and achievements
Preceded by Warren Sapp & Kym Johnson	Dancing with the Stars (US) runner up Season 8 (Spring 2009 with Cheryl Burke)	Succeeded by Mýa & Dmitry Chaplin
