= Jenifer Rice-Genzuk Henry =

American screenwriter

Jenifer Rice-Genzuk
- Born: Jenifer Sara Rice-Genzuk California, United States
- Occupations: Producer, screenwriter, singer
- Years active: 1999–present
- Spouse: Jerome Henry

Jenifer Rice-Genzuk Henry, born as Jenifer Sara Rice-Genzuk and previously known as Jeni G., is an American screenwriter and former singer. She worked as an Executive Producer and co-showrunner on the Freeform series Grown-ish. Before her time as a screenwriter, she was a member of the American girl group Before Dark. She also served as a staff writer on MTV's Death Valley, an executive producer on BET's The Game and as a co-executive producer on the ABC series Black-ish .

== Education ==
In 2001, Rice-Genzuk Henry graduated from USC University of Southern California with a B.S. in Music Industry.

== Discography (with Before Dark) ==
=== Album ===
- 2000: Daydreamin'

=== Singles ===
Year	Song	Chart positions		
Year	Song	US Hot 100	US R&B	US Rhythmic
1999	"Baby"	—	48	—
1999	"Come Correct"	—	93	—
2000	"Monica"	77	41	22

== Filmography ==
=== The Game episodes ===
- "To Baby... Or Not To Baby" (2007)
- "Je-Rome Wasn't Built In A Day" (2008)
- "Take These Vows And Shove 'Em!" (2008)
- "The Platski Thickens" (2008)
- "Hill Street Blues" (2009)
- "A Very Special Episode" (2011)
- "Whip It, Whip It Good" (2011)
- "Keep Your Friends Close And Your Prostitute Closer" (2012)
- "A Punch In The Gut... Full Of Human" (2012)
- "Let Them Eat (Cup)Cake!" (2012)
- "Cold Swine Sucks... And So Does Falling In Love!" (2012)
- "How To Lose All Your Phat In One Day" (2013)
- "I Love Luke... Ahh!" (2013)
- "A Swan Song For Rick And Tasha" (2013)
- "He's A No-Good, Lyin', Cheatin', Honky-Tonk Man!" (2014)
- "The Pittsy Shuffle: Why Pitts Really Dripped" (2015)
- "Acting Class And Rebound Ass" (2015)
- "Hashtag My Bad" (2015)
- "Clip It... Clip It Good" (2015)

=== Death Valley episodes ===
- "Who, What, When, Werewolf... Why?" (2011)

=== Black-ish episodes ===
- "Jacked o' Lantern" (2015)
- "Good-ish Times" (2016)
- "Being Bow-Racial" (2016)
- "ToysRn'tUs" (2017)
- "Dog Eat Dog World" (2018)

=== Grown-ish episodes ===
- "Late Registration" (2018)
- "It's Hard Out There For A Pimp" (2018)
- "Crew Love" (2018)
- "Face the World" (2019)
- "Strictly 4 My..." (2019)
- "Dreams and Nightmares" (2019)
- "Age Ain't Nothing But A Number" (2020)
- "Know Yourself" (2021)
- "Who Do You Love?" (2021)
- "A BOY IS A GUN" (2021)
- "You Beat Me to the Punch" (2021)
