= Christmas at Water's Edge =

2004 film directed by Lee Davis

- Theatrical release poster
- Written by: Cleveland O'Neil III; Brian E. O'Neil
- Directed by: Lee Davis
- Starring: Keshia Knight Pulliam; Pooch Hall; Earl Billings; Ray J; Richard Lawson; Janet Hubert; Tom Bosley
- Country of origin: United States
- Original language: English

Production
- Running time: 87 minutes
- Budget: $450,000

Original release
- Release: December 4, 2004

Christmas at Water's Edge is a contemporary variation of A Christmas Carol, directed by Lee Davis, starring Keshia Knight Pulliam, Tom Bosley and Pooch Hall. It was shown in theaters in 2004 and released on DVD in 2007.

The film is about a wealthy collegian (Keshia Knight Pulliam) and an angel-in-training (Pooch Hall) who work together to organize a holiday concert for a youth center.

== Plot ==
An angel from above walks into Layla Turner's (Knight-Pulliam) life and shows her the true meaning of the holiday season. The angel's mission is to transform Layla's materialistic views about the occasion. The angel opened Layla's eyes, showing that there is more to Christmas than things money can buy.

== Cast ==
- Keshia Knight Pulliam as Leila Turner
- Pooch Hall as Tre
- Earl Billings as Earl
- Ray J as Alberto Turner
- Richard Lawson as Mr. Turner
- Janet Hubert as Mrs. Turner
- Tom Bosley as Harry
- Hayley Marie Norman as Gina
- Nadeen Gautier as Karissa
- Khanya Mkhize as Neecy
- Riley Weston as K.C.
- Giovonnie Samuels as April
- Chris Blasman as Frankie
- Darris Love as Bonz
- Cleveland O'Neal III as Joseph (credited as Cleveland O'Neal)
- Ivelka Reyes as Professor Tillman

== See also ==
- List of films about angels
- List of Christmas films
