= Murder Company =

American Second World War film (2024)

- Directed by: Shane Dax Taylor
- Written by: Jesse Mittelstadt
- Produced by: Ian Niles; Richard Switzer
- Starring: Joe Anderson; Kelsey Grammer; Pooch Hall; Gilles Marini; William Moseley; Jilon VanOver
- Release date: July 5, 2024
- Running time: 86 minutes
- Country: United States
- Language: English

Murder Company is a 2024 Alternate History action war film about American paratroopers in alternate version of World War II on a secret mission in Normandy to rescue a French Resistance operative from German capture, then to smuggle him behind enemy lines to kill a Nazi general.

== Plot ==
Two days before the Normandy invasion, paratrooper Jim Southern is hanging upside down on a tree in the middle of a forest where gunfire was being held. He manages to free himself, remove his parachute gear, and grab his M3 grease gun, where he takes cover behind a tree. As Southern stealthily moves through the trees, a soldier sneaks behind him and points his gun behind him. However, it was another paratrooper named William Cerino (nicknamed "Cooledge" who was a black paratrooper who was a former smokejumper of the 555th Parachute Infantry Battalion "Triple Nickels" and folded to the 82nd Airborne Division as a radioman). He was friends with Southern and the two including a paratrooper named Tally was searching for Colonel Redding. The three found the colonel dangling dead, Tally was searching the body for information before they got ambushed by a German patrol which killed Tally. The two remaining paratroopers continued their walk in the forest, the two heard something big from their position and decided to plant mines and took cover. They suddenly spotted a flak wagon. As the two are about to fire on the truck, a big explosion occurs which exploded in flames, revealing three paratroopers that started the ambush led by Lieutenant Dean Smith along with private Stu Boards and Medic Miller. The group eventually found a camp zone where this company of the 82nd is located. Smith and Southern met General Haskel who has been torturing Nazi’s on where he informs the two that they drop was almost north of Amfreville and the 82nd plan had fallen to pieces. Haskel further explains that the Germans dammed the rivers, blocking our routes inward flooding half of France, which the Allies had anticipated when the pathfinders and aerial reconnaissance. The pathfinders were able to up the beacons, but the pilots were left not knowing where the drop zones were. This causes the 82nd Airborne be on the wrong side of the Merdert and cut off from the evasion. So Haskel told the two men that they will not return to their units and was given a mission from Allied intelligence about a maquis fighters being held captive by the Nazi’s. One of them has intel on a Nazi SS officer that the Allies want to take out. After the group killed a squad of Nazi soldiers and secured the village of La Fiere. They stumbled upon a resistance member named Jean Daquin. Smith has a conversation with Haskel about a Nazi Office Name Ramsy who is the highest-ranking SS officer who is currently in the field.

If the squad can kill him, they will buy the allied forces enough time to get forces off the beaches. So, Jean joins the squad just in time to witness a group of paratroopers being ambushed by a Nazi patrol. Smith refuses Jean to fight because he is there for the ride. As the firefight continues, Stubbs successfully drags a wounded paratrooper to cover while Jean flanks around and shoots a Nazi who almost kills Southern. After the firefight dies down, an enraged Smith confronts Jean and scolds him saying that if he marches with them, he has to follow orders. Several hours later, the group are taking a breather and discussing Jean. Smith says that their job is to get that man as far as Bastogne but he keeps trying to get himself killed. However, Coolidge and Stubbs praised the Frenchman for saving their asses. The next morning, Haskel is informed that the ridgeway is pulling back and that they don't have the manpower to hold the town. If they don’t stop the Nazis, Rommel and the 21st will move right down to the beach and kick them all back to England. The group soon walked down a road, Miller informs Smith that they spotted an American patrol with German prisoners. Coolidge tries to get on the radio he was given, but couldn’t get a signal, so he was given permission to get a signal to get a signal to go up on a hill with miller to assist. Southern and Stubbs flanked right to an embankment and Jean was given permission to go up a hill to get a bright eyes view. As everybody is moving in position. Coolidge hears movement coming behind him and turns around and gets suddenly shot in the head. Luckily, he was survived by a bullet ricochet, the group instantly realized that the paratrooper patrols were Nazi’s in disguise and opened fire. Smith is instantly killed in the fire fight and the group quickly collect his dog tags and bury him.

Meanwhile, Haskel realized that they sent the squad to the teeth toward a Nazi Counter offensive and lost contact with them. So, in a last-ditch effort, Haskel assembled the remaining company of 82nd paratroopers to hold the line on the bridge. The group gets into an argument about the war and Hitler. Jean opens up about Ramsey and said when the Germans invaded, he came to Jeans town saying all he wanted was peace, giving the French amnesty in exchange for the resistance and Jean wanted to trust in him but he ends up firing Jean's house and killed both his wife and daughter in front of his eyes doing nothing to stop it. Miller said he will take first watch. During the night, Miller gets killed by three German soldiers. This causes the group to wake up and engage in hand-to-hand fight. They manage to kill the three soldiers leaving the group to mourn Miller corpse. Haskel and his company are ready to the counterattack and to make sure to make every shoot count. Southern, Coolidge, Stubbs and jean are walking to the woods to find the base. Coolidge is starting to have second thoughts and argue with Southern and saying this whole mission personal which Stubbs argue that this mission is personnel with him as will. Coolidge reminds him about his family, but Stubbs shuts him down. Coolidge desperately begs Jean about they are walking into. He tells them that this panzer division are veterans from the eastern front and nickname themselves and the "Murder Division". With no other options, the groups have to finish their mission. Coolidge hesitated in the moment but decide to join them.

The men finally found there target revealing that the headquarters of the 12th SS Panzer Division "Hitlerjugend in a house. Southern decided to group. Stubbs will flank to the right, Jean will have a birds eye a provide covering fire for the paratroopers and he and Coolidge will plan explosives on the nearby ammunitions and trucks. Everything went plan before Ramsey spots the paratroopers killing his men and orders his lieutenants to send in reinforcements resulted with the group being low of ammo and advantage. Stubbs gets shot in the leg, a Nazi got his on the steering wheel of a truck that Coolidge had planted that almost run him over before the truck explodes, sending him flying and shrapnel hitting Ramsey's face in a near by window but survived. Southern manages to get Coolidge to regain consciousness but was badly injured. Stubbs tells Southern that he will watch over him, so Jean and Southern enters the building killing any Nazi encounter. Ramsey and Jean get into a intense fighting with Ramsey getting the upper hand almost killing Jean before Southern shoots him. Ramsey begs for mercy and tells him that he will give them information. The two were not having and Jean shoots Ramsey in the head killing instantly and saved the captured paratroopers in the basement of the Nazi building. Haskel and his company had eventually managed to hold to make access to one of the beaches that allied forces managed to take one of the original sectors despite the invasion ended both as a success and a complete disaster. The three remaining paratroopers exhausted took a breather sitting on a bench and drinking. Jean with his vendetta complete heads home saying goodbye to the paratroopers before vanishing to the woods. Jim says to Stubbs and Coolidge that the war is just getting started from them.

== Cast ==
- William Moseley as Sergeant Jim Southern
- Joe Anderson as 2nd Lieutenant Dean Smith
- Kelsey Grammer as Major General Haskel
- Pooch Hall as Technician Fifth Grade William "Coolidge" Cerino
- Gilles Marini as Jean Daquin
- Jilon VanOver as Private First Class Stu "Stubbs" Boards
- Ian Niles as Private First Class Miller
- Roman Schomburg as SS-Gruppenführer Erik Ramsey
- James Wiles as Sergeant Verrill
- Nathan Cooper as Private First Class Tally
