= Pooch Hall =

American actor

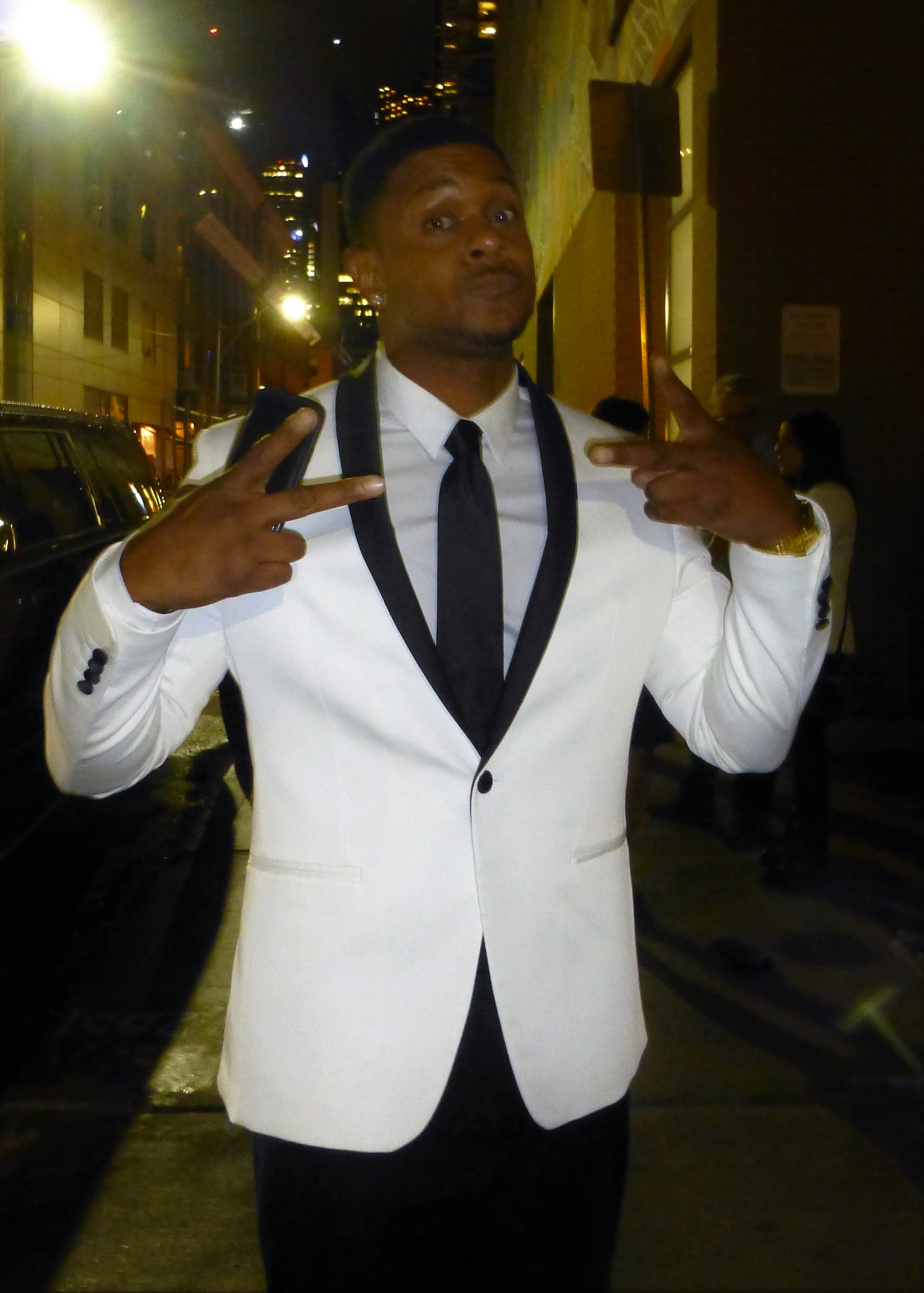
- Hall at the 2016 Toronto Film Festival
- Born: Marion H. Hall, Jr. February 8, 1976 (age 50); Brockton, Massachusetts, U.S.
- Occupations: Actor, model
- Years active: 1990–present
- Spouse: Linda Hall (m. 1997)
- Children: 4

Marion "Pooch" Hall Jr. (born February 8, 1976) is an American television and film actor known for his role as Derwin Davis, the football player on the sitcom The Game, and as Ricky in the 2011 film Jumping the Broom. He also played the character of Daryll Donovan in the Showtime drama Ray Donovan.

Hall portrayed Muhammad Ali in the 2016 sports biography film Chuck, about Ali's opponent Chuck Wepner and the Ali–Wepner 1975 world heavyweight title boxing bout.

== Early life ==
Marion H. Hall Jr. is the son of Marion and Cindy Hall. He was born in Brockton, Massachusetts and attended Brockton High School. In 1994, he won the Southern New England Golden Gloves for boxing. Hall attended the University of Massachusetts Dartmouth where he first began acting with the UMass Dartmouth Theatre Company.

== Career ==
Hall started his career doing commercials and modeling. Hall landed his first acting role in the 2001 Lift. That same year, he appeared in Blue Hill Avenue. In 2003, he served as co-host for The N reality series Girls v. Boys. In 2005, he portrayed Ty'ree in the miniseries Miracle's Boys. The following year, he won the role of Derwin Davis on The Game. He was featured as Chrisette Michele's love interest in her music video "What You Do".

Hall had a recurring role on the CBS sitcom Accidentally on Purpose during its 2009–2010 season. He replaced Cory Hardrict (the husband of Tia Mowry, his co-star from The Game). In an interview on The Tom Joyner Morning Show, Hall clarified details about his departure from the series The Game. "My contract came up, I promise you. We negotiated, and we couldn't come up with a number. So my team said we're going to send you out [to auditions]". Hall said the Showtime series Ray Donovan knew about his commitment to BET, but it took so long to respond to his agents; however, he continued to move forward with his new projects. "I never did quit the show," Hall said. "When The Game got canceled, I was offered another job and I booked Ray Donovan the next day." Hall made a guest appearance for the sixth season in one episode "The Blueprint" and in the series finale.

On September 18, 2015, he was cast in A Dog's Purpose.

== Personal life ==
Hall met his wife Linda in 1996 when she was a freshman in college. They married in 1999. They have four children.

== Filmography ==
=== Film ===
Year	Title	Role	Notes
2001	Lift	Derek	
2001	Blue Hill Avenue	Billy "Schlep Rock" Brown	
2001	Bad Light	Manny	Short
2003	A Tale of Two Pizzas	Eugene	
2003	Scratch	Jay	Short
2004	Black Cloud	Rocket Ray Tracey	
2004	Beacon Hill	Michael Cannon	
2004	Christmas at Water's Edge	Tre	TV movie
2005	The Food Chain: A Hollywood Scarytale	Chad Prater	Short
2006	Hood of Horror	Sod	
2006	Blind Dating	Jay	
2008	Courtroom K	Orangelo Tell	TV movie
2009	Xtra Credit	Shawn Hadley	TV movie
2010	Stomp the Yard: Homecoming	Dane	
2011	Jumping the Broom	Ricky	
2013	Live at the Foxes Den	Gary Previn	
2015	Carter High	Coach Vonner	
2015	My First Love	Omar	Video
2016	Chuck	Muhammad Ali	
2016	Mango & Guava	Coach	Short
2017	A Dog's Purpose	Al	
2017	But Deliver Us from Evil	Pete Johnson	
2017	The Runner	Terrence Lowe	
2019	All the Way with You	Keith	
2021	Cherry	Sgt. Whomever	
2022	Ray Donovan: The Movie	Daryll Donovan	
2023	A Nashville Legacy	Damien	TV movie
2023	Alarmed	Sean Davidson	
2024	Murder Company	Coolidge	

=== Television ===
Year	Title	Role	Notes
2004	The Division	D.J.	Episode: "Play Ball"
2004	Without a Trace	Lionel	Episode: "The Season"
2005	Miracle's Boys	Tyree	Main cast
2006	Heist	Lucas	Episode: "Strife"
2006	Pepper Dennis	Garfield	Recurring role
2006–15	The Game	Derwin Davis	Main role: Seasons 1–5, guest: Seasons 6 & 9.
2007	Girlfriends	Derwin Davis	Episode: "It's Been Determined"
2009–10	Accidentally on Purpose	Ryan	Recurring role
2011–16	Suits	Jimmy Kirkwood	Recurring role: Seasons 1–5
2012	Royal Pains	JJ Small	Episode: "Business & Pleasure"
2012	Warehouse 13	Cody Bell	Episode: "Second Chance"
2013	How to Live with Your Parents	Ryan	Episode: "How to Fix Up Your Ex"
2013	Necessary Roughness	Blake Bridges	Episode: "Sucker Punch"
2013–20	Ray Donovan	Daryll Donovan	Main role
2016	Hell's Kitchen	Himself	Guest diner; Episode: "Surf Riding & Turf Fighting"
2017	Criminal Minds	FBI Trainee Clark	Episode: "Profiling 202"
2018	Unsolved	Frank Alexander	Episode: "Nobody Talks"
2021	The Game	Derwin Davis	Recurring role
2022–2023	Law & Order: Organized Crime	Dante Scott	Season 3
2022	I Got a Story to Tell	Charles	Episode: "The Following of Angela Whitaker"
2025	The Family Business: New Orleans	Floyd	Series regular
2026	The Real Housewives of Atlanta	Himself	Episode: "Halloween Hot Pocket"
