= List of The Game episodes =

This is a list of episodes for the American comedy-drama The Game.

== Series overview ==
Season	Episodes	Originally released		
Season	Episodes	First released	Last released	Network
Backdoor pilot		April 17, 2006		UPN
1	22	October 1, 2006	May 14, 2007	The CW
2	20	October 1, 2007	May 18, 2008	The CW
3	22	October 3, 2008	May 15, 2009	The CW
4	13	January 11, 2011	March 29, 2011	BET
5	22	January 10, 2012	June 5, 2012	BET
6	20	March 26, 2013	September 3, 2013	BET
7	10	March 4, 2014	April 29, 2014	BET
8	8	January 14, 2015	March 4, 2015	BET
9	10	June 3, 2015	August 5, 2015	BET

== Episodes ==
=== Backdoor pilot (2006) ===
No. overall	No. in season	Title	Directed by	Written by	Original release date	US viewers (millions)
133	18	"The Game"	Salim Akil	Mara Brock Akil	April 17, 2006	3.54
Joan Clayton (Tracee Ellis Ross) tries to persuade her cousin, Melanie Barnett (Tia Mowry), an aspiring med student, to pursue her career in medical school instead of putting her life on hold for her boyfriend (Aldis Hodge) and waiting for his career to kick off. Notes: Hodge is replaced by Pooch Hall in the seasons to follow. Jennifer Baxter is replaced by Brittany Daniel as Kelly Pitts. This episode served as the backdoor pilot episode for the Girlfriends-spinoff, The Game.

=== Season 1 (2006–07) ===
No. overall	No. in season	Title	Directed by	Written by	Original release date	US viewers (millions)
1	1	"Away Game"	Ted Wass	Anne Flett-Giordano & Chuck Ranberg	October 1, 2006	2.60
In the series premiere, Derwin invites Melanie to his first away game in Miami, but due to her heavy school load, she decides to pass. When Tasha and Kelly find out she is not going, they persuade her to change her mind by telling her away games are a playground for cheating. Meanwhile, Derwin's teammates are upset that he invited Melanie and tell him he needs to un-invite her, fearing the other wives will use her as a spy.
2	2	"The Rules of the Game"	Salim Akil	Mara Brock Akil	October 8, 2006	2.69
As a favor to Derwin, Melanie attends the first Saber Sunbeam meeting of the season, only to learn that unlike the wives, football players "girlfriends" are not considered legitimate and are treated as such by the other wives. On the same day, Derwin attends his first rookie seminar where he is given a lecture about gold diggers, STDs and is hazed by the other players. Later that night, Melanie and Derwin attend a party where Melanie learns the rules of the game.
3	3	"Gifted"	Arlene Sanford	Julie Bean	October 16, 2006	2.65
When Melanie sends gifts to the football team on behalf of Derwin in honor of the first game, Derwin gets teased and his teammates Jason and Malik feel pressured to reciprocate. A gift giving competition ensues. Melanie sees the loyalty that Tasha and Kelly have to offer after her friend abandons her for Malik. (Guest Star: Caryn Ward as Erica Harrison)
4	4	"How Tasha Got Her Groove Back"	Salim Akil	Sara V. Finney	October 23, 2006	2.48
When Malik begins to have obvious disagreements with the Sabers' offensive coordinator, Kenny (guest star Rocky Carroll), he enlists the aid of his mother, Tasha. Sparks fly between the two, however, despite their different outlooks on where Malik's career should go.
5	5	"Brittany's Super Sweet Sixth"	Arlene Sanford	Erica Montolfo	October 30, 2006	2.85
When Kelly's daughter (guest star Erica Gluck) tells her she wants an extravagant birthday party like the rest of her friends, Kelly approaches Jason for money and he refuses. Meanwhile, when Derwin beats Malik in an Xbox John Madden game, Malik takes the loss badly and repeatedly comes to Derwin for a re-match to redeem himself. Features Malik's first reference to Derwin's girlfriend as "Girl Melanie." Guest stars: Barry Floyd as Terrance "Tee Tee" Carter Note: This episodes marks the first appearance of Barry Floyd as Terrance "Tee Tee" Carter
6	6	"Rift and Separate"	Salim Akil	Tim Edwards	November 6, 2006	2.86
A minor argument escalates into a major locker room rift between Jason and Malik that affects their playing relationship on the field. The locker room tension spills over to Kelly and Tasha, leaving Melanie in the middle and in an awkward position when she insists that they all come to her house for a dinner party.
7	7	"Mi Casa Es Su Casa"	Salim Akil	Kenya Barris	November 13, 2006	2.43
After Tasha embarrasses Malik when he throws a house party, Malik feels disrespected and throws Tasha out. Meanwhile, Tasha and Kenny argue over their relationship's secrecy, leaving Tasha to feel that she uses Malik to interfere with her personal life. Too Short guest stars Guest stars: Barry Floyd as Terrance "Tee Tee" Carter, Too Short as himself.
8	8	"The Trey Wiggs Episode"	Ken Whittingham	Kenny Smith	November 20, 2006	2.42
When Derwin's image consultant (guest star Shanti Lowry), tells Derwin her idea to pair him with football player Trey Wiggs (guest star Chaz Lamar Shepherd), his former college teammate, he objects, saying he and Trey were more like rivals than teammates. Meanwhile, Derwin learns that Melanie had lunch with Trey, though she insists that it is strictly platonic. However when a local paper secretly photographs Melanie having a second lunch with Trey, things heat up.
9	9	"The Trey Wiggs Fallout Episode"	Leonard R. Garner Jr.	Kenny Smith	November 27, 2006	2.83
When Melanie realizes that Derwin is still upset about the bad publicity caused by her continuing friendship with an old football rival, she tries to find a provocative way to make it up to him. However, when Derwin refuses to acknowledge that there is a problem, Melanie calls her mother and starts packing her things. Meanwhile, Kelly and Tasha persuade Malik and Jason to talk some sense into Derwin.
10	10	"There's No Place Like Home"	Leonard R. Garner Jr.	Kenya Barris	December 11, 2006	2.71
With Christmas approaching, the Sabers lose their final game and Melanie looks forward to going home to see her family and spending some quality time with Derwin. However, the Sabers soon discover they still have a chance at the playoffs, and Derwin asks Melanie to stay in town. When Melanie finds out the Sabers family is not interested in the holiday spirit, she decides to go home and spend the holidays with her family. Guest Star: Tahj Mowry Guest stars: Barry Floyd as Terrance "Tee Tee" Carter, Tahj Mowry as Cameron
11	11	"It's Hard Being Kelly Pitts"	Sheldon Epps	Erica Montolfo	January 22, 2007	2.25
When Kelly attempts to please Jason, take care of her daughter and impress Jason's parents who visit from out of town, she overworks herself and has a breakdown. Meanwhile, Malik starts to worry about winning the playoff game and enlists Derwin as his new practice partner.
12	12	"To Baby...Or Not to Baby"	Sheldon Epps	Jenifer Rice-Genzuk	January 29, 2007	2.27
Melanie and Derwin discover that Melanie might be pregnant. Melanie realizes she is not ready for parenthood and puts off taking the pregnancy test. Excited about the possibility of a baby, Derwin plans to surprise Melanie with a half-time proposal during the game, but Melanie tries to stop him when she discovers she is not pregnant. Derwin proposes anyway and Melanie accepts, feeling pressured on national television.
13	13	"The Iceman Cometh"	Arlene Sanford	Tim Edwards	February 5, 2007	2.63
Although the Sabers lose their game and are eliminated from the playoffs, Derwin's performance earns him the attention of a high-profile manager. Melanie is shocked when Derwin considers a proposal that he be traded to a team in Chicago. Meanwhile, Malik, taking the game loss really hard, decides to write a rap to vent his feelings, and Kelly and Jason try to hide their feelings about losing the game. Guest stars: Barry Floyd as Terrance "Tee Tee" Carter
14	14	"Pro Bowl Blues"	Salim Akil	Chuck Ranberg & Anne Flett-Giordano	February 12, 2007	2.52
When Jason doesn't get selected for the Pro Bowl game, he begins to question his future and starts planning for retirement. Meanwhile, Malik is selected for the Pro Bowl once again, but decides not to take Tasha with him to Hawaii, fearing she will embarrass him by trying to scout new clients. Guest stars: Barry Floyd as Terrance "Tee Tee" Carter
15	15	"Out of Bounds"	Salim Akil	Hale Rothstein	February 19, 2007	2.28
When Malik finds out that the love of his life, model/actress Eva Marcelle (guest starring as herself) is getting married, he decides to use up-and-coming singer Drew Sidora (guest starring as herself) to make Eva jealous. Learning that she has been used, Drew turns to Derwin as a shoulder to cry on. Later, Drew asks Derwin to be in her new music video and their on-screen kiss leads to more than he anticipated. Guest stars: Barry Floyd as Terrance "Tee Tee" Carter
16	16	"Baby B.S."	Salim Akil	Julie Bean	February 26, 2007	2.47
Kelly is happy when she finds out Jason wants to have another baby. But when Tasha offers her a job at her management firm, Kelly has a quick change of heart. Meanwhile, when R&B singer Drew Sidora starts calling Derwin on a consistent basis, he realizes their recent flirtation has gone a step too far. Guest stars: Barry Floyd as Terrance "Tee Tee" Carter
17	17	"God Bless the Girl That's Got Her Own"	Chuck Ranberg	Chuck Ranberg & Anne Flett-Giordano	March 19, 2007	2.14
When Melanie gives temporary shelter to a Sunbeam whose boyfriend has left her high and dry, Melanie begins to feel uncomfortable about being completely dependent on Derwin for financial security.
18	18	"You Say You Want a Revolution"	Vito Giambalvo	Tim Edwards	March 26, 2007	2.37
When Camille (guest star Jolie Jenkins), the wife of the newest star Saber, joins the Sunbeams, she decides to run against Kelly for president. Kelly expects Tasha to vote for her, however Tasha would rather have Kelly devote her full time to being her assistant. Meanwhile, Malik, Jason and Derwin have trouble getting along with the new Saber defensive star Ty. Guest star: Nick Von Esmarch
19	19	"The Big Chill"	Salim Akil	Sara V. Finney	April 23, 2007	2.55
Tasha's boyfriend Kenny (guest star Rocky Carroll) confronts her about her aggressive attitude, and asks her to tone it down when he introduces her to his group of friends. Later, during a gathering with Kenny's friends, a comment made about Tasha sends her off the deep end. Meanwhile, one of Melanie's late-night study sessions causes problems with Derwin.
20	20	"The Many Lies of Derwin Davis"	Salim Akil	Kenny Smith	April 30, 2007	2.41
When Derwin is unexpectedly forced to take Melanie to singer Drew Sidora's (guest starring as herself) video release party, he panics over how the meeting between them is going to turn out. Kelly and Tasha continue to grow in their work relationship, while Tasha has trouble finding new clients. Meanwhile Jason struggles with his new parenting responsibilities.
21	21	"When the Chickens Come Home to Roost, Part 1"	Salim Akil	Salim Akil & Mara Brock Akil	May 14, 2007	2.51
In part 1 in the two-part first season finale, during ESPY week in Los Angeles, Derwin gets an unexpected endorsement deal and is left to celebrate with Drew Sidora (guest starring as herself), while Melanie is busy studying in San Diego. Malik runs into Renee (guest star Kendra C. Johnson) an old flame, but when things heat up and she wants to spend time with him in public, he gets cold feet because she is overweight. Feeling conflicted, Malik asks Tasha for advice to sort out his feelings about Renee.
22	22	"When the Chickens Come Home to Roost, Part 2"	Salim Akil	Mara Brock Akil & Salim Akil	May 14, 2007	2.51
In the conclusion of the first-season finale, Melanie and Derwin have a heated argument about their impending engagement status. Derwin sleeps with Drew, then confesses to Jason & says he must inform Melanie, which he goes back to San Diego & does. Melanie is outraged at first, but forgives Derwin after he claims they just kissed. Meanwhile, Jason gets a reality check when he is asked to speak on camera and conduct special interviews for ESPN. Later, Kelly helps Tasha get new clients by using an unusual sales technique. In the last scene, we see Melanie over-hearing Dionne telling Derwin that she knows about him sleeping with Drew Sidora. Melanie takes off the ring before getting in the elevator as she tells him it's over, leaving Derwin heartbroken.

=== Season 2 (2007–08) ===
No. overall	No. in season	Title	Directed by	Written by	Original release date	US viewers (millions)
23	1	"Diary of a Mad Black Woman, Redux"	Salim Akil	Mara Brock Akil	October 1, 2007	2.98
Season 2 opens with Derwin trying to repair his relationship with Melanie after his infidelity with Drew Sidora. The two have a huge fight outside the hotel. But when Melanie shows up with Trey Wiggs (guest star Chaz Lamar Shepherd and Kadiatou Fofana) to collect her stuff and move out for good, Derwin gets upset. Meanwhile, Malik's on-air kiss with Renee starts a frenzy of plus-sized women throwing themselves at him. Guest stars: Barry Floyd as Terrance "Tee Tee" Carter
24	2	"The Trey Wiggs Taps Back Episode"	Salim Akil	Kenny Smith	October 8, 2007	2.86
Homeless, heartbroken, and distraught, Melanie turns to Derwin's rival, Trey Wiggs, for comfort. Trey offers Melanie financial assistance, and after a brief embrace she sleeps with him. After the encounter, Melanie is confused on whether or not to accept his offer of a fully furnished condo and new SUV. Meanwhile, Jason butts heads with the new coach (Lee Majors) when the Sabers football team is sold to new owners, and doesn't have a good showing at practice.
25	3	"Tasha, Renee and Malik the Cliche"	Salim Akil	Julie Bean	October 15, 2007	2.68
When Renee is unable to engage in romantic rendezvous with Malik after he invites her over and she learns that he lives with his mother; it prompts Malik to ask Melanie for advice, and eventually explain to Tasha that they need alternate their living arrangements. Meanwhile, Jason makes a far-out attempt to make peace with his new coach by hosting bible study for the team at his house. Guest stars: Barry Floyd as Terrance "Tee Tee" Carter
26	4	"Hit Me with Your Best Shot"	Salim Akil	Elaine Aronson	October 22, 2007	2.61
Kelly convinces Jason to let her brother Brandon, recently out of rehab, stay with them. Later, Brandon catches Jason using steroids and promises to keep Jason's secret but when Kelly finds a syringe in the trash, she automatically suspects Brandon is back to his old ways and kicks him out of their home. Scott Michael Foster guest stars.
27	5	"Fool Me Twice... I'm the Damn Fool"	Salim Akil	Kenya Barris	October 29, 2007	2.42
After Melanie agrees to go out to dinner with Derwin, things take a turn for the worse when Melanie sees Drew kiss Derwin at the Music Video Awards. Melanie is distraught, but Malik encourages her to go on the date. Derwin decides to plan a surprise proposal with the help of R&B singer Musiq Soulchild, but Melanie believes he is still with Drew after Drew texts him. Assuming that she has been fooled again by Derwin, an intoxicated Melanie decides to get payback and tries to sleep with Malik. Guest stars: Barry Floyd as Terrance "Tee Tee" Carter
28	6	"Parental Guidance Suggested"	Salim Akil	Tim Edwards	November 5, 2007	2.26
Melanie makes Derwin think she slept with Malik, causing problems between those two; Tasha at first informs Melanie she has one month to find a new place to live, but forces her out after the incident. Elsewhere, Jason's steroid use causes trouble in the bedroom, and in his relationship. Guest stars: Barry Floyd as Terrance "Tee Tee" Carter
29	7	"Media Blitz"	Salim Akil	Hale Rothstein	November 12, 2007	2.55
Malik confronts a cartoonist for ridiculing him in a comic strip. Elsewhere, Kelly threatens to leave Jason for someone who will appreciate her; and Tasha meditates with a top football player in an effort to sign him to her agency. Guest stars: Barry Floyd as Terrance "Tee Tee" Carter, Lil' Kim as herself
30	8	"The Truth Hurts"	Salim Akil	Sara Finney-Johnson	November 19, 2007	2.35
Malik fires Tasha as his manager after her failed attempt to resolve the embarrassing situation he was involved in. Elsewhere, Jason worries his career may be over when he is selected for a random drug test for steroids; and a rival sports manager offers to buy Tasha's agency. Guest stars: Barry Floyd as Terrance "Tee Tee" Carter
31	9	"Turkey Basting Bitches"	Salim Akil	Erica D. Montolfo	November 26, 2007	2.80
Melanie is shocked when Derwin brings a new girlfriend to the diner where she is working. Later, Melanie discovers the woman is planning to get pregnant by stealing his sperm and impregnating herself using a turkey baster. She shares it with Derwin, but he doesn't believe her, only to later find out she was right.
32	10	"The Ghost of Derwin Past"	Salim Akil	Erica D. Montolfo	December 10, 2007	2.42
Melanie stays in San Diego to spend the holidays with Dionne after learning that she's all alone, but when Dionne resurrects an ad deal with Derwin, she abandons Melanie to go to St. Barts with him and some ad execs, all before Derwin abandons Dionne. Guest stars: Barry Floyd as Terrance "Tee Tee" Carter
33	11	"Je-Rome Wasn't Built in a Day"	Salim Akil	Jenifer Rice-Genzuk	February 4, 2008	2.11
Melanie starts dating a new guy and he takes her to a Sabers game, not knowing that she used to date Derwin; Melanie doesn't know the guy is just using her to land a deal with his company, and make him look good. Tasha tries to land an endorsement deal for Malik to get him back as a client, but it backfires. Kelly sees an open opportunity and Jason gets picked for the endorsement deal.
34	12	"Take These Vows and Shove 'Em"	Salim Akil	Jenifer Rice-Genzuk	March 23, 2008	1.26
Kelly takes Brittany and leaves Jason when he refuses to stop taking steroids. After a talk with Tasha, Jason realizes the sacrifices he needs to make & asks Kelly back, but not before she tells him they need to go to therapy; Derwin tries to impress a pretty woman but she sees through his facade. Guest stars: Barry Floyd as Terrance "Tee Tee" Carter
35	13	"The List Episode"	Salim Akil	Kenny Smith	March 30, 2008	1.50
Malik is set up on a date with a mean tennis pro (Serena Williams). While Malik tries to control her, Tasha attempts to sign her as a client; Kelly sets Melanie up on a date with Chad Johnson; Derwin starts dating a woman he met at Malik's party. (Guest star Gabrielle Dennis). Guest stars: Barry Floyd as Terrance "Tee Tee" Carter. Gabrielle Dennis as Janay Note: This episode marks the first appearance of Gabrielle Dennis as Janay Brice.
36	14	"White Men Can't Jump, But They're Definitely Packing"	Salim Akil	Sara Finney-Johnson	April 6, 2008	1.26
Tasha goes out drinking with her new coworkers and is insulted when one of the managers flashes her; Kelly and Jason see a marriage counselor, but the therapist is a huge fan of Jason's, who uses his charm to make the therapist see things his way; Derwin's teammates trick him into getting a tattoo, much to his displeasure.
37	15	"The Commitments"	Lenny Garner	Julie Bean	April 13, 2008	1.55
Melanie pulls back when her relationship with Jerome starts to heat up, but she changes her mind when she discovers that Derwin's new girlfriend has moved in with him. She cuts a chunk of her hair in a fit of panic before Tasha scolds her and Kelly. Elsewhere, Jason learns he is going to be benched for the next game due to his recent poor performance on the field.
38	16	"Bury My Heart at Wounded Knee"	Lenny Garner	Tim Edward Rhoze	April 20, 2008	1.46
When Derwin suffers a devastating injury in a big playoff game, Jason has to step in and fill his shoes for the Super Bowl, but he has conflicted feelings about the situation. Meanwhile, after a heated, passionate kiss with Derwin, Melanie feels torn between Derwin and Jerome, and Derwin also has conflicting feelings with Melanie and Janay. Derwin watches while the Sabers win the Super Bowl.
39	17	"Before the Parade Passes By"	Lenny Garner	Elaine Aronson	April 27, 2008	1.58
Melanie tries to convince Derwin to attend a victory parade for the Sabers. He reluctantly agrees but ends up running into Janay (guest star Gabrielle Dennis), who decides to put his feelings for Melanie to the test. Meanwhile, Jason is upset that he hasn't received a contract.
40	18	"The Lord Giveth and the Lord Taketh Away"	Lenny Garner	Kenya Barris	May 4, 2008	1.45
Malik begins dating Robin Givens (guest starring as herself) and soon realizes that his methods to dating may have been working against him. Meanwhile, Jason suffers from depression after the championship. Guest stars: Barry Floyd as Terrance "Tee Tee" Carter
41	19	"I Got 99 Problems and My Chick is One"	Salim Akil	Hale Rothstein	May 11, 2008	1.58
After Melanie accepts a gift from Derwin, Jerome (Mehcad Brooks) begins to question her commitment to their relationship. Melanie tries to throw his questioning by planning a romantic get away trip in Los Angeles but her plans go awry once she realizes that the Sabers are celebrating in the same hotel that they are staying in. Derwin and Malik commiserate over losing Melanie and Robin Givens respectively. Tasha gets upset when she learns that Rick Fox (guest starring as himself) is being promoted to manager and she ends up sharing an intimate moment with him. Meanwhile, after firing his manager, Kelly tries to convince Jason to sign with Irv. Guest stars: Barry Floyd as Terrance "Tee Tee" Carter, Mehcad Brooks as Jerome, Rick Fox as himself
42	20	"Baby Come Back"	Salim Akil	Mara Brock Akil	May 18, 2008	1.66
The new general manager of the Sabers seems more interested in getting to know Kelly than making a new deal with Jason. Kelly realizes that her marriage to Jason cannot be saved. After tracking down Melanie to confess his love for her, Derwin ends up in a fight with Jerome. Malik also confesses his love for Robin Givens, who reveals she doesn't like him back. Melanie confesses to Jerome that she's still in love with Derwin. Derwin finds out that his ex-girlfriend Janay is supposedly pregnant with his child, and Melanie is seen standing outside his door. Guest stars: Barry Floyd as Terrance "Tee Tee" Carter

=== Season 3 (2008–09) ===
No. overall	No. in season	Title	Directed by	Written by	Original release date	US viewers (millions)
43	1	"Baby on Board"	Salim Akil	Mara Brock Akil	October 3, 2008	1.95
Season 3 begins, after Melanie confesses to Derwin that she is still in love with him, Derwin shocks her with the news that Janay might be pregnant with his child. Kelly enlists help from her obnoxious parents, Bren and Nick (guest stars Lee Garlington and Don McManus), to keep Jason out of her life. Meanwhile, Malik is freaked out about his mom finding out that he married Robin Givens. Rudy Gay guest stars. Guest stars: Barry Floyd as Terrance "Tee Tee" Carter
44	2	"Mel-odrama"	Salim Akil	Mara Brock Akil	October 10, 2008	1.81
Suspecting foul play, Melanie decides to confront Janay and figure out whether she's really pregnant with Derwin's baby. Kelly, who is still trying to come to terms with her separation from Jason, plans a girls' night out with Tasha and Melanie. Tasha finally tracks down Malik and he is finally forced to confess his big news to his mother.
45	3	"Just When I Thought I Was Out...She Pulls Me Back In"	Salim Akil	Hale Rothstein	October 17, 2008	1.81
Although Rick Fox is crazy about Tasha and more than ready to go public with their new romance, Tasha borderlines on obsessive in her attempt to keep their relationship a secret from their co-workers. Malik begins to realize that his marriage may never have a happy-ever-after when Robin Givens seems more intent on getting publicity for their celebrity marriage than on spending time together as newlyweds. Melanie and Derwin try to resume their sex life, but Derwin's stress about becoming a father may prove to be too big of a hurdle for the couple to overcome. Guest stars: Barry Floyd as Terrance "Tee Tee" Carter
46	4	"Just the Three of Us"	Salim Akil	Elaine Aronson	October 24, 2008	1.75
Melanie feels jealous after Derwin goes with Janay to her first pregnancy appointment. Meanwhile, Kelly decides that it's time for her and Jason to talk to Brittany.
47	5	"A Delectable Basket of Treats"	Salim Akil	Kenya Barris	October 31, 2008	1.26
Hoping to get more publicity for their celebrity marriage, Robin Givens and Malik plan a belated wedding reception, but Tasha decides to boycott the party since she believes their marriage is a sham and won't support it. At the reception, Derwin and Melanie must face the reality of their complicated relationship after many people mistakenly congratulate Melanie on her pregnancy. Meanwhile, Rick Fox reluctantly introduces Tasha to his overly protective mother (guest star Penny Marshall), causing fireworks to ensue between the two headstrong women. Guest stars: Barry Floyd as Terrance "Tee Tee" Carter
48	6	"The Platski Thickens"	Salim Akil	Jenifer Rice-Genzuk	November 7, 2008	1.67
Attempting to move forward with her life after splitting with Jason, Kelly decides to plan a fun evening out on the town with her high school girlfriends, but leaving her "Mrs. Jason Pitts" past behind her proves tougher than she ever imagined. Jason is also attempting to forget about his troubles with Kelly by going to one of Malik's infamous wild parties, but the next morning he has a whole lot more to regret than having one too many drinks. Guest stars: Barry Floyd as Terrance "Tee Tee" Carter
49	7	"White Coats and White Lies"	Salim Akil	Erica Montolfo	November 14, 2008	1.69
Melanie reluctantly turns to her parents for financial help when she learns that her grant money to cover for her tuition has been revoked and she has been placed on academic probation, Meanwhile, Derwin learns bad news from Irv about his contract negotiations. Tasha and Malik are shocked to learn that her boyfriend Rick and Malik's wife Robin, were once in a relationship; and Kelly goes on her first date since separating from Jason. Melanie and Derwin have a heated argument over Derwin's favoritism for his "son" over her, resulting in Melanie leaving. Guest stars: Barry Floyd as Terrance "Tee Tee" Carter
50	8	"The Side Part, Under Episode"	Salim Akil	Kenny Smith	November 21, 2008	1.57
After the heated argument with Derwin, Melanie concentrates on her work at the hospital, where she becomes attracted to a handsome man (guest star Jason Olive) and after receiving advice from a patient, works things out with Derwin in her own way.
51	9	"Oh, What A Night"	Debbie Allen	Sara Finney-Johnson	November 28, 2008	1.99
Tasha, being insecure, worries that her relationship with Rick Fox has no future so she starts playing the field. Melanie struggles with her relationships. Jason tries to repair his relationship with his daughter Brittany, who blames her father for her parents pending divorce.
52	10	"The Negotiation Episode"	Eric Laneuville	Kenny Smith	January 9, 2009	1.37
Jason tries to win Kelly back and put an end to her divorce talk; Malik grows tired of keeping up the charade of his fake marriage to Robin Givens when she tells him to stop seeing other women.
53	11	"Insert Car Here"	Mary Lou Belli	Erica Montolfo	January 16, 2009	1.59
Jason gets jealous when he sees Kelly on a date; Tasha faces her insecurities in her relationship with Rick Fox; Melanie searches for ways to connect with Derwin that don't involve physical intimacy.
54	12	"Stay Fierce, Malik"	Salim Akil	Eric Lev	January 23, 2009	1.65
Robin Givens implies that Malik is gay on national TV and that it's the reason for their breakup. Malik is then teased by his teammates and discovers one player is actually gay after an incident at Malik's house, but is afraid to come out. Meanwhile, Derwin finds out Melanie was sleeping with a doctor at the hospital where she works. Guest stars: Barry Floyd as Terrance "Tee Tee" Carter
55	13	"Do the Wright Thing"	Salim Akil	Jeremy Howe	January 30, 2009	1.83
Malik is invited to appear on a children's TV show, but the offer is suddenly withdrawn when team officials determine that his outing of a fellow player is bad publicity for the organization. Malik eventually appears on the show and learns a valuable lesson himself.
56	14	"Punk Ass Chauncey"	Salim Akil	Kenya Barris	March 13, 2009	1.53
Malik meets his father Chauncey (guest star Michael Boatman) for the first time. Meanwhile, Derwin and Janay rethink their relationship just as they are about to become parents, which isn't good news to Melanie. Guest stars: Barry Floyd as Terrance "Tee Tee" Carter, Michael Boatman as Chauncey
57	15	"Take a Bow"	Salim Akil	Hale Rothstein	March 20, 2009	1.81
Tasha tries to prevent Rick from losing his job; Malik becomes obsessed with learning everything he can about his father and why they were apart for years; Melanie questions why Derwin is back together with Janay, and Derwin tells her.
58	16	"Truth and Consequences"	Salim Akil	Sara Finney-Johnson	March 27, 2009	1.97
After Kelly betrays Tasha at work, Tasha gets her revenge by introducing Jason to a gorgeous TV personality (guest star Stacey Dash). Rick informs Tasha he's working at ISM in Miami just as Tasha wants to hook up again. working at ISM in Miami just
59	17	"Hill Street Blues"	Salim Akil	Jenifer Rice-Genzuk	April 3, 2009	1.83
Janay's ex-boyfriend (guest star Hill Harper) (appearing as himself) visits while on a book tour and it makes Derwin jealous, prompting a man to man talk on the set of Hill's movie. Melanie feels blue and seeks comfort in the arms of her cable guy (guest star Mowry's Husband Cory Hardrict). Kelly begins dating a gym owner. Melanie gets some closure on her relationship with Derwin, but Derwin realizes after an argument with Janay that the two weren't meant to be.
60	18	"The Third Legacy"	Salim Akil	Eric Lev	April 24, 2009	1.83
Malik meets his half-sister, Pucci (guest star Lisa Tucker), and sees an unmistakably familiar tattoo on her lower back, causing him to wonder whether they may have slept together before they knew they were related. Tasha meets Chauncey's wife, Sheila (guest star Tasha Smith), and realizes that Chauncey married someone who could be Tasha's twin. Guest stars: Barry Floyd as Terrance "Tee Tee" Carter
61	19	"Put a Ring on It"	Salim Akil	Mara Brock Akil	May 1, 2009	1.84
After breaking up with Janay once more, Derwin proposes to Melanie and she accepts after trying to rationalize; Tasha and Kelly throw an engagement party for Melanie and Derwin, but unfortunately, the festivities doesn't run as smoothly as Melanie would have hoped. Jason brings Camille to the engagement party, forcing Kelly to come to terms with her ex's new relationship. She turns around and invites Roman in an attempt to make Jason jealous. Tasha feels awful knowing that she was the person who set Jason up with Camille and that she is keeping that secret from Kelly. Guest stars: Barry Floyd as Terrance "Tee Tee" Carter
62	20	"The Fall of the Roman"	Salim Akil	Elaine Aronson	May 8, 2009	1.82
Jason decides he's ready to introduce his daughter, Brittany, to his new girlfriend, Camille, and Kelly reluctantly agrees. Roman believes he should meet Brittany too, but Kelly feels she isn't ready for him to meet her. But Roman unexpectedly shows up to Brittany's soccer game. After the game, Kelly sparks an argument with Roman about meeting Brittany. Roman grabs Kelly's arm, which instantly makes Brittany call her father. Jason shows up and argues with Roman; Roman makes a rude remark by saying 'Well screw your daughter' which causes Jason to punch Roman in the face. They begin fighting and Jason breaks Roman's nose with a glass structure. Melanie unintentionally finds the perfect wedding dress while shopping with Tasha, but hesitates about buying it. Derwin and Malik find her with the dress at the store, and at Malik's encouragement Derwin buys it for her.
63	21	"I Want It All and I Want It Now"	Salim Akil	Erica Montolfo & Kenny Smith	May 15, 2009	1.78
After Janay has a false alarm, Melanie decides she wants to marry Derwin before the baby arrives, even if it meant sacrificing her dream wedding. Derwin goes to Melanie's parents for their blessing on his and Melanie's wedding, but her mother Grace is appalled and smacks Derwin repeatedly while her son, Cameron, records it. After a minor argument with Derwin, Melanie calls her parents and informs them there will be a wedding, with or without them. Malik introduces his sister Pucci to a music producer named Ronnie and she goes to a party and gets drunk. Kelly rushes to Jason's side after he is arrested for assault and put in jail. After rushing back to the studio to get Pucci home, Malik and Ronnie have a very tense moment before Tasha and their childhood friend and hitman Pookie (guest star Rockmond Dunbar) intervene and get things settled. Guest stars: Barry Floyd as Terrance "Tee Tee" Carter
64	22	"The Wedding Episode"	Salim Akil	Kenny Smith	May 15, 2009	1.78
On the day of Melanie and Derwin's wedding, Kelly announces she and Jason may get back together, so Tasha comes clean about her introducing Jason and Camille. Kelly doesn't take the news well and she attacks Tasha. During the ceremony, Derwin gets a call from Janay that the baby is coming and Melanie tells him to go to the hospital. After Jason's court hearing, Jason leaves with Camille and Kelly is seen crying after realizing she and Jason will not be getting back together. During the last scene, we see Rick come back to Tasha, Melanie and Derwin looking at the baby through the window and Melanie and Derwin finally get married in private. Guest stars: Barry Floyd as Terrance "Tee Tee" Carter

=== Season 4 (2011) ===
- Brittany Daniel and Coby Bell character statuses were demoted to special appearances. Brittany Daniel departs from the series after the eighth episode this season and returns the seventh season.
- From this season onward, the show ran on BET.

No. overall	No. in season	Title	Directed by	Written by	Original release date	US viewers (millions)
65	1	"Parachutes"	Salim Akil	Mara Brock Akil	January 11, 2011	7.68
Season 4 begins 2 years later, and big changes have occurred for both the Saber players and Sunbeams alike. Melanie and Derwin experience a trouble in paradise when Melaine commits a terrible act. Meanwhile, now retired from the Sabers, Jason managed to score another gig as a sports host, however, much to his dismay, Kelly stars in her own reality show; Tasha's new relationship suffers. Elsewhere, while suffering career shortcoming, Malik begins to go on a downward spiral. Note: This episode marks the first appearance of Jigga as Bibs
66	2	"Beach Chairs"	Salim Akil	Mara Brock Akil	January 11, 2011	7.68
Melanie tries getting in between Derwin and his son; Kelly stars in her own reality show; Tasha and Dante's relationship suffers. Malik betrays his best friend, Tee Tee. Melanie gets DJ's DNA results back from the lab.
67	3	"The Confession Episode"	Salim Akil	Kenny Smith, Jr.	January 18, 2011	5.94
Melanie risks her marriage when she tells Derwin the truth about his son, and sends Janay on a warpath in the process. Jason lashes out against the Sabers after being released. Kelly and Tasha decide to settle their differences and become friends again. Absent: Barry Floyd as Terrance "Tee Tee" Carter
68	4	"The Wing King"	Salim Akil	Kenya Barris	January 25, 2011	4.65
Malik's trouble continues and he gets himself arrested while driving drunk in the middle of the night and it jeopardizes his career. Melanie becomes overwhelmed while hosting a charity event, and Jazz, a former groupie, gives Melanie a little dose of reality. Absent: Coby Bell as Jason Pitts, Brittany Daniel as Kelly Pitts
69	5	"It Was All Good Just a Week Ago"	Salim Akil	Hale Rothstein	February 1, 2011	4.82
Backed into a corner, Malik turns to the Sabers' new owner for help; Derwin worries about his own reputation and Malik's social and legal troubles. Malik decides to go to rehab after much advisement. Absent: Brittany Daniel as Kelly Pitts
70	6	"Men in Crisis"	Salim Akil	Sara Finney-Johnson	February 8, 2011	4.33
Derwin tries to make amends with Janay by spending time with his son at her house, and it almost jeopardizes his relationship with Melanie. Elsewhere, Tasha learns a life lesson from Dante.
71	7	"Didn't You Know Who I Was?"	Salim Akil	Elaine Aronson	February 15, 2011	4.20
After Malik is pushed to the limit in rehab when he confesses that he's only there to make himself look better to the public and that he doesn't really need help, he gets into an altercation with Derwin in a club; Derwin and Jason then convince a clearly shaken up Malik to go back to rehab. Meanwhile, Kelly tries to stay involved with the Sunbeams, which forces Melanie to confront her; Rick asks Tasha out, causing Dante to break up with Tasha. Absent: Barry Floyd as Terrance "Tee Tee" Carter
72	8	"You Say Goodbye, I Say Hello"	Salim Akil	Erica Montolfo	February 22, 2011	3.69
Kelly tries to stay relevant as her reality show struggles; Malik searches for the root of his troubles. Special guest star: Fabolous Note: This episode marks the final appearance of Brittany Daniel as Kelly Pitts until the seventh season.
73	9	"A Very Special Episode"	Salim Akil	Jenifer Rice-Genzuk Henry	March 1, 2011	3.75
Melanie tries to spice things up with Derwin; Malik wants to put his life back in order but faces problems that are difficult to resolve. Special guest star: Mo'Nique Guest star: Annie Ilonzeh Absent: Barry Floyd as Terrance "Tee Tee" Carter
74	10	"Whip It, Whip It Good"	Salim Akil	Jenifer Rice-Genzuk Henry & Hale Rothstein	March 8, 2011	3.69
Tasha keeps an eye on Brittany at Jason's request; Melanie's relationship with her parents changes as a result of her marriage. Special guest star: Magic Johnson Absent: Barry Floyd as Terrance "Tee Tee" Carter
75	11	"Never Surrender"	Salim Akil	Kenya Barris	March 15, 2011	3.62
Malik plans to end his affair with Parker; however, Parker later reveals the affair to her husband, who vows to make Malik's life miserable. Tasha's lie about her relationship with Dante is exposed. Absent: Coby Bell as Jason Pitts
76	12	"Death Becomes Her"	Salim Akil	Erica Montolfo	March 22, 2011	3.53
Tasha copes with her new boyfriends illness by making a bucket list for the two of them; Malik learns his job is in jeopardy; and Melanie and Derwin discuss having kids. Absent: Coby Bell as Jason Pitts, Barry Floyd as Terrance "Tee Tee" Carter.
77	13	"The Right to Choose"	Salim Akil	Kenny Smith	March 29, 2011	4.43
In the Season 4 finale, Melanie and Derwin see a fertility specialist; Jenna chooses not to reconcile with Malik; and Tasha has an upsetting run-in with Bo. Absent: Barry Floyd as Terrance "Tee Tee" Carter

=== Season 5 (2012) ===
On April 12, 2011, it was announced that The Game was renewed for a fifth season, consisting of 22 episodes. It was announced on the 2011 BET Awards Pre-show that it will begin in January 2012. This is Tia Mowry-Hardrict’s last season to appear and returns in the series finale.

No. overall	No. in season	Title	Directed by	Written by	Original release date	US viewers (millions)
78	1	"Skeletons"	Bille Woodruff	Mara Brock Akil & Salim Akil	January 10, 2012	5.28
Season 5 opens with Melanie grappling with Derwin's accusation that she had an abortion. Meanwhile, Malik and Tasha deal with a drunken Jenna. Later, Tasha corners Malik about his relationship with Jenna; and a wild night comes back to haunt Jason. In the fifth season premiere, after Derwin's accusations of abortion, Melanie reveals a dark secret from her past. Malik and Tasha take care of a relapsed Jenna and Jason meets a feisty new bartender. Note: This episode marks the first appearance of Brandy Norwood as Chardonnay Pitts.
79	2	"The Truth Pact"	Bille Woodruff	Mara Brock Akil & Salim Akil	January 10, 2012	5.28
Melanie confesses to Derwin; Malik's relationship with Jenna; Jason's wild night in Mexico. Tee-Tee gives Tasha some words of advice. In the second half of the fifth season opener, Tasha corners Malik about his relationship with Jenna while a wild night with a bartender comes back to haunt Jason.
80	3	"No Money, No Problems"	Bille Woodruff	Erica Montolfo-Bura	January 17, 2012	3.64
When Derwin rehires Irv it sets off Melanie searching for her role in life while Tasha sues Derwin and Irv for money she believes she is owed. Meanwhile, Malik is forced to evaluate his extravagant lifestyle. Absent: Coby Bell as Jason Pitts, Brandy Norwood as Chardonnay Pitts
81	4	"The Black People Episode"	Eric Laneuville	Kenny Smith, Jr.	January 24, 2012	2.88
Hostility between Melanie and Tasha goes public at a fashion show. Elsewhere, Chardonnay's friends open Jason's eyes to racism; and Derwin takes Kwan under his wings. Absent: Barry Floyd as Terrance "Tee Tee" Carter Note: Featuring Elimu Nelson and Kel Mitchell.
82	5	"Grand Opening, Grand Closing"	Eric Laneuville	Hale Rothstein & Mara Brock Akil	January 31, 2012	3.20
Jason's ego takes a hit when Chardonnay rejects his proposal about hooking up after their upcoming annulment. Meanwhile, Derwin is shocked to find out Melanie is living the V.I.P. life at church. Absent: Barry Floyd as Terrance "Tee Tee" Carter
83	6	"Drink, Fight, Pray, Love"	Joseph Mills	Jackie Mills	February 7, 2012	2.82
Melanie has a showdown with Tasha at Drop Bar. Malik has a hard time letting go of his dream home when he's forced to short sell his mansion.
84	7	"The Tricks Episode"	Eric Laneuville	Kenny Smith Jr. & Mara Brock Akil	February 14, 2012	2.41
When a YouTube video of Malik and Derwin doing football tricks goes viral, the guys ride the wave hoping it takes Malik off the bench and back onto the field. Absent: Coby Bell as Jason Pitts, Brandy Norwood as Chardonnay Pitts
85	8	"Matchmaker, Matchmaker...Mind Your Business!"	Eric Laneuville	Erica Montolfo & Mara Brock Akil	February 28, 2012	2.62
Tasha falls for an escort. Melanie throws a dinner party for Janay and Janay's new boyfriend. Absent: Coby Bell as Jason Pitts, Brandy Norwood as Chardonnay Pitts
86	9	"Keep Your Friends Close and Your Prostitute Closer"	Mary Lou Belli	Jenifer Rice-Genzuk & Mara Brock Akil	March 6, 2012	2.45
Melanie attempts to foster goodwill between her and Janay. Tasha's still falls for her new relationship. Absent: Coby Bell as Jason Pitts, Brandy Norwood as Chardonnay Pitts
87	10	"Catfight on the Catwalk"	Mary Lou Belli	Matthew Claybrooks & Mara Brock Akil	March 13, 2012	2.39
Melanie hosts the Sunbeam's fashion show, but ends up being locked in the bathroom with Tasha. While having sex with three supermodels, Malik has trouble getting aroused, and goes to rehab to visit Jenna. Absent: Brandy Norwood as Chardonnay Pitts
88	11	"A Punch in the Gut...Full of Human"	Rob Hardy	Jenifer Rice-Genzuk & Mara Brock Akil	March 20, 2012	2.38
Jason's relationship with Chardonnay is tested by a third party; Derwin and Melanie receive troubling news at the fertility clinic; Chardonnay reaches out to Tasha for relationship advice. Absent: Barry Floyd as Terrance "Tee Tee" Carter
89	12	"Higher Ground"	Rob Hardy	Elaine Aronson	March 27, 2012	2.52
Tasha agrees to be the surrogate for Melanie and Derwin; Derwin's poker night turns into a raging bash. Absent: Brandy Norwood as Chardonnay Pitts
90	13	"There's No Place Like Home II"	Rob Hardy	Sara Finney-Johnson	April 3, 2012	2.01
Malik mulls over an endorsement offer; an unexpected arrival tests Melanie and Derwin. Absent: Coby Bell as Jason Pitts, Brandy Norwood as Chardonnay Pitts
91	14	"Derwin's About to go H.A.M"	Rob Hardy	Hale Rothstein & Mara Brock Akil	April 10, 2012	2.26
Derwin misses a basic block during a game, causing a season-ending injury to the starting quarterback. Conversely, it's Malik who then shines on the field. Elsewhere, infertility and surrogate issues plague Melanie. Absent: Barry Floyd as Terrance "Tee Tee" Carter, Brandy Norwood as Chardonnay Pitts
92	15	"Party in a Box"	Kenny Smith Jr.	Matthew Claybrooks	April 17, 2012	2.19
Jason introduces Chardonnay to his friends; Kwan's injury. Absent: Barry Floyd as Terrance "Tee Tee" Carter
93	16	"Fits and Starts"	Kenny Smith Jr.	Matthew Claybrooks & Mara Brock Akil	April 24, 2012	2.11
Tasha and Pookie explore their friendship; Janay goes out of town; Melanie and Derwin stay busy. Absent: Coby Bell as Jason Pitts, Brandy Norwood as Chardonnay Pitts Note: This episode marks the final appearance of Gabrielle Dennis as Janay.
94	17	"A Woman's Right to Choose Herself"	Bille Woodruff	Erica Montolfo-Bura	May 1, 2012	2.04
Tasha struggles with being a surrogate for Melanie. Meanwhile, Jason helps Chardonnay with her finances after spotting her waiting at a bus stop. Melanie's discontent with Derwin.
95	18	"Breakthrough, Breakdown? Break- Through"	Bille Woodruff	Hale Rothstein	May 8, 2012	1.94
Melanie does some soul searching. Meanwhile, ghosts from Malik's wild past come back to haunt him with a vengeance. Guest star: Bryce Wilson
96	19	"Let Them Eat (Cup) Cake!"	Mary Lou Belli	Jenifer Rice-Genzuk Henry	May 15, 2012	2.08
Melanie's finally has her important interview. Meanwhile, Tasha joins the cupcake club to renew her celibacy. Guest star: Nicole Sullivan Absent: Coby Bell as Jason Pitts, Brandy Norwood as Chardonnay Pitts
97	20	"Cold Swine Sucks...And So Does Falling in Love"	Mary Lou Belli	Jenifer Rice-Genzuk Henry	May 22, 2012	1.99
Tasha discovers a disturbing text message. Meanwhile, push comes to shove when Derwin body slams his agent, Irv. Guest stars: Free, Mekia Cox, Dustin Diamond Absnet: Coby Bell as Jason Pitts, Barry Floyd as Terrance "Tee Tee" Carter, Brandy Norwood as Chardonnay Pitts
98	21	"Move Trick, Get Out the Way"	Salim Akil	Hale Rothstein	May 29, 2012	2.24
Melanie and Derwin spar during championship game week while Malik gets into a heated argument with Jenna. Meanwhile, Jason makes a relationship decision about Chardonnay. Also, Pookie offers to help Tasha. Absent: Barry Floyd as Terrance "Tee Tee" Carter
99	22	"The Championship Game Episode"	Salim Akil	Kenny Smith	June 5, 2012	2.49
Season 5 closes when Derwin decides to spend off season in Washington D.C. with Melanie for a fresh start; Malik decides to break up with Jenna and decides to go back to his old ways of being a player and Jason and Chardonnay become husband and wife and the co-owners of Spadonnay. Absent: Barry Floyd as Terrance "Tee Tee" Carter Note: This episode marks the final appearance of Tia Mowry as Melanie Barnett-Davis until the series finale.

=== Season 6 (2013) ===
- Lauren London and Jay Ellis joining the cast.
- Tia Mowry and Pooch Hall are no longer part of the main cast
- Pooch Hall makes a guest appearance in one episode "The Blueprint"

No. overall	No. in season	Title	Directed by	Written by	Original release date	US viewers (millions)
100–101	1–2	"The Blueprint"	Salim Akil	Mara Brock Akil	March 26, 2013	2.54
Derwin’s professional and personal life are in disarray after he is traded from the Sabers. Romantic complications ensue for Blue and Keira after she helps him deal with the aftermath of this scuffle with Derwin Special guest star: Pooch Hall as Derwin Davis. Guest appearances by: Ciara, Raymond Edwards, Jr., John Singleton & William Allen Young Note: This episode marks the final appearance of Pooch Hall as Derwin Davis until the series finale. This episode marks the first appearances of Lauren London as Keira Whitaker and Jay Ellis as Bryce "Blue" Westbrook. This episode marks the return appearance of Coby Bell as Jason Pitts who was promoted back to the main cast as well the first appearance of Brandy Norwood as Chardonnay Pitts as a main cast member.
102	3	"We Gotta Stop Meeting Like This"	Salim Akil	Erica Montolfo-Bura	April 2, 2013	1.81
Tasha takes steps to prove to Pookie that she’s dedicated to him while simultaneously struggling with her attraction to Rick. Absent: Barry Floyd as Terrance "Tee Tee" Carter
103	4	"Getting to Know All a Butt You"	Salim Akil	Marcos Luevanos	April 9, 2013	2.12
In an attempt to expand his empire beyond football, Malik seeks out an investor for his new business venture. Absent: Lauren London as Keira Whitaker
104	5	"Trashbox"	Salim Akil	Kenya Barris	April 16, 2013	1.88
Keira bids a lot of money on a date with Blue at a charity auction in order to maintain her high-profile image, resulting in a confession that her income isn’t as expendable as it used to be. Guest star: Angela Simmons Absent: Hosea Chanchez as Malik Wright, Barry Floyd as Terrance "Tee Tee" Carter
105	6	"Guess Who's Bizzack"	Mary Lou Belli	Hale Rothstein	April 23, 2013	1.60
When Blue struggles at training camp, Jason takes to the field to show him how it’s done, winning praise from Malik who tries to convince his former teammate to re-sign with the Sabers.
106	7	"Welcome to the Jungle"	Mary Lou Belli	Hale Rothstein	April 30, 2013	2.14
Keira and Chardonnay receive a less than warm welcome when they are initiated into the Sunbeams. Absent: Barry Floyd as Terrance "Tee Tee" Carter Note: Melanie and Kelly are heavily mentioned throughout this episode.
107	8	"How to Lose All Your Phat in One Day"	Mary Lou Belli	Jenifer Rice-Genzuk Henry	May 7, 2013	1.96
Malik throws a party hoping to land investors for his latest business venture, only to meet an heiress/business woman, who forces him to re-evaluate his entire business approach and plan. Guest star: Earthquake
108	9	"Blue Canvases"	Bille Woodruff	Erica Montolfo-Bura	May 14, 2013	1.92
Blue helps Keira prepare for an audition, resulting in an intimate “first” kiss moment for the couple. Absent: Barry Floyd as Terrance "Tee Tee" Carter
109	10	"The Pre-Season Game Episode"	Salim Akil	Kenny Smith	May 21, 2013	1.74
Blue struggles with his feelings after learning that Keira was a virgin before she slept with him. Absent: Barry Floyd as Terrance "Tee Tee" Carter
110	11	"The Busted Episode"	Bille Woodruff	Kenny Smith	July 2, 2013	3.58
Tasha attempts to salvage her friendship with Pookie after it is revealed she has been cheating on him with Rick. Absent: Barry Floyd as Terrance "Tee Tee" Carter
111	12	"I'm Not Kelly Pitts"	Bille Woodruff	Marcos Luevanos	July 9, 2013	2.41
Chardonnay keeps her friendship with Tasha a secret. Meanwhile, Keira tries to talk to Blue. Absent: Barry Floyd as Terrance "Tee Tee" Carter Note: Kelly is heavily mentioned throughout this episode, hence the episode title. Do Miss You Melanie & Derwin.
112	13	"I Love Luke...ahh!"	Mary Lou Belli	Jenifer Rice-Genzuk Henry	July 16, 2013	2.48
Blue tries to sabotage Keira's new relationship. Meanwhile, Malik's past comes back to haunt him, and Chardonnay struggles to deal with Jason's gridiron injury. Guest stars: Navid Negahban, Victor M. Jackson II Absent: Barry Floyd as Terrance "Tee Tee" Carter
113	14	"Photo-Shoot Fresh"	Nzingha Stewart	Hale Rothstein	July 23, 2013	2.59
Malik enlists his friends to appear in a promotional campaign, but an accusation derails his plans. Elsewhere, events run smoothly for Rick, to Tasha's chagrin. Blue sets out to beat Keira in the dating game and an injury impacts Jason's life. Guest stars: Derek Blanks, Ciara Absent: Barry Floyd as Terrance "Tee Tee" Carter
114	15	"Psh!! I'm Good"	Kenny Smith	Kenya Barris	July 30, 2013	2.66
Malik invites Blue to a lusty party to help him get over Keira. Meanwhile, Jason works to heal his serious ailments before an important game; and Chardonnay worries more about Jason's health after visiting a retired player. Guest star: Travis Porter Absent: Barry Floyd as Terrance "Tee Tee" Carter
115	16	"A Swan Song for Rick and Tasha"	Mary Lou Belli	Jenifer Rice-Genzuk Henry	August 6, 2013	2.50
Blue begins to worry about his relationship with Keira after the team considers her bad luck. Tasha breaks up with Rick after realizing that she isn't happy. Rick's comedy career flounders. Guest stars: Ryan Stewart, Douglas Stewart Absent: Coby Bell as Jason Pitts, Barry Floyd as Terrance "Tee Tee" Carter
116	17	"Miss Me a Little When I'm Gone"	Eric Laneuville	Story by : Hale Rothstein; Teleplay by : Cydney Kelley	August 13, 2013	2.14
Malik must decide between Reece and Tori. Blue and Keira discuss the truth aspect of their relationship. Tasha and Chardonnay drink. Guest star: William Allen Young Absent: Coby Bell as Jason Pitts, Barry Floyd as Terrance "Tee Tee" Carter
117	18	"In Treatment"	Kenny Smith	Erica Montolfo-Bura	August 20, 2013	2.21
Tasha spends a day in therapy to deal with her relationship issues. Malik gets help with his problems. Guest star: Curtis Armstrong Absent: Coby Bell as Jason Pitts, Barry Floyd as Terrance "Tee Tee" Carter, Brandy Norwood as Chardonnay Pitts, Jay Ellis as Bryce Blue Westbrook, Lauren London as Keira Whitaker
118	19	"Extra Butter...Extra Salt..."	Eric Laneuville	Kenya Barris	August 27, 2013	2.40
Blue scrutinizes Keira's fling with Luke while at a movie premiere. Meanwhile, Tasha is inspired by a therapy session and begins apologizing to everybody. Jason and Chardonnay clash over his gridiron career and Malik reconnects with Tee Tee. Malik finds himself in a confrontation against a group of men that could have fatal results Guest stars: Greg Jennings, Richard Gant
119	20	"The Hospital Episode"	Eric Laneuville	Kenny Smith	September 3, 2013	3.77
In the sixth season finale, Malik is in the hospital after being beaten badly by a group of men. Meanwhile, Blue and Keira's relationship is tested after the Baggers premiere after party, he finds out she lied about being intimate with Luke. Jason and Chardonnay's relationship is in trouble when she finds a note in Jason's coat pocket that he wrote to Kelly and he tells Chardonnay that he has another note for her, telling that he loves her and wants to be with her. Malik then finds out that he won't have full use of his arm again meaning that he can't play football for a long time. Guest star: Richard Gant

=== Season 7 (2014) ===
- Brittany Daniel returns this season as a recurring cast member beginning with the fourth episode.

No. overall	No. in season	Title	Directed by	Written by	Original release date	US viewers (millions)
120–121	1–2	"The Jersey Episode (Part 1 & 2)"	Salim Akil	Kenny Smith	March 4, 2014	3.35
Malik is no longer able to play, Keira and Blue are still broken up and Jason Pitts is ready to live his retired life. Tasha Mack is convinced she’s going through menopause, though Chardonnay suspects it’s something else. In part two of the season premiere, Jason confronts the ex-player who provided him with steroids several seasons ago. Keira’s drunk antics lead to an argument in the bathroom stall as the actress catches Blue with his pants down (literally). Absent: Barry Floyd as Terrance Tee Tee Carter
122	3	"Rules of the Street"	Salim Akil	Kenya Barris	March 11, 2014	2.28
Malik is forced to enter rehab after much denial about his arm problem. Tasha finally visits a doctor and learns she’s much further along in her pregnancy than she initially believed.
123	4	"Missed You, Kelly Pitts"	Bille Woodruff	Erica Montolfo-Bura	March 18, 2014	2.74
While on the phone, Jason opens the door to find his ex-wife, Kelly Pitts, at the door steps. She has returned to help her daughter, Brit, plan her pre-prom party. Absent: Barry Floyd as Terrance "Tee Tee" Carter Note: This episode marks the return appearance of Brittany Daniel as Kelly Pitts since the fourth season.
124	5	"Intervention, My Ass"	Bille Woodruff	Hale Rothstein	March 25, 2014	3.06
Chardonnay holds an intervention for Tasha and gets more than what she bargained for. Yana shows up at Malik’s door and gets emotional after she goes to use the bathroom. Tee Tee gets served a subpoena. Absent: Brittany Daniel as Kelly Pitts
125	6	"He's a No-Good, Lyin', Cheatin', Honky-Tonk Man!"	Kenny Smith	Jenifer Rice-Genzuk Henry	April 1, 2014	2.80
Keira inadvertently starts a fire that leads to some major consequences. Jason gets kicked out of the house by Chardonnay. Tasha learns she is having a daughter. Absent: Brittany Daniel as Kelly Pitts
126	7	"Chardonnay Goes Kissing"	Kenny Smith	Hale Rothstein	April 8, 2014	2.63
Chardonnay is upset that Jason kissed Kelly and decides that the best thing to do is find someone else that she can kiss. Meanwhile, Malik and Yana go clubbing together and run into a familiar face. Absent: Brittany Daniel as Kelly Pitts
127	8	"Mommy Dearest"	Salim Akil	Erica Montolfo-Bura	April 15, 2014	2.59
After making up, Jason and Chardonnay have decided to renew their vows. Chardonnay takes it upon herself to make extravagant arrangements.
128	9	"This Is Happening"	Salim Akil	Erica Montolfo-Bura	April 22, 2014	2.10
Kelly and Chardonnay have a heart-to-heart after Tasha’s baby shower.
129	10	"The Birth & Vows Episode"	Salim Akil	Kenny Smith	April 29, 2014	2.53
Can Chardonnay walk down the aisle without a hitch? Will Tasha find out who her baby’s father is? Will Blue and Keira work out their problems? All this and more on the season 7 finale.

=== Season 8 (2015) ===
No. overall	No. in season	Title	Directed by	Written by	Original release date	US viewers (millions)
130	1	"The Wedding Night Episode"	Kenny Smith	Kenny Smith	January 14, 2015	3.13
In the Season 8 premiere, Chardonnay goes on an emotional roller coaster ride after getting jilted at the altar. Kelly rebuffs Jason's declaration of love and tries to make amends with Chardonnay. Jason is torn between both women. Meanwhile, Pookie fulfills his fatherly duties, which causes Tasha to think they could possibly be a family. Malik forges Yana's signature so he can arrange football tryouts. Keira and Blue's elopement plans stall.
131	2	"The After The Wedding Night Episode"	Kenny Smith	Kenny Smith	January 14, 2015	3.13
Chardonnay goes on an emotional roller coaster ride; Kelly's love with Jason and makes amends with Chardonnay; Jason is torn between two women.
132	3	"The Pitsy Shuffle: Why Pitts Really Dipped?"	Kenny Smith	Jenifer Rice-Genzuk Henry	January 21, 2015	1.49
After her jilting circulates around the media, Chardonnay goes on the Perez Hilton show to clear her name with Tasha's help. Later on, she confronts Jason and demands the truth from him. Meanwhile, Jason and Blue lock horns at training, but eventually learn to focus on the game. Tasha avoids her mommy duties. Absent: Brittany Daniel as Kelly Pitts
133	4	"Nothing Was the Game"	Kenny Smith	Niya Palmer & Vanessa McGee	January 28, 2015	1.32
Malik manipulates Jason; Tasha commits to motherhood; Keira has a humiliating experience. Absent: Barry Floyd as Terrance Tee Tee Carter, Brittany Daniel as Kelly Pitts
134	5	"A Saber's Story"	Janice Cooke	Bennie R. Richburg, Jr.	February 4, 2015	1.48
Malik finally rejoins the team, but is upset when Blue is made captain of the Sabers; Chardonnay quits the Sunbeams after her divorce from Jason which puts her friendship with Tasha in jeopardy; Keira has trouble balancing acting and being on the Sunbeams. Absent: Barry Floyd as Terrance Tee Tee Carter, Brittany Daniel as Kelly Pitts
135	6	"Acting Class and Rebound Ass"	Eric Laneuville	Jenifer Rice-Genzuk Henry	February 11, 2015	1.56
Keira and Malik share an unexpected, heated moment at her acting class; A divorce party is thrown for Chardonnay by her sorority sister; and Kelly decides to return to San Diego. Absent: Jay Ellis as Bryce Blue Westbrook, Barry Floyd as Terrance Tee Tee Carter
136	7	"Sexual Healing"	Eric Laneuville	Hale Rothstein	February 25, 2015	1.36
Jason's date with Kelly turns weird; Keira and Malik share an awkward movie night which turns sexual; and Tasha tries to convince Blue to become her new client; and Chardonnay makes a life-changing decision. Absent: Barry Floyd as Terrance Tee Tee Carter
137	8	"Switch!"	Janice Cooke	Hale Rothstein	March 4, 2015	1.46
Jason gets christened as interim head coach for the Sabers; Blue and Keira argue over Blue's jealousy towards her and Malik; Malik and Keira admit their feelings; Chardonnay swears revenge on Jason and vows to return to San Diego. Absent: Barry Floyd as Terrance Tee Tee Carter

=== Season 9 (2015) ===
- Tia Mowry & Pooch Hall returns this season beginning with the tenth and final episode.

No. overall	No. in season	Title	Directed by	Written by	Original release date	US viewers (millions)
138	1	"The Kiss Fallout Episode"	Janice Cooke	Kenny Smith	June 3, 2015	1.35
In the Season 9 opener, Blue brawls with Malik over Keira and Tasha tries to cover it up; Jason's steroid use is exposed. Absent: Barry Floyd as Terrance Tee Tee Carter
139	2	"The Spin Control Episode"	Janice Cooke	Kenny Smith	June 10, 2015	1.47
Blue, Keira, and Malik face the consequences and fallout from their elevator brawl, putting Blue in the hot seat. Chardonnay has an intriguing meeting with Roger Keith Jr. Absent: Barry Floyd as Terrance Tee Tee Carter
140	3	"The Dead Episode"	Maurice Marable	Kenny Smith	June 17, 2015	1.41
Jason holds a peace meeting for Blue and Malik; Malik tracks down Keira to apologize; Tasha deals with a life-altering family crisis when her father dies. Absent: Lauren London as Keira Whitaker
141	4	"Dust in the Wind"	Mara Brock Akil	Hale Rothstein	June 24, 2015	1.31
Malik's reading abilities are challenged during Walter's memorial service; Malik and Kelly's forge an alliance; and after a grieving Tasha puts her father to rest, she is able to help Blue and Chardonnay put their failed relationships behind them. Absent: Barry Floyd as Terrance Tee Tee Carter, Lauren London as Keira Whitaker.
142	5	"Hashtag My Bad"	Salim Akil	Jenifer Rice-Genzuk Henry	June 30, 2015	0.71
Keira confronts Malik and discovers her true feelings for him; Tasha is known as "Super Mom" in People Magazine with Kai; chaos interrupts after a controversial statement made by Roger Keith. Absent: Barry Floyd as Terrance Tee Tee Carter, Brittany Daniel as Kelly Pitts.
143	6	"Get Up, Stand Up"	Salim Akil	Sonja Warfield	July 8, 2015	1.21
The Sabers walkout crisis comes to head and Blue is the only one to get the team to stand up; Kelly and Jason hold a town hall meeting; Keira and Malik go out on a date but they encounter someone from their past. Absent: Barry Floyd as Terrance Tee Tee Carter
144	7	"Clip It...Clip It Good"	Kenny Smith	Jenifer Rice-Genzuk Henry	July 15, 2015	1.23
A late night work session with Blue turns into a trip down memory lane for Jason as he reminisces about the past 9 years. Absent: Hosea Chanchez as Malik Wright, Barry Floyd as Terrance Tee Tee Carter, Brittany Daniel as Kelly Pitts, Brandy Norwood as Chardonnay Pitts, Lauren London as Keira Whitaker. Note: Melanie and Derwin are heavily mentioned and seen in flashbacks throughout this episode.
145	8	"The Crying Game"	Maurice Marable	Hale Rothstein	July 22, 2015	1.29
Tasha's attempt to get Malik and Yana back together falls short; Chardonnay accepts Roger Junior's date. Absent: Jay Ellis as Bryce Blue Westbrook.
146	9	"What More Can I Say?"	Salim Akil	Hale Rothstein	July 29, 2015	1.43
Jason and Kelly are shocked when they learn that Herbie Lesser has purchased the Sabers; the Sabers are stricken with food poisoning. Keira begins to question her relationship with Malik; Meanwhile, Chardonnay does the same with Roger Keith Jr. Tasha comes face-to-face with her exes, Pookie & Rick Fox.
147	10	"Pow Pow Pow!"	Salim Akil	Mara Brock Akil	August 5, 2015	1.77
Pookie accidentally shoots Rick Fox, who bonds with Chardonnay when she drives him to the hospital. In others events, Malik leads the Sabers to a comeback win, which sends them to the playoffs. Melanie and Derwin make a special return as Melanie is pregnant with twins. Melanie and Derwin decides to return to San Diego. Kelly and Jason go to the mat with Herbie Lesser in an effort to save Jason's job; Malik proposes to Keira; Chardonnay wakes up in Las Vegas; Melanie and Derwin have their twins, both healthy; Keira moves forward and focuses on her career; and Tasha and Pookie have a happy ending moving into a new house together. Melanie and Derwin swing by the Sabers stadium to find their friends. Special guest stars: Tia Mowry as Melanie and Pooch Hall as Derwin Note: This episode marks the return appearances of Tia Mowry as Melanie Barnett-Davis since the fifth season and Pooch Hall as Derwin Davis since the sixth season. Special extended hour long episode.

== Viewing figures ==
=== Seasons 1–3 ===
The Game : U.S. viewers per episode (millions)

Season	Episode number																					
Season	1	2	3	4	5	6	7	8	9	10	11	12	13	14	15	16	17	18	19	20	21	22
1	2.60	2.69	2.65	2.48	2.85	2.86	2.43	2.42	2.83	2.71	2.25	2.27	2.63	2.52	2.28	2.47	2.14	2.37	2.55	2.41	2.51	2.51
2	2.98	2.86	2.68	2.61	2.42	2.26	2.55	2.35	2.80	2.42	2.11	1.26	1.50	1.26	1.55	1.46	1.58	1.45	1.58	1.66	–	
3	1.95	1.81	1.81	1.75	1.26	1.67	1.69	1.57	1.99	1.37	1.59	1.65	1.83	1.53	1.81	1.97	1.83	1.83	1.84	1.82	1.78	1.78

Audience measurement performed by Nielsen Media Research

=== Seasons 4–6 ===
The Game : U.S. viewers per episode (millions)

Season	Episode number																					
Season	1	2	3	4	5	6	7	8	9	10	11	12	13	14	15	16	17	18	19	20	21	22
4	7.68	7.68	5.94	4.65	4.82	4.33	4.20	3.69	3.75	3.69	3.62	3.53	4.43	–								
5	5.28	5.28	3.64	2.88	3.20	2.82	2.41	2.62	2.45	2.39	2.38	2.52	2.01	2.26	2.19	2.11	2.04	1.94	2.08	1.99	2.24	2.49
6	2.54	2.54	1.81	2.12	1.88	1.60	2.14	1.96	1.92	1.74	3.58	2.41	2.48	2.59	2.66	2.50	2.14	2.21	2.40	3.77	–	

Audience measurement performed by Nielsen Media Research

=== Seasons 7–9 ===
The Game : U.S. viewers per episode (millions)

Season	Episode number									
Season	1	2	3	4	5	6	7	8	9	10
7	3.35	3.35	2.28	2.74	3.06	2.80	2.63	2.59	2.10	2.53
8	3.13	3.13	1.49	1.32	1.48	1.56	1.36	1.46	–	
9	1.35	1.47	1.41	1.31	0.71	1.21	1.23	1.29	1.43	1.77

Audience measurement performed by Nielsen Media Research
