= The Game (2006 TV series) =

American comedy-drama television series

- Genre: Sitcom (seasons 1–3); Comedy drama (seasons 4–9); Sports
- Created by: Mara Brock Akil
- Starring: Tia Mowry; Brittany Daniel; Hosea Chanchez; Coby Bell; Pooch Hall; Wendy Raquel Robinson; Barry Floyd; Brandy Norwood; Lauren London; Jay Ellis
- Theme music composer: Kurt Farquhar; Def Jef; James D. Joiner III
- Country of origin: United States
- Original language: English
- No. of seasons: 9
- No. of episodes: 147 (list of episodes)

Production
- Executive producers: Mara Brock Akil; Salim Akil; Kenny Smith Jr.; Erica Montolfo-Bura; Kelsey Grammer; Devon Greggory; Tom Russo; Peter O'Fallon; Kevin Bray; Jordan McMahon
- Producers: Dan Dugan; Ken Farrington; Bobbi Sue Luther
- Production locations: Atlanta, Georgia
- Editors: Travis G. Rendich; Timothy Mozer
- Camera setup: Multi-camera
- Running time: 22–24 minutes (CW/BET)
- Production companies: Georgia Media (seasons 4–9); Happy Camper Productions (seasons 1–2); Akil Productions (seasons 3–9); Grammnet Productions; CBS Paramount Network Television (seasons 1–3); CBS Television Studios (seasons 4–9); BET Original Productions (seasons 4–9)

Original release
- Network: The CW
- Release: October 1, 2006 – May 15, 2009
- Network: BET
- Release: January 11, 2011 – August 5, 2015

Related
- Girlfriends; The Game (2021)

The Game is an American comedy-drama television series created by Mara Brock Akil. A spin-off of UPN's Girlfriends, the series premiered on its successor network The CW on October 1, 2006. The show was canceled in May 2009 after three seasons. Viacom's BET Networks struck a deal with CBS Corporation to develop new episodes of the series and moved the taping of the show from Los Angeles to Atlanta, announcing its renewal at the April 2010 upfronts. New seasons began airing on BET starting January 11, 2011, with the fourth-season premiere drawing 7.7 million viewers, making it the most-watched sitcom premiere in cable television history. The show aired for six seasons on BET, being renewed for its final two in 2014, and concluding its run on August 5, 2015.

In May 2021, a revival of the series was ordered by Paramount+ with Robinson and Chanchez returning. The revival series premiered on November 11, 2021, and was renewed for a second season in February 2022. On June 23, 2023, it was announced that the series was canceled after two seasons. On June 26, 2023, The Game was removed from Paramount+.

== Premise ==
For the first five seasons, The Game was centered on Joan Clayton's first cousin, Melanie Barnett (Tia Mowry), who was introduced in the 2006 Girlfriends episode of the same name. Melanie is a first-year medical student who has given up an offer of admission to Johns Hopkins University School of Medicine in Baltimore to follow her boyfriend, Derwin Davis (Pooch Hall), to San Diego, against the advice of her parents. Derwin is a first-year American football player with a fictional "San Diego Sabers" team. As Melanie settles into her new life, she meets Tasha Mack (Wendy Raquel Robinson), the mother of Sabers' starting quarterback Malik Wright (Hosea Chanchez), and Kelly Pitts (Brittany Daniel), the then-wife of Sabers' captain Jason Pitts (Coby Bell), who warn her to keep a close eye on her boyfriend because of the numerous "gold diggers" who approach the professional American football players. As Melanie learns to balance her new roles as both med student and the partner of a professional American football player, the series focuses on the evolving relationships between the players and their significant others.

== Episodes ==
Season	Episodes	Originally released		
Season	Episodes	First released	Last released	Network
Backdoor pilot		April 17, 2006		UPN
1	22	October 1, 2006	May 14, 2007	The CW
2	20	October 1, 2007	May 18, 2008	The CW
3	22	October 3, 2008	May 15, 2009	The CW
4	13	January 11, 2011	March 29, 2011	BET
5	22	January 10, 2012	June 5, 2012	BET
6	20	March 26, 2013	September 3, 2013	BET
7	10	March 4, 2014	April 29, 2014	BET
8	8	January 14, 2015	March 4, 2015	BET
9	10	June 3, 2015	August 5, 2015	BET

== Cast ==
=== Main cast ===
- Tia Mowry as Melanie Barnett-Davis, M.D. (seasons 1−5; guest season 9) - Melanie is the show's main protagonist. In season one, Melanie is a medical student who gave up the chance to attend Johns Hopkins School of Medicine to move to San Diego with her boyfriend Derwin Davis while attending a less prestigious medical school in the area. Melanie is the cousin of Los Angeles attorney-turned-restaurateur Joan Clayton (of Girlfriends). In season one, Melanie and Derwin break up due to Derwin's infidelity with singer Drew Sidora, which starts a series of ups-and-downs between the two. In the season three finale, Melanie finally marries Derwin during a private ceremony, after the public ceremony was interrupted by the birth of Derwin's son by his ex-girlfriend Janay. In season five, after confessing that she felt empty being just a housewife despite their wealth and Derwin's success, she decides to pursue her medical career and begin a residency program at Johns Hopkins School of Medicine. Derwin was against it at first but eventually came around. In May 2012, Mowry announced via her Twitter account that she would not be returning to The Game in season six. In the series finale, Melanie made an appearance in where she was pregnant with her and Derwin's twin babies, and as the episode closes, it's shown that she has had a boy and girl. She did not appear in season 6, season 7 and season 8.
- Pooch Hall as Derwin Davis (seasons 1−5; guest seasons 6 and 9) - Derwin is a wide receiver for the San Diego Sabers and husband of Melanie Barnett. In the season one finale, Derwin has an affair with Drew Sidora, and Melanie breaks off the relationship. In the beginning of season 2, after desperately trying to get her back, Derwin acts out against Melanie for a bit until she saves him from a gold digger who tried to "trap" him by getting her pregnant. Derwin and Melanie became cordial for a while as they both went their own ways and were seeing other people, but a run-in at a grocery store and later at Derwin's apartment on the day of the Super Bowl stirred their old feelings of love again, as the two passionately kiss upon sight the second time. The off-field drama didn't affect Derwin's play on the field though, as he became a rising star for the Sabers until he suffered a bad knee injury in a playoff game. In the season two finale, he finds out his ex-girlfriend Janay is pregnant with his baby, and he and Melanie get back together. Derwin ran into some on-the-field issues (due to his injury, the Sabers considered cutting him for a while) and off-the-field issues throughout season 3 (questions about whether he was actually the father of Janay's baby, Melanie and Janay feuding, getting with Melanie but not being all in, Melanie breaking up then getting back with him while having an affair with a handsome doctor, Derwin breaking up and then trying to get with Janay only for the baby's sake, and finally breaking up with Janay and proposing to Melanie). In the season three finale, Derwin's son is born and he finally marries Melanie in a private ceremony. In the fourth-season premiere, there are still some questions regarding the true paternity of Derwin's son. Derwin also emerges as a superstar player in season 4, getting numerous endorsement deals, including Nike, and becoming the new face of the Sabers organization. In May 2012, it was announced that Hall would not return to The Game for the sixth season; however, in August 2012 it was announced that he would be returning, but Hall would only appear in one episode. In season 6, Derwin was traded to Baltimore in exchange for Blue and he is the enemy of Bryce "Blue" Westbrook, who was chosen by Baltimore as the number 1 draft pick. This allowed Derwin to be with Melanie, who is in Baltimore doing her Residency. The trade, however, was not planned by Derwin, but executed by the team owner because Derwin was responsible for the injury of former teammate and quarterback Kwan Kirkland. In the series finale of season 9, Derwin made an appearance with a pregnant Melanie; as the episode closes, it's shown that they've had a baby boy and girl. He did not appear in seasons 7 and 8.
- Wendy Raquel Robinson as Tasha Mack - Tasha is the brash, bold, and flamboyant mother of Malik Wright and begins the series as his manager. Malik, giving his mother an ultimatum at one point, eventually fires Tasha. Tasha then builds her own management company, Tasha Mack Management. She dissolves the company, however, to join Irv Smiff Management (ISM). In season three, she falls in love with former NBA player Rick Fox, who also works for ISM. Tasha ends up getting fired from ISM, and dumps Rick in the aftermath, assuming that he knew all about Irv Smith's plans to fire her. In the season three finale, Kelly Pitts and Tasha have a falling-out when Kelly discovers that Tasha set her then ex-husband, Jason Pitts, with his then new girlfriend, Camille. The altercation soon turns physical, with Kelly punching Tasha. Season four started with Tasha as Derwin's agent. She had also begun dating a much younger man named Donté (played by former 106 & Park host Terrence J). In season 5, Tasha decided to be celibate after a brief romance with a male escort (Carl Anthony Payne). She eventually falls for her longtime friend Pookie (Rockmond Dunbar). In the season 5 finale, her ex-boyfriend Rick Fox returns. In season 6, she appoints herself Sunbeams president due to Jaz arguing with everybody with Tasha and Keira and Chardonnay. At the end of season 7, after breaking up with Pookie (upon Pookie finding out about her affairs with Rick) and later with Rick, she becomes pregnant and delivers a baby girl by Pookie. In the series finale, after revealing the feelings they still had for each other, Tasha and Pookie decided to be together and happily moved into their own house with their baby daughter.
- Hosea Chanchez as Malik Wright – Malik Wright is the San Diego Sabers superstar quarterback and the son of Tasha Mack. Arrogant and cocky, Malik begins the series as an immature womanizer. He falls in love with actress Robin Givens and convinces her to marry him as a publicity stunt. In the beginning, he lived with his mom but eventually gets his own place for the purpose of being able to party every night. He also fired his mom in season 2. In season 3, he finally meets his father and his half-sister, Pucci, whom he tries to help with her singing career. In season 4, Malik is still a cocky, spoiled playboy who is sleeping with the wife of the Sabers' new owner (guest star Meagan Good). Malik gets incarcerated for assaulting a cop and DUI and goes to rehab to solve his newfound problems. In rehab, he falls for a troubled supermodel Jenna Rice (Tika Sumpter). In season 5, Malik has financial issues and is forced to sell his multimillion-dollar mansion and his cars. The season 5 finale, Malik ends his relationship with Jenna. He seemed to be getting his life together, but then had converted back to his old ways. During the season 6 finale, after Malik lands in the hospital from being beat up by a group of men, he learns he won't have full use of his football arm anymore. In season 7, Malik goes through physical therapy in hopes of getting back into American football and falls for his previously lesbian physical therapist Yanna. In the season 7 finale, Malik ends his relationship with Yanna. In season 8, Malik rejoins the Sabers, but loses his position as team captain to Blue. In the season 8 finale, he and Keira admit their feelings about each other (after being best friends for a long time). In the beginning of season 9, Malik and Keira are in a relationship as he and Blue began feuding, and he becomes the laughingstock of the team. Then, in the next to last episode, Malik breaks up with Keira after realizing he wasn't truly in love with her the way he was with Yanna. (Malik determined this after realizing he wasn't crying after having sex with Keira like he did with Yanna, something he had never felt before then.) Keira responds by slapping him. In the series finale, Malik leads the team to the playoffs, he proposes to Keira (who declines), he had plans to retire, but he continues to play, winning another championship with the Sabers.
- Brittany Daniel as Kelly Pitts (seasons 1–3 and 9; recurring seasons 4 and 7–8) – Kelly Pitts is the wife of Jason Pitts, mother of Brittany Pitts, and former President of the Sunbeams. After their relationship gradually becomes more and more strained in season 2, Kelly and Jason divorce at the beginning of season three. At the start of season 4, it is revealed that Kelly is now a reality TV star, with her own show centered around the ex-wives of professional athletes. Her character was bumped down to recurring in season 4, and her character was effectively written out of the show in season 4 after she stated to Jason that she needed to head back home to her parents to find herself again. Daniel had made no further appearances in the series after that season. But in season 6, Kelly is heavily mentioned by the remaining characters (especially Tasha). After being referred to a therapist by Kelly, Tasha reveals that Kelly has since moved to Paris. She made her return in season 7. She comes to Chardonnay and Jason's wedding where Jason reveals he still loves her, ending the wedding. She and Jason get remarried in season 9.
- Coby Bell as Jason Pitts (seasons 1–3 and 6–9; recurring seasons 4–5) – Jason is a San Diego Sabers former team captain and superstar wide receiver, later its head coach. He is the husband of Kelly Pitts, although they divorced in season 3. Jason and Kelly have one child, Brittany Pitts. In season 2, realizing that his skills were visibly diminishing, Jason starts using steroids to boost his performance. The Sabers win the championship that year. But once Kelly finds out about his steroid use it puts a strain on their relationship, leading to their divorce in season 3. Jason had a girlfriend briefly in season 3 (guest star Stacey Dash); however, he is single at the beginning of season 4. Jason is officially cut from the Sabers in season 4, and he becomes a correspondent on Benched, a sports news television series hosted by former NBA basketball player Chris Webber. In season 5, he is a correspondent on his own show, The Pitts Stop, and is in a romantic relationship with girlfriend-wife Chardonnay (portrayed by Brandy Norwood). In season 6, Jason makes an attempt at a comeback but suffered a concussion, affecting his playing ability among other things as well. He retires for good at the beginning of season 7. In season 7, Kelly returns and attends the wedding of Chardonnay and Jason (at Chardonnay's request). Jason does not marry Chardonnay, admitting he is still in love with Kelly. In season 8, Jason courts Kelly again (despite her initial reluctance) and is also named interim head coach of the Sabers. He and Kelly remarry in season 9.
- Brandy Norwood as Chardonnay Pitts (seasons 6–9; recurring season 5) – Chardonnay Pitts is the ex-wife of Jason Pitts. She and Jason meet when he goes to the bar where she bartends. She refuses to serve Jason, who tells her boss and gets her fired. Feeling bad after he got her fired, Jason takes her on a date. They wind up in Tijuana. Jason gets drunk and Chardonnay tricks him into marrying her to see if he really loves black women. They return to San Diego and decide to get their marriage annulled. In the season 5 finale, Chardonnay and Jason decide not to go through with the annulment and stay married. Though they have their ups and downs, everything seems fine between the two until Kelly shows up in season 7. Kelly pays off Ty Savage (Jason's former teammate) to stop him from revealing Jason's steroid use. This upsets Chardonnay to the point that she kicks Jason out of the house. She lets him back in and despite his reveal that he kissed Kelly after visiting her in a hotel, they still plan to get married. But in the season 7 finale, Jason doesn't go through with the wedding, revealing he's still in love with Kelly. Chardonnay slaps Jason and storms off, beside herself. At the beginning of season 8 she goes back to Fresno, saying to Tasha there is nothing left but bad memories in San Diego.
- Lauren London as Keira Michelle Whitaker (seasons 6–9) – Keira is a former child star who starred in a fictional Cosby-esque sitcom called Stuck Together. She is struggling to make the transition from child star to adult. Keira is introduced in season 6. Her character does not replace Melanie, but is a new character. Her love interest is Bryce "Blue" Westbrook. The two meet at a party where they hook up. After being shut down by Keira, Blue hooks up with Keira's friend, singer Ciara, making Keira jealous. Blue and Keira try to ignore and anger each other at first, then become cordial, then fall for each other. After Keira loses her virginity to Blue, however, they break up due to Blue's insensitivity. They still have feelings for each other even while Keira briefly dates an actor named Luke, with whom she has a rather raunchy sex scene in her movie 'Baggers', that she didn't want Blue to see at the premiere. (He sees it from the back.) They break up again. After more ups and downs in season 7, they elope in that season's finale after Blue proposes, skipping Jason and Chardonnay's wedding. In season 8, after being told by several people that she needs to dedicate herself to her craft, she kisses Malik at an audition after being made to by the acting coach, leading to deeper feelings between the two, who were just best friends before. Blue catches on and breaks off the engagement in season 9 after a huge fight between him and Malik in an elevator. Keira ends up with Malik, at the disapproval of Tasha. In the series finale, after Malik breaks up with Keira, she sleeps with Blue once more, refuses Malik's proposal, and decides to focus on her career. She gets her breakout role.
- Jay Ellis as Bryce "Blueprint" Westbrook (seasons 6–9) – Bryce is a San Diego Sabers wide receiver and the first overall draft pick from Stanford who is highly educated and often the smartest person in the room. Even though he is bright and talented, he is still a young man who has a lot to learn about life, love and himself. Blue is one of the new characters that was introduced in season 6. His character replaces Derwin Davis as a main character. Blue was traded from Baltimore to San Diego in exchange for Derwin. The two men confront each other at a post-draft party and brawl. That same night, he pursues Keira for the first time. They start an on-again, off-again relationship throughout the series. Though Blue had his moments where he attempts to act out against Keira when the two weren't together by using women to make her jealous (sleeping with Ciara, bringing her to a group photoshoot, and the party bus episode all in season 6, having an escort with him in the season 7 premiere, having a woman with him in season 9 as he calls off their engagement), he obviously still loves Keira. In season 7, Jason chastises Blue for not being focused due to his off-the-field distractions. Blue takes initiative and eventually becomes team captain in season 8. In season 9, he led a protest against Saber management that cost him a couple of games, though the Sabers would eventually win the championship in the series finale.

=== Current recurring cast ===
- Barry Floyd as Terrence "Tee-Tee" Carter - Malik's childhood friend, former assistant, and owner of Tee Tee's Cluck Truck, he was appeared in every season, along with Malik, Jason and Tasha.
- Rockmond Dunbar as Pookie - Ex-con; Tasha's old friend and eventual love interest. He is the father of Tasha's newborn baby. It is revealed his real name is Marion.

=== Previous recurring cast ===
- P. J. Byrne as Irv Smiff - Owner of Irv Smiff Management (ISM). (Seasons 1–3, 5, 9)
- Bumper Robinson as Juvon Glenn - San Diego Sabers' Running Back and husband of Jazz. (Seasons 1–6, 8-9)
- Shanti Lowry as Dionne Marie Taylor - Derwin's former publicist and Melanie's previous roommate. (Seasons 1–3, 8)
- Gregory Alan Williams as Dr. James Barnett - Melanie's father. (Seasons 1, 3–4)
- Claudette Roche as Grace Barnett - Melanie's mother. (Seasons 1, 3–4)
- Tahj Mowry as Cameron Barnett - Melanie's brother. (Seasons 1 & 3)
- Drew Sidora as herself — singer; Derwin's brief love interest. (Seasons 1–2)
- Rocky Carroll as Kenny "Coach T" Taylor - offensive coordinator of the San Diego Sabers; Tasha's brief love interest. (Seasons 1–2)
- Caryn Ward as Erica Harrison (Seasons 1–4, 8)
- Kendra C. Johnson as Renee Royce - TV personality and one of Malik's love interests. (Seasons 1–2)
- Chaz Lamar Shepherd as Trey Wiggs - Melanie's college friend and father of Melanie's aborted baby. (Seasons 1–2, 5)
- Rick Fox as himself — former NBA basketball player; Tasha's co-worker and eventual love interest. (Seasons 2–3, 5–6, 9)
- Robin Givens as herself — actress; Malik's ex-wife. (Seasons 2–3)
- Tae Heckard as Jasmine "Jazz" - the former Sunbeams President and Wife of San Diego Sabers' Running Back Juvon (Seasons 2—6, 8–9)
- Gabrielle Dennis as Janay Brice - Derwin's ex-girlfriend and mother of his son. In season 5, it was revealed that she is engaged to a man named Noah and decided to take her son DJ and move to New York with her fiancé. (Seasons 2–5)
- Lee Majors as Coach Ross - coach of the San Diego Sabers. (Seasons 2–3)
- Mehcad Brooks as Jerome - Melanie's ex-boyfriend. (Seasons 2–3)
- Jason Olive as McHottie - Melanie's love interest in medical school. (Seasons 3 & 5)
- Michael Boatman as Lawrence Chauncey Wright - Malik's father. (Season 3)
- Lisa Tucker as Pucci Wright - Malik's half-sister. (Season 3)
- Stacey Dash as Camille Rose - Jason's ex-girlfriend. (Seasons 3–4)
- Michael Beach as Roger Keith - Owner of San Diego Sabers. (Seasons 4–6, 8–9)
- Terrence Jenkins as Donté - the younger ex-boyfriend of Tasha. (Season 4)
- Chris Webber as himself — former NBA basketball player; Jason's co-host on the sports news television series Benched. (Season 4)
- Tika Sumpter as Jenna Rice - Super Model; Malik met Jenna in Rehab; later Malik's love interest. (Seasons 4–5)
- Meagan Good as Parker Keith - The wife of Roger Keith; had an affair with Malik. (Season 4)
- Jigga as Bibs - Malik's bodyguard. (Seasons 4–9)
- Isley Anderson as D.J. - Derwin and Janay's son (Seasons 4–5, 9)
- Charles Michael Davis as Kwan Kirkland - the San Diego Saber's former quarterback. (Seasons 4–5)
- Janet Varney as Summer Grayson - co-host of The Pitts Stop. (Season 5)
- Ciara as Herself — singer; friend of Keira; she hooked up with Blue. (Season 6)
- Candice Patton as Tori - Malik's personal assistant. (Seasons 6–7)
- LaMonica Garrett as Luke Rogers (Season 6)
- Miranda Rae Mayo as Patreece Sheibani (Season 6)
- Carissa Capobianco as Nina - Malik's girlfriend; friend of Keira. (Seasons 6–7, 9)
- Hayley Marie Norman as Bianca (Season 6)
- Danielle Nicolet as Yana - A physical therapist who agrees to help Malik recuperate from his injured arm. (Seasons 7–9)
- Andra Fuller as Roger Keith Jr. - The son of Sabers owner Roger Keith. (Seasons 8–9)
- Richard Gant as Walter Mack - Tasha Mack's father, Malik's Grandfather (Seasons 6-7, 9)

=== Special guest appearances ===
- Jared Allen
- Tichina Arnold
- Nnamdi Asomugha
- Rob Base
- Garcelle Beauvais
- Chico Benymon
- Derek Blanks
- Tisha Campbell
- Chamillionaire
- Morris Chestnut
- Terry Crews
- Loretta Devine
- Dustin Diamond
- Christopher B. Duncan
- Earthquake
- Selita Ebanks
- Raymond Edwards Jr.
- David Eigenberg
- Carmen Electra
- Estelle
- Eve
- Faith Evans
- Fabolous
- Melyssa Ford
- Scott Michael Foster
- Vivica A. Fox
- Andy Allo
- Tomiko Fraser
- Kevin Frazier
- Rudy Gay
- Cuba Gooding, Jr.
- Kelsey Grammer
- Tiffany Haddish
- Irma P. Hall
- Regina Hall
- Cory Hardrict
- Hill Harper
- Napoleon Harris
- Jamie Hector
- Jim Hill
- Djimon Hounsou
- Daymond John
- Magic Johnson
- Shawn Johnson
- Mike Jones
- Leslie Jordan
- Gayle King
- Solange Knowles
- Queen Latifah
- Martin Lawrence
- NeNe Leakes
- Lisa Leslie
- LisaRaye
- Lil Scrappy
- Lil' Kim
- Nia Long
- Eva Marcille
- Shawn Marion
- Penny Marshall
- Duane Martin
- Darius McCrary
- Willie McGinest
- Lonette McKee
- Romeo Miller
- Daryl Mitchell
- Kel Mitchell
- Mo'Nique
- Tahj Mowry
- Bria Murphy
- Musiq
- Navid Negahban
- Elimu Nelson
- Chad Ochocinco
- Terrell Owens
- Keke Palmer
- Carl Anthony Payne II
- Mario Van Peebles
- Shaun Phillips
- Eyal Podell
- Kyla Pratt
- Reagan Gomez-Preston
- Jerry Rice
- Charlie Robinson
- Jalen Rose
- Kelly Rowland
- Ja Rule
- Ephraim Salaam
- Drew Sidora
- John Singleton
- Kenny Smith
- Tasha Smith
- Soulja Boy
- Keith Sweat
- Nick Swisher
- Raven-Symoné
- Kenan Thompson
- Too Short
- Lisa Tucker
- Michael Twombley
- Gabrielle Union
- Chris Webber
- Serena Williams
- Stevie Williams
- Tyler James Williams
- Vanessa L. Williams
- Kellen Winslow II
- Jaleel White
- Shereé Whitfield
- William Allen Young
- Jolee Alexander
- Jason Momoa
- Destine' Parker

== Production ==
=== 2021 revival series ===
In May 2021, it was announced that Paramount+ had ordered a revival of the series, with the setting relocated to Las Vegas. Hosea Chanchez, Coby Bell, Brandy, Brittany Daniel, Pooch Hall and Wendy Raquel Robinson were in talks to reprise their roles as Malik Wright, Jason Pitts, Chardonnay Pitts, Kelly Pitts, Derwin Davis and Tasha Mack.

Joining the returning cast was Vaughn W. Hebron as "Jamison Fields", an undrafted free agent; Adriyan Rae as "Brittany Pitts", Jason and Kelly Pitts' daughter (previously portrayed by Katlynn Simone); and Analisa Velez as "Raquel Navarro", Brittany’s best friend. Tia Mowry-Hardrict, who was cast in Netflix's Family Reunion, made a TikTok video expressing that she will most likely not return to her two roles of Sister, Sister and The Game. While being honored at the Ebony 'Power 100', she was interviewed by Entertainment Tonight, saying: “As it stands for right now, we aren’t in any talks or communication about me coming back to the show...I know it seems kind of weird, because I’m like, the only one, but you know, Melanie, I loved playing that character, and if everything works out, and if everything works out the way that it should, then who knows? I might be on the show.”

=== U.S. ratings ===
Seasonal ratings based on average total viewers per episode of the series. The fourth-season premiere drew 7.7 million viewers, which was a record for a scripted premiere on BET.

Season	Network	Timeslot (ET)	Season premiere	Viewers (in millions)	18-49 rating	Season finale	Viewers (in millions)	18-49 rating	TV season	Rank	Viewers (in millions)
1	The CW	Sunday 8:30 p.m. (2006) Monday 9:30 p.m. (2006–2007)	October 1, 2006	2.60		May 14, 2007	2.51	0.9	2006–2007	#141	2.33
2	The CW	Monday 9:30 p.m. (2007–2008) Sunday 9:00 p.m. (2008)	October 1, 2007	2.98	1.4	May 18, 2008	1.62	0.8	2007–2008	#196	2.35
3	The CW	Friday 8:30 p.m. (2008–2009)	October 3, 2008	1.95		May 15, 2009	1.78	1.2	2008–2009	#174	1.75
4	BET	Tuesday 10:00 p.m. (2011)	January 11, 2011	7.68	3.6	March 29, 2011	4.43	2.2	2010-2011	—N/a	4.53
5	BET	Tuesday 10:00 p.m. (2012)	January 10, 2012	5.28	2.8	June 5, 2012	2.49	1.3	2011-2012	—N/a	2.69
6	BET	Tuesday 10:00 p.m. (2013)	March 26, 2013	2.54	1.2	September 3, 2013	3.77	1.9	2012-2013	—N/a	3.35
7	BET	Tuesday 10:00 p.m. (2014)	March 4, 2014	3.35	1.6	April 29, 2014	2.53	1.2	2013-2014	—N/a	3.35
8	BET	Wednesday 10:00 p.m. (2014)	January 14, 2015	3.13	1.1	March 4, 2015			2015 -	—N/a	TBA
9	BET	Wednesday 10:00 p.m. (2015)	June 3, 2015			August 5, 2015					

The series is marketed and rebranded as a fresh new season on Paramount+, beginning the new inception as season 1.

=== Lawsuit ===
In September 2006, writer Staci Robinson filed a $40 million lawsuit against the CW, CBS, Warner Bros., and Grammnet Productions for copyright infringement. Robinson claimed that she had applied for a job as writer's assistant in 2005 with series creator and executive producer Mara Brock Akil, to whom Robinson had subsequently sent her novel, Interceptions. The novel is about a woman who puts her goal of becoming a lawyer on hold to follow her boyfriend as he pursues a career as a professional American football player. After receiving the novel, Robinson was interviewed for the job but later declined the position. Robinson alleged that Akil and a CW screenwriter stole the idea from her novel to create the series. The suit was settled out of court under a non-disclosure agreement in September 2007.

== Awards and nominations ==
Year	Award	Result	Category	Recipient
2007	NAACP Image Awards	Nominated	Outstanding Writing in a Comedy Series	Kenny Smith, Jr. (for "The Trey Wiggs Episode")
2008	NAACP Image Awards	Nominated	Outstanding Writing in a Comedy Series	Sara V. Finney (for "The Big Chill" episode)
2008	NAACP Image Awards	Nominated	Outstanding Supporting Actress in a Comedy Series	Wendy Raquel Robinson
2008	NAACP Image Awards	Nominated	Outstanding Actress in a Comedy Series	Tia Mowry
2009	NAACP Image Awards	Nominated	Outstanding Supporting Actress in a Comedy Series	Wendy Raquel Robinson
2009	NAACP Image Awards	Nominated	Outstanding Comedy Series	–
2009	NAACP Image Awards	Nominated	Outstanding Actress in a Comedy Series	Tia Mowry
2009	NAACP Image Awards	Won	Outstanding Writing in a Comedy Series	Erica Montolfo (for episode "White Coats and White Lies")
2014	NAACP Image Awards	Won	Outstanding Supporting Actress in a Comedy Series	Brandy Norwood
2009	NAMIC Vision Awards	Nominated	Comedy	–
2007	Teen Choice Awards	Nominated	Choice TV Actress: Comedy	Tia Mowry

== DVD releases ==
Season releases

The First Season
Set details	Special features
22 episodes; 3-disc set; N/A Aspect Ratio; N/A Mins; Languages: English (Dolby Digital 2.0 Surround)	Includes the backdoor pilot episode from Girlfriends (The Game - Press Release Gives The Game Plan for The 1st Season on DVD); Rift and Separate; Interview with Mara Brock Akil; To Baby...Or Not to Baby; Commentary with Mara Brock Akil; The Iceman Cometh; Commentary with Mara Brock Akil; All-Star Blues; Commentary with Mara Brock Akil; When the Chickens Comes to Roost (Parts 1 & 2); Offseason interview with Mara Brock Akil
Release date	Includes the backdoor pilot episode from Girlfriends (The Game - Press Release Gives The Game Plan for The 1st Season on DVD); Rift and Separate; Interview with Mara Brock Akil; To Baby...Or Not to Baby; Commentary with Mara Brock Akil; The Iceman Cometh; Commentary with Mara Brock Akil; All-Star Blues; Commentary with Mara Brock Akil; When the Chickens Comes to Roost (Parts 1 & 2); Offseason interview with Mara Brock Akil
United States (Region 1)	Includes the backdoor pilot episode from Girlfriends (The Game - Press Release Gives The Game Plan for The 1st Season on DVD); Rift and Separate; Interview with Mara Brock Akil; To Baby...Or Not to Baby; Commentary with Mara Brock Akil; The Iceman Cometh; Commentary with Mara Brock Akil; All-Star Blues; Commentary with Mara Brock Akil; When the Chickens Comes to Roost (Parts 1 & 2); Offseason interview with Mara Brock Akil
September 1, 2009	Includes the backdoor pilot episode from Girlfriends (The Game - Press Release Gives The Game Plan for The 1st Season on DVD); Rift and Separate; Interview with Mara Brock Akil; To Baby...Or Not to Baby; Commentary with Mara Brock Akil; The Iceman Cometh; Commentary with Mara Brock Akil; All-Star Blues; Commentary with Mara Brock Akil; When the Chickens Comes to Roost (Parts 1 & 2); Offseason interview with Mara Brock Akil
