= List of Girlfriends episodes =

Girlfriends is an American situation comedy. The series was on UPN for its first six seasons and was on The CW for its final two seasons, running for a total of 172 episodes, spanning eight seasons. Girlfriends premiered on September 11, 2000, and aired its final episode on February 11, 2008.

== Series overview ==
Season	Episodes	Originally released			Rank	Average viewership (in millions)
Season	Episodes	First released	Last released	Network	Rank	Average viewership (in millions)
1	22	September 11, 2000	May 14, 2001	UPN	No. 136	3.2
2	22	September 10, 2001	May 20, 2002	UPN	No. 129	4.2
3	25	September 23, 2002	May 19, 2003	UPN	No. 133	4.1
4	24	September 15, 2003	May 24, 2004	UPN	No. 128	3.6
5	22	September 20, 2004	May 23, 2005	UPN	No. 130	3.61
6	22	September 19, 2005	May 8, 2006	UPN	No. 135	3.4
7	22	October 1, 2006	May 7, 2007	The CW	No. 138	2.5
8	13	October 1, 2007	February 11, 2008	The CW	No. 150	2.1

== Episodes ==
=== Pilot (1999) ===
Title	Directed by	Written by	Original release date
"Pilot"	Leonard R. Garner Jr.	Kim Collier	UNAIRED
Joan Clayton (Tracee Ellis Ross) is at the great peak of her life. She is almost 30 years old, is almost junior partner at her law firm, and has a great friend circle. She hires a woman named Maya Wilkes (Golden Brooks) as her assistant, and has had a friendship with one of her colleagues, William (Reggie Hayes), for over three months. But Joan is going crazy that she hasn't had a man for a year and her plan was to be married by now. Her friends, egotistical Toni Childs (Leslie Silva) and lazy, 27-year-old college student named Lynn (Christina Cox), have to cheer Joan up and get her a man, with the help of Maya whom Toni calls "ghetto". Notes: Lynn and Toni were initially played by Christina Cox and Leslie Silva before being replaced by Persia White and Jill Marie Jones in the final-cut series. The theme and transition music was also initially set to Lauryn Hill. Due to licensing issues with Sony Music, Hill replaced by Angie Stone in the final-cut series.

=== Season 1 (2000–01) ===
No. overall	No. in season	Title	Directed by	Written by	Original release date	Prod. code	U.S. viewers (millions)
1	1	"Toe Sucking"	Leonard R. Garner Jr.	Mara Brock Akil	September 11, 2000	40338-001	4.87
Joan Clayton, a successful attorney, prepares to celebrate her 29th birthday (although she claims to be 26 to make her achievements seem more impressive). Toni, Joan's best friend, begins dating Charles (Jason George), a venture capitalist with a propensity for toe-sucking who dated Joan until he freaked out at the prospect of marriage. Toni tries to hide the truth, but their friend Lynn forces her to confess to Joan. Joan claims she has no problem with Toni bringing Charles to her birthday party; but then brings her friend and colleague, William, to try to make him jealous. Joan is furious to learn that Charles is now interested in settling down, and the evening comes to a screeching halt. Meanwhile, Toni constantly clashes with Maya, Joan's assistant.
2	2	"One Night Stand?"	Leonard R. Garner Jr.	Mara Brock Akil	September 18, 2000	40338-002	4.00
After Joan reveals that she hasn't had sex in a year, her friends push her to go for a one-night stand. Joan is reluctant because she generally doesn't sleep with anyone until she has been in a relationship for three months, but tries to make a move on Davis Hamilton (Randy J. Goodwin), a handsome man who owns the restaurant the girls frequent. She convinces Davis to drive her home and makes a pass at him, only to learn that he is engaged. Although nothing happens between them, Joan tells Toni and Lynn that she slept with him. When the girls blab the news around town, Davis' fiancée dumps him, leaving Joan to struggle for a way to clean up the mess.
3	3	"Girlfrenzy"	Erma Elzy-Jones	Bernadette Luckett Strzeminski	September 25, 2000	40338-005	4.81
Toni and Maya get into another argument before an evening out, in part because Toni refuses to believe that Maya can get the girls into an exclusive club. Toni tries to gain admission to the club and fails. Maya shows up and easily gets herself, Joan, Lynn and William past the doorman. Joan convinces the reluctant Maya to also get Toni into the club. When the doorman waves to Toni, another woman believes the wave was meant for her, and they get into an argument. Joan tries to play peacemaker, but the situation turns into a brawl. Maya and Lynn jump into the fight, but Toni is hurt by the fact that Joan fails to back her up. She begins to question their friendship, so Joan searches for a way to patch things up.
4	4	"Hip-Ocracy"	Leonard R. Garner Jr.	Regina Y. Hicks	October 2, 2000	40338-003	3.61
Joan, Toni and Lynn set up dates with men they met over the Internet. Lynn's guy never shows up (his parole was denied), while Toni rejects hers because his skin is too dark. Although conspiracy theorist Maya warns that he will turn out to be a serial killer, Joan is pleased with her date, Marcus. Joan freaks out after discovering that Marcus wears a girdle because he has large hips, prompting Toni (who had taken heat from the girls over her treatment of her date) to take her to task for her behavior. Meanwhile, William also uses the Internet in an attempt to find love. He finally gets a date, but the woman seems to be completely crazy.
5	5	"I Pity the Fool"	Leonard R. Garner Jr.	Marcy Gray Rubin & David Silverman	October 9, 2000	40338-004	3.13
Joan grows tired of the clingy Marcus and plans to break up with him, but only winds up complicating the situation by having "pity sex" with him. The girls try to help her out by bombarding Marcus with negative facts about Joan in the hopes that he will dump her. Meanwhile, Maya gets involved in a get-rich-quick scheme.
6	6	"The Remains of the Date"	Leonard R. Garner Jr.	Tim Edwards	October 30, 2000	40338-009	3.87
Joan plans an elaborate scheme to get revenge on William for the latest in a series of Halloween pranks. Toni is put off when her date asks her to engage in a threesome--with a stuffed animal.
7	7	"Everything Fishy Ain't Fish"	Sheldon Epps	Beverly D. Hunter	November 6, 2000	40338-007	3.23
Joan sees Maya's husband, Darnell, in a possibly compromising situation with another woman. Her gut tells her that something may be going on, but she agonizes over whether to share this information with Maya. Meanwhile, Toni begins dating a white city councilman who is also running for mayor. He becomes fascinated with her hair after she reveals that she wears a weave.
8	8	"Pregnant Pause"	Sheldon Epps	Regina Y. Hicks	November 13, 2000	40338-011	3.35
Joan turns to her friends for support when she fears that she might be pregnant. When a test turns out positive, she tries to cope with her fears about impending motherhood. Meanwhile, Lynn recalls memories of her "white" childhood after receiving a box of belongings from her mother.
9	9	"Fried Turkey"	Leonard R. Garner Jr.	Mark Alton Brown & Dee LaDuke	November 20, 2000	40338-010	3.31
Joan finds herself alone on Thanksgiving after everyone makes other plans for the holiday. After dining at 847, she meets Davis's friend Preston Hall, a handsome and highly successful attorney. Joan invites him back to her place for a home-cooked meal before he has to leave on the red-eye, but her friends suddenly begin appearing and she can't seem to get them to leave.
10	10	"Never a Bridesmaid"	Sheldon Epps	Temi Akinyemi	November 27, 2000	40338-008	3.27
Maya and Darnell plan to renew their wedding vows, and Joan agrees to hold the event at her house. However, Joan constantly disagrees with Maya's choices and tries to mold the event into her own dream wedding. Maya tells Joan that she no longer wants her to be a bridesmaid, and later rebuffs her apology and takes her to task for constantly looking down on Maya. Meanwhile, Toni grows concerned by the tendency for black men to marry outside of their race. She determines that she and Lynn must do what they can to bring William "back to the fold".
11	11	"The Importance of Being Frank"	Sheldon Epps	Michael B. Kaplan	December 11, 2000	40338-006	3.79
Joan begins dating a client, Frank Anderson. Everything seems to be going well until a crazed woman shows up at the office looking for Joan. She tells Maya and Lynn that she trailed her husband to Joan's house. Joan angrily breaks up with Frank in public. She later learns that Toni has been using her house to rendezvous with her married boyfriend and assumes that she was wrong to suspect Frank of wrongdoing. However, Toni's boyfriend soon delivers some surprising news that sheds new light on the situation.
12	12	"The List"	Sheldon Epps	Story by : Michael B. Kaplan & Lisa Michelle Payton; Teleplay by : Michael B. Kaplan	January 15, 2001	40338-012	2.68
The girls and William make lists of the qualities they want in their ideal partners. When everyone goes to an art gallery, Joan is amazed to find a man who meets all of her qualifications, but her friends later warn her that she may have frightened him with her aggressiveness. At the same gallery, Toni runs into an ex-flame who is tending bar; and William has another meeting with possibly unstable cop Yvonne and considers giving her a try. Lynn, meanwhile, becomes obsessed with a painting of a red triangle.
13	13	"They've Gotta Have It"	Henry Chan	Mara Brock Akil	February 5, 2001	40338-013	3.34
Joan grows impatient with Sean, who refuses to kiss or touch her. After discussing a number of possible explanations with her friends, she finally pushes Sean for the reason behind his cold behavior. Joan is taken aback when he confesses to being a sex addict. Meanwhile, Toni annoys Greg with her refusal to make a commitment to him; and Yvonne angers William by sharing a few too many intimate details about their love life with Maya.
14	14	"Bad Timing"	Tony Singletary	Bernadette Luckett Strzeminski	February 12, 2001	40338-014	3.58
Joan is upset when Sean must go out of town for Valentine's Day. Her frustration grows when she is unable to get in touch with him. Davis, who has recently reunited with his fiancée, stuns Joan by kissing her and offering to end his relationship to be with her. Maya, Toni and William spend the day with their significant others, and William frets about finding a card that doesn't send too strong a sentiment. Lynn volunteers for a suicide hotline and makes a date with one of the callers.
15	15	"Old Dog"	Sheldon Epps	Marcy Gray Rubin & David Silverman	February 19, 2001	40338-015	2.94
Joan decides to waive her "three-month rule" and sleep with Sean, but finds that the results are extremely disappointing. She seeks her friends' advice on how to help Sean improve his performance. Maya, with help from Toni, seeks medical attention after she and Darnell have difficulty conceiving a second child. William keeps having the misfortune of approaching every time Maya is discussing her gynecological situation with one of her friends.
16	16	"Friends, Colleagues, Brothers"	Sheldon Epps	Temi Akinyemi	February 26, 2001	40338-017	3.14
Joan becomes fed up with the "boys' club" mentality at work, as her opinions are ignored and she is passed over for important cases. When she believes that William has deliberately stolen her idea, she blows up at him in front of everyone, leading to a rift between them. Meanwhile, Maya discovers that Toni and Lynn's yoga instructor is a little too "hands-on" in his approach toward his students.
17	17	"The Declaration of Lynndependence"	Ken Whittingham	Tim Edwards	March 5, 2001	40338-016	3.56
After discovering that Lynn has applied for yet another grad school program, Joan and Toni determine that they must end their financial support and force her to get a job and go out into the real world. However, Joan has difficulty completely cutting Lynn off, leading Toni to conclude that Joan is an "enabler." Meanwhile, William encourages Yvonne to hang out with the girls so that he can have time with his guy friends; and Maya suffers from the side effects of hormone therapy.
18	18	"Diss-regard"	Sheldon Epps	Regina Y. Hicks	March 12, 2001	40338-018	3.19
Maya checks into the hospital to undergo surgery for the removal of a fibroid tumor. Joan's friends (especially Lynn) question her priorities when she decides to leave Maya's bedside to attend an important business dinner with Sean. Toni continues to clash with Greg over his lack of income. At the hospital, she takes an immediate interest in Maya's doctor, the wealthy and handsome Dr. Clay Spencer.
19	19	"A Kiss Before Lying"	Sheldon Epps	Michael B. Kaplan	April 16, 2001	40338-020	2.63
Sean grows uncomfortable with Joan's relationship with Davis, as he feels that she flirts with him too much. After she confesses that they once shared a kiss, Sean upsets Joan by ordering her to stay away from Davis and 847 for good. Meanwhile, Toni angers Greg by displaying some of his paintings at the restaurant; and Darnell becomes impatient when Maya is reluctant to resume sexual relations with him after her surgery.
20	20	"The Burning Vagina Monologues"	Ken Whittingham	Story by : Michele Marburger & Judy Dent; Teleplay by : Kevin Marburger & Judy Dent	April 30, 2001	40338-019	3.30
Toni cheats on Greg with Clay and winds up contracting chlamydia. Joan frets about the fact that Sean has yet to tell her that he loves her, especially after he reveals that he has been offered a six-month job in New York. She seeks her friends' advice on how to coax a love declaration from him. Meanwhile, Maya feels threatened by the temp who filled in as Joan's assistant during her absence.
21	21	"Loose Lips Sink Relationships"	Sheldon Epps	Mark Alton Brown & Dee LaDuke	May 7, 2001	40338-021	3.24
After Toni accepts Clay's marriage proposal, a disapproving Joan advises her to look into her heart, as she believes that Greg is the one she really loves. Toni comes to agree with her, and tells Clay that she cannot marry him. Unfortunately, in the meantime, Joan (unaware that Greg and Toni are even still together) accidentally tells Greg that Toni is engaged to another man, prompting him to dump her. Meanwhile, William issues an ultimatum to Yvonne after she is shot in the line of duty; and Maya continues to try to avoid having sex with Darnell.
22	22	"Jamaic-Up?"	Sheldon Epps	Mara Brock Akil	May 14, 2001	40338-022	3.27
Toni remains in a state of despair over her split with Greg, while a guilt-ridden Joan continues to keep her involvement in the break-up a secret. She confesses to Greg, who still wants nothing to do with Toni. William worries when Yvonne heads off to Jamaica to attend Sinbad's music festival. The girls decide to go to Jamaica as well, as Joan hopes that Toni will meet someone and get out of her funk. Sean and Joan argue, as he feels she should either confess the truth or mind her own business. Maya gets her groove back after a bikini wax, and Lynn falls in love with a bellhop and decides to stay in Jamaica. William shows up and surprises Yvonne with a marriage proposal. Toni hits it off with NFL star Terrell Davis and accepts his proposal, although she admits that she still loves Greg. Joan finally confesses that she told Greg about Toni's engagement to Clay, prompting Toni to attack her and storm off. Joan returns home to find Sean and Toni in a compromising position.

=== Season 2 (2001–02) ===
No. overall	No. in season	Title	Directed by	Written by	Original release date	Prod. code	U.S. viewers (millions)
23	1	"The Fallout"	Sheldon Epps	Mara Brock Akil	September 10, 2001	40338-023	5.14
Joan forgives Toni for slapping her in Jamaica and trying to seduce Sean, much to the shock and dismay of Maya and Lynn (who has returned from Jamaica). When Joan's hair begins to fall out due to stress, she sees a therapist, who recommends that she cut Toni out of her life for good. However, this proves difficult when Toni seeks Joan's shoulder to lean on after a setback at work. Meanwhile, Darnell is upset by Maya's bikini wax, and accuses her of changing as the result of her association with the girls.
24	2	"Just Say No"	Sheldon Epps	Mark Alton Brown & Dee LaDuke	September 17, 2001	40338-024	4.52
Joan lies to Dr. Bales about ending her relationship with Toni, but he runs into them having lunch together. Toni is furious to learn that Joan has been talking to a therapist about her, and orders Joan to end their sessions. Joan continues to keep her appointments, and Dr. Bales suggests that she be more assertive with her friends. Lynn's boyfriend, Vosco, arrives from Jamaica, and Lynn hides him in Joan's house. William suddenly becomes more attractive to women after becoming engaged. Maya is upset by his insistence on flirting with all of his new admirers.
25	3	"A Full Court Conspiracy"	Leonard R. Garner Jr.	Lamont Ferrell & Norman Vance Jr.	September 24, 2001	40338-025	4.26
Joan takes shots from her friends and is labeled a "sell-out" by the black community after she and William represent a beverage company suing a basketball star for accusing it of racism. Joan faces a larger moral dilemma after uncovering disturbing information about her client. Meanwhile, Lynn reluctantly takes a waitress job and moves with Vosco into a garage apartment managed by Maya's mother.
26	4	"Un-Treatable"	Sheldon Epps	Bernadette Luckett Strzeminski	October 1, 2001	40338-026	4.92
Darnell is upset with Maya for buying an expensive dress at her friends' behest, and again when she returns it. He sees this as a sign that she doesn't trust him to provide for her financially. Sean has difficulty battling his sex addiction. Joan tries to help him out over the phone, and ultimately flies to New York to see him. He says that having sex only a few times a month is too difficult for him in his condition, and asks her to move to New York. Joan cannot do this, so they break up. Yvonne finally placates William by quitting the police force.
27	5	"Buh-Bye"	Sheldon Epps	Regina Y. Hicks	October 8, 2001	40338-027	4.62
After learning that Toni has shared details of her private life (her break-up with Sean and his sex addiction) with her boss, Mr. Swedelson, a fed-up Joan ends their friendship. Toni, who has just been fired, continually pleads with her to re-consider. Meanwhile, Vosco frustrates Lynn by refusing to get a job.
28	6	"Willie or Wont He?"	Henry Chan	Michael B. Kaplan	October 15, 2001	40338-028	4.56
Yvonne panics when William seems hesitant to set a wedding date, as she fears that he is getting cold feet. A very reluctant Joan finds herself caught in the middle of the couple's relationship problems. After a chance meeting at a restaurant, Toni declares her love for Greg and manages to win him back. Lynn and Maya try to arrange a friendship between Darnell and Vosco in the hopes that their good qualities will rub off on each other.
29	7	"Trick or Truth"	Leonard R. Garner Jr.	Mara Brock Akil	October 29, 2001	40338-030	4.73
Toni suffers a breakdown after Greg cheats on her, then reveals that he only took her back so that he could get revenge against her. Lynn and Maya try to help her pick up the pieces, but Joan is less than sympathetic. Without Toni to round up male guests, William finds himself as the only man at Joan's Halloween party, and becomes overwhelmed by all of the female attention.
30	8	"Joan's Birthday Suit"	Henry Chan	Marcy Gray Rubin & David Silverman	November 5, 2001	40338-029	5.29
On her 30th birthday, Joan grows depressed at the realization that she hasn't had a lot of excitement in her life. She determines that she will live life to its fullest in her thirties, and demonstrates her new philosophy by taking her friends to a nude beach--where they run into her father. Meanwhile, William suggests a pre-nuptial agreement to Yvonne, and is surprised by her response.
31	9	"Maya Takes a Stan"	Ken Whittingham	Regina Y. Hicks	November 12, 2001	40338-031	4.7
Maya befriends Stan, a man she meets at the office and helps get a job. He encourages her aspirations to return to school. Maya initially tries to fix up Joan and Stan, but soon grows jealous. Toni joins a protest against a rapper in the hopes of winning God's approval. William searches desperately for a best man.
32	10	"Mom's the Word"	Sheldon Epps	Story by : Kevin G. Boyd & Bonita M. Alford; Teleplay by : Bonita M. Alford	November 19, 2001	40338-032	5.01
Joan hooks up with a famous actor at the bar, but her friends tease her about the fact that he will only give her his pager number. Joan manages to pry his home number from him, but panics when he doesn't immediately call her back, and makes the mistake of repeatedly calling his number to let her friends hear his answering machine message. Meanwhile, Toni begins dating a single father and grows surprisingly attached to his young daughter. Maya uses her friends as a cover so that she can spend time with her "friend" Stan. Lynn tries to avoid Vosco.
33	11	"You Better Watch Out"	Chip Hurd	Regina Y. Hicks	December 17, 2001	40338-033	4.53
Stan gives Maya an expensive watch for Christmas. Joan tells her to give it back to him, but she refuses. When Darnell sees the watch, Maya claims it is a gift from Joan, leaving him infuriated. Meanwhile, Vosco finally packs up and leaves for good after Lynn criticizes his Christmas present to her--a dog. William is excited about playing Santa for the office Christmas party, but experiences unexpected problems after getting a stain on the suit.
34	12	"I Have a Dream House"	Sheldon Epps	Tim Edwards	January 21, 2002	40338-034	3.91
Yvonne accuses William of trying to control her after he surprises her by buying a house for the two of them. Joan objects to the firm's policy regarding Martin Luther King Day, as they insist on remaining open for the day. She goes out of her way to try to change Swedelson's mind about the topic. Maya continues to spend time with Stan, and William warns her about what he sees as Stan's true intentions.
35	13	"Sister, Sistah"	Leonard R. Garner Jr.	Bernadette Luckett Strzeminski	February 4, 2002	40338-035	4.40
Lynn's sister Tanya comes to town to help celebrate the anniversary of Lynn's adoption. Tanya, who is white, has immersed herself in African-American culture. Maya quickly befriends Tanya, but Joan and Toni grow annoyed with her for acting "too black" and get into a confrontation with her. Maya and Lynn defend her, but Tanya later takes things too far at the salon. Meanwhile, Joan tries to organize William's bachelor party.
36	14	"Willie or Won't He II: The Last Chapter?"	Sheldon Epps	Michael B. Kaplan	February 11, 2002	40338-036	4.38
With the wedding rapidly approaching, Yvonne is stunned to learn that William hasn't even told his mother of her existence. He insists that she is too judgmental and would interfere. Yvonne forces William to call his mother, but she refuses to give her blessing and theorizes that William never told her about Yvonne because he doesn't really want to marry her. Yvonne calls off the wedding, and says she will only change her mind if William's mother agrees to come to the wedding. The girls try to convince her to re-consider, while William flies to Kansas City to talk to his mother.
37	15	"Can't Stan Ya!"	Mary Lou Belli	Lamont Ferrell & Norman Vance Jr.	February 25, 2002	40338-037	4.60
After an uncomfortable kiss, Maya realizes that she was wrong to get involved with Stan, and wants to stop seeing him. Stan, however, reveals that he has fallen head over heels, and refuses to give up on her. He seeks revenge by forming a friendship with Darnell and threatening to tell him about the affair. Meanwhile, William recuperates at Joan's house after being dumped by Yvonne.
38	16	"Take Me Out After the Ballgame"	Sheldon Epps	Regina Y. Hicks	March 4, 2002	40338-038	4.1
Joan is the subject of office gossip and jokes after she begins dating a younger man who works in the mail room. She is embarrassed by the attention, and winds up hurting Chris's feelings. William is upset when Chris usurps his spot as pitcher on the company softball team. Maya fears that the persistent Stan will expose their involvement to Darnell.
39	17	"Childs in Charge"	Leonard R. Garner Jr.	Karin Gist	March 18, 2002	40338-039	4.29
Toni plans to open her own real estate office, but Joan's efforts to encourage her to be practical wind up putting a damper on her enthusiasm. Toni accuses Joan of failing to support her dreams, although Joan insists that she just doesn't want her friend to get hurt. Meanwhile, Swedelson, disappointed by William's recent performance at work, encourages him to remedy what ails him by going on a "booty call."
40	18	"Taming of the Realtess"	Sheldon Epps	Kevin Marburger & Michele Marburger	March 25, 2002	40338-041	4.63
Toni opens her real estate office and hires Lynn as her temporary assistant. However, Lynn quits after Toni proves to be too demanding a taskmaster. Toni quickly finds a very efficient replacement, but she also leaves when Toni won't let her have everything her own way. With her grand opening just days away, Toni becomes desperate to find someone to help her out. Meanwhile, Joan fears dire consequences from her boss after a judge throws out an important motion for a seemingly insignificant reason.
41	19	"X Does Not Mark the Spot"	Sheldon Epps	Keith Josef Adkins	April 29, 2002	40338-040	4.21
Joan engages in surprisingly risky behavior after she begins dating a younger man, Chris. However, her friends urge her to re-consider the relationship after she inadvertently takes ecstasy at a night club. Meanwhile, Toni hires William as her attorney and tries to monopolize all of his time with trivial matters.
42	20	"My Mother, Myself"	Sheldon Epps	Mark Alton Brown & Dee LaDuke	May 6, 2002	40338-042	4.29
Maya is stunned to learn that her mother Jeanette is selling her house and moving away to San Bernardino with her boyfriend Earl (Harry Lennix). Toni's loudmouthed mother Veretta (Jenifer Lewis) surprises her by coming to town for Joan's Mother's Day brunch, much to Toni's chagrin. William eagerly anticipates a visit from his mother, who comes bearing a cake from his aunt's award-winning recipe.
43	21	"Just Dessert"	Sheldon Epps	Tim Edwards	May 13, 2002	40338-043	3.98
Lynn moves in with William, and soon suggests that they take their minds off their recent break-ups by becoming "sex buddies." Joan is adamantly opposed to this, and warns that it will soon blow up in their faces. Shelby recommends that Toni adopt a more "honest" hairstyle to try to improve her business. Maya has difficulty finding childcare for Jabari after her mother Jeanette moves away to San Bernardino with her boyfriend Earl.
44	22	"Into the Woods"	Sheldon Epps	Mara Brock Akil	May 20, 2002	40338-044	4.73
Joan decides to waive her "three-month" rule and sleep with Chris, but then receives a phone call from Sean. When she learns that Sean is back in town, she dumps Chris and expects to reunite with Sean. However, he stuns her by revealing that he is engaged. William expresses an interest in Lynn's co-worker, only to find that she is a lesbian with a crush on Lynn. Maya considers telling Darnell about her affair with Stan, but her friends talk her out of it. He soon discovers the truth in an unexpected way.

=== Season 3 (2002–03) ===
No. overall	No. in season	Title	Directed by	Written by	Original release date	Prod. code	U.S. viewers (millions)
45	1	"Coming to Terms"	Sheldon Epps	Mara Brock Akil	September 23, 2002	40338-047	4.73
Joan fears she has hit an all-time low after she holds a "Bring Your Ex" party, but doesn't get a single phone number. She eventually winds up swearing off men to train for a marathon. Maya still struggles to get Darnell to talk to her after a month apart. William threatens to throw Lynn out of his house unless she lands another job. Toni laments the lack of drama in her life.
46	2	"Getting Our Acts Together"	Sheldon Epps	Lamont Ferrell & Norman Vance Jr.	September 30, 2002	40338-045	4.59
Maya and Darnell seek marriage counseling from their minister. They find the counseling pointless, but engage in an afternoon tryst that has an overly enthusiastic Maya convinced that they are going to reunite soon. Lynn finds work as a bartender, despite the fact that she has no idea what she's doing. William tries to prove to Swedelson that he has the toughness required to be a partner in the firm.
47	3	"Secrets and Eyes"	Mary Lou Belli	Regina Y. Hicks	October 7, 2002	40338-048	4.88
Toni objects when Joan plans a birthday party for her. In the midst of their argument, Toni inadvertently reveals that she has been lying about her age for years. Joan and company tease Toni relentlessly about being older, and she grows insecure about her looks. After a disastrous Botox session, Toni seeks the advice of a plastic surgeon--whose only suggestion is therapy. Meanwhile, William winds up falling for a woman who was only supposed to be a one-night stand.
48	4	"Star Craving Mad"	Mary Lou Belli	Michael B. Kaplan	October 14, 2002	40338-051	5.24
Joan has several run-ins with an actor at the gym, but finds herself attracted to him. However, she re-considers her decision to date Ellis after discovering that he has lied to her. William's sister comes out to him, then asks him to become a sperm donor so that she and her partner can have a child.
49	5	"Don't Leave Me a Loan"	Mary Lou Belli	Tim Edwards	October 21, 2002	40338-050	4.62
After Lynn's unpaid loan has a negative effect on their credit, Lynn's parents pressure her to get a job and pay them back. Lynn's friends "help" her prepare for her interviews--by wrestling her to the ground and forcing her into a wardrobe change, as well as offering emotional support. Meanwhile, Maya hides the truth about her separation from Darnell from her mother.
50	6	"Invasion of the Gold Digger"	Mary Lou Belli	Keith Josef Adkins	October 28, 2002	40338-049	5.46
The girls instantly detest William's demanding girlfriend, Monica. Joan in particular is up in arms after Monica convinces William to renege on a promise to make her co-counsel for a big case because he would look better in the partners' eyes if he handled it himself. Joan seeks revenge on William, and the girls later confront Monica. Toni keeps running into plastic surgeon Dr. Todd Garrett. Although the two seem to have hit it off, Toni refuses to date him because of his lack of height.
51	7	"Blinded By the Lights"	Steve Zuckerman	Karin Gist	November 4, 2002	40338-053	4.83
Joan is excited when Ellis invites her to the premiere of his new movie, but he refuses to let her walk the red carpet with him (or sit with him at the film) because he wants to preserve his "bachelor" image. Ellis tries to make it up to her by doing a magazine interview with her. Meanwhile, Toni grows tired of client Laila Ali, who would rather hang out than do any house-hunting
52	8	"Handling Baggage"	Sheldon Epps	Lamont Ferrell & Norman Vance Jr.	November 11, 2002	40338-046	5.14
Maya's cousin Ronnie and his boyfriend, Peaches, tell Maya that they have spotted Darnell in a compromising position with a woman at the Red Lobster. It is the same woman that Joan once saw with Darnell years earlier. Maya confronts Cecily and learns that she is having an affair with Darnell. This leads the distraught Maya to declare that she and Darnell are now "even" and move back to the house, where she and Darnell make a decision about the future of their relationship. Meanwhile, William obsesses over the fate of a missing suitcase.
53	9	"The Mommy Returns"	Leonard R. Garner Jr.	Kevin Marburger & Michele Marburger	November 18, 2002	40338-052	4.75
Lynn meets her biological mother, Sandy, who suddenly appears at Joan's house. Although the two initially become friends, Lynn soon becomes embarrassed by some of Sandy's behavior. However, Lynn becomes intrigued by a documentary project about sexuality, and quits her job to help her work on it. Meanwhile, Joan and Maya drive each other crazy as Maya and Jabari stay with Joan while Maya looks for an affordable apartment.
54	10	"A Little Romance"	Leonard R. Garner Jr.	Gloria Ketterer	November 25, 2002	40338-054	4.37
Toni realizes she has fallen for Todd after he protects her during an altercation with a man on the street, but is still reluctant to date him because of his size. Joan is appalled when Ellis rates her only a 5.5 on looks on a scale of one to ten.
55	11	"Santa v. Monica"	Sheldon Epps	Michael B. Kaplan	December 16, 2002	40338-055	5.13
William agrees to dress as Santa Claus on Christmas Eve in the hopes of restoring Jabari's belief in Santa (something that seems to concern Joan just a little too much). However, Monica arranges for him to host the annual Christmas party for the senior partners and important clients on the same night, and pressures him to blow off Jabari and his friends. As they argue, Monica makes a startling revelation about the way he met. Meanwhile, Todd gives Toni a unique Christmas gift: a doll of herself, which has a bizarre effect on her.
56	12	"Take This Poem and Call Me in the Morning"	Katy Garretson	Lamont Ferrell & Norman Vance Jr.	January 6, 2003	40338-056	4.42
Lynn finds herself extremely attracted to a poet, and is stunned to learn that he has been celibate for five years. Ellis refuses to leave the house after fans on the Internet trash him and label him a sellout. William tries to win back the girls' trust following the Christmas Eve debacle.
57	13	"Howdy Partner"	Leslie Kolins Small	Tim Edwards	January 7, 2003	40338-057	2.14
Joan and William vie for a senior partner position, and are shocked when the firm instead brings in an outsider, Sharon Upton Farley (Anne-Marie Johnson). They plan to demonstrate their outrage by walking out, but only one of them follows through with it. Meanwhile, Lynn and Maya help Toni deal with her fears after Todd asks her to take an HIV test. This episode aired as a special Tuesday night showing in an attempt to boost ratings for the new sitcom Abby, which was making its premiere airing in on its regularly scheduled night.
58	14	"Single Mama Drama"	Sheldon Epps	Lamont Ferrell & Norman Vance Jr.	February 3, 2003	40338-062	3.69
Maya befriends a fellow single mother, a janitor at the law firm's building. They quickly make a connection, but Joan finds the woman's attitude irritating; and fears that her example could negatively impact Maya's relationship with Darnell. Meanwhile, William pretends to work at Lynn's office because he misses the camaraderie of a workplace; and Lynn tries to scam her co-workers out of money by pretending it's her birthday.
59	15	"Happy Valentine's Day...Baby?"	Ken Whittingham	Mara Brock Akil	February 10, 2003	40338-058	4.37
Ellis goes all out to give Joan a magical Valentine's Day, but the couple's future is put in jeopardy when he learns that his ex-girlfriend is about to have their child. Toni finds her Valentine's Day card from Todd offensive, and fears that he is only dating her because she is black. William cannot bring himself to tell Monica that he quit the law firm.
60	16	"Sex, Lies and Books"	Sheldon Epps	Regina Y. Hicks	February 17, 2003	40338-059	3.06
Maya becomes depressed and lonely after moving into a new apartment, despite the presence of a handsome and friendly neighbor. Toni and Todd take her on a double date with a friend of his, with disastrous results. William takes Monica on a romantic Italian vacation, where he plans to break the news that he has quit his job. Sharon invites Joan to her book club, then proceeds to humiliate her.
61	17	"A Stiff Good Man Is Easy to Find"	Sheldon Epps	Keith Josef Adkins	February 24, 2003	40338-060	3.86
Toni and Todd's relationship is thrown into flux after she inadvertently mentions marriage. When Toni goes into hiding, Todd seeks the assistance of her friends, who convince him that Toni loves him and help him confront his own feelings for her. Meanwhile, William finds himself extremely attracted to Sharon, leading to an odd face-off with Monica.
62	18	"Runaway Bridesmaid"	Sheldon Epps	Karin Gist	February 24, 2003	40338-061	3.56
Joan becomes jealous over Toni's engagement, and takes out all her frustration on Ellis, whom she begins blaming for all of her problems. She also resumes training for the Los Angeles Marathon just weeks before the event in an attempt to take her mind off Toni. Intimidated by Toni's expensive registry, William, Lynn and Maya pool their resources to come up with a wedding gift.
63	19	"The Pact"	Katy Garretson	Kevin Marburger & Michele Marburger	March 17, 2003	40338-063	4.07
Lynn and Maya confront Joan about her jealousy and overall bad attitude regarding Toni's wedding. Joan is upset when Toni announces that Reesie Jackson, her college roommate, is coming to town to be a bridesmaid. They get into a huge fight, and Reesie reveals that Brian, her husband and Joan's ex-boyfriend, gave her AIDS. Guest Star: Kimberly Elise as Reesie Jackson
64	20	"Where Everyone Knows My Name"	Sheldon Epps	Regina Y. Hicks	April 21, 2003	40338-064	4.11
Maya makes her friends feel guilty about leaving her alone as they spend time with their significant others. She convinces them to accompany her to a hangout in her old neighborhood, where she runs into Darnell. She is disturbed to learn that he has failed to tell her that he has gotten a small business loan to open a car repair business, and by the fact that he has a new girlfriend. Meanwhile, William plans to return to the law firm, but first tries to complete a list of things he wants to do before he dies--including becoming a Soul Train dancer.
65	21	"Too Much Sharin'"	Sheldon Epps	Michael B. Kaplan	April 28, 2003	40338-065	4.05
William and Sharon decide to continue their relationship, even after he re-joins the firm. Joan discovers that the two are together, and inadvertently blabs about it to Sharon in a moment of anger. Sharon breaks up with William, who shuts out Joan. Joan tries to rectify the situation, only to make things worse. Maya is desperate to find out what is going on when Joan fails to share the gossip with her. Meanwhile, Toni asks Lynn for tips for her wedding night.
66	22	"Blood Is Thicker Than Liquor"	Mary Lou Belli	Mark Alton Brown & Dee LaDuke	May 5, 2003	40338-068	3.88
Toni's family comes to town, and Toni worries that her mother will embarrass her in front of Todd's parents by voicing her objections to their Jewish background. Mrs. Childs becomes dejected about the bickering between Toni and her older sister, Sherri--whom Toni refuses to include in the bridal party--and falls off the wagon. Meanwhile, William worries that he will lose one of his few male friends when the man begins dating Maya.
67	23	"The Fast Track & the Furious"	Leonard R. Garner Jr.	Susan Watanabe	May 12, 2003	40338-069	4.26
Lynn persuades Toni to accompany her to Virginia, where she seeks Sandy's help before a presentation aimed at receiving a grant for her AIDS documentary. During the visit, Lynn meets her grandmother and learns a shocking secret about Sandy's health. After discovering how much money William is now earning, Maya tries to become his assistant in the hopes of improving her salary and returning to school. However, William will only sign off on the arrangement if Joan gives her approval. Guest Star: Kimberly Elise as Reesie Jackson
68	24	"The Wedding"	Salim Akil	Mara Brock Akil	May 19, 2003	40338-066	4.73
69	25	"The Wedding"	Salim Akil	Mara Brock Akil	May 19, 2003	40338-067	4.73
Joan promises to support Toni as the wedding approaches, but repeatedly neglects her in order to deal with her latest drama involving Ellis, who has failed to tell her that the mother of his child has been cast as his love interest in his movie. As a result, Toni tells Joan that she is not welcome at the wedding. Meanwhile, Sivad feels threatened by Lynn's past with William and orders her to move out of William's house; and Mrs. Childs fiercely tries to keep Maya away from Toni's med student brother, Antoine. Joan tries desperately to get Toni to forgive her and allow her to be a bridesmaid. However, it remains to be seen if there will even be a wedding, as Todd walks out on Toni because of her selfishness. Meanwhile, Lynn objects to Sivad's decision to write a poem for the wedding.

=== Season 4 (2003–04) ===
No. overall	No. in season	Title	Directed by	Written by	Original release date	Prod. code	U.S. viewers (millions)
70	1	"Some Enchanted Evening"	Leonard R. Garner Jr.	Mara Brock Akil	September 15, 2003	40338-070	4.16
Joan enjoys relative peace in her relationship with Ellis. However, she establishes a strong connection with a stranger whom she meets when they duck into the same doorway during a rainstorm. She is later surprised to find that the man is Ellis's agent, Brock. Brock meets with Joan outside a play when Ellis is called away to a meeting. They begin kissing, and end up back at Brock's place, where they declare their love for each other. Brock feels it is wrong to sleep together while she is still Ellis's girlfriend, so Joan promises to break things off. However, Ellis surprises her by finally telling her that he loves her. Sivad pressures Lynn to move out of William's house. He initially doesn't want to live with Lynn, but soon changes his mind. Toni grows annoyed with all of Todd's habits. After he reveals that he is deep in debt, she leaves him and shows up at Joan's house. William continually tries to get Maya to actually do her job, but she spends all of her time reading self-help books.
71	2	"If It's Broke, Fix It"	Leonard R. Garner Jr.	Mark Alton Brown & Dee LaDuke	September 22, 2003	40338-071	5.01
Toni refuses to speak to Todd because she is up in arms about his debt and feels betrayed by the fact that he failed to disclose this information sooner. While at the spa with Joan, Toni's ring is apparently repossessed by a woman on behalf of Harry Winston.
72	3	"Snoop, There It Is"	Sheldon Epps	Regina Y. Hicks	September 29, 2003	40338-073	4.36
After nine months of celibacy, Lynn becomes fed up and grows suspicious of Sivad. She contacts his ex-girlfriend in the hopes of gaining some insight into his behavior. Meanwhile, despite her debt, Toni is determined to acquire a $17,000 bag. Joan and William try in vain to convince her to moderate her behavior and live within a budget.
73	4	"You Ain't Gotta Go Home but...You Know the Rest"	Katy Garretson	Norman Vance Jr.	October 6, 2003	40338-074	4.32
Toni's twin brother Antoine comes to town for a weekend rendezvous with Maya, but soon spooks her by declaring his love and announcing that he will not return to Boston. When she rejects him, he locks himself in the bathroom and refuses to leave. Meanwhile, William orders Lynn to leave his house, but continually sabotages her efforts to find a roommate. Toni agrees to help Joan clean out her house, but insists that Joan's love life is what actually needs to be purged. Guest Star: Darius McCrary as Antoine
74	5	"Hopelessly Devoted to Two"	Sheldon Epps	Karin Gist	October 13, 2003	40338-072	4.39
Joan finds herself in a bind when she is forced to agree to a dinner with both Ellis and Brock. She does not know how to handle the situation, although she insists that she is going to stay with Ellis. Joan winds up sharing a passionate kiss with Brock. Ellis nearly catches them in the act, and her friends witness the whole scene from the laundry room. Joan finally confesses her actions on the night of the play to Ellis. He is initially furious, but later visits her and lets her off the hook. They admit that they cared about each other, but were never really in love. Joan dashes off to give Brock a call. Meanwhile, William tries to cut a deal with Maya to get her to actually do her job, but she continues to outwit him.
75	6	"Inherit the Lynn"	Katy Garretson	Kevin Marburger & Michele Marburger	October 20, 2003	40338-075	4.66
Maya learns that tuition has increased substantially, and she doesn't have enough money to cover it. William tries to give her the money by pretending she has received it from the firm's continuing education plan, but she turns him down. Lynn housesits for Joan so that her DSL can be installed while she is away with Brock.
76	7	"And Baby Makes Four"	Sheldon Epps	Michael B. Kaplan	November 3, 2003	40338-076	4.05
William convinces Joan to host a baby shower for his sister, Linda; and her partner, Kira. Kira's water breaks during the event. William wants to take her to the hospital, but they insist on having a midwife conduct a home delivery, which ends up taking place at Joan's house.
77	8	"Viva Las Vegas"	Sheldon Epps	Mara Brock Akil	November 10, 2003	40338-077	4.14
After Brock invites Joan to join her for a weekend in Las Vegas, she is convinced that he plans to pop the question. She brags about this constantly to her friends, but isn't so sure that she is really ready for marriage. She drives Brock crazy as she constantly makes him turn back to Los Angeles and then toward Vegas again, and even after he says that he is anxious to marry her, she continues to battle cold feet. Meanwhile, William carries around a baby doll to try to prove to his sister that he can handle the responsibilities of caring for a child.
78	9	"Between Brock and a Hard Place"	Sheldon Epps	Veronica Chambers	November 17, 2003	40338-078	4.76
Joan's enthusiasm about her new engagement is tempered when she learns that Brock doesn't want to have children, but she decides to relax and just focus on the immediate future. William, determined to beat Joan to the altar, proposes to Lynn. He promises to support her financially and let her live at his place. Meanwhile, Maya initially rejects a man because he is a security guard.
79	10	"Don't You Want Me Baby?"	Sheldon Epps	Tim Edwards	November 24, 2003	40338-079	4.63
Toni is furious to discover that Todd failed to deliver a message from a remorseful Greg before the wedding. Claiming that she needs closure but actually hoping to rub her happiness in Greg's face, she insists that she needs to meet with him. Todd fears that Toni still has feelings for Greg and threatens to leave her if she sees him. Toni declares that Todd needs to trust her; she ignores his ultimatum and meets with Greg anyway. Meanwhile, Joan is devastated when William's nephew/son cries every time she holds him, as she sees it a sign that she wouldn't be a good mother. After Jabari tells Maya and Lynn that his classmates think they are lesbians, Maya angers Lynn by saying that she wouldn't even be her type.
80	11	"Merry Ex-mas"	Mary Lou Belli	Keith Josef Adkins	December 15, 2003	40338-080	3.94
Maya invites Darnell's girlfriend, Lena, to her Christmas party in an effort to be civil. However, she grows jealous and gets Jalen to pose as her boyfriend. She is also furious when Lena gets Jabari a Game Cube (he wasn't supposed to get one because of his poor performance in school), and accuses the couple of not communicating with one another. Maya later catches Lena with a man at the bar, and winds up in the strange position of trying to help her with her relationship. Meanwhile, Joan gets really carried away while organizing a caroling outing for her friends.
81	12	"Prophet and Loss"	Sheldon Epps	Michael B. Kaplan	January 12, 2004	40338-082	3.84
A stranger stops Joan on the street and tells her, "You made the right decision." He claims to be a psychic, and manages to convince Joan that he is for real. She takes his words as a sign that she was right to break up with Brock. However, she soon re-considers after she runs into Brock on the street. She observes him playing with his young niece and concludes that she might be satisfied having children in her life without being a mother for a while. However, a visit to her gynecologist gives her pause when she is forced to face the fact that her child-bearing years are limited (because many older women face complications in their pregnancies). Meanwhile, a dream prompts William to confront Lynn about annulling their marriage. He accompanies the skeptical Maya when she tries to confront the psychic. After the man tells him that "she's right in front of you," he mistakenly believes that he is destined to be with Lynn. The psychic later directs him toward a woman waiting for a bus, who is not interested. However, William is more anxious than ever to get out of the marriage so that he can try to find the right woman.
82	13	"Comedy of Eros"	Mary Lou Belli	Tim Edwards	February 9, 2004	40338-081	3.82
Toni refuses to believe Joan's claims that she isn't upset about spending Valentine's Day alone, and insists on constantly trying to cheer her up. She follows Joan to the movies and annoys everyone by talking loudly and giving away plot points. A pro baseball star in Maya's class takes an interest in her, but she repeatedly shoots him down.
83	14	"Leggo My Ego"	Sheldon Epps	Regina Y. Hicks	February 16, 2004	40338-083	4.03
Joan's procrastination puts her job in jeopardy when she doesn't act quickly enough toward securing donations for a charity auction, which she has agreed to arrange for her boss. William seeks revenge after Lynn uses a photo of him in the shower (with an unflattering shower cap) to blackmail him into paying her alimony.
84	15	"Good Catch or Bad Hop?"	Sheldon Epps	Norman Vance Jr.	February 23, 2004	40338-084	3.42
Maya and her friends enjoy perks such as limo rides and entry to exclusive clubs, courtesy of her baseball player beau, Alex. She is reluctant to refer to him as her boyfriend, and bristles when he repeatedly makes up excuses to avoid spending time with her. She also objects when he surprises her with expensive new furniture. Alex convinces her to allow him to shower her with gifts, as he enjoys doing this and doesn't think of her as a groupie. However, when the girls show up at a party, Alex refuses to allow them to come inside. Toni forces Maya to face the fact that Alex only wants her as arm candy, to see when he sees fit while he continues to play the field. William continually bothers Alex for autographed memorabilia, while his friend Dan (who suddenly appears after learning that William knows a baseball star) can't seem to get the idea that Lynn isn't interested in him. Lynn, meanwhile, works on a documentary about single mothers. She pays them for their time by babysitting their kids.
85	16	"On the Couch"	Sheldon Epps	Mark Alton Brown & Dee LaDuke	March 1, 2004	40338-085	3.80
Toni continues to see her therapist, Dr. Miller. Rather than following the doctor's advice and writing a letter to her mother detailing her grievances against her, Toni instead brings her mother to her sessions. Veretta stays with Toni and Todd and monopolizes the house. Todd tries to tolerate her rude and thoughtless behavior, but insists that she stop smoking in the house. Veretta refuses, and says that she doesn't have to listen to Todd because her daughter paid for the house. They get into a heated confrontation, and wind up ordering Toni to choose between them. Meanwhile, William worries that the fact that he and Donna have such different backgrounds (she cleans bed pans for a living and insists on traveling by bus) will impede their chances of having a future together. He vows to try his best to keep the relationship going, because he considers Donna to be special. Joan obsesses over whether to resume sessions with her own therapist after Lynn and Maya make several derisive comments about her sanity.
86	17	"Love, Peace and Hair Grease"	Sheldon Epps	Karin Gist	March 29, 2004	40338-086	3.88
Joan grows increasingly bored with her job. William notes that she doesn't hold the passion for the law that is required to truly succeed in their profession. Maya receives a D+ for an essay about her personal experiences, but her work impresses the customers at Ronnie's salon.
87	18	"Wieners and Losers"	Sheldon Epps	Regina Y. Hicks	April 12, 2004	40338-087	2.87
The newly unemployed Joan cannot stand the idea of just sitting back and relaxing, and drives her friends crazy by constantly cooking and knitting for them. She goes to the mall, and winds up taking a job at Wienercycle. Her friends tell her that this is a very stupid idea and convince her to quit. She tries to do this, but is inspired by the teenage shift manager's take-charge attitude and decides to stay and help her. Joan tries to defend her bizarre actions as the result of her work ethic, but experiences a wake-up call when she learns that the manager isn't really as gung-ho about her job as she had appeared to be. Meanwhile, William annoys Toni, Lynn and Maya by flaunting his new $6000 pen. Toni gets revenge by swiping the pen, and the girls enjoy watching William behave like a madman as he tries to find it.
88	19	"He Loves Her, He Loves Me Not"	Sheldon Epps	Keith Josef Adkins	April 26, 2004	40338-088	2.91
Joan feels bad about the way the girls have treated William's past girlfriends and decides to go out of her way to make Donna feel welcome. She hosts a dinner to give them a chance to get to know her. Donna is unnerved by the closeness between Joan and William, particularly when they take it upon themselves to help her organize a Cinco de Mayo party for the convalescent home where she works and get really excited about it. Donna confronts William during the ride home and offers the opinion that he is in love with Joan. He insists that this is not true and tries to provide reassurance. He then angers Joan by backing out of plans to do a song and dance together at the Cinco de Mayo party. Donna observes William's reaction to Joan's ridiculous performance and again opines that he loves her. William tells her about the psychic, but Donna believes that her purpose might actually have been to force William to face his true feelings for Joan. Meanwhile, the girls are furious when they repeatedly lose their favorite lunch table to a group of Asian women with personalities similar to theirs.
89	20	"The Partnerless Partner"	Sheldon Epps	Michael B. Kaplan	May 3, 2004	40338-089	3.37
William is made a senior partner in the law firm. He is thrilled about this, as is Maya, who will now get a substantial raise. He brings a beautiful date to the party honoring his promotion. Joan comments that he now has everything he wants, but William still feels as though something is missing. He talks with Swedelson at a strip club. Swedelson says that William should not pursue a relationship with Joan and instead advises him to go after Sharon, who had earlier seemed to be sending William signals. However, William discovers that Sharon is involved with the building's security guard. He goes to Joan's house and tries to share his feelings with her, but backs down after she talks about thinking of him as her "big brother." Meanwhile, Toni, Maya and Lynn enjoy the benefits of an especially friendly masseuse.
90	21	"Just the Three of Us"	Sheldon Epps	Veronica Chambers	May 10, 2004	40338-090	3.65
Toni has an apparent breakthrough in therapy. When Dr. Miller asks with whom she would want to be stranded on a deserted island, she picks Joan and realizes from her explanation that it is because she loves her. Maya completes her manuscript and asks Lynn to read it and give feedback. Meanwhile, William continually frets over his hesitance to share his feelings with Joan
91	22	"Love Thy Neighbor"	Sheldon Epps	Kevin Marburger & Michele Marburger	May 17, 2004	40338-091	2.77
Maya's neighbor, Jalen, tells her that he would like to begin dating. She turns him down because she feels that she has too much going on in her life for a relationship. William writes to the child he sponsors, Pepito, about his dilemma involving Joan.
92	23	"New York Bound"	Salim Akil	Mara Brock Akil	May 24, 2004	40338-092	3.78
Maya self-publishes her book, Oh, Hell Yes, and sells it on the streets, where it is a tremendous success. Ronnie tells her that a major publisher wants to offer her a five-figure deal to release the book. Toni repeatedly tries to call Todd in New York, but he refuses to return her messages. She continues to act as though nothing is wrong in front of her friends, even when they express concern about her well-being. Lynn gets a new boyfriend, Lenny. Her friends note their physical resemblance and all the things they have in common (including allergies) and offer the opinion that they might be brother and sister. Lynn talks with Lenny's parents, who assure her that this is not the case. She breaks up with him because she is still freaked out at the idea that he could have been her brother, and decides to search for her birth father. William decides not to confess his feelings for Joan, and pursues an attractive woman he meets at the bar. However, he runs into Joan when she stops by the bar, and his date leaves for a moment to let them catch up. William winds up kissing Joan and telling her that he wants to be more than friends.
93	24	"New York Unbound"	Salim Akil	Mara Brock Akil	May 24, 2004	40338-093	3.78
Maya learns that the publisher wants to sanitize her book to make it more accessible to white readers. She convinces her editor to stand up for her vision and get the original version of the book released. She succeeds, and Maya receives $25,000. After William shows up at her house to confront her, Joan flees for New York with Toni. Toni sees Todd with his colleague, Natalie, and again assumes he is cheating on her. She makes a scene on the set as she begs him not to leave her. Joan is surprised to run into William, who has come to New York to give legal advice to Maya. Joan tries to tell William that she isn't interested in him romantically. He says that this is okay, and that things between them will soon return to normal. William runs into Monica, his evil, gold-digging ex-girlfriend. Lynn visits her birth mother, Sandy, for information on her biological father. She learns that Sandy wanted to marry Lynn's father, but Sandy's parents paid the man to go away. They claim it was because of Sandy's illness, but Sandy insists it was because the man is black. Lynn drops in on her girlfriends in New York, and later goes to see her father. She poses as a census taker and is prepared to leave when he denies having children outside his marriage, but stops when he admits to having a daughter. Todd tells Toni that their marriage is over because she doesn't trust him or care about him. She says this is not true. When he wonders why she is trying so hard to hold onto him, she reveals that she is pregnant. Joan realizes that she is in love with William and goes to his room to see him, unaware that he is with Monica again.

=== Season 5 (2004–05) ===
No. overall	No. in season	Title	Directed by	Written by	Original release date	Prod. code	U.S. viewers (millions)
94	1	"L.A. Bound"	Sheldon Epps	Mara Brock Akil	September 20, 2004	40338-095	3.75
Joan tries to confess her feelings for William, but knocks on the wrong door and winds up on the run from a crazed lesbian who thinks that Joan stole her girlfriend. Joan is repeatedly thwarted in her efforts to try to share her feelings with William, and gives up after he ignores her to have a tryst with Monica in the airplane's bathroom. Lynn returns to her birth father's house and admits that she is his daughter. Todd refuses to believe that Toni is pregnant unless she takes another test. She refuses, and orders him to be on the plane back to Los Angeles the next day. When he does not show up, she tries to hold up the plane to make everyone wait for him.
95	2	"The Rabbit Died"	Sheldon Epps	Mark Alton Brown & Dee LaDuke	September 27, 2004	40338-094	3.73
Toni's friends refuse to believe that she is pregnant, as they are certain it is all part of a ploy to win back Todd. Even after Toni shows them an ultrasound and experiences morning sickness, they still believe that she is lying and insist on tagging along to her doctor's appointment. After her pregnancy is confirmed, an apologetic Todd comes home to help care for her, but remains unsure about their relationship. Meanwhile, William grows fed up with Maya's poor performance at the office and places her on probation after her antics with client Rev. Al Sharpton (including giving him a copy of her book) prompt Sharpton to give William a lecture.
96	3	"A Mile in Her Loubous"	Sheldon Epps	Veronica Chambers	October 4, 2004	40338-096	3.91
Maya's cousin Ronnie is offended after she hires an agent. Upset that Maya refuses to acknowledge his role in her success, Ronnie demands ten percent of her $25,000 advance for writing the book. Joan has an awkward run-in with William and Monica at the cafe. She mistakenly believes that William is bringing Monica to Maya's birthday party, and tries to retaliate by bringing her own date, a boring shoe salesman. Meanwhile, Toni battles constant morning sickness.
97	4	"The J-Spot"	Sheldon Epps	Michael B. Kaplan	October 11, 2004	40338-097	4.04
Joan decides to open her own restaurant. William is offended when Joan fails to share the news with him, as he instead hears it from two junior partners at the firm. Joan responds by taking William to task for reuniting with Monica so soon after declaring his love for Joan. They get into a heated argument and decide to end their friendship. Joan finds the perfect space for her restaurant, but doesn't have the money to lease it immediately. Toni suggests that she get an investor, then tries to arrange a truce (for business purposes only) between Joan and the one person she knows who can supply enough capital for the restaurant: William. Meanwhile, Joan and Maya grow concerned by Lynn's behavior after she begins performing on the streets while painted up as a robot.
98	5	"Maybe Baby"	Sheldon Epps	Karin Gist	October 18, 2004	40338-098	4.19
Toni repeatedly tries to seduce Todd when he returns to L.A. for her three-month check-up. He instead tells her that he has consulted a lawyer and wants a divorce. Joan suggests that she re-consider her priorities and face the fact that she may be a single mother. Toni instead begins to question whether she wants to have the baby at all. Meanwhile, Joan learns that William is seeing more than one woman and does her best to try to sabotage the situation. William accuses her of jealousy.
99	6	"Too Big for Her Britches"	Sheldon Epps	Tim Edwards	October 25, 2004	40338-099	3.72
After learning that her agent has secured her a three-book deal, Maya becomes even more negligent in her duties as William's assistant. He finally ends up firing her. Maya then learns that her publishing company is being bought out and her deal is not going to happen. William refuses to re-hire her because he cannot bear to let go of her incredibly efficient replacement. Maya turns to Joan for help, but isn't too happy about becoming her assistant again. Meanwhile, Toni frets about her weight and her friends' seeming indifference to her concerns; and Lynn joins the ranks of the paparazzi.
100	7	"The Mother of All Episodes"	Sheldon Epps	Mara Brock Akil	November 8, 2004	40338-100	3.92
Joan's mother makes a surprise visit and constantly criticizes her, particularly about anything regarding her decision to open the restaurant. Joan grows fed up with her lack of support and tells her off, prompting Carol to leave. Joan also grows tired of fighting with William about the restaurant. She decides to buy him out to preserve their friendship, but he refuses to accept the check. They discuss his previous love confession, and William angers Joan by saying that he was "desperate." A ranting Joan winds up admitting that she tried to go to his New York hotel room to confess her feelings. They kiss and admit their love for each other, but Joan collapses when her mother emerges in a bathrobe. Meanwhile, Maya is concerned when she discovers that Jabari has been watching pay-per-view porn.
101	8	"When Hearts Attack"	Mary Lou Belli	Regina Y. Hicks	November 15, 2004	40338-101	3.94
Joan believes that she has had a heart attack, although the doctor insists that the episode was only an arrhythmia. Joan's mother explains that she did not sleep with William; she had gone to his house to talk, and was in a robe because she needed to shower before her flight. (William had called Joan, but Lynn erased the message because she was expecting a call about a kangaroo.) Although the misunderstanding is cleared up, Joan begins to have second thoughts about William...and then has second thoughts about her second thoughts. Meanwhile, Maya goes on Lynn's public access television show with the belief that she is going to promote her book, only to be ambushed.
102	9	"Who's Your Daddy?"	Mary Lou Belli	Tim Edwards	November 22, 2004	40338-102	3.76
Lynn is excited about a visit from her birth father, Ken, and his wife. Her adoptive father fears that he is losing his daughter and flies into town at the same time. Lynn grows frustrated because Ken doesn't spend any time with her, as his wife has planned the entire trip and is only interested in seeing celebrities. Meanwhile, Joan and William try to plan their first date, with limited success. Toni dodges Todd's divorce lawyer, who is trying to serve her with divorce papers.
103	10	"Porn to Write"	Leonard R. Garner Jr.	Mark Alton Brown & Dee LaDuke	November 29, 2004	40338-103	3.67
With her bills piling up, Maya is forced to consider a job writing for a porn publisher (which already employs Lynn). She turns down the position due to moral objections and resumes selling her book on the street. When she has little success--due in part to bootleg sales--Maya decides to give up on her dream and go back to working as a legal secretary. This does not work out, and she winds up accepting the job at the porn publisher. Fortunately, she is soon able to quit after her writing aspirations get a boost from a surprising source. Meanwhile, William and Joan quarrel after he goes home for Thanksgiving without her; and Toni vows to not talk too much about her pregnancy.
104	11	"All the Creatures Were Stirring"	Leonard R. Garner Jr.	Regina Y. Hicks	December 13, 2004	40338-104	3.62
William surprises Joan with a romantic Christmas getaway in Puerto Rico, but they wind up stuck at a seedy motel after a blizzard strands them in Cincinnati during a layover. Meanwhile, Lynn, Maya and Toni take advantage of Joan's absence to enjoy the holiday at her house without all of her strict Christmas rules and other demanding behavior.
105	12	"P.D.A.-D.O.A."	Sheldon Epps	Mark Alton Brown & Dee LaDuke	January 3, 2005	40338-105	3.74
Maya and Toni question William and Joan's relationship because of their refusal to show affection in front of others. The couple gives holding hands in public a try, but soon runs into Joan's ex Brock. William is perturbed when Joan fails to tell Brock that they are dating, and suspects that she still has feelings for him. Maya and Toni back up this theory, and Joan is forced to admit this is true. Joan later gets into an argument with Brock and reaffirms her relationship with William. Meanwhile, the mother of Lynn's ex-boyfriend Lenny goes all out to try to reunite him with Lynn.
106	13	"All in a Panic"	Katy Garretson	Karin Gist	February 7, 2005	40338-106	4.02
Toni reluctantly signs her divorce papers, and accepts a date from a persistent ex-flame after he kisses her. Maya, certain that Toni isn't over Todd, asks Todd to intervene in the hopes that they can give their marriage another try. Meanwhile, Joan hires a chef who turns out to be an ex-girlfriend of William's. Joan is upset until William tells her that the sex wasn't that good. William is forced to reveal that Lynn was the best sex he ever had--but Lynn doesn't feel the same.
107	14	"Great Sexpectations"	Roger Christiansen	Michael B. Kaplan	February 14, 2005	40338-107	3.57
As Valentine's Day arrives, William is very excited because he and Joan have been dating for three months and can now sleep together. Although William is anxious to get to it right away, Joan insists on planning a romantic evening so that she can finally have a good Valentine's Day. William agrees to go along with her wishes. However, their efforts to consummate their relationship prove so uncomfortable that they reluctantly come to the realization that they are better off as friends. Meanwhile, Toni, Maya and Lynn go out to dinner together for Valentine's Day and reveal their deepest, darkest secrets.
108	15	"The Way We Were"	Sheldon Epps	Kevin Marburger & Michele Marburger	February 21, 2005	40338-108	3.87
Maya has her first book signing, and her friends and family come to the store to offer their support. Joan, Lynn and Toni also read excerpts from Oh, Hell Yes. Maya is surprised and pleased when Darnell stops by to get a copy of the book signed. Although her friends believe she is overreacting, Maya insists that Darnell wants her back and determines that she must make a move on him. Meanwhile, Joan cannot handle being around William in the aftermath of their break-up.
109	16	"See J-Spot Run"	Sheldon Epps	Veronica Chambers	February 28, 2005	40338-109	3.96
Joan struggles to take care of last-minute details for the opening of her restaurant, including trying to secure a celebrity to make an appearance. Things grow more complicated after her publicist quits. Although she claims to be fine, Joan also grows upset over seeing William with another woman--especially when she discovers that their relationship is not what she believed it to be. She worries that she has lost William's friendship forever. Meanwhile, Maya, Toni and Lynn fear that they haven't been supportive of Joan. They go to great lengths to try to convince actress/comedienne Mo'Nique to attend the opening of J-Spot.
110	17	"Good News, Bad News"	Sheldon Epps	Shauna Robinson	March 28, 2005	40338-110	3.57
Following a fight with his father, Lynn's brother Matthew shows up and asks to stay with her while he pursues his music career. She tries to help him when he freezes during an audition, but winds up being offered the job as lead singer instead of him. Meanwhile, Toni is extremely reluctant to give up her massive closet to make room for the baby; and William is confused by a thank-you gift from Maya.
111	18	"Kids Say the Darndest Things"	Sheldon Epps	Prentice Penny	April 25, 2005	40338-111	3.57
Jabari becomes extremely sullen and disrespectful, and begins talking back to his parents. After he runs away from Joan's house while she is watching him, Maya and Darnell finally learn the source of Jabari's anger: he is upset over Darnell's engagement because he wants his parents to reunite. Maya and Darnell struggle over what to do about their son's despair. Meanwhile, Lynn and Toni refuse to believe that William's depression stems from his car's inability to pass a smog test. They insist that he is actually upset about the break-up with Joan, and pressure him to share his feelings.
112	19	"Finn-ished"	Sheldon Epps	Michael B. Kaplan	May 2, 2005	40338-113	3.41
After sleeping with bandmate Finn, Lynn believes that she can deal with an open relationship, but becomes extremely jealous whenever she sees him with other women. Meanwhile, Joan forces William to attend Toni's baby shower, although he believes such events should only be for women. He gives Toni an heirloom cradle that he expects to get back in the future for his own kids, only to learn that Toni has given it away to her cleaning lady (before firing her).
113	20	"The Bridges of Fresno County"	Sheldon Epps	Mark Alton Brown & Dee LaDuke	May 9, 2005	40338-112	3.75
Toni is surprisingly excited about a visit from her mother, as she hopes to be pampered before having her baby. However, she soon learns that her mother actually came to town because she recently received a letter from an "old friend"--and is considering having an affair with him. Meanwhile, William and Joan panic when J-Spot has trouble bringing in customers. They hope to correct this by giving the place an air of exclusivity.
114	21	"Wedding on the Rocks"	Sheldon Epps	Regina Y. Hicks	May 16, 2005	40338-114	4.42
After Darnell reveals that he has failed to get a band for his wedding (which is just two days away), Maya recommends that he hire Lynn's band. However, Lena is not impressed after hearing the group perform, and lashes out at Darnell. He turns around and blames Maya for the fight, accusing her of trying to sabotage the wedding. Darnell shows up at Maya's apartment drunk after the bachelor party and says that he loves her. Meanwhile, Lynn continues to battle her feelings of jealousy regarding Finn. William begins to complain about the restaurant, prompting Joan to suggest that he is actually dealing with issues about their break-up. After going into false labor, Toni vows to live life to its fullest in the short time left before she gives birth.
115	22	"...With a Twist"	Sheldon Epps	Mara Brock Akil	May 23, 2005	40338-115	4.36
Following Darnell's drunken love declaration, Maya enlists the help of Joan and William as she plans to break up his wedding. However, she soon has second thoughts. Joan tries to talk some sense into Darnell in the bathroom. Meanwhile, Toni gives birth to a baby girl before she is able to get in touch with Todd or the girls. Following the surprisingly easy delivery, Toni begins to wonder whether she really needs Todd in her life. Unable to hold back her feelings any longer, Lynn lashes out at Finn and quits the band.

=== Season 6 (2005–06) ===
No. overall	No. in season	Title	Directed by	Written by	Original release date	Prod. code	U.S. viewers (millions)
116	1	"Fits & Starts"	Gina Prince-Bythewood	Mara Brock Akil	September 19, 2005	40338-116	4.19
Following their reunion at his wedding, Maya and Darnell remarry in Las Vegas. However, they soon begin to bicker over their living arrangements. Todd refuses Toni's request for a divorce, insisting that they must stay together for Morgan. Lynn gets engaged to a lesbian after stopping her from committing suicide. William is very excited about Lynn being a lesbian, while Toni and Joan are not. Lynn soon discovers that her fiancée is extremely dysfunctional and demanding. Joan and William spend the night together, but discover that they are not physically compatible.
117	2	"Odds & Ends"	Gina Prince-Bythewood	Regina Y. Hicks	September 26, 2005	40338-117	3.73
Maya and Darnell continue to bicker. They ultimately decide to stay married, but date each other so that they can make a fresh start. Toni and Todd re-consider their divorce, but eventually realize that it is the best thing for all parties. Lynn tells Joan that she is not a lesbian; she only got engaged to Jennifer to stop her from killing herself. However, Lynn has a difficult time breaking off the relationship because of Jennifer's delicate mental state. Joan is angry with William for divulging details of their failed night together with Lynn. The two wind up commiserating about their romantic problems.
118	3	"And Nanny Makes Three"	Roger Christiansen	Kevin Marburger & Michele Marburger	October 3, 2005	40338-118	3.64
Toni wants to hire a nanny to help care for Morgan, but Todd convinces her that they should wait until after they have bonded with their daughter. Toni has great difficulty adjusting to motherhood, but pushes Todd away when he tries to help her. Todd grows very frustrated at Toni's irresponsible behavior, particularly when she accidentally locks Morgan in the apartment. After Toni fails to show for Morgan's first doctor's appointment (instead sending her with a nanny), Todd fears that she doesn't care for the child and decides to take action. Meanwhile, Joan becomes fed up with Maya and Lynn, who constantly eat at the badly struggling J-Spot without ever offering to pay for their meals.
119	4	"Latching On and Lashing Out"	Roger Christiansen	Kevin Marburger & Michele Marburger	October 10, 2005	40338-119	4.00
Darnell moves into the apartment directly across from Maya. They continue to deal with control issues, as Darnell objects when Maya implements a three-month "no sex" rule and tries to goad him into attending a party at Joan's restaurant. Jennifer comes to believe that Lynn is in love with Joan, as she avoids sex and constantly runs off to Joan's. Lynn tries to calm her by arranging for a commitment ceremony at the restaurant. Joan urges Toni to begin breast-feeding to help her cause in the custody battle. Toni eventually gets Morgan to relax and accept her, but Joan does not approve of her methods.
120	5	"Judging Edward"	Salim Akil	Vincent Brown	October 17, 2005	40338-120	4.24
When his mother undergoes an operation, William flies home to be by her side and must deal with his gruff and overbearing father, who refuses to offer his approval for anything William does. Meanwhile, Toni makes the girls feel guilty for failing to include her in their plans. They invite her to the movies, where she constantly complains about being cooped up with the baby and irritates other patrons with her loud talking.
121	6	"Everything Old is New Again"	Roger Christiansen	Tim Edwards	October 24, 2005	40338-121	3.40
Joan considers giving up on the restaurant and returning to law. She blows a chance at an interview, but attracts the attention of one of the partners at a law firm. He urges her to follow her dream and keep the restaurant open, and pursues her romantically. Joan is reluctant to date him because he is much older than she is, but he is persistent. Meanwhile, Maya has trouble coming up with a concept for her second book, leaving the publishers impatient.
122	7	"Trail and Errors"	Debbie Allen	Karin Gist	November 7, 2005	40338-122	4.17
William recommends that Toni work things out with Todd before the case goes to court, but they are unable to come to an agreement. Toni goes into the hearing to determine temporary custody with a completely incompetent lawyer and a mountain of evidence against her. Meanwhile, Joan refuses to believe that Kenneth is not taking Viagra, and winds up snooping in his medicine cabinet. Maya, Lynn and Toni tease William mercilessly after learning that he is seeing a much younger woman.
123	8	"Hot Girl on Girl Action"	Arlene Sanford	Michael B. Kaplan	November 14, 2005	40338-123	3.67
Jennifer refuses to put up with any more of Lynn's attempts to dodge sex. Lynn shocks her friends by announcing that she plans to go through with it. Meanwhile, the girls interfere with William's relationship with his new girlfriend, Jasmine, by pointing out his attempts to control her. William discovers this and rebuffs their advice, claiming that their bitterness over their own problems with men is actually behind their behavior.
124	9	"Sleeping Dogs"	Mary Lou Belli	Kenya Barris	November 21, 2005	40338-124	3.83
Maya convinces a reluctant Darnell to spend the evening with her friends. He ends up having a good time, as he and William square off against the girls in a "battle of the sexes." After Joan claims she would be willing to date a blue-collar guy, Maya and Darnell set her up with his friend Ricky. Ricky claims that Darnell slept with a stripper the night before reuniting with Maya, leading to friction between the couple. William gets very excited about the possibility of replacing Ricky as Darnell's friend.
125	10	"My Business, Not Your Business"	Eric Laneuville	Prentice Penny	November 28, 2005	40338-125	3.76
After intense discussion with her friends (including a generous offer of financial assistance from Maya and Lynn), Joan finally decides to shut down the J-Spot. However, William urges her to re-consider after he finds some success using the restaurant as a sports bar. Although the business is finally making some money, Joan is unhappy because it doesn't fit with her initial vision for the place.
126	11	"All God's Children"	Vito J. Giambalvo	Mark Alton Brown & Dee LaDuke	December 12, 2005	40338-127	3.82
Toni and Todd set aside their differences to celebrate Morgan's first Christmas and Hanukkah. Their mothers clash constantly, and soon begin pressuring Toni and Todd about the child's religious upbringing. After a talk with his mother, Todd tells Toni that he will drop the custody suit if she agrees to raise the child Jewish. Meanwhile, Maya is upset to learn that Darnell switched churches during their separation.
127	12	"The Music in Me"	Keith Truesdell	Vincent Brown	January 16, 2006	40338-126	3.11
Lynn's friends note that she and Jennifer have become increasingly dependent on each other, and warn her to correct this problem. Lynn becomes extremely depressed after a therapist convinces Jennifer to end the co-dependent relationship. The girls try to cheer her up and convince her to resume her pursuit of music. Meanwhile, William's assistant, Avery, turns to Maya for help--and later turns to desperate measures--when William severely overworks him.
128	13	"The It Girl"	Eric Laneuville	Mara Brock Akil	February 6, 2006	40338-129	3.92
Joan makes a connection with a writer who is researching the J-Spot as part of an article about the hottest night spots in Los Angeles. However, she fears that their personal relationship is responsible when she unexpectedly makes the cover of the magazine. She also meets a hot basketball star who seems interested in her. Meanwhile, William gives Lynn a guitar in the hopes of encouraging her music career. She proceeds to annoy everyone with her original compositions.
129	14	"Work in Progress"	Eric Laneuville	Prentice Penny	February 13, 2006	40338-128	3.40
Darnell feels emasculated after Maya must pay for a dinner out because his credit card was rejected. However, after a talk with the girls, he decides to take advantage of Maya's financial success by selling his share of the garage and pursuing his dream of working a NASCAR pit crew. Maya is less than thrilled by this news. Meanwhile, William, hurt that the girls turn to Darnell instead of him when they need something fixed, makes a mess of Joan's house as he tries to prove himself.
130	15	"Oh Hell Yes: The Seminar"	Eric Laneuville	Kevin Marburger & Michele Marburger	February 20, 2006	40338-130	3.54
Maya conducts a seminar in the hopes of increasing book sales.
131	16	"Game Over"	Mary Lou Belli	Tim Edwards	February 27, 2006	40338-131	3.74
Toni turns to Joan for support when the increasingly difficult custody battle strains her finances. However, Joan's improved social standing makes it impossible for Toni to rely on her. Joan accuses Toni of jealousy, and the two get into a bitter argument. Meanwhile, Darnell teaches William how to play video games, but soon grows very annoyed with his cockiness.
132	17	"I'll Be There for You... but Not Right Now"	Mary Lou Belli	Regina Hicks	March 27, 2006	40338-132	3.55
Maya and Darnell ask Toni to help them find a home, but she neglects them when dates with an old boyfriend add to her already hectic life. Meanwhile, Joan keeps canceling planned outings with William to attend celebrity-filled events.
133	18	"The Game"	Salim Akil	Mara Brock Akil	April 17, 2006	40338-133	3.54
Joan's cousin Melanie Barnett (Tia Mowry), an aspiring med student, wants to give up her future for a pro athlete. This episode served as the backdoor pilot episode for the Girlfriends spinoff, The Game.
134	19	"It's Raining Men"	Linda Mendoza	Karin Gist	April 24, 2006	40338-134	3.01
Joan dates three men all at once. William reunites with his old girlfriend Monica.
135	20	"I Don't Wanna Be a Player No More"	Linda Mendoza	Kenya Barris	May 1, 2006	40338-135	2.85
Joan finally decides to break it off with Derek and Curtis but she gets more than what she bargained for when she unexpectedly receives a breakup from the man she really wants to be with, Javon. Meanwhile, Toni gets thrown into jail after having a fight with Tammy, who allegedly set her up to get carjacked.
136	21	"Party Over Here"	Salim Akil	Mara Brock Akil	May 8, 2006	40338-136	3.47
137	22	"Ain't Nothing Over There"	Salim Akil	Michael B. Kaplan	May 8, 2006	40338-137	3.47
Maya moves into her new home, Toni and Todd try to come to a settlement, William pursues Monica, Joan attends an A-list party but makes a dramatic fool of herself, and Lynn writes a song revolving around the girls and how the four are drifting apart. Toni and Todd prepare for the custody battle, William runs into Monica and insist to rekindle their spark, Maya learns of Darnell's offer to Florida to join a pit crew, and Joan's night ends as bad as the next day begins. Note: This two-part episode marks the final appearance of Jill Marie Jones as Toni Childs.

=== Season 7 (2006–07) ===
No. overall	No. in season	Title	Directed by	Written by	Original release date	Prod. code	U.S. viewers (millions)
138	1	"After the Storm"	Salim Akil	Mara Brock Akil	October 1, 2006	40338-138	2.74
On Joan's last day in New Orleans volunteering helping the victims of Hurricane Katrina, she meets Aaron, a fellow volunteer who asks her out. When Joan arrives in L.A. she is determined to repair her relationship with Maya, Lynn, and most importantly Toni. Maya and Darnell return home from Florida where Darnell was working for NASCAR and find out that Lynn has moved in to their house. Meanwhile, William starts to regret his marriage proposal to Monica.
139	2	"In Too Deep"	Salim Akil	Regina Y. Hicks	October 8, 2006	40338-139	2.85
Joan returns to work at the J-Spot only to find that William has put Monica in charge of managing the bar to get her out of his hair. When Joan confronts William about Monica's new position, he reveals that he has made a mistake proposing to Monica but can't tell her. Meanwhile, Maya pressures Darnell to have another baby.
140	3	"Bad Blood"	Salim Akil	Mark Alton Brown & Dee LaDuke	October 16, 2006	40338-140	3.08
Joan starts to realize that Maya's house has become the hang-out spot and that she is no longer the center of the friendship. Later, Joan's doctor tells her that her cholesterol is too high, so she decides to have personal training sessions at her house and invites Maya and Lynn to join in. Maya gets upset and feels that Joan is trying to make her house the hang-out spot once again and Lynn gets caught in the middle.
141	4	"Hustle & Dough"	Mary Lou Belli	Vincent Brown	October 23, 2006	40338-141	2.81
In trying to seriously pursue her music career, Lynn informs the girls that she is performing at a local club during "open mic" night. While waiting at the club Lynn meets a record executive who offers to help her with her career, but she turns him down when she realizes he wants sex in return. While waiting for her chance to perform, Lynn falls asleep and misses her turn on stage. Lynn decides to take the executive up on his offer, but is embarrassed the next day when he ignores her. Meanwhile Joan and William discover a large amount of money is missing from the J-Spot.
142	5	"Everybody Hates Monica"	Arlene Sanford	Karin Gist	October 30, 2006	40338-143	3.13
Joan learns that Maya and Lynn did not tell her about a recent outing they had with Toni, who was in town for a brief visit. Joan explains to them that there is no need to keep things secret from her because she is over the whole Toni issue. Later, when Joan insists on bringing Monica into the circle of friends Maya and Lynn accuse her of using Monica as a substitute for Toni, Meanwhile, Maya asks for William's advice on phone sex after Darnell falls asleep during one of her monologues.
143	6	"If You Can't Stand the Heat, Get Out of the Boonies"	Mary Lou Belli	Prentice Penny	November 6, 2006	40338-142	2.92
Maya discovers Jabari has been skipping school and has plagiarized a major writing assignment. When Lynn suggests that Jabari may be "acting out" because of his new suburban environment, Maya disagrees and insists that she is giving him a better life. Later, Jabari gets arrested and Maya must get to the bottom of what is bothering him.
144	7	"Just Joan"	Salim Akil	Gregory Storm	November 13, 2006	40338-144	2.98
When Joan complains about the dating scene and her social life, Maya challenges her to empower herself, accept her singleness and go out to a trendy restaurant alone. Meanwhile, William must figure out how to keep Monica from learning he was once married to Lynn.
145	8	"Kareokee-Dokee"	Salim Akil	Kevin Marburger & Michele Marburger	November 20, 2006	40338-145	2.81
Joan and Maya discover that Lynn is singing for money on the street and at a Karaoke bar. They try to suggesting other ways to help launch her music career, but Lynn tells them to stop meddling. Later, Lynn receives several calls from Big Boi of Outkast who wants to work with her after listening to her demo, but Lynn assumes it is Maya and Joan playing a joke on her. Meanwhile, Monica becomes jealous of William and Joan's playful relationship.
146	9	"He Had a Dream"	Roger Christiansen	Mark Alton Brown & Dee LaDuke	November 27, 2006	40338-146	2.98
Maya begins to struggle with the responsibilities of homeownership and taking care of Jabari while Darnell is in Florida working for NASCAR. During a phone conversation, Maya and Darnell end up in a fight and Maya becomes hysterical when she can't reach him after a crash in his NASCAR pit. Meanwhile Lynn and guest star Big Boi clash while collaborating on their music, and William and Monica struggle to put together a seating chart for their wedding.
147	10	"I'll Have a Blue Line Christmas"	Debbie Allen	Regina Y. Hicks	December 11, 2006	40338-147	2.81
Aaron Waters, the man Joan flirted with in New Orleans, comes home to California and starts dating her, and Joan is so amazed at how well things are going that she anticipates something going wrong. Meanwhile, Maya and Darnell try to keep up with their neighbors and their holiday decorating.
148	11	"Wrong Side of the Tracks"	Mary Lou Belli	Vincent Brown	January 22, 2007	40338-150	2.25
Lynn is crushed when she receives a call from Big Boi saying that he is at a creative crossroads with the record company and he won't be able to use her music. Lynn is devastated by the news and begins to consider leaving Los Angeles, Meanwhile, after leaving NASCAR, Darnell must go back to work at the garage but is humiliated consistently by the new owner.
149	12	"I Want My Baby Back"	Debbie Allen	Kevin Marburger & Michele Marburger	January 29, 2007	40338-148	2.35
Maya fears that Jabari is growing up too fast after she and Darnell witness an interaction between him and a young girl. Meanwhile, Joan is uncomfortable using the bathroom at Aaron's house because she wants to maintain a sense of mystery in their new relationship, and Monica and William seek out advice from Lynn on how to spice up their sex life.
150	13	"Hot for Preacher"	Vito J. Giambalvo	Karin Gist	February 5, 2007	40338-149	2.71
When Lynn meets Eldon Parks, an attractive guy at a club where she is singing, but she becomes conflicted about dating him when she discovers he is a Baptist minister. Meanwhile, Joan tries to convince Maya to call a truce with Monica and be friends.
151	14	"Time To Man Up"	Eric Laneuville	Prentice Penny	February 12, 2007	40338-151	2.64
During an evening out, Maya and Darnell befriend Alicia and Ray, a new couple living in their neighborhood. When Maya witness an intense moment between the couple, she suspects that Ray is abusing Alicia. Darnell accuses Maya of being dramatic until he hears a fight coming from the couple's home. Meanwhile Joan is disappointed when she finds out her new boyfriend Aaron does not believe in celebrating Valentine's Day.
152	15	"Willie He Or Won't He Part III: This Time It's Personal"	Millicent Shelton	Michael B. Kaplan	February 19, 2007	40338-152	2.24
William and Monica's wedded bliss comes to a halt when William has too much to drink at their wedding reception and reveals that he had doubts about marrying her. Humiliated by William's comments, Monica wonders if she should end the marriage. Meanwhile, Maya is annoyed with Darnell when she discovers he knew about William's doubts and didn't share the information with her.
153	16	"What Had Happened Was..."	Mary Lou Belli	Karin Gist	February 26, 2007	40338-153	2.46
After Aaron and Joan experience an uncomfortable moment when they run into one of Aaron's ex-girlfriends, they decide to discuss their past relationships with one another to avoid future awkward moments. However, when Aaron introduces Joan to one of his good friends, Keith Atwood, Joan realizes they once had a brief affair, but she failed to share this with Aaron because Keith was married at the time. Meanwhile, Darnell helps William cope after losing Monica.
154	17	"Church Lady"	Keith Truesdell	Kevin Marburger & Michele Marburger	March 19, 2007	40338-154	2.15
Lynn continues to work at the church with Eldon and the children's choir, even though they have decided to end their short affair. Later, Joan and Maya get Lynn to admit she still has feelings for Eldon and is secretly hoping he will change his mind and give in to their physical attraction. But, Lynn is shocked when she learns Eldon has begun dating a member of the church who shares his beliefs in abstaining from pre-marital sex. Meanwhile, William decides to give the girls the silent treatment as punishment for interfering in his relationship with Monica, but is upset when they don't even notice he isn't speaking to them.
155	18	"Operation Does She Yield"	Vito Giambalvo	Michael B. Kaplan	March 26, 2007	40338-155	2.58
Worried about William's state after his breakup with Monica, Maya, Joan and Lynn go to Chicago to persuade Monica to get back together with William. When they arrive, they soon discover that Monica has been cut off from her family fortune, so Joan offers Monica a job at the J-Spot. Later, Williams is thrilled that Monica is back until she demands half of what he earned while they were together. Guest star: Jonelle Allen
156	19	"A Dingo Ate My Dream House"	Roger Christiansen	Lorin Wertheimer & Shawn Thomas	April 23, 2007	40338-156	2.34
Tired of all the inconveniences of living in the suburbs, Darnell suggests to Maya they should move back to the city, but Maya disagrees and does not want to give up her new home. When Joan and Lynn pressure Maya for the real reason she is opposed to moving, Maya reveals that she is pregnant. Meanwhile, Monica learns how to adjust to life without the help of her family's wealth.
157	20	"A House Divided"	Keith Truesdell	Mark Alton Brown & Dee LaDuke	April 30, 2007	40338-157	2.48
When Lynn's new boyfriend Eldon, finds himself at odds with the church members over his choice of having Lynn as a girlfriend, he is faced with a tough decision. Meanwhile, Joan pressures Aaron into buying a house, which leads to their first big fight. Later, Maya and Darnell resort to unconventional ways to sell their house.
158	21	"To Be Determined"	Salim Akil	Regina Y. Hicks	May 7, 2007	40338-158	2.89
159	22	"It's Been Determined"	Salim Akil	Mara Brock Akil	May 7, 2007	40338-159	2.89
Joan unexpectedly proposes to Aaron, but when he stumbles on his response, Joan decides the relationship is over and walks away. Meanwhile Maya and Darnell find their dream house, but when Darnell gets a chance to buy the garage, he must decide which purchase to make. Joan runs into her old boyfriend Brock, who tells her he made a mistake by letting her go and announces his intention to marry her now. Joan agrees to go away with Brock for a weekend in Catalina, but Maya and Lynn decide it's time to intervene. Aaron finally gives Joan the proposal of her dreams by inviting her close family and friends to the event.

=== Season 8 (2007–08) ===
No. overall	No. in season	Title	Directed by	Written by	Original release date	Prod. code	U.S. viewers (millions)
160	1	"Range of Emotions"	Debbie Allen	Mara Brock Akil	October 1, 2007	40338-160	2.57
Joan causes a dispute between herself and Aaron after purchasing an expensive kitchen range for their new house and not discussing it over with him. After they defuse their feud, Aaron receives unexpected news. Meanwhile, Lynn begins to flaunt her success with her progressing music career.
161	2	"Baghdad, My Bad"	Debbie Allen	Regina Y. Hicks	October 8, 2007	40338-161	2.53
Joan runs away to Mexico with Aaron in attempts to keep him from leaving to Iraq. While in Mexico, Aaron realizes that he cannot run from the war and the two of them decide that they should get married before he departs. Meanwhile, Maya automatically assumes that Jabari has been using marijuana when she finds it in her home. Also, Lynn reaches another milestone in her music career, but she doesn't feel comfortable celebrating because of Joan and Aaron's problem.
162	3	"Where Did Lynn-Digo?"	Debbie Allen	Kevin Marburger & Michele Marburger	October 15, 2007	40338-162	2.43
Lynn must decide whether to perform at a rally to raise awareness to save the environment; requested by a student she met at UCLA, named Xander or perform at the House of Blues, where her manager booked for her to perform. Meanwhile, After hearing Jabari use the "b" word, Maya gets upset with him and Joan enlists William assistance when she hears strange noises coming from her crawlspace.
163	4	"Losing It"	Millicent Shelton	Mark Alton Brown & Dee LaDuke	October 22, 2007	40338-163	2.21
While experiencing writer's block, Maya avoids her manager as her deadline approaches to complete her second book. Later, Maya learns that there may be some complications with her pregnancy and the doctor advises her to take it easy, but Maya doesn't comply. Meanwhile, Joan has a hard time getting Lynn to rent her apartment. Also, William and Monica realize differences in their relationship.
164	5	"Good Grief"	Millicent Shelton	Prentice Penny	October 29, 2007	40338-164	2.25
After having her miscarriage, Joan and Lynn worry that Maya is in denial and not dealing with her grief when Maya suspects Darnell of blaming her for it. Also, William and Monica prepare for their first dinner party. Meanwhile, Joan tries to persuade Lynn to finally open up a bank account.
165	6	"Spree To Be Free"	Millicent Shelton	Karin Gist	November 5, 2007	40338-165	1.99
After still being convinced that Maya is not dealing with her loss, Joan decides to take Maya on a shopping spree to help her recover but surprisingly, Joan realizes that she is the one who needs therapy because of Aaron departure to Iraq. Meanwhile, Monica tells William that she is pregnant but his reaction is unlike she expected.
166	7	"Snap Back"	Mary Lou Belli	Golden Brooks	November 12, 2007	40338-166	2.17
When Darnell confronts Maya about not dealing with her recent loss he learns shocking news that Maya has been taking pills to help her deal with it. Meanwhile, At an Erykah Badu concert with Joan, Lynn's manager informs her about a record label wanting to sign her. William also fears that his sex life will change after Monica has the baby after receiving information from Darnell about how a woman's body is after she gives birth.
167	8	"Save the Last Dance"	Mary Lou Belli	Vanessa Middleton	November 19, 2007	40338-167	1.80
Joan, William and Maya try to dispel Lynn's comment about them being old by going out to local clubs with her and trying to keep up with the younger crowd. Meanwhile, Lynn runs into Xander, who is still mad at her for canceling her performance at a rally raising awareness to save the environment.
168	9	"R.E.S.P.E.C.T. Find Out What it Means to William"	Mary Lou Belli	Michael B. Kaplan	November 26, 2007	40338-168	2.28
William considers leaving the law firm after feeling disrespected, causing Monica to worry that William won't be able to support their baby. Meanwhile, A neighbor enlists Maya to write a piece in the neighborhood newsletter. Elsewhere, Joan is offended by Lynn, who doesn't like her house warming gift.
169	10	"Deck the Halls with Bags and Folly"	Debbie Allen	Regina Y. Hicks	December 10, 2007	40338-169	2.07
Joan plans a Christmas party at her old law firm in efforts to help raise money for the support group she has recently enrolled in for the families of those in Iraq, Meanwhile, William tries to get Monica in the holiday spirit and Maya and Darnell try to keep up with Lynn's costly holiday gifts.
170	11	"Adapt to Adopt"	Debbie Allen	Mark Alton Brown & Dee LaDuke	February 4, 2008	40338-170	1.96
Maya and Darnell romanticize the idea of adopting a child after attending a group for adoptive parents.
171	12	"What's Black-A-Lackin'?"	Tracee Ellis Ross	Kevin Marburger & Michele Marburger	February 11, 2008	40338-172	1.69
Lynn gets upset when she learns that the reason her record label is pushing back the release of her album is to promote another upcoming artist, Chrisette Michele and decides to confront her label only to learn that the reason they are pushing her back is because they feel that she's not black enough. Meanwhile, When William accidentally reveals the sex of the baby to Monica via text message, he enlists Joan to help him retrieve the phone before Monica sees it against her wishes.
172	13	"Stand and Deliver"	Debbie Allen	Prentice Penny	February 11, 2008	40338-171	1.93
In the series finale, Maya tries to help Joan with her streets smart when students at Aaron's old school give Joan a hard time while trying to read a letter he's sent to his former students, Meanwhile, Lynn turns in sub-par songs in attempt to get out of her record deal. Also, William tries to teach Jabari how to drive.
