= Wilton Historic District =

Historic district in California, United States

- U.S. National Register of Historic Places
- U.S. Historic district
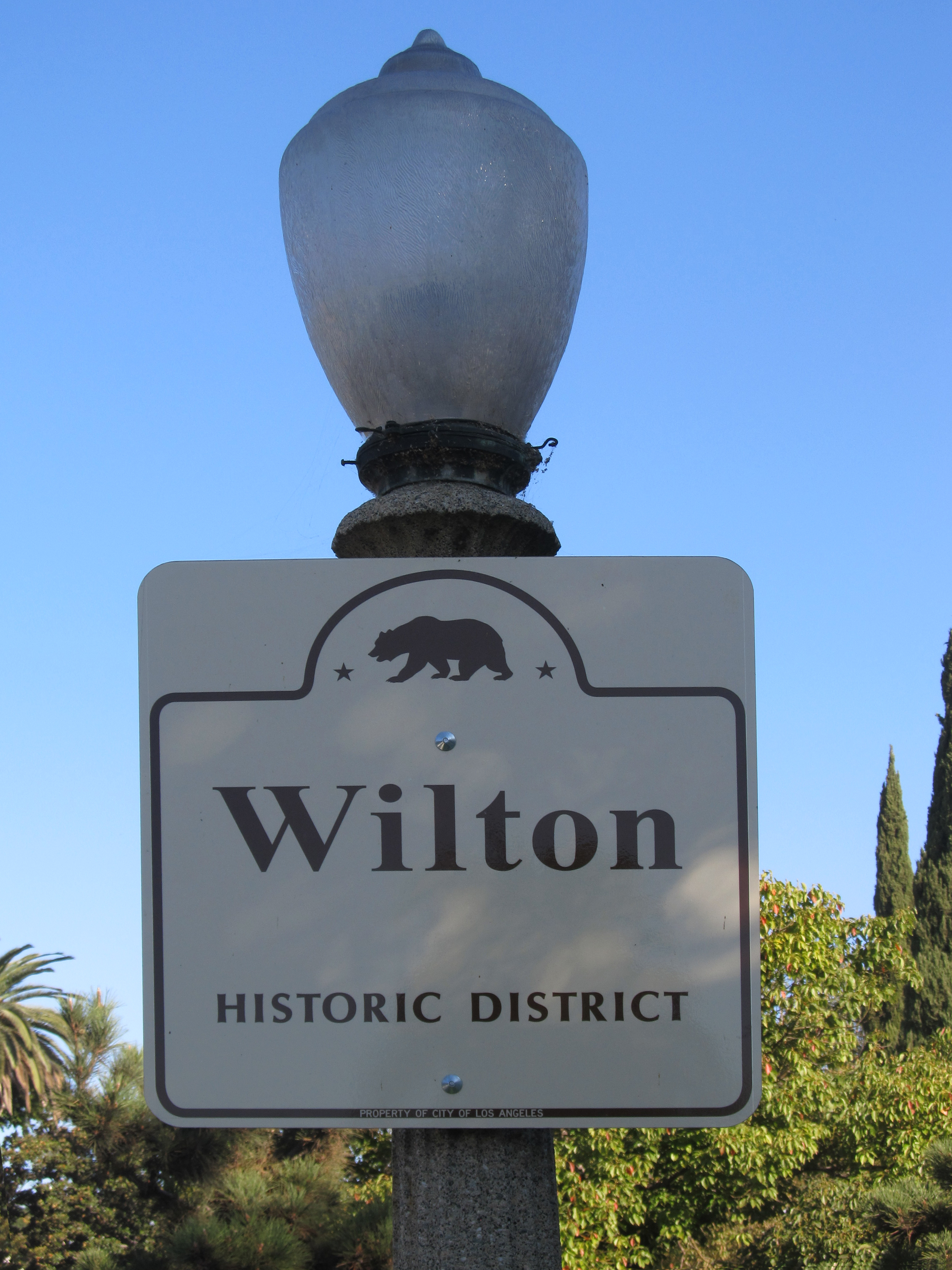
- Wilton Historic District signage located on South Wilton Place

- Location within Los Angeles
- Location: Los Angeles, California
- Coordinates: 34°4′16″N 118°18′47″W
- Built: 1904
- Architectural style: Colonial Revival, Bungalow/Craftsman
- NRHP reference No.: 79000490
- Added to NRHP: July 24, 1979

The Wilton Historic District is a historic district of single family residences in Los Angeles, California from the early 20th century.

== Geography ==
The neighborhood is bounded by Ridgewood Place and South Wilton Drive on the west, South Wilton Place on the east, First Street on the north and Third Street on the south. The district includes the 100 and 200 blocks of S. Wilton Place and the 100 blocks of S. Wilton Drive and Ridgewood Place.

The Wilton Historic District contains 63 single family residences dating from 1907 to 1925. Two additional houses were built in the mid-1930s.

== History ==
The neighborhood was planned as an upper-middle-class, single-family residential area when Western Avenue was the city's western border. The 65 houses along Wilton Place and Wilton Drive include examples of Classical Revival, Colonial Revival and Craftsman architecture.

In 1972, the city announced plans to widen and straighten Wilton Place to improve the flow of traffic. Residents objected and asked the state to designate the area as historic. In 1979, the Wilton Historic District became the third area in the city to be placed on the National Register of Historic Places.

== Historic-cultural monuments ==
- 103 S. Wilton Drive is Los Angeles Historic-Cultural Monument #650.
- 132 S. Wilton Place is Los Angeles Historic-Cultural Monument #649.
- 212 S. Wilton Place is Los Angeles Historic-Cultural Monument #925.
- 215 S. Wilton Place is Los Angeles Historic-Cultural Monument #568.
- 220 S. Wilton Place is Los Angeles Historic-Cultural Monument #1005
- 245 S. Wilton Place is Los Angeles Historic-Cultural Monument #1032

== Media ==
On the television show Girlfriends, Joan lived in a home in the Wilton Historic District.

== Notable residents ==
- Lewis Stone, actor

== See also ==
- List of Registered Historic Places in Los Angeles
