= Girlfriends (American TV series) =

American sitcom television series (2000–2008)

- Genre: Sitcom; Comedy drama
- Created by: Mara Brock Akil
- Starring: Tracee Ellis Ross; Golden Brooks; Persia White; Jill Marie Jones; Reggie Hayes; Khalil Kain; Keesha Sharp
- Music by: Camara Kambon; Kurt Farquhar
- Opening theme: "Girlfriends" performed by Angie Stone
- Ending theme: "Girlfriends" (instrumental)
- Country of origin: United States
- Original language: English
- No. of seasons: 8
- No. of episodes: 172 (list of episodes)

Production
- Executive producers: Kelsey Grammer; Mara Brock Akil; Regina Y. Hicks
- Producers: Kevin Marburger; Mary Fukuto-Salzman; Michele Marburger
- Camera setup: Multi-camera
- Running time: 22 minutes
- Production companies: Paramount Network Television; CBS Paramount Network Television; Grammnet Productions; Happy Camper Productions

Original release
- Network: UPN
- Release: September 11, 2000 – May 8, 2006
- Network: The CW
- Release: October 1, 2006 – February 11, 2008

Related
- Moesha; The Game

Girlfriends is an American sitcom television series created by Mara Brock Akil that premiered on UPN on September 11, 2000, where it aired for its first six seasons until May 8, 2006. On October 1, 2006, it moved to The CW, a new network formed by the merger of UPN and The WB, where it aired for two more seasons before being cancelled on February 11, 2008.

== Episodes ==
Season	Episodes	Originally released			Rank	Average viewership (in millions)
Season	Episodes	First released	Last released	Network	Rank	Average viewership (in millions)
1	22	September 11, 2000	May 14, 2001	UPN	No. 136	3.2
2	22	September 10, 2001	May 20, 2002	UPN	No. 129	4.2
3	25	September 23, 2002	May 19, 2003	UPN	No. 133	4.1
4	24	September 15, 2003	May 24, 2004	UPN	No. 128	3.6
5	22	September 20, 2004	May 23, 2005	UPN	No. 130	3.61
6	22	September 19, 2005	May 8, 2006	UPN	No. 135	3.4
7	22	October 1, 2006	May 7, 2007	The CW	No. 138	2.5
8	13	October 1, 2007	February 11, 2008	The CW	No. 150	2.1

=== Broadcast history ===
The series debuted on UPN on Monday September 11, 2000. After airing for several years on the network at 9:00/8:00c on Mondays, The CW moved Girlfriends to Sundays at 8:00/7:00c. After this, the ratings plummeted. On October 9, 2006, Girlfriends, along with The CW's other black-aimed programs, moved back to Mondays. At this point, Girlfriends returned to its original time slot.

Due to the 2007–08 Writers Guild of America strike, the last episodes produced aired on February 11, 2008. The CW had announced plans to move the series to Sunday nights. However, it was later announced on February 13, 2008, that the series was cancelled after eight seasons and a proper series finale would not be produced. A representative from The CW stated that the network was going to cancel the series due to low ratings and that it would have been too expensive to re-enter production.

A retrospective episode was in development to conclude the series, but was later scrapped. The CW had offered the actors only half of their usual episodic salary to take part, and the actors collectively turned the offer down.

== Characters ==
=== Main ===
- Joan Carol Clayton, Esq: (Tracee Ellis Ross) is considered the unofficial "den mother" of the group, as she frequently looks out for her friends, even at the expense of dealing with her own problems, which are plentiful throughout the series. Originally from Fresno, Joan owns a home in the Wilton Historic District. Joan met Toni when they were children and then met Lynn in college, and Maya is her assistant at the law firm. She has always had relationship issues and gave up her law career to pursue her dreams. She and Toni clash several times throughout the series, resulting to the end of their 23-year-old friendship. Major incidents involved Joan inadvertently revealing Toni's cheating to Greg, and Joan's jealousy of Toni's marriage to Todd, but their friendship officially ends by the end of Season 6 when Joan fails to appear for Toni's custody hearing. For much of Season 7, Joan mourned the loss of her friendship with Toni, eventually opting to resent and belittle her in front of the group. At the end of Season 7, she became engaged to Aaron Waters, whom she met while rehabilitating homes in New Orleans damaged by Hurricane Katrina; she moved into his home in West Adams while Aaron was deployed to Iraq and rented her house to Lynn.
- Maya Denise Wilkes (née Wood): (Golden Brooks) is a former assistant to Joan and a housewife/author. Maya grew up in Compton and is married to her high school sweetheart, Darnell. They have one child, Jabari. Maya is the youngest and sassiest of the group, and is often at odds with Toni over her ego-driven lifestyle. She is a devoted wife and mother, and is frequently depicted with stronger religious and moral convictions. Maya is the most "working-class" member of the group, especially in earlier seasons. In the first few seasons Maya was more obviously "from the hood", with the associated stereotyped speech and mannerisms. However, as she becomes more successful in her career and interacts more extensively with the legal and publishing industries, she exhibits fewer stereotypes; while still obviously from a different social background as the rest of the group, she is no longer as caricatured. In the early seasons, Maya's marriage to Darnell imploded after she had an emotional affair with an acquaintance. Later, after she launches a career as a self-help author, they reunite. In Season 8, the couple endured a miscarriage and later explored the possibility of adopting a baby girl. Over the course of the series, Maya lived in South Central, Leimert Park, and finally bought her dream house with Darnell in Lancaster. At the end of Season 7, Maya and Darnell sell their home in Lancaster and move to West Adams.
- Lynn Ann Searcy: (Persia White) was Joan and Toni's mixed-race roommate at UCLA and lived with Joan for eight years until the series begins. Lynn holds five post-graduate degrees. Born in Virginia to a black father and a bipolar white mother from a wealthy family, Lynn was adopted by a white family in Seattle (her father affectionately calls her "Noodle" due to hair texture). She did not embrace her black heritage until college. When Joan decides it is time for Lynn to move out of her home, Lynn reluctantly becomes more independent by taking on several, mostly menial jobs. She previously lived with Toni, William, Maya, and Sivad (temporarily); and shared a garage with then-boyfriend Vosco before moving into her own apartment (after becoming a property manager at the complex where Maya lived). She produces a documentary on the HIV/AIDS pandemic, focusing on African-American women. While Lynn is depicted as the most sexually adventurous one of the group (with frequent mentions of one-night stands, group sex, sex toys, and her infamous "Lynn Spin"), she also dates frequently. She is most attracted to artistic and spiritual men, and over the course of the series has relationships with a Jamaican immigrant, a poet, a pastor, and a musician named Finn (the recording artist Tricky). She was also briefly married to William. Her romantic involvement with Lenny (who was so similar to Lynn that the others labeled him as her "brother") was the catalyst for her to search for her biological father. After dating Finn, she discovers that music is her passion, and starts a band called Indigo Skye. Lynn is often considered the bohemian of the group, with her carefree nature and down-to-earth personality, and is a vegan. By Season 8, she had signed with "Dirty Girl" Records.
- Antoinette "Toni" Marie Childs-Garrett: (Jill Marie Jones, Seasons 1–6) has been Joan's friend since they were eight years old, they attended elementary, high school, and college together. Toni grew up poor on a farm with an alcoholic mother in Fresno, and has a twin brother, Antoine Childs whom Maya Wilkes had a brief fling with. Toni is considered the shallow and popular one of the girlfriends and is the self-proclaimed "cute one" of the group. During the first season, Toni and Maya don't get along (she considered Maya to be a lower-class intruder), but ultimately embraced her friendship. Toni is a real-estate agent who eventually opens her own brokerage. She rekindles her romance with Greg Sparks (the "love of her life"), but he dumps her when he learns she cheated on him with Dr. Clay Spencer. Toni unexpectedly finds love with Todd Garrett, a white, Jewish plastic surgeon, whom she marries after a short courtship. After a rocky year-long marriage, the two separate after Todd moves to New York. Toni and Todd have a birth child named Morgan. They fight over custody, but at the end of the 6th season work out their issues. Joan misses the custody hearing leading to the fight that ultimately ends Toni and Joan's friendship. Toni moves to New York City so Morgan can be closer to Todd, but has maintained her friendships with Maya and Lynn. Toni's condo was located in Larchmont Hancock Park, specifically the historic 450 El Royale building.
- William Jerome Dent, Esq: (Reggie Hayes) is the girls' closest male friend. He is senior partner at Goldberg, Swedelson, McDonald and Lee. Hailing from Kansas City he is portrayed as somewhat of a "mama's boy", but possesses self-confidence and a dry sense of humor. (One episode focused on his distant and complicated relationship with his father, who is a perfectionist.) After being left at the wedding altar by the woman he loved and police officer, Yvonne Blackwell, he reluctantly continues dating, including Donna, Kara, senior partner Sharon Upton Farley (played by Anne-Marie Johnson), and the at-times vicious Monica Charles Brooks (whom he ultimately marries). Fearing that Joan would beat him to the altar, he eloped with Lynn on a whim; though he quickly realized that he wanted to find true love and they ultimately divorce. He later realizes that Joan is the right woman for him, but after three months of courting, the two end their relationship. He became a sperm donor for his sister Linda and her same-sex partner, and regards the baby as his "nephew-son." He is also co-owner of the J-Spot restaurant with Joan. In later seasons, William forges a tight bond with Darnell, Maya's husband. During Season 7, he was working on his marriage with Monica. According to William's mother, his middle name is spelled with two "R"s, and a silent "W". Beginning in season 2, William owns a home in the Valley.
- Darnell Leroy Wilkes: (Flex Alexander Season 1, and then Khalil Kain, Seasons 6–8, main; 2–5, recurring) is Maya's husband. He and Maya married at a young age and had their son, Jabari. Darnell was an airport baggage handler, before becoming a mechanic at a local car repair shop. For a while, he was a NASCAR pit crew mechanic. After Maya's affair with Stan Wright when the two split. In earlier seasons, he felt threatened by Maya's friendship with Joan, Toni and Lynn; though he ultimately put his issues aside and became friends with them. After the divorce, he dated a woman named Lena (Chenoa Maxwell) whom Maya disliked because she still had feelings for Darnell. At Lena and Darnell's wedding Maya professed her love for Darnell. The two reconcile and begin living together again in Season 6. In the end of Season 7, Darnell accepts an offer to buy back his garage and get Maya and Jabari a new house in Los Angeles. After suffering a miscarriage, the couple considers adopting a baby girl.
- Monica Charles Brooks-Dent: (Keesha Sharp, Seasons 7–8, main; 3–6, recurring) is William's wife. All four of the girlfriends (especially Lynn and Toni) hated her (Joan comes to see her vulnerable side and becomes her friend, and Toni moves to New York City at the end of the sixth season). In the seventh season, the girls slowly and later fully accept Monica as their friend as Monica does the same. Although engaged to William, the two date twice before; they meet at a bar the first time. Since the last time William proposes to her in Monaco, he has occasionally had doubts about ever doing so. Eventually William and Monica marry, but on their wedding day he has too much to drink and confesses that he has had and still has doubts about marrying her. Monica leaves William in Season 7, but returns shortly after the girlfriends go to Chicago to persuade her to get back together with William. On their visit, the girls discover that Monica, due to her father's dementia and her mother's power of attorney, has been cut off from her family fortune, so Joan offers Monica a job at the J-Spot. William is thrilled about Monica's return until she demands half of what he earned while they were married. They manage to slowly rebuild their relationship but constantly clash at the J-Spot. In the Season 7 finale, Monica and William get back together. By Season 8, Monica was pregnant and is seen spending more time with the other three girlfriends, particularly Joan.

=== Recurring ===
- Jabari Darnell Wilkes: (Seasons 1–6 played by: Tanner Scott Richards, Season 7–8 played by: Kendré Berry) is Maya and Darnell's son. He was born when Maya was 16 years old. He was depicted to be a sweet, innocent child but once he entered his teenage years he seemed to be a little more dimwitted and rebellious.
- Jeanette Wood: (played by Charmin Lee) is Maya's no-nonsense mother who won't hesitate to put a switch to her adult daughter. She babysat Jabari while he was younger, and also rented out her garage for Lynn and her then-boyfriend Vosco to live in after Joan kicked her out of her house. She initially took an instant dislike to Joan's "sadiddy" behavior towards Maya's style (also labeling Joan as "classist" and "egregious" as Maya does), but eventually grew to accept her. She and Maya also clash when she decides to sell her house to move to San Bernardino with her boyfriend Earl (Harry Lennix), whom Maya doesn't like. Jeanette was seen throughout Seasons 1–7.
- Veretta Childs: (played by Jenifer Lewis) is Toni's loud and outspoken mother from Fresno whose high-spirited behavior and garish outfits often embarrass Toni. She suffered from alcoholism during Toni's formative years, which put a strain on their relationship. Veretta eventually sobered up. However, she briefly relapsed during Toni and Todd's engagement party - this was partially due to her guilt over her daughters Toni and Sherri not getting along. While she and Toni often clash, she supports her daughter. Veretta appears throughout Seasons 2-6.
- Ronnie: (played by Lamont Johnson) is Maya's cousin and hair stylist. In the series he helped sell her semi-biographical book. He owns two beauty salons called Situations and Situations Deux. He is last seen at the ending of season 7 as Aaron proposed to Joan.
- Peaches: (played by Shawn Harrison) Ronnie's boyfriend who is a hairstylist at Situations and had a short stint as Joan's assistant and temporary confidante after Maya goes to work as William's secretary after William becomes Senior Partner. Peaches is last seen at the ending of season 7 as Aaron proposes to Joan. Peaches also made a cameo in a second-season episode of Eve.
- Sherri Childs: (played by Yvette Nicole Brown) Toni's oldest sister whom she does not get along with due to Toni leaving the family due to their mother's alcoholism to go to school. They reconcile their relationship in the episode where Toni marries Todd. She, alongside Lynn, Maya and Melanie (Toni's other sister) were a part of her ceremony as her bridesmaids. She appears in two episodes in season 3.
- Davis Hamilton: (played by Randy J. Goodwin) owner and operator of the girls' favorite restaurant/hangout spot, 847 (Season 1). He and Joan flirted with one another, and almost went away for a romantic weekend while both were involved with other people. However, during Season 4, in the aftermath of Joan's breakup with Brock, she runs into Davis at a movie theater. She learns that Davis had lost the restaurant and also ended his relationship with his fiancée. They talk about how they missed the opportunity to start a relationship, and ultimately decide to just remain friends.
- Charles Swedelson: (played by Phil Reeves) the managing partner at Goldberg, Swedelson, McDonald and Lee who is also Joan's and William's supervisor. Though highly professional, he is known to have a roving eye for the ladies, and tends to use "hip-hop" and "urban" euphemisms towards Joan and William to appear more laid back and sociable. Mr. Swedelson was seen throughout the entire series run.
- Yvonne Blackwell (pronounced Yuh Von): (played by Cee Cee Michaela) William's girlfriend, later fiancée in the first two seasons. Yvonne originally was a crazy police officer that William met online and went on a date in the Season 1 episode, "Hip-Ocracy" but Yvonne and William start dating midway through the first season and later get engaged at the beginning of Season 2. Yvonne quits the police force after her life was put on the line and after William issued her an ultimatum. During Season 2, Yvonne and William have some issues in their relationship mainly because William bought a house unbeknownst to Yvonne. Later in the episode, "Willie or Won't He II: The Last Chapter?", Yvonne and William marry but she leaves William at the altar after confessing the many problems happening in their relationship.
- Dr. Todd Garrett: (played by Jason Pace, seasons 3–6) A Jewish Beverly Hills Doctor that Toni later marries. He first appeared in the Season 3 episode "Secrets and Eyes"

==== Guest appearances ====
- Adrian Lester; Ellis Carter (9 episodes)
- Aldis Hodge; Matthew Miles (2 episodes) & Derwin Davis (1 episode)
- Angie Stone; Darla Mason (1 episode)
- Anne-Marie Johnson; Sharon Upton Farley (7 episodes)
- Bebe Moore Campbell; Herself (1 episode)
- Bernard Parks; Himself (1 episode)
- Bernie Casey; Edward Dent (1 episode)
- Bern Nadette Stanis; Herself (1 episode)
- Beverly Johnson; Herself (1 episode)
- Big Boi; Himself (3 episodes)
- CCH Pounder; Dr. Myers (1 episode)
- Cee Cee Michaela Harshaw; Yvonne Blackwell (14 episodes)
- Car'ynn Sims; Chevonne Brown (1 episode)
- Chante Moore; Herself (1 episode)
- Charnele Brown; Beverly (1 episode)
- Christina Vidal; Samantha Stephens (2 episodes)
- Chrisette Michele; Herself (1 episode)
- Christopher Darden; Himself (1 episode)
- Chuma Hunter-Gault; Greg Sparks (11 episodes)
- Cindy Williams; Lisa (2 episodes)
- Common; Omar (1 episode)
- Coby Bell; Jason Pitts (1 episode)
- Danny Bonaduce; Himself (1 episode)
- Darius McCrary; Antoine Childs (1 episode)
- David Groh; Michael Goldberg (2 episodes)
- David Ramsey; Randall Potter (1 episodes)
- Dawn Wells; Herself (1 episode)
- Dawnn Lewis; Linda Dent (2 episodes)
- Demond Wilson; Kenneth Miles (4 episodes)
- Dondre T. Whitfield; Sean Ellis (11 episodes)
- Donnie McClurkin; Himself (1 episode)
- Don Franklin; Stan (5 episodes)
- Doug Spearman; Man (1 episode)
- Drew Sidora; Sage (1 episode)
- Duane Martin; Preston C. Hall (1 episode)
- Erykah Badu; Herself (1 episode)
- Evan Ross; Himself (1 episode; not credited)
- Harry Lennix; Earl (1 episode)
- Hosea Chanchez; Malik Wright (1 episode)
- Isaac Hayes; Eugene Childs (2 episodes)
- Idris Elba; Paul (1 episode)
- Jackie Collins; Herself (1 episode)
- James Avery; Dr. Couch (1 episode)
- Jenifer Lewis; Veretta Childs (7 episodes)
- Jennifer Baxter; Kelly Pitts (1 episode)
- Jill Scott; Donna Williams (4 episodes)
- Joan Pringle; Carol Clayton (3 Episodes)
- Joe Torry; Mel (2 episodes)
- Jo Marie Payton; Annette Miles (2 episodes)
- John L. Adams; Vosco (7 episodes)
- John Salley; Byron (1 episode)
- Jonelle Allen; Eleanor Charles (1 episode)
- Kadeem Hardison; Eldon Parks (3 episodes)
- Karen Austin; Sandy Bickle (3 episodes)
- Katt Williams; Rick Beatty (1 episode)
- Kellie Shanygne Williams; Cecily (2 episodes)
- Kelly Rowland; Tammy (3 episodes)
- Kelsey Grammer; Himself (1 episode)
- Kenya Moore; Kara (2 episodes)
- Kimberly Elise; Reesie Jackson (2 episodes)
- Kurt Loder; Himself (1 episode)
- Laila Ali; Herself (1 episode)
- Laivan Greene; Herself (1 episode; not credited)
- Lawrence Hilton-Jacobs; Leonard James (1 episode)
- Lil' Zane; Himself (1 episode)
- Loretta Devine; Judge Vashti Jackson (2 episodes)
- Malik Yoba; Brock Harris (8 episodes)
- Marcia Clark; Herself (1 episode)
- Master P; Himself (1 episode)
- Melvin Van Peebles; Kenneth (1 episode)
- Michael Warren; Bill Clayton (2 episodes)
- Mo'Nique; Herself (1 episode)
- Orlando Jones; Dr. Lucas (1 episode)
- Omarosa Manigault-Stallworth; Trina (1 episode)
- Phil Morris; Dr. Clay Spencer (4 episodes)
- Pooch Hall; Derwin Davis (1 episode)
- Quddus Phillipe; Xander (2 episodes)
- Reverend Al Sharpton; Himself (2 episodes)
- Richard T. Jones; Aaron (10 episodes)
- Rockmond Dunbar; Jalen (4 episodes)
- Rhonda Ross Kendrick; Laurie (Halloween party guest) (1 episode)
- Sandra Bernhard; Marcia (1 episode)
- Saul Williams; Sivad (6 episodes)
- Shar Jackson; Niecy (1 episode)
- Shanti Lowry; Dionne Marie Taylor (1 episode)
- Sinbad; Himself (1 episode)
- Steven Cojocaru; Taz (1 episode)
- Suzanne de Passe; Herself (1 episode)
- Tasha Smith; Shandara Duranni (1 episode)
- Terrell Davis; Himself (1 episode)
- Terri J. Vaughn; Tasha (1 episode)
- Tia Mowry; Melanie Barnett (2 episodes)
- Traci Bingham; Candy (1 episode)
- Tracy Vilar; GiGi (1 episode)
- Tricky; Finn (4 episodes)
- Una Damon; Myoshi (1 episode)
- Wayne Brady; Derek Tyler (4 episodes)
- Wendy Raquel Robinson; Tasha Mack (1 episode)
- Wendell Pierce; Anthony Jackson (1 episode)

== Awards and nominations ==
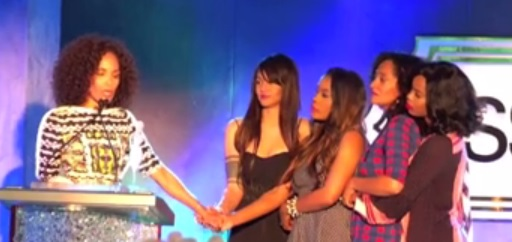
The cast of Girlfriends honoring the show creator with her 2013 Essence "Visionary" award. Left to right: Mara Brock Akil, Persia White, Golden Brooks, Tracee Ellis Ross, Jill Marie Jones.

Year	Award	Category	Recipient
2005	BET Comedy Award	Outstanding Writing for a Comedy Series	Mara Brock Akil, Mark Alton Brown, Veronica Chambers, Tim Edwards, Karin Gist, Dee LaDuke, Regina Y. Hicks, Kevin Marburger, Michele Marburger, Prentice Penny, and Shauna Robinson
2005	BET Comedy Award	Outstanding Lead Actress in a Comedy Series	Tracee Ellis Ross (nominated)
2005	NAACP Image Awards	Outstanding Supporting Actor in a Comedy Series	Reginald C. Hayes
2006	NAACP Image Awards	Outstanding Supporting Actor in a Comedy Series	Reginald C. Hayes
2007	NAACP Image Awards	Outstanding Supporting Actor in a Comedy Series	Reginald C. Hayes
2007	NAACP Image Awards	Outstanding Actress in a Comedy Series	Tracee Ellis Ross
2009	NAACP Image Awards	Outstanding Actress in a Comedy Series	Tracee Ellis Ross

== Spin-off ==
"The Game", a 2006 episode of Girlfriends, features guest star Tia Mowry as Joan's cousin Melanie Barnett, an aspiring medical student who wants to give up her future to follow her professional athlete boyfriend to San Diego. That episode was the launching pad for The Game, a spin-off series, which was canceled by The CW television network. In April 2010, BET announced that it would pick up the series, which aired new episodes until the August 5, 2015 series finale. When the fourth season of The Game premiered in 2011 it received 7.7 million viewers, which at the time of its airing, made the show the most watched sitcom premiere in cable television history. In November 2021, a revival spin-off of the series was picked up and released to Paramount+, serving as a direct sequel from the original series and was promoted as a refreshed series (rebooted and marketed as season 1) while also subsequently continuing the overall total seasons (chronicled as season 10). The new inception continues where it left off from the 2015 finale a few years later switching gears set in the new location of Las Vegas with the new protagonists of reprised characters, chronicling Tasha Mack and her struggles of being a woman of color sports agent; while her son Malik Wright learns to make important decisions in his sports career while quietly battling mental health issues and Brittany Pitts who is navigating her adult life taking on serious financial hardships and responsibilities becoming independent away from her Pro-Football dad's (Jason Pitts) image and inheritance. The revived series also introduces new characters to the storyline. The reboot has also garnered favorable and positive reviews from media outlets.

== Home media ==
DVD name	Release date	No.	Additional features
The First Season	February 27, 2007	22	N/A
The Second Season	October 9, 2007	22	We All Fall Down: A Closer Look at "Trick or Truth?"; Creating the Show; Getting the Girls Together; Episode Guide
The Third Season	February 12, 2008	25	It's What You Wear That Counts; Here Comes the Bride: An Invitation Inside "The Wedding"
The Fourth Season	July 29, 2008	24	N/A
The Fifth Season	October 28, 2008	22	N/A
The Sixth Season	February 24, 2009	22	Includes the backdoor pilot of The Game
The Seventh Season	October 13, 2009	22	Mara Brock Akil Comments on: I Want My Baby Back; Hot for Preacher; Time to Man Up; Willie Or Won't He III: This Time It's Personal; What Had Happened Was...
The Eighth and Final Season	January 19, 2010	13	Bonus Episode from The Game: "Away Game"

== Soundtrack ==
Girlfriends: The Soundtrack

Soundtrack album by Various artists
- Released: May 26, 2008
- Genre: R&B
- Length: 48:09
- Label: Koch Records
- Producer: Larry Robinson

=== Track listing ===
1. Erykah Badu – "Vibrate On" (4:14)
2. Jill Scott – "Golden" (3:52)
3. Angie Stone – "Wish I Didn't Miss You" (4:32)
4. Corinne Bailey Rae – "Put Your Records On" (3:35)
5. Algebra – "I Know" (3:57)
6. Amy Winehouse – "Stronger Than Me" (3:42)
7. Estelle – "All Comes Back to You" (3:22)
8. Chrisette Michele – "Girl Respect Yourself" (3:44)
9. Chaka Khan featuring Mary J. Blige – "Disrespectful" (4:46)
10. India.Arie – "I Am Not My Hair" (3:48)
11. Dre – "Soulmate" (4:22)
12. Persia White – "Choices" (2:47)
13. Lira – "Feel Good" (5:15)

== Streaming ==
The series is available to stream on The CW's free digital-only network, CW Seed. The entire series began streaming on Netflix on September 11, 2020 to commemorate the show's 20th anniversary.

== General sources ==
- "Girlfriends: Show Summary". TV.COM. Archived from the original on July 1, 2005.
- Ferguson, Douglas. "History of TV Prime Time". Personal Webpage, Department of Communication, College of Charleston.
