= 6th Annual Black Reel Awards =

Film-industry awards in 2005

6th Black Reel Awards
- Date: February 19, 2005
- Location: Washington, D.C.

The 2005 Black Reel Awards, which annually recognize and celebrate the achievements of black people in feature, independent and television films, took place in Washington, D.C., on February 19, 2005. Ray and Redemption: The Stan Tookie Williams Story were the big winners during the ceremony, picking up five awards each.

== Winners and nominees ==
Winners are listed first and highlighted in bold.

| Best Film, Drama | Best Film, Comedy / Musical |
|---|---|
| **Ray**; Baadasssss!; I, Robot | **Lightning in a Bottle**; Barbershop 2: Back in Business; Fade to Black |
| Best Director | Best Original Score |
| **Mario Van Peebles – Baadasssss!**; Ernest Dickerson – Never Die Alone; Antoine Fuqua – Lightning in a Bottle; Spike Lee – She Hate Me; Charles Stone III – Mr. 3000 | **Ray Charles and Stephen Altman – Ray**; Terence Blanchard – She Hate Me; RZA – Kill Bill: Volume 2 |
| Best Actor, Drama | Best Actor, Comedy / Musical |
| **Jamie Foxx – Ray**; Don Cheadle – Hotel Rwanda; Mario Van Peebles – Baadasssss! | **Bernie Mac – Mr. 3000**; Jamie Foxx – Breakin' All the Rules; Ice Cube – Barbershop 2: Back in Business |
| Best Actress, Drama | Best Actress, Comedy / Musical |
| **Sophie Okonedo – Hotel Rwanda**; Regina King – Ray; Kerry Washington – Ray | **Irma P. Hall – The Ladykillers**; Angela Bassett – Mr. 3000; Gabrielle Union – Breakin' All the Rules |
| Best Supporting Actor | Best Supporting Actress |
| **Jamie Foxx – Collateral**; Cedric the Entertainer – Barbershop 2: Back in Business; Morgan Freeman – Million Dollar Baby; Clifton Powell – Ray; Jeffrey Wright – The Manchurian Candidate | **Sharon Warren – Ray**; Joy Bryant – Baadasssss!; Kimberly Elise – The Manchurian Candidate; Nia Long – Alfie; Jada Pinkett Smith – Collateral |
| Best Screenplay, Adapted or Original | Best Breakthrough Performance |
| **Mario Van Peebles – Baadasssss!**; Michael Genet and Spike Lee – She Hate Me; Shonda Rhimes – The Princess Diaries 2: Royal Engagement; Don D. Scott – Barbershop 2: Back in Business; James L. White – Ray | **Sharon Warren – Ray**; Anthony Mackie – She Hate Me; C. J. Sanders – Ray |
| Best Television Miniseries or Movie | Outstanding Director in a Television Miniseries or Movie |
| **Something the Lord Made (HBO) – Robert W. Cort and Eric Hetzel**; Beah: A Black Woman Speaks (HBO) – Jonathan Demme and Joe Viola; Redemption: The Stan Tookie Williams Story (FX) – Sue Bugden and Rudy Langlais | **Vondie Curtis-Hall – Redemption: The Stan Tookie Williams Story (FX)**; Lisa Gay Hamilton – Beah: A Black Woman Speaks (HBO); Joseph Sargent – Something the Lord Made (HBO) |
| Best Actor in a TV Movie or Limited Series | Best Actress in a TV Movie or Limited Series |
| **Jamie Foxx – Redemption: The Stan Tookie Williams Story (FX)**; Mos Def – Something the Lord Made (HBO); Roger Guenveur Smith – Justice (Starz) | **Lynn Whitfield – Redemption: The Stan Tookie Williams Story (FX)**; Monica Calhoun – Justice (Starz); Anna Marie Horsford – Justice (Starz) |
| Best Supporting Actor in a TV Movie or Limited Series | Best Supporting Actress in a TV Movie or Limited Series |
| **Clayton LeBouef – Something the Lord Made (HBO)**; Reg E. Cathey – Everyday People (HBO); Stephen McKinley Henderson – Everyday People (HBO) | **C. C. H. Pounder – Redemption: The Stan Tookie Williams Story (FX)**; Iris Little-Thomas – Everyday People (HBO); Gabrielle Union – Something the Lord Made (HBO) |
| Outstanding Screenplay in a TV Movie or Limited Series | Best Original Television Program |
| **J.T. Allen – Redemption: The Stan Tookie Williams Story (FX)**; Lisa Gay Hamilton – Beah: A Black Woman Speaks (HBO); Jim McKay – Everyday People (HBO) | **America Beyond the Color Line with Henry Louis Gates Jr.**; Beyond Brown: Pursuing the Promise; The N-Word |
| Outstanding Independent Film | Outstanding Emerging Director |
| **The Woodsman – Nicole Kassell**; Motives – Craig Ross Jr.; Woman Thou Art Loosed – Michael Schultz | **Michael Schultz – Woman Thou Art Loosed**; Shawn Martinbrough and Milo Stone – Mindgame; Craig Ross Jr. – Motives |
| Outstanding Independent Film Actor | Outstanding Independent Film Actress |
| **Mos Def – The Woodsman**; Shemar Moore – Motives; Clifton Powell – Woman Thou Art Loosed | **Kimberly Elise – Woman Thou Art Loosed**; Golden Brooks – Motives; Eve – The Woodsman |
