= Aaron D. Spears =

American actor (born 1971)

- Born: Aaron Darnell Spears; July 10, 1971 (age 54); Washington, D.C., U.S
- Other name: Aaron Spears
- Occupation: Actor
- Years active: 1997–present

Aaron Darnell Spears (born July 10, 1971) is an American actor. He first portrayed Officer Washington on the short-lived series Sunset Beach and then he starred to have guest roles on numerous of television sitcoms and thus appearing in numerous of movies. Spears also had regular roles in other television sitcoms including Being Mary Jane, and the two daytime television soap operas such as The Bold and the Beautiful and Days of Our Lives and his portrayal of Money in the 2001 film Blue Hill Avenue opposite Allen Payne. He even had a recurring role in the sitcom Girlfriends' Guide to Divorce and is currently portraying Sgt. Lane on the sitcom The Black Hamptons.

== Biography ==
Spears was born in Washington, D.C. He studied computer science and mathematics at Delaware State University.

In 2001, Spears played "Money" in Craig Ross Jr.'s Blue Hill Avenue alongside Allen Payne, and Michael "Bear" Taliaferro. He portrays Justin Barber on the American soap opera The Bold and the Beautiful and Lt. Raines on soap opera Days of Our Lives and Mark Bradley in Being Mary Jane alongside Gabrielle Union as the title role. His previous television credits include guest roles on Bones, Criminal Minds, Shark and Everybody Loves Raymond. He had a guest starring role on the NCIS: Los Angeles episode "The Silo" on November 12, 2017. In 2024, Aaron D. Spears makes a thrilling return as Justin Barber on The Bold and the Beautiful. Back after a hiatus since 2022

== Filmography ==
=== Film ===
| Year | Title | Role | Notes |
|---|---|---|---|
| 1997 | End of the Tunnel | Drum | Short |
| 1998 | Cappuccino | Jack | |
| 2000 | 2 G's & a Key | Sad Dogg | Video |
| 2001 | Blue Hill Avenue | Money | |
| 2002 | Makin' Baby | Michael | |
| 2003 | Pretty Lady | Benjamin | |
| 2003 | Black Ball | Travis | |
| 2006 | Babel | Officer #2 | |
| 2007 | Traci Townsend | Dante | |
| 2007 | The Mannsfield 12 | Ali | |
| 2008 | Extra Ordinary Barry | Ray | |
| 2009 | I Love You, Man | Terrell | |
| 2009 | After the Storm | Perry | Short |
| 2010 | Disrupt/Dismantle | Andre Rhodes | |
| 2011 | 35 and Ticking | Officer Jones | |
| 2011 | The Gauntlet | Ace | Short |
| 2011 | Engagement | - | Short |
| 2012 | Back Then | Gavin Miller | |
| 2014 | Only Light | Vannie | Short |
| 2015 | If Not for His Grace | Pastor Fort | |
| 2015 | Stock Option | William | TV movie |
| 2016 | For the Love of Christmas | Langston Simms | |
| 2018 | Blink | Detective | Short |
| 2019 | London Mitchell's Christmas | London Mitchell | |
| 2020 | White People Money | Darryl, Executive Producer | |
| 2020 | TMI | Troy Michaels | Short |
| 2021 | Christmas for Sale | George Camden | TV movie |
| 2022 | A Christmas Gift | Pete | |
| 2022 | Noble Intentions | Mr. Green | |
| 2023 | A Wesley Christmas Wedding | Ted Jenkins | TV movie |

=== Television ===
| Year | Title | Role | Notes |
|---|---|---|---|
| 1997 | Sunset Beach | Officer Washington | Regular cast |
| 1999 | Pacific Blue | Roger Franklin | Episode: "Swimming in the Dead Pool" |
| 2000 | Arrest & Trial | Bruce Milsap | Episode: "Armored Car Murder" |
| 2001 | The District | Thief #1 / Undercover Cop | Episode: "Don't Fence Me In" |
| 2001 | Crossing Jordan | Seamus | Episode: "You Can't Go Home Again" |
| 2002 | The X-Files | Guard | Episode: "Underneath" |
| 2002 | Everybody Loves Raymond | Rick | Episode: "She's the One" |
| 2002 | CSI: Miami | Jerry, Police Diver | Episode: "A Horrible Mind" |
| 2003 | A.U.S.A. | Court Clerk | Episode: "Pilot" |
| 2003 | Half & Half | Hamilton Brooks | Episode: "The Big Phat Mouth Episode: Part 1 & 2" |
| 2003 | Coupling | Waiter | Episode: "Check/Mate" |
| 2003 | Angel | Security Guard #1 | Episode: "Destiny" |
| 2004 | The Division | Calvin Morse | Episode: "That's Them" |
| 2004 | General Hospital | Officer Watkins | Episode: "Episode dated 20 April 2004" |
| 2006 | Criminal Minds | Gerald Dupree | Episode: "The Fisher King: Part 1" |
| 2006 | Shark | Detective | Episode: "Russo" |
| 2006 | Bones | Agent Walt Sugarman | Episode: "The Woman in the Sand" |
| 2008 | Boston Legal | Terrence Maxwell | Episode: "Roe vs Wade: The Musical" |
| 2008 | Lincoln Heights | Rahsaan | Episode: "The New Wild Ones" |
| 2009–24 | The Bold and the Beautiful | Justin Barber | Regular cast |
| 2010 | Castle | Ike Thornton | Episode: "Den of Thieves" |
| 2011 | NCIS | Marine Major Michael Strickland | Episode: "Freedom" |
| 2013–15 | Being Mary Jane | Mark Bradley | Main cast: Season 1-3 |
| 2016 | This Is Us | Ray | Episode: "The Trip" |
| 2016–17 | Days of Our Lives | Commissioner Raines | Regular cast |
| 2017 | Greenleaf | Alonzo | Episode: "A House Divided" |
| 2017 | NCIS: Los Angeles | FBI Special Agent Mark Monroe | Episode: "The Silo" |
| 2018 | Girlfriends' Guide to Divorce | Leon | Recurring cast: Season 5 |
| 2018 | The Rookie | Mr. Campbell | Episode: "The Hawke" |
| 2020 | Two Degrees | Aaron | Episode: "Cigar Cave" |
| 2022–24 | The Black Hamptons | Sergeant Lane | Main cast |
