= Caryn Ward Ross =

American actress

Caryn Ward
- Occupations: Actress, dancer, choreographer and producer
- Years active: 1985–present
- Spouse: Craig Ross Jr. (m. 2011)

Caryn Ward Ross (née Ward) is an American actress, dancer, choreographer and producer.

== Life and career ==
Ward attended Howard University where she graduated with a degree in psychology. Ward also studied dance at Alvin Ailey American Dance Theater in New York City. She performed with various artists including Janet Jackson, Arsenio Hall, and Rosie Perez.

Ward began her career as a child actor in the 1980s, appearing in a recurring role in the musical-dance drama series Fame from 1985 to 1986. She later appeared in Webster, Paradise and Family Matters. From 1990 to 1991, she co-starred in the short-lived CBS sitcom You Take the Kids, starring Nell Carter. Ward later took ten year-break from acting and in 2000s, began appearing in episodes of Friends, Strong Medicine, The Shield, and Lincoln Heights. In 2004, she made her movie debut appearing in a supporting role in the thriller Motives, opposite Vivica A. Fox and Shemar Moore. She later appeared in several featuring films, including Boss'n Up (2005), Traci Townsend (2006), and N-Secure (2009). From 2006 to 2015, she had a recurring role in the CW/BET comedy series, The Game.

Ward starred and produced films The Affair (2014) and Zodiac Sign (2015). She starred in the short-lived Bounce TV sitcom Grown Folks in 2017, which was canceled after 13 episodes. In 2018, she received Indie Series Awards nomination for her performance in the Victoria Rowell comedy series The Rich and the Ruthless. Later in 2018, she so-created alongside her husband Craig Ross Jr., starred and produced Urban Movie Channel drama series Monogamy.

== Personal life ==
On June 26, 2011, Caryn Ward married television and film director Craig Ross, Jr.

== Filmography ==
=== Film ===
Year	Title	Role	Notes
1988	David	Jennifer	TV movie
2004	Motives	Gwendolyn	Video
2005	Boss'n Up	Dominique	
2006	Traci Townsend	Lynn	
2007	Tournament of Dreams	Nessa	
2007	Stompin'	Camille Turner	
2007	Blood River	Sheila	
2009	Think Twice	Jennifer	Short
2009	Breaking News	Kendra Davis	Short
2009	Sideline Confessions	Jade	Short
2009	Steppin: The Movie	Actor	
2010	Backyard Wedding	Jane	TV movie
2010	N-Secure	Kim	
2011	The Blackest Swan	Lily	Video
2011	The Bachelor Party	La-La	Video
2011	He's Mine Not Yours	Mandy	
2012	The Marriage Chronicles	Sabel Jones	
2012	If You Really Love Me	Tanya	TV movie
2012	Air Collision	Presidential Purser Joan Watts	Video
2014	Patterns of Attraction	Dr. Flowers	
2014	Daddy's Home	Stacy	TV movie
2014	Crossed the Line	Kyra	
2014	The Affair	Simone Waite	
2015	Zodiac Sign	Diana	
2016	36 Hour Layover	Tammy	
2016	For the Love of Christmas	Diana	
2016	LAPD African Cops	-	
2017	Message from a Mistress	Jamie Hall	
2022	Santa Games	Denise	
2023	Back on the Strip	Eve	
2024	Trope	Lisa	
2024	The Contract	Eva	

=== Television ===
Year	Title	Role	Notes
1985	Days of Our Lives	Tracy	Regular Cast
1985-86	Fame	Tina Johnson	Recurring Cast: Season 5, Guest: Season 6
1986	Webster	Tony	Episode: "The Big Sleepover"
1987	Disneyland	Emily	Episode: "The Liberators"
1988	What's Happening Now!!	Joyce	Episode: "The Fabulous Fortunes"
1989	Paradise	Sarah	Episode: "All the Pretty Little Horses"
1990	Family Matters	Susie	Episode: "Dedicated to the One I Love"
1990-91	You Take the Kids	Lorette Kirkland	Main Cast
2002	Friends	Waitress	Episode: "The One Where Joey Dates Rachel"
2004	The Bold and the Beautiful	Insomnia Waitress	Episode: "Episode #1.4389"
2004	Strong Medicine	-	Episode: "Selective Breeding"
2005	The Shield	Queenie	Episode: "String Theory"
2005	Full Plate	Host	Episode: "The Nanny"
2006-15	The Game	Erica Harrison	Recurring Cast: Season 1-4 & 8
2007	Lincoln Heights	Layla	Episode: "House Arrest" & "The 'F' Word"
2007	Entourage	Hostess	Episode: "Sorry, Harvey"
2010	Love That Girl!	Sexy Lexi	Episode: "Keep It in the Closet"
2012-14	Roomieloverfriends	Calista	Recurring Cast: Season 1-3
2014	One Love	Jenika	Recurring Cast
2015	Liv and Maddie	Cindy Dippledorf	Episode: "Neighbors-A-Rooney"
2015	Sexless	Calista	Episode: "Surfboard"
2016	Jane the Virgin	Customer #2	Episode: "Chapter Forty-One"
2016	Pitch	Reporter #2	Episode: "San Francisco"
2017	Grown Folks	Brenda Finley	Main Cast
2017-21	The Rich and the Ruthless	Roxanne	Recurring Cast: Season 1, Main Cast: Season 4
2018	Lucifer	Emily Armantrout	Episode: "High School Poppycock"
2018-21	Monogamy	Sincere	Main Cast
2022-23	Hush	Jordan	Main Cast
2024-25	Mind Your Business	Kimberly Williams	Main Cast

=== Music Video ===
Year	Song title	Artist	Role
2010	"She"	Eric Roberson	Love Interest
