= Monogamy (TV series) =

American web television drama series

- Genre: Drama
- Created by: Craig Ross Jr.; Caryn Ward Ross
- Starring: Jill Marie Jones; Brian J. White; Vanessa Simmons; Darius McCrary; Wesley Jonathan; Caryn Ward Ross; Blue Kimble; Chrystee Pharris
- Composers: Gregory De Iulio; Nelson K.Johnson; Jawaan "Madman" Lowery
- Country of origin: United States
- Original language: English
- No. of seasons: 3
- No. of episodes: 18

Production
- Executive producers: Craig Ross Jr.; Jill Marie Jones; Matthew Helderman; Wesley Jonathan; Blue Kimble; Darius McCrary; Angela Northington; Patrick Peters; Chrystee Pharris; Vanessa Simmons; Luke Taylor; Caryn Ward; Brian J. White
- Producers: Rodney Gumbo King; Tamika Lamison
- Camera setup: Ruperto Luis Sanchez
- Running time: 30 minutes

Original release
- Network: Urban Movie Channel; Allblk
- Release: May 4, 2018 – present

Craig Ross Jr.'s Monogamy is an American television drama series created by Craig Ross Jr. and his wife Caryn Ward Ross. The series follows four married couples and their unconventional form of therapy with the hopes of reviving their failing relationships. It starring ensemble cast includes Jill Marie Jones, Brian J. White, Vanessa Simmons, Darius McCrary, Wesley Jonathan, Caryn Ward Ross, Blue Kimble and Chrystee Pharris. The writing staff includes Tamika Lamison, Cleve Lamison, Kelvin Foster, Shannan E. Johnson, Caryn Ward Ross and Craig Ross Jr.

The first season premiered on the streaming service Urban Movie Channel on May 4, 2018. On March 28, 2019, the series was renewed for the second season. The series was renewed for the third season premiering in 2021. According to UMC, Monogamy is the streamer's most popular program. In 2020, the series premiered on Netflix worldwide outside the United States.

== Cast and characters ==
- Jill Marie Jones as Maggie Baker
- Brian J. White as Dallas
- Vanessa Simmons as Caroline
- Darius McCrary as Connor
- Wesley Jonathan as Carson
- Caryn Ward Ross as Sincere
- Blue Kimble as Sawyer
- Chrystee Pharris as Diandra

== Episodes ==
Season	Episodes	Originally released		
Season	Episodes	First released	Last released	Network
1	6	May 4, 2018	June 7, 2018	Urban Movie Channel
2	6	November 14, 2019	December 19, 2019	Urban Movie Channel
3	6	September 2, 2021	September 30, 2021	Allblk

=== Season 1 (2018) ===
No. overall	No. in season	Title	Directed by	Written by	Original release date
1	1	"To Thine Own Self"	Craig Ross Jr.	Craig Ross Jr.	May 4, 2018
2	2	"Out of the Frying Pan"	Craig Ross Jr.	Tamika Lamison	May 11, 2018
3	3	"Let Your Hands Go"	Craig Ross Jr.	Kevin Foster	May 18, 2018
4	4	"Truth or Consequences"	Craig Ross Jr.	Kevin Foster	May 24, 2018
5	5	"Loves Me, Loves Me Not"	Craig Ross Jr.	Tamika Lamison	May 31, 2018
6	6	"Decisions"	Craig Ross Jr.	Craig Ross Jr.	June 7, 2018

=== Season 2 (2019) ===
No. overall	No. in season	Title	Directed by	Written by	Original release date
7	1	"Should I Stay, or Should I Go?"	Craig Ross Jr.	Tamika Lamison	November 14, 2019
8	2	"It Ain't Over Til It's Over"	Craig Ross Jr.	Kevin Foster	November 21, 2019
9	3	"Unspoken Agendas"	Craig Ross Jr.	Cleve Lamison	November 27, 2019
10	4	"Once Upon a Time In Vegas"	Craig Ross Jr.	Cleve Lamison	December 5, 2019
11	5	"The Decision Remix"	Craig Ross Jr.	Kevin Foster	December 12, 2019
12	6	"Grass is Greener"	Craig Ross Jr.	Tamika Lamison	December 19, 2019

=== Season 3 (2021) ===
No. overall	No. in season	Title	Directed by	Written by	Original release date
13	1	"Hit Me With Your Best Shot"	Craig Ross Jr.	Tamika Lamison	September 2, 2021
14	2	"Life is Like Monkey Bars"	Craig Ross Jr.	Kevin Foster	September 2, 2021
15	3	"The Bridge"	Craig Ross Jr.	Shannan E. Johnson	September 9, 2021
16	4	"The Questions We Ask"	Craig Ross Jr.	Cleve Lamison and Caryn Ward	September 16, 2021
17	5	"Todays Choice is Tomorrows Consequence"	Craig Ross Jr.	Kevin Foster	September 23, 2021
18	6	"Divine Intervention"	Craig Ross Jr.	Tamika Lamison	September 30, 2021
