= Life (1999 film) =

1999 film by Ted Demme

- Theatrical release poster
- Directed by: Ted Demme
- Written by: Robert Ramsey; Matthew Stone
- Produced by: Brian Grazer; Eddie Murphy
- Starring: Eddie Murphy; Martin Lawrence
- Cinematography: Geoffrey Simpson
- Edited by: Jeffrey Wolf
- Music by: Wyclef Jean
- Production company: Imagine Entertainment
- Distributed by: Universal Pictures
- Release date: April 16, 1999
- Running time: 109 minutes
- Country: United States
- Language: English
- Budget: $80 million
- Box office: $73.4 million

Life is a 1999 American buddy comedy-drama film directed by Ted Demme. The film stars Eddie Murphy and Martin Lawrence. It is the second film featuring Murphy and Lawrence together (the first being Boomerang, in 1992). The supporting cast includes Ned Beatty, R. Lee Ermey, Obba Babatundé, Bernie Mac, Anthony Anderson, Miguel A. Núñez Jr., Bokeem Woodbine, Guy Torry, Michael Taliferro and Barry Shabaka Henley.

The film is framed as a story being told by an elderly inmate about two of his friends, Ray Gibson (Murphy) and Claude Banks (Lawrence), who are both wrongfully convicted of murder and sentenced to life in prison.

It received an Oscar nomination for Best Makeup at the 72nd Academy Awards. Life was released by Universal Pictures on April 16, 1999. The film was considered to be a box office bomb as it only grossed $73.4 million against an $80 million budget, and received mixed reviews from critics. The film later found a strong cult following among Murphy and Lawrence's fans, establishing Life as a cult classic.

== Plot ==
In 1997, at the Mississippi State Penitentiary, elderly convict Willie Long tells two inmates his friends' life stories at their burial. Ray Gibson and Claude Banks, vastly different New Yorkers, meet at the club Spanky's in 1932. Small-time thief Ray nicks Claude's wallet, who had just been cleaned out by debt collectors, as a mark in a bathroom.

Ray convinces Spanky to allow them to pay off their debts via bootlegging in the South, where they experience racial actions and are denied service at Whites Only businesses. Buying Mississippi "hooch" down south, they stop in a local bar. Ray claims to own a club called “Ray’s Boom Boom Room” in Manhattan, later admitting it only exists in his mind, but expressing ultimately that dreams begin in the mind; the Boom Boom Room becomes a recurring theme throughout the film.

Ray loses his father's prized pocket watch in a poker game to card hustler Winston Hancock, and Claude gives their last 2 dollars to a prostitute named Sylvia. Outside, racist sheriff Warren Pike demands Hancock leave town, but Hancock strikes Pike in the face, leaving a scar. Pike then kills Hancock, takes Ray's pocket watch, and frames Ray and Claude for the murder.

Despite their innocence, Ray and Claude receive life sentences at the infamous hard labor Camp 8. They immediately clash with the guards and meet fellow inmates Jangle Leg (who hits on Claude), Willie Long, Biscuit (who is involved with Jangle Leg), Radio, Goldmouth (who picks a fight with Ray, but later befriends him), Cookie the chef, and Pokerface.

Claude's attorney cousin loses his appeal, then seduces his girlfriend. With no chance at freedom, Claude and Ray break out, reaching Tallahatchie before being recaptured.

12 years later, Claude and Ray meet young, mute inmate nicknamed "Can't-Get-Right", a talented baseball player scouted by a Negro league official and is offered a pardon to play. Sensing an opportunity for freedom, Ray and Claude introduce themselves as his handlers.

Daughter of Camp 8's Superintendent Abernathy, Mae Rose, often distracts impressive baseball player, Can't-Get-Right, and eventually gives birth to a mulatto boy. Seeing that the child appears Afro-American, Superintendent Abernathy (Rose’s father), demands to know which inmate has fathered the child. All present inmates gradually claim to be the father, embarrassing Abernathy; the inmates laugh and Abernathy shamefully quits immediately.

At a dance social, Biscuit confides to Ray that he is due for release but fears his family will not accept his homosexuality. Despite Ray's sincere encouragement, Biscuit commits suicide by crossing the gun line, to the other inmates' shock and heartache.

Can't-Get-Right is soon released without Ray and Claude, which causes extreme frustration and a bitter falling out between them, ending their friendship. Over the following years, Ray attempts several lone escapes unsuccessfully.

By 1972, Ray and Claude are still not speaking to each other; all their friends but Willie have either died or been released. One day, Claude snaps, running past the gun line to steal a pie and feast on it, and his punishment is to stand barefoot on a case of glass bottles. Dillard offers to set Ray free if he will shoot Claude should he move. He refuses as he makes a provocative statement toward the Guard Captain, so he is given the same punishment. Touched, Claude apologizes, and they finally make amends.

Ray and Claude are transferred to live and work at Superintendent Dexter Wilkins' mansion. Ray does yard work, while Claude works inside and befriends the sympathetic Wilkins, who was set to retire. Claude is entrusted to pick up the new superintendent, former Sheriff Warren Pike.

While on a pheasant hunt one day, Ray confronts Pike upon seeing him wearing his father's watch and the scar on his cheek, realizing he framed them 40 years ago. Pike then recognizes Ray and threatens to kill him. Ray points Pike's shotgun at him, explaining to Wilkins that Pike framed them for murder. The sheriff admits it with no remorse. Furious, Claude tries to take the gun from Ray and kill Pike himself, while Pike pulls a hidden Derringer on them. Realizing they are innocent and disgusted with Pike, Wilkins kills him, calling it a hunting accident. Avenged, Ray reclaims the watch. Wilkins apologizes for their unjust imprisonment, promising to issue them pardons, but suffers a fatal heart attack before he can.

In 1997, present day, Ray and Claude live in the prison infirmary with Willie. Claude tells Ray of a new plan, which Ray initially rejects, but then follows Claude to hear more. That night, the infirmary catches fire, and they seemingly perish. The inmates are saddened by the story, and Willie then reveals that Ray and Claude planted two bodies from the morgue in their beds, started the blaze, then escaped in the fire trucks.

Ray and Claude immediately return to NYC and go to a Yankees game. Free, they are happily living together in Harlem.

== Cast ==
- Eddie Murphy as Rayford "Ray" Gibson
- Martin Lawrence as Claude Banks
- Obba Babatundé as Willie Long
- Ned Beatty as Dexter Wilkins
- Bernie Mac as "Jangle Leg"
- Miguel A. Núñez Jr. as "Biscuit"
- Clarence Williams III as Winston Hancock
- Barry Shabaka Henley as "Pokerface"
- Brent Jennings as Bob "Hoppin' Bob"
- Guy Torry as "Radio"
- Nick Cassavetes as Sergeant Dillard
- Bokeem Woodbine as "Can't-Get-Right"
- Anthony Anderson as "Cookie"
- Michael Taliferro as "Goldmouth"
- Sanaa Lathan as Daisy
- O'Neal Compton as Superintendent Abernathy
- Noah Emmerich as Stan Blocker
- R. Lee Ermey as Older Sheriff Pike
  - Ned Vaughn as Younger Sheriff Pike
- Heavy D as Jake
- Kenn Whitaker as Isaac
- Bonz Malone as Leon
- Lisa Nicole Carson as Sylvia
- Poppy Montgomery as Older Mae Rose
- Johnny Brown as Blind Reverend Clay
- Don Harvey as Billy Bob
- Rick James as "Spanky"
- Leon Turner as "Arm That Went Up" (uncredited)

== Production ==
In July 1996, it was announced Eddie Murphy would star in the buddy comedy Life. The film was the result of a pitch Murphy gave to Brian Grazer, whom Murphy previously worked with on The Nutty Professor. The film was the first of a two-movie deal between Murphy and Imagine Entertainment, the second being Bowfinger.

Although Life is set in Parchman, Mississippi, it was filmed in California. Filming locations in the Los Angeles area included Downey and Norwalk, in addition to the Universal Pictures backlot. Locations in northern California included Sacramento, Brentwood, and Locke. Filming took place from March to June 1998.

== Reception ==
=== Box office ===
Life was released on April 16, 1999, in North America. On its opening weekend, the film grossed $20,414,775. It would hold the record for having the biggest opening weekend for a non-sequel R-rated comedy until Me, Myself & Irene replaced it in June 2000. However, its gross the next weekend amounted to $11,257,995, and $6,481,175 in its third weekend. Its domestic run concluded with $63,886,029 for a worldwide total of $73,475,268, making it a massive financial disappointment.

=== Critical response ===
On Rotten Tomatoes, Life has an approval rating of 52% based on 58 reviews, with an average rating of 5.7/10. The site's critic consensus reads, "Entertaining if not over-the-top humor from a solid comic duo provides plenty of laughs." On Metacritic, it has a weighted average score of 63 out of 100, indicating "generally favorable" reviews. Audiences surveyed by CinemaScore gave the film an average grade of "B+" on an A+ to F scale.

Janet Maslin of The New York Times gave a positive review, writing "Lawrence and Murphy make an entertaining team", and noting "Murphy in particular develops a more substantial personality than might be expected here. As he evolves affectingly from a fast-talking hotshot into an old man with the growl and gait of a venerable blues singer, he seems to be reaching for a greater acting opportunity than this lightweight material can offer. It's a performance that feels solid even when the film is at its most formulaic, or when it vacillates strangely."

Since its release, the film has gained a strong cult following, with Elliot Smith of Entertainment Weekly classifying it as one of Murphy's best:

A surprisingly touching buddy comedy-drama that both lives up to and subverts audience expectations, Life has become a cult classic over the past 20-plus years, showing the artistic range of stars Murphy and Martin Lawrence. The film is greatly aided by the steady hand of director Ted Demme, who gives his actors both freedom to shine while also reining in their overwrought impulses.

=== Accolades ===
- Academy Awards
  - nominated, Rick Baker for Best Makeup (1999)
- NAACP Image Award
  - nominated for Outstanding Motion Picture (2000)
- BMI Film & TV Awards
  - (won) for Most Performed Song from a Film (2000)
- Blockbuster Entertainment Awards
  - nominated with Eddie Murphy for Favorite Comedy Team (2000) for the movie
  - nominated for Favorite Song from a Movie (Fortunate)

== Soundtrack ==
A soundtrack containing hip hop and R&B music was released on March 16, 1999, on Rock Land/Interscope Records. It peaked at 10 on the Billboard 200 and 2 on the Top R&B/Hip-Hop Albums and was certified platinum with over 1 million copies sold on June 18, 1999.
