= You Take the Kids =

American television sitcom

- Genre: Sitcom
- Created by: Paul Haggis; Stephen Nathan
- Directed by: Peter Baldwin; Frank Bonner; Paul Haggis; Marcia L. Leslie; William Levinson; J.D. Lobue
- Starring: Nell Carter; Roger E. Mosley; Dante Beze; Caryn Ward; Marlon Taylor; Trent Cameron; Leila Danette
- Theme music composer: Jeff Moss
- Opening theme: "Nobody's Got It Easy" performed by Nell Carter
- Country of origin: United States
- Original language: English
- No. of seasons: 1
- No. of episodes: 6 (1 unaired)

Production
- Executive producer: Paul Haggis
- Cinematography: Bill Williams
- Camera setup: Multi-camera
- Running time: 30 minutes
- Production companies: CBS Entertainment Productions; Paul Haggis Productions; MTM Enterprises

Original release
- Network: CBS
- Release: December 15, 1990 – January 12, 1991

You Take the Kids is an American sitcom television series that aired on CBS from December 15, 1990, to January 12, 1991. The series starred Nell Carter, who also performed the theme song "Nobody's Got It Easy". You Take the Kids, which was perceived as being the black answer to Roseanne due to its portrayal of a working-class African-American family, featured Carter as a crass, no-nonsense mother and wife. The series also marked Nell Carter's return to a series since Gimme a Break! concluded its sixth-season run on NBC in 1987.

== Synopsis ==
Carter stars as Nell Kirkland, the opinionated matriarch of a blue collar African American family living in Pittsburgh, Pennsylvania. Nell's husband Michael (Roger E. Mosley) worked as a school bus driver while Nell gave piano lessons at the family home for extra money. Nell and Michael had four children: eldest son Raymond (Dante Beze), boy-crazy daughter Lorette (Caryn Ward), 12-year-old Peter (Marlon Taylor), and 10-year-old Nate (Trent Cameron). In addition to the kids, Nell and Michael also had to contend with Nell's equally opinionated mother Helen (Leila Danette), who lived in the basement.

== Cast ==
- Nell Carter as Nell Kirkland
- Roger E. Mosley as Michael Kirkland, Nell's husband
- Dante Beze as Raymond Kirkland, Nell & Michael's first son
- Caryn Ward as Lorette Kirkland, Nell & Michael's daughter
- Marlon Taylor as Peter Kirkland, Nell & Michael's second son
- Trent Cameron as Nate Kirkland, Nell & Michael's third son
- Leila Danette as Helen, Nell's mother

== Production ==
The series was scheduled on Saturdays at 8pm (EST). It was canceled after six episodes (five were aired, but the sixth was pre-empted by CBS' special coverage of the Gulf War).

== Episodes ==
No.	Title	Directed by	Written by	Original release date	Prod. code	Viewers (millions)
1	"Pilot"	Paul Haggis	Paul Haggis & Stephen Nathan	December 15, 1990	1458	12.5
Nell and Michael's plans for a romantic weekend getaway are complicated by Nate's new job: delivering stolen car stereos.
2	"Merry Christmas to All and a Pointy Hat to You"	Frank Bonner	Paul Haggis & Stephen Nathan	December 22, 1990	0707	10.5
The Kirklands' Christmas tree and presents are stolen by a homeless family.
3	"The Eggs and I"	J. D. Lobue	Kathy Slevin	December 29, 1990	0704	8.2
Nell and Michael get the wrong idea when Lorette is partnered with a classmate (Larenz Tate) in a school parenting project caring for eggs.
4	"Fishes Are Like Sisters...You Can't Flush Them Without Feeling Guilty"	Peter Baldwin	Paul Haggis & Stephen Nathan	January 5, 1991	0706	9.7
Lorette asks Raymond's cool friend Spunk (Carl Anthony Payne II) to the school dance, where he and his other friends plan to humiliate her. Meanwhile, Nate tries to do away with an unwanted goldfish.
5	"What I Did for Love"	J.D. Lobue	William Levinson	January 12, 1991	0709	11.6
Raymond borrows money from high school loan shark Dewayne to take out the most materialistic girl in school and then steals to repay his debt.
6	"Bad Boy"	J.D. Lobue	Marcia L. Leslie	Unaired	0711	N/A
Peter steals the family car in hopes of finally getting his parents' attention.
