= N-Secure =

- Directed by: David M. Matthews
- Written by: Julius Lewis
- Produced by: Valerie Enloe; Bryce Southard
- Starring: Essence Atkins; Denise Boutte; Tempestt Bledsoe; Elise Neal; Caryn Ward; Toni Trucks; Nephew Tommy; Lamman Rucker
- Cinematography: Andy Dean
- Edited by: Bryce Southard
- Music by: Marc Ellis
- Distributed by: Bluff City Films; Freestyle Releasing
- Release date: October 15, 2010
- Running time: 115 minutes
- Language: English
- Budget: $1.6 million
- Box office: $2,595,644

N-Secure is a 2010 American crime thriller film, directed by David M. Matthews. The film stars Essence Atkins, Denise Boutte and Lamman Rucker.

== Cast ==
- Cordell Moore ... David Alan Washington
- Essence Atkins ... Robin Joyner
- Denise Boutte ... Tina Simpson
- Lamman Rucker ... Isaac Roberts
- Rick Ravanello ... Joe Hooks
- Tempestt Bledsoe ... Jill
- Caryn Ward ... Kim
- Elise Neal ... Leslie
- Toni Trucks ... Denise
- BernNadette Stanis ... Dr. Heather
- Nephew Tommy ... Papa Ray

== Box office ==
In its opening weekend, N-Secure made $1.17 million at 486 locations. The total gross for the film was $2,595,644
