= Traci Townsend =

- DVD cover
- Directed by: Craig Ross Jr.
- Written by: Bobby Thompson
- Produced by: Bobby Thompson; Cheryl Bedford; Fred Lewis; Mark Holdom
- Starring: Jazsmin Lewis; Mari Morrow; Richard T. Jones; Victor Williams; Marlon Young
- Cinematography: Carl Bartels
- Edited by: Craig Ross Jr.
- Music by: Geno Young
- Distributed by: Warner Home Video
- Release date: June 10, 2006 (Boston International Film Festival)
- Running time: 87 minutes
- Country: United States
- Language: English

Traci Townsend is a 2006 comedy film directed by Craig Ross Jr. and starring Jazsmin Lewis and Mari Morrow. It was written by Bobby Thompson, who was also a producer of the film.

== Premise ==
A beautiful and successful journalist interviews her three previous boyfriends to find out why they never proposed. Each distinctly different interview comically teaches Traci more about herself than she would care to know.

== Cast ==
- Jazsmin Lewis as Traci Townsend
- Mari Morrow as Sylvia
- Richard T. Jones as Travis
- Jay Acovone as Jesse "The Boss"
- Victor Williams as Darrell
- Suzanne Whang as Rosa
- Marlon Young as Pierre
- Amy Hunter as Vick
- Aaron D. Spears as Dante
- Myquan Jackson as Jay

== Accolades ==
2006 Boston International Film Festival

- Best Acting Performance — Jazsmin Lewis (winner)

2006 Hollywood Black Film Festival

- Audience Choice Award (winner)
