= Mel Jackson =

American actor (born 1970)

- Born: October 13, 1970 (age 55); Chicago, Illinois, U.S.
- Occupation: Actor
- Years active: 1995–present

Mel Jackson (born October 13, 1970) is an American actor. He is known for his roles in Living Single (1997–98), Soul Food (1997), The Temptations (1998), Deliver Us from Eva (2003), and Abduction of Jesse Bookman (2008).

== Career ==
Jackson made his first big screen appearance in the 1997 film Soul Food, and since has appeared in films such as Deliver Us from Eva, The Temptations, Uninvited Guest, Motives, and Flip the Script. He played the role of Tripp on Living Single during the sitcom's final season.

== Filmography ==
=== Film ===
Year	Film	Role
1997	Soul Food	Simuel St.James
1999	Uninvited Guest	Howard
2000	Dancing in September	Malik
2001	Automatic	Doorman (uncredited)
2003	Deliver Us from Eva	Tim
2004	Love on Layaway	Anthony
2004	Motives	Det. Morgan
2005	Friends and Lovers	Richard
2005	Flip the Script	Bruce
2006	Where Is Love Waiting	Darren
2007	Motives 2	Det. Morgan
2008	A Good Man Is Hard to Find	Jasper King
2008	The Abduction of Jesse Bookman	Jesse Bookman
2008	The Stick Up Kids	Pennell
2011	The Truth	
2011	Dreams	Mia's Father
2012	The Marriage Chronicles	Dr.Tim
2012	If You Really Love Me	
2012	To Love and to Cherish	Jay
2014	Four Seasons	Colin
2015	Fear Flies	
2015	Civilian Life	Commander Jamison

=== Television ===
Year	Title	Role	Notes
1996	To Sir, with Love II	Tommy Rahwn	TV Movie
1996	The Parent 'Hood	Ahmad Zaire	Episode: "The Critic"
1997	NYPD Blue	Jermaine Brewer	Episode: "Bad Rap"
1997	George Wallace	Eddie	TV Movie
1997	Hitz	Sid	Episode: "Pilot"
1997–98	Living Single	Ira Lee "Tripp" Williams III	13 episodes
1997–99	In the House	Graham Parks	6 episodes
1998	The Temptations	Norman Whitfield	TV Movie
1999	Vengeance Unlimited	Jay Jackson	Episode: "Confidence"
1999	The Jamie Foxx Show	Kenny	Episode: "Why Don't We Just Roll Reversal"
2000–01	DAG	Agent Morton	17 episodes
2000	Playing with Fire		TV Movie
2000	Little Richard	Robert Blackwell	TV Movie
2000	The Steve Harvey Show	Julian	Episode: "African- American Gigolo"
2002	For Your Love	Derrick	Episode: "The Affairs of the Heart"
2004	The Parkers	Johnnie	3 episodes
2004	The Division	Johnny	5 episodes
2005	Half & Half	Roland	Episode: "The Big Home is Where the Car Is Episode"
2005	Love, Inc.	Daniel	Episode: "Living Single"
2011	Reed Between the Lines	James	Episode: "Let's Talk About Boys in Tights"
