= Kelsey Scott =

American film and television actress

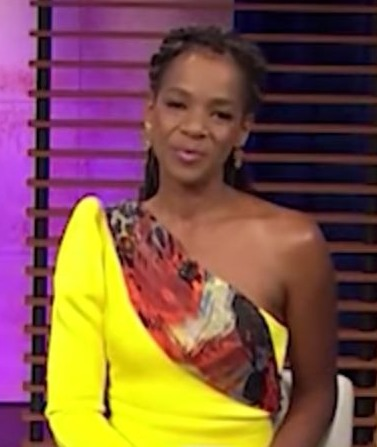
- Scott in 2020
- Born: Atlanta, Georgia, U.S.
- Occupation: Actress
- Years active: 1995–present

Kelsey Scott is an American actress, screenwriter and director.

== Biography ==
Kelsey Scott was born and raised in Atlanta, Georgia. When she was 13, Scott starred as Robert Guillaume's daughter in the short-lived ABC sitcom The Robert Guillaume Show (1989). She graduated from Florida A&M University.

After Scott began working as a director and screenwriter, her most notable work was the short film The Buse (2000) for which she won awards at the Sidewalk Film Festival, Palm Beach International Film Festival, Florida Film Festival and Hollywood Black Film Festival. She wrote the 2004 thriller film Motives and its sequel, Motives 2 (2007).

In the late 2000s, Scott returned to acting, appearing in episodes of television series include House, Grey's Anatomy, Criminal Minds and NCIS. She played Anne Northup, Solomon Northup's wife in the 2013 period-drama film 12 Years a Slave. From 2016 to 2017 she had the recurring role in the ABC legal thriller series, How to Get Away with Murder as Rose Edmond.

In 2017, Scott received Primetime Emmy Award nomination for Outstanding Actress in a Short Form Comedy or Drama Series for her performance in Fear the Walking Dead: Passage. In 2019, she received Daytime Emmy Award nomination for Outstanding Guest Performer in a Digital Daytime Drama Series for web-drama series, Giants. From 2018 to 2021 she co-starred in the HBO comedy series, Insecure and in 2021 appeared in three episodes of Dynasty. In 2022, she appeared as the store manager in Better Call Saul season six episode 10.
