= Jazsmin Lewis =

American actress

- Born: Columbus, Ohio, United States
- Occupations: Actress; film producer; musician
- Years active: 1994–present
- Known for: Traci Townsend; Jennifer Palmer – Barbershop
- Website: jazsminlewis.com

Jazsmin Lewis (born March 22) is an American actress, film producer and musician. Lewis is best known for her starring role as the title character in the 2005 film Traci Townsend and as Jennifer Palmer, Calvin's wife in the Barbershop film series.

== Biography ==
Lewis began her professional career in music during her high school years, which included singing and playing guitar for musical acts George Clinton and The Ohio Players. After her music career, Lewis relocated to Los Angeles where she received roles on television shows such as, Saved by the Bell, The Wayans Brothers, Eve and Living Single. Lewis is also known for being the Coors Light spokes-model during 2001 and 2002.

Lewis portrayed the title character in Traci Townsend in 2005. For her role, Lewis won the 2006 award for the Best Acting Performance Award at the 2006 Boston International Film Festival. In addition to the Boston award, Lewis also won the Audience Choice Award winner at the 2006 Hollywood Black Film Festival for the aforementioned role that same year.

== Filmography ==
=== Film ===
Year	Title	Role	Notes
1995	Broken Bars	Raven	
1997	Def Jam's How to Be a Player	Pookie	
2002	Barbershop	Jennifer Palmer	
2003	The Beat	Tawanna	
2003	Blacklisted	Pluke	Video
2003	Deliver Us from Eva	Lori	
2003	Baadasssss!	Working Girl	
2004	Barbershop 2: Back in Business	Jennifer Palmer	
2004	Doing Hard Time	Robin	Video
2005	Wifey	Malika Melrose	Video
2005	Flip the Script	Nikki	
2006	Traci Townsend	Traci Townsend	
2007	Three Can Play That Game	Tiffany	
2007	Divine Intervention	Divine Matthews	
2008	Grapes on a Vine	Cris Hayes	
2009	Applause for Miss E	April	TV movie
2009	I Do... I Did!	Dr. Jazmine	
2011	She's Not Our Sister	Allison	TV movie
2011	The Perfect Man	Bailey	
2011	Breathe	Angela Logan	
2012	The Marriage Chronicles	Dr. Jailen Masters	
2013	Hope for Love	Gabriella	
2013	Je'Caryous Johnson's Marriage Material	Koren	
2013	Dreams	LaShawna	
2013	My Sister's Wedding	Candice	
2014	Four Seasons	Lisa	
2016	Barbershop: The Next Cut	Jennifer Palmer	
2016	Grandma's House	Loretta	
2016	For the Love of Christmas	Sunday Hughes	
2016	LAPD African Cops	Josephine	
2017	Almost Amazing	Evelyn	
2017	The Cheaters Club	Karen	
2017	Conflict of Interest	Gabriele Winters	
2017	Our Dream Christmas	Gabby Purnell	
2018	Kinky	Colette	
2021	Welcome Matt	Angela	
2021	The Handler	Angel	
2022	One Bad Habit	Jordan	
2022	Platinum	Ernestine	
2022	Shadows	Shonda	
2023	The Bayou City Murders	Officer Tamara Haynes	
2023	Unfinished Business: Kingston High	Mrs. Hopkins	
2023	Queen Angie	Sonia	
2024	The Break of Dawn	Nikki	
2025	Aftershock: The Nicole P. Bell Story	Laura Paultre	
2026	Risk It All	Mrs. Taylor	

=== Television ===
Year	Title	Role	Notes
1994	Martin	Pina	Episode: "The Closer I Get to You"
1995	Saved by the Bell: The New Class	Carla Peterson	Episode: "R.J.'s Handicap"
1995	Hang Time	Teresa Campbell	Episode: "Poetic Justice"
1996	Family Matters	Yvette	Episode: "Scammed"
1996	In the House	Carly	Episode: "Home Again"
1996	The Wayans Bros.	Lena	Episode: "Grandma's in the Hiz-House"
1996	Sparks	Ms. Robinson	Episode: "Penal Envy"
1996	Malcolm & Eddie	Balloon Woman	Episode: "Dead Guy"
1997	Claude's Crib	Tiffany	Episode: "Pilot"
1997	In the House	Debbie	Episode: "The Retreat Story"
1997	Baywatch Nights	Kira	Episode: "A Thousand Words"
1997	Beyond Belief: Fact or Fiction	Anne Larkin	Episode: "The Subway"
1997	Living Single	Candace	Episode: "Love Don't Live Here Anymore: Part 1"
1997-98	Good News	Venita Stanbury	Main Cast
1998	Martial Law	Justine Winship	Episode: "Bad Seed"
1998	USA High	Tyrae the Blind Date	Episode: "The Blind Date"
2001	Moesha	Lanae Foster	Recurring Cast: Season 6
2002	For Your Love	Chantel	Episode: "The Affair of the Heart"
2002	Half & Half	Karen	Episode: "The Big Upsetting Set-Up Episode"
2003-04	Line of Fire	Jada	Recurring Cast
2004	Eve	Dani	Recurring Cast: Season 1, Guest: Season 2
2005	All of Us	Gwenn Finn	Episode: "Creeping with the Enemy"
2009	Brothers	Monica	Episode: "House Rules/Anniversary"
2010	Meet the Browns	Joy	Episode: "Meet the Bump and Grind"
2011	She's Not Our Sister	Allison	Main Cast
2016	Kocktails with Khloé	Herself	Episode: "The Deep Dish"
2016	In the Cut	Francine James	Episode: "Easy Come Easy Go"
2023-24	Kold x Windy	Brenda	Recurring Cast
