= Deliver Us from Eva =

2003 film directed by Gary Hardwick

- Theatrical release poster
- Directed by: Gary Hardwick
- Written by: James Iver Mattson; B. E. Brauner; Gary Hardwick
- Produced by: Paddy Cullen; Len Amato
- Starring: LL Cool J Gabrielle Union; Duane Martin; Essence Atkins; Robinne Lee; Meagan Good; Mel Jackson; Dartanyan Edmonds
- Cinematography: Alexander Gruszynski
- Edited by: Earl Watson
- Music by: Marcus Miller
- Distributed by: Focus Features
- Release date: February 7, 2003
- Running time: 105 minutes
- Country: United States
- Language: English
- Box office: $17.6 million

Deliver Us from Eva is a 2003 American romantic comedy film starring LL Cool J and Gabrielle Union, revolving around LL's character, Ray Adams, being paid to date a troublesome young lady named Eva Dandridge (Union). It is considered by many as a modern update of William Shakespeare's play The Taming of the Shrew. It was released to the American theaters on February 7, 2003 by Focus Features, and also stars Essence Atkins, Duane Martin, and Mel Jackson.

The title is a play on a line of the Lord's Prayer: "And lead us not into temptation but deliver us from evil."

== Plot ==
Evangeline (Eva) Dandridge works for the Los Angeles Health Department as an inspector, a job well-suited for her bossy and perfectionist nature. She and her sisters—Kareenah, Bethany and Jacqui—have been taking care of each other since their parents died when they were young. As a result of the combination of her personality and her family's circumstances, Eva's level of involvement in her sisters' lives causes a high level of tension between her and her sisters' significant others (Tim, Mike and Darrell, respectively).

While the men are out at a bar comiserating about how interfering Eva is, they come across Mike's old friend Ray Adams. He is a "Master Player" who can handle even the most difficult women. The guys hire Ray to seduce Eva and convince her to move away with him so they can finally be free of her meddling. Little do they know she has already been offered a new job in Chicago.

After a disastrous first date, Ray tells the guys that Eva is too difficult for even him to handle and offers to return their money. However, when he runs into her while at work delivering meat to local restaurants, they make amends and begin a relationship. Eva and Ray fall in love and she even temporarily abandons her shrewish ways. When things start to get serious, Eva's sisters all start comparing their relationships to Ray and Eva's relationship, making things even worse than before.

After they find out about Eva's job offer, the significant others panic and attempt to break up the blossoming romance, claiming their wives never let them hear the end of the latest with Eva and Ray and that Eva intends to stay in the city. The men finally hatch a daring plan: kidnap Ray, lie to Eva about his death in an accident and cajole her into leaving the city.

Eva believes them, so arranges a tearful funeral for her "dead" boyfriend. In the middle of the service Ray appears, having escaped his prison and the whole truth comes out. An angry Eva dumps him and storms out of the church. After the whole ordeal, Ray tries numerous times to apologize to her and tells her that he truly loves her, but Eva does not want to hear it and still plans to move on without him.

Days later, Eva apologizes to Mike, Tim and Darrell for meddling and being a huge pain and distraction for them and her sister's lives. She reveals that they dissolved and split their parent's inheritance and her sisters and their partners reconcile. Mike and Bethany become engaged. Eva leaves and starts her new life in Chicago.

One day, after a meeting, Ray surprises Eva on a white horse in front of her boss Oscar Tillman and colleagues. He reveals that he left everything behind in Los Angeles to come and be with her in Chicago. Ray tells Eva that he cannot live without her and will do whatever it takes to win her back. Convinced, she takes him back and they share a kiss before leaving on the white horse, ready to start their new lives together.

== Cast ==
- LL Cool J as Raymond "Ray" Adams (cast by real name James Todd Smith, used for the first time.)
- Gabrielle Union as Evangeline "Eva" Dandridge
- Duane Martin as Michael "Mike"
- Essence Atkins as Kareenah Dandridge
- Robinne Lee as Bethany Dandridge
- Meagan Good as Jacqui Dandridge
- Mel Jackson as Timothy "Tim"
- Dartanyan Edmonds as Darrell
- Kym Whitley as Ormandy
- Nikki Washington as Robin
- Royale Watkins as Telly
- Matt Winston as Oscar Tillman
- Ruben Paul as Rashaun
- Dorian Gregory as Lucius Johnson
- Kenya Moore as Renee Johnson
- Henry Kingi Jr. as Mounted Cop
- Steve Stapenhorst as The Mayor
- Stephen Saux as The Bartender
- Terry Crews as Big Bartender
- Aloma Wright as Reverend Washington
- Jazsmin Lewis as Lori
- Terry Dexter as Valerie

== Reception ==
Deliver Us from Eva received mixed reviews from critics. It holds a 43% rating on Rotten Tomatoes based on 83 reviews, with the critics consensus stating, "Though Union and LL Cool J are appealing romantic leads, Deliver Us from Eva is too predictable and contrived." Metacritic, which uses a weighted average, assigned the film a score of 46 out of 100, based on 25 critics, indicating "mixed or average" reviews.

=== Box office ===
The film opened at No. 6 in the U.S. Box office in the weekend of February 7, 2003, raking in $6,648,374 USD in its first opening weekend.

== See also ==
- The Taming of the Shrew
- List of William Shakespeare screen adaptations
