= The Darker Image =

The Darker Image was the first all-black female swimsuit calendar to break into mainstream bookstores across the United States, such as Barnes & Noble and Waldenbooks, in 1994–1997.

Before King, Smooth and BlackMen magazines existed, black calendars such as The Darker Image were among the first to usher hip hop models into the mainstream print media (other than perhaps Jet magazine). The Darker Image was particularly well distributed and sat on shelves in Borders and Barnes & Noble nationwide and was featured on Entertainment Tonight, Extra, and The Jenny Jones Show. The Los Angeles Times quoted Barnes & Noble calendar buyer Bill Costello as saying, "The market is crying out for it. It's rare that you can say in the business, 'This is needed, there's nothing else like it.' In this case, it was true." The Darker Image's distribution records for a minority-themed swimsuit calendar remain unbroken.

The Darker Image calendar became a small part of the cultural zeitgeist of the time, particularly in the urban world, with the calendar prominently featured in John Singleton's movie Higher Learning, and The Hollywood Reporter writing: "'Phat Beach,' the first Hollywood beach blanket-type movie featuring blacks, has just wrapped principal photography.... Coolio and Paperboy will provide the rap tunes for the models from Darker Image '95 Swimsuit Calendar."

The Darker Image calendar did not feature any big name models or actresses at the time, although many of the models in the calendar went on to impressive careers, including Traci Bingham, Melissa De Sousa, Amy Hunter, Mari Morrow, and Angelle Brooks.
