= Blue Kimble =

American actor and model

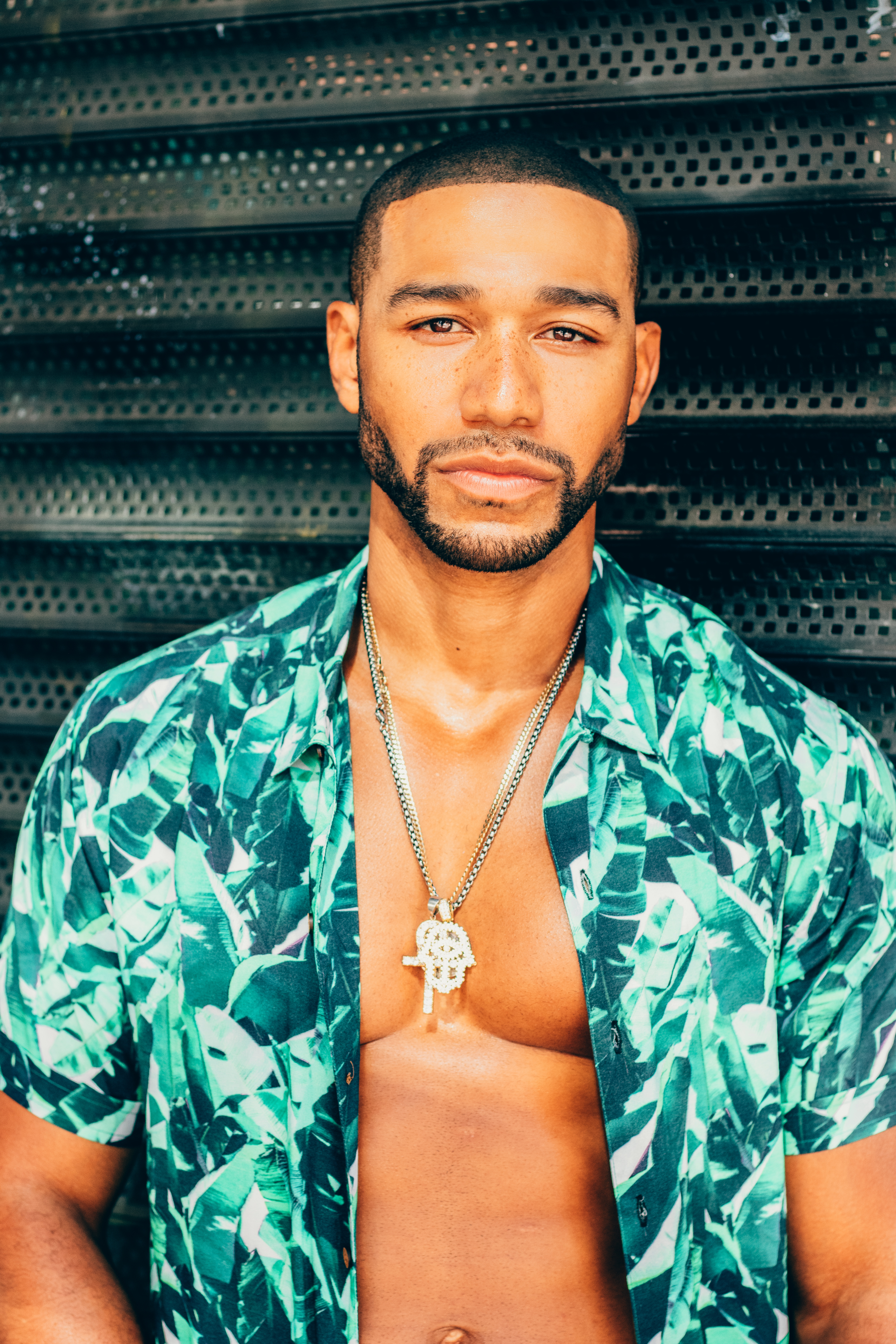
- Photo by Stephanie Saias
- Born: January 3, 1983 (age 43); Atlanta, Georgia, U.S.
- Occupation: Actor
- Years active: 2011–present

Blue Kimble (born January 3, 1983) is an American actor, model, and former football player.

== Life and career ==
Kimble was born and raised in Atlanta, Georgia. Before acting, he was a football player and played in the Arena Football League and the National Football League with the Buffalo Bills. After his football career, he began appearing on television shows, including The Game, Being Mary Jane and Devious Maids. He has appeared in more than 20 Atlanta-filmed movies, and starred in the TV One original films Media (2017) and The Bobby DeBarge Story (2019). In 2019, Kimble played a lead role opposite Chace Crawford in the American drama thriller film Nighthawks.

In 2018, Kimble began starring as Sawyer in the Urban Movie Channel drama series Monogamy. In 2020, he began starring in the BET+ soap opera, Ruthless. Kimble also had a recurring role in the Starz drama series, P-Valley from 2020 to 2022. In 2023, he was cast in the second season of BET+ drama series, The Black Hamptons.

== Filmography ==
=== Film ===
Year	Title	Role	Notes
2011	Fast Five	Extra	
2011	Old National	Detective Mark Davis	Short
2012	When Love Was Simple	Nolan	
2013	Greed: Introduction	TJ	Short
2013	Strain	Soldier	Short
2014	Loud	Raymond	
2014	Staying in Lane	Hyatt Lane	TV movie
2014	The 4th Quarter	Michael 'Easy' Eason	TV movie
2014	The Wish, a Story of Hope, Faith and Generosity	Isiah Taylor	
2014	Breathe	Xzavion Crane	
2015	What Love Will Make You Do	Todd Boston	
2015	Crimes and Mister Meanors	Agent Roberts	
2015	Returned	Benjamin Lathan	
2015	Angry Insecure Men 2	Aiden	
2015	Thirsty the Movie	Jamal	
2015	Love N Success	Guy from Cleveland	
2016	Closet Space: The Movie	J.C.	
2016	Push	Jace	
2017	Media	Anthony Jones	TV movie
2017	The Run Saga: Breathe	Xzavion Crane	
2018	Greed: Heavy Is The Hand	TJ Grant	
2018	Smoke	Joe Tucker	
2018	Atonement	Lance	TV movie
2018	The Killing Secret	Daniel	
2019	My Online Valentine	Blaze	
2019	Nighthawks	Kentavious	
2019	The Bobby DeBarge Story	Tommy DeBarge	TV movie
2019	Smile	Tone	Short
2020	Steppin' Back to Love	Eddie	TV movie
2020	Trade	Alonzo Harrison	Short
2020	My Brother's Keeper	Big Six	
2020	Live	Rav Monroe	Short
2021	The Deadliest Lie	Jaden	
2021	Christmas Déjà Vu	David	
2021	A Christmas Wish	Dalton Mckenzie	
2022	Agent Game	Drone Pilot	
2022	Bid for Love	Memphis	
2023	Best Friend	Kyle	

=== Television ===
Year	Title	Role	Notes
2012	The Game	Football Player	Recurring cast: season 5
2013	Advocate & Solicitor	A-Wall	Episode: "Pilot"
2014	Being Mary Jane	Nate	Episode: "Girls Night In"
2014	T.R.A.D.E It All	Blake Henry	Episode: "Aftermath"
2015–17	Twisted Mines	Dave	Main cast
2016	#killerpost	Ronald Taylor	Episode: "Taylor/Mitchell"
2016	Devious Maids	Justin	Episode: "The Maid Who Knew Too Much"
2017	Mann & Wife	Jacin	Episode: "Pressured by the Mann"
2018–21	Monogamy	Sawyer	Main cast
2019	A Black Lady Sketch Show	CIA Agent	Episode: "Your Boss Knows You Don't Have Eyebrows"
2019	The Rookie	Trevor Reed	Episode: "Clean Cut"
2020	The Real Bros of Simi Valley	Kane	Episode: "Exes and Axes"
2020–present	Ruthless	Andrew	Main cast
2020–22	P-Valley	Rome	Guest: season 1, recurring cast: season 2
2022	I Got a Story to Tell	Mason	Episode: "Dear Mama"
