= Ride or Die (2003 film) =

2003 film directed by Craig Ross, Jr.

- Directed by: Craig Ross Jr.
- Written by: Duane Martin; Jay Wolcott
- Produced by: Nia Hill; Aaron Beasley; Vivica A. Fox; Mitch Frankel
- Starring: Duane Martin; Vivica A. Fox; Meagan Good; Michael Taliferro; Jadakiss
- Cinematography: Carl Bartels
- Music by: Stanley A. Smith
- Distributed by: Destination Films
- Release date: 2003
- Running time: 88 minutes
- Country: United States
- Language: English

Ride or Die, also known as Hustle and Heat, is a 2003 crime drama film written by Duane Martin, who stars in the film and Jay Wolcott. The film was directed by Craig Ross, Jr. In addition to Martin, the cast includes Vivica A. Fox and Meagan Good.

== Plot ==
Conrad "Rad" McRae (Duane Martin) is a private investigator who is on the trail of the man who murdered his lifelong friend, Benjamin (Jadakiss), an up-and-coming rapper. Weapons expert Lisa (Vivica A. Fox) partners with McRae and assists him in his quest for justice. At the center of his investigation is Benjamin's former producer, "B-Free" (Michael Taliferro), who controls quite a powerful business that often deals in illegal activities.

== Cast ==
- Duane Martin as Conrad "Rad" McRae
- Vivica A. Fox as Lisa
- Meagan Good as Fake Venus
- Michael Taliferro as "B-Free"
- Jadakiss as Benjamin "Killer Ben"
- Geoffrey Blake as Gerard "Armageddon"
- Daniel Dae Kim as Miyako
- Sticky Fingaz as "Demise"
- Iona Morris as Lieutenant Lewis
- Miranda Kwok as Tommy Wong
- Stacey Dash as Real Venus
- Gabrielle Union as Masked Woman
- Faizon Love as David Rabinowitz
- Zachary Williams as Basketball Player
