= Angelle Brooks =

American actress

Angelle Brooks is an American actress.

Since the mid-1990s, Brooks has guest-starred in numerous television shows such as The Young and the Restless, Malcolm and Eddie, NYPD Blue, The Sopranos, The Larry Sanders Show, Strong Medicine, Martin, Family Matters, The Fresh Prince of Bel-Air, Arli$$, The King of Queens, The Wayans Bros., The Jamie Foxx Show, as well as providing the voice of Indira "Indy" Daimonji in the MTV series Spider-Man: The New Animated Series. She also appeared in the films The Brothers (2001), Blue Hill Avenue (2001), Book of Love (2002), and her feature-film debut Cappuccino (1998).

In 1995, Brooks was one of ten women who appeared in the first mass-market black female swimsuit calendar in the United States, The Darker Image.

== Filmography ==
=== Film ===
Year	Title	Role	Notes
1996	One Tough Bastard	India Adams	
1996	Last Exit to Earth	Woman #3	TV movie
1997	Riot	Linda	TV movie
1997	In Dark Places	Female Guest #1	
1998	Cappuccino	Vanessa Erickson	
2000	Shafted!	Dr. Foxy Brown, PhD	
2000	Ritual	Teresa Becker	
2000	Midnight Blue	Jessica Saunders	TV movie
2001	The Brothers	Judge Carla Williams	
2001	Blue Hill Avenue	Martine	
2002	Book of Love: The Definitive Reason Why Men Are Dogs	Renee / Date #8	
2003	Black Listed	Marcella	Video
2003	Matchups	Dr. Portis Stoval	Video
2005	Can I Get a Pickle?	Pamela Michaels	Short
2011	Carjacked	Judge	
2017	The Wrong Mother	Nurse Kerri	
2018	The Stand Up Hitman	Tina	Short
2019	The Accompanist	Nadine	
2020	Taking Your Daughter	Teacher	

=== Television ===
Year	Title	Role	Notes
1994	The Larry Sanders Show	Felicia	Episode: "Next Stop Bottom"
1994	NYPD Blue	Tanya	Episode: "For Whom the Skell Rolls"
1995	The Fresh Prince of Bel-Air	Angie	Episode: "Three's a Crowd"
1995	Martin	Tanya	Episode: "The Ex-files"
1995	Hang Time	Roxanne Myers	Episode: "Full Court Press"
1996	Family Matters	Monica	Episode: "Life in the Fast Lane"
1996	Hangin' with Mr. Cooper	Brenda	Episode: "The Curse"
1996	The Young and the Restless	Stephanie Simmons	Episode: "Episode #1.5957"
1996	The Wayans Bros.	Kim	Episode: "Getting It"
1996–97	Malcolm & Eddie	Holly Brooks	Recurring cast: Season 1
1997	The Parent 'Hood	Restaurant Woman	Episode: "Me and Mrs. Robinson"
1998	The Wayans Bros.	Angel	Episode: "Ho's on First"
1998	Arli$$	Camille Balboa	Episode: "Fans First"
1998–2002	V.I.P.	Maxine de la Cruz	Recurring cast: Season 1–2, main cast: Season 3–4
1999	The Jamie Foxx Show	Joy	Episode: "Forever Your Girl"
2000	Veronica's Closet	Journalist	Episode: "Veronica's Perfect Man"
2000	Pensacola: Wings of Gold	-	Episode: "Brothers"
2000	Arli$$	Megan	Episode: "Making Things Happen"
2001	The Parkers	Toni Ross	Recurring cast: Season 2–3
2002	The King of Queens	Leslie	Episode: "Missing Links"
2003	Spider-Man: The New Animated Series	Indira 'Indy' Daimonji (voice)	Recurring cast
2004	Strong Medicine	Audrey	Episode: "Selective Breeding"
2006	The Sopranos	Liaison Woman	Episode: "Luxury Lounge"
