= Welcome Matt =

- Film poster
- Directed by: Leon Pierce Jr.
- Written by: Leon Pierce Jr.
- Starring: Tahj Mowry; GG Townson; Deon Cole; Jazsmin Lewis
- Distributed by: Gravitas Ventures
- Release date: May 28, 2021
- Running time: 92 minutes
- Country: United States
- Language: English

Welcome Matt is a 2021 American comedy-drama film written and directed by Leon Pierce Jr. and starring Tahj Mowry, GG Townson, Deon Cole and Jazsmin Lewis.

== Premise ==
Matt is an aspiring writer/director in his 20s who has agoraphobia following a traumatizing experience. Not wanting to leave his apartment, Matt decides to make his movie there. Following the breakup with his girlfriend as well as an eviction notice, Matt decides to see an at-home therapist to overcome his agoraphobia.

== Cast ==
- Tahj Mowry as Matt
- Aaron Grady as Cedric
- Deon Cole as Norman
- Jazsmin Lewis as Angela
- Dorien Wilson as Harold
- GG Townson as Lisa

== Release ==
Gravitas Ventures acquired North American distribution rights to the film in March 2021. The film was released in theaters and on demand on May 28, 2021.
