= Leila Danette =

American actress

- Born: August 23, 1909; Jacksonville, Florida, U.S.
- Died: September 4, 2012 (aged 103)
- Occupation: Actor
- Years active: 1976–2003

Leila Danette (August 23, 1909 – September 4, 2012) was an American stage, film and television actress, noted for her stage work and for her role as Helen on the short-lived television sitcom, You Take the Kids.

== Early life and career ==
Born in Jacksonville, Florida, Danette attended both Morgan State University and Howard University. Before becoming an actress, she worked as an elementary school teacher in Baltimore and taught speech to students in Washington, D.C.

Danette began acting professionally on the stage at age 67. One of her first substantial roles was opposite James Earl Jones in The Great White Hope. In 1982, she was noted for her performance in The Brothers. In The New York Times Theatre Reviews 1999-2000, D. J. R. Brickner wrote of her performance in Uncle Jack, noting that she was a "Broadway veteran" who imbued her role of Mary with a "touching authenticity".

In addition to stage roles, Danette appeared in several films including The First Deadly Sin (1980) and Garbo Talks (1984). She has also had guest roles on A Different World, The Cosby Show, Law & Order, and Third Watch.

== Filmography ==
Film
Year	Film	Role	Notes
1980	The First Deadly Sin	Woman on Step #1	
1982	Benny's Place	Role Unknown	
1984	Death Mask	Della	
1984	Garbo Talks	Augusta	
1986	Power	Poor Woman	
1987	The Rosary Murders	Mrs. Washington	
1988	Running on Empty	Maid	
1997	White Lies	Woman #2 in Window	
2003	Pieces of April	Woman in Stairwell	
Television
Year	Title	Role	Notes
1988	A Different World	Mrs. Pruitt	Episode: "A Stepping Stone"
1990–1991	You Take the Kids	Helen	6 episodes
1992	The Cosby Show	Mrs. Whittaker	Episode: "The Price is Wrong"
1995	New York Undercover	Mae Helen	Episode: "Private Enemy No. 1"
1994–2001	Law & Order	Various roles	4 episodes
2003	Third Watch	Lucinda	Episode: "A Ticket Grows in Brooklyn"
