= William L. Johnson =

American actor and musician

William L. Johnson is an American actor and musician who has held starring and prominent roles in many theatrically released projects, including Blue Hill Avenue, Motives 1, Motives 2, Mannsfield 12, Crossover, Doing Hard Time and Tears of a Clown.

Johnson has also acted in several independent short films and features. He also performed in Showtime's A Spider's Web with Stephen Baldwin and Carrie Weir.

As a musician, Johnson has released an album under the persona of "Brotha Bill" called "BrothaBill- Underground Funky Street Soul Brotha". The music falls under the Neo soul, R&B and funk categories.

Soon after graduation from Emerson Visual and Performing Arts High School, he formed a group "Black to Black", supported by manager Jimmy Newton. In 1999, Johnson and producer/engineer Booker T. Jones conceived "BaldHeadDread", which garnered significant exposure when they scored the movie soundtrack for Ragdoll.

== Filmography ==
=== Film ===
Year	Title	Role	Notes
1999	Ragdoll	Jean	
2000	The Playaz Court	Lorenzo	
2000	Killjoy	Lorenzo	
2001	Two Degrees	Terry	
2001	Room for Seven	Gabe Ashe	
2001	Nakita Blues	J-Smooth	
2001	Blue Hill Avenue	E. Bone	
2001	Sacred is the Flesh	Unknown	
2002	Spider's Web	Conman Jerry	
2003	Cradle 2 the Grave	Uncredited	
2003	Sweet Oranges	Jamal Jenkins	
2004	Motives	Ray	
2004	Doing Hard Time	Clever	
2005	View in Black & White	James	
2005	Tears of a Clown	Kenny Lang	
2006	Restraining Order	Thug	
2006	Crossover	Aub	
2007	Motives 2	Ray	
2007	Traci Townsend	Singer	
2007	The Mannsfield 12	Gutta	
2008	Marco Polo	Jared	
2010	Trapped: Haitian Nights	Blazi	
2010	The Confidant	Detective Moore	
2010	Ex$pendable	Arnold	
2013	Dolls of Voodoo	Blazi	
2015	The Man in 3B	Gangsta #1	
2020	Bernie Problems	Bernie	

=== Television ===
Year	Title	Role	Notes
2001	The Steve Harvey Show	The Emcee	Episode: "Not the Best Man"
2007	All of Us	Brian	
2022–2024	The Black Hamptons	Michael Donovan	11 episodes
