= Saturdays (TV series) =

American television series

- Genre: Coming-of-age; Comedy
- Created by: Norman Vance Jr.
- Starring: Danielle Jalade; Daria Johns; Peyton Z. Basnight; Jermaine Harris; Tim Johnson Jr.; Golden Brooks; Omar Gooding
- Opening theme: "Ain't No Other Day" by Rae Khalil
- Country of origin: United States
- Original language: English
- No. of seasons: 1
- No. of episodes: 15

Production
- Executive producers: Norman Vance Jr.; Marsai Martin; Josh Martin; Carol Martin; Nicole Dow
- Production locations: Chicago, Illinois
- Camera setup: Single-camera
- Running time: 22–24 minutes
- Production companies: Over the Hump Production Inc.; Genius Entertainment; Gwave Productions

Original release
- Network: Disney Channel
- Release: March 24 – May 12, 2023

Saturdays is an American coming-of-age comedy television series created by Norman Vance Jr. It aired from March 24 to May 12, 2023, on Disney Channel. The series stars Danielle Jalade, Daria Johns, Peyton Z. Basnight, Jermaine Harris, Tim Johnson Jr., Golden Brooks, and Omar Gooding.

== Premise ==
Paris Johnson, a 14-year-old girl from Chicago, forms the "We-B-Girlz" skate crew with her best friends Simone and Ari. Together, they are determined to create the hottest skate routines in their local roller rink "Saturdays Rockin' Roller Palace" and are working to become goldens in the Battle 2-B Golden Skate Competition.

== Cast ==
=== Main ===
- Danielle Jalade as Paris Johnson, the leader of the We-B-Girlz skate crew, who has a tendency of doing too much with her big ideas
- Daria Johns as Simone Samson, Paris' best friend, who is into the boho-chic style
- Peyton Z. Basnight as Ari Stevens, Paris' best friend, who is into the butterfly aesthetic
- Jermaine Harris as London Johnson, Paris' older brother, who is a DJ at Saturdays
- Tim Johnson Jr. as Derek "D-Rok" Troy, London's best friend and fellow DJ at Saturdays, who is also an aspiring singer
- Golden Brooks as Deb Johnson, Paris and London's mother, who runs a baking business called "Cal & Deb B-Bakin'" with her husband. The episode "Feelin' Brand New New" reveals that her full first name is Debra.
- Omar Gooding as Cal Johnson, Paris and London's father, who runs the baking business with his wife. The episode "Feelin' Brand New New" reveals that his full first name is Calvin.

=== Recurring ===
- Yolanda "Yo-Yo" Whitaker as Duchess, the rink owner. The episode "Don't Clown the Duchess" reveals that her real name is Delilah Denise Williams.
- Missy Fierro as Madison Ortiz, a DJ at Saturdays and London's girlfriend
- Noah Cottrell as Ivan, a VIP skater at Saturdays and Simone's love interest
- Mirabelle Lee as Sonia, the leader of the rival skate crew "2-Cute-4-U"

=== Notable guest stars ===
- Da Brat as Princess, Duchess' former singing partner, who started dressing up as a clown after their singing duo broke up
- Issac Ryan Brown as Booker, Paris and London's play cousin, who is visiting Chicago for the summer

== Production ==
On March 11, 2021, Disney Channel gave a pilot order to Saturdays. Marsai Martin and Norman Vance Jr. serve as executive producers. Vance also served as the writer of the pilot. Charles Stone III directed the pilot. On November 30, 2021, the series was formally greenlit. All main cast members returned from the pilot, except Samantha A. Smith as Roxy. Production began on May 2, 2022 in Chicago, Illinois and wrapped in mid-September that same year. The series was filmed at Markham Roller Rink, which was rented for filming since it had been closed for years. On April 7, 2022, Tim Johnson Jr. and Peyton Z. Basnight joined the cast as series regulars. On February 9, 2023, it was announced that the series would premiere on March 24, 2023. On April 26, 2023, it was announced that Saturdays and Raven's Home would have a special crossover episode, which premiered on April 28, 2023. On November 7, 2023, it was reported that the series was cancelled after one season.

== Episodes ==
No.	Title	Directed by	Written by	Original release date	Prod. code	U.S. viewers (millions)
1	"Skates, Lies & Videos"	Nancy Hower	Stacey Evans Morgan	March 24, 2023	103	0.12
Paris, Simone, and Ari are three best friends from Chicago, Illinois who form the roller skating crew, "We-B-Girlz" at their local roller rink called "Saturdays Rockin' Roller Palace". One day, the girls find out a music video for a popular rapper named "Box Heezy" is being shot at the rink and they want to be in it. However, only skaters aged 18 or older can be in the video. This gives Paris and the girls the idea to age up their looks to pass as 18-year-olds and therefore, be a part of the music video. The girls walk into Saturdays with overdone hair and makeup and they were let into the auditions. Eventually, the producer catches them and is actually impressed by their tenacity. This leads to him allowing only one of the girls to be in the video. The girls agree that if only one of them can be in the video, then none of them should be. The next Saturday, Ari is caught signing up for the video by Paris, who is caught by Simone. The three briefly argue and then agree to never go behind each other's backs again. On a last minute decision, the producer decides he needs all three girls to be in the video. However, it's not what they expected at all, as their role in the music video was to be dancing toilet paper rolls. Paris' parents laugh at the video, telling her that next time she should ask what the video is about before being a part of it. Guest stars: Yolanda "Yo-Yo" Whitaker as Duchess, Noah Cottrell as Ivan, Chaz Lamar Shepherd as Doug Jones
2	"Comb Back to Me"	Nancy Hower	Norman Vance Jr.	March 24, 2023	102	0.08
Paris is tired of London embarrassing her at Saturdays. As an act of revenge, she steals his favorite hair comb, which he named "Lucille." This saddens London and she stops showing up at Saturdays. He begins staying in the garage, where he doesn't shower or pick up after himself for weeks. Meanwhile, Cal and Deb are trying to lose weight they gained during a pandemic. After Duchess tells Paris that London is missing out on a $500 DJing gig, she begins to feel guilty and wants to return the comb. The only problem is that fell out of her backpack due to a big hole being in it. Paris goes home and admits to London that she lost the comb and apologizes. She also tells him that she is tired of him embarrassing her at Saturdays, in which London apologizes for. Cal comes into the garage with the comb, to London's delight. After he leaves the room, Cal admits that it wasn't the "Lucille" comb. It turns out that London loses the same comb at least five times a year, so Cal bought a bulk of the same comb and stores a box of them in the attic. Guest stars: Yolanda "Yo-Yo" Whitaker as Duchess, Missy Fierro as Madison Ortiz
3	"Too Many Cooks"	Bridget Stokes	Kourtney Richard	March 31, 2023 (Note: This episode was first released on Disney+ on March 25, 2023.)	104	0.08
The We-B-Girlz want new outfits to wear at the rink. They find one they all like, but it is too expensive for them. Paris convinces her parents to let them work for their baking business and they reluctantly agree. On the first day of work, the girls make a big mess in the kitchen in which Paris cleans up and promises to never let it happen again. However, Paris is told by her parents that she needs to fire Simone and Ari. Not wanting to hurt their feelings, Paris reluctantly lets the girls make deliveries for gender reveal cupcakes. All is going well until Simone and Ari deliver an order to the wrong address, leading to Paris getting grounded. Meanwhile, Derek is trying to impress a girl at Saturdays by learning how to roller skate, with some help from London. Guest star: Yolanda "Yo-Yo" Whitaker as Duchess
4	"Why Are You So Meme?"	Bridget Stokes	Tamiko K. Brooks	March 31, 2023	105	N/A
Paris shows up to Saturdays in a new hairstyle, not knowing that her rival Sonia Little also has the same hairstyle. This results in an awkward stare down between the We-B-Girlz and 2-Cute-4-U. Cal is having a hard time turning on a Smart TV and London has to help him with it. The next morning, Cal disconnects the internet and declares that the family goes analog. Simone and Ari tell Paris that they are proud of an insulting meme she made about Sonia. However, Paris didn't actually make the meme. With Sonia thinking Paris made the meme about her, she and her crew retaliate by making memes about We-B-Girlz. This results in a meme war between We-B-Girlz and 2-Cute-4-U. Shortly after, Paris gets called into Duchess' office and Sonia is also there. Duchess has been observing the meme war and admits that while it's creative, it becomes a problem when Duchess becomes a meme. Paris claims that Duchess would shrink her head if this meme war didn't stop. She is willing to call a truce with Sonia and end the meme war. Paris and the girls then suspect that Ivan was the one who created the memes. Back at home, London and Derek are on their way to the store until Cal tells them they need to learn how to change a flat tire. He struggles with it and Deb comes out to help him. Later on, Cal gives in and reconnects the internet. The next Saturday, Ivan sneaks into Saturdays and the lights turn off. A set of skaters dressed in skull costumes surround him and perform a scary dance. It turns out that it was We-B-Girlz and 2-Cute-4-U behind the dance. This scared Ivan enough to agree to never mess with both of the crews again. Guest stars: Yolanda "Yo-Yo" Whitaker as Duchess, Noah Cottrell as Ivan, Mirabelle Lee as Sonia
5	"Roll a Mile in My Skates"	Shea William Vanderpoort	David Tolentino	April 7, 2023	106	0.11
It's Golden Mentor Day at Saturdays. However, Paris, Simone, and Ari are in Saturday school detention for texting in class. The school principal, Ms. Goldstone (also known as "Coldstone" and "Hot Wheels"), is known for giving students Saturday school for the smallest reasons. Eventually, the girls make it to Saturdays for Golden Mentor Day and they are excited for their mentor, until they realize they got Principal Goldstone as their mentor. Meanwhile, Cal purchases an old taco truck for him and Deb's baking business. Deb disapproves of it because Cal did not discuss it with her before purchasing it. Determined to get rid of Goldstone as their mentor, Ari gets insight from around the rink and tells Paris and Simone that Swan, another mentor, humiliated Goldstone back in the 1992 Golden Age Skills relay. Goldstone was on the winning end, until Swan snatched off her wig. The girls get an idea to humiliate Goldstone back into retirement again, which Goldstone overhears and resigns as their mentor. Back at home, Cal eventually gets rid of the truck due to Deb's disapproval. However, she brings it back remodeled and they end up keeping it. While practicing, the girls feel guilty about trying to oust Principal Goldstone as their mentor. They go back to the school to apologize to her. She agrees to be their mentor again and the We-B-Girlz compete, ultimately winning. It ends with the We-B-Girlz back in Saturday school and Goldstone taking a selfie with the trophy that they won. Guest stars: Yolanda "Yo-Yo" Whitaker as Duchess, Missy Fierro as Madison Ortiz, Noah Cottrell as Ivan, Taneka Johnson as Coldstone, Sire James as Swan
6	"Don't Clown the Duchess"	Shea William Vanderpoort	Christian Nicole Davis	April 7, 2023	107	0.07
It's the 25th anniversary of Duchess' song, "Chi Girlz" and she gets upset when London almost plays it at the rink. Mr. Perry tells the girls that "Chi Girlz" rubs Duchess the wrong way and suggests they never play it again. Paris gets the idea to throw Duchess a party to celebrate the anniversary of the song, in which Mr. Perry thinks is a bad idea. Paris throws the party and Duchess reunites with Princess, her old singing partner who is now a clown. Princess confronts Duchess for not showing up for their performance at the Windy City Rap Fest. Princess suggests for them to battle it out, in which Duchess refuses. Meanwhile, Cal and Deb meet their new neighbors, Kev and Bev Jackson. Deb seems to get along with Bev just fine, but Cal is constantly bickering with Kev, trying to one-up him. Later, Deb reveals to Paris that she used to be Duchess and Princess' former backup dancer. She tells her that when "Chi Girlz" dropped, it was a huge success and that Duchess and Princess became big stars. They were invited to perform at the Windy City Rap Fest in front of thousands of people, but Duchess did not show up. After that, Duchess never rapped again and took over Saturdays, whereas Princess became a clown. After a series of injuries, Cal and Kev agree to make up, as their wives threatened to expel them from their houses if they continue to bicker. Duchess and Princess finally have a rap battle, in which Duchess tells her that she loves her and that she means much to her. Duchess apologizes to Princess for driving her into a life of clowning and Princess says she has nothing to apologize for because she loves being a clown. "Chi Girlz" is finally being played at the rink again and Deb reunites with Duchess and Princess and dances with them. Guest stars: Yolanda "Yo-Yo" Whitaker as Duchess, Da Brat as Princess, Eric Nenninger as Kev Jackson
7	"The Chocolate Club"	Leslie Kolins Small	Gretchen J. Berg & Aaron Harberts	April 14, 2023	108	0.12
Paris and Simone are both on their periods. When their periods are synced up, they call it the "Chocolate Club" because they crave chocolate whenever it starts. Ari comes to Paris' house, confused as to why they weren't going to Saturdays. Paris and Simone explain what the "Chocolate Club" is to Ari and she acts like she is a part of it too, to avoid feeling left out. Meanwhile, at Saturdays, there is a new heartthrob named Theo, whom Madison has a crush on. This makes London envious. Paris and Simone continue to eat chocolate, while Ari tries to make plans with them. When they keep shutting down her plans because it's still "Chocolate Club" time, Ari gets fed up with it and plays an arcade game to destress. She ends up breaking the joystick on the game and Duchess takes Ari to her office, knowing something is wrong with her. Ari explains how she feels like the odd girl out and always feeling like a step behind her friends. She feels like the last to experience the "womanly things." Duchess reassures her that her time will eventually come, which makes her feel better. Madison comes back to her DJ booth, noticing that London had cleaned it up for her and made her a shelf for her belongings. London wishes Madison luck on her date with Theo. Later, Ari goes on a rollercoaster alone, until Paris and Simone stop the attendant to let them on the ride. Ari apologizes for lying about being in the Chocolate Club and the girls reassure her that they still love her even if they aren't experiencing the same things at the same time. They enjoy the rollercoaster ride together and eventually, Ari officially joins the Chocolate Club. Guest stars: Yolanda "Yo-Yo" Whitaker as Duchess, Missy Fierro as Madison Ortiz
8	"Nightmare on Paris Street"	Leslie Kolins Small	Judy Dent	April 14, 2023	109	0.10
Saturdays is closed for two weeks, due to repairs. Paris suggests to throw a block party and invite all the people from the rink. She needs signatures from everyone in town and she gets them except for Old Lady Whitaker's. They stop by her scary looking house and she reveals that she was the lady who won two gazillion dollars from a Lottery ticket. She agrees to give the girls her signature for the block party, as long as they battle for it in a skate battle in her underground skating rink. She reveals that she is well-known skater, Chi-Town Shelly. Back at home, Cal is struggling with the grill and refuses to get Deb's help until he severely burns a piece of meat. The girls end up winning the battle and Old Lady Whitaker ends up signing the clipboard. Miss Whitaker must bring her back a plate and they can't mention the skate battle or that she lives in that house. The block party is in full swing and Cal gives Deb a special apron and admits that she is the real grill master of the Johnson family. Miss Whitaker sees Derek eating a brisket and asks how much she could offer for it. Derek says it's not for sale and she whips out a big stack of cash and he gives it to her. Guest star: Angel Laketa Moore as Old Lady Whitaker
9	"Friends for a Minute"	Robbie Countryman	Abai Wobenh	April 21, 2023	110	N/A
The We-B-Girlz see Ivan as the "annoying little cousin" of Saturdays, as he constantly takes their stuff without asking. There is a new kid in town named Jesse, also known as Jesse Jess Cool J. He has his own skate crew called "Jesse's Angels." He points out that Ivan has been staring at him all day with a dirty look. Simone tells Jesse what Ivan is all about and he sees him as a brat. London and Madison bicker over the music choices, until her new boyfriend, Miles shows up and takes her out on a date. London is relieved to have Madison out of the rink for a little bit, due to their previous argument about the music. The girls confront Ivan for stealing Ari's hot dogs and asks him to pay her back. Ivan refuses and Jesse stands up to him. He tells Ivan that they should battle it out on the rink, but Ivan is stuck to the chair. When he finally gets up, his pants rip, revealing his panda underwear. Humiliated, Ivan runs out of the rink, calling for his mother. Meanwhile, London suspects that Miles is cheating on Madison. He catches him kissing another girl named Parker and wants to tell Madison, but Miles stops him before he has the chance. Back at Saturdays, Jesse has taken over the VIP section and has made some negative changes to the rink. He is raising the prices on everything and even requiring you to pay to take selfies if he isn't in them. Paris, Simone, and Ari confront him for this and they get thrown out of the rink by Jesse's Angels. They find out that Ivan's friend, Iris was also thrown out of the rink too and they agree that they need to get Ivan back at Saturdays. They find him at a park doing yoga and tell him all the horrible things Jesse has been doing. Paris tells Ivan that they still consider him family, but Ivan disagrees as he thinks that family doesn't laugh family out of the building for their choice of underwear. He tells them to deal with Jesse, since they thought he was so cool in the first place. The next Saturday, Ivan returns to the rink and tells them he just needed to recharge his battery. He reveals that he has a plan to get rid of Jesse. Madison comes back to the DJ booth and London admits she was right about the song choices and that the rink still had the same vibe. Madison tells London that she knew he was going to tell her that he saw Miles cheating on her with Parker and thanks him for always looking out for her. The two romantically stare at each other, until Derek interrupts them. The We-B-Girlz and Ivan start a skate battle with Jesse, by provoking him with his one weakness: people copying him. Jesse trips and falls on the floor and admits that they got him, but that it isn't over. Ari throws him out of the rink and the girls are happy that Ivan is back. That is, until he reveals that he is moving to Canada. Simone is saddened by this, but he kisses her on the cheek and gives her his jacket. Guest stars: Yolanda "Yo-Yo" Whitaker as Duchess, Missy Fierro as Madison Ortiz, Noah Cottrell as Ivan, Ashton Elijah as Jesse, Matte Martinez as Miles
10	"Feelin' Brand New New"	Robbie Countryman	Ra'Kenna Luckey & Courtney A. Smith	April 21, 2023	111	0.06
Simone is known for being the most zen person in the We-B-Girlz skate crew. However, she cannot stay zen after seeing a display for a new skating brand called "Pretty Little Sk8." After the girls finish skating, Simone sprays a fragrance in the air to eliminate the scent of the odor from their skates. Kimée Devereaux, the CEO and founder of Pretty Little Sk8, is drawn to the scent and comes over to Simone. She likes the earthy and bougie vibes that Simone presents. Saturdays is Kimée's newest vendor and is carrying her line and she is looking for a Chicago brand ambassador. She asks Simone if she is interested in being a brand ambassador and she instantly accepts the offer. Meanwhile, Cal and Deb are more stressed than ever because it is wedding season and they have so many cake orders to produce. They are constantly arguing and London takes advantage of this by asking to order food, since they are too distracted to care. Simone shows up to Saturdays in a limo with a purple wig on. She now goes by Simoné (pronounced See-mo-nay), as she is under a contract. The girls practice their routine for the big competition, but Simone is struggling because her Pretty Little Sk8 skates have buckles on them that give her a hard time moving in them. Paris and Ari suggest that she wears her regular skates, but Simone refuses because of her contract. Simone gets a call and says she will be right back, but she doesn't come back. She was asked by Kimée to host a pop-up shop. Paris and Ari are annoyed that Simone didn't bother to let them know, but this quickly changes after she gives them swag bags. Cal and Deb are still bickering over a wedding cake. It gets to a point where the cake ends up tipping over and falling all over the ground. Both of them refuse to clean up the mess. Later, at a Pretty Little Sk8 photoshoot, Simone is taking pictures with the other brand ambassadors, who Kimée says is the better version of her friends, rather than Paris and Ari. Simone goes over to Paris and Ari and tells them she wants to compete to be Goldens in the skate competition next year because she wants to focus on being a brand ambassador. The girls begrudgingly agree to it. Shortly after, Simone is in the limo on the way to a party with a bunch of celebrities. Kimée tells Simone that her life is about to be "golden" and she begins to feel sad because it likely reminded her of the Golden Skate Competition. Back at Saturdays, Derek is trying out to be Simone's replacement and is failing miserably. Paris says that We-B-Girlz is "We-B-Over" and Simone comes in to tell her she's wrong. Simone realizes she got caught up in all the fame and decided to leave Pretty Little Sk8. She wants her and the girls to be goldens this year, just like they had planned. The We-B-Girlz are back together and have a big group hug. Cal gets London to lure Deb to come to Saturdays and he gives her a rose. He reminds Deb that he loves her and they share a couples skate on the rink, with their names surrounded by hearts projected to the ground. Guest star: Dinora Walcott as Kimme
11	"Mama Drama"	Jono Oliver	Maya Ayele & Julian Butler	April 28, 2023 (Note: This episode was first released on Disney+ on April 26, 2023.)	112	0.08
School is out and the We-B-Girlz are ready for a fun summer before they begin high school. One of Deb's baking clients, Erica tells her that her daughter stopped talking to her as she got older. Deb worries that she and Paris would drift apart as she grows up. As a result, Deb inserts herself into every activity that Paris, Simone, and Ari are doing. Paris becomes fed up with it, but the last straw is at the Summer Spotlight Skate at Saturdays when Deb shows up and takes all the attention away from her. Paris becomes upset that Deb is all up in her business and making everything about her. Meanwhile, London and Derek strive to get more people to hear their music. London never takes requests, but obliges one for Layla when finding out her father is DJ Magic Maxx, who runs a radio show with a "Do It or Boo It" segment. Derek is noticeably a bad rapper, but London doesn't have the heart to tell him that. When they get on the radio show, they are "booed" for their music. DJ Magic Maxx asks London and Derek to sing "Happy Birthday" to Layla and is impressed with Derek's singing. He encourages Derek to continue singing and quit rapping, which he does. Paris finds Deb doing her nails alone in the kitchen and apologizes for snapping at her at Saturdays. Deb apologizes to Paris for being all up in her business and blames Erica for getting in her head. The two have a redux at the Summer Spotlight Skate at Saturdays. Guest stars: Missy Fierro as Madison Ortiz, Rachel Cerda as Erica, Cece Abbey as Layla, Tone Kapone as DJ Magic Maxx
12	"Emma Dilemma"	Jono Oliver	David Tolentino & Tamiko K. Brooks	April 28, 2023	113	0.10
Booker is a family friend of the Johnson family, most notably "play cousins" with Paris and London. He is spending some of his summer in Chicago and forms a music group with London and Derek called "LDB." Booker and Derek are vocalists, while London cues the music. Booker and Derek have some dispute about who gets to sing lead. Meanwhile, 10-year-old Emma asks the We-B-Girlz for help with her crush. Each girl gives their own, different advice to Emma, which turns into a huge mess. Special guest star: Issac Ryan Brown as Booker Guest star: Ellie Reine as Emma
13	"The Return of Roxie"	Leslie Kolins Small	Gretchen J. Berg & Aaron Harberts	May 5, 2023	114	0.12
Former We-B-Girlz member, Roxie returns from Jamaica. Duchess agrees to squeeze her back into the We-B-Girlz, making the trio a foursome for the Golden Skate Competition. There is some noticeable tension between Ari and Roxie. Ari is noticeably annoyed when Roxie gives Paris and Simone some bracelets that she had made in Jamaica for them. Roxie gives her a refrigerator magnet from the airport instead and they awkwardly laugh about it. The girls practice their routine, but Ari and Roxie argue over using the old or new way. Paris and Simone tell them they need to work together as a team and they eventually get along better after practicing a new routine. The tension returns when Duchess tells the girls that she can't let them compete as a foursome in the competition, due to not enough people signing up in their age group. Paris and Simone are left to make the difficult decision of choosing Ari or Roxie to compete with them. Ari calls Paris and Simone and tells them she is dropping out of the competition because she doesn't want things to be awkward with Roxie. Meanwhile, London has developed feelings for Madison and wants to tell her, but he can't find the right time. Guest stars: Yolanda "Yo-Yo" Whitaker as Duchess, Missy Fierro as Madison Ortiz, Mirabelle Lee as Sonia, Samantha Smith as Roxie
14	"Rollin' with Paris"	Leslie Kolins Small	Norman Vance Jr.	May 5, 2023	TBA	N/A
Paris and Simone are still feeling guilty about Ari leaving the group. They reflect on their journey of when Ari first joined the We-B-Girlz skate crew. It all started after Roxie moved to Jamaica. The girls felt like they would have to drop out of the competition since they could not compete as a duo. Simone suggests that Ari should join their crew, in which Paris is hesitant due to them feuding since second grade. Simone goes over to Ari and asks if she wants to be a part of the crew and Paris says she only wants her in it if Ari wants to be. The three girls participate in a freestyle skate battle against Ivan and his crew. Nobody necessarily won because Derek accidentally spilled water on the DJ equipment and the power went out. The girls celebrate with nachos and drinks after the battle and Simone thanks Ari for joining them and that she "got them out of that pickle." This triggers Ari and she leaves the group. Paris returns home and tells her parents the story of her feud with Ari. It was the fall of 2015 in second grade and Ari brought a big pickle for lunch. Paris bit Ari's pickle when she wasn't looking and ever since then, they haven't been friends. Paris apologizes to Ari for biting into her big pickle and gives her a bunch of pickle flavored snacks. She forgives her and agrees to rejoin the group. After Paris and Simone are done reflecting, they are still stuck on choosing between Ari and Roxie. They make the difficult decision and tell Roxie that they want Ari to compete with them instead. Paris and Simone go to Ari's house to tell her that she's back in the group and she happily rejoins. Roxie calls the girls to tell them that she joined the rival crew, 2-Cute-4-U with Sonia and Jesse. Guest stars: Yolanda "Yo-Yo" Whitaker as Duchess, Missy Fierro as Madison Ortiz, Noah Cottrell as Ivan, Mirabelle Lee as Sonia, Ashton Elijah as Jesse, Samantha Smith as Roxie
15	"Goin' for Gold!"	Leslie Kolins Small	Norman Vance Jr.	May 12, 2023	115	0.09
It's the day of the Battle 2-B Golden Skate Competition and the stakes are high. The We-B-Girlz are more nervous than ever, after seeing 2-Cute-4-U's performance. Meanwhile, Cal and Deb discover that Miss Pecolia is giving up her business and gives the location to Cal and Deb. Paris tries to reconcile with Roxie, but she doesn't want to hear it. Later, Cal accidentally reveals that Roxie's parents had gotten a divorce and she hasn't been taking it well. The girls understand why she has been so hostile lately. London is still trying to figure out how to confess his love for Madison, which he does right before We-B-Girlz and 2-Cute-4-U's tiebreaker. The two share a kiss and begin cueing up the music for the tiebreaker. We-B-Girlz won after Roxie fell during the final flip stunt. This ultimately results in the We-B-Girlz becoming goldens. Guest stars: Yolanda "Yo-Yo" Whitaker as Duchess, Missy Fierro as Madison Ortiz, Mirabelle Lee as Sonia, Ashton Elijah as Jesse, Samantha Smith as Roxie, Renee Lockett as Miss Pecolia

== Release ==
Saturdays premiered on March 24, 2023 on Disney Channel. The first six episodes were released on Disney+ on March 25, 2023, resulting in episodes 3–6 being released prior to their televised premieres. Similarly, episodes 7–11 were added to Disney+ on April 26, 2023, resulting in episode 11 being released prior to its television debut later that week.

The series was removed from Disney+ on September 27, 2024.

== Reception ==
=== Critical response ===
Joel Keller of Decider asserted, "Saturdays has some of the broad physical humor that your kids will love, but it gives off a fun vibe and is just clever enough to keep parents engaged, too." Alex Reif of Laughing Place said "Saturdays adds another dimension to the series via the artistry of roller skating. In the same way that dance elevated Shake It Up, choreographed roller skating gives the show some artistic flair that sets it apart." He also adds "Colorful, musical, and fun, Saturdays leans into nostalgia with its approach to storytelling and the roller skating theme. The show is full of Black joy and Black American culture, and while Disney Channel has been tapping into this same demographic for decades, Saturdays is impacted by recent pushes for more culturally specific kinds of stories from major companies like Disney." Ashley Moulton of Common Sense Media gave Saturdays a grade of four out of five stars, noted the presence of positive messages and role models, citing friendship, complimented the humor of the show, and called the storylines "quite wholesome."

=== Ratings ===
Viewership and ratings per season of Saturdays
Season	Episodes	First aired		Last aired		Avg. viewers (millions)
Season	Episodes	Date	Viewers (millions)	Date	Viewers (millions)	Avg. viewers (millions)
1	15	March 24, 2023	0.12	May 12, 2023	0.09	0.09

=== Awards and nominations ===
Year	Award	Category	Recipient	Result	Ref.
2024	Make-Up Artists and Hair Stylists Guild	Best Hair Styling - Children and Teen Television Programming	Ruhamah Taylor, Brittany Powell, Kelvin Ingram Jr., and Nadling Fletcher	Nominated	
2024	Kidscreen Awards	Kids Programming – Best Live-Action Series	Saturdays	Nominated	
2024	NAACP Image Awards	Outstanding Writing in a Comedy Series	Norman Vance Jr.	Won	
