= Shemar Moore =

American actor (born 1970)

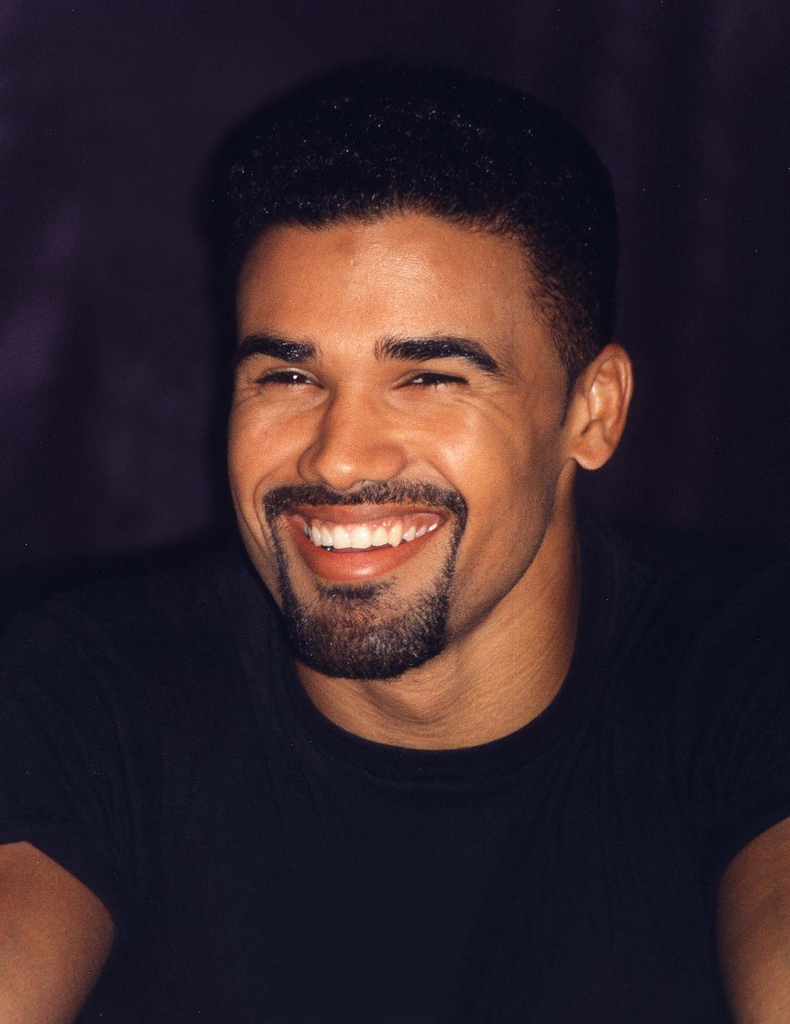
- Moore in 1995
- Born: Shemar Franklin Moore; April 20, 1970 (age 56); Oakland, California, U.S.
- Education: Santa Clara University (BA)
- Occupations: Actor; producer; model; presenter
- Years active: 1994–present
- Partner: Jesiree Dizon (2020–present)
- Children: 1
- Awards: Daytime Emmy Award for Outstanding Supporting Actor in a Drama Series (2000); NAACP Image Awards (8)

Shemar Franklin Moore (/ʃəˈmɑːr/ shə-MAR; born April 20, 1970) is an American actor. His notable roles include Malcolm Winters on The Young and the Restless (1994–2002, 2004–05, 2014, 2019, 2023, 2026), Derek Morgan on Criminal Minds (2005–17), and the lead role of Sergeant Daniel "Hondo" Harrelson on S.W.A.T. (2017–25)—all on CBS. In film, he is known for playing G.U.N. Agent Randall Handel in the second and third films of the Sonic the Hedgehog film series. Moore was also the third permanent host of Soul Train from 1999 to 2003.

Moore has won eight NAACP Image Awards as well as the 2000 Daytime Emmy Award for Outstanding Supporting Actor in a Drama Series for his work on The Young and the Restless. He was nominated for a People's Choice Award in 2016 for his work on Criminal Minds.

== Early life ==
Moore was born in Oakland, California, the son of Marilyn Wilson, a teacher, and Sherrod Moore. Moore's father was African American and his mother, who was born in the Roxbury neighborhood of Boston, Massachusetts, was of Irish and French-Canadian descent. His mother, who had a degree in mathematics, worked as a teacher in Bahrain and Denmark. Moore moved with her to Denmark as an infant, and then to Bahrain when he was four, where he attended a British private school until the age of seven. His grandmother is from Quebec City, Canada. Moore cites civil unrest, interracial relationships being taboo, and racism in the U.S. in the 1970s as part of the reason his mother moved abroad with him. Returning to the U.S. in 1977, the family moved to Chico, California, where his mother worked at a clinic, before later moving to Palo Alto. A gifted and talented child, Moore attended The Nueva School in Hillsborough, California before graduating from Gunn High School in Palo Alto. Moore was awarded an athletic scholarship to attend Santa Clara University where he played varsity baseball as both a pitcher and an outfielder all four years. He holds a Bachelor of Arts degree in communications with a minor in Theater Arts.

== Career ==
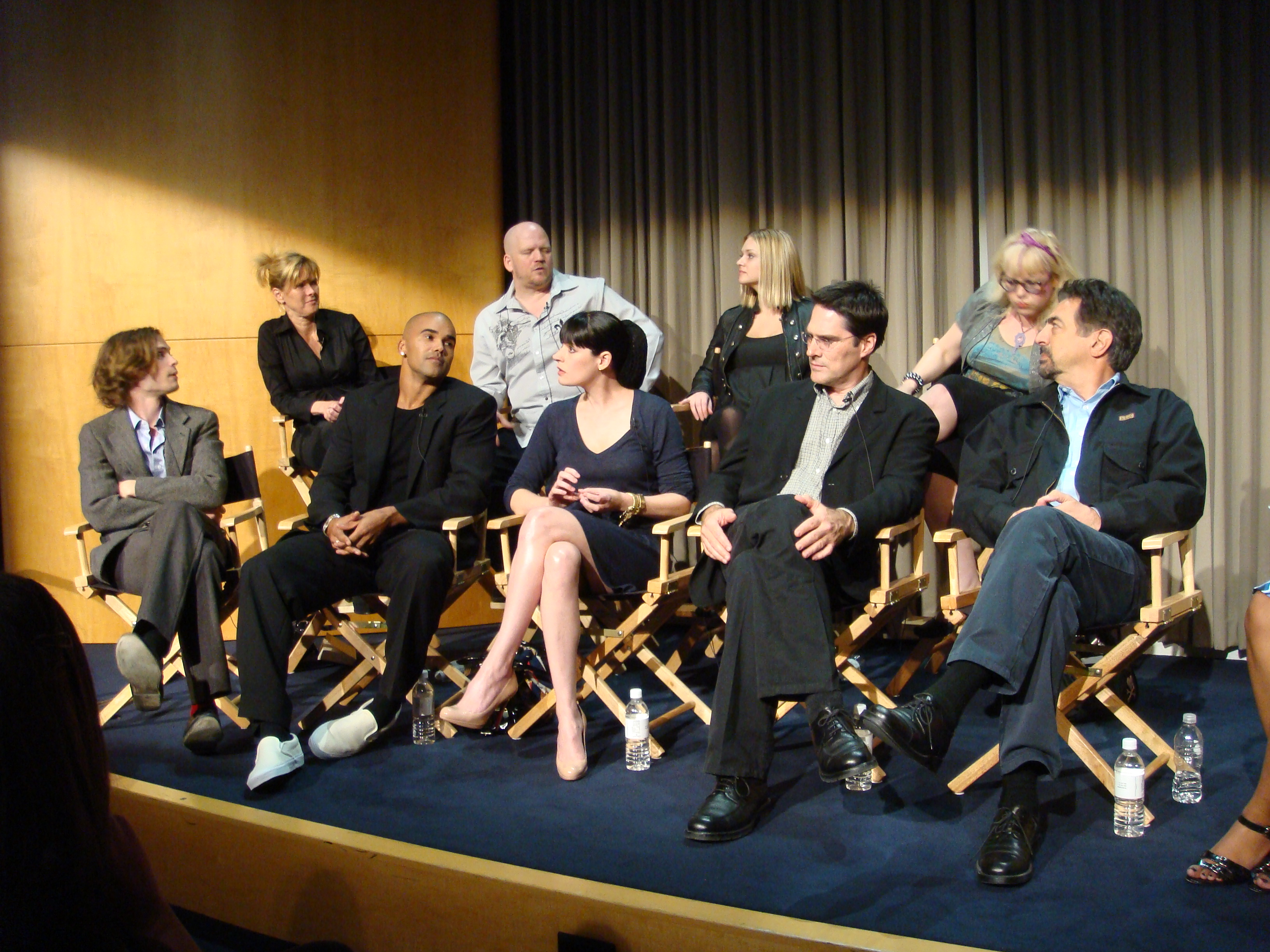
Moore (third from left) with other Criminal Minds cast members

Moore is best known for his role as Malcolm Winters on the CBS television soap opera The Young and the Restless for more than a decade. In November 2004, he returned to The Young and the Restless after originally planning to leave the show, but after a few months he dropped back to recurring status and left in September 2005. In 2007, he said, "My time is done on Y&R. I did eight solid years as Malcolm."

During his time on The Young and the Restless, Moore was the host of the syndicated version of the series Soul Train from 1999 until 2003, and he appeared in the 2001 feature film The Brothers. He portrayed Detective Jesse Reese on the television series Birds of Prey from 2002 to 2003. Moore played Emery Simms in the 2004 film Motives alongside Vivica Fox and Golden Brooks, and had a supporting role in the film Diary of a Mad Black Woman. He also appeared in the romantic comedy The Seat Filler with Kelly Rowland and Duane Martin.

In 2005, Moore began playing Derek Morgan in the original cast of Criminal Minds. In March 2016, he left the role, after 251 episodes, in episode 18 of season 11, "A Beautiful Disaster".

In February 2017, it was announced that Moore would star in CBS's new series titled S.W.A.T., based on the 2003 film and 1975 television series of the same name. The show ran for eight seasons with the series finale released in May 2025. The same month, a spin-off series, S.W.A.T. EXILES, was announced with Moore set to return as Daniel "Hondo" Harrelson.

In June 2021, it was announced that Moore had joined the cast of Sonic the Hedgehog 2, as Randall Handel. He also stars as the "Unnecessary Action Hero" in a series of commercials for Paycom.

Moore worked as a model during his college years. He is signed to DNA Model Management in New York City. Moore appeared on the March 2009 issue of Men's Fitness magazine.

== Personal life ==
Moore dated soccer player Shawna Gordon from 2014 to 2016. In 2018, he dated Quantico actress Anabelle Acosta. In 2023, he announced the birth of his first child with his girlfriend, Jesiree Dizon. In 2025, it was reported Dizon and Moore were no longer involved, though Dizon was identified as Moore’s "significant other" in 2026.

Moore formed a retail clothing company known as Baby Girl LLC. The company's profits are used to help fight multiple sclerosis, a disease Moore's mother had. The organization's name is derived from a phrase used by Moore's character, Derek Morgan, on Criminal Minds. In 2016, actor Keith Tisdell pleaded guilty to grand theft charges after stealing more than $60,000 from Baby Girl LLC, and agreed to repay the amount.

== Filmography ==
=== Film ===
Year	Title	Role	Notes	Ref.
1997	Hav Plenty	Chris		
1998	Butter	Freddy Roland		
2001	The Brothers	Terry White		
2004	Motives	Emery Simms		
2004	Greener	Ricky Johnson		
2005	The Seat Filler	Trent		
2005	Diary of a Mad Black Woman	Orlando		
2007	Motives 2	Emery Simms		
2013	Kill Me, Deadly	Bill the Piano Player		
2014	Justice League: War	Victor Stone / Cyborg	Voice role	
2015	Justice League: Throne of Atlantis	Victor Stone / Cyborg	Voice role	
2016	The Bounce Back	Matthew Taylor		
2016	Justice League vs. Teen Titans	Victor Stone / Cyborg	Voice role	
2018	The Death of Superman	Victor Stone / Cyborg	Voice role	
2019	Reign of the Supermen	Victor Stone / Cyborg	Voice role	
2020	Justice League Dark: Apokolips War	Victor Stone / Cyborg	Voice role	
2022	Sonic the Hedgehog 2	Randall Handel		
2024	Sonic the Hedgehog 3	Randall Handel		

=== Television ===
Key
†	Denotes television productions that have not yet been released

Year	Title	Role	Notes
1994–2005, 2014, 2019, 2023, 2026	The Young and the Restless	Malcolm Winters	Contract role (1994–2005) Guest appearances (2014–23)
1995	Living Single	Jon Marc	Episode: "The Last Temptation"
1996	The Jamie Foxx Show	Elister	Episode: "Kiss & Tell"
1997	The Nanny	Malcolm Winters	Episode: "The Heather Biblow Story"
1997	Arliss	Sammy Stilton	Episode: "How to Be a Good Listener"
1998	Chicago Hope	Bobby Barrett	Episode: "Waging Bull"
1998	Mama Flora's Family	Lincoln Fleming	Television film
1999	Moesha	Earl Thomas	Episode: "Had to Be You"
1999	For Your Love	Dakota Collins	Episode: "Baby Boom"
1999	Malcolm & Eddie	Ty	Episode: "Won't Power"
1999–2003	Soul Train	Himself	Host
2000	How to Marry a Billionaire: A Christmas Tale	Jason Hunt	Television film
2002–03	Birds of Prey	Jesse Reese	Main role; 14 episodes
2003	Chasing Alice	Adam	Television film
2004	Nikki and Nora	Corby	Television film
2004	Reversible Errors	Collins Farwell	Television film
2004	Half & Half	Amani Love	Episode: "The Big Good Help Is Hard to Find Episode"
2005–17	Criminal Minds	Derek Morgan	253 episodes Main role (seasons 1–11) Special guest (seasons 12–13)
2017–25	S.W.A.T.	Sergeant Daniel "Hondo" Harrelson Jr.	Lead role; 163 episodes Producer (seasons 1–6); Executive producer (seasons 7–8)
2020	American Soul	—N/a	Executive producer (season 2)
2026	S.W.A.T. Exiles	Sergeant Daniel "Hondo" Harrelson Jr.	Lead role; Executive producer

== Awards and nominations ==
Year	Award	Category	Work	Result
1996	Daytime Emmy Awards	Outstanding Younger Actor in a Drama Series	The Young and the Restless	Nominated
1996	NAACP Image Awards	Outstanding Actor in a Daytime Drama Series	The Young and the Restless	Nominated
1997	NAACP Image Awards	Outstanding Actor in a Daytime Drama Series	The Young and the Restless	Nominated
1997	Daytime Emmy Awards	Outstanding Younger Actor in a Drama Series	The Young and the Restless	Nominated
1998	NAACP Image Awards	Outstanding Actor in a Daytime Drama Series	The Young and the Restless	Won
1999	NAACP Image Awards	Outstanding Actor in a Daytime Drama Series	The Young and the Restless	Won
2000	NAACP Image Awards	Outstanding Actor in a Daytime Drama Series	The Young and the Restless	Won
2000	Daytime Emmy Awards	Outstanding Supporting Actor in a Drama Series	The Young and the Restless	Won
2001	NAACP Image Awards	Outstanding Actor in a Daytime Drama Series	The Young and the Restless	Won
2002	NAACP Image Awards	Outstanding Actor in a Daytime Drama Series	The Young and the Restless	Won
2005	NAACP Image Awards	Outstanding Actor in a Daytime Drama Series	The Young and the Restless	Won
2005	Black Reel Awards	Best Actor, Independent Film	Motives	Nominated
2006	NAACP Image Awards	Outstanding Actor in a Daytime Drama Series	The Young and the Restless	Won
2006	NAACP Image Awards	Outstanding Actor in a Motion Picture	Diary of a Mad Black Woman	Nominated
2014	NAACP Image Awards	Outstanding Actor in a Drama Series	Criminal Minds	Nominated
2015	NAACP Image Awards	Outstanding Actor in a Drama Series	Criminal Minds	Won
2016	People's Choice Awards	Favorite Crime Drama TV Actor	Criminal Minds	Nominated

Preceded by Mystro Clark	Host of Soul Train; 2000–2003	Succeeded by Dorian Gregory
