= Blue Hill Avenue (film) =

2001 film by Craig Ross Jr.

- DVD cover
- Directed by: Craig Ross Jr.
- Written by: Craig Ross Jr.
- Produced by: Mike Erwin; Bryan Hinds; J. Max Kirishima
- Starring: Allen Payne; Andrew Divoff; Clarence Williams III; William Forsythe
- Narrated by: Allen Payne
- Cinematography: Carl Bartels
- Edited by: Craig Ross Jr.
- Music by: Jan Pomerans; Cruel Timothy; Lo'ren "Lo Diggs" Dagen Jr
- Production companies: Asiatic Associates; Cahoots Productions; Den Pictures
- Distributed by: Artisan Entertainment
- Release dates: June 5, 2001 (Acapulco Black Film Festival); July 13, 2003 (United States)
- Running time: 120 minutes
- Country: United States
- Language: English

Blue Hill Avenue is a 2001 American crime drama film written, directed, edited, and executive produced by Craig Ross Jr. Produced by Asiatic Associates, Cahoots Productions and Den Pictures, the film is about young criminals in Roxbury, a neighborhood of Boston, Massachusetts. The film stars Allen Payne, Angelle Brooks, Michael Taliferro, William L. Johnson, Aaron D. Spears, Andrew Divoff, Clarence Williams III and William Forsythe. The film's title is derived from Blue Hill Avenue, a major street in Mattapan, Roxbury and Dorchester.

== Plot ==
Tristan (the leader), Simon (the right-hand man), E-Bone (the hot head) and Money (the mediator) are four smart friends growing up in the tough Roxbury section of Boston in the late 1970s. Starting out as small-time dope dealers on Blue Hill Avenue in Roxbury, they eventually go to work for Benny, a major player in the Boston crime scene.

As the four friends grow up and become the biggest dealers in the city, things become increasingly heated: Tristan's wife wants him to leave the business because she's pregnant, Tristan finds out his sister is hooked on drugs and is alienated from his family, Simon becomes obsessed with a near-death experience and expects to die, cops dog their tracks trying every trick in and out of the book to catch them. Benny, their main supplier, wants them out of the business for good.

Worse, it becomes clear one of the four is trying to sell the others out to the cops. In the end, Tristan faces Benny down alone. Will he be able to get out of the business—and the life—for good?

== Cast ==
- Allen Payne as Tristan
  - W.B. Alexander as young Tristan
- Angelle Brooks as Martine
  - Diane Fauteux as young Martine
- Michael "Bear" Taliferro as Simon
  - Dana Blair as young Simon
- William L. Johnson as "E-Bone"
  - Brandon Hammond as young E-Bone
- Aaron D. Spears as "Money"
  - Percy Daggs III as young Money
- Andrew Divoff as Detective Tyler
- Richard Lawson as Uncle Rob
- Marlon Young as "Twinkie"
- Dee Freeman as Violet
- Clarence Williams III as Benny
- William Forsythe as Detective Torrance
- LaTamra Smith as Nicole
- Myquan Jackson as Wren
- William Butler as "Big Time"
- Chris Thornton as Lathan
- William Springfield as "Soul Train"
- Pooch Hall (credited as Marion Hall) as Billy "Schlep Rock" Brown
- Kenny Robinson as Sam
- Emily Bruhier as Martine's girlfriend

== Production ==
Blue Hill Avenue was filmed in the Canadian city of Saint John, New Brunswick because, as described by Ross, "it looked like an Eastern town." Buildings used as filming locations within the city include the St. Joseph's Hospital and the Saint John High School. Myquan Jackson (January 9, 1970 – October 23, 2023), who played Wren in the film, wrote five songs for the film's soundtrack.

== Reception ==
=== Critical response ===
Metacritic, which uses a weighted average, assigned the film a score of 41 out of 100, based on four critics, indicating "mixed or average" reviews.

Upon the film's 2003 theatrical release, Robert Koehler of Variety critiqued it as a "dourly serious film about drug dealers in Boston's South End ghetto" and praised the cast for their performances, though adding that the "transition from the younger performers to the older thesps playing the same characters is painfully unconvincing." He further noted the production and likened it to a "classical crime pic rather than an exploiter," but criticized Ross' repetitive use of tracking shots and close-ups. Overall, Koehler considered the film to be "better than the delay would suggest" and suggested that it could find success "in ancillary with the right marketing."

Kevin Thomas of the Los Angeles Times praised the film, describing how it "departs dramatically from the standard ghetto drug action picture to offer a somber, grueling look at the day-to-day existence of four friends in the Boston area who get caught up in the drug trade in junior high school."

=== Accolades ===
Award	Award category	Recipients	Result
2001 Acapulco Black Film Festival	Best U.S. Film	Craig Ross Jr.	Won
2002 Black Reel Awards	Best Independent Actor (Theatrical)	Allen Payne	Won
2002 Black Reel Awards	Best Independent Film (Theatrical)		Nominated
2001 Urbanworld Film Festival	Best Director	Craig Ross Jr.	Won

== See also ==
- List of hood films
