= Motives (film) =

2004 film

- Directed by: Craig Ross Jr.
- Written by: Kelsey Scott
- Produced by: William Packer; Vivica A. Fox; Rob Hardy
- Starring: Vivica A. Fox; Shemar Moore; Golden Brooks; Sean Blakemore; Keshia Knight Pulliam
- Production companies: Rainforest Films; Willpower Productions; Rahlo Productions; Foxy Brown Productions; L. Richardson Entertainment
- Distributed by: Columbia Tristar Home Entertainment
- Release date: February 24, 2004
- Running time: 83 minutes
- Country: United States
- Language: English

Motives is a 2004 erotic thriller film starring Vivica A. Fox, Shemar Moore, Golden Brooks, Sean Blakemore and Keshia Knight Pulliam. The direct-to-video sequel, Motives 2, was released in 2007.

== Plot ==
Emery Simms is a highly educated business tycoon whose life takes a turn for the worse when he engages in an adulterous fling with the wildly free-spirited and exotic Allanah James. Emery accidentally kills a man who tries to get information out of him, which is then witnessed by another man who flees. Emery does not notice the dead man's cell phone, which has all their calls logged in.

He then makes a phone call to his friend who does not answer. Later, he meets Allanah whose car has broken down. He gives her a ride to her job unaware she is working an angle to get what she wants. He then calls her and insists they have dinner. They do, but the police follow them, seeing them make out as does another man that is following Allanah. The crazed man comes to the restaurant and attacks Emery.

Emery goes to see Allanah and sees that the place she lives in is unsatisfactory, so he takes her to one of his properties - a condo. She makes herself at home and even invites a friend over, who tells her that she can keep the condo and lifestyle if there "is a hole in the condom". Emery drops by for sex and she has her friend wait outside so she can do what she needs to with Emery. Allanah's friend ends up joining them.

Emery then visits his friend Brandon Collier, gives him a box cutter and tells him to help him unpack. The two reminisce about the fun times they had in college. Allanah meets Emery in a park where children are playing and announces she is pregnant. Shocked, Emery tells her to abort the baby, but Allanah tells him no.

She then sets up a meeting with Connie, Emery's wife, sending her a romantic note, which Connie thinks is from Emery. When Connie arrives at a park where the meeting is to take place she finds a beautifully dressed table with flowers and a bottled of chilled wine waiting. Allanah then appears and the two women sit down for a chat.

Allanah tells Connie she is pregnant with Emery's child and asks her for money. Connie gives her a check for $100,000 then returns home to pack her bags to leave Emery. When Emery walks in the two get into an argument over Allanah, her pregnancy and the pay off. In the meantime, Allanah returns to the condo where her husband, Derrick Woods, shows up demanding money. Emery soon follows to confront her about the meeting with Connie, and finds Allanah and Derrick having sex. He tells them both to leave and demands that Allanah give back the check. Derrick goes ballistic on Allanah upon finding out what she did, as Emery searches her purse for the check. Emery hurls an insult at Derrick and the two fight. In the struggle, Emery drops the check, Allanah picks it up then flees the condo very much alive.

Allanah soon turns up dead, her throat cut. Emery is asked to come to the police station and is interrogated by Detective Morgan about Allanah's murder.

Emery insists that when he left the condo Allanah was alive, just as Derrick insists the same in his interrogation. They are both released upon investigation of the murder. Connie returns to Emery, but still doesn't trust him.

While she is home, Emery goes in search of pictures taken of him having sex with Allanah in his car, but cannot find them. The movie fast forwards to an event for wayward youth, where Connie is giving a speech. During the speech, Emery is arrested for Allanah's murder.

Before this happened, he goes to see Brandon who tells him that he wants Connie and his life. The two fight, Emery stops, leaving Brandon alive. After Emery is sentenced and sent to prison, Connie visits him and presents him with divorce papers, forcing him to sign them. Reluctantly, he does. Connie then gets up and walks away as Emery screams for her to come back.

As Emery is being led back to his cell, he sees Connie walks to Brandon. She looks back at him as the two embrace and with a smug look Brandon stares intently at Emery. In Emery's flashback, the viewer sees and reveals that it was Brandon who set him and Allanah up, murdered her, and sent a box of evidence to Detectives Pierce and Morgan all in an attempt to get Connie all to himself. Emery, in a fit of rage, then attempts to attack Brandon, but security guards hold him back. Yelling to Connie that it was Brandon who was the cause of everything that has happened, Connie walks out the door. Brandon winks at Emery and leaves as he's being dragged back to his cell, still yelling for Connie to return. The film ends with credits revealing that Emery is currently awaiting for an appeal for the murders of Allanah James and Kenneth Stroud.

== Cast ==
- Vivica A. Fox as Constance "Connie" Simms
- Shemar Moore as Emery Simms
- Golden Brooks as Allanah James
- Sean Blakemore as Brandon Collier
- Joe Torry as Derrick Woods
- Victoria Rowell as Detective Pierce
- Keshia Knight Pulliam as Letrice
- Mel Jackson as Detective Morgan
- William L. Johnson as Ray
- Lil Zane as M'Kai
- Caryn Ward Ross as Gwendolyn

== Release ==
Columbia Tristar Home Entertainment released Motives on DVD on February 24, 2004.

== Reception ==
Don Houston of DVD Talk rated it 3/5 stars and wrote, "Motives combines some fine acting, a solid story, and deep characters, making it worth your time and money." David Johnson of DVD Verdict called it unoriginal neo-noir film that delivers the expected sex, betrayal, and plot twists without relying on blaxploitation cliches. Beyond Hollywood called it "so run-of-the-mill and so lacking in originality as to be insulting" but complimented Ross's directing.
