= Golden Brooks =

American actress (b. 1970)

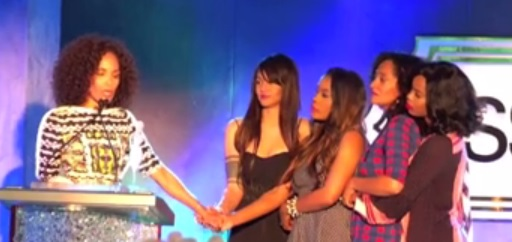
- Left to right: Mara Brock Akil with Persia White, Brooks, Tracee Ellis Ross, and Jill Marie Jones in 2013
- Born: December 1, 1970 (age 55); San Francisco, California, U.S.
- Education: University of California, Berkeley; Sarah Lawrence College
- Occupation: Actress
- Years active: 1993–present
- Partner: D. B. Woodside (2008–2010)
- Children: 1

Golden Brooks (born December 1, 1970) is an American actress. She began her career with starring role in the Showtime comedy series, Linc's (1998–2000), and later appeared in the films Timecode (2000) and Impostor (2001).

From 2000 to 2008, Brooks starred as Maya Wilkes in the UPN/The CW comedy series Girlfriends, for which she received two NAACP Image Award for Outstanding Actress in a Comedy Series nominations. She also has appeared in films Motives (2004), Beauty Shop (2005), Something New (2006) and The Darkest Minds (2018). In 2019, she received critical acclaim for her performance in the TNT limited drama series I Am the Night.

== Early life ==
Brooks was born December 1, 1970, in San Francisco, California. A classically trained dancer, she studied and taught ballet, jazz, and modern dance. She studied literature and sociology and is a graduate of UC Berkeley where she majored in Media Representation of Minorities with a minor in theater. She earned a Master's degree from Sarah Lawrence College.

== Career ==
In her early career, Brooks was active in the Rodney Theater Company. On television, she has appeared on The Adventures of Pete & Pete, Promised Land, and The Jamie Foxx Show as a girl named Nancy, whom Jamie confuses with Fancy. Brooks also appeared in a number of films, like Hell's Kitchen, Timecode, and Impostor. From 1998 to 2000, she starred alongside Pam Grier in the Showtime comedy series, Linc's.

Brooks is best known for her portrayal of the character Maya Wilkes, Joan's former sharp-tongued secretary and now acclaimed author, on the CW sitcom Girlfriends, in which she starred alongside Tracee Ellis Ross, Persia White and Jill Marie Jones from 2000 to 2008. In 2001, she appeared in an episode of Moesha, portraying Maya Wilkes. Brooks also directed the 2006 episode titled "Hustle & Dough," and wrote the 2007 episode titled "Snap Back," which featured guest star Erykah Badu. The character of Maya is portrayed to be several years younger than the other characters Joan, Toni, and Lynn, but, in reality, Brooks is actually the eldest of the four actors. For her performance in Girlfriends, Brooks received a BET Award for Outstanding Supporting Actress in a Comedy Series in 2004, as well as two nominations for the NAACP Image Award for Outstanding Actress in a Comedy Series in 2003 and 2008.

Brooks has won Black Reel Awards for her portrayal in the 2004 film Motives, co-starring with Vivica A. Fox and Shemar Moore. She also has co-starred in Beauty Shop (2005) and Something New (2006). In 2008, Brooks was cast as Kim Kaswell in the Lifetime comedy-drama pilot Drop Dead Diva, but later was replaced by Kate Levering. In 2011, she starred in the independent film The Inheritance. In 2012, Brooks joined the cast of Hart of Dixie in season 2 playing Ruby Jeffries, Mayor Lavon Hayes' ex-girlfriend from high school, who runs against him for mayor. In 2014, Brooks stars as one of five leads on the TV One reality series, Hollywood Divas.

In 2015, Brooks was cast in a recurring role of Patrick Stewart's lead character's ex-wife in the Starz comedy series, Blunt Talk. In 2016, she was cast in a series regular role opposite Damon Wayans Sr. in the Fox pilot Lethal Weapon. Brooks was fired from Lethal Weapon after the project's table read, and Keesha Sharp, her Girlfriends co-star, later replaced her in role.

In 2017, Brooks was cast as the lead character's mother in The Darkest Minds, a young adult dystopian thriller directed by Jennifer Yuh Nelson. She also was cast in the Paramount Network drama series Yellowstone starring Kevin Costner. Later she was cast in a series regular role on the TNT drama series I Am the Night directed by Patty Jenkins, playing the mother of the lead character. She received critical acclaim for her performance in I Am the Night. "Golden Brooks elevating every scene she's in", said Daniel Fienberg in his review for The Hollywood Reporter. In 2019, she reunited with her Girlfriends co-stars Tracee Ellis Ross, Jill Marie Jones and Persia White in the episode of ABC comedy series Black-ish. In 2023, Brooks starred in the coming-of-age comedy series, Saturdays as a mother of lead, and played the leading role in the Tubi Holiday comedy film, Hot Girl Winter. In 2024 she had a recurring role in the Starz crime drama series, Power Book II: Ghost.

== Personal life ==
Brooks and fellow actor D. B. Woodside were in a relationship from 2008 to 2010; they have a daughter together, born in 2009.

== Filmography ==
=== Film ===
Year	Title	Role	Notes
1997	Drive by: A Love Story	Young Tuli	Short film
1998	Hell's Kitchen	Gold	
1998	Zero Stress	The Dancer	
2000	Timecode	Onyx Richardson	
2001	Asylum	Angela	Short film
2001	Impostor	Cale's Sister	
2004	Motives	Allannah James	Direct-to-video
2005	Beauty Shop	Chanel	
2006	Something New	Suzette	
2008	A Good Man Is Hard to Find	Rachel	Direct-to-video
2010	Polish Bar	Ebony	
2011	The Mudman	Mother	
2011	The Perfect Gift	Sandra Harris	
2011	The Inheritance	Karen	
2012	A Beautiful Soul	Anita Stevens	
2012	The Great Divide	Kim	
2015	Supermodel	Patricia Gillard	
2016	Definitely Divorcing	Tonisha	
2016	My B.F.F.	Sharice Brown	
2016	She's Got a Plan	Herself	
2017	Almost Amazing	Wendy	
2017	The White Sistas	Stone White	
2018	The Darkest Minds	Molly Daly	
2018	Everything That Glitters	Victoria Robinson	
2018	He Watches Over Me	Jasmine	
2020	Kiss Me for Christmas	Millie Michaels	
2021	Coins Forever	Veronica	
2022	Block Party	Tasha McQueen	
2023	Packz	Carla	
2023	Hot Girl Winter	Jess	

=== Television ===
Year	Title	Role	Notes
1996	The Adventures of Pete & Pete	Heather	Episode: "Crisis in the Love Zone"
1998–2000	Linc's	CeCe Jennings	Main Cast
1999	Promised Land	Erica Sims	Episode: "Leaving the Life"
2000	The Parkers	Chris	Episode: "Since I Lost My Baby"
2000	The Jamie Foxx Show	Nancy	Episode: "Double or Nothing"
2000–08	Girlfriends	Maya Denise Wilkes	Main Cast
2001	Moesha	Maya Wilkes	Episode: "That's My Mama"
2002	Haunted	Rachel Landry	Episode: "Abby"
2004	Star Trek: Enterprise	Alicia Travers	Episodes: "Storm Front: Part 1 & 2"
2005	Eve	LaDonna	Episode: "Testing Testing HIV"
2008	CSI: Miami	Pam Dashell	Episode: "And How Does That Make You Kill?"
2011	The Exes	Bree Miller	Episode: "Pilot"
2012	In Sickness and in Health	Hope	TV movie
2012–13	Hart of Dixie	Ruby Jeffries	Recurring cast: Season 2
2014	Second Chance Christmas	-	TV movie
2014–16	Hollywood Divas	Herself	Main Cast
2015	In the Cut	Dawn	Episode: "The Beat Goes On"
2015	Nicki	Monique	Episode: "Pilot"
2015–16	Blunt Talk	Vivian	Recurring cast
2018	5th Ward The Series	Erica Ward	Episode: "Flossin'"
2018	Ladies of the Law	Monique	Main Cast
2019	I Am the Night	Jimmie Lee Greenwade	Main Cast
2019	Black-ish	Malika	Episode: "Feminisn't"
2020	BET Her Presents: The Waiting Room	Cynthia Howard	Episode: "A Long Look in the Mirror"
2021	Station 19	Vivienne	Episodes: "Say Her Name" & "Forever and Ever, Amen"
2022	The Good Doctor	Dr. Isabel Barnes	Episode: "Boys Don't Cry"
2023	Saturdays	Deb Johnson	Main Cast
2024	The Ms. Pat Show	Tanya	Episode: "Pick Up Your Feelings"
2024	Power Book II: Ghost	Janet Stewart	Season 4: 3 episodes

== Awards and nominations ==
Year	Awards	Category	Recipient	Outcome
2003	NAACP Image Awards	NAACP Image Award for Outstanding Actress in a Comedy Series	"Girlfriends"	Nominated
2004	BET Awards	BET Award for Outstanding Supporting Actress in a Comedy Series	"Girlfriends"	Won
2005	Black Reel Awards	Black Reel Award for Best Actress in the Independent Film	"Motives"	Nominated
2008	NAACP Image Awards	NAACP Image Award for Outstanding Actress in a Comedy Series	"Girlfriends"	Nominated
2011	American Black Film Festival	American Black Film Festival Award for Best Actress	"The Inheritance"	Won
