= Michael Taliferro =

American actor (1961–2006)

- Born: August 23, 1961; Fort Worth, Texas, U.S.
- Died: May 4, 2006 (aged 44); Los Angeles, California, U.S.
- Occupation: Actor
- Years active: 1982–2006
- Partner: Cathey L. Tyree
- Children: 5

Michael Taliferro (August 23, 1961 – May 4, 2006) was an American actor. He is best known for Life (1999), and The Replacements (2000), and made guest appearances on The Jamie Foxx Show, Martin, and The Parkers.

== Career ==
Known for his intimidating stature, Taliferro was signed by the Washington Redskins in 1984, followed by two seasons in the USFL with the Denver Gold in 1985 and the Arizona Outlaws in 1986, finishing his athletic career with the British Columbia Lions in the Canadian Football League the following year.

Soon after, Taliferro moved to California and began his acting career. He was discovered by film director Tony Scott, who offered him a bit part in The Last Boy Scout. His first credited film appearance was in the 1993 film Sister Act 2: Back in the Habit, where he played the role of a security guard. He also made appearances in the films Bad Boys, Life, Half Past Dead, Ride or Die, You Got Served and Blue Hill Avenue. In 2003, Taliferro completed filming A Day in the Life. He also directed and produced Steppin: The Movie, which was completed in 2007.

== Personal life ==
Taliferro was born in Fort Worth, Texas, and had a brother, James and two sisters, Olga and Cheryl.

Taliferro was a Christian and went to a Christian school. He attended Texas Christian University. He never married but was engaged to Cathey L. Tyree and had five children.

== Death ==
Taliferro died of a stroke on May 4, 2006, in Los Angeles, California, at the age of 44. He was interred at Spring Hill Cemetery in Brooksville, Florida.

== Filmography ==
=== Film ===
Year	Title	Role	Notes
1993	Sister Act 2: Back in the Habit	Security Guard	Credited as Michael "Bear" Taliferro
1995	Bad Boys	Black Carjacker	
1996	A Thin Line Between Love and Hate	Club Security #1	
1996	Misfit Patrol	Bear & Cub Band	
1998	Armageddon	Roughneck #2	Credited as Michael "Bear" Taliferro
1999	Life	Goldmouth	Credited as Michael "Bear" Taliferro
2000	The Replacements	André Jackson	Credited as Michael "Bear" Taliferro
2001	Blue Hill Avenue	Simon	Credited as Michael "Bear" Taliferro
2002	Half Past Dead	Little Joe	Credited as Michael "Bear" Taliferro
2003	Rude Boy: The Jamaican Don	Biggs	
2003	Ride or Die	B Free	
2004	You Got Served	Emerald	Credited as Michael "Bear" Taliferro
2009	A Day in the Life	Brian Smith	(final film role)

=== Television ===
Year	Title	Role	Notes
1994	Witch Hunt	Zombie	TV movie Credited as Michael "Bear" Taliferro
1996	The Drew Carey Show	Delivery Man #1	Episode: "Something Wick This Way Comes"
1996	The Jamie Foxx Show	Wide Clyde	3 episodes
1997	Martin	Hammer	2 episodes
2000	Arli$$	Otis	Episode: "I Get Involved"
2002	The Parkers	Kyle	Episode: "The Dates from Hell"
