= Motives 2 =

2007 direct-to-video film

Motives 2: Retribution
- Directed by: Aaron Courseault
- Written by: Kelsey Scott
- Produced by: Dianne Ashford; Angelique Bones; Rob Hardy; Will Packer; Lita Richardson
- Starring: Brian J. White; Vivica A. Fox; Sean Blakemore; Sharon Leal; Drew Sidora; Joe Torry
- Music by: Steven Gutheinz
- Production companies: Symmetry Entertainment; Rainforest Films; Foxy Brown Productions; L. Richardson Entertainment
- Distributed by: Sony Pictures Home Entertainment
- Release date: May 1, 2007
- Country: United States
- Language: English

Motives 2: Retribution is a 2007 direct-to-video sequel to the 2004 thriller film Motives starring Brian J. White, Vivica A. Fox and Sean Blakemore.

== Plot summary ==
The sequel to Motives picks up three years after the original. Emery Simms is a rarity—an innocent man in prison. On the outside, his ex-wife Connie is married to his best friend-turned-rival Brandon, and they're attempting to make a normal life. After Simms is killed during a brawl in prison, his brother Donovan returns to discover the real reason for his brother's death. The web of lies and murder may prove just as poisonous to Donovan as it was to his late brother.

== Cast ==
- Brian J. White as Donovan Cook
- Vivica A. Fox as Constance "Connie" Simms
- Sean Blakemore as Brandon Collier
- Sharon Leal as Nina Welch
- Drew Sidora as René
- Joe Torry as Derrick Woods
- Mel Jackson as Detective Morgan
- William L. Johnson as Ray
- Daya Vaidya as Sandra
- Bone Crusher as Hill
