= Craig Ross Jr. =

American film director

- Born: Craig Valentine Ross, Jr. Boston, Massachusetts, U.S.
- Occupations: Film, television director, editor, producer and screenwriter
- Years active: 1998–present
- Spouse: Caryn Ward (m. 2011)

Craig Valentine Ross, Jr. is an American film/television director, editor, producer and screenwriter.

== Career ==
Ross was born in Boston, Massachusetts. He then moved with his father to the San Francisco Bay area at an early age. After graduating high school, he went back to the east coast to attend film school at New York University. After graduating he moved back to Los Angeles where he formed his own production company Asiatic Associates (ASA). From there he went on to direct a number independent films, his first being the film Cappuccino (1998). His other film credits include Blue Hill Avenue (2001), Ride or Die (2003), Motives (2004) and The Mannsfield 12 (2007), the first film that was released through MySpace.com.

Since 2004, he has also had a career in television directing episodes of Strong Medicine, Cold Case, Standoff, Crossing Jordan, The 4400, Lincoln Heights, K-Ville, Prison Break, Bones, Numb3rs and NCIS.
