= Ozioma =

- Gender: Female
- Language: Igbo

Origin
- Origin: Nigeria
- Meaning: Good news
- Region of origin: Southeast Nigeria

Ozioma is a female given name of Igbo origin meaning “good news”. In turn, it is also the Igbo word for the gospel, which shares the same etymology.

== Notable people with the name ==
- Ozioma Akagha, American actress
- Ozioma Bennett Ebonine (born 1985), Nigerian politician
