= Hear No Evil (2014 film) =

- Film poster
- Directed by: Russ Parr
- Written by: Russ Parr
- Produced by: David Eubanks; Keith Neal; Eric Tomosunas
- Starring: Richard T. Jones; Jill Marie Jones; Jackie Long; Jahnee Wallace
- Cinematography: Jeff Bollman
- Edited by: Dante Wyatt
- Music by: Kenneth Lampl; Darren Tate
- Production companies: Swirl Films; UpToParr Productions LLC
- Distributed by: TV One
- Release date: June 21, 2014
- Running time: 90 minutes
- Country: United States
- Language: English

Hear No Evil is a 2014 American thriller drama film written and directed by Russ Parr and starring Richard T. Jones, Jill Marie Jones, Jackie Long and Jahnee Wallace.

== Plot ==
Shelby Carson is a deaf high school student. One day while playing lacrosse at school, Shelby is struck by lightning. That night, Shelby's little sister tells their mother that Shelby is behaving strangely. The whole family then comes into Shelby's room, where they learn that Shelby can hear and speak clearly. Sam, Shelby's father, asks Shelby who she is talking to, but before she can answer, Shelby's uncle, Jason, says "God," and Shelby confirms. She then tells her uncle to stop drinking and states that the sharp pains in his side are the beginning of cirrhosis of the liver.

The next day, they take Shelby to the hospital to be examined. The doctor confirms that Shelby's hearing appears to be restored, but the medical cause is a mystery. While there, Shelby observes a nurse inform a man that he has acid reflux, which prompts Shelby to tell the man's wife that he actually has a clogged artery. The man and his wife bring up this suspicion to the doctors while Shelby is being examined, and the couple later tells Shelby and her family that the doctors believe she was likely correct. Shelby's mother expresses concern about Shelby's newfound habit of revealing information she should not be able to know. Despite her mother's hesitance, Shelby continues to make comments about the lives of others that are later proven true, and she gains significant media attention. Reporters and believers begin camping outside her house, causing her family distress.

Meanwhile, Shelby's father, a lawyer, is working on a defense for a man whose family believes has been wrongly imprisoned for over a decade. Shelby's uncle has failed to visit this man, who was his close friend in high school, during this time, which Shelby's tutor chastises him for. Like Jason, Shelby's tutor was close to the accused man in high school. She now visits him regularly in prison, and she confronts Shelby's father about his perceived failure to live up to his promise of proving the man's innocence.

Shelby continues to seemingly divine information about those around her, which causes turmoil within her family. While alone with her mother, Shelby reveals that she is not her mother's first child—she has an older brother. Her mother is distressed by this revelation and refuses to engage with Shelby. Shelby also reveals that her uncle has been evicted, which explains his prolonged presence in their home. Following these revelations, Jason is permitted to remain in their house and Shelby's mother eventually confesses to her husband and daughter that she had a son when she was 15 who was given up for adoption.

In another significant revelation, Shelby tells her father that the evidence he believes to be missing that would exonerate his client has simply been misfiled. Based on this information, her father is able to locate the evidence and prove his client's innocence. Shelby's tutor, rather than being pleased, appears distressed. Her personality shifts, and she confronts Shelby, interrogating her about how much she knows. Convinced that Shelby is aware of her role in the murder that saw her friend imprisoned, the tutor persuades Shelby to go on a ride with her and takes her to the scene of the original murder. There, she explains that she was in love with the man she put in prison and viewed the girl she killed as the lone obstacle preventing him from choosing to be with her. Shelby states that the man never viewed her romantically, which sends her tutor into a frenzy. She attacks Shelby, knocking her unconscious. At this point, Jason rushes in, having been alerted to the suspicious situation by Shelby's fellow deaf friend, who she had drifted away from after regaining her hearing. Jason, too, is knocked unconscious by Shelby's tutor, who then leaves the building. However, when she steps outside, she finds that she is surrounded by police vehicles.

With Shelby's tutor arrested, Shelby and Jason are able to safely recover from their injuries. All appears well until, riding with her parents and sister, Shelby experiences pain and becomes disoriented. She finds that she is, once again, deaf. After exiting the vehicle, she expresses to her family that she is not disappointed to no longer be able to hear, as God's voice will always be with her internally. However, she is grateful that she now knows the voices of her family members. She and her parents then embrace, and her life continues.

== Cast ==
- Jahnee Wallace as Shelby
- Jill Marie Jones as Kate
- Richard T. Jones as Samuel
- Jackie Long as Jason
- Leander Suleiman as Jennifer
- Kaia Davis as Brie
