= Jill Marie Jones =

American actress

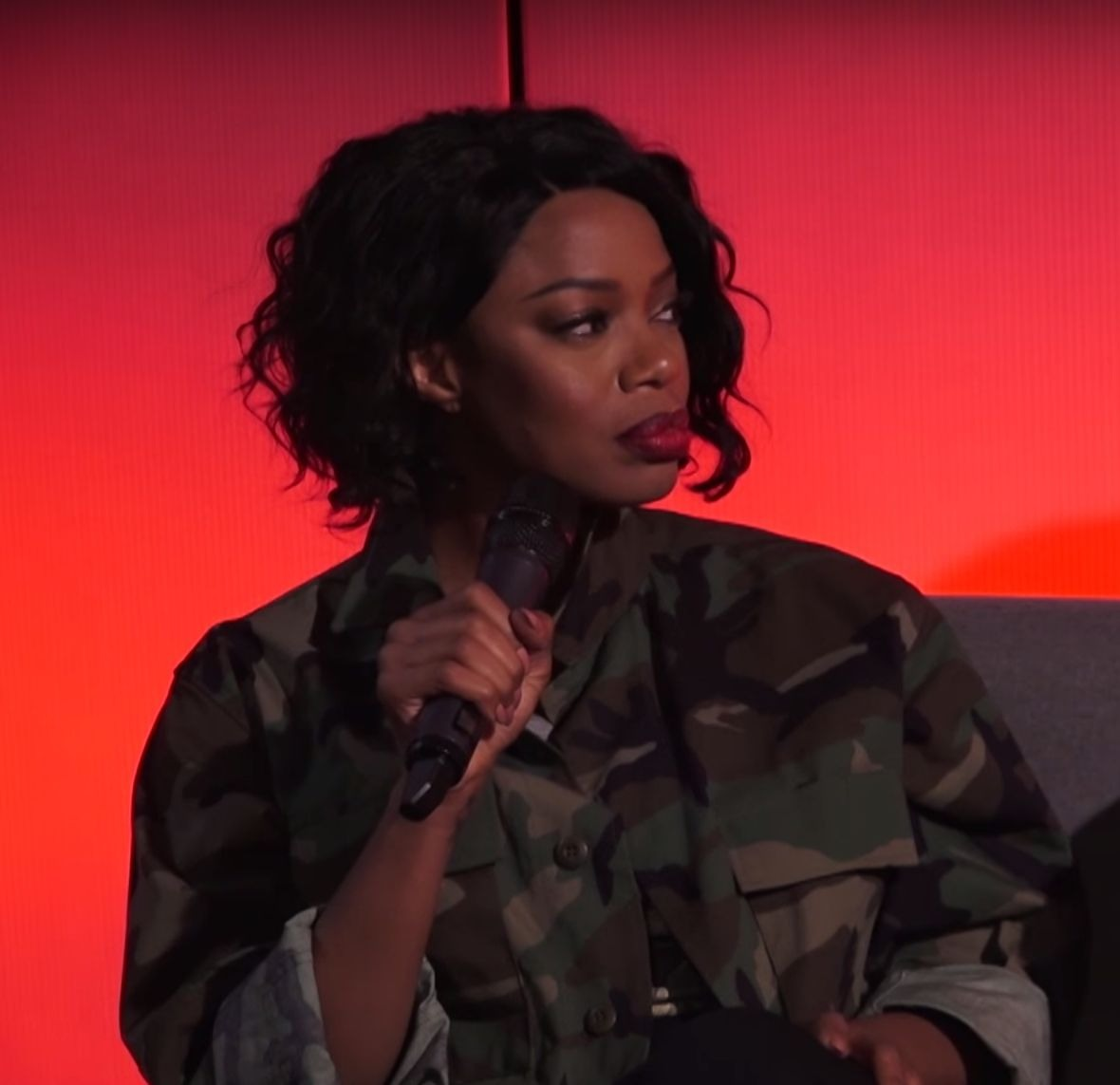
- Jones in 2018
- Born: January 4, 1975 (age 51); Dallas, Texas, U.S.
- Occupations: Actress, dancer
- Years active: 1993–present

Jill Marie Jones (born 1975) is an American actress known for her role as Antoinette "Toni" Childs-Garrett on the UPN comedy series, Girlfriends (2000–2006). Jones has appeared in a number of films, and had the recurring role as Cynthia Irving on the Fox supernatural series, Sleepy Hollow (2013–15). From 2015 to 2016, she starred as Amanda Fisher in the Starz horror-comedy series, Ash vs Evil Dead.

== Early life ==
Jones was born on January 4, 1975 and both born and raised in Dallas, Texas. She graduated from Duncanville High School, where she was on the drill team, in 1992. Jones attended the Texas Woman's University. Before her acting career, she worked as a Dallas Mavericks dancer for one year, and a Dallas Cowboys cheerleader from 1993 to 1995. As one of five Black Dallas Cowboys cheerleaders on the team at the time, she formed a strong bond with her teammates which she has described as a "sisterhood". She also toured with the USO and Department of Defense to Korea, Japan, Israel, and Egypt. While working as a model with the Campbell Agency in Dallas, Jones relocated to Los Angeles and enrolled in acting classes, studying under acting coach, John Kirby. Jones has cited Susan Lucci's portrayal of Erica Kane on All My Children as an early influence for her interest in acting.

== Career ==
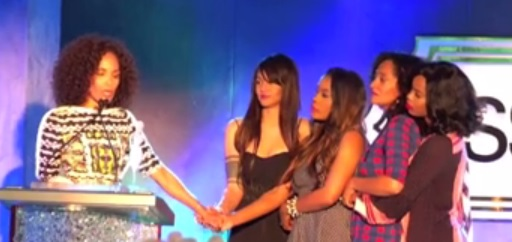
Jones with Girlfriends creator (Mara Brock Akil, far left) and co-stars (left to right: Persia White, Golden Brooks, Tracee Ellis Ross, Jones) in 2013.

Jones made her screen debut in 2000, on the Saturday morning series City Guys. Later that year, she won the co-leading role alongside Tracee Ellis Ross, Golden Brooks and Persia White on the UPN comedy series, Girlfriends which was created by Mara Brock Akil. She played the role of self-centered and materialistic Toni Childs for six seasons of the series. In May 2006, it was confirmed that Jones left Girlfriends because her contract ended. When asked in a 2007 interview whether she felt the character of Toni Childs had run its course, Jones responded: "No, I think if Toni came back and when I say no, I say it because there are brilliant writers on ‘Girlfriends’. There is so much more that you can do. For me and my career, my contract was up after six seasons and there's a whole film world that I wanted to experience and that's what I’ve been doing. I think if Toni came back to the show, there would be so much more to write and much more to bring. That's a testament to how great Mara and the rest of the writers are".

After leaving Girlfriends, Jones began starring in films. She had the female leading roles in comedy films Universal Remote and Redrum (both 2007), and appeared in The Perfect Holiday, opposite Queen Latifah and Terrence Howard as well as Morris Chestnut, Rachel True, and Gabrielle Union. In August 2007, Jones filmed Major Movie Star with Jessica Simpson. In September 2008, she appeared in the Ne-Yo video for "She Got Her Own" which is a remix to his hit single "Miss Independent". She next appeared in the 2010 music video "Got Your Back" starring T.I. ft. Keri Hilson. Jones also co-starred alongside Laura Harring in the 2009 independent film Drool.

In 2010, Jones was cast in the leading role in the TBS micro-series, Gillian in Georgia. In 2013, she appeared on the second season of FX series, American Horror Story in the episode "Spilt Milk" as a call girl named Pandora. Later that year, Jones was cast in the recurring role as Cynthia Irving in the Fox supernatural drama series, Sleepy Hollow. In February 2015, Starz announced that Jones was cast in a leading role as Michigan State Trooper Amanda Fisher in the comedy horror series Ash vs Evil Dead. In 2018, Jones began starring and producing the Urban Movie Channel drama series Monogamy. In 2019, she reunited with her Girlfriends co-stars Tracee Ellis Ross, Golden Brooks and Persia White in an episode of Ross's ABC comedy series Black-ish.

In 2021, Jones was cast in the Oprah Winfrey Network legal drama series Delilah created by Craig Wright. The show was canceled after single season. She had a supporting role in the period romantic drama film Charming the Hearts of Men later that year. In 2023, she got a recurring role in the Showtime drama series, The Chi.

== Filmography ==
=== Film ===
Year	Title	Role	Notes
2007	Redrum	Tonya	
2007	Universal Remote	Mary Sciary	
2007	The Perfect Holiday	Robin	
2008	Major Movie Star	Private Connie Johnson	Also known as Private Valentine: Blonde & Dangerous
2008	The Longshots	Ronnie Macer	
2009	Drool	Imogene Cochran	
2010	Meeting Spencer	Nikki Ross	
2011	35 and Ticking	Coco	
2014	Men, Money & Gold Diggers	Dedra	Direct-to-video
2014	Hear No Evil	Kate	
2018	Boo!	Elyse	
2021	Charming the Hearts of Men	Viola	

=== Television ===
Year	Title	Role	Notes
2000	City Guys	Cheerleader Captain	Episode: "Shock Treatment"
2000–2006	Girlfriends	Antoinette 'Toni' Marie Childs Garrett	137 Episodes; Nominated—BET Comedy Award for Outstanding Supporting Actress in a Comedy Series; Nominated—NAACP Image Award for Outstanding Supporting Actress in a Comedy Series
2010	Gillian in Georgia	Gillian	10 episodes
2012	American Horror Story: Asylum	Pandora	Episode: "Spilt Milk"
2013–2015	Sleepy Hollow	Cynthia Irving	6 episodes
2015–2016	Ash vs Evil Dead	Amanda Fisher	10 episodes
2018–2021	Monogamy	Maggie	Series regular, also Executive producer
2019	Black-ish	Tina	Episode: "Feminisn't"
2021	Delilah	Tamara Roberts	Series regular, 8 episodes
2023	The Neighborhood	Zenay	Episode: "Welcome to the New Do"
2023–2025	The Chi	Bianca	Recurring role
