= It's My Turn =

It's My Turn may refer to:

- It's My Turn (1980 film)
- "It's My Turn" (song), title song from the film performed by Diana Ross
- "It's My Turn", a 2000 song by Angelic
