= Darren Tate =

- Also known as: Angelic, DT8 Project, Jurgen Vries, JODA, 8 Ball, Funkysober, Fish from Japan, Orion, Citizen Caned
- Born: Darren Tate; 22 October 1972 (age 53); London, England
- Genres: Trance
- Occupation: Producer
- Years active: 2000–present
- Label: Mondo Records
- Website: Official site

Darren Tate (born 22 October 1972, in London) is a British record producer, film composer, and club DJ.

== Biography ==
Tate has worked with international musicians and songwriters with whom he collaborates. He has also worked in television, film, and musical theatre. In a DMC magazine interview of March 2007, Tate stated that his favourite record was "Unfinished Sympathy" by Massive Attack.

== Career ==
Like many of his fellow DJs, Tate has used a large number of pseudonyms. His first project was a joint effort with Judge Jules in 2000. Together with Jules's wife, Amanda O'Riordan, they named themselves Angelic.

Later the same year, he cut a few tracks under the name Orion. September 2002 saw the return of Tate under the name Jurgen Vries. Since then, he has used the name DT8 and most recently was part of DT8 Project. His most successful track in terms of chart presence came with "The Opera Song", which featured Charlotte Church, credited on the sleeve as CMC. Tate's first album (released under his own name) was issued in 2006 and titled Horizons 01.

Tate is also known as a DJ. He hosts the monthly 'Mondo Sessions' (with co-host Dale Corderoy) which is syndicated across an international radio station network. In addition, he has performed mixing duties on albums such as Beyond Euphoria (MOS), Trance Republic (with John Askew and Agnelli & Nelson) and Mondo Sessions 001 with Mike Koglin. Tate has also recorded under the name Citizen Caned and now heads Mondo Records, a company which he started.

In addition, Tate announced the launch of a collaborative film scoring project entitled Brainstorm with American composer Kenneth Lampl. The first film they completed together was called Sid's Paralysis by director Babar Ahmed, which went on to win a prize for musical excellence by the Park City Film Music Festival.

In 2012, Tate with Kenneth Lampl scored the motion picture The Undershepherd, directed by Russ Parr and starring Isaiah Washington, Keith David and Louis Gossett Jr. In addition, Tate and Lampl worked together on the feature film How Do You Write a Joe Schermann Song (director Gary King) which won best film and up and coming director at the Phoenix Film Festival and best picture at the Raindance Film Festival amongst other awards.

In 2013, it was announced that the duo would be scoring the feature film Frontera with Kenneth Lampl starring Ed Harris, Eva Longoria, and Michael Pena (dir. Michael Berry).

In 2018, Tate co-produced and orchestrated the first album for The House and Garage Orchestra, Garage Classics. On Record Day 2021, Fat Possum Records released a limited edition album, Give Me More Love by Al Green which was co-produced by Tate. The album took the original recordings from Green which were originally released by Hi Records and incorporates new orchestral arrangements by Tate.

== Discography ==
=== Charted singles (as producer) ===
- June 2000: "It's My Turn" – No. 11 UK (Angelic)
- October 2000: "Eternity" – No. 38 UK (Orion)
- February 2001: "Can't Keep Me Silent" – No. 12 UK (Angelic)
- April 2001: "The Journey" – No. 41 UK (Citizen Caned)
- November 2001: "Stay with Me" – No. 36 UK (Angelic)
- September 2002: "The Theme" – No. 13 UK (Jurgen Vries)
- February 2003: "The Opera Song" – No. 3 UK (Jurgen Vries feat. CMC)
- May 2003: "Destination" – No. 23 UK (DT8 feat. Roxanne Wilde)
- October 2003: "Wilderness" – No. 20 UK (Jurgen Vries feat. Shena)
- June 2004: "Take My Hand" – No. 23 UK (Jurgen Vries feat. Andrea Britton) – cover of Dido's track of the same name
- August 2004: "The Sun Is Shining (Down on Me)" – No. 17 UK (DT8 Project feat. Rob Li)
- March 2005: "Winter" – No. 35 UK (DT8 Project feat. Andrea Britton)
- August 2008: "I Surrender" – No. 4 Flemish Ultratip chart, No. 21 Wallonia Ultratip chart, No. 12 Dutch chart (co-written with Victoria Horn and performed by Kate Ryan)

=== Other releases ===
- 2002: "Let the Light Shine In" (Darren Tate & Jono Grant)
- 2003: "See Me Here" (Orion with uncredited vocals by Rebecca Raines)
- 2003: "Nocturnal Creatures" (Darren Tate & Jono Grant)
- 2003: "Prayer for a God" (Darren Tate)
- 2004: "No Other Love" – No. 84 UK (Darren Tate vs Blue Amazon)
- 2005: "Venus" (Darren Tate)
- 2006: Horizons 01 (Darren Tate) – Tate's first album
- 2006: "Narama" (DT8 Project feat. Mory Kante)
- 2007: "Hold Me Till the End" (DT8 Project feat. Alexta)
- 2007: "Echoes / Chori Chori" (Darren Tate)
- 2008: "Perfect World" (DT8 Project feat. Maria Willson) and Perfect World album
- 2018: Leave It All Behind Vol. 1 EP (DT8 Project)
- 2018: "Timeless" (Darren Tate)
- 2018: Garage Classics (The House and Garage Orchestra) (as producer/arranger/orchestrator)
- 2019: "Cycles" (DT8 Project)
- 2019: Leave It All Behind Vol. 2 EP (DT8 Project)
- 2019: Leave It All Behind Vol. 3 EP (DT8 Project)
- 2019: "Carry On/We Are Oxygen" (DT8 Project)
- 2020: Where We Go From Here Pt. 1 EP (DT8 Project)
- 2022: JODA (JODA) – debut album with Jono Grant (DJ) from Above and Beyond (band)
- 2024: Metamorphosis (Darren Tate) - Tate's debut album on Anjunabeats

== Filmography ==
=== Film credits ===
- The Last Glaciers (with Above and Beyond (band)) (2021)
- Little Horror Movie (2019)
- Among Us (2017)
- Bwoy (2016)
- Definitely Divorcing (2015)
- Frontera (2014)
- Hear No Evil (2014)
- The Fright Night Files (TV film) (2014)
- Unnerved (2014)
- A Christmas Blessing (2014)
- Awakened (2014)
- Snapshot (2014)
- Scavenger Killers (2014)
- The Undershepherd (2013)
- How Do You Write a Joe Schermann Song (sound mixing) (2013)

==== Short films ====
- Less Heat in Arizona (2018)
- The Prison Web (2015)
- Enhanced (2015)
- The Boy Next Door (2014)
- Princess & Grace (2014)

=== Television ===
- Compromised (Pilot) (2014)
