= The Undershepherd =

- Film poster
- Directed by: Russ Parr
- Written by: Russ Parr
- Produced by: Scott Aronson; David Eubanks; Eric Tomosunas
- Starring: Isaiah Washington
- Cinematography: Jeff Bollman
- Edited by: Dante Wyatt
- Music by: Kenneth Lampl; Darren Tate
- Release date: 2012
- Running time: 110 minutes
- Country: United States
- Language: English

The Undershepherd is a 2012 American drama film written and directed by Russ Parr and starring Isaiah Washington.

Two preacher friends clash as one is led by God and the other is led by Satan.

== Cast ==
- Isaiah Washington as L.C.
- Bill Cobbs as Dr. Ezekiel Cannon
- Lamman Rucker as Roland
- Robinne Lee as Shirley
- Malinda Williams as Casandra
- Keith David as Brother Wilks
- Elise Neal as Sister Roberts
- Louis Gossett Jr. as Bishop Redford

== Accolades ==
The film won accolades for Best Narrative Feature, Best Director (Parr) and Best Performance by an Actor (Williams) at the 16th American Black Film Festival.
