= Judge Jules =

Judge Jules MBE
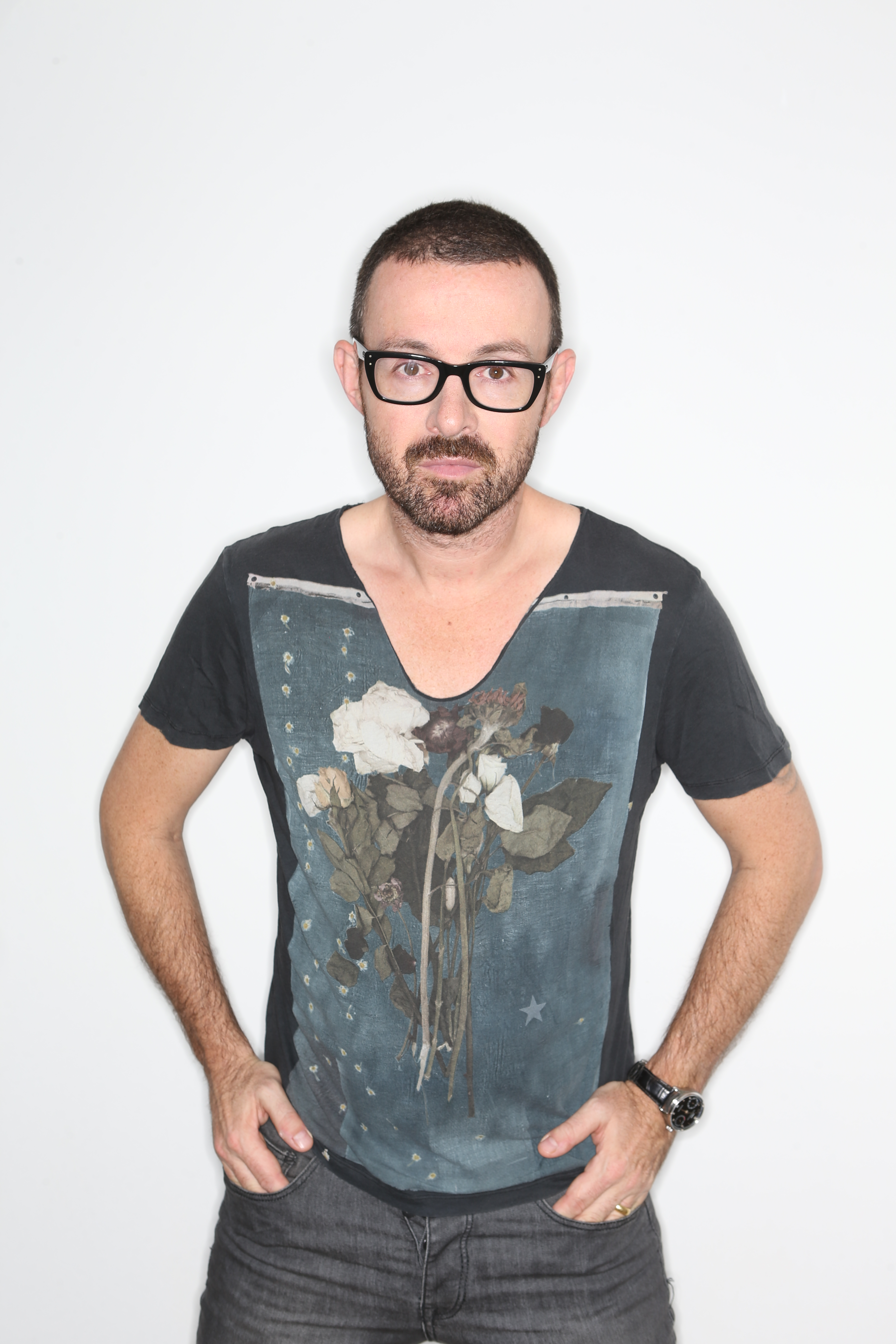
- Julius O'Riordan in 2015

Background information
- Born: Julius O'Riordan; 26 October 1965 (age 60)
- Origin: London, England
- Genres: Trance, house
- Occupations: Club DJ, radio DJ, entertainment lawyer, record producer
- Website: JudgeJules.net

Julius O'Riordan (born 26 October 1965), better known by his stage name Judge Jules, is a British dance music DJ, record producer and entertainment lawyer. He is known for his DJ activities, music production and long-running radio show which achieved global success. He was voted best DJ in the world by DJ Mag in 1995.

== Education ==
O'Riordan was educated at Highgate Wood Secondary School, a state school in Highgate Wood in North London and at University College School, an independent school for boys in Hampstead (also in North London), followed by the London School of Economics (LSE), where he earned a degree in law. During his time at university, O'Riordan started hosting small parties where he was the DJ and earned the nickname "Judge Jules" due to his field of study.

== DJ career and radio shows ==
O'Riordan became a professional DJ in 1987. As a young DJ he became known for his interpretation of beat at the Club Valentino venue in Colchester, Essex, drawing capacity attendance. He was quickly hired by the then-pirate radio station Kiss.

He began his show with Radio 1 in October 1997. When he first arrived, the show went out between 17:00 and 19:00 on Saturday evenings, ahead of Danny Rampling's show. From 31 July 2004, after the departure of Seb Fontaine from the station, his show was moved to 19:00 – 21:00 on Saturday nights, ahead of Tim Westwood. The show was advertised as "The UK's Saturday Warmup", or "The Weekend Warm-Up". The show kept this slot until September 2007.

During those years, his music policy ranged from playing commercial to underground tracks, and much in between. The first segment of the show was taken by the Cut-Up Boys, who did a five or ten-minute mix featuring several dance tracks and a cappella tracks playing simultaneously. The rest of the first hour was generally taken up by house music and the second hour featured trance music, although if they were broadcasting the show outside the studio, the music might vary.

In September 2007, the show was moved to 01:00 – 03:00 on Saturday mornings. Because of his DJ commitments on Friday evenings, it was now pre-recorded instead of being broadcast live. From September 2008, the show was moved forward to 23:00 – 01:00 on Friday evening. The reason for the move was the departure of Dave Pearce, whose Dance Anthems show was moved to BBC Radio 6 Music. His show attracted a wide audience from around the world due to Radio 1's online presence and the Sirius Satellite Radio network in the United States and Canada. Through the radio show, he was responsible for launching many popular trance tunes and acts in the UK, and was a pioneer for commercial contemporary dance music. Many people send their unreleased tracks to him: according to his own website, during the time when his show was being produced, he received between 250 and 300 promos per week. His Radio 1 show was produced by independent production company Somethin' Else.

O'Riordan was also a substitute presenter for the long-running Radio 1 weekend show The Essential Mix, which included hosting the Benga mix in 2008. He presented his last show on Radio 1 on 30 March 2012.

He also has an internationally syndicated radio show called "The Global Warm Up" (also produced by Somethin' Else) which can be heard across the US, Russia, Europe (including RTÉ 2fm) and the Middle East or via podcast. As of May 2019, there have been 792 episodes of the Global Warm Up.

Alongside his full-time job as an entertainment lawyer, in 2019, O'Riordan still tours frequently as a DJ and continues to play at notable venues such as Zero Gravity Dubai and Ministry of Sound, and at events such as Luminosity Beach Festival, Creamfields and Dreamstate USA.

== Judge Jules: Live ==
In March 2019, O'Riordan announced his 'Judge Jules: Live' project which features O'Riordan playing dance classics alongside a 10-piece jazz band and two vocalists. The show debuted at The Plug in Sheffield on Saturday 22 March, with four further dates announced in London, Manchester, Birmingham and Bristol. The live project differs heavily from other comparable shows because the tracks are all re-written for the band to play from the ground up in a different style, specifically for this show.

The live show is billed as a 90-minute performance featuring the full ten-piece Judge Jules Live Band, with a partial DJ set from Jules himself.

== Journalism ==
O'Riordan was a contributor to the UK-based black music magazine Soul Underground between 1988 and 1990. He contributed both as 'Judge Jules' and as 'The Dark Knight', using the anonymity of this identity to provide inside information on the music scene.

== Legal work ==
O'Riordan was an Associate in the Music Group at the law firm Sheridans from 2012 to 2018. In March 2018, he joined Sound Advice LLP as an entertainment lawyer. Jules' legal expertise centres around the entertainment areas in which he has over 30 years' experience.

In 2015, O'Riordan wrote a series of six articles for the 'Industry Insider' section of Mixmag which outlined basic legal advice for a number of music industry topics, including management, publishing and recording contracts.

== Judgement Ibiza ==
O'Riordan had a regular club night in Ibiza that started out as Judgement Sundays at Eden night club; in 2013 this became Judgement Fridays. In 2014, Eden nightclub was rebranded "Gatecrasher" and Judgement Fridays moved over the road to Es Paradis and combined with the Fiesta del Agua (water party). In 2015, the "Gatecrasher" brand had disappeared from Eden and the nightclub was re-launched with a new logo; this also saw the return of O'Riordan's night, now branded "Judgement". Previously advertised as "San Antonio's busiest night" it was later advertised as "San Antonio's most legendary night". The night ran for most of the summer season, generally starting in June and running through mid September, and as well as DJing at this night he also promoted it.

In 2016, Judgement returned to Eden for its 16th season, taking place every Friday from June to September. In 2017, Judgement took a break from Ibiza, but O'Riordan still played at various events including Acid 88/89 at Sankeys Ibiza. Judgement returned to Ibiza in September 2018 for a one-off reunion show at Eden featuring Marco V alongside O'Riordan. In 2019 O'Riordan returned once again to Judgement for a one-off workers' reunion in October also at Eden, alongside Dermot C, Dirty Rotten DJs and Tristan Ingram and Vicky Devine.

== Recorded works ==
O'Riordan's wife provided vocals for the group Angelic, consisting of O'Riordan and Darren Tate, which had two hits, "It's My Turn" in 2000 and "Can't Keep Me Silent" in 2001. In 2005, she appeared on the track "Without Love", which was by O'Riordan himself. This track was eventually released, with remixes, on the Maelstrom Records label in 2007. O'Riordan has also released two albums via this label, "Proven Worldwide" in 2006 and "Bring The Noise" in 2009. In 2012, O'Riordan signed with Paul Van Dyk's label VANDIT Records, releasing "The Attack" and "Give Me A Reason". Elsewhere, he has collaborated several times with Paul Masterson under the Hi-Gate name.

In 2016, O'Riordan launched his record label, Judgement Recordings. The label serves as an outlet for his own original productions, as well as a platform for O'Riordan to push new and upcoming talent. The first release was 'Burn in the Sun' with Richard Bedford in June 2016. In December 2016, the label released a remixed edition of Hi-Gate's 'Caned & Unable' and 'I Can Hear Voices'.

In August 2017, O'Riordan released an original Loopmasters sample pack called "Judge Jules – Essential Big Room House".

== Involvement in 'Classical Dance' events ==
O'Riordan has been heavily involved in at least ten of the popular "classical" dance events, involving orchestras playing dance music. In March 2017, he helped curate the Club Class Classical show. In June 2017, he played at the Cream Classical show. He played at the Colours Classical events in September 2017 and March 2018. He played the Gatecrasher Classical events in October 2017, June 2018, August 2018 and February 2019. In January 2019, he played at and helped curate the Ministry of Sound Classical event.

== TV appearances ==
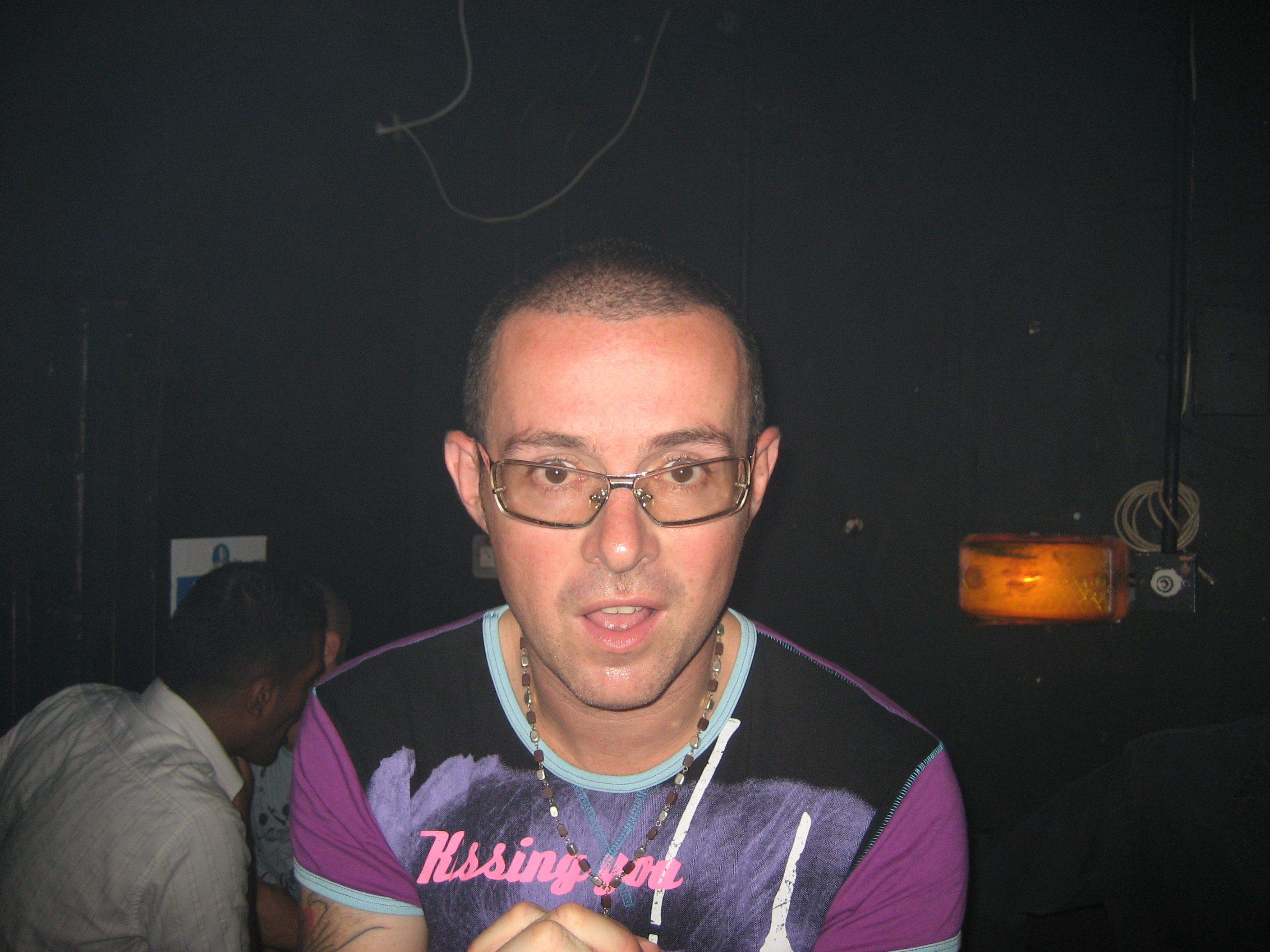
Judge Jules at 'The Gallery', Turnmills in 2006

O'Riordan appeared on the Richard & Judy chat show in 2003 with his counterpart Paul Masterson and singer/DJ Boy George, promoting their Hi-Gate album, on which Boy George made a cameo singing contribution.

O'Riordan appeared on the BBC's Top of the Pops show (2000) with Masterson, to perform the single "Pitchin'", from their album Hi-Gate. O'Riordan also appeared in a UK series called Superstar DJs, and a series called Ibiza Uncovered. He had his own short series Spin Cities on Play UK.

O'Riordan appeared on Channel Five's Fifth Gear in 2005 and 2009. In 2005 he was filmed while at the Global Gathering dance music festival where he was interviewed in a Bentley, and again by the same presenter in 2009 whilst being chauffeured in an Aston Martin to a gig in Bournemouth. He also appeared on Channel Five's The Gadget Show, reviewing DJ equipment including a remote handheld DJing device known as a "pacemaker".

In 2019 he appeared in Series 4 of the BBC's Celebrity MasterChef competition. He exited at the fourth round of the show.

== Charity work ==
In 2009 O'Riordan started supporting the UK charity Breakthrough Breast Cancer, joining the Breakthrough Running Club as the club DJ. In 2022, O'Riordan played a show at The Pioneer Club in St Albans in aid of Herts Young Homeless.

== Clothing range ==
In 2008 O'Riordan worked with designers to produce his own clothing range 'Heroes and Villains'.

== Production aliases ==
- 290 North
- Angelic
- Celine Diablo
- The Clergy
- Dattman
- Hi-Gate
- J&T Project
- Precocious Brats
- Restless Rockers
- Stix 'N' Stoned
- VPL
- Working Class magenta
- JJ
- Megadrone
- Yomanda

== Discography ==
=== Albums ===
- 2006 Proven Worldwide
- 2009 Bring the Noise

=== Compilation albums ===
- 1990 The 1990 MixMag /Kiss FM Mastermixes Track 1
- 1993 Journeys By DJ Volume 2: In The Mix With Judge Jules
- 1995 Essential Mix 3 Disc 2
- 1995 A Retrospective of House 91'-95' Volume 1 Disc 2
- 1995 A Retrospective of House 91'-95' Volume 2 Disc 1
- 1995 Havin' It Dancefloor Classics Volume One
- 1995 The Sperm Bank
- 1995 Journeys By DJ Dance Wars Disc 1
- 1996 Manifesto Records Monster Mix (With Luke Neville)
- 1997 Ministry of Sound Classics
- 1997 Ministry of Sound Dance Nation 3 Disc 2
- 1997 Ministry Magazine Presents Hooj Choons
- 1998 Ministry of Sound Clubbers Guide To. .. Ibiza Disc 2
- 1998 Ministry of Sound The Ibiza Annual Disc 1
- 1998 Ministry Magazine Presents The Annual IV – Six Track Sampler
- 1998 Ministry of Sound The Annual IV Disc 1
- 1999 Ministry of Sound Clubber's Guide To. .. Ninety Nine
- 1999 Ministry of Sound Clubber's Guide To. .. Ibiza – Summer Ninety Nine
- 1999 Ministry of Sound The Ibiza Annual – Summer Ninety Nine Disc 1
- 1999 Ministry of Sound The Annual – Millennium Edition Disc 1
- 2000 Ministry of Sound Clubber's Guide To. .. 2000
- 2000 Ministry of Sound The Annual 2000 Disc 1
- 2000 Ministry of Sound Clubber's Guide To. .. Ibiza – Summer 2000
- 2000 Ministry Magazine Presents Superstar DJs Judge Jules
- 2000 Ministry of Sound The Ibiza Annual – Summer 2000 Disc 1
- 2001 Clubbed
- 2002 Clubbed 2002
- 2002 Judge Jules Presents Tried & Tested
- 2003 Judgement Sundays – Ibiza 2003
- 2003 Ministry of Sound Trance Nation Anthems
- 2003 Ministry of Sound Trance Nation Harder
- 2004 Judgement Sundays 2004
- 2004 Ministry of Sound Trance Nation Electric
- 2004 The Very Best of Tried & Tested Euphoria
- 2005 Judgement Euphoria
- 2006 The Global Warm Up Mix CD
- 2006 Ministry of Sound Judgement Sundays – The True Sound of Ibiza
- 2007 Ministry of Sound Judgement Sundays 2007
- 2007 Gatecrasher Immortal (Disc 3)
- 2007 Pacha Sharm, Ministry of Sound featuring Mohamed Ali Hussein aka DJ Moeali
- 2008 Gatecrasher ICE ICE ICE — Mix Album by Judge Jules
- 2008 Ministry of Sound Judgement Sundays – The Mix 2008
- 2009 Gatecrasher's Trance Anthems 1993—2009 (Disc 3)
- 2010 Judgement Sundays Presents Ibiza 2000–2010
- 2013 The Gallery – 18 Years
- 2015 Judge Jules' Trance Anthems
- 2021 Ministry of Sound – 30 Years: Three Decades of Dance

=== Singles ===
- 1991 Judge Jules – My Head Keeps Spinning Round
- 1996 Judge Jules & John Kelly Present Stix 'N' Stoned – Outrageous – Positiva
- 1996 Judge Jules – Outrageous
- 1998 Sonique – I Put A Spell on You (Judge Jules Club Dub)
- 2005 Michael Woods & JJ* feat Marcella Woods – So Special – three8 recordings
- 2005 Flowmasters – Let It Take Control (Judge Jules Remix) – XL recordings
- 2005 Judge Jules & BK – Seizure – Riot! Recordings
- 2005 DuMonde Vs. Judge Jules – What's in Your Head – Fate Recordings
- 2006 Judge Jules & BK – Rumble / I Don't Know – Riot! Recordings
- 2006 Judge Jules – Without Love – Maelstrom Records
- 2006 Judge Jules – Ordinary Day – Maelstrom Records
- 2006 Judge Jules – Three Drives / Judge Jules vs. Michael Woods – Greece 2000 / So Special – SPG Music Productions Ltd.
- 2007 Judge Jules – What's in Ur Head
- 2007 Judge Jules – Laid Bare – Maelstrom Records
- 2007 Judge Jules & BK – Sickness
- 2008 Judge Jules – Judgement Theme – Maelstrom Records
- 2010 Judge Jules – Verano Loco
- 2010 Judge Jules – Hold On
- 2011 Judge Jules – City Nights
- 2011 Judge Jules – The Greater Good
- 2011 Judge Jules – The Attack
- 2012 Judge Jules – Give me a Reason – Vandit
- 2013 Judge Jules – The Verdict
- 2013 Judge Jules – Collide
- 2013 Judge Jules – Phenomenology
- 2014 Judge Jules – Monte Carlo
- 2016 Judge Jules & Richard Bedford – Burn in the Sun – Judgement Recordings
- 2016 Judge Jules – Scream – Judgement Recordings
- 2016 Judge Jules – Eat You Up – 000 Recordings
- 2016 Judge Jules – Turn on the Lights – Coldharbour
- 2017 Judge Jules feat Cynthia Hall – The Twilight – Sirup Recordings
- 2017 Judge Jules – Dimensions – MPS Recordings
- 2017 Judge Jules – Te Quiero – Sirup Recordings
- 2017 Max Freegrant – Sometimes We Need To Forget – Judge Jules Remix – Freegrant Recordings
- 2018 Judge Jules – House of Love – Sirup Recordings
- 2018 Judge Jules – Erotica – MPS / Coldharbour Recordings
- 2018 Judge Jules – Oscuro – Which Bottle Recordings
- 2018 Judge Jules – Never The Same – Moon Recordings
- 2019 Judge Jules – Won't You Listen – Which Bottle
- 2019 Judge Jules – Echoes of Silence – Euphonic Recordings
- 2019 Judge Jules - Used to Think — PinkStar Records
- 2019 Judge Jules - Diamond Mouth — PinkStar Records
- 2019 Judge Jules - Getting Played — M.I.K.E. Push Studio
- 2022 Judge Jules - Deep & Meaningful — Dreamstate Records
- 2024 Judge Jules - I Lost Myself — Dreamstate Records
- 2024 Judge Jules feat. Shayee - Good Space — Gemstone Records
- 2024 Judge Jules - First In Last Out — Gemstone Records
- 2024 Judge Jules feat. EV Palmer - Dance With The Devil — Gemstone Records
- 2025 Woody Van Eyden & Judge Jules - The Fiddle — You Love Dance

== Accolades ==
=== 1995 ===
- Voted the No1 DJ in the World by DJ Magazine in 1995.

=== 1998 ===
- Voted number three in the "Top 150 DJs in the World" by DJ Magazine.

=== 1999 ===
- Voted "Best DJ" at the Muzik Awards.
- Voted number one in the "Mixmag Readers' Poll".
- Won "Best DJ" and "Best Radio DJ" at the Ministry Awards.
- Won "Best International DJ" the "Smirnoff Dance Awards" in Ireland.

=== 2000 ===
- Voted number six in the "Top 100 DJs in the World" by DJ Magazine.
- Won "Best Radio DJ" at the Smirnoff Dance Star Awards.
- Won "Best International DJ" at the BBM Awards.

=== 2001 ===
- For the second year running, won "Best Radio DJ" at the Smirnoff Dance Star Awards.
- For the second year running, won "Best International DJ" at the BBM Awards.
- Won "Best Trance DJ" at the DJ Awards.

=== 2006 ===
- Winner of 'Best Ibiza Trance DJ' Award at the M8 Ibiza Dance Awards on 2 September 2006 in Eden (nightclub), Ibiza

=== DJ Magazine Top 100 DJs ===
Year	Position	Notes	Ref.
1995	1	Elected by the magazine	
1997	4	New Entry	
1998	3	Up 1	
1999	4	Down 1	
2000	6	Down 2	
2001	11	Down 5	
2002	7	Up 4	
2003	9	Down 2	
2004	14	Down 5	
2005	15	Down 1	
2006	16	Down 1	
2007	21	Down 5	
2008	32	Down 11	
2009	44	Down 12	
2010	18	Up 26	
2011	67	Down 49	
2012	132	Exit (Down 65)	

== Personal life ==
He has lived in North London for the majority of his life, now settled in the Hampstead area with his wife Amanda, their son Jake and daughter Phoebe. Jules has a villa in Ibiza and during the summer months he and his family split their time between there and North London. His father, Shaun O'Riordan, starred as Eddie Larkin in the sitcom The Larkins, which aired on British television between 1958 and 1960. Jules is the nephew of celebrity chef Rick Stein. His wife, Amanda, is the cousin of techno DJ Tommy Four Seven.

His net worth was estimated to be US$42 million as of 2023, making him one of the Top 30 highest net worth DJ/producers in the world.

Awards and achievements
Preceded by Aba Shanti-I	DJ Magazine Number 1 DJ; 1995	Succeeded by Carl Cox
