= A Hole in One =

- Directed by: Richard Ledes
- Written by: Richard Ledes
- Starring: Michelle Williams; Meat Loaf Aday
- Release date: 2004
- Running time: 97 minutes
- Country: United States
- Language: English

A Hole in One is a 2004 film co-starring Michelle Williams and Meat Loaf. The film marked the feature debut of writer/director Richard Ledes. It received its premiere at the Tribeca Film Festival in 2003.

== Plot ==
Anna (Michelle Williams) is a young woman in an American suburb in the early 1950s. She is disturbed by her family’s rejection of her brother, a World War II veteran who comes home shell shocked. The impressionable girl is lured into a relationship with Billy, a local mob boss. When Anna’s brother dies and she witnesses Billy murder a local nightclub owner, she is driven to the edge of sanity. She develops a fixation with mental health that drives her to seek out a transorbital lobotomy. Anna learns about the procedure through sensational newspapers and Life magazine, which advertises the operation as the new vogue in American medicine. Also, her small town is buzzing about it when Dr. Harold Ashton, the foremost practitioner of this brand of lobotomy, comes to town. He starts performing the “icepick lobotomy” on alcoholics, veterans, and other troubled outsiders.

Billy is concerned with his girlfriend's obsession. He directs his girlfriend to a fake clinic fronted by Tom, a Korean War veteran on Billy’s payroll who masquerades as a neurologist. Tom convinces Anna to delay the procedure and visit him that night. Tom and Anna share their traumas with one another and grow closer. Billy finds them together and sets off a final conflict that draws the film to a close.

== Development ==
The idea for A Hole in One was born out of a performance piece Ledes had staged at the American Fine Arts Gallery in SoHo in the early 1990s. The performance was based on the records of a WWII veteran who had experienced a psychotic break and for whom it had been recommended that he receive a lobotomy. Ledes conducted extensive research for the film over many years, including volunteering at an outpatient center for severely mentally ill. Additionally, he visited George Washington University, which holds the archives of Dr. Walter Freeman.

Rather than doing a documentary on Freeman or case studies on mental illness, Ledes opted for fiction:

“I never considered doing a documentary. For me it was always important to tell the story in this way. That there were truths about the subject of mental illness and the use of transorbital lobotomy that were inseparable from the truths that one finds in storytelling rather than the true and false of science.”

Ledes’ screenplay draws heavily on documents such as the New York Departmental of Mental Hygiene Annual Report of 1953. In his DVD commentary for A Hole in One, Ledes mentions other insightful sources: Great and Desperate Cures: The Rise and Decline of Psychosurgery and Other Radical Treatments for Mental Illness and Last Resort: Psychosurgery and Other Radical Treatments for Mental Illness by Jack David Pressman. He also cites The Lobotomist: A Maverick Medical Genius and His Tragic Quest to Rid the World of Mental Illness by Jack El-Hai, which came out after A Hole in One, as a reliable reference point.

Ledes has compared the character of Dr. Ashton to Dr. Strangelove. While he isn’t modeled on one historical person, he is derived from real-life figures.

== Reception ==
As of June 2014, the film scores 17% on Rotten Tomatoes from 12 reviews.
