= 35 and Ticking =

35 & Ticking
- Directed by: Russ Parr
- Written by: Russ Parr
- Produced by: Eric Tomosunas; Chris Spencer; Russ Parr; Kym Whitley; Mike Epps
- Starring: Kevin Hart; Meagan Good; Keith Robinson; Wendy Raquel Robinson; Tamala Jones; Nicole Ari Parker
- Cinematography: Jeff Bollman
- Edited by: Dante Wyatt
- Music by: Kenneth Lampl
- Production company: UPTOPARR Productions Swirl Films
- Distributed by: Image Entertainment
- Release date: May 20, 2011
- Country: United States
- Language: English
- Box office: $113,794

35 & Ticking (also known as Russ Parr's 35 & Ticking or 35 and Ticking) is an American romantic comedy film written and directed by Russ Parr.

The film stars a mostly African American ensemble cast featuring Kevin Hart,
Meagan Good, Tamala Jones, Nicole Ari Parker , Kym Whitley, Darius McCrary, Dondre Whitfield, Mike Epps, Luenell, Clifton Powell, Jill Marie Jones, Wendy Raquel Robinson, and Keith Robinson. The film had its limited release in theaters on May 20, 2011.

== Plot ==
Cleavon, Zenobia, Victoria, and Phil are all friends over the age of 35 and struggling to build the families they've always dreamed of. While Cleavon is still looking for the woman of his dreams, Victoria is married to a man who doesn't want children, Zenobia meanwhile, is too geeky to get a man, and Phil is already married with children, but his wife is not very interested in being a mother. All four of them try to rectify their romantic lives and futures while their biological clocks tick away.

== Cast ==
- Kevin Hart as Cleavon
- Meagan Good as Falinda
- Tamala Jones as Victoria
- Nicole Ari Parker as Zenobia
- Keith Robinson as Phil
- Jill Marie Jones as Coco
- Kym Whitley as Shavelle
- Luenell as Donya
- Darius McCrary as Nick West
- Dondre Whitfield as Austin
- Mike Epps as Harold
- Wendy Raquel Robinson as Calise
- Clifton Powell as Zane
- Aaron D. Spears as Officer Jones
- Angelique Bates as Gangsta Girl
- Skoti Collins as Officer Bade
