= Tristan Ingram =

Musical artist (born 1980)

- Born: Tristan Ingram; 25 March 1980 (age 46); Gillingham, Kent, England
- Genres: House
- Occupations: Club DJ, Record Producer, Remixer
- Instrument: DJ
- Years active: 2002 – present
- Labels: Toolroom/Leaders of The New School, Vandit, Armada/Pilot6, Snow Dog, Blackhole Recordings, Hook Recordings, Plasmapool, Cayenne, Couture
- Website: tristaningram.com

Tristan Ingram (born 25 March 1980, in Gillingham, Kent, England) is an English House DJ and EDM music producer & remixer from Kent, England.

== Career ==
Tristan is a DJ, producer and remixer his work has been played on mainstream stations such as BBC Radio 1, he has been awarded Judge Jules' 'Tried & Tested' track of the week as well as being featured as a DJ on route and voted the winner of Pete Tong's 'Bedroom Bedlam competition' (leading to it being signed up by Toolroom records) and had the track included on Carl Cox's Space Ibiza 2009 compilation release. He was also awarded mix of the week by Mixmag, as well as being referred to by Mixmag, in summer 2009, as "One to Watch" and was rated by Claudia Cazacu as best breakthrough DJ/producer of 2010.

He mostly works in the UK but during the summer months he can be found DJing in Ibiza. He has close links to DJ Judge Jules and his Judgement Sundays night. He has also played a set at Eden night club in San Antonio where he has held a residency for a number of years. He is also a regular DJ at Random held at HUSH in San Antonio as well as previously playing sets at Ibiza clubs such as: Privilege, Amnesia, Space, El Divino and Sankeys. He has also reported on music events and happenings for Trackitdown website.

In 2019, he released a single with Ali Wilson, Matt Smallwood called "Perfect Sunrise 2019" under the label Toolroom Records.

== Discography ==
=== Singles ===
- Tristan Ingram – Mor
- Andrew Galea & Tristan Ingram – Disco Dance
- 2008 Tristan Ingram & Black Russian – Come and Get it (Fakt)
- 2009 Wilson, Smallwood & Ingram – Perfect Sunrise (Toolroom Records)
- 2010 Wilson, Smallwood & Ingram – Koko – Armada
- 2010 Ali Wilson & Tristan Ingram – African Chant – Blackhole
- 2010 Ali Wilson Matt Smallwood & Tristan Ingram – Miasma (Original Mix) (Pilot 6)
- 2011 Black Russian & Tristan Ingram – Take Note (Fakt) (Tech Trance Mix)
- 2011 Black Russian & Tristan Ingram – Take Note (Fakt) (Original Mix)
- 2011 Tristan Ingram & Grant Nalder – Uppers & Downers (Polarbear Music)
- 2019 Wilson, Smallwood & Ingram – Perfect Sunrise 2019 (Toolroom Records)

=== Remixes ===
- Hannah – When The Sun Goes Down (Ali Wilson & Tristan Ingram remix)
- Ruff Driverz Feat Arrola – Dreaming – (Tristan Ingram, Rob Cockerton & Jason Still mix)
- 2008 Rob Cockerton & Jason Still – Loaded (Tristan Ingram Mix) (White)
- 2008 Degrees in Motion - Shine On (Tristan Ingram & Jason Still Remix) (Cayenne)
- 2008 Patrik Carrera – Drowning (Tristan Ingram & Jason Still 2am Mix) (Couture)
- 2009 La Roux – In for the Kill (Tristan Ingram & Black Russian Festival Edit)
- 2009 Florence & The Machine – Howl (Ali Wilson & Tristan Ingram Club Edit)
- 2010 Mr Sam & Andy Duguid – Satisfaction Guaranteed (BK/Black Russian & Tristan Ingram Remix) (Blackhole Recordings)
- 2010 Hannah – I Believe in You (Ali Wilson & Tristan Ingram Remix)
- 2010 Hannah – Sanity (Ali Wilson & Tristan Ingram Remix)
- 2011 Las Salinas – San Antoni (Ali Wilson & Tristan Ingram Remix) Vandit
- 2011 DJ Fresh – Louder (Andrew Galea & Tristan Ingram NYE Remix)
- 2011 Chase & Status – Time (Tristan Ingram & Andrew Galea Ibiza Remix)
- 2011 X Cabs – Neuro 99 (Black Russian & Tristan Ingram 10 years on Remix) (Hook Records)
- 2014 Lazy Rich – Ghosts – Black Russian & Tristan Ingram Remix (Plasmapool)
