= The Caller (2008 film) =

- Directed by: Richard Ledes
- Written by: Richard Ledes; Alain-Didier Weill
- Produced by: Ged Dickersin
- Starring: Frank Langella; Elliott Gould; Laura Harring
- Cinematography: Stephen Kazmierski
- Edited by: Madeleine Gavin
- Music by: Robert Miller
- Release dates: September 26, 2008 (Festival do Rio); February 13, 2009 (United States)
- Running time: 95 minutes
- Country: United States
- Language: English

The Caller is a 2008 film by Richard Ledes. The film, which stars Frank Langella, Elliott Gould, and Laura Harring, premiered at the Tribeca Film Festival where it won the Made in NY Narrative Award. The screenplay was co-authored with Alain Didier-Weill.

== Plot ==
Jimmy Stevens (Frank Langella) is a high level executive at an international energy consulting firm. Haunted by the criminal practices of his company, he decides to expose their corruption. He realizes this betrayal will lead to his murder, so he hires out a detective to trail him during his last days.

Unaware that the man who has hired him and the man he is following are one and the same, Turlotte (Elliott Gould) begins a thrilling game of cat and mouse with Stevens and New York City becomes the arena for the uncertain contest. Slowly, the investigation begins to yield clues that come to reveal the larger story of Jimmy's mysterious past.

As hints of his childhood in occupied France during World War II are unearthed, a haunting memory surrounding a lone, dying man and the two young boys who witness his last breath becomes the key to the present. As the clock winds down and the hired guns close in on Jimmy, Turlotte puts the puzzle pieces together with just enough time to fulfill his fated duty.

== Cast ==
- Frank Langella as Jimmy Stevens
- Elliott Gould as Frank Turlotte
- Laura Harring as Eileen
- Corey Johnson as Paul Winsail
- Edoardo Ballerini as Teddy
- Helen Stenborg as Jimmy's mother

== Reception ==
As of June 2014, the film had a score of 13% on Rotten Tomatoes from 16 reviews. Time Out New York gave it 2 stars. Screen International called it "ponderous".
