= Delilah (American TV series) =

American television drama series

- Genre: Drama
- Created by: Craig Wright
- Starring: Maahra Hill; Jill Marie Jones; Susan Heyward; Ozioma Akagha; Candace B. Harris; Kelly Jacobs; Braelyn Rankins; Khalil Johnson
- Country of origin: United States
- Original language: English
- No. of seasons: 1
- No. of episodes: 8

Production
- Executive producers: Oprah Winfrey; Craig Wright; Charles Randolph-Wright
- Running time: 40–43 min.
- Production companies: Harpo Films; Warner Bros. Television

Original release
- Network: Oprah Winfrey Network
- Release: March 9 – April 27, 2021

Delilah is an American television drama series, created by Craig Wright, and executive produced by Oprah Winfrey's Harpo Films and Warner Bros. Television. The series premiered on OWN on March 9, 2021 ran for eight episodes until April 27, and was canceled in early 2022.

== Premise ==
The series follows Delilah Connolly (played by Maahra Hill), who left a white-shoe law firm a decade ago and hung up her own shingle so she could make raising her kids her number one priority, and now began taking cases the big firms ignore, going head-to-head with the powerful and privileged as she fights for the disenfranchised.

== Cast and characters ==
=== Main ===
- Maahra Hill as Delilah Connolly, a headstrong, highly principled lawyer in Charlotte, North Carolina
- Jill Marie Jones as Tamara Roberts, Delilah's confidante and best friend
- Susan Heyward as Demetria Barnes, Delilah's newly hired, fearless, and ambitious associate
- Ozioma Akagha as Harper Obioha, Delilah's secretary
- Kelly Jacobs as Maia Leighton, Delilah's teenage daughter
- Braelyn Rankins as Marcus Leighton, Delilah's son
- Khalil Johnson as Dion Connolly, Delilah's nephew

=== Recurring ===
- LaMonica Garrett as Casey, Tamara's love interest who is Deputy Mayor of Charlotte
- Lyriq Bent as Gordon Leighton, Delilah's ex-husband
- Joseph Callender as Andre
- Michel Curiel as Jamal, Casey's single best friend
- Nigel Gibbs as Wes Connolly, Delilah's father and Chief of Police of Charlotte.
- Leonard Harmon as Nate Connolly, Delilah's younger brother
- Candace B. Harris as Christine Connolly, Nate's estranged wife and Dion's mother
- Gray Hawks as Win, Tamara's boss
- Joe Holt as Mace, a private investigator
- Saycon Sengbloh as Leah Davis, Delilah's friend from college
- Amanda Tavarez as Katya, Gordon's girlfriend

== Episodes ==
No.	Title	Directed by	Written by	Original release date	U.S. viewers (millions)
1	"Everything to Everybody"	Cheryl Dunye	Craig Wright	March 9, 2021	0.39
2	"Toldja"	Cheryl Dunye	Wayne Conley	March 9, 2021	0.32
3	"Sometimes Apart"	Charles Randolph-Wright	Erica Michelle Butler	March 16, 2021	0.32
4	"Andre"	Crystle Roberson	Ivy Mariel Pruss & Erica Michelle Butler	March 23, 2021	0.30
5	"No Good Deed"	Ayoka Chenzira	Nick Kilgore & Jordan Crump-King	April 6, 2021	0.33
6	"Bachata!"	Charles Randolph-Wright	Ivy Mariel Pruss & Devan Renea	April 13, 2021	0.32
7	"Purple Empress"	Ayoka Chenzira	Steven Fulcher	April 20, 2021	0.32
8	"The Long Game"	Charles Randolph-Wright	Ivy Mariel Pruss & Devan Renea	April 27, 2021	0.28

== Production ==
=== Development ===
On August 26, 2020, it was announced that OWN had given Delilah a series order and would be produced by the same creative team behind Greenleaf' of Craig Wright, Warner Bros. Television and Oprah Winfrey’s Harpo Films. Charles Randolph-Wright, Craig Wright and Oprah Winfrey will serve as the shows executive producers. Directors for the series include Randolph-Wright, Ayoka Chenzira, Crystle C. Roberson and Cheryl Dunye who will direct the pilot episode.

The series was canceled after one season in early 2022, however it wasn't made public until series star Maahra Hill was cast in the NBC pilot The Irrational in May.

=== Casting ===
On August 26, 2020, Maahra Hill was cast in a title role while Jill Marie Jones, Susan Heyward and Ozioma Akagha were cast as regulars. In January 2021, OWN announced that 14 actors including LaMonica Garrett and Lyriq Bent had joined the series in recurring and regular roles.

== Release ==
On February 3, 2021 OWN released the first trailer for the series.
