= Frontera (2014 film) =

- Theatrical released poster
- Directed by: Michael Berry
- Written by: Michael Berry; Luis Moulinet III
- Produced by: Bill Andrew; Tracy K. Price; Alex Witherill; Mike Witherill; Eric A. Williams; Tina Aldatz; Barry Young
- Starring: Ed Harris; Michael Peña; Eva Longoria; Amy Madigan; Aden Young
- Cinematography: Joel Ransom
- Edited by: Larry Madaras
- Music by: Darren Tate; Kenneth Lampl
- Production company: Ocean Blue Entertainment
- Distributed by: Magnolia Pictures
- Release date: July 31, 2014
- Country: United States
- Languages: English; Spanish
- Budget: $2.3 million
- Box office: $59,306

Frontera is a 2014 American Western drama film directed by Michael Berry. The film spotlights illegal immigration from various perspectives, and stars Ed Harris, Michael Peña, Eva Longoria and Amy Madigan.

== Plot ==
Miguel Ramirez prepares for illegal entry into the U.S. from Mexico. At his father-in-law's request, the clean-cut and resourceful Miguel reluctantly agrees to be accompanied by the slovenly and opportunistic Jose, who ogles Miguel's pregnant wife Paulina. The two men cross the border onto a sprawling Arizona ranch owned by Olivia McNary and her husband Roy, a retired sheriff.

Olivia goes horseback riding and encounters Miguel and Jose. She offers them bottled water, a blanket, and brief conversation before riding away.

In the meantime, teen Sean Hunt is convinced by friends to use his father's rifle and go shooting. Sean is appalled to discover Brad's intention to shoot at the Mexicans Kevin sights with binoculars. Brad intends only to scare their targets, asking to use Sean's superior rifle and its scope, but Sean refuses until realizing that Brad's gun is dangerously less accurate.

Brad fires shots from Sean's rifle near Miguel and Jose, sending them scrambling—and also attracts separate attention from Olivia and Roy. Sean objects that Brad's shots are too close; Brad replies that Sean should show how it's done, and Kevin goads Sean by telling him “You could shoot the tits off a fly.” Olivia just then comes around a curve, Miguel tries to warn her away, and Sean takes a shot at a water jug through the scope. Olivia's horse is spooked and throws her into a pile of rocks.

While Jose runs off, Miguel tries to help an injured but conscious Olivia, who asks him to retrieve her horse. Sean also wants to help her, but is convinced by his friends to abandon her. Roy arrives in time to see Olivia's horse being led by Miguel, who runs away just before Olivia dies in Roy's arms.

Jose befriends two other Mexicans. The three force their way into a house, and rob a family of food, wallet, and a truck at knifepoint. When subsequently arrested, Jose has Olivia's blanket in his possession. When identified by both Jose and Roy from previous deportation arrest photos, Miguel is arrested while doing landscaping work. Miguel phones Paulina to inform her of his arrest.

Paulina decides to go to the U.S. herself, a naïve target for the coyotes, who lead her and a dozen others across the border and into Phoenix, bribing an immigration officer along the way. She is violently beaten and raped by two coyotes, who subsequently strip and hold captive for ransom the entire group.

Sheriff Randall Hunt informs Roy of Miguel's arrest for first-degree murder, but Roy wants further investigation of the rifle shots he heard. Roy briefly gains access to Miguel and learns the truth about his wife's death, which Miguel describes with respect for Olivia and empathy for Roy. Roy searches the shooting scene, retrieving both a bullet and fresh rifle casings. While searching, he witnesses from a distance a Mexican being killed by a sniper, who flees in a green and white 4x4.

Roy gives the evidence to Randall, believing the sniper responsible for Olivia's death. But Randall recognizes the shell casings as ones he reloaded himself, and thus fired from his own rifle. When questioned, Sean, Brad and Kevin offer conflicting accounts (including the defense that they shot at Miguel because he tried to steal Olivia's horse), but Roy is now convinced of Miguel's innocence. The teens are ultimately left facing unspecified charges for their role in Olivia's death, but Roy agrees to speak on Sean's behalf on the condition that he tells the truth at the deposition.

After the Mexican hostages in Phoenix escape, Flora (Randall's employee and a friend of Roy) learns that Paulina is being treated for injuries and trauma. She and Roy quietly transport Paulina first to see Miguel in jail, and then back to her family in Mexico. Roy then gains Miguel's release, and brings him to his ranch. Miguel notices Olivia's horse has a dirty pen and begins shoveling out manure. Roy joins the work, later inviting Miguel to accompany him on a horse ride.

Roy leads Miguel to his property's damaged fence, and offers to hire Miguel to keep it repaired from the Mexico side of the border. Roy rides away and Miguel sets to work—with the sniper soon bringing Miguel into his rifle sights. As the sniper begins to pull the trigger, Roy stands above the sniper and draws his own gun.

== Cast ==
- Ed Harris as Roy McNary
- Michael Peña as Miguel Ramirez
- Eva Longoria as Paulina Ramirez, Miguel's wife
- Amy Madigan as Olivia McNary, Roy's wife
- Aden Young as Sheriff Randall Hunt
- Seth Adkins as Sean Hunt, son of Sheriff Hunt and a Hispanic mother
- Evan Adrian as Brad
- Tony Ford as Kevin
- Michael Ray Escamilla as Jose
- Julio Cedillo as Ramon / Main Coyote
- Daniel Zacapa as Abuelo
- Lora Martinez-Cunningham as Laura Zamora
- Monica Sanchez as Sean's mother

== Reception ==
On the review aggregator website Rotten Tomatoes, 54% of 24 critics' reviews are positive. The website's consensus reads: "Frontera is solidly cast, handsomely mounted, and well-acted; unfortunately, it's also rather dull and fairly forgettable." Metacritic, which uses a weighted average, assigned the film a score of 58 out of 100, based on 13 critics, indicating "mixed or average" reviews.

Christy Lemire of RogerEbert.com gave the film 2.5 out of 5

The Women Film Critics Circle awarded Frontera its 2014 Adrienne Shelly Award, which honors films that "most passionately oppose violence against women."
