= Richard Ledes =

American film director (born 1956)

- Born: November 11, 1956 (age 69); Baltimore, Maryland
- Occupations: Writer, director

Richard Ledes (born November 11, 1956) is an American filmmaker and writer based in New York City, best known for his 2012 feature film drama Fred Won't Move Out about Alzheimer's disease starring Elliott Gould and Fred Melamed.

== Background ==
He studied Ancient Greek, English literature and Theatre at Amherst College, graduating magna cum laude in 1979. He formed a theater group to perform plays in Ancient Greek and created a play from the last book of Iliad that was performed in the original Greek by Ledes at the Edinburgh Festival Fringe in Scotland.

He moved to Paris where he wrote and directed plays such as "Midtown Stabber" and "The Gift of Walking", a seven-minute play accompanied by Prokofiev's "Seventh Sonata" and performed at Atelier Mahdavi on Rue de la Roquette. He also turned his then-apartment at 242 Rue Saint Martin into a theater where the play "Shade" was performed. Shade included a 16 mm sequence of bowling pins that was shot by the French documentary filmmaker Richard Hamon. Ledes subsequently directed and wrote a number of short films, among which, "Animals," a 5-minute 16mm film based on the grandmother's tale in Buchner's play Woyzeck.

During this time he also began to write on art for a number of magazines, notably Artforum and Artscribe in London. The majority of the work he reviewed was performance art. He subsequently did a number of pieces of performance art at American Fine Arts, a gallery owned by his childhood friend and prominent figure of the artworld in the 80s and 90s, the late Colin Deland. One of these, "Taste" was based on the records of a World War II veteran who had a psychotic break.

He was by then working on his doctorate in Comparative Literature at New York University. The performance “Taste” had introduced him to the topic of his doctoral dissertation: the rise of mental health care after World War II based on the treatment of returning soldiers and how it became party of American culture.

As part of his research for his dissertation, he volunteered at an outpatient center for severely mentally ill patients. His dissertation was finished in 1996 and named "The Pure Products of America Go Crazy: The Language of Schizophrenia in the United States During the Early Cold War”.

It subsequently served as research material for his first feature film A Hole in One starring award-winning actress Michelle Williams. There he assistant-directed a series of plays created and performed by the patients, one of which, "Room 13A" was about a drug that cured all mental illness but had one side-effect: it brought back the dead. Richard played a small cameo role as Antonin Artaud working as a waiter. "Room 13A" was reviewed by "The Village Voice".

== Career ==
=== A Hole in One (2004) ===
A Hole in One is a feature film that stars Michelle Williams as a young woman who seeks out a lobotomy during the rise of the procedure in the 1950s. The film premiered at the Tribeca Film Festival in 2003 and is distributed by "Wellspring Home Entertainment". It was produced by Alexa L. Fogel and Joseph Infantolino.

The film tells the story of young woman Anna (played by Michelle Williams) in an American suburbs of the 1950s. Her brother comes home devastated after World War II and her father rejects him. The girl is lured into a relationship with Billy, a local mob boss. When her brother dies and she witnesses Billy murder a local nightclub owner, she is driven to the edge of insanity. She develops a fixation with mental health that drives her to seek out a transorbital lobotomy. When Dr. Harold Ashton, the foremost practitioner of this brand of lobotomy, comes to town, the entire community is buzzing. He starts performing the icepick lobotomy on alcoholics, veterans and other troubled outsiders. Influenced by the hyperbole surrounding the instant cure for a range of problems, Anna announces to Bill that she wants one.

Billy is concerned with his girlfriend's obsession so he takes her to a fake clinic fronted by Tom, a Korean War veteran on Billy's payroll who masquerades as a neurologist. Tom convinces Anna to delay the procedure. Tom and Anna share their traumas with one another and grow closer. Billy finds them together and sets off a final conflict that draws the film to a close.

Ledes conducted extensive research for the film over many years, including volunteering at an outpatient center for severely mentally ill. Additionally, he visited George Washington University, which holds the archives of Dr Walter Freeman. Rather than doing a documentary on Freeman or case studies on mental illness, Ledes approached the material through a fictional story.

Ledes' screenplay draws heavily on documents such as the New York Department of Mental Hygiene Annual Report of 1953. Other sources are: "Great and Desperate Cures: The Rise and Decline of Psychosurgery" and "Last Resort: Psychosurgery and Other Radical Treatments for Mental Illness" by Jack David Pressman. He also cites "The Lobotomist: A Maverick Medical Genius and His Tragic Quest to Rid the World of Mental Illness" by Jack El-Hai, which came out after "A Hole in One", as a reliable reference point.

The film contains a shot-by-shot remake of a real life lobotomy performed by Walter Freeman, the inventor of the transorbital lobotomy.

Ledes creates a mood of constant narrative dissonance, a sensation heightened by the strange comings, goings, and seemingly ad-libbed sayings of his characters, countless jumps in time, scientific and historical information thrown about with reckless abandon, and dreamy cinematographic moves (in one shot, the camera takes on the point of view of an oncoming wave) David Rooner from Variety has compared the film to Michel Gondry's Eternal Sunshine of a Spotless Mind. Stephen Trask (known for his soundtrack for Hedwig and the Angry Inch ) composed the original score of the film.

=== The Caller (2008) ===
The Caller is a noir thriller starring Frank Langella as Jimmy Stevens and Elliott Gould as Frank Turlotte. A contemplative thriller about an executive whistleblower who exposes a corrupt energy corporation's abuses, the film is a departure from the high stylization of A Hole in One.. The screenplay was co-written by Lacanian psychoanalyst Alain Didier-Weill.

The film won the Made in New York award at the 2008 Tribeca Film Festival. It was produced by Linda Moran and René Bastian.

Elliott Gould plays bird watcher and private eye Frank Turlette, who's hired—despite his initial reluctance—by an anonymous but apparently high-placed whistleblower (Frank Langella) at an international energy firm, E.N. Corporation, based in New York. He wants the detective to tail a man whom the company suspects is about to expose the company's corrupt practices in Latin America. But it turns out that the man Frank's been hired to tail and the man who hired him are one and the same. And as the two men's lives continue to intertwine, the puzzle pieces fall together, it's revealed that the man fully expects to be assassinated at any moment—and that he's haunted by a childhood incident that occurred during World War II. Less a mystery or even a corporate thriller, "The Caller" is more of an existential meditation on the meaning of life, guilt, memory and fear.

The film has received mixed reviews and was mainly criticized for its heavy symbolism in a New York Times review due to its many literary allusions and references to other works of art.

=== Fred Won't Move Out (2012) ===
Fred Won't Move Out is a fiction film where Elliott Gould plays Fred, who stands at the chasm between living alone with decreasing mobility in the house where he has lived for fifty years or leaving to live closer to his wife Susan (played by Judith Roberts), who has moderate Alzheimer's and whom the children (the son played by Fred Melamed and the daughter played by Stephanie Roth Haberle) are preparing to move to a care facility closer to them. The emotional precipice on which Fred teeters at first seems most shaken by the shifting condition of his wife Susan; her own dementia and ailing health has rendered her physicality a mere shadow of her former self and, to Fred, a stark preview of that which is coming his way, too. Susan – his Susan, anyway – is on the verge of no longer being there.

Shot in the house where Richard Ledes' parents lived for close to fifty years shortly after they moved out, the film's story is semi-autobiographical. The film was shot in sequence in three weeks and it features improvisational work by the ensemble cast. The style contains jittery, close-in camera, capturing quiet vignettes around the house, focusing on details, objects and minutiae. Richard Ledes has a short cameo with Fred Melamed's character.

According to the New York Times: "The movie gets almost everything right about the uncomfortable moment when grown children are forced to be their parents' parents. Its poignancy is distilled in a scene in which a music therapist leads three generations of the family in singing "Pack Up Your Troubles in Your Old Kit-Bag," “Ain't We Got Fun?" and "By the Light of the Silvery Moon." As long as she is singing, Susan is radiantly happy." Other critics have called the story "so up-close and personal it can be discomfiting", like "spending time with a real family".

=== Foreclosure (2012) ===
"Foreclosure" is a horror film that stars Michael Imperioli, best known for his work in mob sagas The Sopranos and Goodfellas. The film was advertised with the tagline "Ghosts Don't Move Out" – a nod to the director's previous work "Fred Won't Move Out".

Imperioli plays a man who takes his father-in-law and son to Queens to the house of a recently deceased relative. The neighborhood has been decimated by foreclosures, but they try to get a fresh start in the house. Then stuff starts happening. Spencer List, Bill Raymond, Wendell Pierce, Meital Dohan, Matt Servitto and David Costabile also are part of the ensemble cast.

The film explores the psychological response of the living to ghosts. It was inspired by the real estate market and the idea of isolation which is intrinsic to the sense of horror in the film. The isolation felt by the characters in the film is created through the effect of foreclosures on the neighborhood in which they live. "Foreclosure" references Caravaggio's "The Sacrifice of Isaac" (which was also featured in the first released trailer), Kierkegaard's Fear and Trembling and the character of Huckleberry Finn.

=== "Golden Dawn, NYC" (2014) ===
"Golden Dawn, NYC" is a short documentary about the Neo-Nazi party of Greece known as Golden Dawn and the New York City Greek community's attitude towards the party and the actions of some members of the community to combat any domestic support for fascism in Greece. The film features interviews with members of the Greek diaspora, including anarchist poet and historian Dan Georgakas. It was released online in June 2014 and attracted the attention of the party's NY supporters. The NY Golden Dawn supporters published on their website photos of the filmmaker and many of the people interviewed in the film, with anti-Semitic and homophobic remarks, pictures of relatives in some cases and what the supporters of the party believed to be the home addresses of some of the people interviewed. The article was then picked up by a US-based white supremacist website.

=== The Dark Side (2015) ===
The Dark Side is an docufiction film shot in post-Hurricane Sandy New York. It is set under the faux parameters of a romantic comedy that takes place in Manhattan and is mixed with real life interviews with the firefighters from Breezy Point and Far Rockaway who lost their homes to fire and water during Hurricane Sandy. It premiered in New York in April 2015 at the Queens World Film Festival and in Paris, France at the ÉCU The European Independent Film Festival

=== No Human Is Illegal (2018) ===
No Human Is Illegal is a personal encounter with the world of the refugees detained on the Greek island of Lesvos since March 20, 2016 due to the EU-Tukey deal on the migrant crisis. The island is also referred to as Lesbos or by its capital city Mytilene. Much of the film documents in and around Moria Refugee Camp, a refugee camp that BBC News called - "The Worst Refugee Camp on Earth". Ledes' film has appeared at several international Film Festivals including The Refugees Welcome Film Festival in Berlin, and the Commffest Global Community Film and Arts Festival in Toronto. Ledes has also screened the film in person at several educational institutions followed by a Q&A with the attendees including The School of Visual Arts, and the Bard Institute for International Liberal Education in New York.

== Style and themes ==
Some of the themes that feature prominently in Ledes' films are mental illness, the NYC Greek Community, racial identity, the economic crisis, neo-Nazism, Alzheimer disease, lobotomy, politics. The concepts of French psychoanalyst Jacques Lacan figure in the texts of Ledes' films which also underscore a post-Marxist form of ideology.

His films are noted for the multitude of literary and cultural allusions, references to other films and/or literature works, often being characterized as intellectual. He uses techniques such as genre subversion, close ups, narrative rhizome, intertextuality, montage, deconstruction. His works often require a subverted reading where conventions are changed and the reader/viewer is required to perform a re-writing of the visual text and a reevaluation of cinematic conventions.

Ledes' interest in Ancient Greek is another characteristic that is apparent in his work.

His style has been compared to that of David Lynch, The Coen Brothers and Michel Gondry. He has himself stated that he is interested in the directorial techniques based on improvisation of Mike Leigh and Robert Altman.

His narratives are concerned with the tension between seeing and witnessing

== Filmography ==
Year	Title	Notes
2025	V13	
2018	No Human Is Illegal	
2014	The Dark Side	
2014	Golden Dawn, NYC	
2012	Fred Won't Move Out	
2012	Foreclosure	
2008	The Caller	
2004	A Hole in One	

== Publications ==
- "Outsider" with Rafael Mahdavi, Orleans Press: Paris 1982
- "AIDS and the Ninjas" with the assistance of Martin G. Koloski Copyright 1 (Fall 1987)
- "Interview with Paul Virilio", "Specific Object: ZG Magazine" 1988
- "Sam Samore in Review", Artforum, April, pp. 166–167 1989
- "Dennis Adams, Alfredo Jaar, Jeff Wall: Tomoko Liguori Gallery." Artforum, January. 1989, pp. 113–14. 1989
- "From a Screenplay Entitled Anti (Going, Going) Gone (Based on Antigone by Sophocles)." Talisman 6 1991
- "Ground of Cyberspace" "Intelligent Agent" (co-founder) 1996
- "Let There Be Light: John Huston's Film and the concept of Trauma in the United States after WWi" Apres-Coup Psychoanalytic Association 1998
- "Bitten by a Monkey Satie's Sports & Divertissements" April 1999
