= Sex Ed (film) =

2014 film by Isaac Feder

- Theatrical release poster
- Directed by: Isaac Feder
- Written by: Bill Kennedy
- Produced by: Monika Casey; Stephen Feder; Elayne Schneiderman; Dori Sperko
- Starring: Haley Joel Osment; Lorenza Izzo; Laura Harring; Abby Elliott; Glen Powell; Retta; Matt Walsh
- Cinematography: Brian Burgoyne
- Edited by: Christopher Gay
- Music by: Alexander Kemp
- Production company: Sweet Tomato Films
- Distributed by: MarVista Entertainment
- Release date: November 7, 2014
- Running time: 90 minutes
- Country: United States
- Language: English
- Budget: $5 million

Sex Ed is a 2014 American comedy film directed by Isaac Feder and written by Bill Kennedy. The film stars Haley Joel Osment, Lorenza Izzo, Laura Harring, Abby Elliott, Glen Powell, Retta, and Matt Walsh. Sex Ed premiered at the Portland Film Festival on August 29, 2014, and was released in theaters on November 7, 2014, by MarVista Entertainment.

== Plot ==
Ed Cole is 23 and feels like he is wasting his life. He leaves his job at a bagel shop and works as an after-school detention teacher at an inner-city middle school after impressing the principal. He moves out of his apartment, allowing his roommate JT to engage in kinky sex with his girlfriend Ally. While working with his students, Ed realizes that most of the troubled youths are sexually confused, and begins an after-school sex ed program. At the same time, JT convinces Ed to have sex with someone, leading to a disastrous blind date with Trish, a former student.

Ed seeks advice from his landlady Sydney, who also owns a bar in the apartment building. He meets Pilar, the adult sister of his student Tito. He and Pilar hit it off, and she invites Ed to her house for dinner after Tito tells her Ed is his favorite teacher. Pilar's boyfriend Hector belittles Ed and threatens him, leading to the two competing by taking shots of rum. Ed vomits on Pilar and Tito's mother, Lupe. Later Ed apologizes to Pilar, who tells him that she and Hector are taking a break. Ed asks her on a date, which she accepts. With the help of JT and Ally, Ed gets his students interested in learning, to the point that other children attend the after school class out of interest.

At the same time, Ed's student Leon gets sent to the principal's office for his behavior, leading to his father Reverend Marcus Hamilton challenging Ed's qualifications and reasoning to teach sexual education to the children. Ed asks the Reverend to sit in on a class, but the Reverend is not impressed and decides to shut down the program. Tito tells Ed he wants to have sex with his girlfriend and asks for a condom. Ed tells Tito it is not a good idea, but Tito says he will do it anyway, forcing Ed to give him a condom. Pilar finds out about this during her date with Ed, and goes home to stop Tito. Ed angrily leaves, but is confronted and beat up by Hector. He then attempts to hire a prostitute, but he decides against sex when he sees that she has male genitalia. The police arrive, so the prostitute runs off and Ed is arrested.

Ed admits to JT that he is a virgin, which JT previously knew but chose not to call Ed out on. Ed returns to work at the bagel shop, but then with Sydney's help decides to make a grand gesture to win Pilar back. He plays the oboe for her, despite not being very good at it. Ed and Pilar make up and go on a second date. Pilar decides to visit her favorite club, but Ed is not allowed in by the bouncer. Pilar tells him that she will be right back, but the bouncer says she will not. Hector, in line for the club, confronts Ed, and Ed punches Hector, resulting in the police arresting Ed again. Motivated by his anger, Ed forces his way into Reverend Hamilton's support group with his class, insisting the importance of sex education, which the children support. Ed admits that he is a virgin in front of everyone. For his demonstration, Reverend Hamilton is impressed and decides to allow the class.

Pilar shows up at Ed's apartment and tells him that she wants to be his first sexual partner, but wanting to wait until after hanging out in the bar downstairs, Ed turns her down. She leaves angrily, but passes JT in her underwear, impressing him. Ed is upset that he still has not had sex, but Sydney tells him that he is a man now because he is in control of his life, and it has nothing to do with his virginity. A year later, Ed is shown to have one of the most popular classes at the school, and the respect of his students.

== Cast ==
- Haley Joel Osment as Ed Cole
- Lorenza Izzo as Pilar
- Kevin Hernandez as Tito
- Retta as Sydney
- Matt Walsh as Washout
- Glen Powell as JT
- Abby Elliott as Trish
- Laura Harring as Lupe
- Castille Landon as Ally
- Lamorne Morris as Bobby the Bouncer
- Ray Santiago as Hector
- Isaac White as Leon Hamilton
- Chris Williams as Reverend Hamilton
- Parker Young as Montana
- Vadli Belizaire as Shelly
- Parvesh Cheena as Hank
- George Eads as Jimmy
- Monika Casey as Suzanne
- Abbe Meryl Feder as Louise
- Kelly Gray as Ashley
- Julia E King as Stevie
- Nicholas Patel as Fish
- Ally Rahn as Margarita
- J. Larose as Reiny

== Reception ==
Sex Ed received mixed reviews from critics. On Rotten Tomatoes, the film has a rating of 64%, based on 11 reviews, with an average rating of 5.2/10. On Metacritic, the film has a rating of 34 out of 100, based on six critics' reviews, indicating "generally unfavorable reviews".

== Remake ==
The film was remade as the 2024 gender-swapped film Doin' It. Despite being based on his screenplay, Bill Kennedy is not given a writing credit for the 2024 film.
