= Laura Harring =

Mexican and American actress (born 1964)

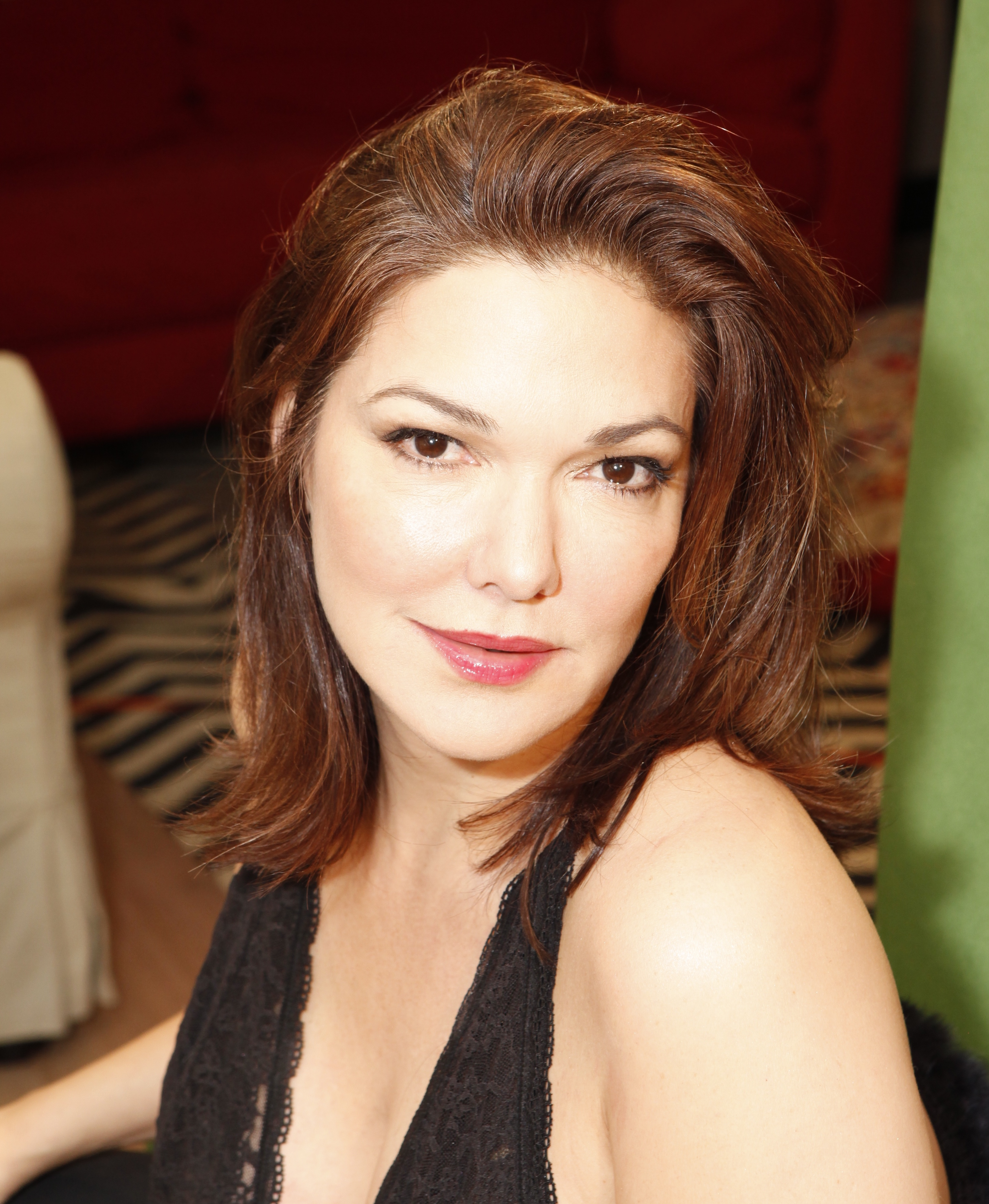
- Harring in 2016
- Born: Laura Elena Herring Martínez; March 3, 1964 (age 62); Los Mochis, Sinaloa, Mexico
- Occupation: Actress
- Spouse: Carl-Eduard von Bismarck (m. 1987; div. 1989)
- Beauty pageant titleholder
- Title: Miss Texas USA 1985; Miss USA 1985
- Years active: 1987–present
- Major competitions: Miss Texas USA 1985; (Winner); Miss USA 1985; (Winner); Miss Universe 1985; (Top 10)
- Website: lauraharring.net

Laura Elena Harring (née Herring Martínez, formerly Gräfin von Bismarck-Schönhausen; born March 3, 1964) is a Mexican and American actress and beauty pageant titleholder who won Miss USA 1985 and later began acting in television and film. She is best known for her lead role as Rita in the 2001 movie Mulholland Drive. Her other films include The Forbidden Dance (1990), John Q (2002), Willard (2003), The Punisher (2004), The King (2005), Love in the Time of Cholera (2007), Ghost Son (2007), The Caller (2008), Drool (2009), Sex Ed (2014), and Inside (2016). She also played Carla Greco in General Hospital (1990–1991), Paula Stevens on Sunset Beach (1997), and Rebecca "Becca" Doyle in The Shield (2006).

== Life and career ==
=== Early years and education ===
Laura Elena Herring Martínez was born in Los Mochis, Sinaloa, Mexico, on March 3, 1964. Her mother, María Elena Martínez-Cairo, is a Mexican spiritual teacher, real estate investor, and former secretary. Her father, Raymond Herring, was a Mexican developer and organic farmer of Austrian-German descent. The two divorced in 1971. Harring lived the first ten years of her life in Guasave, Sinaloa, Mexico, before her family relocated to San Antonio, Texas. Harring suffered a head wound from a .45 bullet when she was caught by stray fire from a driveby shooting at age 12. At age 16, she convinced her family to let her study in Switzerland at Aiglon College. Harring studied theatre at London Academy of Music and Dramatic Art, having trained in the Italian commedia dell'arte, as well as Latin dances, including the Argentine tango. She eventually returned to the United States, settling down in El Paso, Texas, and began competing in beauty pageants.

=== Pageantry ===
Harring won Miss El Paso USA, Miss Texas USA, then Miss USA 1985, becoming the first Hispanic woman to do so. Harring then spent the next year traveling through Asia, exploring Europe and working as a social worker in India. Her national costume at Miss Universe was a cowgirl.

=== Acting ===
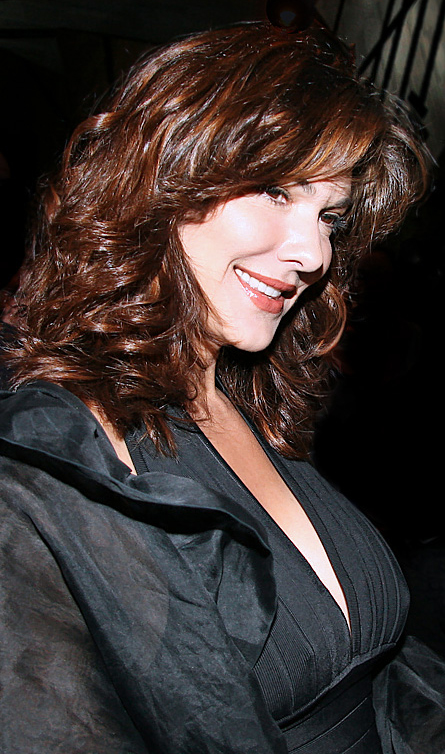
Harring at the 2008 Toronto International Film Festival

Harring began acting in 1987, in the NBC television movie The Alamo: 13 Days to Glory (1987). She played Raúl Juliá's character's wife, having been cast by NBC producers after they saw her on the Miss USA broadcast and contacted her with the role. In 1989, she appeared in her first movie, Silent Night, Deadly Night 3: Better Watch Out!, in the supporting role of Jerri, a flight attendant.

In 1990, Harring was lead actress in the Columbia Pictures release The Forbidden Dance, in which she played the role of Nisa, a Brazilian princess. That same year, she began a recurring role on the ABC daytime soap General Hospital, as Carla Greco. The next few years, she had supporting roles in movies - Exit to Eden (1994), and Black Scorpion II: Aftershock (1997). In 1997, she played the role of Paula Stevens in the NBC soap opera Sunset Beach. After leaving the show, she guest-starred on Frasier in the episode "Dial M for Martin", and appeared in the comedy film Little Nicky.

Harring is best known for her performance in David Lynch's 2001 movie Mulholland Drive, opposite Naomi Watts and Justin Theroux. She played both the characters of Rita (an amnesiac who names herself after Rita Hayworth when seeing the name on a poster for the movie Gilda) and Camilla. In response to her performance and the choice of her for the role, film critic Roger Ebert wrote, "Not many actresses would be bold enough to name themselves after Rita Hayworth, but Harring does, because she can. Slinky and voluptuous in clinging gowns, all she has to do is stand there and she's the first good argument in 55 years for a Gilda remake." Comparisons were also made between Harring and Ava Gardner by the International Herald Tribune. In 2002, she was awarded the American Latino Media Arts (ALMA) Award for Outstanding Actress in a Feature Film for her performance. Harring went on to work twice more with Lynch—as an anthropomorphic rabbit in the limited series Rabbits (2002) and in a cameo appearance in Inland Empire (2006).

In 2002, she appeared in John Q, and was female lead opposite Jean-Claude Van Damme in Derailed. In 2003, she starred in Mi Casa, Su Casa together with Barbara Eden. In 2004, she was the spoiled wife of antagonist Mr. Saint (John Travolta), Livia Saint in the movie adaptation of Marvel Comics's The Punisher. In 2005, Harring starred in the independent film The King, and later had roles in Nancy Drew, Love in the Time of Cholera, The Caller, and Drool, in which she plays an abused wife fleeing her husband.

In 2006, Harring joined the cast of FX's crime drama, The Shield, as defense attorney Rebecca Doyle, appearing in nine episodes of season five. In the role, she is hired by lead character Vic Mackey to protect his team of corrupt police officers against an Internal Affairs investigation. From 2009 to 2010, she also appeared in four episodes as Evelyn Bass/Elizabeth Fisher in The CW series Gossip Girl. In the show, she plays a woman posing as the long-lost mother of the character Chuck Bass, before her deceit is discovered by the other characters. She also guest-starred on Law & Order: Special Victims Unit in 2003, Law & Order: Criminal Intent in 2010, and NCIS: Los Angeles in 2012 and 2016. Harring was also cast in the independent film The Loner directed by Daniel Grove. In 2016 she was cast in the English-language remake of the film Inside, and in Legendary's first digital film The Thinning, alongside Logan Paul and Peyton List. In 2022, she appeared in the romantic comedy Father of the Bride playing Diego Boneta's mother.

=== Personal life ===
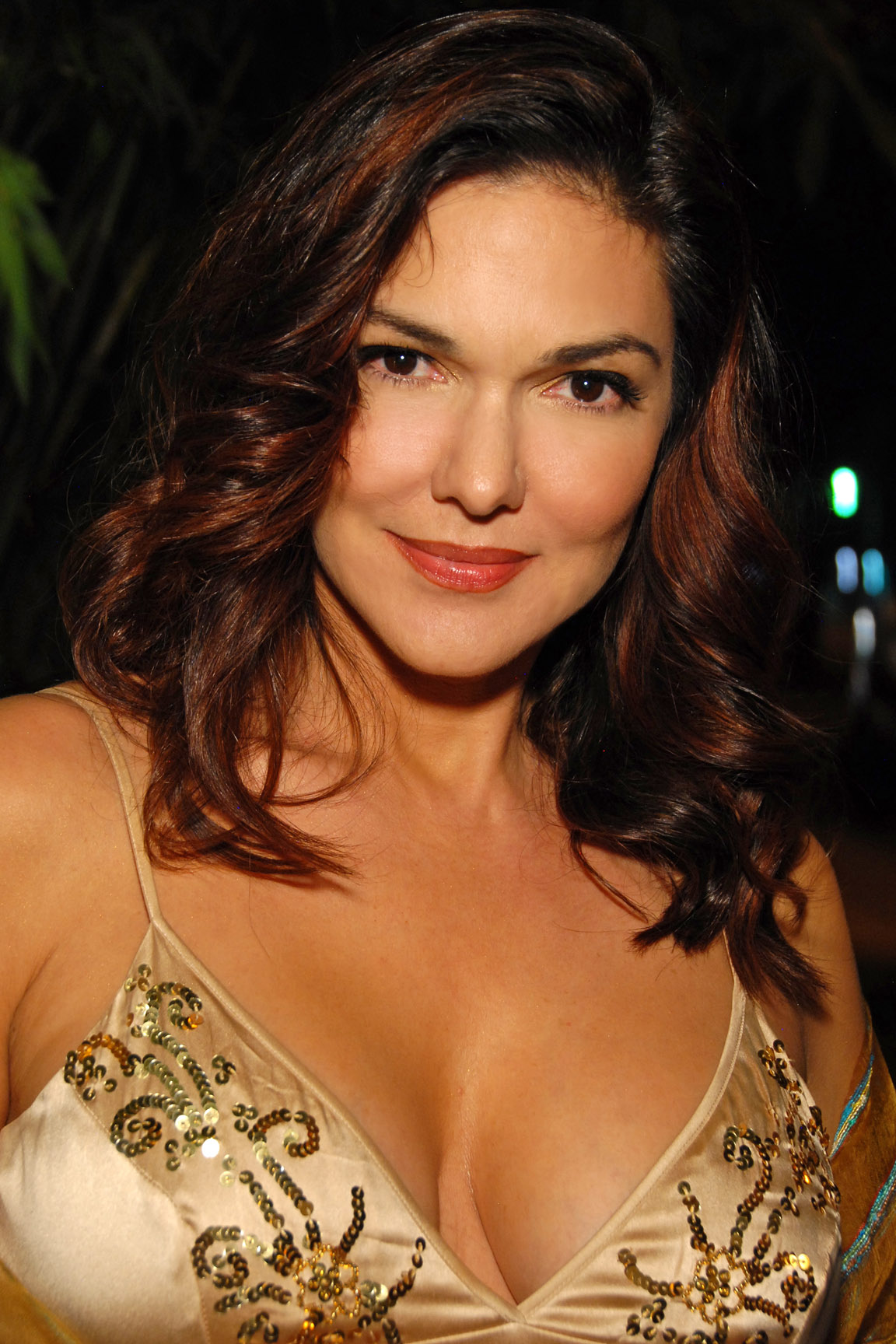
Laura Harring 2011

In 1987, Harring married Count Carl-Eduard von Bismarck-Schönhausen, great-great-grandson of Otto von Bismarck. They divorced in 1989.

== Filmography ==
=== Film ===
Year	Title	Role	Notes
1989	Silent Night, Deadly Night 3: Better Watch Out!	Jerri	
1990	The Forbidden Dance	Nisa	
1991	Dead Women in Lingerie	Marcia	
1994	Exit to Eden	M.C. Kindra	
1997	Black Scorpion II: Aftershock	Babette	
1997	Hoover Park	Unknown	
2000	Little Nicky	Mrs. Dunleavy	
2001	Final Payback	Gina Carrillo	
2001	Feather Pimento	Woman in Red	Short film
2001	Mulholland Drive	Camilla Rhodes/Rita	Credited as Laura Elena Harring ALMA Award for Outstanding Actress in a Motion Picture
2002	John Q.	Gina Palumbo	
2002	Derailed	Galina Konstantin	
2002	Rabbits	Jane	
2003	Willard	Cathryn	
2003	Loco Love	Catalina	
2003	The Poet	Paula	
2004	The Punisher	Livia Saint	
2005	All Souls Day	Martia	
2005	The King	Twyla	
2006	Walkout	Francis Crisostomo	
2006	Inland Empire	Jane Rabbit / Party Guest	
2007	Ghost Son	Stacey	
2007	Nancy Drew	Dehlia Draycott	
2007	Love in the Time of Cholera	Sara Noriega	
2008	One Missed Call	Mrs. Raymond	Cameo
2008	The Caller	Eileen	
2009	Drool	Anora Fleece	
2010	Kluge		
2011	Elwood	Julie Jacobs	Short film
2013	Return to Babylon	Alla Nazimova	
2014	Ice Scream	Wendy	
2014	Taco Shop		
2014	Manson Girls	Alice Rainer	
2014	Sex Ed	Lupe	
2016	The Thinning	Georgina Preston	
2016	Inside	The Woman	
2016	Love Kills	Rosa	
2018	The Thinning: New World Order	Georgina Preston	
2022	Father of the Bride	Marcela Castillo	

=== Television ===
Year	Title	Role	Notes
1987	The Alamo: 13 Days to Glory	Santa Anna's bride	Television movie
1988	Desperado: Avalanche at Devil's Ridge	Unknown	Television movie
1988	Beauty and the Beast	Carmen	Episode: "The Alchemist"
1989	Alien Nation	Female Newcomer	Episode: "Three to Tango"
1990–91	General Hospital	Carla Greco	Recurring role
1992	Baywatch	Princess Catherine Randenberg	Episode: "Princess of Tides"
1993	Blossom	Nurse	Episode: "The Fifty-Minute Hour"
1993	Rio Diablo	Maria Benjamin	Television movie
1995	Empire	Gabriella Cochrane	Unsuccessful television pilot
1995–96	Flipper	Garcia	3 episodes
1996	Baywatch Nights	Charlotte 'Charlie' McBride	Episode: "Thin Blood"
1996, 1999	Silk Stalkings	Paula Houston / Yvette	Episodes: "Family Values", "Cook's Tour"
1997	Sunset Beach	Paula Stevens	Series regular, 141 episodes. Nominated — ALMA Award for Outstanding Actress in a Daytime Soap Opera
1997	California	Christina Guevara	Unsuccessful television pilot (spin-off from Dr. Quinn, Medicine Woman)
1998	Frasier	Rebecca Wendell	Episode: "Dial M for Martin"
2000	Beyond Belief: Fact or Fiction	Mysterious Woman	Episode: "Episode 30" Segment: Deadbeat Daddy
2000	Black Scorpion	Ariana	Episode: "Out of Thin Air"
2000	A Family in Crisis: The Elian Gonzales Story	Marisleysis Gonzalez	Television movie
2003	Law & Order: Special Victims Unit	Joan Quentin	Episode: "Perfect"
2006	The Shield	Rebecca Doyle	8 episodes
2007	My Neighbor's Keeper	Kate Powell	Television movie
2009	Gossip Girl	Evelyn Bass/Elizabeth	4 episodes
2010	Law & Order: Criminal Intent	Marta Caldera	Episode: "True Legacy"
2012–19	NCIS: Los Angeles	Julia Feldman	5 episodes
2014–15	Chasing Life	Olivia Ortiz	Episodes: "Guess Who's Coming to Donate?", "First Person"

Awards and achievements
Preceded by Laura Shaw	Miss Texas USA; 1985	Succeeded by Christy Fichtner
Preceded by New Mexico Mai Shanley	Miss USA; 1985	Succeeded by Texas Christy Fichtner
Media offices
Preceded by Angie Dickinson	Miss USA color commentator (with Leeza Gibbons); 1990	Succeeded by Barbara Eden and Deborah Shelton
Preceded by Leeza Gibbons and Courtney Gibbs	Miss USA color commentator (with Arthel Neville); 1994	Succeeded by Daisy Fuentes
