= Ozioma Akagha =

American actress

- Born: Ozioma Akagha; Los Altos, California, U.S.
- Education: Southern Methodist University
- Occupation: Actress
- Years active: 2010–present
- Known for: Half-Life: Alyx, Deathloop

Ozioma Akagha is an American actress. She voices Alyx Vance in the video game Half-Life: Alyx (2020) and Julianna in the video game Deathloop (2021). She also plays the role of Harper Omereoha in the television show Delilah.

== Career ==
Akagha attended Southern Methodist University in Dallas, Texas, where she majored in theatre. In the early 2010s, she acted in theatrical productions in California. In 2010, she played Tiger Lily in the Pacific Conservatory of the Performing Arts's production of Peter Pan. In 2011, she acted alongside Brendan Cataldo in Leo Cortez's play, Acting Out, at the Alisal Center for the Fine Arts. In 2012, Akagha began playing the leads in various short films and making guest appearances in television series. She appeared in one-off episodes in the series Men at Work, Nashville and 2 Broke Girls.

Akagha started voice acting in video games around 2016, first voicing the character "Plastic" in the game Mirror's Edge: Catalyst. In 2017, she was a voice actor for Wolfenstein II: The New Colossus, in which she provided voices for characters Barbara Casey, Zena Woodard, and Angela Cummings.

In 2018, she began appearing in Marvel's Runaways television series as Tamar, a recurring, supporting role. She provided the voice for the superheroine Bumblebee in the animated series Teen Titans Go!. Bumblebee initially appeared in the show's fifth season in the episode "Forest Pirates", which aired in 2019.

Akagha voiced the main character, Alyx Vance, in the virtual reality game Half-Life: Alyx. The character was first introduced in the game Half-Life 2 in 2004, being originally played by Merle Dandridge. A new actor was chosen for Alyx Vance partially due to the character's younger age and the "time gap" between this and the previous game. Akagha began recording for the role in September 2019, and the game was released in 2020.

In the 2021 video game Deathloop, Akagha voiced Julianna, one of two main characters and the main antagonist in the game. She also played Harper Omereoha in the OWN drama television series, Delilah, which started airing in 2021.

Akagha voiced Shuri in the Marvel Cinematic Universe animated series What If...?, replacing Letitia Wright. She also voiced the recurring role of Flora Flamingo in the 2021 children's show, Do, Re & Mi.

== Honors ==
In 2021, Akagha was nominated for the Golden Joystick Awards in the category of Best Performer for voicing the character Julianna Blake in Deathloop. For the same role, she was also nominated for Best Performance at The Game Awards 2021, and for the Great White Way Award for Best Acting in a Game at the New York Game Awards 2022.

== Filmography ==
=== Television ===
Year	Title	Role	Notes	Ref(s)
2018–2019	Runaways	Tamar	Recurring role	
2019	Teen Titans Go!	Bumblebee	Recurring voice role	
2021–2024	What If...?	Shuri; Adolescent Girl	Voice; 3 episodes	
2021	Delilah	Harper Omereoha	Main role	
2021	Do, Re & Mi	Flora Flamingo	Recurring voice role	
2023–present	The Loud House	Sharon Loud	4 episodes	
2023–2024	Jessica's Big Little World	Big Jessica	Recurring voice role	
2024–2025	Everybody Still Hates Chris	Tonya	Main voice role	
2025	Grey's Anatomy	Gabby Mims	Guest appearance; 1 episode	

=== Film ===
Year	Title	Role	Notes	Ref(s)
2023	Justice League x RWBY: Super Heroes & Huntsmen	Vixen / Mari McCabe	Voice role	

=== Video games ===
Year	Title	Role	Notes	Ref(s)
2016	Mirror's Edge Catalyst	Plastic		
2017	Wolfenstein II: The New Colossus	Barbara Casey, Zena Woodard, and Angela Cummings		
2020	Exos Heroes	Dorka, Kirina, and Risis		
2020	Gears 5: Hivebusters	Hana Cole		
2020	Half-Life: Alyx	Alyx Vance		
2021	Deathloop	Julianna Blake		
2022	Grounded	Willow Branch	Early access in 2020	
2022	Saints Row	Chloe Morris		
2023	Goodbye Volcano High	Trish		

== Accolades ==
Year	Work	Award	Category	Result	Ref
2021	Deathloop	Golden Joystick Awards	Best Performer	Nominated	
2021	Deathloop	The Game Awards	Best Performance	Nominated	
2022	Deathloop	New York Game Awards	Great White Way Award for Best Acting in a Game	Nominated	
2022	Deathloop	BAFTA Games Awards	Performer in a Leading Role	Nominated	
