= Ozioma Bennett Ebonine =

Member of the House of Representatives of Nigeria from Imo
- Incumbent
- Assumed office June 2023
- Constituency: Njaba State Constituency

Personal details
- Born: 5/July/1985
- Citizenship: Nigeria
- Party: All Progressives Congress

Ozioma Bennett Ebonine (born 5 July 1985), also known as Ezengwori Njaba or Ezi Ngwori Worship, is a Nigerian politician currently serving as the member representing Njaba State Constituency in the Imo State House of Assembly since 2023. He chairs the House Committee on Housing and Rural Development.

== Early life and background ==
Born on 5 July 1985, Ebonine is married and identifies as a Christian.

== Political career ==
Ozioma Bennett Ebonine is a Nigerian politician currently serving as the member representing Njaba State Constituency in the Imo State House of Assembly, a position he assumed in 2023. A member of the All Progressives Congress (APC). He was appointed as the Chairman of the House Committee on Housing and Rural Development, where he plays a key role in shaping policies related to housing infrastructure and the development of rural communities within Imo State.

- In July 2024, he sponsored a motion urging Governor Hope Uzodimma to formally recognize Autonomous Community Youth Presidents in Imo and empower youth leaders in governance a move praised by youth representatives.
- In October 2024, he sponsored an agricultural revitalization motion, co-signed by 16 other members of the Assembly, aimed at boosting food production, lowering food prices, and transforming Imo State’s economy from a consumption-based model to one focused on production.
- He collaborated with GetBundi Tech and other partners to launch a six-month coding and digital literacy program, providing STEM and digital skills training to twelve youths from Umuaka.

== Honors and recognition ==
He has been honored with multiple awards, including a Distinguished Award of Excellence from the Anglican Bishop of Orlu and a Merit Award from the Catholic Bishop of Owerri, recognizing his humanitarian services.
