= Angelic (band) =

British musical group

Angelic was a British trance group featuring Darren Tate, Judge Jules and Jules's wife, Amanda O'Riordan.

== History ==
In 1999, when Judge Jules and Darren Tate launched their collaboration named Angelic, Jules was already a successful club and radio DJ. For Darren Tate, the project was the beginning of his musical career. Jules' wife Amanda was featured as a singer in the project.

The debut single "It's My Turn" was successful, reaching number 11 and remaining on the UK Singles Chart for 10 weeks. Instrumentally, the track was based on their previously issued remix of "Change" by Sunscreem, slightly shortened and with new lyrics. The song was also remixed by Rank 1 and 4 Strings.

In 2001, the trio released two more singles, "Can't Keep Me Silent" and "Stay with Me", which also reached the UK Singles Chart. After that, the group split up with Jules and Tate both pursuing their individual solo careers. O'Riordan's voice appeared again in 2005 on the song "Without Love" by Judge Jules.

== Discography ==
=== Singles ===
- 2000: "It's My Turn" – UK #11
- 2001: "Can't Keep Me Silent" – UK #12
- 2001: "Stay with Me" – UK #36

=== Remixes ===
- 1999: John '00' Fleming – "Lost in Emotion"
- 2000: Plasma feat. Berri – "Do U Believe"
- 2000: Lost Witness – "7 Colours"
- 2000: Kayestone – "Atmosphere"
- 2000: JBN – "All I Want"
- 2000: Sundance – "Won't Let This Feeling Go"
- 2000: Sunscreem – "Change"
- 2000: Orion – "Rush"
