= Russ Parr =

American radio DJ, director, writer, actor and TV personality

- Born: April 12th 1959; California, United States
- Occupation(s): Radio DJ, actor, film director, writer
- Website: therussparrmorningshow.com

Russ Parr (born April 12 1959 in California) is an American radio DJ, film director, writer, actor and television personality known for such television shows as Rock 'N' America.

== Career ==
Parr began as a Production Services Director at ABC TV. Russ was the morning DJ on KDAY doing imitations of Magic Johnson, Ronald Reagan, and other celebrities. He also worked as a stand-up comic for 8 years, performing his first show as an opening act for Joan Rivers in Santa Monica, California. Parr also found parts on a number of television shows including Martin, The Jenny Jones Show, and Turnstyle, and appeared in television commercials for Kodak and McDonald's. Parr left KDAY (Hollywood) in 1989 and ended up working on KJMZ in Dallas, Texas.

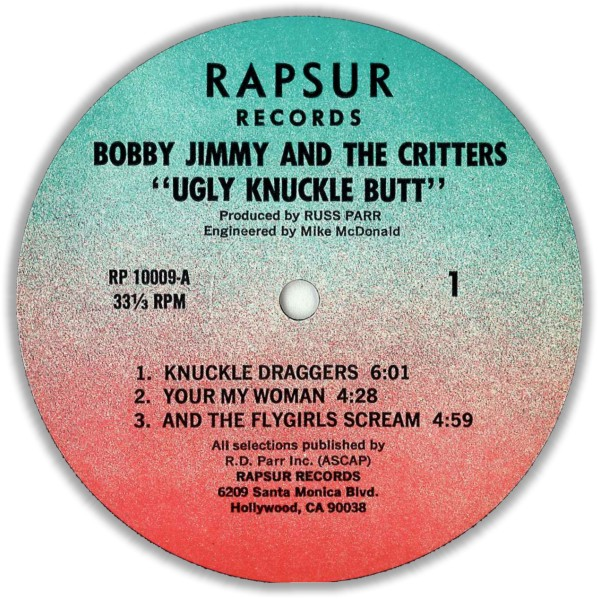
Parr released the first album for Bobby Jimmy & the Critters titled Ugly Knuckle Butt in 1985

Before Parr began as a radio personality, however, he had a recording career under the pseudonym Bobby Jimmy. In the mid-1980s, he owned and ran his own recording label, Rapsur Records (an inversion of his name). On it he released records as Bobby Jimmy and the Critters. He scored a few hits, including "Roaches" (a parody of Timex Social Club's song "Rumors"); "We Like Ugly Women," "One Glove" (a song satirizing Michael Jackson), and "Ugly Knuckle Butt," which still receives airplay on such outlets as the Doctor Demento Show. Bobby Jimmy released three albums before fading into obscurity. Bobby Jimmy and The Critters was also credited on N.W.A's first album N.W.A and the Posse (1987), because Arabian Prince was a member of The Critters.

In 1989, he left Hollywood (where he was a morning host on Los Angeles' 1580 KDAY, the first all hip-hop radio station) for Dallas, Texas, where he worked at KJMZ 100.3 JAMZ. He also launched FLAVA TV, which enabled him to direct, write, and act.

In 1996 he moved to Washington, D.C., and Radio One's 93.9 WKYS-FM, where he began the Russ Parr Morning Show with Olivia Foxx. By Spring 1997 the show was number one in the D.C. radio market. In December 2002 Foxx left and the show went national. Georgia Foy, also known as Alfredas, Parr's former co-host in Texas, joined as Foxx's replacement.

Parr made his directing debut with the 2006 drama The Last Stand. He directed the roast of John Witherspoon, as well as the comedies Love for Sale, Something Like a Business, 35 and Ticking, and The Undershepherd.

Parr hosted the Russ Parr Morning Show, heard weekdays by more than 3.2 million listeners in 45 U.S. cities, and nationally syndicated by Reach Media. He also hosted a weekend show, On Air with Russ Parr, which can be heard on more than 40 radio stations. Aside from his radio gigs, Parr is also the co-host of the TV One dating show Get the Hook Up.

In December 2023, Parr announced the end of his morning show.
