= Kenneth Lampl =

American composer and lecturer (born 1964)

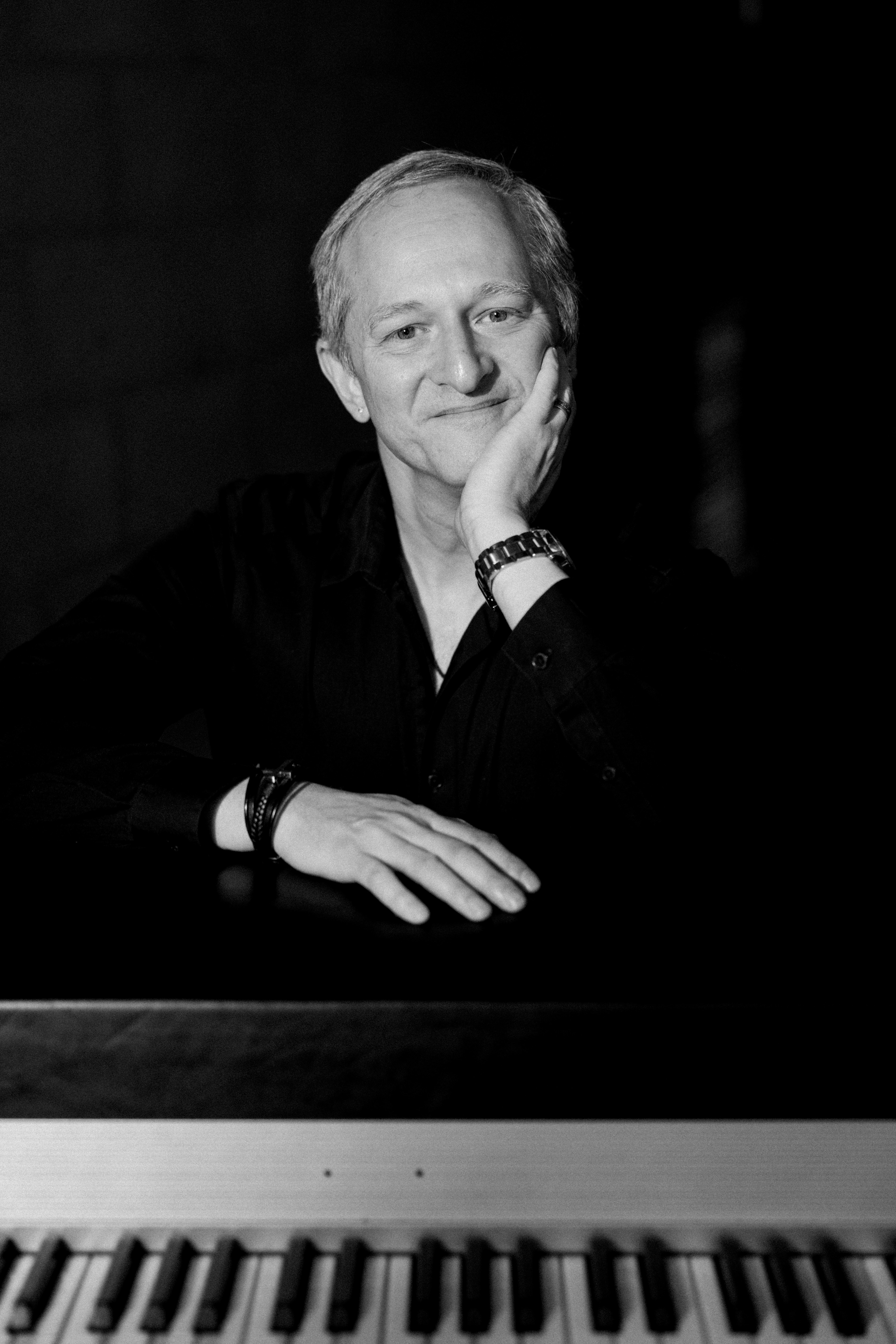
- Kenneth Lampl, 2026
- Born: November 7, 1964 (age 61); The Bronx, New York, U.S.
- Education: Rutgers University (Bachelor of Music (B.M.) in Jazz Performance; Master of Music (M.M.) in Music Composition); Juilliard School (DMA in Classical Composition)
- Occupations: Film composer Choral and orchestral composer Professor
- Years active: 1986–present
- Employer: Australian National University School of Music
- Known for: Scoring 100 films, including Pokémon: The First Movie, 2067, and Monument
- Spouse: Maria Filardo
- Awards: Joseph H. Bearns Prize
- Website: kenlampl.com

Kenneth Lampl (born November 7, 1964) is an American film composer, choral composer, and academic. He serves as a lecturer and the Convenor of the Composition for Film and Video Games program at the Australian National University School of Music, where he was formerly the Head of the School.

Educated at Rutgers University and the Juilliard School, Lampl initially trained as a jazz saxophonist under Paul Jeffrey and Sahib Shihab, before pursuing classical composition with Charles Wuorinen, Milton Babbitt, and John Corigliano.

Lampl has composed music for over 100 films, as well as television series and video games. He is also a composer of contemporary sacred and secular choral music, known for his Hebrew liturgical musical settings such as "Adon Olam" and "Dirshu Adonai." Included among the films for which he has composed music are the animated fantasy adventure film Pokémon: The First Movie and the science fiction film 2067. It was followed in 2026 by his sweeping orchestral score for the historical drama film Monument, directed by Bryan Singer and starring Jon Voight.

== Biography ==
Lampl was born in the Bronx, New York, on November 7, 1964, and is Jewish. He and his family later moved to Ewing Township, New Jersey. He graduated from Ewing High School in 1982 and was inducted into the National Honor Society in his senior year. His father, Dr. Melvin Lampl, was an Army veteran of the Korean War who earned a PhD from Yeshiva University and worked as a clinical psychologist and director of psychology at Trenton Psychiatric Hospital, and his mother was Sondra Lampl.

Lampl performed as part of jazz drummer and band leader Chico Hamilton's sextet, the Young Altos. They performed at Lincoln Center, the Apollo Theater, and the 1986 JVC Jazz Festival.

He studied jazz saxophone and music composition with saxophonists Paul Jeffrey and Sahib Shihab at Rutgers University at the Rutgers University–New Brunswick campus in the Mason Gross School of the Arts from 1987 to 1991, and was a member of the Rutgers University Jazz Ensemble. At Rutgers, Lampl earned a Bachelor of Music (B.M.) degree in Jazz Performance.

Lampl began his first classical composition studies with Pulitzer Prize-winning contemporary classical music composer Charles Wuorinen in the graduate program at Rutgers University, where he earned a Master of Music (M.M.) in Music Composition. Lampl's first international recognition came in 1991 with his winning the "Prix Ravel" in composition from the American Conservatory in Fontainebleau, France, and his first orchestral piece "Parallax" won the Cincinnati Symphony Orchestra Young Composers Award, the ASCAP Award for Young Composers, and the Joseph H. Bearns Prize in Composition from Columbia University.

After finishing his masters degree, in 1992 he began doctoral studies at the Juilliard School, studying with composer and music theorist Milton Babbitt and classical music composer John Corigliano. In 1996 Lampl received his DMA in Classical Composition. Lampl taught Literature and Materials of Music there in the academic years 1996–99. At the Juilliard School he received the Gretchanov Memorial Prize in Composition and fellowships from the foundations of Henry Mancini, George Gershwin, and Richard Rodgers. In 1998 he was awarded a composer fellowship to the Tanglewood Music Festival. There, he studied film scoring with composer and conductor John Williams.

== Film and television scoring ==
Lampl's first film score for the short film "Six Miles of Eight Feet" premiered at the 2000 Sundance Film Festival and won a Student Academy Award, as well as Best Original Score from the NYU First Run Film Festival. His next score "Empty" won Best Narrative Short at the Cinequest San Jose Film Festival and a Student Emmy award.

His first work to appear on a feature-length film was composing as an "additional composer" on the American re-score of Pokémon: The First Movie, The same musical piece composition was subsequently reused on the films' TV special sequel, Pokémon: Mewtwo Returns.

He has composed music for over 100 films, spanning mainstream dramas, independent features, and psychological thrillers. They include: the Western thriller Frontera (starring Ed Harris and Eva Longoria), the comedy 35 and Ticking (starring Kevin Hart and Nicole Ari Parker), the true-crime drama Winter of Frozen Dreams (starring Thora Birch and Keith Carradine), and the action thriller Royal Kill (starring Pat Morita and Eric Roberts). Beyond film, Lampl composed themes and underlying underscore for network television series as well, including the comedy-drama Born Again Virgin and the musical drama Saints & Sinners. He frequently collaborates with electronic dance music artist and producer Darren Tate. His score to the 2020 science fiction film entitled 2067, released on Milan Records, was listed in "The Best Scores of 2020" by the Film Music Institute.

Lampl scored the music in the 2026 Bryan Singer-directed historical drama film Monument, in which Jon Voight stars as the Israeli architect Yaakov Rechter, alongside Joseph Mazzello (who plays his son). The score received positive critical attention. Film Threat wrote that "the music pushes the whole production to greatness," while Cinemacy described Lampl's "sweeping score" as amplifying "the film’s overall boldness."

== Choral music ==
Lampl has been a composer of contemporary sacred and secular choral music. His first choral work in Hebrew,"Adon Olam," was commissioned, premiered, and recorded by the Zamir Chorale of Boston. The contemporary musical setting was later commercially released by the ensemble on their European tour retrospective album, From Boston to Berlin.

Other notable choral works include: the biblical adaptation "Jerusalem", "After the Wind," and the Psalm 105 meditation of the Book of Psalms "Dirshu Adonai," which were compositions featured by the American Choral Directors Association. The composition was featured by the American Choral Directors Association. His choral music is currently published by Walton Music, Alfred Music, Santa Barbara Music Publishing, and Colla Voce Music.

== Academic leadership and curriculum development; Australia ==
In February 2017, Lampl relocated to Australia following his appointment as the Head of the Australian National University (ANU) School of Music in Canberra. His tenure commenced in March 2017. After completing a two-year term, Lampl stepped down from the head administrator role in early 2019 to return to full-time creative practice and pedagogical initiatives.

Lampl shifted his academic focus to designing pathways for student composers entering modern media markets. He currently serves as the academic Convenor of the Composition for Film and Video Games major at the ANU School of Music. Lampl established collaborations with digital media institutions such as the Academy of Interactive Entertainment, so composition students could orchestrate, mix, and record soundtracks directly alongside game designers and digital animators.

== Personal life ==
Lampl is married to Australian architect Maria Filardo. They live in Carwoola Australia.
