= Simply Deep =

Studio album by Kelly Rowland
- Released: October 22, 2002
- Recorded: June–August 2002
- Studios: Stankonia (Note: Track 6) (Atlanta); The Enterprise (Note: Track 13) (Burbank); Heeba Jeeba (Note: Track 9) (Los Angeles); Henson (Note: Tracks 1, 3 and 7) (Hollywood); Nature's Finest (Note: Track 8) (Los Angeles); Real MF (Note: Track 11) (Los Angeles); Record Plant (Note: Track 6) (Los Angeles); Audiovision (Note: Tracks 4 and 5) (Miami); 353 (Note: Track 14) (New York City); Sound on Sound (Note: Tracks 10 and 12) (New York City)
- Genres: Alternative pop; alternative rock; folk; R&B
- Length: 53:09
- Labels: Music World; Columbia
- Producers: Jovonn Alexander; BAM & Ryan; Anders Barrén; Big Bert; Anthony Dent; Dane Deviller; Chad Elliott; Damon Elliott; Mark J. Feist; Rob Fusari; Rich Harrison; Sean Hosein; Alonzo Jackson; Troy Johnson; Steve Kipner; Solange Knowles; Billy Mann; Jany Schella; Damon Sharpe

Kelly Rowland chronology
Simply Deep (2002)	Ms. Kelly (2007)

Singles from Simply Deep
- 1. "Stole" Released: September 21, 2002; 2. "Can't Nobody" Released: February 4, 2003; 3. "Train on a Track" Released: August 4, 2003

Simply Deep is the debut solo studio album by the American singer-songwriter Kelly Rowland. It was first released on October 22, 2002, by Columbia Records and Music World Entertainment. Initially expected to be released during the hiatus of her group Destiny's Child in 2003, recording of the album was accelerated after the success of the single "Dilemma", a collaboration with rapper Nelly. Predominantly an alternative pop, alternative rock, folk and R&B album, Simply Deep also incorporated elements of rock and dance music in its production and was largely produced within three weeks only, guest appearances on Simply Deep include Nelly, Solange Knowles and Joe Budden.

The album received generally mixed to lukewarm reviews from most music critics who called it a pleasant listen but found that it lacked ambition. While Simply Deep peaked at number 12 on the Billboard 200 and sold over 600,000 copies in the United States, it was regarded as a bigger commercial success abroad, where it topped the UK Albums Chart, reached the top five in Australia, Denmark, and Ireland, and singles such as "Stole" and "Can't Nobody" were released to stronger commercial success.

In late 2003, nearly a year after the album's initial release, Rowland embarked on her debut solo Simply Deeper Tour to promote the album in Europe. While Simply Deep established Rowland as a viable solo artist and, with worldwide sales of more than 2 million units, remains the biggest-selling album within her solo catalogue, the singer has expressed her dissatisfaction with the rushed and less thought out character of the album, though still being fond of the material that she had recorded for it.

== Background and development ==
Rowland launched her singing career with all-female R&B group Destiny's Child in the late 1990s. While recording their third studio album, Survivor, in late 2000, the band announced that members of the group would disband for a short period to produce solo albums in the coming years, which they hoped would boost interest in Destiny's Child. The idea of individual releases emanated from the group's manager, Mathew Knowles. With different types of music for each member to produce, the albums were not intended to compete on the charts as Destiny's Child's management strategically planned to stagger the release of each group member's album to maximize sales.

Michelle Williams became the first to release a debut solo album, Heart to Yours, in April 2002. Beyoncé Knowles debuted on the big screen, starring in the spy comedy film Austin Powers in Goldmember (2002), and started recording her solo debut Dangerously in Love (2003). Meanwhile, Rowland collaborated with American rapper Nelly on the song "Dilemma" as a solo artist. The song originally appeared on his album Nellyville (2002), and while it was initially not expected to be released as a single, it received a positive response from DJs and listeners and was eventually promoted to single status. Issued to major success, "Dilemma" became a worldwide number-one hit that year, allowing Rowland's label Columbia Records to advance the release date of Simply Deep from 2003 to late 2002.

== Recording and production ==
In order to capitalize on the success of "Dilemma," the ordering of Knowles and Rowland's albums was switched, leading to the postponement of Knowles's solo album Dangerously in Love to mid-2003 and the recording of Simply Deep being accelerated to summer 2002. Rowland who had previously signed on to star in Ronny Yu's slasher film Freddy vs. Jason and was expected to start filming in Vancouver in September 2002, was forced to complete the album within a month. The singer felt pressured by high expectations due to Destiny's Child and their huge success. She later revealed: "It was a challenge and I did that creatively and vocally. I was very nervous, but I came through with flying colors because of my family and, of course, Destiny's Child. There were days in the studio where I would run out, like, 'I'm frustrated! I don't wanna do this!' And they would calm me and tell me that everything was gonna be okay. I got through it because of them." Rowland eventually overcame her fears during the process as her newfound independence offered her an opportunity to branch out and try new things. In fact, she co-wrote three songs on the album and came up with the vocal arrangements for several tracks.

Columbia Records arranged for Rowland to record with a large group of previous collaborators, several of which had worked with Destiny's Child on their 2001 studio album Survivor, including producers Anthony Dent, Rob Fusari, Falonte Moore, Mark J. Feist, Jovonn Alexander, and Damon Elliott. In addition, she would work with Troy Johnson, Alonzo Jackson, Damon Sharpe, Billy Mann, Anders Barrén, and Jany Schella, and trio Steve Kipner, Dane Deviller, and Sean Hosein. Songwriter-producer Rich Harrison contributed "Can't Nobody," the first of many songs which he would produce for either Destiny's Child or the band's solo projects. Robert "Big Bert" Smith oversaw the production of "Love/Hate," a song co-written by his then-girlfriend, fellow singer Brandy. Solange Knowles, Beyoncé's younger sister, wrote and co-produced three songs on Simply Deep. Recording sessions for the album took place at several recording studios, including Studio 353, The Hit Factory and Sound-on-Sound Studio in New York City, Stankonia Recording Studio in Atlanta, Audio Vision Recording Studios in Miami Beach, and The Enterprise in Burbank, Henson Recording Studios and The Record Plant in Los Angeles, Heeba Jeeba Studios in Sherman Oaks and the Real FM Sound and Nature's Finest Studios in Hollywood.

== Music and lyrics ==
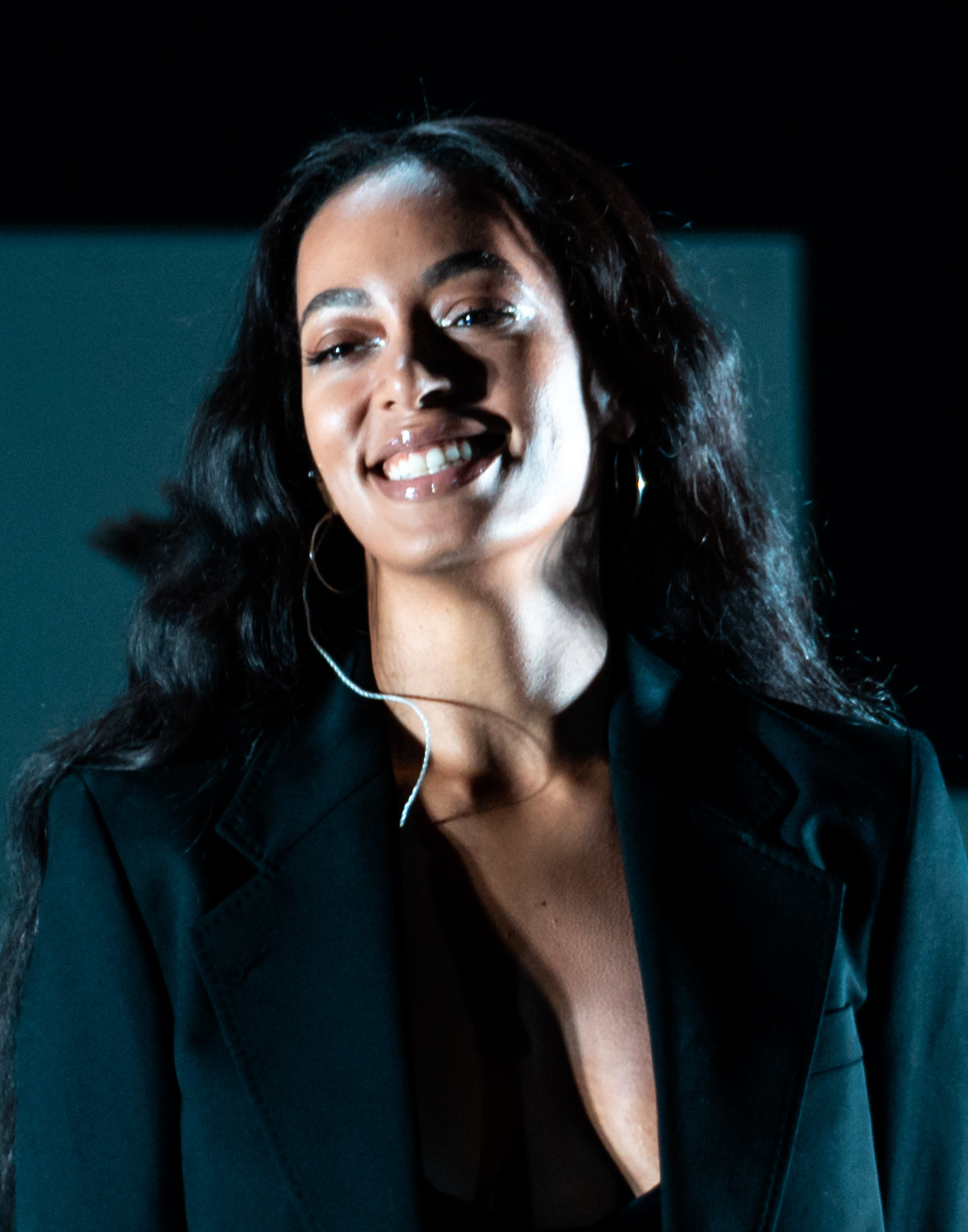
Beyoncé's sister Solange Knowles (pictured) co-wrote three tracks on Simply Deep.

Musically, Simply Deep marked a departure from Rowland's work with Destiny's Child, venturing into alternative sounds. Rowland herself described the album as a "weird fusion [of] a little bit of Sade and a little bit of rock," although she admitted that she felt the 'rock' label her record company used to promote it was somewhat inappropriate and misleading. According to her, the idea for her to "craft her own brand of Rock & R&B" came from her then-manager, Mathew Knowles, who recognized her interest in rock and alternative music. Rowland stated that she was enthusiastic about the idea, as she had not previously considered exploring such a combination of styles. In an Interview with Billboard, she commented: "He brought the idea to me and I was so excited because I never thought that I could do something like that."

While Williams and Knowles explored on gospel music and R&B songs, respectively, Rowland focused on recording alternative pop styles, with Simply Deep containing stinging electric guitars and gentle acoustic six-strings, atmospheric synths and turntable scratches, resulting in a sound characterized by rock and roll elements, confessional singer-songwriter sensibilities, sultry R&B, and an edgy undercurrent. Rowland's adoption of this style was a conscious effort to distinguish her solo work from the group's sound: "We wanted our solo albums to be different from Destiny's Child so that people wouldn’t compare them to the group’s work. The albums are an opportunity for people to get to know our personalities. In my case, I'm sure that most of my fans didn't realize how much I have always loved rock. In fact, when I first went into the studio and told the producers I wanted a mixture of Sade with really edgy rock, they looked at me like I was crazy! And honestly, about halfway through the recording process, even I was wondering if you could mix those influences together. But it all worked out wonderfully."

== Release and promotion ==
Simply Deep was released on October 28, 2002, in the United States and Canada through Columbia Records in collaboration with Music World Entertainment. The album saw its worldwide release on February 3, 2003. Although "Dilemma" was not technically a single from Simply Deep, it was recorded and released before Rowland began work on the album. The song received widespread critical acclaim, topped the charts in ten countries, including the United States, the United Kingdom, and Australia, and sold over 7.6 million copies worldwide. It became Rowland's first number-one single as a solo artist, her most successful single to date, and her biggest international hit.

Following the global success of "Dilemma," "Stole" was released as the album's official lead single in September 2002. The song reached the top 20 in most countries and peaked within the top five in Australia, Ireland, New Zealand, and the United Kingdom, where it remains Rowland's highest-charting solo single. Despite this, it was considered only a moderate success compared to "Dilemma." The album's second single, "Can't Nobody," performed less successfully, but reached the top-five in the United Kingdom and became a top-twenty hit in Australia, Denmark, Ireland, the Netherlands, and Scotland. Third and final single, "Train on a Track," achieved limited chart success, reaching the top 20 in the Netherlands and the United Kingdom, but received additional exposure through its inclusion in the romantic comedy films Maid in Manhattan and The Seat Filler.

== Critical reception ==
Professional ratings
Review scores
Source	Rating
AllMusic	3/5 stars
Blender	2/5 stars
The Guardian	3/5 stars
Houston Chronicle	C−
Los Angeles Times	3/4 stars
MTV Asia	8/10
Slant Magazine	2.5/5 stars
The Times	3/5 stars
Vibe	1.5/5 stars
Yahoo! Music UK	6/10

Upon its release, Simply Deep received generally mixed to lukewarm reviews from most music critics. British morning newspaper The Independent gave the album a generally favorable review, writing that "on the whole the album sticks closely to the standard urban-diva formula, mixing garage twitchers with the usual billing and cooing on ballads such as "Haven't Told You". But it's all done with style and intelligence, whether she's luxuriating in the loneliness of "Everytime You Walk Out That Door" or evoking the momentum of the first flush of love in "Train on a Track"." Lisa Verrico of The Times stated "on first listen, Simply Deep does everything but live up to its title. It sounds like a shallow stroll through the poppier end of urban music [...] But give it another listen and [it] does grow on you if you’re looking for an easy-on-the-ear album. It is a pleasant listen." Joy Dunbar, writing for BBC Music, noted that while "the albums main weakness is that it tries to offer too much diversity and Kelly tries too hard to stand outside her former incarnation," it was a must-have for fans of R&B music, adding: "Simply Deep endeavours to demonstrate another side of Kelly Rowland, as a songwriter and an independent solo artist [...] The in frequent high points make this a must for your collection."

In her review for Simply Deep, Caroline Sullivan of The Guardian wrote, "Rowland is no longer a mere backing vocalist for Beyoncé Knowles. But while she undoubtedly has talent to burn, her first solo album is a mildly disappointing setting for it. A top-flight example of the American inclination toward lush but lightweight soul, it makes all the right R&B noises without engaging the emotions." She gave it three out of five stars. Sal Cinquemani of Slant dismissed the ballads on Simply Deep as "all gloppy-goo and no soul; but through it all Rowland manages to keep her cool. The album's best tracks, the light and breezy "Train on a Track" and "(Love Lives In) Strange Places," infuse the singer's lush harmonies with acoustic guitars and poetic wordplay." He especially criticized Solange Knowles' contribution to the album, noting her "icky [and] laughable lyrics" as the worst on Simply Deep which he rated two and a half out of five stars. Jon Caramanica of Entertainment Weekly commented that "Rowland, at times, seems like Destiny's adopted child, never receiving a full helping of Knowles-family adulation. Alas, her first solo project doesn't pull her out from Beyonce's shadow. She needs added star power: Her backup-singer instincts leave even the hottest songs here feeling somewhat chilly." Craig Seymour of Vibe was generally disappointed with the album, writing: "Rowland's solo album marks an attempt to further establish herself as a singular talent, but the effort is as misguided as the Nelly hookup was savvy [...] An abundance of cheesy folk/R&B numbers make Rowland come off like Brandy fronting as India.Arie." Rolling Stone's Christian Hoard found that the album's "tired character sketches and polite R&B hooks will make you long for the sass and spirit of her main outfit."

== Accolades ==
"Dilemma" was nominated for Best Rap/Sung Collaboration and Record of the Year at the 45th Grammy Awards (2003), winning the award for Best Rap/Sung Collaboration. During the 55th Anniversary of the Hot 100 issue of Billboard magazine, the song was ranked at number 75 on the all-time Hot 100 songs, while at the end of 2009 was named the eleventh most successful song from 2000 to 2009, on the Billboard Hot 100 Songs of the Decade. "Dilemma" was accredited internationally with sixteen certifications.

Year	Award	Category	Nominee	Work	Result
2003	Grammy Award	Best Rap/Sung Collaboration	Kelly Rowland; Nelly	"Dilemma"	Won
2003	Grammy Award	Record of the Year	Kelly Rowland; Nelly	"Dilemma"	Nominated

== Commercial performance ==
Simply Deep debuted and peaked at number twelve on the Billboard 200, the official albums chart in the United States, on November 9, 2002, selling 77,000 units in its first week of release. It was this week's fourth-highest-charting entry after Santana's Shaman, Foo Fighter's One by One and Rod Stewart's It Had to Be You: The Great American Songbook. Simultaneously, the album also charted on the Billboard Top R&B/Hip-Hop Albums tally, reaching number three behind LL Cool J's 10 (2002) and Gerald Levert's The G Spot (2002). On December 5, 2002, Simply Deep was certified gold by the Recording Industry Association of America (RIAA) for shipments figures in excess of 500,000 copies. The album remains Rowland's best-selling album in the country to date. By August 2007, it had sold more than 600,000 copies domestically.

Released to even bigger success in international territories, in the United Kingdom, the album debuted at number-one on the UK Albums Chart on February 15, 2003, selling more than 100,000 copies in its first week. It received both a silver and a gold certification by the British Phonographic Industry (BPI) the following week, and on April 11, 2003, was certified platinum for sales of 300,000 units. Simply Deep also reached number two on the Irish Albums Chart, elsewhere in Europe, the album managed to enter the top ten in Denmark and the top twenty in Germany, the Netherlands, Norway, and Switzerland. Across Oceania, it placed fifth and seventh on the Australian and the New Zealand Albums Chart, in the week of January 26, 2003, and was certified gold by both the Australian Recording Industry Association (ARIA) and the Recording Industry Association of New Zealand (RIANZ). Worldwide, the album has sold over 2.5 million copies, making it Rowland's best-selling solo album to date.

== Track listing ==
Simply Deep – Standard edition
No.	Title	Writer(s)	Producer(s)	Length
1.	"Stole"	Steve Kipner; Dane Deviller; Sean Hosein	Kipner; Deviller; Hosein	4:09
2.	"Dilemma" (with Nelly)	Cornell Iral Haynes Jr.; Bunny Sigler; Kenny Gamble	BAM & Ryan	4:49
3.	"Haven't Told You"	Anders Barrén; Jany Schella; Jeanette Olsson	Barrén; Schella	3:42
4.	"Can't Nobody"	Rich Harrison; Robert Reed; Tony Fisher	Harrison	4:04
5.	"Love/Hate"	Brandy Norwood; Blake English; Robert Smith	Big Bert	3:08
6.	"Simply Deep" (featuring Solange)	Troy Johnson; Solange Knowles	Johnson; S. Knowles	3:22
7.	"(Love Lives In) Strange Places"	Kelly Rowland; Billy Mann; Damon Elliott	Mann; D. Elliott	3:32
8.	"Obsession"	Johnson; S. Knowles	Johnson; S. Knowles	3:36
9.	"Heaven"	Rowland; Taura Jackson; Alonzo Jackson; Todd Mushaw	A. Jackson	3:59
10.	"Past 12"	Rob Fusari; Mary Brown; Falonte Moore; Balewa Muhammad; Teron Beal; Eritza Lauds	Fusari; Moore; Beal^{[a]}	3:28
11.	"Everytime You Walk Out That Door"	Mark J. Feist; Damon Sharpe	Feist; Sharpe^{[b]}	4:08
12.	"Train on a Track"	Fusari; Tiaa Wells; Muhammad; Sylvester Jordan	Fusari; Wells^{[a]}; Jordan^{[a]}	3:43
13.	"Beyond Imagination"	S. Knowles; D. Elliott; Romeo Antonio	D. Elliott; S. Knowles	3:21
Total length:				53:09

Simply Deep – International edition (bonus track)
No.	Title	Writer(s)	Producer(s)	Length
14.	"Make U Wanna Stay" (featuring Joe Budden)	Rowland; Budden; Jovonn Alexander; Mathew Knowles; Chad Elliott; Winsome Mello Singh; Adeka "Dee" Stupart	C. Elliott; Alexander	4:09
Total length:				57:18

Simply Deep – European edition (bonus track)
No.	Title	Writer(s)	Producer(s)	Length
15.	"No Coincidence"	Fusari; Muhammad; Jordan	Fusari	3:45
Total length:				61:03

Simply Deep – European enhanced edition (bonus material)
No.	Title	Writer(s)	Director(s)	Length
16.	"Stole" (music video)	Kipner; Deviller; Hosein	Sanaa Hamri	4:12
Total length:				65:15

Simply Deep – Japanese edition (bonus tracks)
No.	Title	Writer(s)	Producer(s)	Length
15.	"No Coincidence"	Fusari; Muhammad; Jordan	Fusari; Jordan^{[a]}	3:45
16.	"What Would You Do"	André Benjamin; Anthony Dent; Antwan Patton; Keri Hilson	Dent	3:10
Total length:				64:13

Simply Deep – French and Australian edition (bonus tracks)
No.	Title	Writer(s)	Producer(s)	Length
15.	"Une femme en prison" (Stomy Bugsy featuring Kelly Rowland)	Boukhit Djamel; Gilles Duarte; Isabelle Nesmon; Dimitri Jamois	Maleko; Djam L	5:07
16.	"Stole" (H&D nu soul mix)	Kipner; Deviller; Hosein	Kipner; Deviller; Hosein; Hula and Dejion^{[c]}	3:01
17.	"No Coincidence"	Fusari; Muhammad; Jordan	Fusari; Jordan^{[a]}	3:45
Total length:				69:11

Notes

- ^{^[a]} signifies a vocal producer
- ^{^[b]} signifies a co-producer
- ^{^[c]} signifies a remix producer

Sample credits

- "Dilemma" contains elements from "Love, Need and Want You" (1983) as written by Bunny Sigler and Kenneth Gamble.
- "Can't Nobody" contains elements from "Let's Get Small" (1982) as written by Robert "Syke Dyke" Reed and Tony Fisher.

== Personnel ==
Credits are taken from the album's liner notes.

Managerial and imagery

- A&R – Teresa LaBarbera Whites
- Art direction – Fabiola Caceres, Ian Cuttler
- Marketing - Quincy S. Jackson
- Executive producers – Mathew Knowles, Kelly Rowland
- Photography – Isabel Snyder

Performance credits

- Vocals – Kelly Rowland
- Vocal assistance – Sherrie Ford, Jeanette Olsson

Instruments

- Acoustic guitar – Billy Mann
- Cello – Kati Raitinen, Peter Tornblom
- Electric guitar – Nick Moroch
- Guitar – Romeo Antonio, Mats Berntoft, Svein H. Martinsen, Isaac Phillips, Sergio Ponzo, Stanka Simeonova
- Viola – Tonstudio Bauer, Torbjorn Helander, Mikael Sjogren
- Bass – Mark J. Feist
- Drums – Mark J. Feist
- Violin – Christian Bergqvist, Ulrika Frankmar, Jan Isaksson, Roger Johnsson, Stanka Simeonova, Stanka Simeonova, Monika Stankkoliska

Technical and production

- Engineering – Blake English, Paul Falcone, John Frye, Franny G, Jaime Sickora, Spider, Kevin Thomas
- Engineering assistance – Jun Ishizeki, Flip Osman, Daniel Milazzo
- Mastering: Tom Coyne
- Mixing: Tony Maserati, Dave Pensado, Richard Travali
- Production – Anders Barrén, Dane Deviller, Mark J. Feist, Sean Hosein, Heeba Jeeba, Steve Kipner, Faltone Moore, Jany Schella, Damon Sharpe
- Vocal production – Teron Beal, Brandy Norwood, Kelly Rowland, Tiaa Wells

== Charts ==
=== Weekly charts ===
Weekly chart performance for Simply Deep
Chart (2002–03)	Peak position
Australian Albums (ARIA)	5
Australian Urban Albums (ARIA)	3
Austrian Albums (Ö3 Austria)	42
Belgian Albums (Ultratop Flanders)	33
Belgian Albums (Ultratop Wallonia)	47
Canadian Albums (Nielsen SoundScan)	30
Canadian R&B Albums (Nielsen SoundScan)	6
Danish Albums (Hitlisten)	5
Dutch Albums (Album Top 100)	16
European Top 100 Albums (Music & Media)	5
Finnish Albums (Suomen virallinen lista)	17
French Albums (SNEP)	47
German Albums (Offizielle Top 100)	14
Irish Albums (IRMA)	2
Italian Albums (FIMI)	50
Japanese Albums (Oricon)	48
New Zealand Albums (RMNZ)	7
Norwegian Albums (VG-lista)	14
Polish Albums (ZPAV)	21
Scottish Albums (Official Charts)	1
Swedish Albums (Sverigetopplistan)	32
Swiss Albums (Schweizer Hitparade)	17
UK Albums (Official Charts)	1
UK R&B Albums (Official Charts)	2
US Billboard 200	12
US Top R&B/Hip-Hop Albums (Billboard)	3

=== Year-end charts ===
2002 year-end chart performance for Simply Deep
Chart (2002)	Position
Canadian Albums (Nielsen SoundScan)	199
Canadian R&B Albums (Nielsen SoundScan)	36

2003 year-end chart performance for Simply Deep
Chart (2003)	Position
Australian Albums (ARIA)	51
Australian Urban Albums (ARIA)	12
Danish Albums (Hitlisten)	85
UK Albums (OCC)	41

== Certifications ==
Sales and certifications for Simply Deep
Region	Certification	Certified units/sales
Australia (ARIA)	Gold	35,000^{^}
Canada (Music Canada)	Gold	50,000^{^}
New Zealand (RMNZ)	Gold	7,500^{^}
South Korea	—	3,697
United Kingdom (BPI)	Platinum	300,000^{^}
United States (RIAA)	Gold	602,000
Summaries
Worldwide	—	2,500,000
^{^} Shipments figures based on certification alone.

== Release history ==
Simply Deep release history
Region	Date	Format(s)	Label(s)	Ref.
Australia	October 22, 2002	CD; digital download	Sony Music	
Canada	October 22, 2002	CD; digital download	Sony Music	
Italy	October 22, 2002	CD; digital download	Sony Music	
Mexico	October 22, 2002	CD; digital download	Sony Music	
United States	October 22, 2002	CD; digital download	Columbia; Music World	
Japan	January 22, 2003	CD; digital download	Sony Music	
Austria	February 3, 2003	CD; digital download	Sony Music	
France	February 3, 2003	CD; digital download	Sony Music	
Ireland	February 3, 2003	CD; digital download	Sony Music	
Germany	February 10, 2003	CD; digital download	Sony Music	

== See also ==
- List of UK Albums Chart number ones of the 2000s
