= Stole (song) =

2002 single by Kelly Rowland

Single by Kelly Rowland

from the album Simply Deep
- Released: September 9, 2002
- Recorded: 2002
- Studio: Henson (Hollywood, California)
- Genre: R&B; rock; alternative rock
- Length: 4:09
- Label: Columbia; Music World
- Songwriters: Dane Deviller; Sean Hosein; Steve Kipner
- Producers: Dane Deviller; Sean Hosein; Steve Kipner

Kelly Rowland singles chronology
"Dilemma" (2002)	"Stole" (2002)	"Can't Nobody" (2003)

Music video
- "Stole" on YouTube

"Stole" is a song by American singer Kelly Rowland. It was written and produced by Dane Deviller, Sean Hosein and Steve Kipner for Rowland's debut solo album Simply Deep (2002). An R&B/rock and alternative rock song, "Stole" describes the collateral effects of a school shooting. Following "Dilemma" (2002), Rowland's worldwide number-one hit with rapper Nelly, "Stole" was released as her official solo debut single as well as the album's lead single on September 9, 2002.

The song initially divided critics: some complimented the song's social commentary, and Rowland's vocal performance as well as her willingness to break away from the R&B sounds of Destiny's Child, while others criticized the musical direction and considered it an unusual single choice. A commercial success, "Stole" entered the top twenty on the majority of the charts it appeared on, reaching the top five in Australia, Ireland, New Zealand and the United Kingdom, where it remains one of her highest-charting solo singles to date. In the United States, it peaked at number 27 on the Billboard Hot 100.

Inspired by its lyrics, a music video for "Stole" was directed by Sanaa Hamri. In it, Rowland is portrayed as a narrator who comments on the deaths of two male teenagers and their impact on their schoolmates, particularly a female student who discovers that she is pregnant. In further promotion of the song, Rowland performed "Stole" on television shows such as The Tonight Show with Jay Leno, The Late Late Show with Craig Kilborn, CD:UK, and Top of the Pops and the TMF Awards. She also made it part of the setlist of her Simply Deeper Tour (2003) and further concert tours.

== Background ==
During recording their third album, Survivor (2001), Destiny's Child announced that members of the group would disband for a short period to produce solo albums in the coming years, which they hoped would boost interest to Destiny's Child. With different types of music for each member to produce, Kelly Rowland and her bandmates Beyoncé Knowles and Michelle Williams were not intended to compete on the charts, and thus, Destiny's Child's management strategically planned to stagger every year each member's album. Whilst Williams was the first to release a debut solo album, Heart to Yours (released in April 2002), the unexpected success of Rowland's collaboration with American rapper Nelly on the song "Dilemma" caused the label to advance the release date of her debut solo album, Simply Deep, to late 2002, replacing it with Knowles' solo debut Dangerously in Love (2003). As a result, Rowland was requested to rush the recording of the album within three weeks to get done, and as no time was left to produce any new material, "Stole"—as with many songs on the album—was selected out of Sony Music's song pool of demo tapes.

== Music and lyrics ==
A portion of the song's sheet music.

"Stole", written and produced by Dane Deviller, Sean Hosein and Steve Kipner, is a midtempo R&B/rock and alternative rock ballad. It is composed in the key of C major, and is in common time at ninety-six beats per minute. It is written in the common verse-chorus form and features four instruments: electric guitar, drums, guitar, and keyboards. Rowland's vocal range covers close to two octaves; she performs her highest pitch (D5) during the chorus, and her lowest pitch (E3) at the beginning of the verses. "Stole" is thematically a social commentary as well as a lament for unfulfilled potential.

When Rowland first heard “Stole,” she was immediately struck by the song. She later described it as “such a passionate song,” saying she loved both the lyrics and the melody. In an interview with CNN's The Music Room, she remarked: "It tells a story about each of their lives and what they go through and how their lives were taken away from them [...] I loved the song when I heard the lyrics and I hoped it would hopefully touch young people and inspire. I don't mean to sound preachy 'cos it's still got a great melody and a great musical feel behind it but it was just such a great song [...]."

== Critical reception ==
"Stole" received generally mixed reviews from music critics. AllMusic editor Jon O'Brien named the song one of the album's highlights along with "Can't Nobody", "Dilemma" and "Everytime You Walk Out That Door" and called it a "rock-tinged [...] emotive tale of school shootings and suicides." Caroline Sullivan of The Guardian found that the "silky" song emphasized that Rowland's "speciality is the slightly funky party number with a moralising overtone." Chuck Taylor from Billboard found that it was proving "that Rowland is willing to take a risk to prove a point [...] She will likely gain a whole new fan base with her combination of social commentary and impressive vocal talent." British morning newspaper The Independent called "Stole" Simply Deep's "strongest track [...] a lament for unfulfilled potential, especially that of smart kids victimised by dumb thug culture."

Lisa Verrico of The Times noted the song "tells stories of shattered dreams through a series of fictional characters, has a naggingly catchy chorus and [...] shows Rowland as a strong, smooth, versatile singer." BBC Music editor Joy Dunbar found that the "Sade-influenced "Stole" which is about universal life experiences highlights Kelly's soulful, spine tingling singing voice." The Torch's Frank DeBellis remarked that "Stole" is a "single that truly expresses Rowland’s talent and represents the sounds of the entire album." Less impressed, Houston Chronicle journalist Michael D. Clark felt that "with minimalist vibrato, [...] "Stole" tells the tragic stories of characters who never realize their dreams of stardom. The drama unfolds at the pace of Xanax." Vibe journalist Craig Seymour called "Stole" a "dreadfully overwrought first single."

== Commercial performance ==
The song was initially released in the United States on September 9, 2002, once the popularity of "Dilemma" began to fade. On September 28, 2002, the song debuted at number seventy-six on the US Billboard Hot 100, with former still remaining on number-one. It took another nine weeks until the single reached its peak position at number twenty-seven on November 30, 2002. It would remain Rowland's highest-charting single as a leading solo artist on the US Hot 100 until the release of her 2011 single "Motivation" (featuring Lil Wayne). More successful on Billboard's component charts, "Stole" reached the top twenty on the Top 40 Tracks and the Mainstream Top 40 charts, while its remixes peaked at number twenty-four on the Hot Dance Music/Club Play chart.

In Norway, it became Rowland's second top ten entry as a solo artist, debuting at number ten and peaking at number six the next week, and staying on the chart for nine weeks. In Switzerland, the single debuted on February 9, 2003, at number twenty-four and jumped to the twelfth position the next week, reaching a peak position of nine for a single week, and remaining on the chart for fifteen weeks. Scoring its highest-peaking position in Ireland and the United Kingdom, where it debuted at number three and two respectively, the song would remain Rowland's biggest-charting solo success Europe-wide until the release of her equally successful 2008 single "Work", excluding "Dilemma" and "When Love Takes Over" (with David Guetta). The song became Rowland's fifth best selling solo single in the United Kingdom with 210,000 copies being sold as of November 2011.

== Music video ==
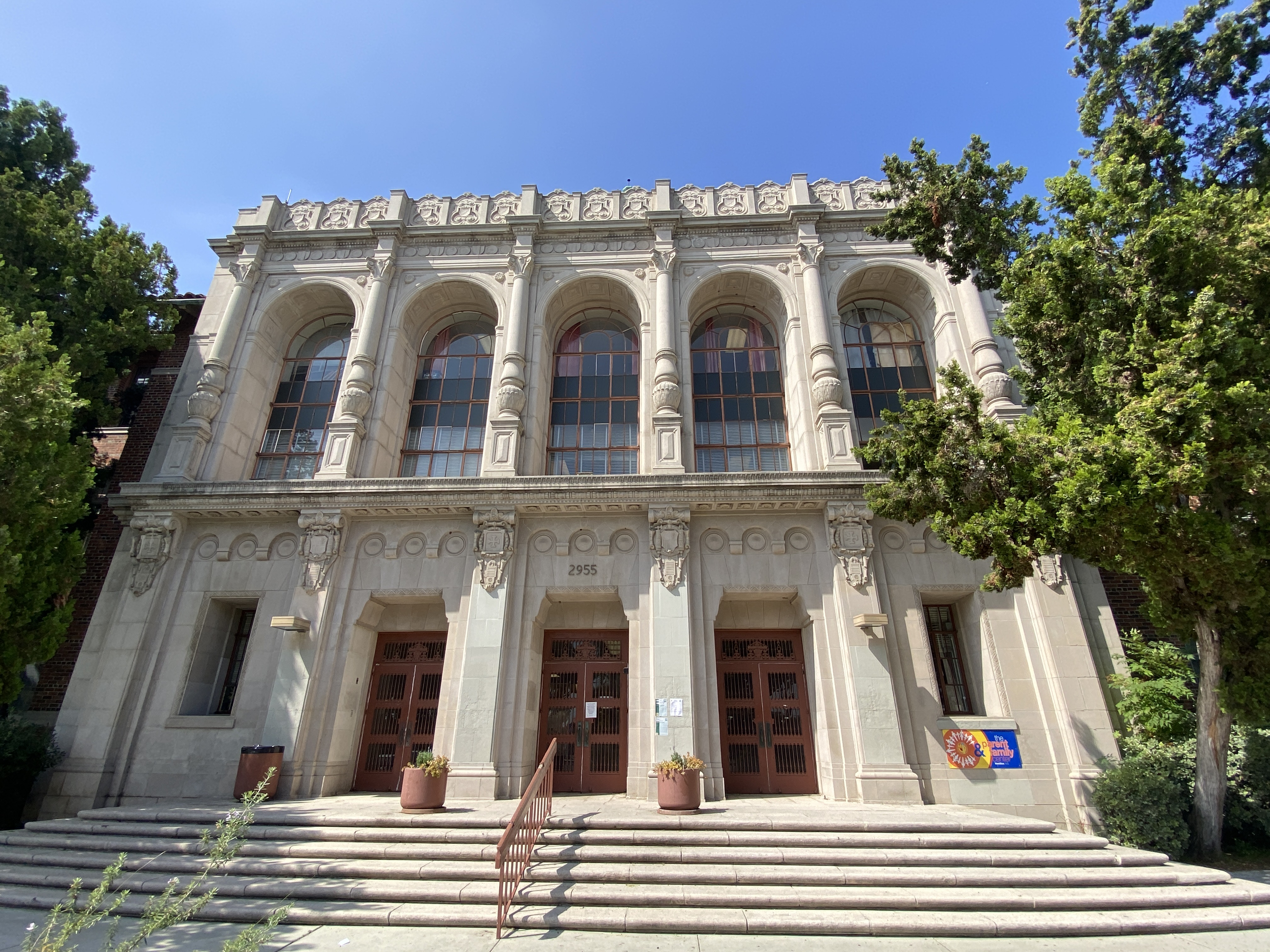
Portions of "Stole" were filmed at the Alexander Hamilton High School in Los Angeles (pictured).

A music video for "Stole" was filmed by Moroccan-American director Sanaa Hamri in Los Angeles, California in mid-2002 and depicts a group of students who have their lives stolen through teenager issues. With the song touching on the topic of school violence, portions of the visuals were shot at the Alexander Hamilton High School in the Castle Heights neighborhood within the Westside of Los Angeles. Production was helmed by Melissa Larsen for Anonymous Content, with Tina Knowles serving as Rowland's stylist. Filming was tracked by BET series Access Granted. Rowland is seen wearing a shirt that has a picture of rapper The Notorious B.I.G. on the left side and another picture of rapper Tupac Shakur on the right side.

In the clip, Rowland is seen acting as an unseen character singing to the audience, while explaining what is going on. The first scene is of Jonathan, a young man getting up to go to school, then he goes downstairs to see his sister and distraught mother with a black eye, who had obviously been beaten by his father. Thoroughly depressed, he goes to school, walks into one of the bathroom stalls and shoots himself. Mary, a girl who is an aspiring actress and is alluded to have known Jonathan, walks by and hears the shooting, goes into the bathroom, finds his body and calls the police. Rowland explains that after his death many of his classmates mentioned either never talking to the boy or treating him like an outsider. Another sequence of the video shows Mary going to a doctor's appointment and finding out that she is pregnant. As the song explains, that unexpectedly ends her once promising dream of movie stardom. Next we see a group of young boys on a basketball court, one boy in particular, Greg, who, as Rowland explains, dreamed of becoming a star basketball player. Then the boys glance over at a group of their classmates, obviously not on good terms, then Greg is shot and dies. Mary is later seen with her newborn child, writing "Think before you act" on a class mural dedicated to the two deceased boys.

== Track listings ==
US CD single
No.	Title	Writer(s)	Producer(s)	Length
1.	"Stole" (Pop Edit)	Dane Deviller; Sean Hosein; Steve Kipner	Deviller; Hosein; Kipner	3:55
2.	"Stole" (D. Elliott Dreambrotha Mix)	Deviller; Hosein; Kipner	Deviller; Hosein; Kipner; Damon Elliott^{[a]}	3:55

International CD single
No.	Title	Writer(s)	Producer(s)	Length
1.	"Stole" (Album Version)	Deviller; Hosein; Kipner	Deviller; Hosein; Kipner	4:10
2.	"Stole" (Pop Edit)	Deviller; Hosein; Kipner	Deviller; Hosein; Kipner	3:56
3.	"Stole" (D. Elliott Dreambrotha Mix)	Deviller; Hosein; Kipner	Deviller; Hosein; Kipner; Elliott^{[a]}	3:57
4.	"Stole" (H&D Nu Soul Mix)	Deviller; Hosein; Kipner	Deviller; Hosein; Kipner; Hula & Dejion^{[a]}	3:04
5.	"Stole" (Maurice's Nu Soul Mix)	Deviller; Hosein; Kipner	Deviller; Hosein; Kipner; Maurice Joshua^{[a]}	7:41

European CD single
No.	Title	Writer(s)	Producer(s)	Length
1.	"Stole" (Album Version)	Deviller; Hosein; Kipner	Deviller; Hosein; Kipner	4:10
2.	"Stole" (The Gladiator Remix)	Deviller; Hosein; Kipner	Deviller; Hosein; Kipner; Ron G.^{[a]}	3:56
3.	"Stole" (D. Elliott Dreambrotha Mix)	Deviller; Hosein; Kipner	Deviller; Hosein; Kipner; Elliott^{[a]}	3:57
4.	"Stole" (Maurice's Nu Soul Mix)	Deviller; Hosein; Kipner	Deviller; Hosein; Kipner; Joshua^{[a]}	7:41
5.	"Stole" (Bear Who? Nu DnB Mix)	Deviller; Hosein; Kipner	Deviller; Hosein; Kipner; Bear Who^{[a]}	7:05
6.	"Stole" (Music video)			3:56

UK 12-inch promo
No.	Title	Writer(s)	Producer(s)	Length
1.	"Stole" (H&D Nu Soul Mix)	Deviller; Hosein; Kipner	Deviller; Hosein; Kipner; Hula & Dejion^{[a]}	3:04
2.	"Stole" (Album Version)	Deviller; Hosein; Kipner	Deviller; Hosein; Kipner	4:10
3.	"Stole" (Azza New Soul Mix)	Deviller; Hosein; Kipner	Deviller; Hosein; Kipner; Azza Singers^{[a]}	4:32
4.	"Stole" (D. Elliott Dreambrotha Mix)	Deviller; Hosein; Kipner	Deviller; Hosein; Kipner; Elliott^{[a]}	3:57

UK CD1 single
No.	Title	Writer(s)	Producer(s)	Length
1.	"Stole" (Album Version)	Deviller; Hosein; Kipner	Deviller; Hosein; Kipner	4:10
2.	"Stole" (Azza New Soul Mix)	Deviller; Hosein; Kipner	Deviller; Hosein; Kipner; Singers^{[a]}	4:32
3.	"Simply Deep" (featuring Solange Knowles)	Troy Johnson; Solange Knowles	Johnson; Knowles	3:22
4.	"Stole" (Music video)			3:56

UK CD2 single (The Club Remixes)
No.	Title	Writer(s)	Producer(s)	Length
1.	"Stole" (Album Version)	Deviller; Hosein; Kipner	Deviller; Hosein; Kipner; Colin Bassett; Tony Bean	4:10
2.	"Stole" (H&D Nu Soul Mix)	Deviller; Hosein; Kipner	Deviller; Hosein; Kipner; Hula & Dejion^{[a]}	3:04
3.	"Stole" (The Gladiator Remix)	Deviller; Hosein; Kipner	Deviller; Hosein; Kipner; Ron G.^{[a]}	3:56

Notes

- ^{^a} denotes additional producer

== Credits and personnel ==
Credits adapted from the liner notes of Simply Deep.

- Dane Deviller – writing, production, programming, arrangement, guitar
- Sherree Ford – backing vocals, vocal arrangement
- Sean Hosein – writing, production, programming, arrangement
- Steve Kipner – writing, production, programming, arrangement
- Kelly Rowland – lead vocals
- Spider – engineering
- Dave "Hard Drive" Pensado – mixing
- Ethan Willoughby – mixing assistance

== Charts ==
=== Weekly charts ===
Weekly chart performance for "Stole"
Chart (2002–2003)	Peak position
Australia (ARIA)	2
Australian Urban (ARIA)	2
Austria (Ö3 Austria Top 40)	24
Belgium (Ultratop 50 Flanders)	17
Belgium (Ultratip Bubbling Under Wallonia)	1
Croatia (HRT)	10
Denmark (Tracklisten)	7
Eurochart Hot 100 (Billboard)	5
Finland (Suomen virallinen lista)	11
France (SNEP)	53
Germany (GfK)	15
Ireland (IRMA)	3
Italy (FIMI)	12
Netherlands (Dutch Top 40)	8
Netherlands (Single Top 100)	10
New Zealand (Recorded Music NZ)	3
Norway (VG-lista)	6
Scottish Singles Sales (Official Charts)	3
Sweden (Sverigetopplistan)	14
Switzerland (Schweizer Hitparade)	9
UK Singles (Official Charts)	2
UK Hip Hop/R&B (Official Charts)	1
US Billboard Hot 100	27
US Dance Singles Sales (Billboard) Remixes	24
US Hot R&B/Hip-Hop Songs (Billboard)	54
US Pop Airplay (Billboard)	9
US Rhythmic Airplay (Billboard)	21

=== Year-end charts ===
2002 year-end chart performance for "Stole"
Chart (2002)	Position
US Mainstream Top 40 (Billboard)	91
US Rhythmic Top 40 (Billboard)	92

2003 year-end chart performance for "Stole"
Chart (2003)	Position
Australia (ARIA)	12
Australian Urban (ARIA)	7
Ireland (IRMA)	29
Netherlands (Dutch Top 40)	51
Netherlands (Single Top 100)	89
New Zealand (RIANZ)	43
Switzerland (Schweizer Hitparade)	96
UK Singles (OCC)	30
UK Urban (Music Week)	37
US Mainstream Top 40 (Billboard)	82

== Certifications ==
Certifications for "Stole"
Region	Certification	Certified units/sales
Australia (ARIA)	Platinum	70,000^{^}
New Zealand (RMNZ)	Gold	7,500^{*}
United Kingdom (BPI)	Gold	400,000^{‡}
^{*} Sales figures based on certification alone.^{^} Shipments figures based on certification alone.^{‡} Sales+streaming figures based on certification alone.

== Release history ==
Release dates and formats for "Stole"
Region	Date	Format(s)	Label(s)	Ref(s).
United States	September 9, 2002	Urban contemporary radio	Columbia	
United States	September 10, 2002	Contemporary hit radio; rhythmic contemporary radio	Columbia	
United States	October 29, 2002	12-inch vinyl; CD	Columbia	
Japan	November 27, 2002	Maxi CD	Sony Music Japan	
Australia	December 2, 2002	Maxi CD	Sony Music	
Germany	January 27, 2003	Maxi CD	Sony Music	
United Kingdom	January 27, 2003	12-inch vinyl; maxi CD	Columbia	
France	February 24, 2003	CD	Columbia	
