= Danny Clarke =

British horticulturist

Dannahue Barrington Clarke is a British garden designer and television presenter who for two seasons co-hosted the BBC series The Instant Gardener with Helen Skelton (2015 -2016). He has also been part of the presenting team for Channel 5’s Filthy Garden SOS (2021) and ITV’s Alan Titchmarsh’s Love Your Garden (2021– 2023). In 2026 he contributed to Channel 5’s When Garden Makeovers Go Horribly Wrong

== Early life and education ==
Clarke was born in Oxford to parents who immigrated from Jamaica. Because his father was in the British military Clarke’s childhood was very transient and as a result moved around from country to country while growing up. After spending many years as a direct salesperson he decided to choose horticulture as a career change by becoming a garden maintenance practitioner and designer.

Clarke studied garden design at Hadlow College.

== Career ==
Clarke founded his own garden design company in 1997, and called it Barrington Suzy Garden Design. In 2014 he changed the name to The Black Gardener after noting that another businessman calling himself the Black Farmer was having success. The name led to him being noticed and invited to screen test for The Instant Gardener, a daytime BBC programme that ran for two seasons in 2015 and 2016.

He also appeared as a presenter for the BBC on the RHS Chelsea and RHS Tatton Flower shows.

He appeared on Tree of the Year for Channel 4 in 2016.

In 2019 he joined the ITV This Morning team creating colourful and creative garden transformations.

Clarke has also been seen as a presenter on The BBC Welsh Show, an edition of BBC’s Inside Out concerning land for allotments and ITV’s Tonight programme giving sustainability advice.

Clarke has appeared as a contestant on BBC game shows such as Celebrity Mastermind (2016), Celebrity Eggheads (2017), Pointless Celebrities (2023), Celebrity The Weakest Link (2024) and up-cycling programme Celebrity Money for Nothing (2017).

Clarke was commissioned in 2021 by Gloucester Royal Hospital to design and construct a Covid Memorial Garden in honour of the doctors, nurses and staff who showed bravery on the pandemics frontline. The garden was opened by HRH Princess Anne later that year.

Clarke in 2022 was a guest on BBC’s The One Show which was transmitted from Buckingham Palace. He was enlisted by the Woodland Trust to persuade the viewers to plant trees in their gardens to celebrate the queens platinum jubilee year.

In 2023, a prestigious David Austin English shrub rose called 'Dannahue' was named after him, for his contribution to community gardening and charity. A percentage of the proceeds from the sale were donated to Grow To Know a not-for-profit he co-directs with gardening activist Tayshan Hayden-Smith. The charitable organisation supports horticulture within diverse communities.

In 2022 Grow To Know were awarded a silver guilt medal at RHS Chelsea Flower Show for their “Hands off Mangrove” by Grow To Know show garden.

Clarke and the “Dannahue” rose featured prominently in a New York Times article in 2023.

Clarke in 2025 was the subject of a lifestyle article in the Financial Times

Clarke, in memory of his sister Margot, who died from a brain tumour in 2012, is a proud patron of the Brain Tumour Research charity. He also holds ambassadorial positions with the Woodland Trust, Queens Green Canopy and the National Garden Scheme (NGS).

In September 2026 Clarke through his work championing diversity and encouraging a new generation to connect with the natural world was conferred as a Honorary Fellow of the Royal Agricultural University (RAU) in Cirencester.
