= Can't Nobody (Kelly Rowland song) =

2003 single by Kelly Rowland

Single by Kelly Rowland

from the album Simply Deep
- Released: January 21, 2003
- Recorded: 2002
- Studio: The Hit Factory (New York City, New York)
- Genre: Dance-pop; R&B
- Length: 4:04
- Label: Columbia; Music World
- Songwriters: Rich Harrison; Robert "Syke Dyke" Reed; Tony Fisher
- Producer: Rich Harrison

Kelly Rowland singles chronology
"Stole" (2002)	"Can't Nobody" (2003)	"Train on a Track" (2003)

Music video
- "Can't Nobody" on YouTube

"Can't Nobody" is a song performed by American recording artist Kelly Rowland. It was written and produced by Rich Harrison for Rowland's solo debut album Simply Deep (2002). The song is built around a sample of "Let's Get Small" (1982) by American R&B band Trouble Funk. Due to the inclusion of the sample, band members Robert "Syke Dyke" Reed and Tony Fisher are also credited as songwriters. Musically, the uptempo track has been described as an "airy hip hop funk" song, that has Rowland describing an infatuation as she tries to convince the object of desire of her charms and advantages.

The song was released as the second single from Simply Deep on January 21, 2003, following lead "Stole" and Rowland's duet single "Dilemma" with Nelly from his album Nellyville (2002). While it widely failed to match the success of its predecessors, "Can't Nobody" reached the top-five in the United Kingdom and became a top-twenty hit in Australia, Denmark, Ireland, the Netherlands, and Scotland. In the US, the song entered Billboard's Mainstream Top 40. An accompanying music video was directed by Benny Boom and shot in Los Angeles, California in January 2003. In further promotion of the song, Rowland performed the song on television shows such as Top of the Pops and made it part of the setlist of her Simply Deeper Tour (2003).

== Background ==
After the release of her former group Destiny's Child's 2001 album Survivor, Rowland launched a solo career when American rapper Nelly asked her to appear as a featured artist on his song "Dilemma". The record originally appeared on his album Nellyville (2002) and was released as its third single. An instant success, it became a worldwide number-one hit that year and prompted Rowland's label Columbia Records to advance the release date of her solo album from 2003 to late 2002 to capitalize on the success of "Dilemma". Rowland was forced to complete the album within a month. "Can't Nobody" was written by producer and songwriter Rich Harrison. Known for his work on fellow Columbia Records signee Amerie's debut album All I Have (2002), the song marked his first collaboration with a Destiny's Child member. In contrast to his own production style and major parts of Simply Deep, which featured mid-tempo tracks and wide influences by pop and rock music, the track includes a beat driven but poppy and radio-friendly instrumental, involving elements from "Let's Get Small", a song written by Robert Reed and Tony Fisher and performed by Trouble Funk.

== Critical reception ==
"Can't Nobody" received generally mixed reviews from music critics. AllMusic editor Jon O'Brien named the song one of the album's highlights along with "Stole", "Dilemma" and "Everytime You Walk Out That Door" and complimented the production on "Can't Nobody" due to its "clattering percussion". Chuck Taylor from Billboard found that "while the single has its charms, its skittish production and overly busy chorus tend to grate after a few spins, limiting its chances to go to the long haul." Sal Cinquemani of Slant compared the song to Rowland's previous single "Dilemma" and wrote: "'Can’t Nobody' features a catchy, retro hook and slick production, but Rowland’s voice isn’t as powerful as Whitney Houston’s or even Beyoncé Knowles's." Vibe journalist Craig Seymour named "Can’t Nobody" one of the better tracks on Simply Deep, calling it "a morsel of airy hip hop funk [...] But while the tune offers her a good rump-wiggling groove, it can't quite fill the need for an authentic identity."

== Commercial performance ==
The song was first issued as the album's second single in the United States on January 21, 2003. However, "Can't Nobody" received little commercial response in Rowland's native, where it was less successful than previous single "Stole", debuting and peaking at number ninety-seven on the US Billboard Hot 100 and number seventy-two on Billboard's Hot R&B/Hip-Hop Songs, respectively. It also entered the US Mainstream Top 40, reaching number forty. The single fared better overseas, where it became Rowland's third consecutive top five hit on the UK Singles Chart, peaking at number five, as well as her ninth best-selling solo single as of November 2011. The song also entered the top ten of the Scottish Singles Chart, reaching number nine, and peaked within the top twenty in Denmark, Ireland, and the Netherlands. In Australia, "Can't Nobody" peaked at number thirteen and was eventually certified gold by the Australian Recording Industry Association (ARIA), indicating sales in excess of 35,000 copies.

== Music video ==
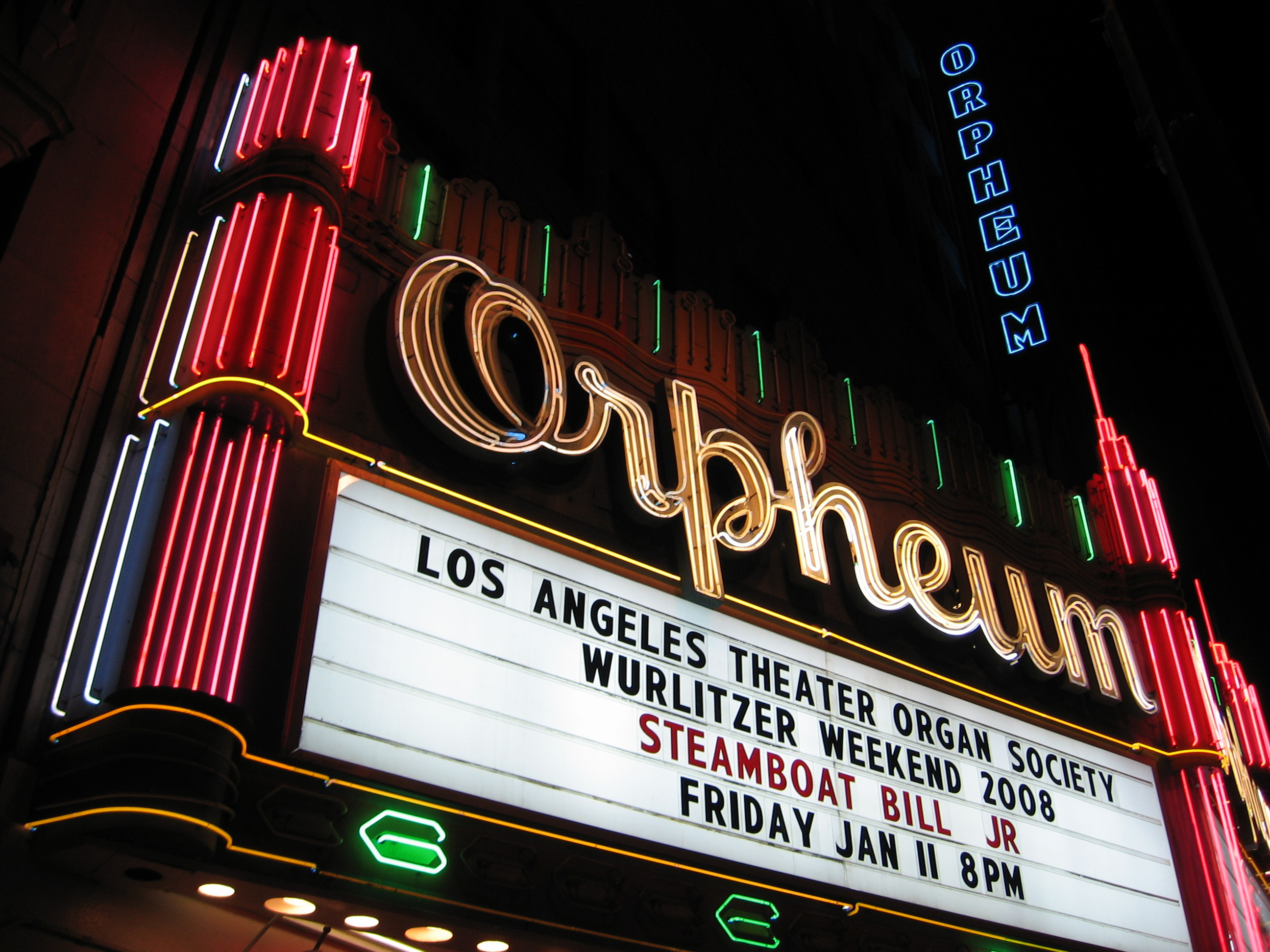
The music video for "Can't Nobody" was filmed at the Orpheum Theatre in Los Angeles (pictured).

Rowland reteamed with "Dilemma" director Benny Boom to craft a music video for "Can't Nobody" which was shot in Los Angeles, California at the weekend of January 4, 2003. Filming locations include the Orpheum Theatre on Broadway and the Chinatown neighborhood, both set in the Downtown Los Angeles district. Joe Oz served as first assistant director, while production was helmed by Veronica Zelle for now defunct Gorilla Flix Productions. Main camera was operated by Paul Cameron. Upon its release, the music video for "Can't Nobody" was included on the European maxi-single as an enhanced video element. It was later also included on the Japanese edition of Destiny's Child's Destiny's Child World Tour concert DVD, released in 2003, as well as the 2004 Wal-Mart exclusive limited Destiny's Child's Fan Pack DVD which was released a week before the release of Destiny Fulfilled (2004).

In the video, Rowland is waiting outside of the Orpheum Theatre nightclub for her boyfriend, who is surprising her with tickets for a fictional Simply Deep musical. She arrives after her boyfriend leaves and after buying a ticket for the musical and waiting for him to meet her, she is disturbed upon seeing a hologram of the two of them waiting in line together. Frustrated, Rowland walks around the Chinatown neighborhood seeing couples all around her until she comes across the Grand Star Jazz Club. She enters the club and begins enjoying herself while dancing until she sees her boyfriend nearby. She confronts him over his absence at the theatre, and he reveals he was going to surprise her with tickets to the musical. Rowland is relieved and after the two laugh over the misunderstanding, they both proceed to dance together in the club. The video ends with the two leaving the club to go watch the musical at the theatre. In a report surrounding the production of the short film, MTV News noted that the video was "a take-off of the Christian Slater flick True Romance."

== Track listings ==
International CD single 1

1. "Can't Nobody" (Album Version)
2. "Can't Nobody" (Cedsolo HipHop Remix)
3. "Can't Nobody" (featuring Lil' Flip)
4. "Can't Nobody" (featuring Jakk Frost)
5. "Can't Nobody" (Silk-Mix.com 80's HipHop-Flava 12)
6. "Can't Nobody" (Video)

International CD single 2

1. "Can't Nobody" (Radio Edit)
2. "Can't Nobody" (Silkmix House Mix Pt. 1&2 Edit)
3. "Can't Nobody" (Maurice's Nu Soul Mix Edit)
4. "Can't Nobody" (Charlie's Nu Soul Mix)

Australian CD single

1. "Can't Nobody" (Radio Edit)
2. "Can't Nobody" (featuring Jakk Frost)
3. "Can't Nobody" (featuring Lil' Flip)
4. "Can't Nobody" (Silk-Mix.com Retro House Remix)
5. "Can't Nobody" (Silk-Mix.com 80's HipHop-Flava 12)

UK CD single 1

1. "Can't Nobody"
2. "Can't Nobody" (Cedsolo Hip Hop Remix)
3. "Stole" (La Nu Soul Mix)
4. "Can't Nobody" (Video)

UK CD single 2

1. "Can't Nobody" (Album Version)
2. "Can't Nobody" (Silxmix.com House Mix Pt 1&2 Edit)
3. "Can't Nobody" (Maurice's Nu Soul Mix Edit)
4. "Can't Nobody" (Charlie's Nu Soul Mix)

UK cassette single

1. "Can't Nobody" (Album Version)
2. "Can't Nobody" (Feat. Jakk Frost)

US CD promo

1. "Can't Nobody" (Radio Edit)
2. "Can't Nobody" (Instrumental)
3. "Can't Nobody" (A capella)

US 12-inch single

Side A

1. "Can't Nobody" (Album Version)
2. "Can't Nobody" (Instrumental)
3. "Cant' Nobody" (A Capella)
4. "Can't Nobody" (Maurice's Nu Soul Mix)

Side B

1. "Can't Nobody" (Charlie's Nu Soul Mix)
2. "Can't Nobody" (Charlie's Nu Soul Mix Instrumental)
3. "Can't Nobody" (Azza's Nu Soul Mix)

US 12-inch single promo

Side A

1. "Can't Nobody" (Album Version)
2. "Can't Nobody" (Instrumental)
3. "Cant' Nobody" (A Capella)

Side B

1. "Can't Nobody" (Album Version)
2. "Can't Nobody" (Instrumental)
3. "Cant' Nobody" (A Capella)

US 12-inch Hot Urban Mixes promo

Side A

1. "Can't Nobody" (Silk-Mix.com 80's HipHop-Flava 12)
2. "Can't Nobody" (Silk-Mix.com 80's HipHop-Flava 12 Instrumental)
3. "Can't Nobody" (Album Instrumental)

Side B

1. "Can't Nobody" (featuring Lil' Flip)
2. "Can't Nobody" (featuring Jakk Frost)
3. "Can't Nobody" (featuring Jakk Frost A Capella)

US 12-inch Hot Dance Mixes promo

Side A

1. "Can't Nobody" (SilkMix.com House Mix Pt. 1 & 2)

Side B

1. "Can't Nobody" (SilkMix.com Retro-House Remix)
2. "Can't Nobody" (SilkMix.com Retro-House Instrumental)

UK 12-inch single

Side A

1. "Can't Nobody" (Album Version)
2. "Can't Nobody" (Cedsolo Hip Hop Remix)
3. "Can't Nobody" (Cedsolo Hip Hop Remix Instrumental)

Side B

1. "Can't Nobody" (featuring Jakk Frost)
2. "Can't Nobody" (featuring Lil' Flip)
3. "Can't Nobody" (Album Instrumental)

== Credits and personnel ==
Credits adapted from the liner notes of Simply Deep.

- Kelly Rowland – vocals
- Rich Harrison – writing, production, instruments
- Paul Falcone – recording
- Dan Milazzo – mixing assistance, recording assistance
- Tony Maserati – mixing
- Matt Snedeckor – mixing assistance
- Liz Graner – project coordination

== Charts ==
=== Weekly charts ===
Chart (2003)	Peak position
Australia (ARIA)	13
Australian Urban (ARIA)	8
Belgium (Ultratop 50 Flanders)	46
Belgium (Ultratop 50 Wallonia)	40
Denmark (Tracklisten)	18
European Hot 100 Singles (Billboard)	17
Germany (GfK)	66
Ireland (IRMA)	15
Netherlands (Dutch Top 40)	16
Netherlands (Single Top 100)	24
New Zealand (Recorded Music NZ)	38
Scotland Singles (OCC)	9
Switzerland (Schweizer Hitparade)	37
UK Singles (OCC)	5
UK Hip Hop/R&B (OCC)	3
US Billboard Hot 100	97
US Hot R&B/Hip-Hop Songs (Billboard)	72
US Pop Airplay (Billboard)	40

=== Year-end charts ===
Chart (2003)	Position
UK Singles (OCC)	153

== Certifications ==
Region	Certification	Certified units/sales
Australia (ARIA)	Gold	35,000^{^}
^{^} Shipments figures based on certification alone.

== Release history ==
Release dates and formats for "Can't Nobody"
Region	Date	Format(s)	Label(s)	Ref.
United States	January 21, 2003	Rhythmic contemporary radio; urban contemporary radio	Columbia	
Australia	April 14, 2003	Maxi CD	Sony Music	
France	April 22, 2003	Maxi CD	Columbia	
United Kingdom	April 28, 2003	Cassette; two maxi CDs	Columbia	
