= Tayshan Hayden-Smith =

English footballer

Tayshan Sami Hayden-Smith (born 23 September 1996) is an English footballer and gardener. He plays as a midfielder for Bedfont Sports. Born in England, he is a Cascadia international. Besides England, he has played in Austria and Cyprus. He previously played for Grenfell Athletic.

== Early life ==
Tayshan Hayden-Smith was born on 23 September 1996 to an Egyptian-Kuwaiti mother and a Jamaican-Italian father, grew up in Ladbroke Grove, West London and attended Fox Primary School in the Royal Borough of Kensington and Chelsea.

== Football ==
=== Club career ===
Before the second half of 2016–17, Hayden-Smith signed for Austrian fourth tier side FC Kitzbühel, helping them win the league, but left due to the Grenfell Tower fire in England.

=== International career ===
Hayden-Smith is eligible to represent Kuwait, Jamaica, Italy, and Egypt internationally, as well as England.

== Gardening ==
Hayden-Smith also works as a gardener and activist. In the aftermath of the Grenfell Tower fire, he started a local community garden called the Grenfell Garden of Peace. In 2020, he founded the non-profit Grow to Know with horticulturalist Danny Clarke. Hayden-Smith published a gardening book Small Space Revolution in 2024.

In January 2025, it was announced that Tayshan is an ambassador for the National Trust.

== Bibliography ==
- Small Space Revolution: Planting Seeds of Change in Your Community (2024)
