= Duane Martin =

American actor (born 1965)

- Martin (left) in 2004
- Born: August 11, 1965 (age 61); New York City, U.S.
- Education: New York University
- Occupation: Actor
- Years active: 1991–present
- Spouse: Tisha Campbell (m. 1996; div. 2020)
- Partner: Ashley Marie Jones (2023–present)
- Children: 2

Duane Martin (born August 11, 1965) is an American actor. He began his career making appearances on numerous television sitcoms before starring as Robert James on the UPN/CW sitcom All of Us (2003–2007) and as Detective Ben Baines on the police-procedural series L.A.'s Finest. Martin has also appeared in many films throughout his career including White Men Can't Jump (1992), Above the Rim and The Inkwell (both in 1994), The Faculty and Woo (both in 1998), Deliver Us from Eva and Ride or Die (both in 2003), and The Seat Filler (2004).

== Early life and education ==
Martin was born in the Brooklyn borough of New York City and graduated from New York University. He played NCAA Division III basketball at NYU and was signed as an undrafted free agent to a non-guaranteed contract in the National Basketball Association (NBA) with the New York Knicks in 1989. However, he was soon cut and never actually played in the NBA.

== Career ==
Martin's early television work includes an appearance on the NBC comedy series Out All Night, starring Patti LaBelle, Vivica A. Fox and Morris Chestnut. He also appeared in the music video for Boyz II Men's 1994 song "I'll Make Love to You". In 1998, Martin was a cast member of the short-lived Fox sitcom Getting Personal, with Vivica A. Fox and Jon Cryer. From 2003 to 2007, he portrayed TV reporter Robert James on the UPN/CW sitcom All of Us. Acting alongside his then-wife Tisha Campbell, he had a recurring role as Chuck on the sitcom Rita Rocks (2009). He later played Fernando on The Paul Reiser Show (2011).

Martin's notable feature film roles include Willie in White Men Can't Jump (1992), Jr. Philips in The Inkwell (1994), and Kyle Lee Watson in Above the Rim (1994). In the romantic comedy film The Seat Filler (2004), he starred as Derrick Harver, a law student who falls in love with a celebrity. Martin plays himself in the BET comedy series Real Husbands of Hollywood. In 2017, he portrayed Louil Silas, Jr. in the television miniseries The New Edition Story.

== Personal life ==
Martin met actress Tisha Campbell in 1990. The couple wed on August 17, 1996, and have two sons. In February 2018, Campbell filed for divorce, which was finalized in December 2020.

In February 2024, Martin announced he was engaged to model Ashley Marie Jones.

== Filmography ==
=== Film ===
| Year | Title | Role | Notes |
|---|---|---|---|
| 1992 | White Men Can't Jump | Willie Lewis | |
| 1994 | Above the Rim | Kyle Lee Watson | |
| 1994 | The Inkwell | Jr. Phillips | |
| 1996 | Down Periscope | Jefferson 'Stoneball' Jackson | |
| 1997 | Fakin' da Funk | Brandon | |
| 1997 | Scream 2 | Joel | |
| 1998 | Woo | Frankie | |
| 1998 | The Faculty | Officer #1 | |
| 1999 | Mutiny | B.J. Teach | TV movie |
| 1999 | Any Given Sunday | Willie's Agent, “Wayne” | |
| 2003 | Deliver Us from Eva | Michael 'Mike' | |
| 2003 | What Boys Like | Phil | |
| 2003 | Ride or Die | Conrad 'Rad' McRae | Video |
| 2004 | The Seat Filler | Derrick | |
| 2011 | Still Screaming: The Ultimate Scary Movie Retrospective | Himself | Documentary film |
| 2015 | Sister Code | Duane Shakir | |

=== Television ===
| Year | Title | Role | Notes |
|---|---|---|---|
| 1991 | Against the Law | - | Episode: "Hoops" |
| 1992 | Roc | Kenny | Episode: "All That Jazz" |
| 1992 | CBS Schoolbreak Special | Jordan | Episode: "Different Worlds: A Story of Interracial Love" |
| 1992–93 | Out All Night | Vidal Thomas | Main Cast |
| 1993 | The Fresh Prince of Bel-Air | Duane | Episode: "It's Better to Have Loved and Lost It..." |
| 1995 | Happily Ever After: Fairy Tales for Every Child | The Prince (voice) | Episode: "Rapunzel" |
| 1995 | The Fresh Prince of Bel-Air | Duane | Episode: "I, Ooh, Baby, Baby" |
| 1997 | Living Single | Ty Richardson | Episode: "Living Single Undercover" |
| 1997 | Between Brothers | Mason | Episode: "The List" |
| 1998 | The Wonderful World of Disney | Jim | Episode: "Mr. Headmistress" |
| 1998 | Getting Personal | Milo Doucette | Main Cast |
| 2000 | Girlfriends | Preston C. Hall (Joan's Love Interest) | Episode: "Fried Turkey" |
| 2001 | One on One | Elliott | Episode: "Phantom Menace" |
| 2002 | Intimate Portrait | Himself | Episode: "Tisha Campbell-Martin" |
| 2002 | Yes, Dear | Alan | Episode: "Greg's New Friend" |
| 2003 | Abby | - | Episode: "Abby Gets Her Groove Back" |
| 2003-07 | All of Us | Robert James | Main Cast |
| 2006 | Ghost Whisperer | Ashton Belluso | Episode: "The Vanishing" |
| 2007 | E! True Hollywood Story | Himself | Episode: "Will Smith" |
| 2008 | The Game | Himself | Episode: "A Delectable Basket of Treats" |
| 2009 | Rita Rocks | Chuck DeShannon | Recurring Cast: Season 2 |
| 2011 | The Paul Reiser Show | Fernando | Main Cast |
| 2013–16 | Real Husbands of Hollywood | Himself | Main Cast |
| 2015 | Unsung Hollywood | Himself | Episode: "Vivica A. Fox" |
| 2017 | The Odd Couple | Michael | Episode: "The God Couple" |
| 2017 | The New Edition Story | Louil Silas Jr. | Main Cast |
| 2017 | Unsung Hollywood | Himself | Episode: "Tupac Shakur" |
| 2018 | Meet the Peetes | Himself | Episode: "The Guilt Trip" |
| 2019–20 | L.A.'s Finest | Ben Baines | Main Cast |
| 2022 | Real Husbands of Hollywood | Himself | Main Cast |
| 2022 | Bel-Air | Steven Lewis | Recurring Cast: Season 1 |
| 2025 | The Neighborhood | Mr. Isaacs | Episode: "Welcome to the Downsizing" |

== Awards and nominations ==
BET Comedy Awards

- 2004: Nominated, "Outstanding Supporting Actor in a Box Office Movie" – Deliver Us From Eva
- 2005: Nominated, "Outstanding Lead Actor in a Comedy Series" – All of Us

Daytime Emmy Award

- 1993: Nominated, "Outstanding Performer in a Children's Special" – CBS Schoolbreak Special

NAACP Image Award

- 2007: Nominated, "Outstanding Actor in a Comedy Series" – All of Us
