= Shawn Emanuel =

British singer- songwriter

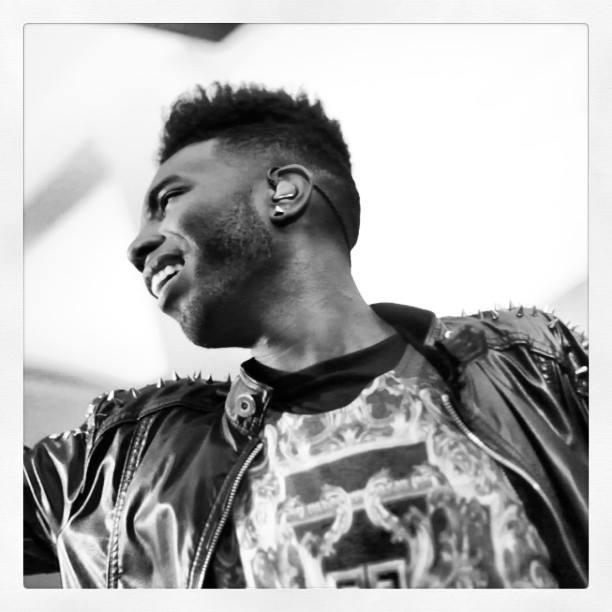
- Shawn Emanuel

Background information
- Born: Shawn Cory Emanuel; 5 January (Capricorn); London, England
- Genres: R&B, soul-funk
- Occupations: Singer, songwriter, record producer
- Instrument: Piano
- Years active: 2001–present

Shawn Emanuel is a British R&B, soul, and pop singer-songwriter and record producer from West London's Notting Hill Gate.

== Biography ==
=== Early years ===
Emanuel was born in London's borough of Lambeth on 5 January. Although he was born in South London, he grew up in West London with his mother. His father is a reggae artist who recorded under the name Dixie Peach for the London-based record label Jah Tubby's. He is the second oldest, of four siblings. His musical influences are Stevie Wonder and Michael Jackson.

"Even at a very young age, he was always intrigued with music. Before attending Primary School, he was caught several times on a small keyboard imitating Stevie Wonder."

While attending Fox Primary School in West London, his mother sent him to Piano lessons once a week to nurture his passion for music. He also learned to play the Cello and attended the Centre for Young Musicians Weekend College in his early teens.

Emanuel was a student at The Brit School for performing arts. His passion for the stage was enhanced by his extra-curricular studies as a Sound and Lighting Technician. Emanuel also attended Westminster Theatre Arts and was a member of Sabrina Guinness’s YCTV.

=== Early career ===
Emanuel cycled through a few boy bands before deciding to try it solo. After recording a song "Shake That Thing" with British rapper Estelle, he was then given the opportunity to tour with singer Kelly Rowland as an opening act for her Simply Deeper Tour by Mean Fiddler Director/Promoter Rob Hallett and went later on to support Beyoncé Knowles for the European part of her Dangerously in Love Tour. He was also one of the opening acts on the European leg of Destiny's Child's Destiny Fulfilled ... And Lovin' It tour. Soon after Emanuel was invited by rapper Kanye West to join the Late Registration tour with fellow support act Keyshia Cole. Other tours include the Sugababes Taller in more ways tour, Jagged Edge and Missy Elliott.

=== DreamWorld Era ===
In May 2004, Emanuel signed a five-album deal with EMI. His album with EMI was titled "Dreamworld". The album was recorded in the old school Motown style, which included recording live vocals on tape and not digitally. His first single "Slow it Down", produced by Dan Carey was released on 29 May 2006 and his second single "U Better Believe it" was released on 16 October 2006. All tracks were mixed by multi-Grammy Award winner, Tom Elmhirst. His "Dreamworld" album was not released due to his departure from EMI in 2007.

Shawn Emanuel

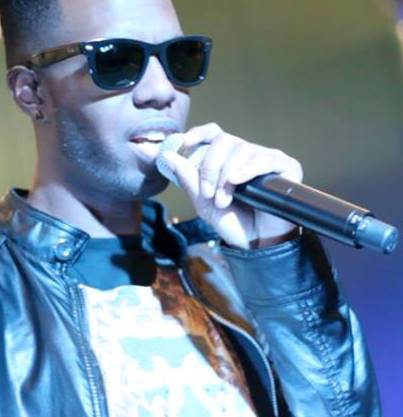
Shawn Emanuel

== Discography ==
=== Singles ===
- "Messed Up" (28 May 2021)
- "Forever" (25 February 2021)
- "Did You Tell Her" (25 February 2021)
- "Slow It Down" (29 May 2006)
- "U Better Believe" featuring Malik Yusef (16 October 2006)
