= Simply Deeper Tour =

2003 concert tour by Kelly Rowland

- Tour by Kelly Rowland
- Location: Europe
- Associated album: Simply Deep
- Start date: September 13, 2003
- End date: October 6, 2003
- Legs: 1
- No. of shows: 17

Kelly Rowland concert chronology
- Simply Deeper Tour (2003); Ms. Kelly Tour (2007)

The Simply Deeper Tour was the debut concert tour by American R&B recording artist Kelly Rowland. It was launched in support of her debut solo album Simply Deep (2002). The Simply Deeper Tour only reached Europe.

== History ==
This was Rowland's first concert tour as a solo artist and it was used to promote her debut solo studio album, Simply Deep. The concert embarked on a seventeen date tour, hitting up seventeen European cities between September 2003 and October 2003. While Rowland enjoyed moderate success in North American countries such as the U.S. and Canada, her album was a commercial success in the European market and was certified gold or platinum in six countries. Simply Deep also peaked in the top twenty within nine European countries, peaking at number one in both the U.K. and Ireland. Rowland was originally set to embark on her tour at the beginning of April 2003, but pushed the tour back to September 2003 because of fears regarding the ongoing wars with Afghanistan and Iraq.

== Critical response ==
While the tour received limited reviews, the Simply Deeper Tour's London show appeared to be well received. Melisa Tang of the U.K. online entertainment webazine, The Situation, states, "Even though the Hammersmith Apollo was smaller than other venues this girl is probably used to, Kelly had given it her all, and it had certainly paid off. Everyone left the auditorium buzzing with delight, and even I was surprised at how this once shy teenager had blossomed into a strong, confident young woman." Lisa Verrico of The Times had mixed reviews of Rowland’s London show. "There’s no question that Rowland has an outstanding voice and there were a surprising number of good songs in her set." Verrico acknowledges before claiming, "The snag was that they weren’t as good as DC’s best."

== Opening acts ==
- Motley
- Michael Dion
- Shawn Emanuel featuring Estelle
- Solange

== Set list ==
1. "Simply Deep"
2. "Love/Hate"
3. "Can't Nobody"
4. "Dilemma"
5. "(Love Lives In) Strange Places"
6. "Everytime You Walk Out That Door"
7. "Train on a Track"
8. "Destiny's Child Medley:
  1. "Emotion" (contains excerpts from "How Deep Is Your Love")
  2. "Bootylicious"
9. "Make U Wanna Stay"
10. "Beyond Imagination"
11. "Stole"
12. "Past 12" (Encore)

== Tour dates ==
Date	City	Country	Venue
Europe
September 11, 2003	Dublin	Ireland	Vicar Street
September 13, 2003	Glasgow	United Kingdom	Clyde Auditorium
September 14, 2003	Newcastle	United Kingdom	Newcastle City Hall
September 16, 2003	Wolverhampton	United Kingdom	Wolverhampton Civic Hall
September 17, 2003	Bristol	United Kingdom	Colston Hall
September 19, 2003	Manchester	United Kingdom	Manchester Apollo
September 20, 2003	Sheffield	United Kingdom	Sheffield City Hall
September 21, 2003	London	United Kingdom	Hammersmith Apollo
September 24, 2003	Zürich	Switzerland	Volkshaus
September 25, 2003	Munich	Germany	Cirkus Krone
September 27, 2003	Berlin	Germany	Columbiahalle
September 28, 2003	Hamburg	Germany	Große Freiheit
September 29, 2003	Copenhagen	Denmark	Vega
October 1, 2003	Frankfurt	Germany	Jahrhunderthalle
October 2, 2003	Amsterdam	Netherlands	Heineken Music Hall
October 3, 2003	Düsseldorf	Germany	Phillipshalle
October 4, 2003	Antwerp	Belgium	TMF Awards
October 6, 2003	Paris	France	L'Olympia
