= Fox Primary School =

Location
- Kensington Place; Notting Hill, London, W8 7PP; England
- Coordinates: 51.5072°N 0.197°W

Information
- Type: Community primary school
- Motto: Loving Learning. Making A Difference.
- Established: 1842; 184 years ago
- Department for Education URN: 100482 Tables
- Ofsted: Reports
- Head teacher: Paul Cotter
- Gender: Coeducational
- Age: 4 to 11
- Website: www.fox.rbkc.sch.uk

Fox Primary School is a primary school in London for children between the ages of 4 and 11, in the Royal Borough of Kensington and Chelsea. It is located on Kensington Place, between Kensington Church Street and Notting Hill Gate.

The school has a playground on each side. Prior to the 1960s the school was infants only, aged 5 – 7. The Junior School was adjacent, a Church of England school called St George's School. St George's had no playground and shared the Fox School playgrounds. During the Second World War, pupils from the school were evacuated and taught at Lacock Abbey, Wiltshire. The school has a large new addition to its land, completed in 2017.

== History ==
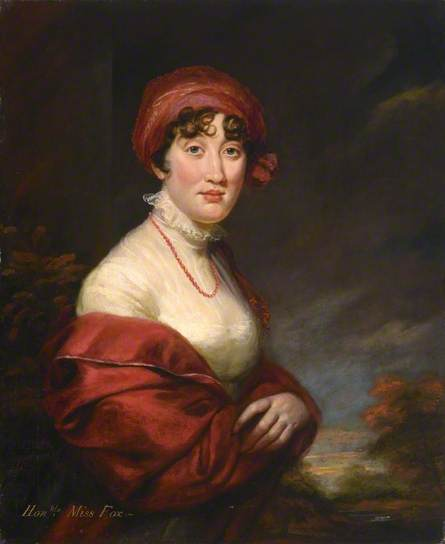
1810 portrait of Caroline Fox, then aged 43, by James Northcote

The school was founded in 1842, as a charity school "for the education of children of the labouring, manufacturing and other poorer classes" of Kensington by Caroline Fox. Fox was the only daughter of Stephen Fox, 2nd Baron Holland, of Holland House, Kensington, sister of Henry Vassall-Fox, 3rd Baron Holland, who owned most of the land within the manor of Kensington, and niece of the Whig statesman Charles James Fox.

At the time of the school's establishment Fox was living at Little Holland House, on the west side of today's Holland Park, and the school was sited nearby. In 1876 the school was taken over by the London School Board and moved to a new site in Silver Street, today the northern end of Kensington Church Street. The school moved a third time in 1937 to its present site on Kensington Place.

== Notable former pupils ==
- Melissa Benn
- Nathaniel Parker
- Darcey Bussell
- Sophia Myles
- Miquita Oliver
- Shawn Emanuel
- Milton Mermikides
- Tayshan Hayden-Smith

== Notable former teachers ==
- Ivor Cutler
- Honor Blackman
