= Train on a Track =

Single by Kelly Rowland

from the album Simply Deep
- Released: August 4, 2003
- Recorded: 2002
- Studio: The Hit Factory (New York City, New York)
- Genre: Acoustic; rock; soft rock
- Length: 3:43
- Label: Columbia; Music World
- Songwriters: Rob Fusari; Sylvester Jordan Jr.; Balewa Muhammad; Tiaa Wells
- Producer: Rob Fusari

Kelly Rowland singles chronology
"Can't Nobody" (2003)	"Train on a Track" (2003)	"Une femme en prison" (2003)

Music video
- "Train on a Track" on YouTube

"Train on a Track" is a song by American singer Kelly Rowland. It was written by Rob Fusari, Sylvester Jordan Jr., Balewa Muhammad, and Tiaa Wells and recorded by Rowland for her solo debut album Simply Deep (2002), while production was helmed by Fusari. A light and breezy pop rock song that is built around an acoustic guitar-driven instrumentation, the love song has Rowland singing about a person whom she considers her equal in every manner. The song's musical composition, as well as Rowland's harmonies and the poetic wordplay of its lyrics, positively surprised critics.

The song was released as the third international and final single from Simply Deep in August 2003. A moderate commercial success, it became Rowland's fourth consecutive the top twenty entry on the UK Singles Chart, peaking at number twenty. In addition, "Train on a Track" charted in Australia, Germany, Ireland, the Netherlands, Scotland, and Switzerland. An accompanying music video was directed by Antti Jokinen and filmed in the Northern Beaches region of Sydney in mid-2003. In support of its single release, Rowland made the song part of her Simply Deeper Tour (2003) setlist and performed it at the TMF Awards. It was also featured on the soundtracks to the romantic comedy films The Seat Filler (2004) and Maid in Manhattan (2002).

== Background ==
After the release of her former group Destiny's Child's 2001 album Survivor, Rowland launched a solo career when American rapper Nelly asked her to appear as a feature volalist on his song "Dilemma". The record originally appeared on his album Nellyville (2002) and was released as its third single. An instant success, it became a worldwide number-one hit that year and prompted Rowland's label Columbia Records to advance the release date of her solo album from 2003 to late 2002 to capitalize on the success of "Dilemma". Rowland was forced to complete the album within a month. "Train on a Track" was contributed by producer and songwriter Rob Fusari with whom Rowland had previously worked with on Survivor. Fusari co-wrote the song along with Balewa Muhammad, Tiaa Wells, and Sylvester Jordan Jr. While chief production was overseen by Fusari, vocal production was handled by Wells and Jordan. Commenting on his involvement with Simply Deep, Fusari said: "I really liked working on Kelly’s album, because it gave me the opportunity to stretch a bit musically. "Train on a Track" [...] has a more folk/acoustic sound, more in the vein of Natalie Imbruglia than pure R&B. Kelly was also fun to work with. She's very nice and caring, and she's also a star."

== Critical reception ==
"Train on a Track" received generally positive reviews from music critics. Sal Cinquemani of Slant complimented the track for its "light and breezy" nature and named it, along with "(Love Lives In) Strange Places", Simply Deep's best tracks. He found that both records "infuse the singer’s lush harmonies with acoustic guitars and poetic wordplay." Houston Chronicle journalist Michael D. Clark called the song "a daring singer-songwriter rock departure." AllMusic editor Jon O'Brien wrote in his review, that "gorgeous "Train on a Track," an acoustic-driven lament to the first flourishes of love [...] deviates from the late-night slow jam pastiche formula." BBC Music editor Joy Dunbar found that "Rowland makes a faint break from the Destinys Child ethos as "Train on a Track" attempts to rebel against her former sound with the occasional, edgy rock chords and heavy use of guitars. However, this uninspiring, longing love song tries too hard to promote her shift away from the group and interferes with the structure of the album." Joe Ng, writing for MTV Asia described the song as a "road trip folk number with surrealistic rock riffs to boot."

== Music video ==
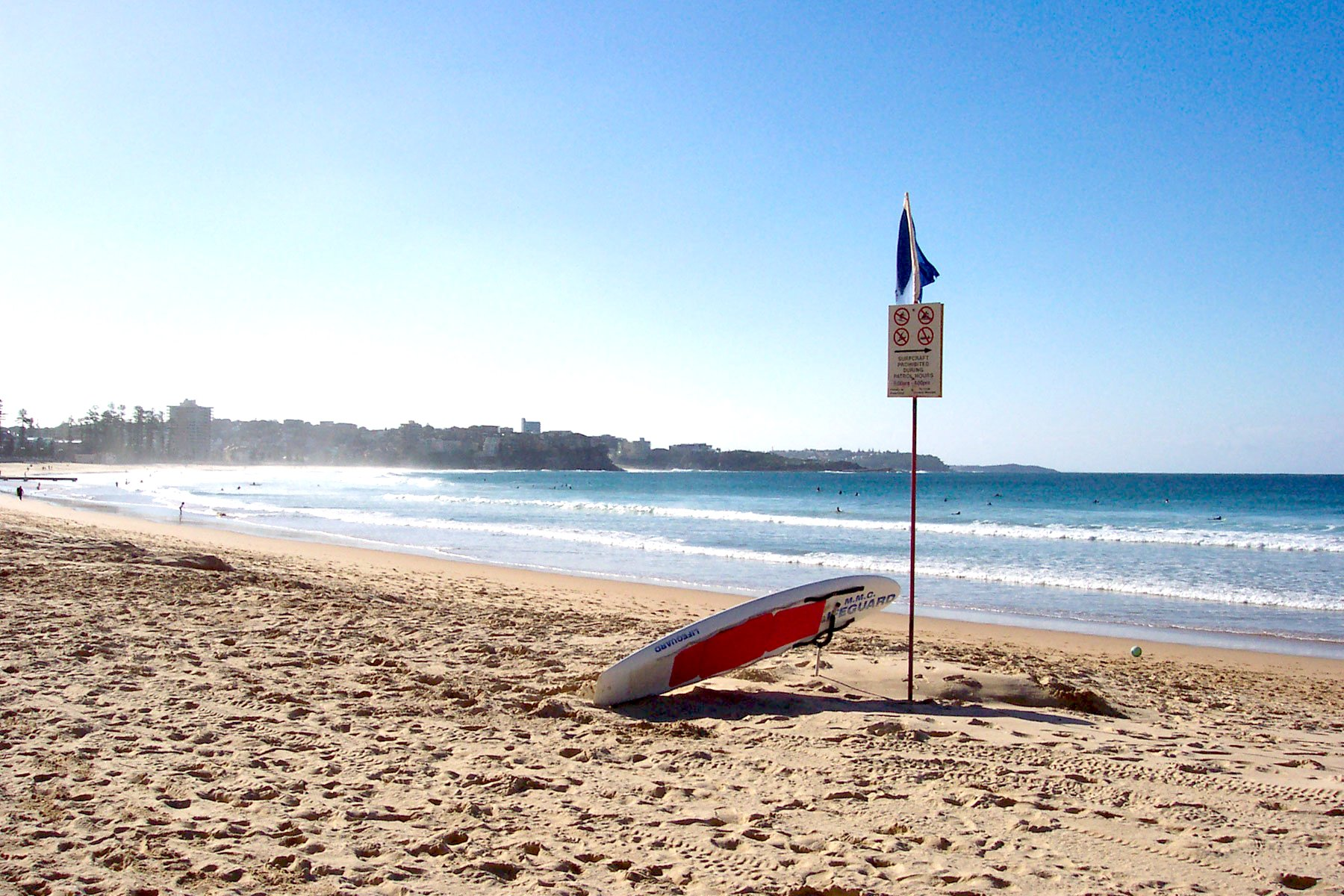
A music video was filmed on Sydney's Northern Beaches.

The accompanying music video for "Train on a Track" was directed by Finnish director Antti Jokinen and filmed in the suburb of Palm Beach in Sydney's Northern Beaches region at the end of Rowland's Australian tour in mid-2003. In the clip, a red-haired Rowland is seen dancing barefoot in the sand, wearing pink and blue pastel-colored dresses, while holding a pair of golden stilettos in her hands. Intercut are scenes of the singer sitting on the rocks by night and her laying on a lush sofa in a calm cave.

Upon its release, the music video for "Train on a Track" was included on the European maxi-single as an enhanced video element. It was later also included on the Japanese edition of Destiny's Child's Destiny's Child World Tour concert DVD, released in 2003, as well as the 2005 Wal-Mart exclusive edition of Destiny's Child's Fan Pack II DVD which was released along before the release of Number 1's (2005), and the 2007 Wal-Mart-exclusive DVD BET Presents Kelly Rowland.

== Track listing and formats ==
International CD single I

1. "Train on a Track" (album version)
2. "Train on a Track" (HR Crump Remix)
3. "Emotion" (live from Rotterdam audio version)
4. "Train on a Track" (music video)

International CD single II

1. "Train on a Track" (album version)
2. "Can't Nobody" (Ced Solo NYC Remix)
3. "Can't Nobody" (Ron G Remix)

Australian CD single

1. "Train on a Track" (album version)
2. "Train on a Track" (HR Crump Remix)
3. "Train on a Track" (Rob Fusari Remix)
4. "Can't Nobody" (Ron G Remix)

German Pock It-CD (2 track CD single)

1. "Train on a Track" (album version)
2. "Train on a Track" (Rob Fusari Remix)

== Credits and personnel ==
Credits adapted from the liner notes of Simply Deep.

- Tom Coyne – mastering
- Rob Fusari – writing, production, instruments
- Sylvester Jordan Jr. – vocal production
- Tony Maserati – mixing
- Nick Moroch – electric guitar
- Flip Osman – instruments assistance
- Kelly Rowland – vocals
- Tiaa Wells – vocal production

== Charts ==
Chart (2003)	Peak position
Australia (ARIA)	61
Australian Urban (ARIA)	17
Belgium (Ultratip Bubbling Under Flanders)	16
Germany (GfK)	93
Ireland (IRMA)	44
Netherlands (Dutch Top 40 Tipparade)	16
Netherlands (Single Top 100)	83
Scotland Singles (OCC)	21
Switzerland (Schweizer Hitparade)	67
UK Singles (OCC)	20
UK Hip Hop/R&B (OCC)	6

== Release history ==
Release dates and formats for "Train on a Track"
Region	Date	Format(s)	Label(s)	Ref.
United Kingdom	August 4, 2003	Two maxi CDs	Columbia	
Germany	September 22, 2003	CD; maxi CD; mini CD	Columbia	
Australia	October 20, 2003	CD	Columbia	
