= Une femme en prison =

Single by Stomy Bugsy featuring Kelly Rowland

from the album 4ème Round
- Released: June 2003
- Studio: Palais des congrès de Paris (Paris, France); Master Studios (Le Mans, France)
- Genre: French rap; R&B
- Songwriter(s): Djam L; Maleko; Stomy Bugsy
- Producer(s): Djam L; Maleko

Stomy Bugsy singles chronology
"Une femme en prison" (2003)	"Lève-toi et marque" (2006)

Kelly Rowland singles chronology
"Train on a Track" (2003)	"Une femme en prison" (2003)	"Here We Go" (2005)

"Une femme en prison" (French: A Woman in Jail) is a song by French rapper Stomy Bugsy, featuring American singer Kelly Rowland. It was written by Bugsy along with Djamel "Djam L" Boukhit and Dimitri "Maleko" Jamois for his 2003 studio album 4ème Round, while production was helmed by Boukhit and Jamois. Released as a single in June 2003, it was entered the French Singles Chart, peaking at number 62. The song was also included on the French edition of Rowland's debut album Simply Deep (2002).

== Formats and track listings ==
CD single
No.	Title	Length
1.	"Une femme en prison" (featuring Kelly Rowland)	4:05
2.	"Viens avec moi" (featuring Passi & Newfel)	3:23
3.	"Viens avec moi" (featuring Newfel)	3:23
4.	"Lascarface"	3:55

== Credits and personnel ==
Credits adapted from the liner notes of Simply Deep.

- Cyril Ballouard – guitar
- Jean-Christophe Beaudon – mastering
- Nadia Boukhit – choir
- Thierry Chassang – recording
- Nicolas Duport – mixing, recording
- Djam L – production, writing
- Maleko – production, writing
- Mohamed "Momo" Hasfi – bass
- Isabelle Nesmon – adaptation
- Kelly Rowland – vocals

== Charts ==
Chart (2003)	Peak position
France (SNEP)	62
