= Out All Night (TV series) =

American sitcom

- Genre: Sitcom
- Created by: Andy Borowitz; Susan Borowitz; Rob Edwards
- Written by: Andy Borowitz; Susan Borowitz; Jeffrey Duteil; Rob Edwards; Lloyd Garver; Michelle Jones; Caryn Lucas; Eric Pomerance; B. Mark Seabrooks; Devon Shepard
- Directed by: Matthew Diamond
- Starring: Patti LaBelle; Morris Chestnut; Vivica A. Fox; Duane Martin; Simon O'Brien
- Theme music composer: James R. Ellison; Nathaniel Wilkie
- Opening theme: "Out All Night" performed by Patti LaBelle
- Composer: Quincy Jones
- Country of origin: United States
- Original language: English
- No. of seasons: 1
- No. of episodes: 20 (1 unaired)

Production
- Executive producers: Andy Borowitz; Susan Borowitz
- Producers: Matthew Diamond; Werner Walian
- Editor: Jesse Hoke
- Camera setup: Multi-camera
- Running time: 30 minutes
- Production companies: PAZ, inc. Alan Haymon Productions; The Stuffed Dog Company; NBC Productions

Original release
- Network: NBC
- Release: September 19, 1992 – July 9, 1993

Out All Night is an American sitcom that aired on NBC from September 19, 1992, to July 9, 1993, for one season. The series stars Patti LaBelle, and was created by Andy Borowitz, Susan Borowitz, and Rob Edwards.

== Cast ==
- Patti LaBelle – Chelsea Paige
- Morris Chestnut – Jeff Carswell
- Vivica A. Fox – Charisse Chamberlain
- Duane Martin – Vidal Thomas
- Simon O'Brien – Angus McEwen

== Episodes ==
No.	Title	Directed by	Written by	Original release date	US viewers (millions)
1	"Pilot"	Matthew Diamond	Susan Borowitz & Rob Edwards & Andy Borowitz	September 19, 1992	13.1
2	"Gentlemen's Agreement"	Matthew Diamond	Eric Pomerance	September 26, 1992	12.9
3	"The Kid"	Matthew Diamond	Rob Edwards	October 3, 1992	10.6
4	"On My Own"	Matthew Diamond	Michelle Jones	October 10, 1992	11.7
5	"That Man Returns"	Unknown	Unknown	October 17, 1992	11.2
6	"The Dream Team"	Unknown	Unknown	October 24, 1992	10.6
7	"Hammer Halloween"	Matthew Diamond	B. Mark Seabrooks	October 31, 1992	11.9
8	"That's What Friends Are For"	Matthew Diamond	Caryn Lucas	November 19, 1992	12.6
9	"Smooth Operator"	Matthew Diamond	Rob Edwards	December 3, 1992	11.8
10	"The Great Pretender"	Matthew Diamond	Andy Borowitz & Susan Borowitz	December 10, 1992	12.7
11	"The Three Wise Men"	Unknown	Unknown	December 17, 1992	10.4
12	"A Date with a Diva"	Unknown	Unknown	January 7, 1993	12.8
13	"Like Father, Like Son"	Matthew Diamond	Rob Edwards	January 14, 1993	11.4
14	"Take This Job"	Matthew Diamond	Michelle Jones	January 21, 1993	12.0
15	"The Way We Were"	Unknown	Unknown	January 28, 1993	N/A
16	"The Tenant's Commandments"	Matthew Diamond	Jeffrey Duteil & B. Mark Seabrooks	February 12, 1993	6.5
17	"Under My Thumb"	Unknown	Unknown	June 25, 1993	4.3
18	"Mall in the Family"	Unknown	Unknown	July 2, 1993	4.6
19	"Taking Care of Business"	Matthew Diamond	Michelle Jones	July 9, 1993	4.3
20	"It's My Party"	N/A	Lloyd Garver	Unaired	N/A
