= The Seat Filler =

- DVD cover
- Directed by: Nick Castle
- Written by: Mark Brown; Duane Martin (Note: Martin is credited as a writer twice; first as part of a team with Brown, and again with Campbell-Martin.); Tisha Campbell-Martin
- Produced by: Duane Martin; D'Angela P. Steed; Nia T. Hill; Sharifa Johka; Mark Brown
- Starring: Duane Martin; Kelly Rowland; Melanie Brown; DeRay Davis; Patrick Fischler; Shemar Moore
- Cinematography: Suki Medencevic
- Edited by: Patrick Kennedy; Julia Wong
- Music by: Robbie Lewis
- Production companies: Shake Martin Films; Strange Fruit Films; C4 Pictures
- Distributed by: The Momentum Experience
- Release dates: August 5, 2004 (Urbanworld Film Festival); July 20, 2005 (United States)
- Running time: 90 minutes
- Country: United States
- Language: English
- Budget: $8 million
- Box office: $27.9 million

The Seat Filler is a 2004 American romantic comedy musical film directed by Nick Castle and written by Mark Brown, Duane Martin, and Tisha Campbell-Martin. It stars Martin, Kelly Rowland, Mel B, DeRay Davis, Patrick Fischler, and Shemar Moore. The film premiered at the Urbanworld Film Festival on August 5, 2004, and was released in theaters the United States on July 20, 2005, by The Momentum Experience. It received mainly average reviews. It is also recognized as Martin's first (and to date, only) appearance in a musical film and Rowland's most successful film in a leading role.

== Plot ==
Derrick, an aspiring lawyer who is studying for the bar exam, struggles to keep his head above water financially. His best friend and roommate E.J. suggests Derrick join him at his job as a seat filler at awards shows. When seat filling at the Video Beat awards gala, Derrick meets popular R&B singer Jhnelle, who mistakes him for a regular guest. Believing that he is Alonzo Grant, entertainment lawyer to the stars, Jhnelle asks Derrick out on a date.

During the date Derrick tells Jhnelle that he is not Alonzo Grant and that he cannot afford the meal, but she explains she was planning to pay for it anyway and laughs, believing Derrick to be kidding. They leave the restaurant with plans for a second date.

Derrick plans on cancelling the date because he cannot afford it, but E.J. tells him not to worry and that he's got everything covered as long as he takes him along. Derrick, Jhnelle, E.J., and Jhnelle's friend Sandie take a Bentley that E.J. "borrowed" while pretending to be valet and head to a club. Jhnelle's ex-boyfriend Trent is there and causes problems while E.J. tells Derrick that the rightful car owner is also at the club. Derrick, who didn't know about the stolen car, gets upset and walks away from E.J. who chases after Sandie while Jhnelle and Derrick leave the club. Jhnelle asks to take the car home but Derrick suggests taking the bus instead. They get off and walk around town, where Derrick again tries to tell Jhnelle the truth, but she interrupts him with a kiss.

The next day Jhnelle leaves a message on Derrick's phone saying she wants to have lunch and that she'll meet him at "his" office. Derrick panics over what to do and E.J. yells at him to run. He quickly gets dressed and runs to the building where Alonzo works and is just in time to meet Jhnelle there, suggesting they do something "better than lunch" which is a movie at a theater in the hood. Meanwhile, Trent goes to Alonzo's office to confront him.

Trent goes to Jhnelle and begs her to go with him to a TV award show. She agrees, but only as a friend. There they meet Derrick who is seat filling. Trent accuses him of looking awfully good considering Alonzo Grant has been in the hospital for the past two weeks, and asks a worker there what his real name is, who answers Derrick Harver. Jhnelle begins to cry and begs Al to say something, but Derrick replies, "My name is Derrick" and she runs off. Derrick punches Trent and tries to run after her but is stopped by security.

Over the next few days Derrick tries persistently to call Jhnelle but Sandie answers and to Jhnelle's request tells him she's out. Sandie tries to get Jhnelle to talk to him for closure but Jhnelle refuses saying she just wants to work on her album.

With VIP access given to him by Sandie, Derrick tries to meet Jhnelle at a shoot for her music video. He tells her that he's sorry and that what he felt for her was real, but she accuses him of being a liar and explains she can't believe that, then walks away with Derrick calling after her.

Derrick falls into a slump until E.J. tells him to stop acting like him and start acting like himself. Derrick goes on to pass his Bar Exam, get a job and get a nice apartment. While unpacking he turns on the television and sees Jhnelle on screen at an award show. Inspired, he calls up E.J and they go posing as seat fillers. While she's performing, Derrick and the other seat fillers begin to stand up holding white carnations, inspired by a story Jhnelle once told him about her grandparents. He tries to walk up to her but is stopped by security. She tells them to wait and goes to him and the two embrace.

== Cast ==
- Duane Martin as Derrick Harver
- Kelly Rowland as Jhnelle
- DeRay Davis as E.J.
- Curtis Armstrong as LaJean
- Melanie Brown as Sandie
- Patrick Fischler as Irwin
- Shemar Moore as Trent
- Glynn Turman as Derrick's father
- Christian Copelin as Kenny
- Denise Dowse as Derrick's mother
- Kyla Pratt as Diona
- Michael Chinyamurindi as Nail

Kenny Lattimore and Chante Moore make cameo appearances as themselves. Eriq La Salle makes an uncredited cameo appearance as Alonzo Grant, the man whose identity Derrick uses to impress Jhnelle.

== Production ==
Movie/TV actress Tisha Campbell, wife of star/producer Duane Martin, receives a co-writing credit.

== Music ==
"I Need a Love"

Single by Kelly Rowland
- Released: April 27, 2004
- Recorded: 2004
- Genre: Pop, R&B
- Length: 3:47
- Label: Blacktrak Entertainment
- Songwriters: Kelly Rowland, Rob Lewis, Courtney Harrell, Cookie Lewis
- Producer: Rob Lewis

No soundtrack album was released for the film. Instead a promo single by Kelly Rowland, "I Need a Love", was released. Rowland contributed a total of five songs to the film.

Songs used in the film include:

1. "I Need a Love": performed by Kelly Rowland, written by Rob Lewis, Courtney Harrell and Cookie Lewis.
2. "Follow Your Destiny": performed by Kelly Rowland, written by Rob Lewis, Courtney Harrell, Cookie Lewis.
3. "Flashback": performed by Kelly Rowland
4. "Lost Without You": performed by Chante Moore, written by Rob Lewis and Kevin White.
5. "Ultimate Hollywood": written by Stephen James Edwards.
6. "Alma Latina": written by Elizabeth Carbe.
7. "Classic Romance": written by Linda Martinez.
8. "Chicago Style": written by Larry Cohn.
9. "Murder Battle": written by Johann Lestat.
10. "Hollywood Stars": written by Linda Martinez.
11. "Jungle Bee": written by Simon Holland.
12. "Glances": written by I, Romeo.
13. "Eazy Rider": written by Deklan Flynn.
14. "Cajon Heat": written by Best Mekanic and Candence Blaze.
15. "Think About It": performed by Honey, written by Monique Francis.
16. "Boom": performed by Brie, written by James Terry and Walter Scott.
17. "BlackOut": performed by Baby Docks, written by D. Vardelja
18. "The Skate Thing": written and performed by Michael Angelo Berry.
19. "Sometimes Love": performed by Voyce, written by Steve Harvey and Nia Long.
20. "In Case You Didn't Know": performed by Nastacia Kendall, written by Rob Lewis
21. "Do What It Do": performed by Street Loyalty, written by Greg Charley.
22. "Fire and Desire": performed by Rick James, written by James and Teena Marie.
23. "Stop Boy": written and performed by Nastacia Kendall.
24. "US2": performed by Trendaettas, written by Dan-lala.
25. "About You": performed by Diamond Malone, written by David Hunter and Carlton Martin.
26. "Bad Habit": performed by Kelly Rowland, written by Rowland, Solange Knowles and Bryan Michael Cox
27. "Train on a Track": performed by Kelly Rowland, written by Rob Fusari, Tiaa Wells, Balewa Muhammad and Sylvester Jordan.
28. "Let's Go Back": performed by Keys, written by Timothy Bloom.

== Box office performance ==
The film debuted 18 in the box office top twenty for the week, grossing $4,812,287 in 287 cinemas. It averaged $4,410 at 2,905 sites, and earned a total domestic gross ticket sales of $10,238,923. Worldwide, the film grossed $17,972,898.

== Reviews ==
The film has received mainly average reviews. Garnering a rating of 3/5 stars, Vince Leo of Qwipster.net states that "While it isn't a must-see film by any means, never rising above a level of being merely pleasantly enjoyable, for those that enjoy romantic comedies, this one has enough moments of cleverness and natural charm to justify seeking out". Andy Dursin of The Aisle Seat gave the film 2.5/4 stars staying "This romantic comedy with an African-American cast was capably directed by Nick Castle (“The Last Starfighter”) and offers an appealing cast, with the two leads generating believable chemistry throughout". HomeTheaterInfo.com also gave the film 2.5/4 stars praising Rowland by stating that she "has what it takes to be a romantic comedy success, she is pretty, talented and be the girl next door or the sought after star. She also connects well with her fellow actors here providing a performance that the audience to become emotional invested with her character."

== DVD release ==
The film was released on DVD in the United States on February 21, 2006, by Magnolia Home Entertainment. On its second week of release, it entered the United States Billboard DVD Chart (top 40) at number 14 and sold over 160,000 copies. After seven weeks of release it has made an estimate of $6,847,722 in sales.

Special features

- All-Access featurette
- Deleted scenes
- Extended Performance of "Follow Your Destiny" by Kelly Rowland

== Recognitions ==
1. 2005 Debuted at #18 on Box Office Top Twenty Weekly
2. 2006 #14 on United States Billboard DVD Chart (top 40)
