= Maid in Manhattan =

2002 film by Wayne Wang

- Theatrical release poster
- Directed by: Wayne Wang
- Screenplay by: Kevin Wade
- Story by: Edmond Dantès
- Produced by: Elaine Goldsmith-Thomas; Paul Schiff; Deborah Schindler
- Starring: Jennifer Lopez; Ralph Fiennes; Natasha Richardson; Stanley Tucci; Bob Hoskins
- Cinematography: Karl Walter Lindenlaub
- Edited by: Craig McKay
- Music by: Alan Silvestri
- Production companies: Columbia Pictures; Revolution Studios; Red Om Films
- Distributed by: Sony Pictures Releasing
- Release date: December 13, 2002
- Running time: 105 minutes
- Country: United States
- Language: English
- Budget: $55 million
- Box office: $154.9 million

Maid in Manhattan is a 2002 American romantic comedy drama film directed by Wayne Wang and based on a story by John Hughes, who is credited using a pseudonym. It stars Jennifer Lopez, Ralph Fiennes, and Natasha Richardson. In the film, a hotel maid and a high-profile politician fall in love. The film was released on December 13, 2002, by Sony Pictures Releasing and was a box office success, grossing $154.9 million against its $55 million budget, while receiving mixed reviews.

== Plot ==
Marisa Ventura, a single mother raising her son Ty, works as a maid at the Beresford Hotel in Manhattan. When not in school, Ty spends time with Marisa's fellow hotel workers, who think she can be promoted to management.

While Marisa and her co-worker Stephanie are cleaning the room of socialite Caroline Lane, Stephanie convinces Marisa to try on an expensive Dolce & Gabbana coat. Lane had previously asked for it to be returned to the store, and Stephanie argues that it "technically" does not belong to anyone. Elsewhere in the hotel, Ty befriends senatorial candidate Christopher "Chris" Marshall, who he learns has an interest in Richard Nixon, the subject of his school project.

Ty wants to go with Chris to walk his dog, and the pair go to Caroline's room to ask Marisa for permission. Chris meets Marisa, who is still wearing that designer coat and is instantly smitten with her. Not knowing that she is a maid, he assumes she is Caroline. The trio spend some time together at the park. Though Marisa and Chris are attracted to each other, she is terrified that management will find out about the ruse and makes it a point to avoid him afterward.

Chris asks the hotel's head butler, Lionel Bloch, to invite "Caroline Lane" to lunch but is confused when Caroline shows up instead of Marisa. When she receives the invitation, Marisa is present and even advises Caroline on what to wear for their "lunch à deux." When Caroline shows up, Chris asks his assistant Jerry Siegal to find "the other Caroline Lane." He promises to attend an important dinner and wishes her to accompany him. Jerry asks Lionel to find her.

Lionel, who has figured out that Marisa is the woman Chris has been looking for, tells her to go to the dinner and end the affair swiftly if she wants a future in hotel management. Stephanie and the hotel staff assist her in preparing for the evening by styling her hair and loaning her an expensive dress and a spectacular necklace.

Marisa is unable to end the affair, so she spends the night in Chris's hotel room. The following day, Caroline and her friend spot Marisa leaving his room. Caroline blurts out the truth to the hotel management, and Marisa is fired in front of Chris in Lane's hotel suite. Marisa and Chris spend time apart, with him still thinking about her. Marisa is also hounded by the media and her disapproving mother, Veronica.

Sometime later, Marisa secures another job as a maid at another hotel. Chris is giving a news conference at the same hotel. Ty attends it and asks Chris whether people should be forgiven if they make mistakes, referencing former President of the United States Richard Nixon. Ty leads him to the staff room, where Marisa is having her break. Chris and Marisa are reunited, and the film ends with images of publications showing that Chris has been elected and he and Marisa are still together after a year. Marisa and her maid friends have been promoted to management.

== Cast ==
- Jennifer Lopez as Marisa Ventura
- Ralph Fiennes as Christopher "Chris" Marshall
- Natasha Richardson as Caroline Lane
- Stanley Tucci as Jerry Siegal
- Tyler Posey as Ty Ventura
- Frances Conroy as Paula Burns
- Chris Eigeman as John Bextrum
- Amy Sedaris as Rachel Hoffberg
- Marissa Matrone as Stephanie Kehoe
- Priscilla Lopez as Veronica
- Bob Hoskins as Lionel Bloch
- Lisa Roberts Gillan as Cora
- Maddie Corman as Leezette
- Sharon Wilkins as Clarice
- Jeffrey Dinowitz as Congressman Grey
- Di Quon as Lily Kim
- Marilyn Torres as Barb
- Lou Ferguson as Keef Townsend

== Production ==
The film was originally titled The Chambermaid, and then Uptown Girl. It was described as a Cinderella-type story. John Hughes was initially announced as the film's director, with Hilary Swank set to star as the lead. Variety confirmed in July 2001 that Jennifer Lopez was in negotiations to star in The Chambermaid, with Hughes no longer directing the project. Swank was no longer involved in the film. Ralph Fiennes signed on to star in the film in February 2002. Natasha Richardson joined the cast in April 2002. The film's title was confirmed as Maid in Manhattan in August 2002. Describing the character of Marisa, Lopez said: "She's Puerto Rican. She's from the Bronx. She has this young son and she's just trying to make ends meet. Every day she gets on the train to work. She goes to this big city of dreams and she wants more. She has aspirations in that way." Fiennes' character was originally a wealthy British guest.

Principal photography commenced in New York City in April, just months after the terrorist attacks of September 11, 2001 in which the towers of the World Trade Center (visible in some unused pre-production footage) were destroyed, and concluded by June 2002. Filming was carried out at both New York's Roosevelt Hotel and the Waldorf-Astoria Hotel. Filming also took place in the Morris Heights section of the Bronx on E 175 Street between the Grand Concourse and on Jerome Avenue. John Hughes wrote the story, but was credited as Edmond Dantes. On the film's first day of production in The Bronx, paparazzi and spectators forced filming to stop, and police were called as a result of the pandemonium. Wayne Wang said "No one in the production was prepared for it."

== Soundtrack ==
The film features Paul Simon's "Me and Julio Down by the Schoolyard" in the opening credits, "Lovergirl" sung by Teena Marie, "Train on a Track" sung by Kelly Rowland, "Come Away with Me" and "Don't Know Why" sung by Norah Jones, Michael Jackson's "Fall Again" sung by Glenn Lewis, Paul Simon's "Kathy's Song" sung by Eva Cassidy and "I'm Coming Out" sung by Amerie.

== Reception ==
=== Box office ===
Maid in Manhattan opened at 2,838 theaters in the United States, reaching number one at the box office in its opening weekend with $18.7 million, narrowly beating out Star Trek: Nemesis, by less than $200,000. It earned a total of $94 million domestically, and $60.9 million in other countries, for a total gross of $154.8 million worldwide.

=== Critical response ===
Maid in Manhattan received mixed reviews from film critics. On the review aggregator Rotten Tomatoes, the film holds a rating of 37% based on 141 reviews, with an average rating of 5.10/10. The website's critics consensus reads: "Too blandly generic, Maid in Manhattan also suffers from a lack of chemistry between Lopez and Fiennes." Metacritic assigned the film a weighted average score of 45 out of 100, based on 32 critics, indicating "mixed or average reviews". Audiences polled by CinemaScore gave the film an average grade of "B+" on an A+ to F scale.

Time magazine named it one of the top 10 worst chick flicks. According to Anna Smith of the magazine Empire: "the film constantly falls back on its staple fairy-tale plotline, which is so resolutely traditional it should succeed in charming its target audience". Nell Minow of Common Sense Media wrote positively, stating: "is as careful a combination of ingredients as it is possible to package [sic]. Everything is at the fairy tale level, which means we never dwell on troubling realities". Paul Byrnes of the Sydney Morning Herald said: "The script is so lazy it snores, and Wayne Wang directs like he walked onto the wrong set – true enough, in its way." Rich Cline of the webzine Film Threat reviewed Maid in Manhattan positively. Cline wrote: "When we catch ourselves sighing at the end, we get mad that we've fallen for this same old formula all over again. But mad in a nice way." Roger Ebert wrote that the film is a "skillful, glossy, formula picture, given life by the appeal of its stars".

Charles Passy of The Atlanta Journal-Constitution gave it a negative review, writing: "Instead of a fairy tale, we have a tale told without imagination. It's Cinderella gone stale." Andrew Chase of Killer Movie Reviews, however, was more positive. Chase wrote: "Leave reality at the concession stand along with your $20 for popcorn, candy and a large drink". Derek Adams of Time Out wrote: "Talented individuals labour over the contrivances in this lightweight romance, and if the result's fluff, at least it's painless."

Lopez's casting in the film sparked some debate. Variety commented that "[m]aking the maid a Latina is certainly realistic but never quite avoids the suggestion that upward mobility is best achieved through marriage into Anglo society". Fade to Black and White: Interracial Images in Popular Culture (2009) author Erica Chito Childs noted aspects of the film to expose the objective sides of a biracial relationship using the "symbolic roles of maid and politician". Writer Betty Kaklamanidou praised Lopez's casting in the film which "proved that a Latin actress can move away from stereotypical supporting roles and effectively become the center of a romantic narrative".

=== Accolades ===
Year	Award	Category	Recipient(s)	Result	Ref
2003	35th NAACP Image Awards	Outstanding Actress in a Motion Picture	Jennifer Lopez	Nominated	
2003	Imagen Awards	Best Actress	Jennifer Lopez	Nominated	
2003	Teen Choice Awards	Choice Movie Actress – Comedy	Jennifer Lopez	Nominated	
2003	Teen Choice Awards	Choice Movie Liar	Jennifer Lopez	Nominated	
2003	Teen Choice Awards	Choice Movie Lip lock	Jennifer Lopez and Ralph Fiennes	Nominated	
2003	23rd Golden Raspberry Awards	Worst Actress	Jennifer Lopez	Nominated	

== Spin-off ==
ABC announced in August 2008 that it would be adapting the film to a television series, with Lopez producing. Chad Hodge was hired as a script writer. In 2009, Sony Pictures Television indicated the spin-off was a put pilot.

== Telenovela version ==
Telemundo and Sony Pictures Television were co-producing a telenovela based on the movie called Una Maid en Manhattan, starring Litzy and Eugenio Siller. As of November 29, 2011, the telenovela was airing on Telemundo weeknights at 8pm/7pm central.
