= List of What I Like About You episodes =

The following is a list of episodes of the television show What I Like About You. The series aired on The WB from September 20, 2002, to March 24, 2006, with 86 episodes produced spanning four seasons.

== Series overview ==
Season	Episodes	Originally released	
Season	Episodes	First released	Last released
1	22	September 20, 2002	May 9, 2003
2	22	September 11, 2003	May 7, 2004
3	24	September 17, 2004	May 20, 2005
4	18	September 16, 2005	March 24, 2006

== Episodes ==
=== Season 1 (2002–03) ===
No. overall	No. in season	Title	Directed by	Written by	Original release date	Prod. code	Viewers (millions)
1	1	"The Pilot"	Gary Halvorson	Dan Schneider & Wil Calhoun	September 20, 2002	#475-352	3.72
When Holly's father gets a new job that involves moving to Japan, she makes an effort to stay in New York with her older sister Valerie by transforming herself into the perfect roommate. Unfortunately, nearly all of Holly's attempts go awry and it begins to look like she might have to resign herself to moving to Japan.
2	2	"Spa Day"	Gary Halvorson	Dan Schneider	September 27, 2002	#175-602	3.95
When Holly's plans to spend a day at a spa with Val clash with her appointment to get her picture taken with JC Chasez from N*Sync, she sets out to do both at the same time. Meanwhile, Jeff and Gary compete to see who is in better physical shape.
3	3	"Roommates"	Gary Halvorson	Wil Calhoun	October 4, 2002	#175-601	3.25
Val has trouble adjusting to Holly's carefree attitude, so she makes the teen follow a strict set of rules spelled out on paper called GRC (Good Roommate Chart). However, Holly breaks the rules when she and Gary go into Val's room to retrieve a DVD and are caught by Val when she comes home early.
4	4	"The Teddy Bear"	Shelley Jensen	Hayes Jackson	October 11, 2002	#175-605	3.21
Holly and Val fight over ownership of a teddy bear from their childhood until they agree to give the toy to a child who lives downstairs named Josie (Abigail Breslin) who winds up messing around with it. Meanwhile, Jeff and Gary try to fix Val's armoire, but end up upsetting Val with what they do.
5	5	"Cool Older Sister"	Shelley Jensen	Stacy Traub	October 18, 2002	#175-604	3.18
Val decides to stop nagging like a mom to Holly and give the teen more freedom, but her new strategy backfires when Holly tries to stay out all night without telling Val where she is going.
6	6	"The Parrot Trap"	Shelley Jensen	Lesley Wake Webster & Sarah McLaughlin	November 1, 2002	#175-606	2.83
Holly tries to impress a cute guy who's leading a protest against the alleged abuse of a parrot at a zoo with her passion for animal rights, but her fake zeal for the cause leads to an abduction of the bird. Meanwhile, Val attempts to play matchmaker for a woman who always eats alone at Jeff's restaurant, and the woman ends up kissing Jeff.
7	7	"Tankini"	Gary Halvorson	Rich Kaplan	November 8, 2002	#175-608	3.24
Gary feels left out when an old female friend Samantha (Chelsea Brummet) comes to visit Holly, but Holly gets a surprise when she catches the pair making out. Meanwhile, Jeff is bummed when he discovers that Val still sleeps in a sweater from an ex-boyfriend, a high school football player named Steve. The episode is possibly a reference to Ian Ziering and Jennie Garth's relationship in the first season of Beverly Hills, 90210.
8	8	"Copy That"	Shelley Jensen	Steven Molaro	November 15, 2002	#175-609	2.93
Holly gets a job at a photocopy store and embarrasses herself when she tries to tell a co-worker (Penn Badgley) that she is not interested in him. Meanwhile, Val gets to work closely with her boss on a big project, but she soon discovers that the woman has an unpleasant hygiene problem.
9	9	"Thanksgiving"	Mark Cendrowski	Kirker Butler	November 22, 2002	#175-607	3.31
Val and Holly plan a quiet Thanksgiving at home, but first they must find a way to ditch the annual gathering at their aunt's house. Meanwhile, Jeff and Gary set out to find the perfect turkey to share with Val and Holly.
10	10	"The Party"	Shelley Jensen	Story by : Jake Farrow; Teleplay by : Sung Min Suh & Ethan Banville	January 10, 2003	#175-610	3.09
Gary accompanies Holly to a college party after Holly swipes a cute guy's cell phone and calls him at his dorm to return it. At the party Gary finds out that the guy is a two-timer and tries to save Holly from getting involved with him. Meanwhile, Jeff and Val square off over a game of Scrabble.
11	11	"The Other Woman"	Sheldon Epps	Story by : Hayes Jackson; Teleplay by : Sarah McLaughlin & Lesley Wake Webster	January 17, 2003	#175-611	3.19
Holly becomes pals with Jeff's ex-girlfriend Dana (Rebecca Gayheart), despite Jeff's warnings that such a relationship could be troublesome. Meanwhile, Gary saves the life of a real-estate magnate at a concert and receives an unusual reward.
12	12	"Girls Night Out"	Shelley Jensen	Stacy Traub	January 24, 2003	#175-612	3.02
Holly joins Val for a night on the town, but their evening turns when a guy who Holly likes ends up kissing Val. Gary confronts a former teacher who used to belittle him, who now works as a server at the bar they attend.
13	13	"The Cheerleading Incident"	Steve Zuckerman	Kirker Butler	January 31, 2003	#175-613	2.88
Val's attempt to be more spontaneous lands her in an embarrassing costume and an awkward situation with Jeff's mom (Nancy Lenehan). To get on Jeff's mom's good side Val takes her and Holly to a restaurant. Jeff's mom is inspired by Val's spontaneity and decides to leave her husband. Holly and Gary each claim ownership of a free digital-music player called the "iBop". Holly gives it to Gary when she thinks it is broken only to find out that it is not broken after all.
14	14	"The Game"	Steve Zuckerman	Steven Molaro	February 7, 2003	#175-614	3.68
Holly advises Val to use dirty tactics against another employee, Lauren, who is competing with Val for a coveted promotion. Gary freaks out after attending a sideshow in the city.
15	15	"Valentine's Day"	Shelley Jensen	Lesley Wake Webster & Sarah McLaughlin	February 14, 2003	#175-615	3.17
Holly thinks that Jeff will propose to Val on Valentine's Day. Meanwhile, a nervous Gary begs Holly to double date with him after he asks out a beautiful girl. Holly gives in and goes on a 'not date', as she calls it, with Henry.
16	16	"Holly's First Job"	Gerry Cohen	Phil Baker & Drew Vaupen	February 21, 2003	#175-603	2.63
Jeff hires Holly to work at his restaurant, but the teen's clumsiness aggravates her co-workers and tests the owner's patience. Meanwhile, a bored Gary tries to spend time with Val but ends up getting on her nerves.
17	17	"The Breakup"	Shelley Jensen	Hayes Jackson	February 28, 2003	#175-616	3.04
Val breaks up with Jeff after he says he does not want to get married, and she tries to bury her pain under a veneer of optimism. Exhausted with Val's enthusiasm, Holly tries to get her sister to drop the act and face up to her pain.
18	18	"Dude, Where's Val's Car?"	Shelley Jensen	Story by : Sarah McLaughlin & Lesley Wake Webster; Teleplay by : Warren Bell	March 7, 2003	#175-617	3.08
Holly ditches school with Henry (Michael McMillian) and borrows Val's car, but the vehicle soon disappears. Meanwhile, Gary helps Jeff's restaurant career and expects free food from his pal in return.
19	19	"Loose Lips"	Sheldon Epps	Kirler Butler & Steven Molaro	April 4, 2003	#175-618	2.75
Holly encourages Val to socialize with her co-workers, but a night out with them puts Val in a compromising position with her boss, Vic. Meanwhile, Jeff meets an attractive woman (Anne-Marie Johnson), only to learn that she is Gary's mother.
20	20	"The Fix Up"	Shelley Jensen	Story by : Nahnatchka Khan; Teleplay by : Hayes Jackson & Stacy Traub	April 25, 2003	#175-619	2.70
Frustrated by Val's withering social life, Holly disregards Henry's vague warning and sets her sister up with his handsome doctor brother, Noah (Cameron Mathison). Meanwhile, Gary competes with his girlfriend Jill when she is hired as a waitress at Jeff's restaurant.
21	21	"Tyler v. World"	Shelley Jensen	Alexandra Rushfield & Jennifer Konner	May 2, 2003	#175-621	2.60
A neighbor discovers that Val violated a lease agreement and the infraction might cost Holly her residency in the building. Meanwhile, Gary feels slighted by an inexpensive birthday present from Holly. Absent: Simon Rex as Jeff
22	22	"The Talk"	Shelley Jensen	Caryn Lucas	May 9, 2003	#175-620	2.40
Val lectures Holly about sex, but a chance encounter with Jeff makes her look like a hypocrite. Meanwhile, Gary keeps ditching Holly to spend time with his girlfriend. Last appearance of Simon Rex as Jeff

=== Season 2 (2003–04) ===
No. overall	No. in season	Title	Directed by	Written by	Original release date	Prod. code	Viewers (millions)
23	1	"I Love You...Soon"	Shelley Jensen	Caryn Lucas & Wil Calhoun	September 11, 2003	#177-401	2.87
Holly tries to help Henry overcome his jealousy of Vince, an eccentric older guy who works as a bike messenger for Harper and Diggs, but she makes matters worse when she accidentally tells Henry that she loves him. Meanwhile, back at the office, Val finds herself attracted to Peter, her handsome and charming new boss.
24	2	"Boys' Club"	Shelley Jensen	Kirker Butler	September 18, 2003	#177-402	2.56
Holly begins to feel stressed with all the things she has to keep up with and ends up accidentally abandoning Henry when he gets his wisdom teeth removed. Meanwhile, Val gets upset with her boss's business antics and the new boys' club atmosphere that the business has taken on. Eventually Val takes matters into her own hands and quits. Absent: Nick Zano as Vince
25	3	"When Holly Met Tina"	Shelley Jensen	Amy Engelberg & Wendy Engelberg	September 25, 2003	#177-403	1.88
In order to help Val get her first client since starting her own public relations firm, Holly becomes friends with the client's troubled teenage daughter, Tina, who believes that she is pregnant. When she was caught with the unopened test by her mom, Holly takes the blame for the test by saying it is hers. Meanwhile, Lauren distracts Peter when she and Val find themselves in competition with this former boss of theirs for the new account. First Appearance of Allison Munn as Tina. Absent: Nick Zano as Vince
26	4	"The Loft"	Shelley Jensen	Rosalind Moore	October 2, 2003	#177-404	2.51
When Holly gets annoyed with Val and her work space, Val looks at other places for her office. Holly finds another place in the same building that Tina lives in but the owner (Terry Rhoads) will not let them have it. After they reunite him with his daughter (which does not go too well), he still refuses to let Val and Holly have his loft, but he offers them another loft in the same building. Absent: Stephen Dunham as Peter
27	5	"Like a Virgin (Kinda)"	Gary Halvorson	Steven Molaro	October 9, 2003	#177-405	1.99
When Holly learns that Henry has already lost his virginity she is shocked. She and Tina go and search the city frantically for the girl (Megan Fox) that 'soiled' Henry. Meanwhile, Lauren fakes her birthday so that Val will take the day off to relax and have fun. Absent: Stephen Dunham as Peter
28	6	"No More Mr. Nice Guy"	Shelley Jensen	Lesley Wake Webster	October 16, 2003	#177-406	2.17
Val accuses Holly of spending more time with Vince than Henry when Vince helps her set up Val's barbecue on the terrace. Holly and Vince fall asleep, and Holly wakes up in Vince's arms. Although it seems (to Val and everyone else) that they had sex, Holly assures them that they did not and she realizes that she has feelings for Vince. Absent: Leslie Grossman as Lauren
29	7	"I'm Sorry, So Sorry"	Shelley Jensen	Nancy Steen	October 23, 2003	#177-407	2.19
Tina's boyfriend Cal invites everyone up to his condo in the mountains for a ski trip on the weekend, but cancels when he and Tina get into a fight. When Cal makes the offer again to everyone except Tina, Holly has trouble deciding whether to go or to stay with her friend. Meanwhile, Val and Lauren get into a fight because Lauren's new boyfriend likes Val better and invites her out for drinks.
30	8	"Partially Obstructed View"	Gary Halvorson	Jeff Bushell	October 30, 2003	#177-408	2.3
Holly and Tina plan a girls' night out while Henry and Gary plan a boys' night out; when the girls run into Vince, he hooks them up with free front row tickets to The Strokes' concert. However, Holly finds herself unable to enjoy them when she learns that Henry stood in line for 12 hours to get tickets with terrible seats for the same concert. Meanwhile, Lauren sets Val and Peter up by forging a letter requesting tickets to a party for "New York's 10 Most Eligible Bachelors" of which Peter is ranked number 2.
31	9	"Absence Makes the Heart Grow...Never Mind"	Steve Zuckerman	Rosalind Moore	November 6, 2003	#177-409	1.92
When Henry is away at Princeton, Holly realizes that she loves him, and will go at any length to tell him in person. Things go wrong when Holly takes a train to Princeton and Henry takes the train to Holly's house. Meanwhile, while on a business trip, Val winds up getting the hotel room next door to Peter's, and they wind up kissing.
32	10	"The Odd Couple"	Steve Zuckerman	Caryn Lucas & Wil Calhoun	November 13, 2003	#177-410	2.7
When Henry moves out of his parents' apartment because of a disagreement between him and his dad, he moves into Vince's apartment, making Holly feel confused because she thinks she has feelings for Vince as well. Meanwhile, Lauren gets Val to go with her to a speed dating place to find Val a boyfriend. Last appearance of Stephen Dunham as Peter
33	11	"Regarding Henry"	Philip Charles MacKenzie	Amy Engelberg & Wendy Engelberg	November 20, 2003	#177-411	2.20
After Henry overhears Holly discussing her feelings about Vince with Val, he quickly takes off and ignores all her phone calls. Afraid that she has lost Henry for good, Holly scours the city looking for answers while Val — who is angry at Holly for disregarding her advice to give Henry some space — refuses to help.
34	12	"The Incredible Shrinking Group"	Rich Correll	Steven Molaro & Kirker Butler	January 9, 2004	#177-412	2.37
Holly and Gary's friendship is put to the test when Holly asks Gary to meet her with Henry at the movies. Meanwhile, after discovering that she ate seven Mounds bars and woke up with chocolate cake in her cleavage, Val decides it is time to go on a no-sugar diet with Lauren as her partner.
35	13	"The Hospital"	Shelley Jensen	Caryn Lucas & Wil Calhoun	January 16, 2004	#177-413	2.61
Holly fakes a package for Vince to deliver, but he ends up in the hospital after getting hit by a car during the delivery. When Holly tries to confess, she blames Tina instead. Gary hits on an attractive nurse while Val and Lauren fight over a cute doctor. Vince and Holly kiss.
36	14	"Your Cheatin' Heart"	Shelley Jensen	Lesley Wake Webster	January 23, 2004	#177-414	3.01
Holly makes sure Henry has moved on before kissing Vince again. When she goes to tell Vince that they can now be together, Holly finds him with another girl. Val bumps into her high school ex-boyfriend Rick who now has a fiance. Lauren accuses Val of still having feelings for Rick but Val denies it.
37	15	"Sky Rink Sucks"	Steve Zuckerman	Caryn Lucas & Wil Calhoun	January 30, 2004	#177-415	3.22
While planning Gary's birthday, Holly and Vince run into Gary's old girlfriend Jill, who is supposedly in France. They argue if they should tell Gary. Absent: Michael McMillian as Henry
38	16	"Lunar Eclipse of the Heart"	Steve Zuckerman	Jeff Bushell	February 6, 2004	#177-416	2.96
Holly throws a "lunar eclipse" party trying to make Vince jealous of her date who happens to be Gary's boss. Val applies for a job at a PR company without telling her only employee Lauren.
39	17	"Val and Holly's Not-Boyfriends"	Peter Bonerz	Caryn Lucas & Wil Calhoun	February 13, 2004	#177-417	2.97
Vince's grandfather dies, so Holly takes care of Vince and receives a "second hug". Meanwhile Tina and Gary have a moment in the snow. Val meets her old high school sweetheart again who had an epiphany after a near death experience. Absent: Michael McMillian as Henry
40	18	"The Interview"	Rich Correll	Sung Suh	February 20, 2004	#177-418	2.98
Holly and Vince visit Coney Island which makes Holly miss her Columbia interview. Lauren's doctor boyfriend, Brad, gets the giggles when he gets intimate with Lauren for the first time. This annoys Lauren, but still they get engaged. Absent: Michael McMillian as Henry
41	19	"The Big Picture"	Steve Zuckerman	Kirker Butler	April 16, 2004	#177-419	2.39
Holly wants to work as a tour guide in Paris and needs to write an essay to apply. Val and Rick kiss on the balcony. Henry wins an award, but chooses not to attend the award ceremony to help Holly rewrite her essay when it is accidentally erased.
42	20	"Rollin' In It"	Shelley Jensen	Jeff Bushell	April 23, 2004	#177-421	2.53
Holly gets $2000 for her 18th birthday and plans to blow it on her birthday party. Val believes Holly is too irresponsible to handle this money and hides it to teach Holly a lesson; it works too well. Lauren's fiancé breaks up with her after he catches her rolling in Holly's money, and Holly eventually learns of Val's "evil plot" from Lauren.
43	21	"The Anti-Prom"	Gary Halvorson	Steven Molaro & Lesley Wake Webster	April 30, 2004	#177-420	2.95
Holly, Gary and Tina throw an anti-prom party since they do not have dates for the real prom. Val receives a wedding invitation to Rick and Julie's wedding, but cannot decide if she should go or not. During an argument between Holly and Val, Henry overhears that Holly still has feelings for him.
44	22	"The Second Season Finale"	Shelley Jensen	Caryn Lucas & Wil Calhoun	May 7, 2004	#177-422	2.59
Holly gets her internship to Paris, but is unexpected kissed by both Henry and Vince. However, she leaves for Paris undecided who she wants to be with. Val, unable to take Holly to the airport because she has gotten sick, receives an unexpected visit from Rick, who confesses he could not marry Julie because he still has feelings for Val.

=== Season 3 (2004–05) ===
No. overall	No. in season	Title	Directed by	Written by	Original release date	Prod. code	Viewers (millions)
45	1	"Europe Was So Much More Fun"	Shelley Jensen	Caryn Lucas	September 17, 2004	#177-951	3.30
Holly returns home from Paris with Ben, a British musician. Her former boyfriends, Vince and Henry, realize they have lost Holly. While Henry says goodbye to Holly one last time before leaving for Princeton, Vince pretends to not care about Holly anymore. Meanwhile, Val, who has spent the summer with Rick, takes a pregnancy test and Rick proposes to her.
46	2	"The Longest Night Of The Year"	Shelley Jensen	Marco Pennette	September 24, 2004	#177-952	2.53
Holly moves to Gary and Vince's apartment with Ben after Val tells her that Ben can not live in the loft with them. However, Holly is uncomfortable with sleeping in the same bed as Ben for the first time. Holly forces Val to talk to Rick again.
47	3	"The Not-So Simple Life"	Shelley Jensen	Amy Engelberg & Wendy Engelberg	October 1, 2004	#177-953	2.54
Holly pays for Ben to perform at a club (where Jesse McCartney is performing too), risking their relationship because she is too "pushy". Meanwhile, Rick asks Lauren to help him shop for a ring for Val.
48	4	"God Help The Mister"	Brian K. Roberts	Lesley Wake Webster	October 8, 2004	#177-954	2.94
Val complains about Holly not being serious enough about being Val's maid of honor. Gary chases after a friend of Tina's (Tamyra Gray) who teaches a dance class.
49	5	"Split Ends"	Steve Zuckerman	Peter Marc Jacobson & Caryn Lucas	October 15, 2004	#177-955	2.72
Holly disapproves of Tina's pursue of a relationship with her boss who is married and the two fight. Meanwhile Holly is trying to earn money to buy Val's wedding present by auditioning for the part to appear on a Herbal Essences commercial where she is beaten by Jadyn Maria (who was featured in the commercial in real life).
50	6	"Three Little Words"	Leslie Kolins Small	David Windsor & Casey Johnson	October 22, 2004	#177-957	2.43
Holly thinks she made a big mistake by not being honest with Ben about his new song, only to find out he has not been totally honest himself, but eventually tells him that she loves him. Val's got some issues with the furniture Rick brings over.
51	7	"Ghost Of A Chance"	Steve Zuckerman	Rosalind Moore	October 29, 2004	#177-956	3.10
Holly drops out of college and starts to work for Gary's singer girlfriend Danielle (Tamyra Gray) as a manager. Val and Lauren visit a nude farm.
52	8	"Gift Of The Mutton"	Steve Zuckerman	Peter Marc Jacobson	November 5, 2004	#177-958	2.30
Holly get jealous of the groupie women Ben takes on stage and she tries to make him jealous too. Vince volunteers to help her and ends up kissing Holly. Rick's mother, who does not like Val, visits and Val tries to fix her her favorite dinner of mutton stew.
53	9	"We'll Miss Gittle, A Little"	Steve Zuckerman	Marco Pennette	November 12, 2004	#177-959	2.83
The preparations for Val's wedding are not coming along very well and when her wedding dress gets lost, Holly and the gang try to get it back. Meanwhile Rick is spotted with his old fiancée Julie while supposedly being on a business trip.
54	10	"The Wedding: Part 1"	Shelley Jensen	Caryn Lucas	November 19, 2004	#177-960	2.88
Holly accidentally tells Val about Rick meeting his ex, Julie. To calm down Val, Holly tries to get the whole truth and talks to Julie, but finds out that Rick actually called her and not the other way around. Val is already on her way to the altar when Holly finally gets to tell her. Meanwhile, Vince and Tina have an affair.
55	11	"The Wedding: Part 2"	Shelley Jensen	Caryn Lucas	January 14, 2005	#177-961	2.74
Val stops the wedding at the last minute because Rick has some fears of commitment, but ends up blaming Holly for ruining her wedding. As a result, Holly almost accompanies Ben on his concert tour.
56	12	"How To Succeed In A Business Without Really Trying to Be a Lesbian"	Robert Krakower	Amy & Wendy Engelberg	January 21, 2005	#177-962	2.79
To cheer up Val and to give her a break from men, Holly takes Val to a lesbian bar. At the bar, Holly meets her boss who starts giving her preferential treatment because she believes Holly is also a lesbian. Jenny McCarthy stars as Michelle, a lesbian who helps Val get over Rick. Guest Star: Jenny McCarthy
57	13	"Don't Kiss The Messenger"	Peter Marc Jacobson	Lesley Wake Webster	January 28, 2005	#177-963	2.17
Val buys a bakery after Lauren confesses to her that she drove their PR business into the ground. Holly has a dream where Vince confesses his feelings for her and they kiss. Back in reality, Vince cuts in as Holly's date while Ben has to work and they reminisce about Paris.
58	14	"Sex & The Single Girls"	Shelley Jensen	Rosalind Moore	February 4, 2005	#177-964	2.78
Val and Lauren have a hard time attracting customers to their bakery, though Lauren finds an effective method with Gary's help. Vince does a great job messing with Holly's feelings towards him and Ben. Lauren tries to charm a food critic.
59	15	"Stupid Cupid"	Shelley Jensen	David Windsor & Casey Johnson	February 11, 2005	#177-965	3.18
Ben breaks up with Holly to give her a chance to explore her feelings towards Vince. To cheer up a grumpy Lauren on Valentine's Day, Val and Gary make up a secret admirer for her. Holly gets upset with Vince when she finds out he slept with Tina.
60	16	"Nobody's Perfect"	Steve Zuckerman	Peter Marc Jacobson & Marco Pennette	February 18, 2005	#177-966	3.00
Lauren lets Val down again by letting the bakery get robbed. Holly and Ben have their post breakup talk and Ben lets his frustrations out in a song about Holly. Absent: Allison Munn as Tina and Nick Zano as Vince
61	17	"Dangerous Liaisons"	Shelley Jensen	Scott Weinger & Peter Dirksen	February 25, 2005	#177-967	3.26
Holly deletes the whole gang from her cell phone when they fall in her disgrace one by one. Val meets an old high school liaison, former high-school bad boy turned plumber Todd (Luke Perry).
62	18	"Girls Gone Wild"	Peter Marc Jacobson	Michael McMillian	April 8, 2005	#177-968	2.22
Holly and Vince fight over the custody of their friends, which Holly tries to win by taking everybody but Vince to Mexico for spring break. However, Vince tags along and confesses to Holly that still wants to be more than friends. Val dates a guy (Bryce Johnson) who has a lot in common with her (i.e. just getting out of a bad relationship), only to discover he is still in high school. Guest starring Fran Drescher.
63	19	"Bad To The Scone"	Fred Savage	Amy Engelberg & Wendy Engelberg	April 15, 2005	#177-969	2.02
Val helps a homeless guy to keep him out of her TV commercial. Holly gives Ben a makeover to increase his chances with his new love interest.
64	20	"Working Girls"	Shelley Jensen	David Windsor & Casey Johnson	April 22, 2005	#177-970	2.33
Lauren hits on a son of a customer who died in the bakery after Val yelled at him. Tina gets a job alongside Holly by taking advantage of her female attributes. These actions make Val and Holly try to raise their respective friends' self-esteem after watching an episode of Gilligan's Island.
65	21	"Pranks A Lot"	Shelley Jensen	Story by : Ross Greenberg; Teleplay by : Nicole Fabian	April 29, 2005	#177-971	2.12
The gang plays pranks on each other and even Val joins in. Jennie Garth's daughter, Luca Bella Facinelli, appears as girl eating ice cream near Val's car.
66	22	"The Kid, The Cake, & The Chemistry"	Rebecca Baughman	Rosalind Moore	May 6, 2005	#177-972	1.89
Tina makes Holly confess that she is in love with Vince so Holly plans to tell Vince by throwing him a surprise party, but he brings his girlfriend to the party. Val dates a boring tax guy, but easily bonds with the man's 8-year-old son (Skyler Gisondo).
67	23	"My Boyfriend's Back"	Shelley Jensen	Lesley Wake Webster	May 13, 2005	#177-973	1.91
Holly wonders if she is even able to have a lasting relationship and visits Henry at Princeton for advice. When Vince hears about Holly's trip to Princeton, he runs after her to tell her how he feels. However, when Vince walks in on Henry and his new girlfriend, coincidentally also named Holly, he thinks that Henry and Holly have gotten together again. Val finally dates her high school one night stand Todd (Luke Perry) again.
68	24	"Enough Is Enough"	Shelley Jensen	Caryn Lucas	May 20, 2005	#177-974	1.94
Lauren and Gary compete against each other trying to charm Tina to earn her extra ticket to Italy. Upon learning that Rick and Julie got married after all, Val secretly falls apart (while keeping up a brave front around Holly) and after making a mysterious phone call, she gets drunk in Atlantic City and wakes up married to someone unexpected. Vince thinks Holly is together with Henry again and plans to leave for Florida while Holly stows away in his car in hopes of confessing her love to him.

=== Season 4 (2005–06) ===
No. overall	No. in season	Title	Directed by	Written by	Original release date	Prod. code	Viewers (millions)
69	1	"I Want My Baby Back"	Shelley Jensen	Caryn Lucas	September 16, 2005	#2T6551	2.86
Holly stows away in the backseat of Vince's car as he goes to Florida and they finally confess their love. After learning she has married her old boss Vic, Val wants out of her new marriage. Gary rents his loft to some trustworthy guys for a ridiculous high rent and has to stay at Tina's from now on.
70	2	"Surprise"	Steve Zuckerman	Scott Weinger & Peter Dirksen	September 23, 2005	#2T6552	2.19
Val tries to get Vic to sign the annulment papers, but he insists that they have a great thing going. Gary convinces Tina that there is a prowler on the loose in the neighborhood to be able to stay in her apartment. Vince quits his summer job in Florida to follow Holly back home.
71	3	"The Redo"	Leslie Kolins Small	Jim Reynolds	September 30, 2005	#2T6553	2.12
Holly and Vince have their first fight as a couple. Val starts to develop feelings for Vic again.
72	4	"I've Got A Secret"	Rebecca Baughman	Norma Safford Vela	October 7, 2005	#2T6554	2.11
Gary and Tina are attracted to each other, but do not tell one another. Holly and Vince fight over whether it is okay to share other people's secrets while being in a relationship. Val and Vic team up to set Lauren up with one of the firemen from Vic's squad but Lauren cannot take a moment from her internet relationship.
73	5	"The Perfect Date"	Shelley Jensen	Casey Johnson & David Windsor	October 14, 2005	#2T6555	1.98
Holly and Vince have an argument over a girl's phone number on Vince's phone and the anklet bracelet that Holly once got from Henry. Val goes out on a date with a guy named Charlie (Jason Priestley) to show Vic she does not want him, but Charlie starts to get clingy.
74	6	"Halloween"	Shelley Jensen	Amy Engelberg & Wendy Engelberg	October 28, 2005	#2T6556	2.37
Val has a hard time fighting off Charlie (Jason Priestley) and calls Vic for help. Holly is finally ready for her first time, but Gary frightens Vince with all the pressure that lies on him.
75	7	"Someone's in The Kitchen With Daddy"	Steve Zuckerman	Peter Marc Jacobson	November 4, 2005	#2T6557	2.53
Holly and Val's father, Jack, comes to visit, and Holly and Val compete to impress him. However, after catching Jack and his girlfriend's brother in a very awkward position, Jack is forced to come out of the closet, making the visit awkward for everybody. In the end, all the Tyler family secrets come out in the open and everyone hangs out as normal. Note: Mr. Tyler is played by Barry Bostwick from this episode on. In the pilot, he was played by Peter Scolari.
76	8	"Jazz Night"	Shelley Jensen	Nancy Steen	November 11, 2005	#2T6558	2.22
Val decides to go on a date with Vic during the Jazz Night at the bakery while Vic decides it is time to sign the annulment papers. Vince and Holly argue whether Vince has to do everything Holly says.
77	9	"Ground-Turkey-Hog Day"	Steve Zuckerman	Caryn Lucas	November 18, 2005	#2T6559	2.45
Still not sure about her feelings for Vic, Val suffers a setback when an old girlfriend, Bianca, buys Vic for a date night at a charity auction and has a whole bunch of "nudey stories" about her and Vic. Lauren is shocked to discover that her internet relationship is Val's ex-fiance and Julie's husband Rick, but that does not stop her from loving her internet "poker guy".
78	10	"For Love or Money"	Peter Marc Jacobson	Scott Weinger & Peter Dirksen	December 9, 2005	#2T6560	3.05
Vince is freaked out about Holly's paycheck being way bigger than his, so he gets a job a big real estate agency with the help of old high school girlfriend Robyn. Val gets clues from Vic about their special date that night, but is distracted by Lauren's situation with Rick and ends up missing her date with Vic.
79	11	"Coming Home"	Madeline Cripe	Nicole Fabian	January 27, 2006	#2T6561	2.37
Vince gets fired when Robyn finds him on the job making out with Holly, but Holly visits her and strikes a deal to let Vince get his job back. After Vic is injured during a big fire in Soho, Val wonders if she can handle worrying about Vic's job all the time and they end up confessing their love to each other.
80	12	"Desperate Girlfriends"	Steve Zuckerman	Amy Engelberg & Wendy Engelberg	February 3, 2006	#2T6562	1.97
Lauren lies about setting up a surprise birthday party for Val when Val becomes upset that Lauren is still seeing Rick. When Rick ends up in the hospital with a heart attack, Val is outraged when she learns the truth, forcing Holly to step in to help her work things out with Lauren. Meanwhile, Vic tries to find the perfect moment to ask Val an important question.
81	13	"The Other Women"	Dan Cortese	Nancy Steen	February 17, 2006	#2T6563	2.18
Val tries to win over Vic's mother Eileen, but learns that Eileen is a long-standing recovering alcoholic after Val "pushes her off the wagon." As a result, she tries to get Eileen back on the right path without Vic finding out. Holly thinks Vince is spending too much time at work with Robyn, who has been trying to steal Vince away.
82	14	"Your Money or Your Wife"	Shelley Jensen	Peter Marc Jacobson	February 24, 2006	#2T6564	2.24
Gary and Tina have their hands full keeping Holly and Vince out of each other's way until they give up. Val has trouble keeping an expensive promise to the fire department.
83	15	"Garden State"	Shelley Jensen	Ryan Harris	March 3, 2006	#2T6565	2.38
Holly, Lauren and Tina have girls night to comfort Holly after her breakup with Vince but the night ends up not being as comforting. After learning they are not legally married, Vic and Val discover different visions for their future together on their way to meet Vic's brothers.
84	16	"Friends & Lovers"	Leslie Kolins Small	Casey Johnson & David Windsor	March 10, 2006	#2T6566	1.74
Val and Vic try to have sex together, but keep getting interrupted. Holly struggles with her feelings after breaking up with Vince without Val, which is complicated when she and Lauren are arrested. Vince tells Holly that he has a job offer in Chicago and plans to move there.
85	17	"Now and Zen"	Rebecca Baughman	Norma Safford Vela	March 17, 2006	#2T6567	2.23
Vince learns that Holly was right about Robyn chasing after him and he thinks he messed up his relationship with Holly too much to fix it. Lauren treats the girls to a spa vacation before Val's wedding, but they have trouble leaving when the spa is locked down during a SWAT team search for two escaped convicts believed to be in the area.
86	18	"Finally..."	Shelley Jensen	Caryn Lucas	March 24, 2006	#2T6568	2.29
Escaping the spa on horseback, Val and Holly barely make it to the wedding on time where Val finally marries Vic. Gary and Tina finally accept their feelings for one another. Vince discards his plans to move to Chicago and surprises Holly at the reception to make up with her since he cannot imagine his life without her. Note: The song played at Vic and Val's wedding is The Beginning by Alice Peacock.
