= List of What I Like About You characters =

The following is a list of characters from the American TV series What I Like About You. The main characters are two sisters who live together in New York City, played by Amanda Bynes and Jennie Garth, who are polar opposites. In 2002, Teen People said that a distinctive aspect of the show was that "These characters aren't afraid to go the extra mile for a laugh."

== Tyler sisters ==
=== Holly Tyler ===
Holly Anne Tyler (portrayed by Amanda Bynes) is an unpredictable, somewhat in-your-face teenage girl who is high-spirited and spunky and has a tendency to impulsively do whatever pops into her head, regardless of the consequences. She unwittingly and unintentionally causes chaos despite usually having good intentions, but gradually becomes more mature as the series progressed. At the beginning of the series, Holly's father accepts a job in Japan, but agrees to allow Holly to stay with her older, more sophisticated, sister Val. Due to their contrasting personalities, she manages to turn Val's neat and orderly life upside down and inside out from the moment she first moves into her sister's apartment. The sisters manage to resolve their differences in order to live together and Holly becomes very dependent on Val to offer advice and to help her out of trouble.

During the series, Holly goes through several jobs. After a brief and extremely unsuccessful stint working at Jeff's restaurant, she finds work at a copy shop through her friend Gary. Subsequently, Val gets Holly a job at Harper & Diggs as a mail girl, where she remains until Val quits to open her own public relations firm. Holly eventually finds a stable job as a music manager, though the decision coincides with her decision to drop out of college, which becomes a longstanding issue in her family.

Holly goes through several romantic relationships throughout the series. She dates her first love, Henry Gibson, for nearly a year, but her feelings for Vince complicate matters, and the two break up. Although after the breakup, Holly begins to question whether she made the right decision to break up with Henry so soon. She fluctuates between both Henry and Vince, never fully committing to either of them, while maintaining feelings for both just as she leaves on a summer internship to Paris. While the three decide to wait until Holly returns from Paris before she chooses who she wants to be with, she unexpectedly returns from Europe with Ben, a British musician, as her new boyfriend under the mistaken impression that both Vince and Henry have moved on. She remains with Ben for six months until she accidentally responds to Ben's comment of loving her with "I love you, Vince." Realizing that she loves Vince, Holly and Ben break up.

After getting advice from Henry and several mishaps, Holly manages to confess her feelings to Vince and the two become a couple. Their relationship is strained when Vince gets a job from an ex-girlfriend, Robyn, who intends to pursue Vince romantically. They break up when Vince does not believe Holly and he accepts a job offer in Chicago, even after learning that Holly was right about Robyn. However, under the impression that they would not see one another again, Vince returns in the show's final episode and professes his love for Holly, uniting them once again. Holly was born in 1986 and is 16 at the start of the show and 20 at the end.

=== Valerie Tyler ===
Valerie "Val" Kelly Meladeo (née Tyler) (portrayed by Jennie Garth) is Holly's older sister, a young woman who expects everything to run exactly as planned to the last detail and takes all her responsibilities seriously. As a result, she can become stressed and frustrated very easily, particularly by Holly's impulsive behavior. Despite her uptight nature, she and Holly are very close and Holly often encourages Val to take more risks, to varying degrees of success. Initially, Val works for a public relations firm called Harper & Diggs. However, after becoming dissatisfied when her role in the company, she starts her own PR company with her co-worker and friend, Lauren. When their company falls through due to Lauren's irresponsibility, the two start a successful bakery, where Gary eventually works.

Like Holly, Val goes through several relationships in the series. Her first boyfriend during the series was Jeff, whom she dated for a year until he revealed that he did not want to get married. After their breakup, Val develops feelings for her boss Vic, though nothing happens between the two. However, she does end up having mixed feelings about her new boss Peter, but before a relationship could develop between the two, Peter leaves for Italy and disappears with no explanation. Val is later reunited with Rick, her old high school boyfriend who is engaged to Julie, a woman who had nothing in common with him. The day of Rick and Julie's wedding, Rick bails from the ceremony, realizing he has feelings for Val. Val and Rick become engaged, only to cancel the wedding after discovering Rick has commitment fears. Afterwards, Val starts developing feelings for her old high school fling, a plumber named Todd (played by Beverly Hills, 90210 alum Luke Perry).

Just as Val starts to get over Rick, she learns that Rick and Julie got married after all and becomes severely depressed and recklessly goes out partying all night. After a drunken night in Atlantic City, she dreams that she married the plumber only to wake up and learn that she had actually married Vic instead. Fearful of getting hurt again, Val refuses to accept being married to him, despite being attracted to him. She eventually accepts the sincerity of his love for her and reciprocates his feelings for her. After learning their original marriage was not valid since the officiant who married them was not licensed, they marry for real in the company of family and friends in the series finale.

Val was born in 1976, making her 10 years older than Holly. She is around 26 at the start of the series and 30 by the end.

== Supporting characters ==
=== Gary Thorpe ===
Gary Johann Thorpe (portrayed by Wesley Jonathan) is Holly's best friend throughout the series, eventually becoming best friends and roommates with Vince. He has a close relationship with his mother. Initially portrayed somewhat of a plain-clothes and dimwitted geek, even having unusual conspiracy theories such as that the pyramids are spaceships and that Stonehenge was one rock with many mirrors, Gary is known for being devoted to his friends and providing surprisingly, though bluntly delivered, insightful advice. Throughout the series, he becomes cooler and, like Holly, a more mature and capable individual. Aside from Holly and Val, Gary is the only other character to appear in all seasons of the show.

Gary goes through several jobs in the series, the first being an employee at a copy store where he finds Holly a job. Subsequently, Gary finds work as a salesperson at a clothing store and is eventually hired as an employee at Val and Lauren's bakery. Because of his business major and dedication to his job, Val promotes him to become the bakery's manager, much to Lauren's ire.

The beginning of the series hints that Gary had a slight crush on Val, indicated by actions such as visiting Val's home when he knew Holly wasn't there. His first serious girlfriend is Jill, the assistant to a millionaire businessman. The two date for a year, only for Jill to leave for Paris; Gary later learns that she lied about Paris just to break up with him. During the course of the series, Gary had mixed feelings about Tina, both hating and being attracted to her at times. This back and forth culminated in a kiss, shocking them both. The two decided to keep things the way they were between them, but when Tina began dating a police officer, Rubin, Gary showed signs of jealousy. In the series finale, Gary finally admits that he's in love with Tina and is sad now that it is too late to be with her, but it turns out that Tina feels the same way about him and the two end up kissing and get together at the end.

=== Vince ===
Vince (portrayed by Nick Zano) is a laid-back and attractive bike messenger who becomes friends with Holly towards the end of the first season and eventually becomes her love interest and boyfriend. He has taken care of himself since he was seventeen and lives in his own apartment, which he later shares with Gary, Henry (briefly), and Ben. Vince is on bad terms with his father and turned to his grandfather for support in their family. The two shared a close relationship and Vince was upset when his grandfather died. While Vince is not very perceptive, he is dedicated to his friends and generally understanding. However, he is known for having many previous girlfriends, much to Holly's discomfort in their relationship.

Shortly after meeting him, Holly begins to develop unwanted romantic feelings for Vince, even though she is dating Henry. Unaware of Holly's feelings for him, Vince becomes friends with Henry, which eventually strains the relationship between all three of them when Vince learns of Holly's feelings and begins to reciprocate. After Holly and Henry break up and Henry finds a new girlfriend, Holly attempts to pursue a relationship with Vince, but is disappointed to learn he was seeing other girls while he was waiting for her, and could not guarantee that a relationship between Holly and him would work out. When Vince hears that Holly receives an opportunity for a summer internship in Paris, he kisses her, but she rejects him and decides to go back to Henry. Vince surprises Holly by showing up on the plane, and the two spend some time together in Paris off-screen.

At the beginning of Season 3, Vince and Henry are in competition with each other for Holly, but are disappointed to discover after her summer internship in Paris that she has returned with a new boyfriend, Ben. Not wanting to make her feel guilty, Vince tells Holly he cannot commit to a relationship and he is happy for her. While keeping his feelings for Holly hidden, Vince's womanizing ways wane overtime, as he is often oblivious when girls hit on him. Vince attempts to get together with Holly after she breaks up with Ben. However, after learning he slept with Tina on the night before Val's wedding to Rick, she furiously refuses him and has difficulty forgiving him. Holly's wavering feelings and their constant arguments drive Vince to take a summer job in Florida, where Holly follows him and confesses her feelings. They become a couple, strained only when Vince's new boss and ex-girlfriend Robyn tries to steal him away. Oblivious and unwilling to believe Holly's story about Robyn's intentions, they break up. Vince decides to take a job in Chicago, even after learning that Holly was right about Robyn, but changes his mind and reconciles with Holly at Val's wedding.

=== Lauren ===
Lauren (portrayed by Leslie Grossman) is Val's best friend and frequent business partner. She is bossy and impatient, and frequently comes off as highly self-centered, but deeply values her friendships with Val and Holly, offering them advice with mixed reception and equally mixed results. Her relationship with the Tyler sisters is generally reciprocated, with Val usually offering more effective help to Lauren when she is in trouble. Throughout the series, numerous details have been given regarding Lauren's rather unusual tastes and sordid past, including robbing a laundromat after being convinced by her boyfriend and being a size-16 "big-boned and jelly-like" girl in fourth grade before going to a camp to lose weight. She first appears in season one and becomes a regular character in the rest of the series.

Initially introduced as Val's co-worker at Harper & Diggs coming from the company's Chicago branch, Lauren constantly competes with Val for promotions by superficially trying to impress their boss, Vic. When Val chooses to quit Harper & Diggs to start her own PR company, Lauren joins Val as her partner, though the company fails due to Lauren's irresponsibility. The two women subsequently open a successful bakery, though Lauren is irate when she learns that Gary, who has demonstrated himself to be a responsible employee, is promoted to be the bakery's manager by Val.

Throughout the series, Lauren has so-so luck with relationships. At one point, she is engaged to a doctor despite not loving him, but their engagement was broken off when he caught Lauren rolling in a pile of cash belonging to Holly. Lauren later starts an online affair with an unknown married man, revealed to be Val's ex-fiancé Rick (who was married to his ex Julie). They are shocked to realize they have been corresponding with each other romantically online, but pursue the relationship offline, much to Val's anger and disapproval when Lauren finally confesses after Rick has a heart attack when Lauren was about to have sex with him. She eventually becomes romantically involved with Marcus, a firefighter and friend of Vic.

=== Tina Haven ===
Tina Haven (portrayed by Allison Munn) is an outspoken and blunt girl who becomes Holly's closest friend. While she has a reputation for being promiscuous and sleeping with guys, she stresses she's "not a slut", but does not hesitate to use her attractiveness to get promotions, much to Holly's displeasure and disapproval. Her mother, Judith, a child psychologist and author, rarely gives Tina proper attention and frequently spends more time with her current boyfriend. Tina displays a talent for singing, as shown in a few episodes such as "Split Ends", "Jazz Night", and "Finally".

Tina meets Holly when Val is trying to attract Tina's mother as a client for her PR firm and suggests it would be a good idea for Holly and Tina to meet. During their meeting, Tina is caught by Judith with a pregnancy test (the test turned out negative); Holly stuck up for Tina, claiming the test was hers. The two became best friends with a few bumps along the way. The Tyler sisters become Tina's neighbors after moving into the same building and Tina eventually welcomes Gary and Vince as her roommates.

Like Lauren, most of Tina's romantic relationships are unsuccessful. During the series, she has a love-hate relationship with Gary that is reciprocated, though they are able to tolerate and are somewhat attracted to one another. Tina has a long-standing crush on her boss at a veterinarian's office where she was an assistant and seriously considers pursuing him. However, she is left heart-broken after she learns that her boss has gotten back together with his separated wife. On the night before Val's wedding to Rick, Tina goes to Vince for comfort, who at the same time is distraught about Holly and Ben, but the two of them end up sleeping together. While she and Vince agree to keep the incident a secret, Tina blurts it out to Holly after mistakenly believing that Holly had already learned the truth from Vince and temporarily damages their relationship. Later, Tina and Gary share an unexpected kiss (which wasn't their first) that left them both confused about each other, but the two decided to keep their current relationship. Tina eventually manages to find a boyfriend in Officer Rubin, a police officer for the NYPD. However, Tina most likely breaks up with him at Val's wedding so that she and Gary can be together.

=== Vic Meladeo ===
Vic Meladeo (portrayed by Dan Cortese) is introduced as the boss at Harper & Diggs, the public relations firm where Val and Lauren work. After Val breaks up with Jeff, she develops some unwanted feelings for Vic, which lead to the two almost kissing, news Holly accidentally spreads around the office. When Val talks to Vic about the kiss, they end up kissing for real, but a relationship never happens. He leaves the company, apparently for California, but at some point returned to become a firefighter in New York. Vic is a recurring character during the first season and returns as a regular character in the fourth season.

Three years after leaving Harper & Diggs, Val is reunited with Vic in Atlantic City, where after a night of heavy drinking, they got married in a wedding chapel. Though Val is adamantly against being married to Vic, he refuses to annul their marriage because he feels that their relationship was meant to be and he sincerely loves her. Her feelings toward him gradually reciprocate and they finally kiss on Thanksgiving Day, the day that Val and Rick's wedding fell apart.

After finding out while watching the news that their marriage was invalid because the minister/Elvis impersonator that married them wasn't an ordained minister, Val and Vic decide to get married for real. Initially, they go to get married at City Hall, but eventually decide on a real wedding with family and friends present. Though a search for a criminal delays Val and Holly leaving a spa and getting to the wedding in time, Val and Holly manage to make it to the wedding hall where Val and Vic finally get married.

=== Henry Gibson ===
Henry Gibson (portrayed by Michael McMillian) is Holly's first love and first boyfriend. He becomes friends with Gary and Vince and is known to be a likable, insightful, and intelligent person. While he is socially awkward and shy at first, he gradually becomes more assertive and confident, especially through his relationship with Holly.

Holly and Val first meet Henry in a men's bathroom at B-91 during a girls' night out where Val, playing wingman for Holly to attract a guy, is kissed by Holly's intended target. Distraught, Holly tries to escape Val in the men's bathroom only for Val to follow her in there. There, Henry almost uses the bathroom in front of them as Holly and Val are talking. Val attempts to mend Holly's broken heart by having her meet Henry, whom Holly politely refuses. However, so that Gary would not be alone and dumped by his girlfriend on Valentine's Day, Holly agrees to going a fake date with Henry (as part of a double date with Gary and Jill). During the date, Henry impresses Holly with his hypothetical proposal of marriage to her (he said he would propose to Holly at a garbage dump, so when she felt sad, he could remind her of the event to cheer her up). The two became a couple.

Henry becomes jealous of Holly's friend Vince, who Holly explained that he shouldn't be jealous of which caused her to blurt out (and eventually take back) "I love you." When he learns that Holly has feelings for Vince, Henry breaks up with her and eventually moved on with a girl named Kate. Henry and Holly retain a friendly relationship, though she worries about Henry's happiness as a result of her own feelings for Vince, and he continues to help her out, particularly when he helps her rewrite an essay to get a summer internship in Paris. Henry ends up breaking up with Kate when she questions his feelings for Holly after they overhear Holly and Val fighting over Holly's feelings for both Henry and Vince. Still having feelings for her, Henry kisses Holly twice before her summer trip to Paris. He and Vince wait the entire summer for Holly to return and finally choose between the two. However, his hopes of winning her back are dashed when she returns with a new boyfriend, Ben, a musician from Britain. Henry feels betrayed, and angrily tells Holly he never wants to see her again. The two later manage to part amicably before he leaves for Princeton, when Holly tells him that he is her first love. When she sees him again, Henry has settled into college life, joking somewhat darkly that his friends do not call, and dates a girl coincidentally named Holly.

=== Jeff Campbell ===
Jeff Campbell (portrayed by Simon Rex) is Val's first boyfriend in the series and the manager of his father's restaurant. He eventually becomes the manager of the restaurant B-91, where Holly, Gary and Henry hung out at near the end of the first season. As well as supporting Val, he frequently helps Holly and Gary, often with a more relaxed attitude than Val.

Jeff and Val share a relatively stable and happy relationship for a year until he reveals his feelings about marriage to Val after a date on Valentine's Day, which Val (thanks to Holly) mistakenly thought that Jeff was going to propose to her. However, Jeff reveals that he never wants to get married, upsetting Val. The two break up, which emotionally damages Val for a long time. However, after Val explains to Holly why it is important to wait until she's emotionally ready to have sex and that "sex is not a game", Val and Jeff sleep together, which Holly saw as being hypocritical. Val decides it would be best that they do not see each other anymore until they could "do it without doing it." After the first season, he never appears in any more episodes and is scarcely mentioned.

== Recurring ==
Ben Sheffield (portrayed by David de Lautour) is Holly's British boyfriend for most of the third season. The two met in England when he was performing his music in a pub where Holly traveled during her summer in Paris where she was working to be a tour guide. Sparks flew, and soon after, Ben joined Holly on a flight to New York. When Henry and Vince saw Holly kissing Ben at the airport, they were nevertheless shocked that Holly had moved on while they were in New York waiting for her to return. While Henry manages to part amicably with Holly, Vince remains jealous and unhappy that Holly has chosen to be with someone else entirely. To further strain matters, Holly manages to convince Gary and Vince to reluctantly allow Ben to live with them in their apartment. Much to Ben and Holly's obliviousness, Vince encourages Holly to break up with Ben frequently, though with no success. Ben and Holly break up after only six months together after Holly accidentally says "I love you too, Vince" instead of "I love you too, Ben." After the breakup, he writes a song about their breakup called "Holly Tyler Sucks" which Holly wasn't fond of. The two managed to remain friends despite their breakup and he continues to live in Vince and Gary's apartment. Ben disappears after the third season. According to Gary, he was out for the summer, but he never returned. It is presumed he went back to Britain.

Rick (portrayed by Edward Kerr) is Val's old boyfriend and fiancé. When she meets him again by chance, he is engaged to Julie, a woman he has very little in common with. Rick and Val's feelings for one another resurface and he leaves Julie on their wedding day to be with Val, whom he proposes to. However, shortly before his wedding to Val, Holly learns that Rick initiated a meeting with Julie, forcing Val to question Rick's intention on the day of their wedding. When he reveals he is afraid of commitment, their wedding is called off. Val later learns that he ended up marrying Julie after all; devastated, she spends a whole night drinking and marries Vic by accident. In the meantime, Lauren unwittingly pursues an online affair with Rick, which ends when he gets a heart attack while she was making love to him.

Jack Tyler (portrayed by Barry Bostwick; in "Pilot", Mr. Tyler was played by Peter Scolari) is Holly and Val's father who moves to Japan, leaving Holly in the care of Val. His wife died at some point, but he loved her dearly and regards her as his soulmate. When he returns to visit his daughters three years after moving to Japan, he reveals that he is gay and in a relationship with Toshi Yamamora (portrayed by Kipp Shiotani), a Japanese restaurateur and Jack's business partner. After learning that Val has married Vic, he encourages her not to annul her marriage because she fears getting her heart broken again since he can see that she and Vic do love one another. As an ongoing joke, when Jack sees Vince he calls him either Henry or Ben.

Robyn Marquette (portrayed by Sara Erikson) is an ex-girlfriend of Vince who hires Vince as part of her real estate agency. She has a degree in Vassar and her father owns the real estate company. A manipulative and confident woman, she schemes to break up Holly and Vince in order to pursue Vince for herself. When Holly learns the truth, Vince does not believe her, which strains their relationship enough for them to break up. Vince eventually learns the truth, having been genuinely oblivious to Robyn's intentions, when he quits her company to in order to pursue a job offer in Chicago. However, he feels unable to reconcile with Holly, believing that his decision not to trust her regarding Robyn has damaged their relationship beyond repair.

Jill (portrayed by Anicka Haywood) is Gary's girlfriend, whom he initially met when he saved her boss, a billionaire, from choking. In order to break up with Gary, she lies about going to Paris, which Holly discovers on Gary's birthday. Gary eventually confronts her with the truth and forgives Holly for not telling him immediately.

Kate (portrayed by Danneel Harris) is Henry's girlfriend after he breaks up with Holly and moves on. They originally met as students applying for Princeton. Throughout Henry's relationship with Kate, Holly constantly worried if Henry had genuinely moved on despite initially encouraging the relationship so that Holly could pursue Vince. Kate and Henry break up when she questions if he still has feelings for Holly, which he realized he did.

Ricki (portrayed by Minka Kelly) is an old flame of Vince, whom he briefly dated after their reunion, much to the consternation of Holly, who was still in love with him. Holly constantly grates on Ricki's lack of common sense. Ricki's older brother, Jonathan, runs into Holly when she is stranded in Florida and unwittingly brings her to Vince when he goes to meet Ricki, who has been causing trouble for their family.

Peter (portrayed by Stephen Dunham) is Val's boss at Harper & Diggs during the first half of the second season, taking over after Vic leaves. Unlike Vic, he displays a chauvinistic attitude, which upsets Val when he justifies his attitude by saying that Val does not understand how to conduct business with male clients. After quitting Harper & Diggs, Val ends up competing against him and her old company for clients. She has some mixed, somewhat romantic, feelings about him and is eventually pushed into going out on a date with him by Holly. However, when Val learns that Peter had an affair with his friend's wife, it seals Val's decision to not embark on a relationship with Peter. He disappears with the only explanation being he was going on a business trip to Europe, and is mentioned one last time during Val and Rick's first meeting at the Liberty Diner.

Danielle Johnson (portrayed by Tamyra Gray) is a dance major at NYU who is friends with Tina and starts dating Gary. After hearing Danielle sing Tina Turner's "Proud Mary," Holly decides to become a talent manager with Danielle as her first client and fashions her as "Danielle Dulay". However, Danielle is signed by a major label instead, to Holly's joy and disappointment. She breaks up with Gary after choosing to focus on more on her career.

Officer Rubin (portrayed by Scott Weinger) is a police officer, who interrogates Holly when she is mugged while she and Vince were arguing. He is briefly Tina's boyfriend and uses his authority to get a helicopter to help Tina and Lauren get to Val's wedding after he learns that the women are trapped at a spa. However, they part ways and Tina gets together with Gary.

Marcus (portrayed by Mark Weiler) is Vic's fire station buddy, who gets involved with Lauren. He is depicted as understanding, dependable, and good-hearted.

Todd (portrayed by Luke Perry, who was one of Jennie Garth's co-stars on Beverly Hills, 90210) is a plumber who went to Val's high school and had a one-night stand with her. Val becomes attracted to him again and briefly considers pursuing a relationship with him. However, after learning that Rick has married Julie, Val spends an entire night drinking. When she wakes up, she believes she has married Todd; however, this turns out to be a dream, though Val's relief quickly turns to shock when she wakes up and learns that she has actually married Vic.

Charlie (portrayed by Jason Priestley, also was a co-star of Jennie Garth's on Beverly Hills, 90210) is a stalker who goes out with Val when Val is trying to convince Vic that their marriage means nothing, though Charlie's presence actually ends up deepening Val's feelings for Vic. After telling him that she and Vic are siblings, Charlie proposes on the first day they meet. She eventually gets rid of Charlie when she tells him that she and Vic are married.
