= Divine Intervention (2007 film) =

- Directed by: Van Elder
- Written by: Van Elder
- Produced by: Lisa Dewitt; Van Elder
- Starring: Wesley Jonathan; Jazsmin Lewis; James Avery
- Cinematography: Jonathan Hall
- Edited by: Van Elder
- Production company: Bullz Eye Productions
- Distributed by: Bullz Eye Productions; Codeblack Films
- Release date: 30 November 2007
- Running time: 100 minutes
- Country: United States
- Language: English

Divine Intervention is a 2007 American romantic comedy-drama film directed by Van Elder, starring Wesley Jonathan, Jazsmin Lewis and James Avery.

== Cast ==
- Wesley Jonathan as Reverend Robert Gibbs
- Jazsmin Lewis as Divine Matthews
- James Avery as Reverend Clarence Matthews
- Laz Alonso as Deacon Wells
- Roz Ryan as Mother Candice
- Carl Gilliard as Deacon Grier
- Cynda Williams as Sister Grier
- Luenell as Sister Jones
- Reynaldo Rey as Deacon Jones
- Shang Forbes as Deacon Thomas
- Van Elder as usher

== Release ==
The film received a limited theatrical release on 30 November 2007.

== Reception ==
Frank Lovece of Film Journal International wrote a negative review of the film, while praising the performances of Avery, Ryan and Luenelle.

Sam Adams of the Los Angeles Times wrote that Elders "lingers on subsidiary diversions when he should be advancing the plot", and "even his establishing shots overstay their welcome".

Tim Grierson of LA Weekly wrote a negative review of the film.
