= Carpoolers =

- Genre: Sitcom
- Created by: Bruce McCulloch
- Starring: Fred Goss; Faith Ford; Jerry Minor; Tim Peper; Allison Munn; T. J. Miller; Jerry O'Connell
- Composers: David Schwartz; Gabriel Mann
- Country of origin: United States
- Original language: English
- No. of seasons: 1
- No. of episodes: 13

Production
- Executive producers: Justin Falvey; Darryl Frank; David Miner; Bruce McCulloch; Marsh McCall; Joe Russo; Anthony Russo
- Producer: Dan Kaplow
- Camera setup: Single-camera
- Running time: 30 minutes
- Production companies: T.R.O.N.T.; 3 Arts Entertainment; DreamWorks Television ABC Studios

Original release
- Network: ABC
- Release: October 2, 2007 – March 4, 2008

Carpoolers is an American television sitcom that aired on ABC from October 2, 2007, to March 4, 2008. The show was created by Bruce McCulloch, who also executive produced alongside Justin Falvey, Darryl Frank, David Miner, Marsh McCall, Joe Russo and Anthony Russo (formerly of Arrested Development). Joe and Anthony Russo also directed the pilot. The series focuses on the everyday lives of four male suburbanites with different occupations, who take their private lives and issues along for the ride during their daily commute to and from work.

Produced by DreamWorks Television, ABC Studios, and 3 Arts Entertainment, the series was given a thirteen-episode order on May 11, 2007. It originally aired Tuesdays at 8:30PM Eastern/7:30PM Central following Cavemen. After a brief hiatus, the show returned to ABC's schedule on January 8, 2008, at 9:30PM Eastern/8:30PM Central, following According to Jim.

After the writers strike ended, ABC declined to order any additional episodes of Carpoolers. It has aired in Australia on the Seven Network in the timeslot of 11:30pm Tuesdays, first after Eli Stone, then after Lipstick Jungle.

== Creator ==
Before the show aired, Bruce McCulloch published a diary breaking down the inspiration for Carpoolers and the process of creating the show. In the diary, Bruce vents about his frustrations in the industry concerning being constantly hired to produce scripts that would never make it to air. Bruce also talks about the inspiration of Carpoolers and how driving with his friends made him reflect on why male communion is portrayed on television and how it is cast in a negative light.

== Plot ==
Carpoolers is the story of four very different men. Gracen, the lead character of the show, is an uptight mediator with a wife and son. His carpooling companions are Aubrey, a stressed family man; Laird, an egotistical dentist who has lost everything in a divorce; and Dougie, a young member of the carpool whose marriage is often mocked by the others. They all work at the same building complex. Apart from Gracen and Laird, who are best friends, they usually have no contact outside of the carpool. However, in "The Recital", the four realize they are all friends, and become closer. Each episode begins with a cold open of the four carpoolers in a car, usually singing along with a past hit song with the exception of episode 6, in which Aubrey sings along enthusiastically with a commercial for women's pantyliners much to the disgust of everyone else. Following the cold open is a short Carpoolers theme song.

== Theme song ==
Unlike other shows, the Carpoolers theme song did not have a “full version”. The song is only 10 seconds long and was written and performed by Matt Pelham, the lead singer of the band The Features.

== Pilot ==
In the pilot episode of Carpoolers “Dougie’s First day or The Toaster” we are introduced to Aubrey (Jerry Minor), Gracen (Fred Goss), Laird (Jerry O’Connell), and Dougie (Tim Peper), who is joining the carpool for the first day, as they commiserate about life and sing old songs on their way to work. Gracen is discouraged to learn that his wife spent $200 on a new toaster when the old one worked fine. This feeling is amplified when Gracen learns that his wife and son both make more money than he does, causing Gracen and his wife to start having some marital issues. This all comes to a climax when the gang break into Gracen's house to steal the new toaster in an effort to save their friend's marriage.

== Recurring jokes and themes ==
=== Male friendship ===
Carpoolers episodes usually revolve around the 4 male members of the carpool talking with each other about their lives and families and of course singing. The show creator was open about this show and wanted to show male friendship and relationships in a more positive light.

=== Marriage and relationships ===
Carpoolers explore several different kinds of traditional relationships with each of the main characters having a different kind of relationship in their life.

Dougie is recently married with no kids to the classic Newlyweds couple, Laird is a divorced bachelor who is known for sleeping around, Gracen who is long termed married with one son and Aubrey married with 7 children who are often used as a comedic plot point. These 4 different kinds of relationships are used to contrast and compare each other's lives mostly in a comedic way

=== Other Carpools ===
==== The “Cool Carpool” which consists of 4 rich guys ====
Multiple appearances in episode 1 and episode 4 most notably for running over Dougie twice in the pilot episode while trying to reserve a parking space.

==== The “Geezer/old Guy Carpool” which consists of 4 old Men ====
Multiple appearances in episode 1 and episode 4 most notably for beating up the gang with a taser and golf clubs for yelling at them in the parking lot.

==== “Rust bucket Carpool” which consists of 4 men dressed in a “hillbilly” stereotype ====
Appearances in episode 4

==== Possible female Carpool ====
Multiple appearances in episode 4, The gang walk past a group of 4 attractive females walking past the gang.

== Music ==
The show was known for the notable musical choices the show would use for both the intro and outro of the show which the gang would often sing along to.

- All Out of Love & More Than a Feeling (Episode 1)
- Come On Eileen (Episode 2)
- Thunderstruck & Private Eyes (Episode 4)
- Lady 1973 & Love Grows (Episode 5)
- In the Air Tonight (Episode 7)
- Little Miss Can't Be Wrong (Episode 8)
- Back in Black (Episode 10)

== Cast and characters ==
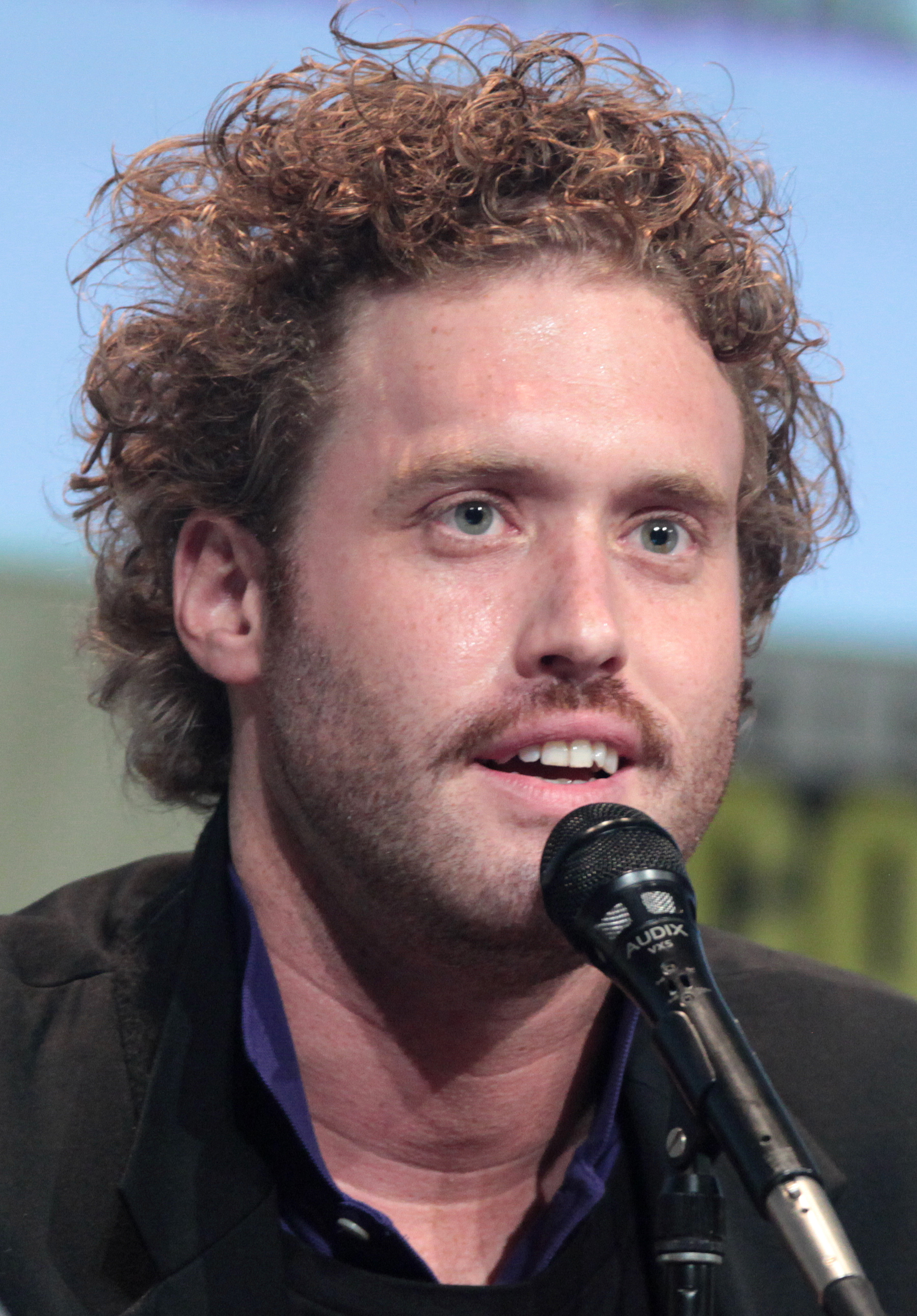
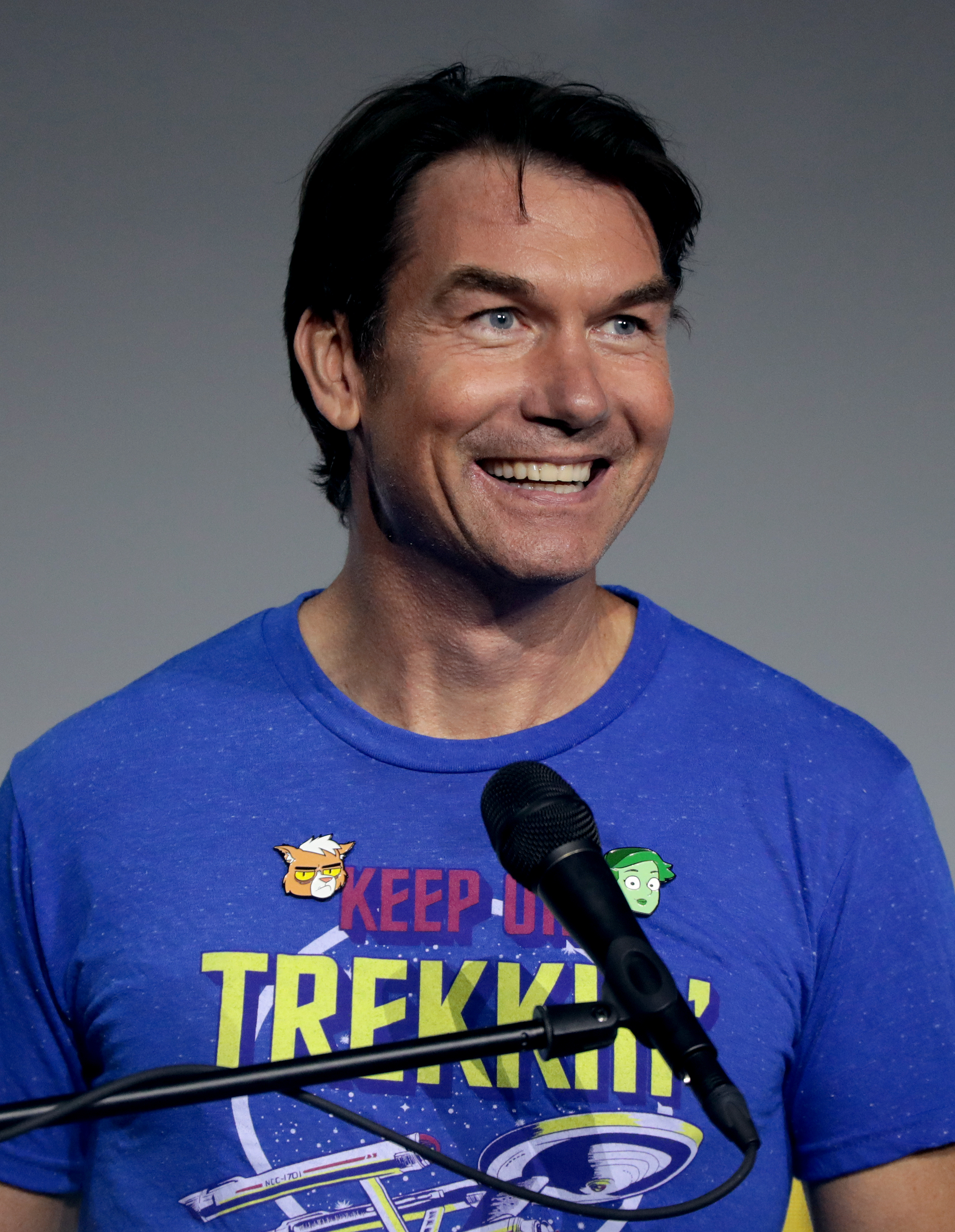

- Fred Goss as Gracen Brooker, a mediator with a wife and son. He and Laird Holcomb are friends as well as neighbors.
- Faith Ford as Leila Brooker, Gracen's sensible wife and successful real estate "flipper".
- Jerry Minor as Aubrey Williber, an accountant who looks after his rambunctious seven kids in addition to working while his lazy wife, who is never seen, but only depicted as a pair of feet, sits in her recliner. His signature catch phrase is "Gentlemen ... let's carpool", usually uttered immediately prior to beginning their journey to work.
- Tim Peper as Dougie: As the new carpooler, he tries to gain acceptance into the group of men while frequently committing major carpooling faux pas. He is a newlywed who likes to tell the others about the joy of marriage and love.
- Allison Munn as Cindy, Dougie's young, dewy wife; they have a saccharine sweet relationship. When she sends Dougie off to work with his lunch she tells him that she "is in every bite".
- T. J. Miller as Marmaduke Brooker, the emotionally stunted, hyper-articulate, hulking adult son of the Brookers who usually spends his entire day at home in his briefs (and towers over his parents by over a foot).
- Jerry O'Connell as Laird Holcomb, a recently divorced dentist whose ex-wife has taken almost everything he owned (except his absercisor and otherwise empty house); he sleeps with as many women as he can.

== Episodes ==
No.	Title	Directed by	Written by	Original release date	Prod. code
1	"Dougie's First Day"	Anthony Russo & Joe Russo	Bruce McCulloch	October 2, 2007	101
We are introduced to Aubrey, Gracen, Laird, and Dougie, who is joining the carpool for the first day, as they commiserate about life and sing old songs on their way to work. Gracen is discouraged to learn that his wife and son make more money than he does.
2	"Laird of the Rings"	Joe Russo	Bruce McCulloch	October 9, 2007	102
Laird borrows Gracen's wedding ring because he thinks it will make him more desirable to a woman. Marmaduke thinks that Laird may be his real father and Aubrey is seen sneaking into a motel by Dougie, who thinks the worst of it.
3	"Who Would You Do?"	Joe Russo	Emily Cutler	October 16, 2007	103
Laird is the topic of the night when Gracen asks Leila who she fantasizes about, in an attempt to spice things up in the bedroom. Gracen doesn't like the answer and it causes problems in the carpool.
4	"Down for the Count"	Joe Russo	Warren Lieberstein & Halsted Sullivan	October 23, 2007	107
Laird is frustrated to learn that not only does he have a low sperm count, but that Gracen has a much higher count. Dougie has to perform some manual labor in order to gain Aubrey's help getting a hot spot at a top notch pre-school.
5	"A Divorce to Remember"	Joe Russo	Gary Murphy	November 6, 2007	106
Laird hooks up with his hot but crazy ex-wife, Joannifer, who disrupts all of the carpoolers' lives. Meanwhile, Dougie and Cindy decide to renew their wedding vows to wipe out the memory of their catastrophic first wedding ceremony.
6	"The Code"	Anthony Russo	Marsh McCall	November 13, 2007	105
The men think they accidentally set the car of a rival carpoolers group on fire as a result of a prank, but swear to keep it between themselves. Marmaduke's automatic teller machine (ATM) with an $8 service charge is vandalized.
7	"The Seminar"	Joe Russo	Steve Leff	January 8, 2008	111
Laird is infatuated with the sexual harassment seminar leader, Dorrit. To guarantee time alone with her, he claims he's being sexually harassed by the women in his office. Meanwhile Leila enlists Marmaduke's sign spinning skills to promote her real estate business, but he has to out-spin the competitors on the same street corner.
8	"First Fight"	Jason Winer	Warren Lieberstein & Halsted Sullivan	January 22, 2008	109
Dougie wins tickets to see his favorite rock band, the Spin Doctors, but Cindy refuses to go because she doesn't trust anyone to babysit their infant; Leila distributes flyers door-to-door in an effort to boost her real estate career, but a typo identifies her as a hooker; and Laird adopts a neighborhood dog who turns out to be a wild, dog-eating coyote.
9	"The Handsomest Man"	Joe Russo	Teleplay by : Marsh McCall; Story by : Emily Cutler	January 29, 2008	108
Hot but vacuous Laird fears he may be losing his looks when he meets someone who's been dubbed the handsomest man' in his office building, so to make himself more interesting to women, Laird starts to take clarinet lessons. In the meantime, while guarding one of Leila's properties, Marmaduke falls for the girl who tagged Leila's flip.
10	"Wheel of Fortune"	Anthony Russo	Marsh McCall & Bruce McCulloch	February 12, 2008	110
When there are no parking spots available at the carpool lot, Laird decides to take a handicapped spot and forces Gracen to pretend he can't walk to his office. When a parking attendant discovers the hoax, the guys not only lose their carpool privileges, the bad karma keeps on coming.
11	"The Recital"	Anthony Russo	Kit Boss	February 19, 2008	104
Can the carpool group be friends outside of the car? That is the question Aubrey ponders when he invited the group to his daughter's piano recital. Marmaduke helps Gracen train for the annual charity run and for the chance to finally beat Leila.
12	"Lost in America"	Joe Russo	Teleplay by : Warren Lieberstein & Halsted Sullivan; Story by : Norm Hiscock	February 26, 2008	112
When Gracen refuses to support Marmaduke's newest business venture, a lawn-cutting business using a flock of sheep, Marmaduke moves in with Laird, who enjoys being a "dad" to Marmaduke, but this "father/son" bond causes a rift between him and Gracen.
13	"Take Your Daughter to Work Day"	Jason Winer	Steve Leff	March 4, 2008	113
Aubrey brings his daughter, Michelle, to work for "Take Your Daughter to Work Day," but gets fired when he's caught pretending to be his boss, and Cindy is possessed with power making big bucks selling Green Queen products.

== Nielsen ratings ==
=== Weekly ratings ===
Episode #	Title	Air Date	Rating	Share	18–49	Viewers	Rank
1	"Dougie's First Day"	October 2, 2007	5.9	9	3.4/9	9.02	#37
2	"Laird of the Rings"	October 9, 2007	4.9	8	2.8/8	7.36	#53
3	"Who Would You Do?"	October 16, 2007	4.6	7	2.7/7	6.96	#62
4	"Down for the Count"	October 23, 2007	4.8	7	2.4/6	7.13	#65
5	"A Divorce to Remember"	November 6, 2007	3.7	6	1.9/5	5.51	#78
6	"The Code"	November 13, 2007	3.6	6	1.9/5	5.22	#79
7	"The Seminar"	January 8, 2008	2.5	4	1.1/3	3.54	#78
8	"First Fight"	January 22, 2008	3.2	5	1.7/4	4.89	TBA
9	"The Handsomest Man"	January 29, 2008	2.6	4	1.3/3	3.84	#68
10	"Wheel of Fortune"	February 12, 2008	2.6	4	1.3/3	3.85	#76
11	"The Recital"	February 19, 2008	2.6	4	1.4/3	3.95	N/A
12	"Lost in America"	February 26, 2008	2.3	4	1.2/3	3.46	N/A
13	"Take Your Daughter to Work Day"	March 4, 2008	2.7	4	1.5/4	3.99	#79

=== Seasonal ratings ===
Seasonal ratings based on average total viewers per episode of Carpoolers on ABC:

Season	Timeslot (EDT)	Season Premiere	Season Finale	TV Season	Rank	Viewers (in millions)
1	Tuesday 8:30 P.M. (October 2, 2007 – November 13, 2007) Tuesday 9:30 P.M. (January 8, 2008 – March 4, 2008)	October 2, 2007	March 4, 2008	2007–2008	#134	5.3

+ Information is current as of March 7, 2008.

== Reception ==
IGN wrote: "Overall though, Carpoolers is a comedy that's lacking in many laughs" and "Watching the show you feel a bit bad for the cast".

- Rotten Tomatoes 23%
- TvGuide
- Metacritic of 37%
