= Wesley Jonathan =

American actor

- Occupation: Actor
- Years active: 1990–present
- Spouse: Tamara Mitchell (m. 2016)
- Children: 1

Wesley Jonathan is an American actor best known for his starring role as Jamal Grant in the NBC sitcom City Guys (1997–2001), Gary Thorpe in the sitcom What I Like About You (2002–2006), Sweetness in the film Roll Bounce (2005), Noah Cruise in the film Crossover (2006), and Fletcher "Stamps" Ballentine on TV Land's The Soul Man (2012–2016).

== Career ==
Jonathan started his early career acting in the early 1990s and has had two main roles in two series; City Guys as Jamal Grant, and What I Like About You opposite Amanda Bynes and Jennie Garth as Holly's best friend, Gary Thorpe. Jonathan landed his first job in a music video for Melissa Manchester. He then started working on 21 Jump Street.

Jonathan has starred, co-starred, or made guest appearances in several movies and television shows including: Sister, Sister, Moesha, Boy Meets World, Smart Guy, Thea, Baywatch, A Different World, Boston Public, Crossover, National Lampoon's Bag Boy, Divine Intervention, Roll Bounce, and the 1995 film Panther as Bobby Hutton.

== Personal life ==
Jonathan is married to Tamara Mitchell. They have a daughter, Faye. He was raised as a Jehovah's Witness.

== Filmography ==
=== Film ===
Year	Title	Role	Notes
1995	Panther	Little Bobby Hutton	
2002	Storm Watch	Ravi	
2002	Scream at the Sound of the Beep	Arsenio	
2003	The United States of Leland	Bengel	
2003	Baadasssss!	Panther	
2005	Roll Bounce	Sweetness	
2006	Crossover	Noah Cruise	
2007	Remember the Daze	Biz	
2007	National Lampoon's Bag Boy	Alonzo Ford	
2007	Divine Intervention	Reverend Robert Gibbs	
2008	Cuttin' Da Mustard	Tyree	
2009	B-Girl	Carlos	
2009	Steppin: The Movie	Terence	
2010	Speed-Dating	Too Cool	
2011	Budz House	Bud	
2011	Lone	Darian Gaynor	Short
2012	Dysfunctional Friends	Brett	
2012	What Goes Around Comes Around	Tyree	Video
2012	Basketball Wives the Movie (trailer) Spoof	Detective	Short
2013	Love Will Keep Us Together	Lee	TV movie
2013	Make Your Move 3D	Nick	
2014	4Play	Todd	
2015	Whitney	Babyface	TV movie
2016	Bad Dad Rehab	Shawn	TV movie
2018	A Boy. A Girl. A Dream.	Himself	
2019	I Left My Girlfriend for Regina Jones	John Mr. MVP	
2020	Trigger	Collin Mass	
2021	The Men in My Life	Sean Helms	
2022	The Stepmother 2	Chris Harris	
2023	Best Friend	Derrick	

=== Television ===
Year	Title	Role	Notes
1990	21 Jump Street	Kelly	Episode: "Hi Mom"
1990	Get a Life	Eddie	Recurring cast: season 1
1991	Baywatch	Jordan	Episode: "Nightmare Bay: Part 1 & 2"
1992	A Different World	South Central Looter #3	Episode: "Honeymoon in L.A.: Part 2"
1993	Crime & Punishment	DeRon	Episode: "Right to Bear Arms"
1993–94	Thea	Riddick	Recurring cast
1994	Sister, Sister	Charles/Michael	Episode: "First Dates" & "A Tall Tale"
1995	Misery Loves Company	Conner	Main cast
1995	Boy Meets World	T.J.	Episode: "Train Of Fools"
1996	Moesha	Norman	Episode: "Million Boy March"
1996	Minor Adjustments	Henry Harrison	Recurring cast
1996	Promised Land	Brandon	Episode: "The Expatriate"
1996	NewsRadio	Kid #1	Episode: "Arcade"
1996	Sister, Sister	Pico	Episode: "Double Exposure"
1997	The Practice	David Piper	Episode: "Part VI"
1997	Smart Guy	Tyler	Episode: "Lab Rats"
1997–2001	City Guys	Jamal Grant	Main cast
1998	The Parent Hood	Shake	Episode: "Color Him Father"
1998	NYPD Blue	Orlando Patterson	Episode: "The One That Got Away"
1998	USA High	Anthony	Episode: "Winnie's Brother"
2001	Boston Public	Tyronn Anderson	Episode: "Chapter Twelve" & "Chapter Fifteen"
2001	Judging Amy	-	Episode: "Darkness for Light"
2001	Felicity	Max	Episode: "Boooz"
2002–06	What I Like About You	Gary Thorpe	Main cast
2003	Greetings from Tucson	Saul	Episode: "Maria's Boyfriend" & "The First Time"
2008	CSI: Miami	Ross Nelson	Episode: "Won't Get Fueled Again"
2008	NCIS	Greg	Episode: "Silent Night"
2009	Cold Case	Billy Jeremiah Sanders	Episode: "Soul"
2010	Love That Girl!	Guy	Episode: "My Guy Friend"
2011	90210	Vaughn Floyd	Episode: "Revenge with the Nerd"
2011	The Celibate Nympho Chronicles	Darnel	Episode: "100 Days with No D"
2011	Reed Between the Lines	Michael	Episode: "Let's Talk About Daddy's Little Girl"
2011–14	The LeBrons	Kid (voice)	Main cast
2012	Prime Suspect	Dwayne	Episode: "Ain't No Sunshine"
2012–16	The Soul Man	"Stamps" Ballentine	Main cast
2013–14	Almost Home	Carlos	Main cast: season 1, recurring cast: season 2
2017	The New Edition Story	Michael Jonzun	Episode: "Part 1"
2017	Family Time	Thomas	Episode: "Reunited and It Feels So Good" & "Cold Feet"
2018	The Rookie	Prius Owner	Episode: "Crash Course"
2018–21	Monogamy	Carson	Main cast
2021	Partners in Rhyme	Boston	Recurring cast
