= Tim Peper =

American actor

Timothy W. Peper (born October 4, 1980, in Nyack, New York) is an American film, television and stage actor.

== Career ==
Peper is a graduate of New York University’s Tisch School of the Arts. He has performed in numerous theatrical productions such as Joseph and the Amazing Technicolor Dreamcoat, Othello, Lobby Hero, Waiting for Godot, and Fool for Love.

His television credits include a recurring role on Conviction. He has guest-starred on Law & Order, The Good Wife and As the World Turns. Prior to his casting on Carpoolers, he had a recurring role in Guiding Light playing Jimmy Donovan. He appeared in such feature films as The Greatest Game Ever Played and A Beautiful Life.

=== Selected filmography ===
- NCIS as NSA Special Agent Chad Flynderling (2013) (1 episode: "Gut Check")
- Croton Falls as Will Kent (2011)
- Canned as Sam (2009)
- Carpoolers as Dougie (2007)
- Guiding Light as Jimmy Donovan (2007)
- Law & Order as Chris Drake (2006)
- Conviction as Luke Tayler (2006)
- The Greatest Game Ever Played (credited as Timothy W. Peper) as Walter Gibbs (2005)
- Complications (2015)
