= Wil Calhoun =

American television producer and writer

- Born: Baton Rouge, Louisiana
- Occupation(s): Television producer and writer
- Years active: 1990–present

Wil Calhoun is an American television producer and writer.

Calhoun is best known for his work on the sitcom Friends, for which he was nominated for a Primetime Emmy in 1999. In 2002, along with Dan Schneider, he created the series What I Like About You, starring Amanda Bynes and Jennie Garth. His other television credits include Jesse, Sons & Daughters, Caroline in the City, Kath & Kim and Gary Unmarried.

In 1990, he guest starred twice on the action series MacGyver, before pursuing a career behind the camera.
