= Allison Munn =

American actress

- Born: Columbia, South Carolina, U.S.
- Education: College of Charleston
- Occupation: Actress
- Years active: 1999–present
- Spouse: Scott Holroyd (m. 2007)
- Children: 2

Allison Munn is an American actress. She played Caroline Dupree in the Fox sitcom That '70s Show, Tina Haven in The WB sitcom What I Like About You, Lauren in The WB/CW drama One Tree Hill, and Anne Harper on the Nickelodeon series Nicky, Ricky, Dicky & Dawn.

== Early life ==
Munn was born and raised in Columbia, South Carolina. Her father was Russell Munn, a political lobbyist. Munn graduated from AC Flora High School and The College of Charleston. She moved to New York, where she won a role in the Off-Broadway classic The Fantasticks.

== Career ==
Munn followed her stage roles with small roles in White Oleander, the film adaptation of the Janet Fitch novel of the same name, opposite Alison Lohman, Michelle Pfeiffer, Robin Wright-Penn and Renée Zellweger, and in Cameron Crowe's romantic tragicomedy Elizabethtown opposite Orlando Bloom and Kirsten Dunst.

In September 2003, Munn won a co-starring role opposite Amanda Bynes and Jennie Garth in the second season of The WB sitcom What I Like About You as Tina Haven, Holly Tyler's new best friend. Although their characters were the same age, Munn is eleven-and-a-half years older than her co-star Bynes. Munn remained on the show until the show ended with the fourth season on April 24, 2006. Munn also had a recurring role as Caroline, Fez's borderline stalker girlfriend on the Fox sitcom That '70s Show.

Munn co-starred as Cindy in the short-lived ABC sitcom Carpoolers that ran from October 2, 2007, to March 4, 2008. In 2009, Munn began a recurring role on The WB drama One Tree Hill playing Lauren, Jamie Scott's teacher who begins to date Skills Taylor at the end of the sixth season.

From 2014 to 2018, Munn co-starred opposite Brian Stepanek as Anne Harper, the mother of the titular quadruplets in Nickelodeon sitcom Nicky, Ricky, Dicky & Dawn.

== Personal life ==
Munn began dating her childhood friend, actor Scott Holroyd, in 2004. They became engaged in Paris in December 2006 and married on November 17, 2007, at the French Huguenot Church in Charleston, South Carolina. They reside in Los Angeles with their pet terrier, Buster Keaton. In November 2011, Munn announced the birth of their son via her Twitter. She gave birth to their daughter in 2015.

In 2017, Munn joined her former One Tree Hill castmates in signing a letter of support for one of the show's writers, who had accused One Tree Hill's showrunner of sexual harassment.

=== Political activism ===
Munn lends her name and support to the non-profit political organization Rock the Vote, where she is actively involved in encouraging young people to register to vote.

== Filmography ==
=== Film ===
Year	Title	Role	Notes
2002	Local Boys	Allison	
2002	White Oleander	Hannah	
2005	Elizabethtown	Desk Clerk Charlotte	
2005	A Couple of Days and Nights	Tequila	
2007	Farm Girl in New York	Mary	

=== Television ===
Year	Title	Role	Notes
1999–2000	Now and Again	Gretchen	2 episodes
2000	Law & Order: Special Victims Unit	Emily Harlin	Episode: "Russian Love Poem"
2001–2006	That '70s Show	Caroline	Recurring role, 9 episodes
2001	2gether	Cindy	2 episodes
2002	St. Sass	Kimmy	Television film
2002	Inside Schwartz	Jackie	Episode: "Kissing Cousin"
2002	JAG	Sue Ellen Newton	Episode: "Odd Man Out"
2002	Boston Public	Janice Scott	Episode: "Chapter 38"
2003	Sweet Potato Queens	N/A	TV film
2003	Charmed	Wendy	Episode: "Sand Francisco Dreamin'"
2003–2006	What I Like About You	Tina Haven	Main role (seasons 2–4)
2007–2008	Carpoolers	Cindy	Main role, 13 episodes
2008	Overkill	Carrie	Unsold TV pilot
2009	Untitled Family Plot	Jillian	Unsold TV pilot
2009–2012	One Tree Hill	Lauren	Recurring role, 20 episodes
2010	Wright vs. Wrong	Tami Manly	TV film
2013	Family Tools	Clarissa	Episode: "Waiting for Mrs. Bichette"
2013	Dads	Anne	Episode: "Funny Girl"
2014–2018	Nicky, Ricky, Dicky & Dawn	Anne Harper	Main role
2015	Instant Mom	Donna Dreyfus	Episode: "Teacher's Pest"
2015	It's Always Sunny in Philadelphia	Kelly	Episode: "The Gang Misses the Boat"
2020	The Big Show Show	Cassy Wight	Main role
2020–present	Family Guy	Various voice roles	Recurring role
