= What I Like About You (TV series) =

American television sitcom (2002–2006)

- Genre: Teen sitcom
- Created by: Wil Calhoun; Dan Schneider
- Showrunners: Wil Calhoun (seasons 1 & 2); Caryn Lucas (seasons 3 & 4)
- Starring: Amanda Bynes; Jennie Garth; Simon Rex; Wesley Jonathan; Leslie Grossman; Michael McMillian; Nick Zano; Allison Munn; Stephen Dunham
- Theme music composer: Wally Palmar, Mike Skill and Jimmy Marinos (original song); Eric Ferguson, Joey Armstrong and Josh Auer (arrangement for Lillix cover); Philip Steir (remix; seasons 2–4)
- Opening theme: "What I Like About You" performed by Lillix
- Country of origin: United States
- Original language: English
- No. of seasons: 4
- No. of episodes: 86 (list of episodes)

Production
- Executive producers: Brian Robbins; Mike Tollin; Joe Davola (entire run); Wil Calhoun; Dan Schneider (both seasons 1–2); Caryn Lucas (seasons 3–4)
- Producers: Drew Brown; Shelley Zimmerman; Rich Kaplan
- Production location: California
- Camera setup: Multi-camera
- Running time: 20–22 minutes
- Production companies: Schneider's Bakery (uncredited); Tollin/Robbins Productions; Warner Bros. Television

Original release
- Network: The WB
- Release: September 20, 2002 – March 24, 2006

What I Like About You is an American television sitcom co-created by Wil Calhoun and Dan Schneider. It is set mainly in New York City, following the lives of two sisters: vivacious teenager Holly (Amanda Bynes) and her responsible older sister Val (Jennie Garth). The series ran for four seasons on The WB from September 20, 2002, to March 24, 2006, with a total of 86 episodes produced. With the exception of a brief period early in the second season, What I Like About You was a headline on The WB's Friday night comedy block.

== Cast and characters ==
Throughout their time on the series, two main characters—Vince and Lauren—are never given last names. Jeff is also never given a last name, although in the artwork for the season 1 DVDs, he is listed as "Jeff Campbell".

=== Main ===
Actor	Character	Seasons			
Actor	Character	1	2	3	4
Amanda Bynes	Holly Tyler	Main	Main	Main	Main
Jennie Garth	Val Tyler	Main	Main	Main	Main
Simon Rex	Jeff Campbell	Main			
Wesley Jonathan	Gary Thorpe	Main	Main	Main	Main
Leslie Grossman	Lauren	Recurring	Main	Main	Main
Michael McMillian	Henry Gibson	Recurring	Main	Guest	
Nick Zano	Vince		Main	Main	Main
Allison Munn	Tina Haven		Main	Main	Main
Stephen Dunham	Peter		Main		

=== Recurring ===
- Dan Cortese as Vic Meladeo (seasons 1 & 4)
- Edward Kerr as Rick (seasons 2–4)
- David de Lautour as Ben Sheffield (season 3)

=== Guest ===
- Abigail Breslin
- Fran Drescher
- Megan Fox
- JoAnna Garcia
- Rebecca Gayheart
- Tony Hawk
- Minka Kelly
- Cameron Mathison
- Jesse McCartney
- Jenny McCarthy
- Jason Priestley
- JC Chasez
- Luke Perry
- Ian Ziering
- Penn Badgley
- Jenna Fischer

== Theme song and opening sequences ==
The series takes its title from the 1980 song of the same name by American rock band The Romantics; it was written by the group's members Wally Palmar, Mike Skill, Rich Cole, and Jimmy Marinos. A cover version of the song, performed by the Canadian all-female rock group Lillix, can also be heard on the soundtrack of the 2003 remake of Freaky Friday and the soundtrack of the film 13 Going on 30. The theme was remixed into a techno/dance style theme for the second season by Philip Steir, who composed all the music for the remainder of the series.

The pilot episode has a short opening sequence, and the cast members' names are only shown over the cold open. The first season's opening sequence features intercut scenes (as from home movies) of two girls portraying younger versions of Holly and Val, with shots of Bynes and Garth sticking their tongues out at the camera, mixed with footage excerpted from the first four episodes. The opening title sequence for the rest of the series features the show's cast in front of digitally inserted scenes of New York at night. Different versions of the sequence are used for SD and HD broadcasts.

Due to music costs, and rights, DVD and streaming releases replace the theme song of Lillix's cover. Remarking upon it when the series was added to HBO Max in January 2021 with the replacement music, TVLine called it "royalty-free garbage that not even Shazam can identify."

== Broadcast ==
=== Episodes ===
==== Series overview ====
Season	Episodes	Originally released	
Season	Episodes	First released	Last released
1	22	September 20, 2002	May 9, 2003
2	22	September 11, 2003	May 7, 2004
3	24	September 17, 2004	May 20, 2005
4	18	September 16, 2005	March 24, 2006

==== History ====
What I Like About You premiered on Friday, September 20, 2002, in the 8:00pm timeslot. When the second season premiered on September 11, 2003, the series moved to Thursday nights at 9:00pm, alongside The Jamie Kennedy Experiment. On January 9, 2004, the series moved back to Friday nights, in the 8:30pm timeslot. With the third season premiere on September 17, 2004, the series moved back to its original 8:00pm timeslot and remained there until the series finale in March 2006.

=== International ===
In Canada, the series aired on YTV and later on Nickelodeon.

In Italy, the series aired under the name Le cose che amo di te (The things I Love about you) on Rai 2 from July 7, 2006 until August 2, 2008.

=== Streaming ===
From January 2021 to January 2023, all four seasons of What I Like About You, began streaming on HBO Max.

=== Syndication ===
From April to September 2006, reruns of What I Like About You aired as part of The WB’s Daytime WB weekday afternoon programming block alongside 8 Simple Rules. Reruns of the series moved to The CW (which replaced The WB) on September 18, 2006, airing for a full hour at 3:00PM on weekdays alongside Reba. On September 24, 2007, The CW reduced its daytime reruns of What I Like About You to one episode per day to accommodate the addition of reruns of All of Us, remaining until September 2008. Following the series' departure from The CW, the show began airing on ABC Family (now Freeform) in various timeslots during the daytime. The N aired the series in early 2009, a few months before their rebranding to TeenNick, where the series aired before subsequently being removed in 2013.

== Home media ==
On May 1, 2007, Warner Home Video released the complete first season on DVD in region 1. The three-disc set included a gag reel as its only bonus feature. Due to high music licensing issues, Lillix's cover of the theme song was removed and replaced with a generic pop-rock song produced specifically for the set. Due to low sales and high music licensing costs, no further seasons were given a general retail release.

On March 7, 2017, Warner Archive released the second season on DVD in region 1 in a three-disc set. The third season was released on November 27, 2018 in a three-disc set, and the fourth season was released on February 26, 2019 in a two-disc set. The releases for seasons two through four are Manufacture-on-Demand (MOD) releases, frequently pressed on DVD-R discs. Although the final three seasons were originally broadcast in widescreen high definition, the episodes are presented on DVD in fullscreen.

DVD name	Release date	Ep #	Additional information
The Complete First Season	May 1, 2007	22	Bonus features include a Gag Reel.
The Complete Second Season	March 7, 2017	22	None.
The Complete Third Season	November 27, 2018	24	None.
The Complete Fourth Season	February 26, 2019	18	None.

== Ratings ==
=== United States ratings ===
Season		U.S. ratings
1	2002-2003	2.96M
2	2003-2004	2.55M
3	2004-2005	2.5M
4	2005-2006	2.2M

== Awards and nominations ==
GLAAD Media Award

Year	Category	Recipient	Results
2006	Outstanding Individual Episode (In a Series Without a Regular Gay Character)	"Someone's In the Kitchen with Daddy"	Nominated

Teen Choice Awards

Year	Category	Recipient	Results
2003	Choice TV: Breakout Show	What I Like About You	Nominated
Choice TV Breakout Star	Wesley Jonathan		Nominated
Choice TV Actress: Comedy	Amanda Bynes		Nominated
2004	Choice TV Actress: Comedy	Amanda Bynes	Nominated
2005	Choice TV Show: Comedy	What I Like About You	Nominated
2005	Choice TV Actress: Comedy	Amanda Bynes	Nominated

Young Artist Awards

Year	Category	Recipient	Results
2003	Best Performance in a TV Comedy Series: Guest Starring Young Actress	Chelsea Brummet	Nominated
2004	Best Performance in a TV Series (Comedy or Drama): Leading Young Actress	Amanda Bynes	Nominated
